= Chambersburg, Pennsylvania =

Borough in Pennsylvania, US

- Borough
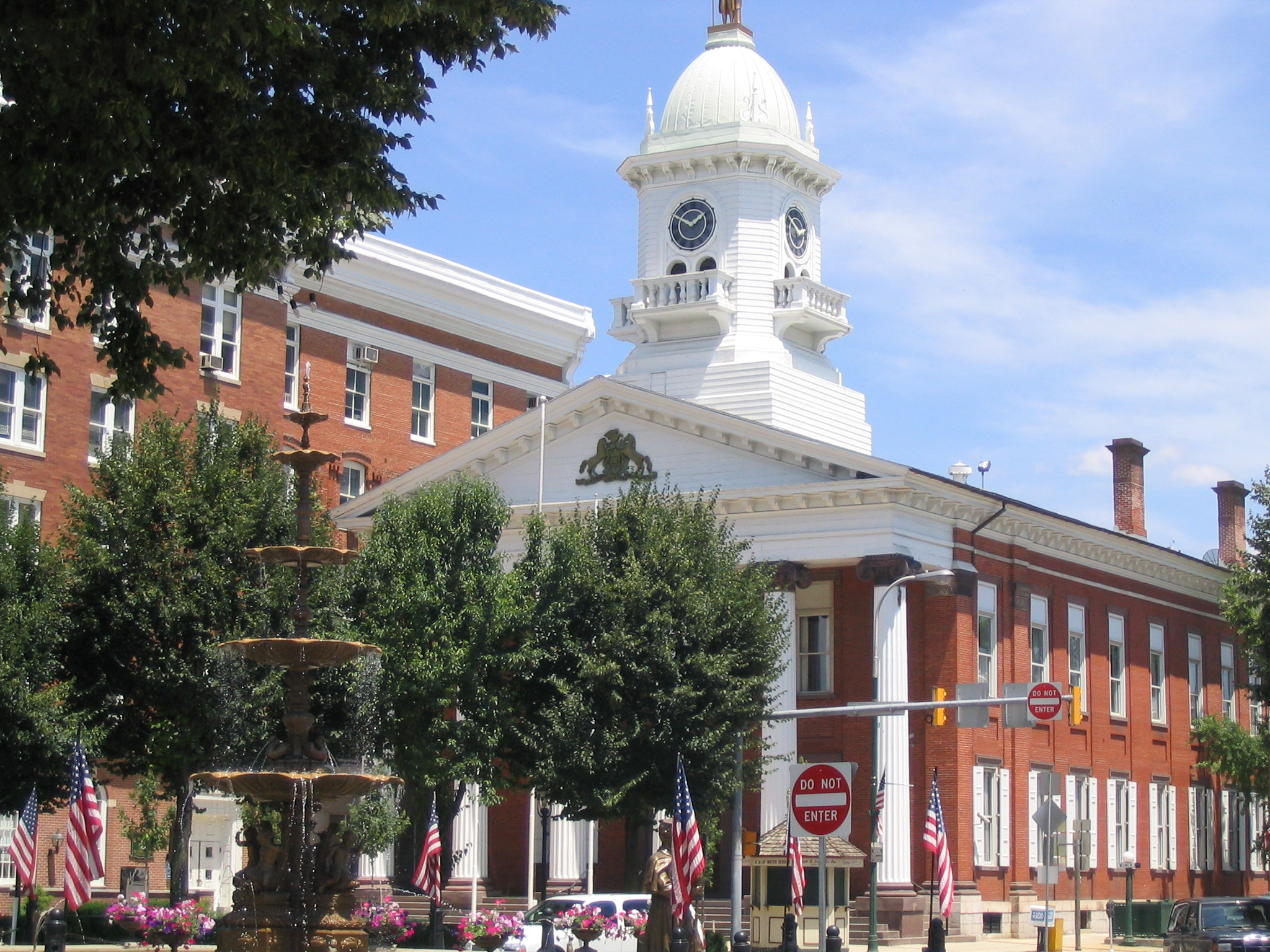
- Memorial Square in downtown Chambersburg

- Flag Seal

- Location within Franklin County and Pennsylvania
- Coordinates: 39°56′15″N 77°39′40″W
- Country: United States
- State: Pennsylvania
- County: Franklin
- Founded: 1734
- Incorporated: 1803
- Named for: Benjamin Chambers

Government
  - Mayor: Kenneth Hock

Area
  - Borough: 6.93 sq mi (17.94 km^{2})
  - Land: 6.93 sq mi (17.94 km^{2})
  - Water: 0 sq mi (0.00 km^{2})
- Elevation: 640 ft (200 m)

Population (2020)
  - Borough: 21,903
  - Density: 3,162/sq mi (1,221/km^{2})
  - Urban: 52,273
  - Metro: 149,618 (Micropolitan area)
- Time zone: UTC−5 (EST)
  - Summer (DST): UTC−4 (EDT)
- ZIP Code: 17201, 17202
- Area code: 717 and 223
- FIPS code: 42-12536
- GNIS ID: 1215243
- Website: www.chambersburgpa.gov

Chambersburg is a borough in and the county seat of Franklin County, in the South Central region of Pennsylvania, United States. It is in the Cumberland Valley, which is part of the Great Appalachian Valley, and 13 miles (21 km) north of Maryland and the Mason–Dixon line and 52 miles (84 km) southwest of Harrisburg, the state capital. According to the United States Census Bureau, Chambersburg's 2020 population was 21,903. When combined with the surrounding Greene, Hamilton, and Guilford Townships, the population of Greater Chambersburg is 66,340 people. The Chambersburg, PA Metropolitan Statistical Area includes surrounding Franklin County, and in 2010 included 149,618 people.

According to the Pennsylvania Department of Community and Economic Development, Chambersburg Borough is the thirteenth-largest municipality in Pennsylvania and the largest borough as measured by fiscal size as of 2016. Chambersburg Borough is organized under the Pennsylvania Borough Code and is not a home-rule municipality.

Chambersburg's settlement began in 1730, when water mills were built at Conococheague Creek and Falling Spring Creek. The town developed on both sides of these creeks. Its history includes episodes relating to the French and Indian War, the Whiskey Rebellion, John Brown's raid on Harpers Ferry, and the Civil War. The borough was the only major northern community burned down by Confederate forces during the war. Residents charged the Confederates with war crimes.

Chambersburg is served by the Lincoln Highway, U.S. 30, between McConnellsburg and Gettysburg. U.S. 11, the Molly Pitcher Highway, passes through it between Shippensburg, Pennsylvania, and Hagerstown, Maryland. Interstate 81 skirts the borough to its east. The town lies approximately midpoint on US Route 30 between Pittsburgh and Philadelphia. The local topography reflects both flatter areas like Philadelphia and mountainous areas like Pittsburgh. Downtown Chambersburg has occasional events such as Food Truck Festival, Apple Fest, and Icefest.

== History ==
=== European settlement ===
Native Americans living or hunting in the area during the 18th century included the six Iroquois tribes of a confederacy known as the Iroquois League or Haudenosaunee, the Lenape, and the Shawnee. The Lenape lived mostly to the east, with the Iroquois to the north, and the Shawnee to the south. Their traders, hunters, and warriors traveled on the north-south route sometimes called the "Virginia path" through the Cumberland Valley, from New York through what became Carlisle and Shippensburg, then through what would become Hagerstown, Maryland, crossing the Potomac River into the Shenandoah Valley.

1751 Fry-Jefferson map depicting 'The Great Waggon Road to Philadelphia'

Benjamin Chambers, a Scots-Irish immigrant, is credited with settling "Falling Spring" in 1730. He built a grist mill and saw mill by a then-26-foot-high (7.9 m) waterfall where Falling Spring Creek joined Conococheague Creek. The creek provided power for the mills, and soon a settlement grew and became known as "Falling Spring".

On March 30, 1734, Chambers received a "Blunston license" for 400 acres (160 ha), from a representative of the Penn family. European settlement in the area remained of questionable legality until the treaty ending the French and Indian War in 1763, because not all Indian tribes with land claims had signed treaties with the British colonial government.

The Penn family encouraged settlement in the area in order to strengthen its case in a border dispute with the Maryland Colony, which had resulted in hostilities known as Cresap's War. This dispute was not settled until 1767, with the border survey that resulted in the Mason–Dixon line. Chambers traveled to England to testify in support of Penn's claims. To maintain peace with the Indians, Penn sometimes arranged for European settlers to be removed from nearby areas. In May 1750, Benjamin Chambers helped remove settlers from the nearby Burnt Cabins, named after an incident.

The area was first classified as part of Chester County, then Lancaster County (as that was created from Chester County's western area). Then Lancaster County was split, with its western portion renamed as Cumberland County; finally another split (this time of Cumberland County) established Franklin County in 1784. (Adams County adjoins it on the east).

The Great Wagon Road connecting Philadelphia with the Shenandoah Valley (and an east-west branch through Hagerstown and Cumberland, Maryland to the Ohio Valley known as Nemacolin's Path) passed nearby. In 1744, the road was completed through Harris's Ferry, Carlisle, Shippensburg, and Chambersburg to the Potomac River. In 1748 a local militia was formed for protection against Indians, with Benjamin Chambers named as its colonel.

Chambersburg was still considered frontier during the French and Indian War. Benjamin Chambers built a private stone fort during the war, which was equipped with two 4-pounder cannons. Fighting and troop movements occurred nearby. The area's population dropped from about 3,000 in 1755 as the war began, to about 300 during the conflict. Most settlers did not return until after 1764 (when the peace treaty was signed between Great Britain and France).

Because Chambers's fort was otherwise lightly defended, officials attempted to remove the cannons to prevent them from being captured by Indians and used against other forts. However, the attempted removal failed. One of the cannons still remained in 1830, when it was fired to celebrate Independence Day that year.

The Forbes Road and other trails going to Fort Pitt passed nearby as well. The Forbes Road developed into part of the main road connecting Pittsburgh and Philadelphia, and much later into US 30. Chambersburg developed as a trading and transportation hub at the crossroads of Forbes Road and the Great Wagon Road.

Fighting continued in the area after the war. The Enoch Brown school massacre took place during Pontiac's War, when Native Americans were trying to expel European Americans from the area. The Black Boys rebelled against British troops stationed at Fort Loudon.

The town of Chambersburg was platted or laid out in 1764. Lots were advertised for sale on July 19 in The Pennsylvania Gazette, published by Benjamin Franklin.

Notice is hereby given to the Public, that there is a town is laid out on Conegogig Creek, on both sides of the Great Falling Spring, where is falls into said creek, by Benjamin Chambers, of Cumberland County. Lots may be had on reasonable terms and Firm Deeds granted for them by said Chambers: the day appointed for drawing of said lots is the 28th day of June inst.. which is a Thursday. The situation of this town is very good for water and stone, both free and marble, and sand all handy to the spot, and a well timbered part of the country adjoining it; within said town is a good Gristmill, Sawmill, and Grindstones going by water. The articles of the Town shall be read on the day appointed for the drawing of the Lots, and the terms of the sale published by me

— Benjamin Chambers

The first settlers were Scots-Irish Presbyterians; German Protestants came soon afterward. Relatively few Quakers and English Protestants (who made up a large proportion of early Pennsylvania settlers generally) settled as far west as Chambersburg. However, blacks lived in Chambersburg almost from the settlement's beginning. Benjamin Chambers owned a black female slave sometime before the French and Indian War and twenty slaves were recorded as taxable property in 1786.

The earliest church was established by Scots-Irish Presbyterians in 1734. Chambers gave the congregation land in 1768, for an annual rent of only a single rose. Later, the First Lutheran Church and Zion Reformed Church both organized in 1780 under similar terms, so these three churches came to be known as the "Rose Rent Churches". A Catholic community organized in 1785. St. James African Methodist Episcopal Church dates its founding to members purchasing a log cabin from the expanding Catholic congregation in 1811, and the congregation continued and expanded through 1830. The Mt. Moriah First African Baptist Church dates to 1887. The Jewish cemetery dates back to 1840.

=== 1775–1858 ===
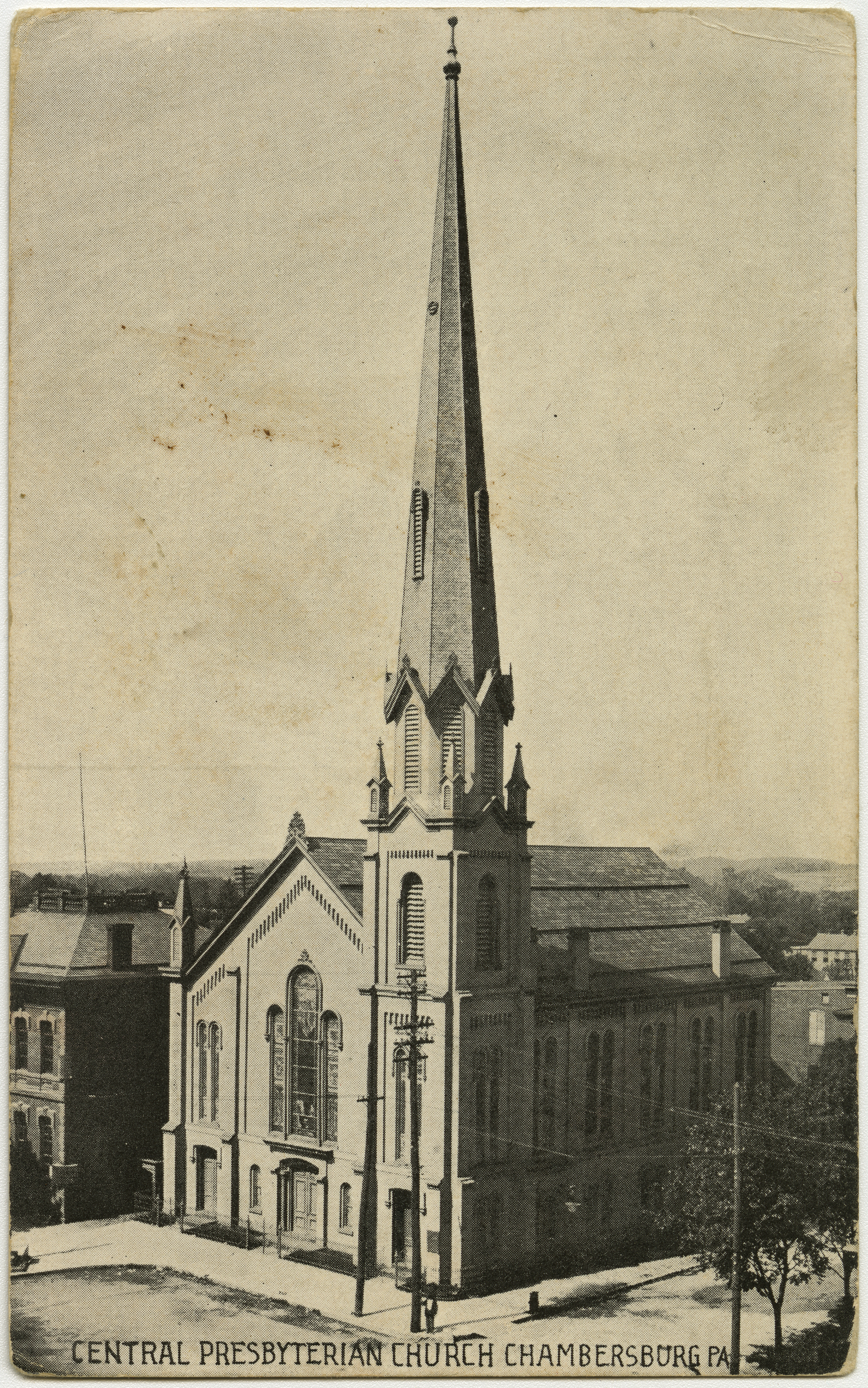
Central Presbyterian Church on the Diamond (town square) in an old postcard

In June 1775, soon after the Battle of Lexington, local troops were raised to fight the British in the American Revolution under the command of Benjamin Chambers's eldest son Captain James Chambers, as part of the 1st Pennsylvania Regiment. These troops were among the first non-New Englanders to join the siege of Boston, arriving on August 7, 1775. James Chambers fought for seven years during the revolution, reaching the rank of Colonel of Continental Army troops on September 26, 1776. His two brothers, William and Benjamin Jr., each served for much of the war and reached the rank of captain. James Chambers commanded local troops at the Battle of Long Island, and at White Plains, Trenton, Princeton, Brandywine, Germantown, and Monmouth. He was part of the rear guard covering the retreat from Brooklyn, and was wounded at the Battle of Brandywine while facing Hessian troops under General Knuphausen at Chadds Ford.

During the Whiskey Rebellion, local citizens raised a liberty pole in support of the rebels, and to protest conscription of soldiers to put down the rebellion. Nevertheless, these citizens were censured in a town meeting and removed the pole the next day. President George Washington, while leading United States troops against the rebels, came through town on the way from Carlisle to Bedford, staying overnight on October 12, 1794. According to tradition, Washington lodged with Dr. Robert Johnson, a surgeon in the Pennsylvania line during the Revolution. This march was one of only two times that a sitting president personally commanded the military in the field. (The other was after President James Madison fled the British occupation of Washington, D.C., during the War of 1812.) After sending the troops toward Pittsburgh from Bedford under General Henry "Light Horse Harry" Lee, Washington returned through Chambersburg sometime between October 21 and 26. Local tradition holds that Washington lodged at the Skinner Tavern in Horse Valley, some distance northwest of the town, for an evening; a letter to Alexander Hamilton written on October 26 references his forces "ascending the North Mountain from Skinners by a wrong road". James Chambers was appointed a Brigadier General of Militia during the Whiskey Rebellion.

Chambersburg was incorporated on March 21, 1803, and declared the County Seat when the State Assembly established a formal government. The first courthouse was John Jack's tavern on the Diamond (town square) in 1784, with a permanent courthouse built in 1793, and the first county jail built 1795. The "Old Jail" was built in 1818, survived the fire of 1864 and is the oldest jail building in Pennsylvania. It was originally used as the sheriff's residence and had the longest continuous use of any jail in the state, operating until 1971. Today the Old Jail is a museum and home to the Franklin County – Kittochtinny Historical Society. The county's gallows still stand in the jail's courtyard. From 1786 to 1879 there were five executions in Franklin County totaling six 6 felons – five for murder and one for rape.

Much of the town's growth was due to its position as a transportation center, first as the starting point on the Forbes Road to Pittsburgh. The U.S. Congress placed Chambersburg on the Philadelphia-Pittsburgh postal road in 1803. The road was rebuilt as the Chambersburg-Bedford Turnpike in 1811. The Cumberland Valley Railroad was built in 1837 and was the area's center of economic activity for nearly 100 years. Until the completion of the Pennsylvania Railroad's main line in 1854, the fastest route from Pittsburgh to Philadelphia was by stagecoach from Pittsburgh to Chambersburg, and then by train to Philadelphia.

=== Civil War era ===
==== Underground Railroad / John Brown ====
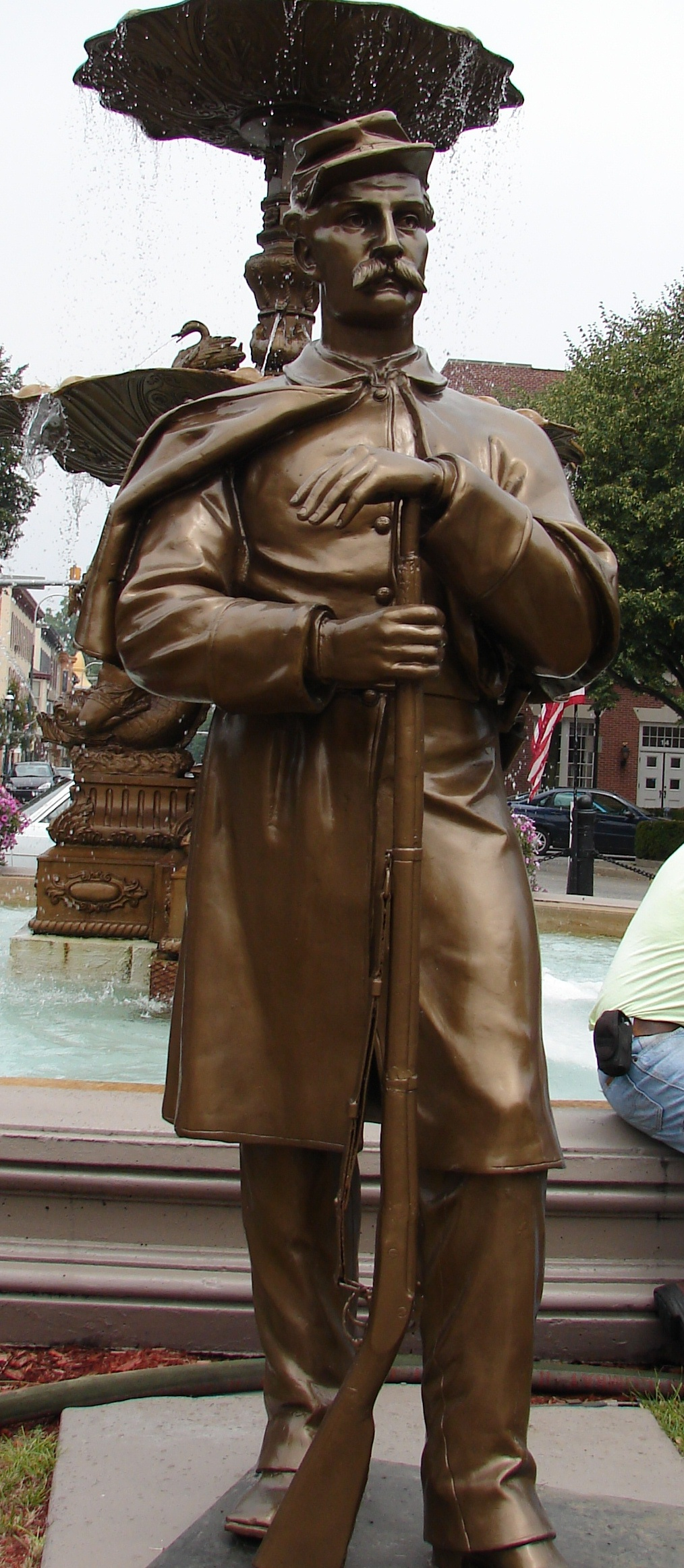
Statue of a Union soldier on the main square.

By 1859, Chambersburg's active community of free and enslaved blacks and sympathetic whites had attracted a stop on the Underground Railroad. Several schools taught black children, although such activity was illegal in Virginia and other slave states further south. John Brown stayed in an upstairs room at Mary Ritner's boarding house between June and October, 1859 while preparing for his raid on Harpers Ferry (then in Virginia). Several of his fellow raiders stayed in the house as well, and four of them escaped capture and briefly visited the house after the raid. The house still stands at 225 East King Street. While in Chambersburg, Brown posed as Dr. Isaac Smith, an iron mine developer, and bought, shipped, and stored weapons under the guise of mining equipment.

Brown (using the name John Smith) and John Henry Kagi met with Frederick Douglass and Shields Green at an abandoned quarry outside of town to discuss the raid on August 19. According to Douglass's account, Brown described the planned raid in detail and Douglass advised him against it. Douglass also provided $10 from a supporter, and had helped Green – a future raider – locate Brown.

==== First two Confederate occupations, selective burnings ====
During the American Civil War on October 10, 1862, Confederate Maj. Gen. J.E.B. Stuart, with 1,800 cavalrymen, raided Chambersburg, destroying $250,000 of railroad property and taking 500 guns, hundreds of horses, and enslaving "eight young colored men and boys". They failed, however, to accomplish one of the main targets of the raid: to burn the railroad bridge across the Conococheague Creek at Scotland, five miles (8 km) north of town.

During the early days of the 1863 Gettysburg campaign, a Virginia cavalry brigade under Brig. Gen. Albert G. Jenkins occupied the town and burned several warehouses and Cumberland Valley Railroad structures and the bridge at Scotland. From June 24–28, 1863, much of the Army of Northern Virginia passed through Chambersburg en route to Carlisle and Gettysburg, and General Robert E. Lee established his headquarters at a nearby farm.

Franklin County Courthouse following the 1864 McCausland raid.

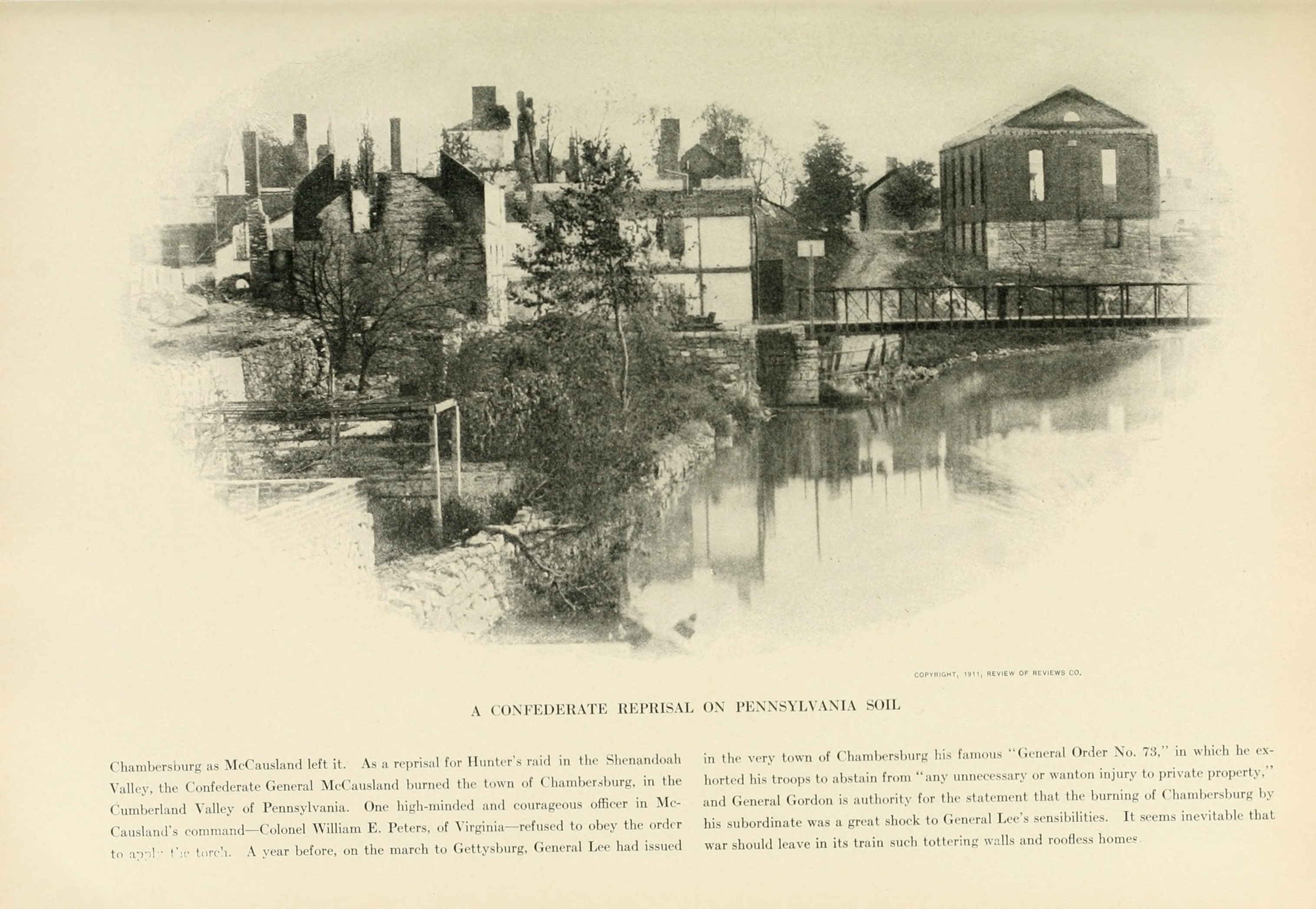
Chambersburg 1864

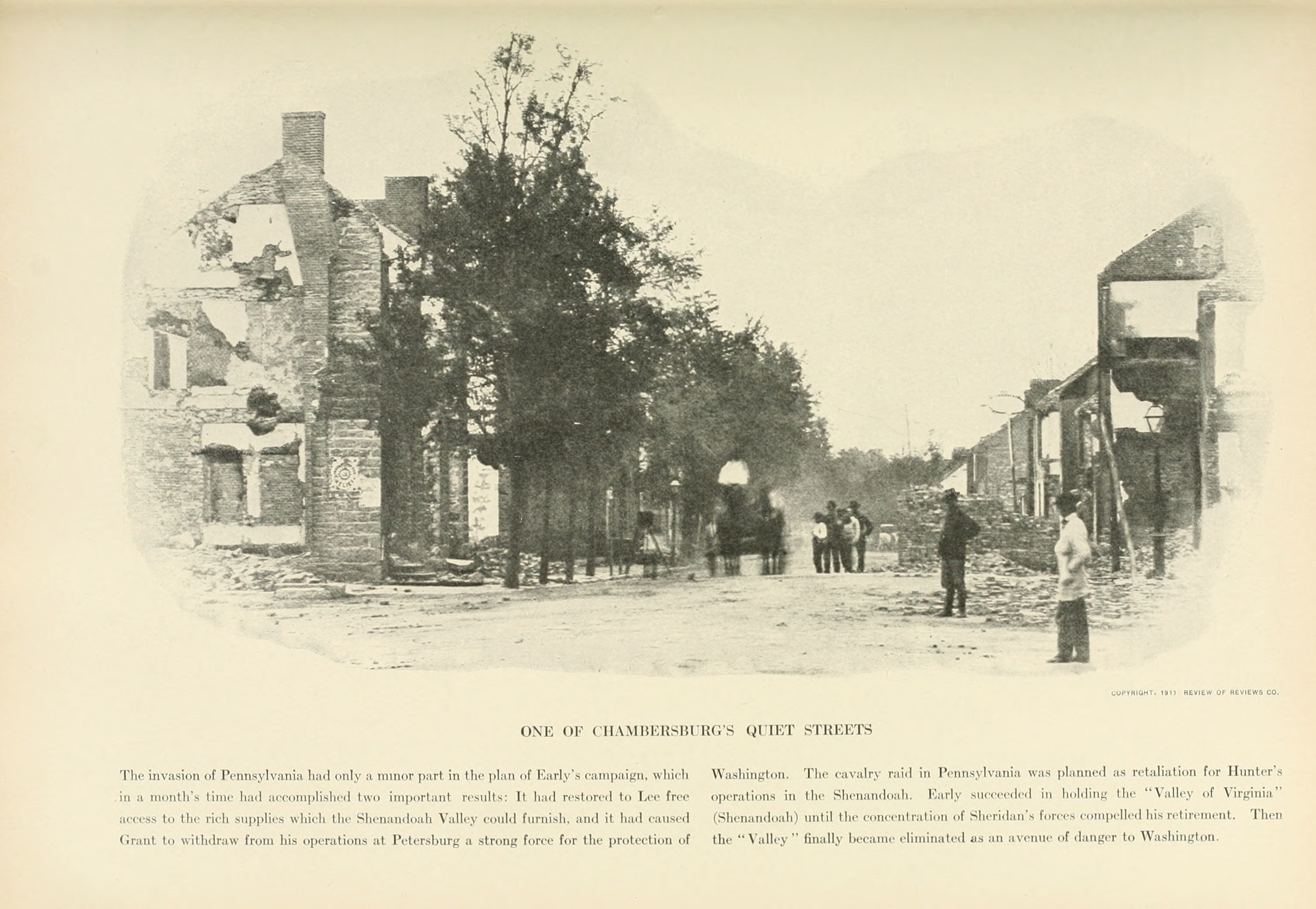
Chambersburg 1864

==== July 30, 1864 devastation ====
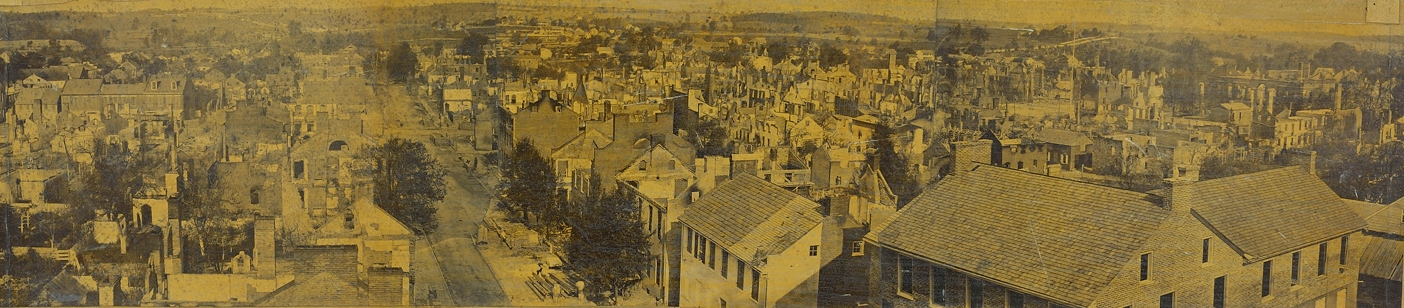
View of the ruins of Chambersburg, by Charles L. Lochman, 1864

The following year, Chambersburg was invaded for a third time, as cavalry, dispatched from the Shenandoah Valley by Jubal Early, arrived. On July 30, 1864, a large portion of the town was burned down by Confederate Brig. Gen. John McCausland for failing to provide a ransom of $500,000 in U.S. currency, or $100,000 in gold. The local bank had sent its reserves out of town for safekeeping. Among the few buildings left standing was the Masonic Temple, which had been guarded under orders by a Confederate member of the Masons. Norland, the home of Republican politician and editor Alexander McClure, was burned although it was well north of the main fire. Early had ordered the ransom as compensation for those residents of the Shenandoah Valley whose homes has been burned by Union Brig.-Gen. David Hunter. He also burned the Virginia Military Institute. According to McCausland report the only death occurred when one of his soldiers was killed in the vicinity of the town after his troops left and no citizens lost their lives. One black Chambersburg resident was burned to death when Confederates set his house on fire and then refused to allow him to leave, trapping him in the flames. Another man was asked by the Confederates if he had ever educated "niggers"; after replying that he had, the Confederates burned his house down. Subsequently, "Remember Chambersburg" became a Union battle cry. The property damage was $713,294.34 and personal property damage was $915,137,24 totaling $1,628,431.58, of which 50% was paid by state approbation, first by an act of legislature February 15, 1866, $500,000.00 and the second under the act of legislation May 27, 1871; under the last named act claimants (numbering 650) each had a certificate for amount of his loss but claims payable only when said claims were paid by the United States government.

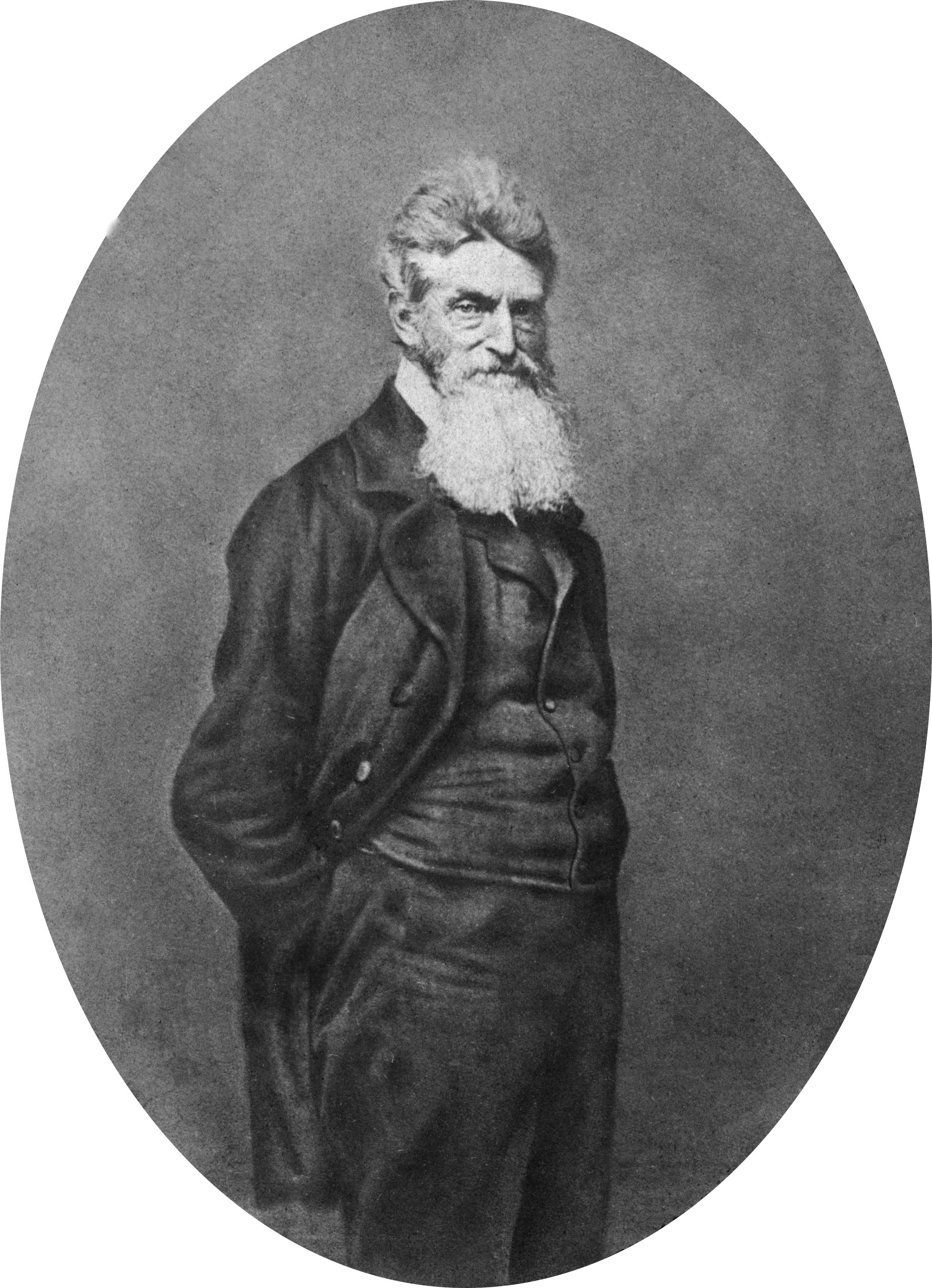
John Brown in 1859

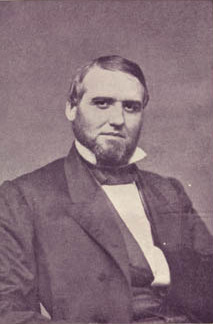
Alexander K. McClure

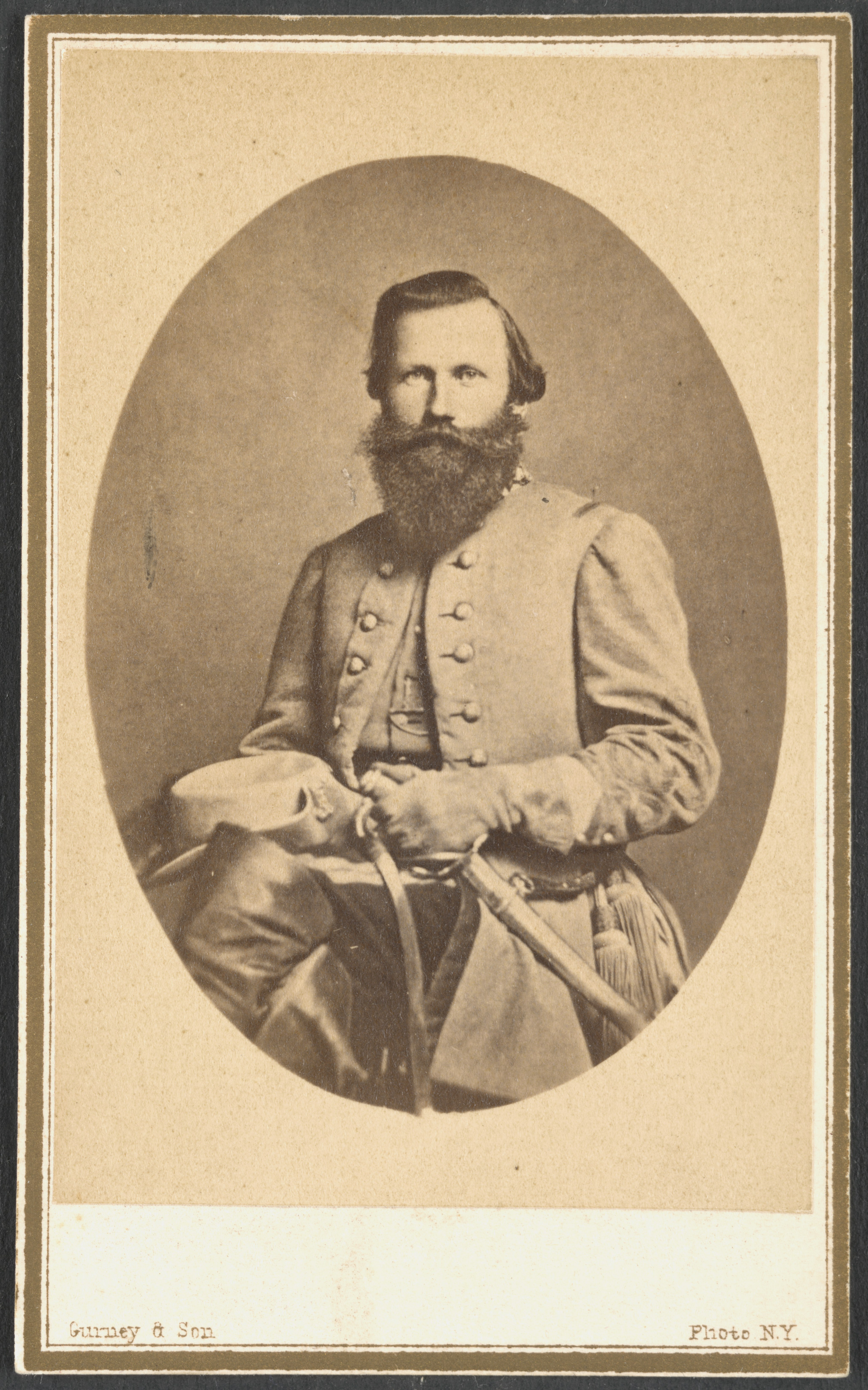
J.E.B. Stuart

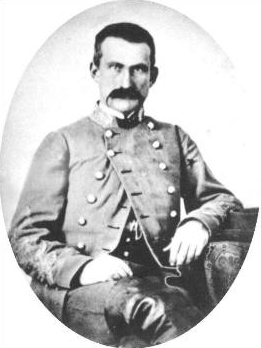
Gen. John McCausland

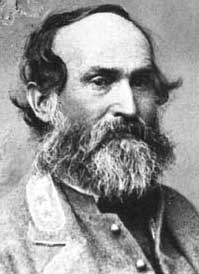
Lieut. Gen. Jubal Early, who ordered Chambersburg burned

=== Civil War legacy ===
==== Accusations of war crimes ====
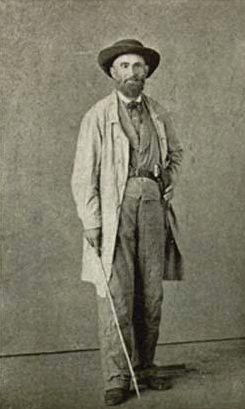
Accused war criminal, General Early, disguised as a farmer, while escaping to Mexico, 1865.

Confederate Lieutenant General Jubal Early was accused of war crimes for ordering Chambersburg burned. The actual burning divided two of his cavalry commanders, as when Maryland-born Gen. Bradley Johnson saw the behavior of Gen. McCausland's troops in Chambersburg, he refused to participate in a similar burning at Cumberland and Hancock, Maryland not far to the south. As a result, both towns survived despite likewise not paying ransoms. Union cavalry under Brig. Gen. William W. Averell, although initially misdirected toward Baltimore and thus late to arrive to prevent the atrocities, also pursued the Confederates, who sustained several defeats and lost most of the Shenandoah Valley by November. Furthermore, when the Army of Northern Virginia surrendered on April 9, 1865, Early escaped to Texas by horseback, where he hoped to find a Confederate force still holding out. He proceeded to Mexico, and from there, sailed to Cuba and Canada. Living in Toronto, he wrote his memoir, A Memoir of the Last Year of the War for Independence, in the Confederate States of America, which focused on his Valley Campaign and was published in 1867.

==== Chambersburg's reconstruction ====
A combination of state and private funding rebuilt Chambersburg. However, many new buildings were erected quickly and not initially built to the original standards. It took more than 30 years to fully restore the town's housing stock to pre-Civil War standards. As discussed further below, Chambersburg was the site of one of the 69 schools established by Pennsylvania to educate children orphaned by the war, and which remained when all other such were closed decades later. Known as "The Scotland School for Veterans Children" after the 1890s, it remained open until 2010 and graduated more than 10,000 children during its lifetime.

==== Memorialization of Civil War ====
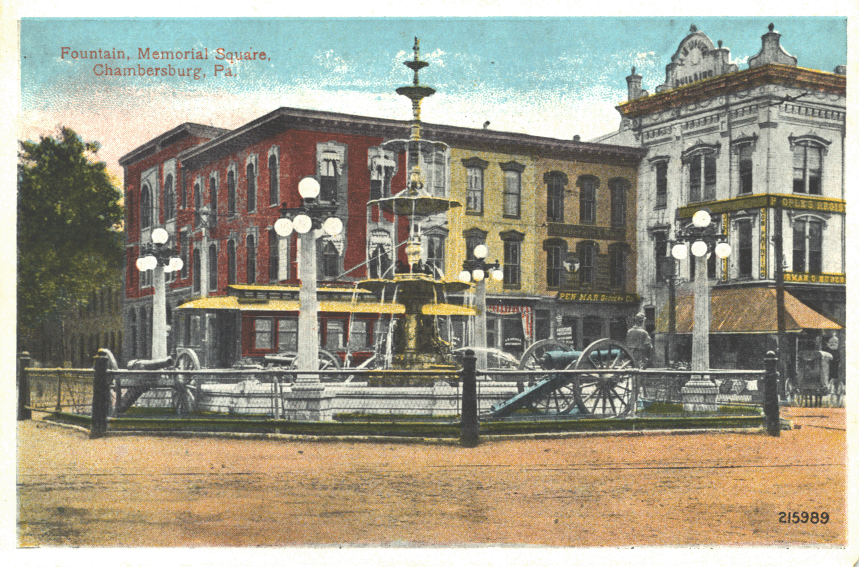
"Fountain, Memorial Square, Chambersburg, Pa." 1921 post card.

Since people from Chambersburg had relatives on both sides during the war, and the war devastated the town, the town event also became a part of the town's identity. On July 17, 1878, 15,000 people attended dedication of Memorial Fountain in the town's center, which honors the Civil War soldiers, and later Chambersburg's fighters in other wars. A statue of a Union soldier stands next to the fountain, facing south to guard against the return of southern raiders.

To this day, the Civil War burning of Chambersburg remains a part of the town's historic identity and yearly memorial events are held, especially near July 30.

Chambersburg has also recently been the subject of study on how people have historically perceived and responded to war tragedies.

=== National Register of Historic Places ===
The following places in Chambersburg are on the National Register of Historic Places:

"Wilson's College for Girls Main Bldg. Chambersburg, Pa." 1921 post card.

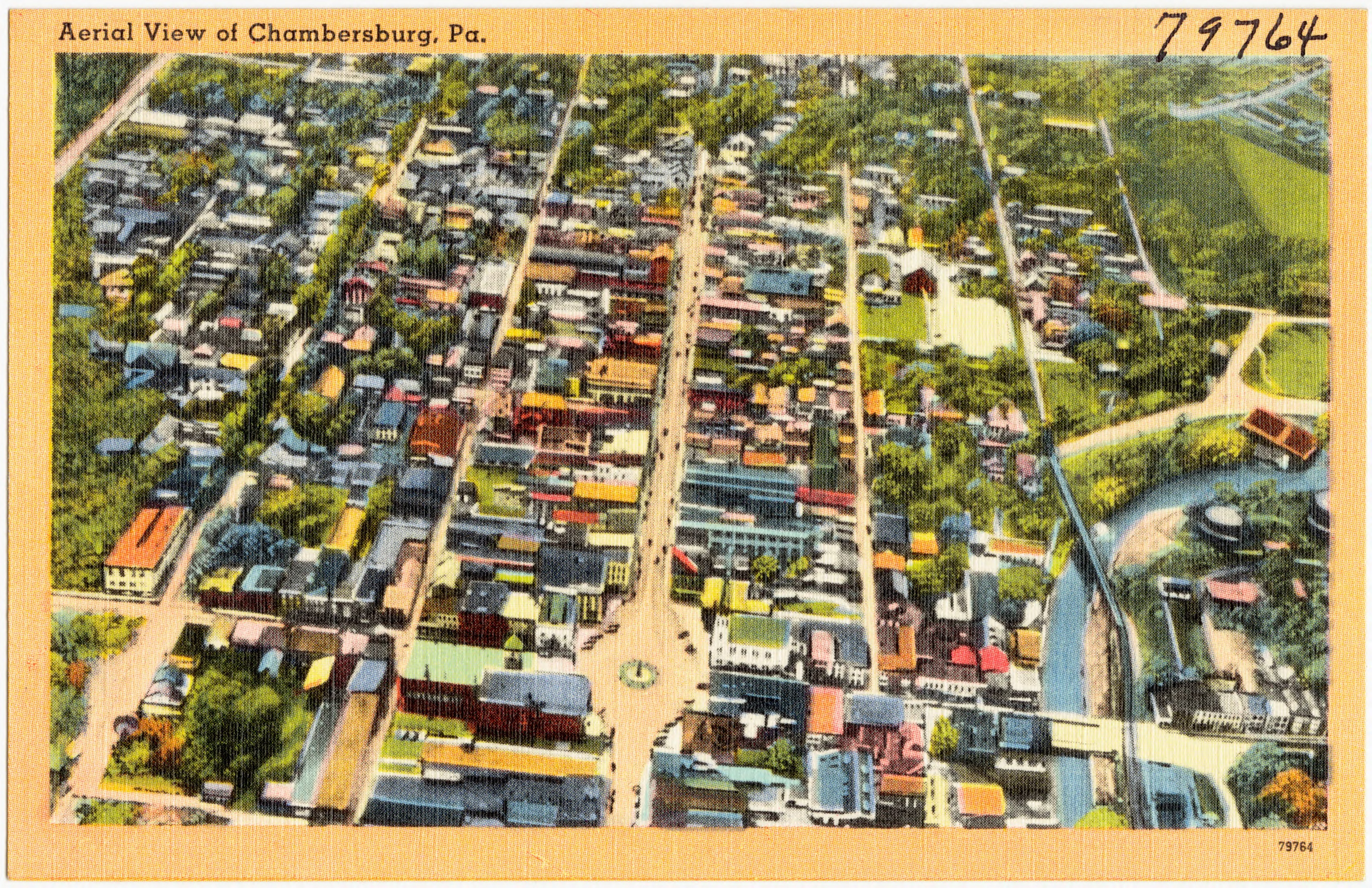
Aerial view of Chambersburg, looking south from the Diamond (town square in the lower center), circa 1940

Site	Address	Listed
Brotherton Farm	SE of Chambersburg on Falling Spring Rd.	1979
John Brown House	225 E. King St.	1970
Chambersburg Historic District	US 11 and US 30 (2,320 acres (940 ha), 159 buildings)	1982
Coldbrook Farm	955 Spring Ln.	1996
James Finley House	Building No. 505, Letterkenny Army Depot	1974
Franklin County Courthouse	1 N. Main St., Memorial Square	1974
Franklin County Jail	NW corner of King and 2nd Sts.	1970
Gass House	E of Chambersburg off U.S. 30	1977
Rocky Spring Presbyterian Church	Rocky Spring Rd., approx. .5 mi (800 m) NW of Funk Rd.,	1994
Masonic Temple	74 S. 2nd St.	1976
Memorial Fountain and Statue	Memorial Square	1978
Townhouse Row	57–85 North Main Street	1978
Wilson College	1015 Philadelphia Ave. (550 acres (220 ha), 17 buildings)	1995
Zion Reformed Church	S. Main and W. Liberty Sts.	1979

=== Historic images ===
Colorized photographs taken from a series of 22 postcard views mailed in 1921.

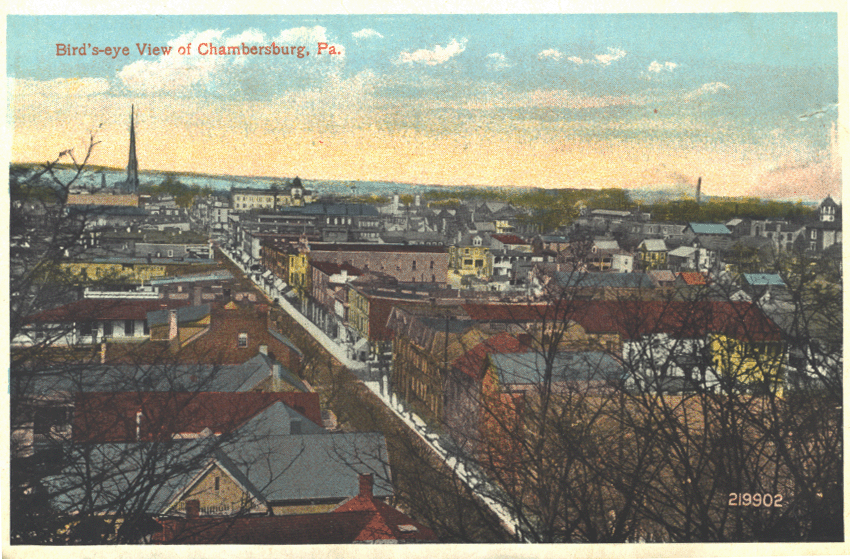
Birds eye view of the borough.

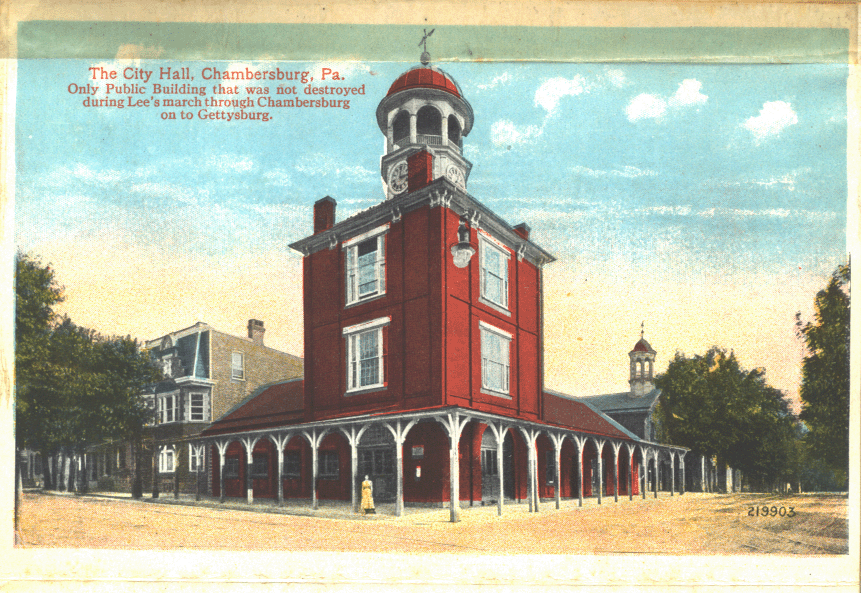
City Hall

King Street Bridge.

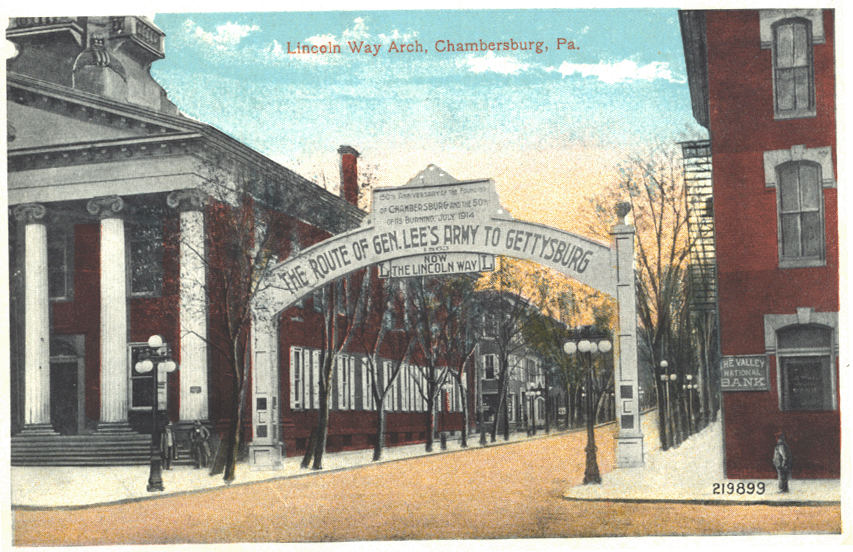
View of the "Lincoln Way Arch" on the Diamond.

== Geography ==
External videos
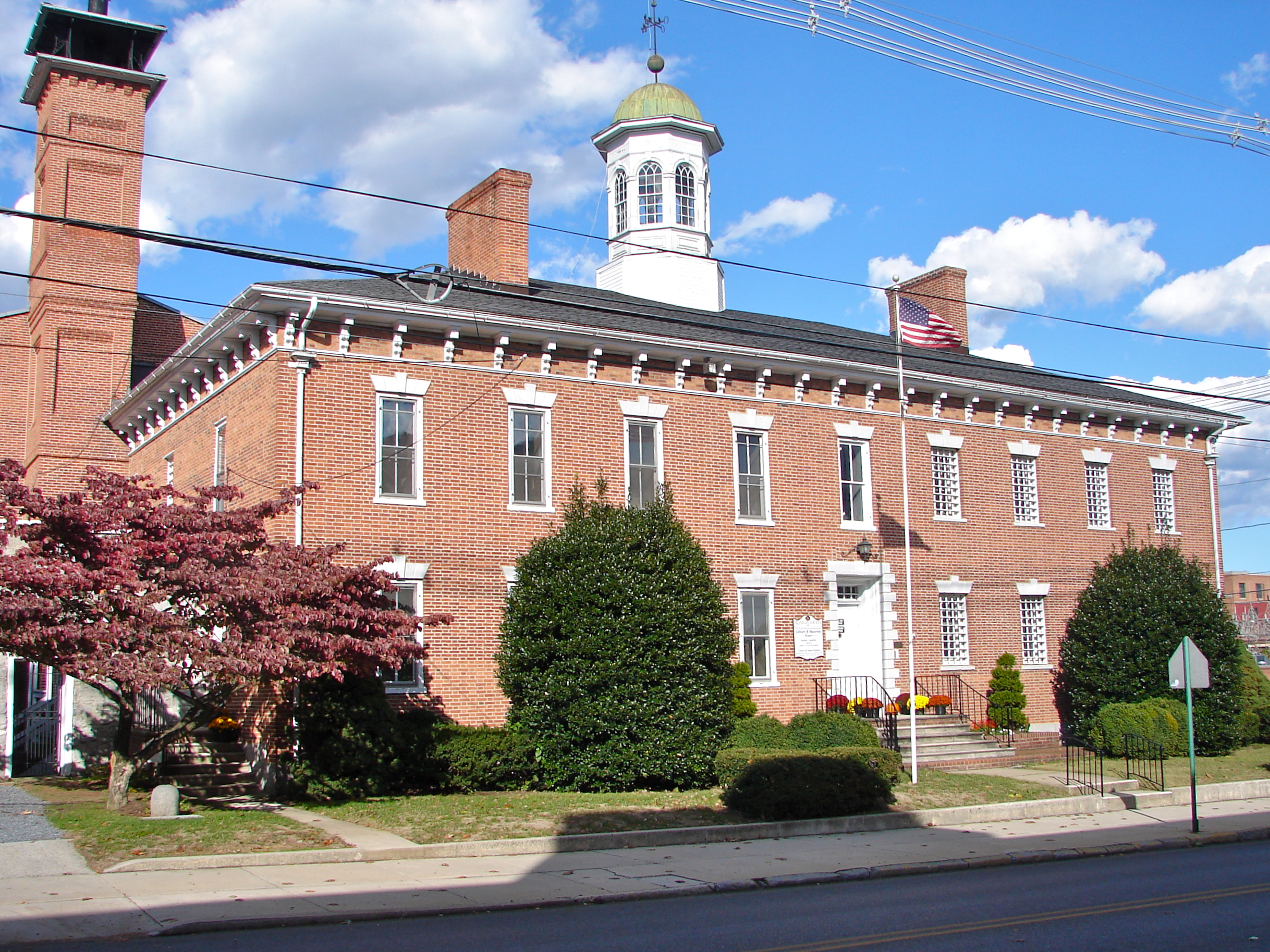
- Chambersburg historic sites, Franklin County Historical Society Includes images of the Old Jail, gallows, and the John Brown House

According to the United States Census Bureau, Chambersburg has a total area of 6.8 square miles (17.6 km^{2}), all land. The elevation is 617 feet (188 m) above sea level. Chambersburg is located in the Cumberland Valley next to the Appalachian Mountains. It also sits right outside of Caledonia State Park, a 1,125-acre (455 ha) park with fishing and hunting areas and hiking trails, including a section of the Appalachian Trail. Also outside of Chambersburg is Michaux State Forest, a 85,000-acre (34,000 ha) forest. Both of these places provide recreation for residents.

Conococheague Creek, a noted trout stream, runs through the center of town. It is a tributary of the Potomac River. The northernmost reach of the Potomac watershed is a few miles north of town.

=== Climate ===
Chambersburg has a cold climate, according to the United States Department of Energy. The area receives anywhere from 38 to 42 inches (970 to 1,070 mm) of precipitation per year. Chambersburg falls within the warmest part of the Humid Continental Climate with some characteristics in the summer of a Humid Subtropical Climate, but bears much more characteristics of the former. The average January low is about 23 °F (−5 °C) and the average high is 37 °F (3 °C). The average July high is 85 °F (29 °C) and the average low is about 65 °F (18 °C).

Climate data for Chambersburg, Pennsylvania (1991–2020 normals, extremes 1894–present)
Month	Jan	Feb	Mar	Apr	May	Jun	Jul	Aug	Sep	Oct	Nov	Dec	Year
Record high °F (°C)	77 (25)	79 (26)	88 (31)	94 (34)	98 (37)	102 (39)	107 (42)	105 (41)	101 (38)	95 (35)	82 (28)	75 (24)	107 (42)
Mean daily maximum °F (°C)	37.4 (3.0)	40.9 (4.9)	50.4 (10.2)	63.2 (17.3)	72.6 (22.6)	80.8 (27.1)	84.9 (29.4)	82.9 (28.3)	75.6 (24.2)	64.0 (17.8)	52.1 (11.2)	41.4 (5.2)	62.2 (16.8)
Daily mean °F (°C)	30.2 (−1.0)	32.7 (0.4)	41.1 (5.1)	52.4 (11.3)	62.1 (16.7)	70.7 (21.5)	74.8 (23.8)	72.9 (22.7)	65.7 (18.7)	54.3 (12.4)	43.5 (6.4)	34.4 (1.3)	52.9 (11.6)
Mean daily minimum °F (°C)	22.9 (−5.1)	24.6 (−4.1)	31.9 (−0.1)	41.6 (5.3)	51.5 (10.8)	60.6 (15.9)	64.7 (18.2)	63.0 (17.2)	55.7 (13.2)	44.6 (7.0)	34.9 (1.6)	27.4 (−2.6)	43.6 (6.4)
Record low °F (°C)	−21 (−29)	−16 (−27)	−8 (−22)	8 (−13)	25 (−4)	32 (0)	41 (5)	37 (3)	28 (−2)	18 (−8)	4 (−16)	−13 (−25)	−21 (−29)
Average precipitation inches (mm)	3.21 (82)	2.61 (66)	3.61 (92)	3.98 (101)	4.13 (105)	4.10 (104)	3.83 (97)	3.82 (97)	4.14 (105)	3.53 (90)	3.12 (79)	3.45 (88)	43.53 (1,106)
Average snowfall inches (cm)	10.0 (25)	8.0 (20)	6.0 (15)	0.3 (0.76)	0.0 (0.0)	0.0 (0.0)	0.0 (0.0)	0.0 (0.0)	0.0 (0.0)	0.0 (0.0)	1.0 (2.5)	5.5 (14)	30.8 (78)
Average precipitation days (≥ 0.01 in)	9.5	9.3	10.0	11.3	12.3	10.8	9.8	9.3	8.8	8.9	8.0	9.0	117.0
Average snowy days (≥ 0.1 in)	4.2	3.5	2.0	0.2	0.0	0.0	0.0	0.0	0.0	0.0	0.6	2.2	12.7
Source: NOAA

== Demographics ==
Historical population
Census	Pop.	Note	%±
1810	1,304		—
1820	1,717		31.7%
1830	2,783		62.1%
1840	3,239		16.4%
1850	3,335		3.0%
1860	5,255		57.6%
1870	6,308		20.0%
1880	6,877		9.0%
1890	7,863		14.3%
1900	8,864		12.7%
1910	11,800		33.1%
1920	13,171		11.6%
1930	13,788		4.7%
1940	14,852		7.7%
1950	17,212		15.9%
1960	17,670		2.7%
1970	17,315		−2.0%
1980	16,174		−6.6%
1990	16,647		2.9%
2000	17,862		7.3%
2010	20,268		13.5%
2020	21,903		8.1%
U.S. Decennial Census

=== 2020 census ===
As of the 2020 census, Chambersburg had a population of 21,903. The median age was 38.2 years. 23.1% of residents were under the age of 18 and 19.9% of residents were 65 years of age or older. For every 100 females there were 89.9 males, and for every 100 females age 18 and over there were 85.6 males age 18 and over.

100.0% of residents lived in urban areas, while 0.0% lived in rural areas.

There were 9,031 households in Chambersburg, of which 28.0% had children under the age of 18 living in them. Of all households, 35.9% were married-couple households, 20.8% were households with a male householder and no spouse or partner present, and 34.5% were households with a female householder and no spouse or partner present. About 35.5% of all households were made up of individuals and 15.5% had someone living alone who was 65 years of age or older.

There were 9,756 housing units, of which 7.4% were vacant. The homeowner vacancy rate was 1.8% and the rental vacancy rate was 6.6%.

Racial composition as of the 2020 census
Race	Number	Percent
White	13,992	63.9%
Black or African American	2,268	10.4%
American Indian and Alaska Native	179	0.8%
Asian	294	1.3%
Native Hawaiian and Other Pacific Islander	10	0.0%
Some other race	2,710	12.4%
Two or more races	2,450	11.2%
Hispanic or Latino (of any race)	5,254	24.0%

=== 2000 census ===
As of the census of 2000, there were 17,862 people, 7,722 households, and 4,386 families residing in the borough. The population density was 2,601.3 inhabitants per square mile (1,004.4/km^{2}). There were 8,305 housing units at an average density of 1,209.5 per square mile (467.0/km^{2}). The racial makeup of the borough was 86.43% White, 7.56% African American, 0.18% Native American, 0.87% Asian, 0.05% Pacific Islander, 3.08% from other races, and 1.83% from two or more races. Hispanic or Latino of any race were 6.38% of the population.

There were 7,722 households, out of which 24.1% had children under the age of 18 living with them, 41.2% were married couples living together, 11.7% had a female householder with no husband present, and 43.2% were non-families. 37.5% of all households were made up of individuals, and 16.8% had someone living alone who was 65 years of age or older. The average household size was 2.16 and the average family size was 2.83.

In the borough the population was spread out, with 20.8% under the age of 18, 9.1% from 18 to 24, 26.8% from 25 to 44, 20.6% from 45 to 64, and 22.7% who were 65 years of age or older. The median age was 40 years. For every 100 females, there were 81.7 males. For every 100 females age 18 and over, there were 77.1 males.

The median income for a household in the borough was $32,336, and the median income for a family was $40,352. Males had a median income of $31,803 versus $21,548 for females. The per capita income for the borough was $19,278. About 9.8% of families and 12.9% of the population were below the poverty line, including 18.3% of those under age 18 and 9.1% of those age 65 or over.

== Economy ==
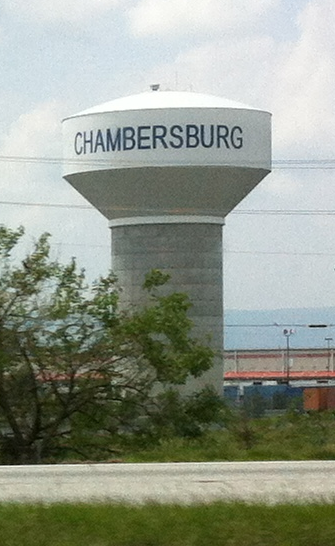
Water tower in Chambersburg

The surrounding area has a large farming population, including many Amish and Mennonite families. Franklin County's largest crop is corn (maize) with 579 farms that cover 29,916 acres (12,107 ha) of land. Franklin also has 344 wheat farms and 299 barley farms which combined cover 14,063 acres (5,691 ha). Manufacturing in Chambersburg includes machinery production, metal fabrication, and food processing according to the 1997 Economic Census of Franklin County. The largest sectors by payroll were manufacturing companies such as T B Wood's Inc., Manitowoc cranes, retail trade, and health care and social assistance. Despite suburban growth, much of the economy of the area is still largely based on agriculture.

Chambersburg's retail sector has grown quickly since 2006 with the opening of retail stores near the newly built Exit 17 of Interstate 81. Several restaurants new to the region have also opened.

Chambersburg's 5 largest employers, according to the Borough's Consolidated Annual Financial Report were in 2017: Summit Health Services/Chambersburg Hospital with 3,600 employees, the Chambersburg Area School District with 1,125 employees, Menno Haven retirement community with 705 employees, Franklin County government with 690 employees, and Ventura Foods with 630 employees

The city's location on Interstate 81 within 100 miles (160 km) of both Washington, D.C., and Baltimore, Maryland encourages trucking and distribution businesses. The Letterkenny Army Depot five miles (8 km) north of town is a major employer. Camp David also employs Chambersburg residents. In 2004 Chambersburg had a per capita personal income (PCPI) of $28,208, below the national average of $33,050.

== Culture ==
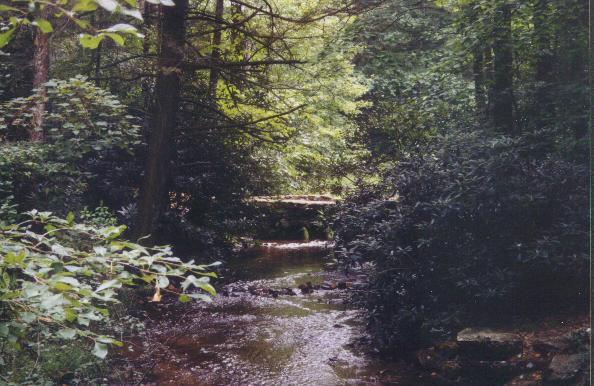
Caledonia State Park

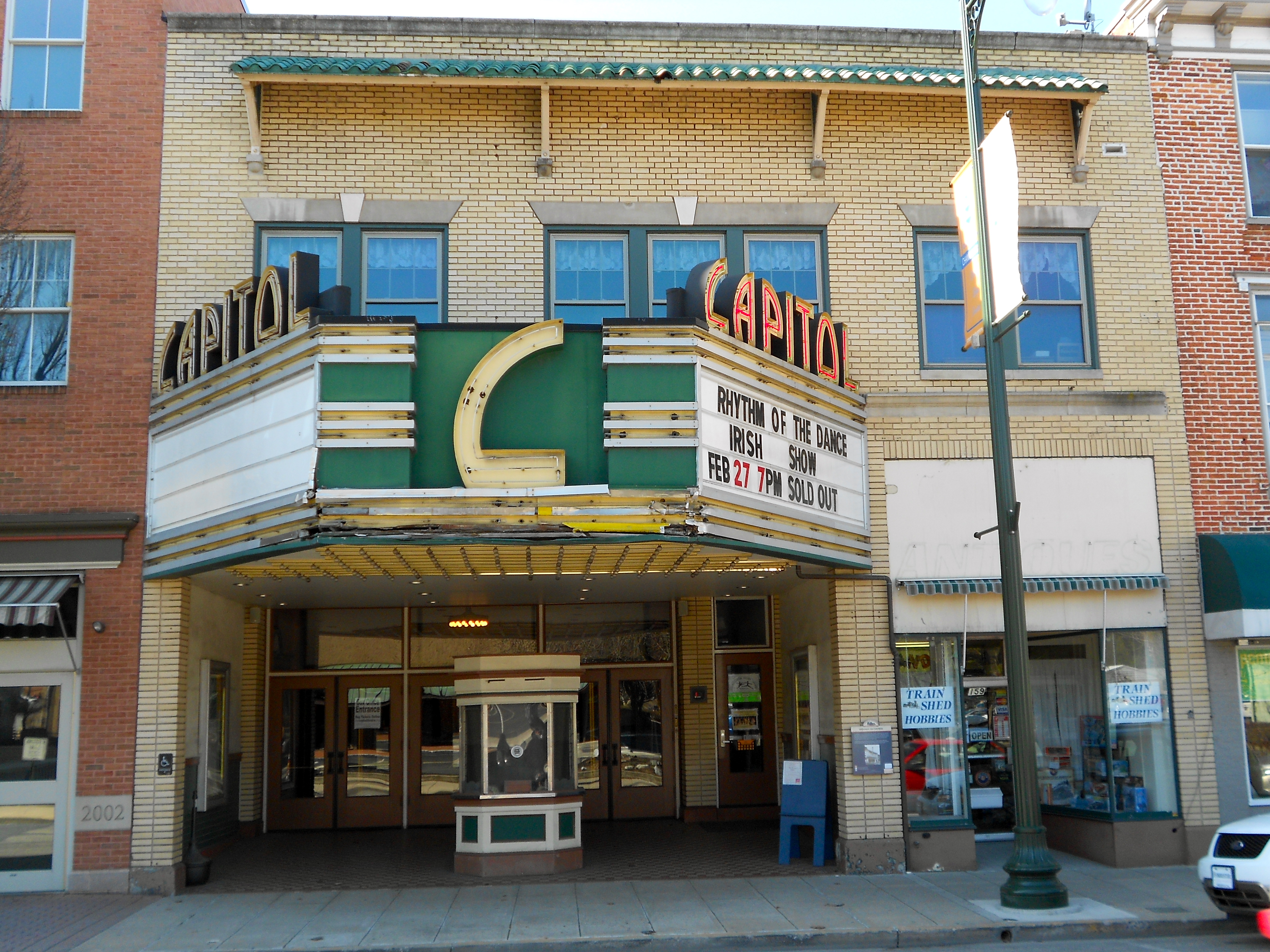
Capitol Theatre

Chambersburg is part of small town America. Recreation includes hunting, sports events such as baseball games at Henninger Field, and high school football games. The town also hosts a professional football team, the Chambersburg Cardinals, that plays in the Gridiron Developmental Football League. People in the area speak in Pittsburgh English or with a Central Pennsylvania accent, over-pronouncing "O's" and "I's". Caledonia State Park provides an area for outdoor activities, with the park especially busy on July 4.

The Capitol Theatre was opened as a movie palace on Main Street in 1927. In 2003, it reopened as the Capitol Theatre Center and is home to the Capitol Theatre Main Stage and Auditorium, Chambersburg Council for the Arts, Caledonia Theatre Company, Chambersburg Ballet Theatre School, and Chambersburg Community Theatre.

Wilson College is home to the Cumberland Valley School of Music, a local school offering private instruction on various musical instruments. It offers a wide range of lessons, classes, workshops, and summer camps, as well as presenting numerous recitals and concerts in Thomson Hall. CVSM sponsors a children's chorus (the Cumberbunds), a community band, a community orchestra, a concert jazz band, and the New Horizons Band, for adults age 50 or older.

Journalist David Brooks in 2001 used Chambersburg and Franklin County to typify Republican "Red America". According to Brooks, there is little obvious income inequality and people don't define their place in society by their income level. They value the work ethic and are anti-union, anti-welfare, pro-free market, and religious social conservatives.

The joke that Pennsylvanians tell about their state is that it has Philadelphia on one end, Pittsburgh on the other, and Alabama in the middle. Franklin County is in the Alabama part . . . . The local culture owes more to Nashville, Houston, and Daytona than to Washington, Philadelphia, or New York . . . The conservatism I found in Franklin County is not an ideological or a reactionary conservatism. It is a temperamental conservatism. People place tremendous value on being agreeable, civil, and kind . . . They value continuity and revere the past.

== Government ==
The municipal government operates under the Pennsylvania Borough Code, with the town council holding both legislative and executive authority. The ten council members are elected from five wards; two from each ward with staggered four-year terms. The mayor administers the police department and can cast tie-breaking votes on the council. Other departments are administered by the Borough Manager. The current Borough Manager is Jeffrey Stonehill. The municipal budget of Chambersburg is abnormally large for a borough of its size, and the borough is one of only a few municipalities nationwide to have a municipal electric and gas utility. As a result of these in-house facilities, Chambersburg has the 14th largest municipal budget in the state.

Walter Bietsch became Mayor on January 2, 2018.

As of January 2020, the town council members are:
Sharon A. Bigler, 4th Ward (D)
Amer Chaudhry, 4th Ward (D)
Allen B. Coffman, 1st Ward (R)
Barbara Beattie, 3rd Ward (D)
Alice C. Elia, 1st Ward (D)(Council President)
Bill Everly, 5th Ward (R)
John Huber, 2nd Ward (R)
Kathy J. Leedy. 3rd Ward (D)
Mike Herbert, 2nd Ward (R) (Council Vice President)
Heath E. Talhelm, 5th Ward (D)

Chambersburg is part of the 13th Congressional District of Pennsylvania and represented by John Joyce (R) in the House of Representatives, and by John Fetterman(D), and Bob Casey Jr.(D) in the Senate.

== Education ==
=== Wilson College ===
Wilson College is a private, Presbyterian-related, liberal arts college founded in 1869 as a women's college and named for its first major donor, Sarah Wilson of Chambersburg. The college has about 800 undergraduate students and is known for its Women With Children, Veterinary Medical Technician, and Equestrian programs. Once an all women's school, it began admitting male students in 2013. In 2009, the school opened the first "green" campus building, housing the science and technology department and featuring a full-length waterfall which begins on the third floor and ends in the building's basement.

=== Public schools ===
Chambersburg Area Senior High School in 1921

Chambersburg Area Senior High School (CASHS), which is home to the CASHS men's tennis team, is a public school with around 2,400 students in grades 9–12, drawn from the borough of Chambersburg and the surrounding townships of Hamilton, Greene, Lurgan, Letterkenny and Guilford. CASHS is accredited by the Middle States Association and has occupied its current facilities since 1955. Principal Dr. Barry Purvis was recognized as the 2006 High School Principal of the Year by the Pennsylvania Association of Elementary and Secondary School Principals.

Until August 2011, J. Frank Faust Junior High School was the only public junior high school for eighth and ninth grade students of the Chambersburg Area School District. It served about 1400 students. J. Frank Faust is now a middle school for Chambersburg area students in the north. CAMS NORTH. It has 6th through 8th grade.

Chambersburg Area Middle School SOUTH was the only middle school, but as of August 2011, it became CAMS SOUTH, 6th through 8th grade. During the 2001–02 school year, CAMS was recognized with the Blue Ribbon School Award of Excellence by the United States Department of Education, the highest award an American school can receive.

The Franklin County Career and Technology Center is also located in Chambersburg. FCCTC is a school designated for students and adults to learn vocational trades while still learning core subjects in school. The school offers training in about 20–30 different concentrations. There are currently six different school districts with students attending FCCTC: Chambersburg, Fannett-Metal, Greencastle-Antrim, Shippensburg, Tuscarora, and Waynesboro.

The Chambersburg school district includes seventeen elementary schools. Many school are being upgraded, rebuilt, or closed because of out-of-date buildings and lack of space. As of July 2008, the current School Board President is Stanley Helman. Other members include Anne Boryan, Renee Sharpe, Norman Blowers, Lori Leedy, Fred Rice, Dave Schiamanna, and Joe Tosten. One seat is currently being filled after the resignation of the previous board president, Dr. Thomas Orndorff.

=== Scotland School for Veterans' Children ===
The Scotland School for Veterans' Children (SSVC) was a state owned school that offered tuition-free residential education for children of Pennsylvania residents who are veterans or are currently serving in the U.S. armed forces. Scotland School was founded in 1863 after two orphaned children begging for food knocked on the door of Pennsylvania's governor, Andrew Gregg Curtin of Centre County north of Chambersburg. Governor Curtin and his wife realized the orphaned children of Pennsylvania's many soldiers had been forgotten. He established 70 'Soldier's Orphan Schools' across the state. Over time, the number of eligible students declined, and in 1895 all of the schools closed except that located in the unincorporated village of Scotland about four miles (6 km) north of Chambersburg. The name was changed to Scotland School for Veteran's Children, then the Pennsylvania Soldiers Orphans Industrial School, and eligibility criteria changed to provide an education to any child of any veteran, whether that veteran was living or deceased (so the school's founding date is sometimes 1895). It had about 300 students in grades 3–12, annually. More than 10,000 students were educated at the school before it closed in 2009, when Pennsylvania's legislators concurred in the decision of Governor Ed Rendell to remove funding. The 186-acre (75 ha) campus contains about 70 buildings including residential cottages.

=== Private schools ===
Private schools include Corpus Christi, a Catholic school with 310 students and over 20 teachers and Cumberland Valley Christian School, a private Christian kindergarten through twelfth grade academy located in Chambersburg. Cumberland Valley Christian School is affiliated with the Open Door Church and has approximately four hundred students. Other private schools include the Montessori Academy of Chambersburg (22 months-12th grade, non-sectarian) and Shalom Christian Academy (K-12, Mennonite affiliation) a pre-K through twelfth grade academy with approximately seven hundred students, and several elementary schools with Mennonite, Baptist, Brethren, Christian Science, and other religious orientations.

=== Library ===
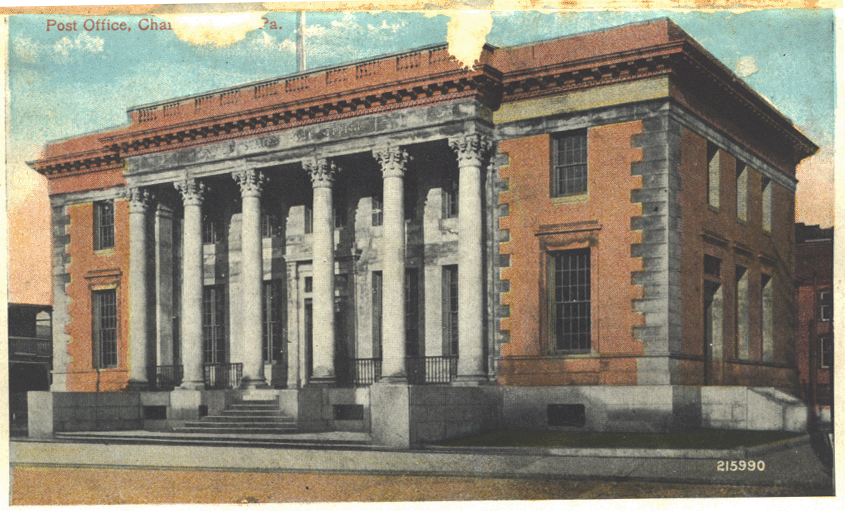
1921 post card of the Post Office building, which currently houses Coyle Free Library.

Coyle Free Library has roots going back to 1891, when a library of 166 books was organized by the local Afternoon Club. A member of the club, Blanche Coyle, left a bequest of $30,435 (~$680,746 in 2024) in 1915 to construct a library building. The building was completed in 1924, located at the corner of Second and Queen Streets. Later the library was made part of the Franklin County Library and began to receive funds from the County and State, though the Afternoon Club still donated funds through at least 1979. The building it currently occupies is a former post office.

== Media ==
=== Newspapers ===
The Chambersburg Public Opinion is the only daily newspaper published in town, and has weekday circulation about 17,000. It was founded in 1869 and is now owned by Gannett. The town is also served by The Herald-Mail out of Hagerstown, Maryland.

=== Television and radio ===
Franklin County is in the Harrisburg-Lancaster-York television market. Television reception can be poor because of the surrounding mountains. Harrisburg PBS station WITF-TV rebroadcasts via low-powered translator W34FM-D. All Harrisburg TV stations are available off air and on cable. WHTM is the first network affiliated television station to establish a bureau in Chambersburg. WDVM-TV and WWPB broadcast from nearby Hagerstown, Maryland.

Chambersburg shares a radio market, the 165th largest in the United States, with Waynesboro, Pennsylvania, and Hagerstown, Maryland.

== Sister city ==
- Gotemba, Shizuoka, Japan

== Notable people ==
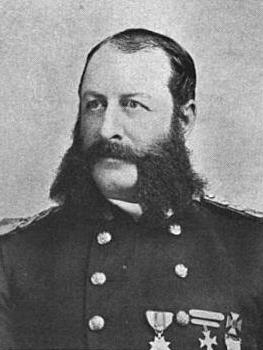
Brady

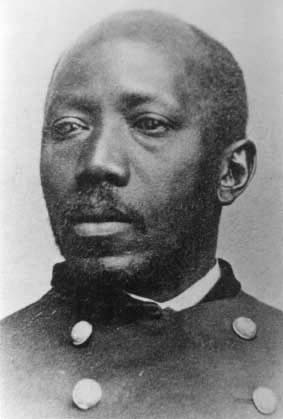
Delany

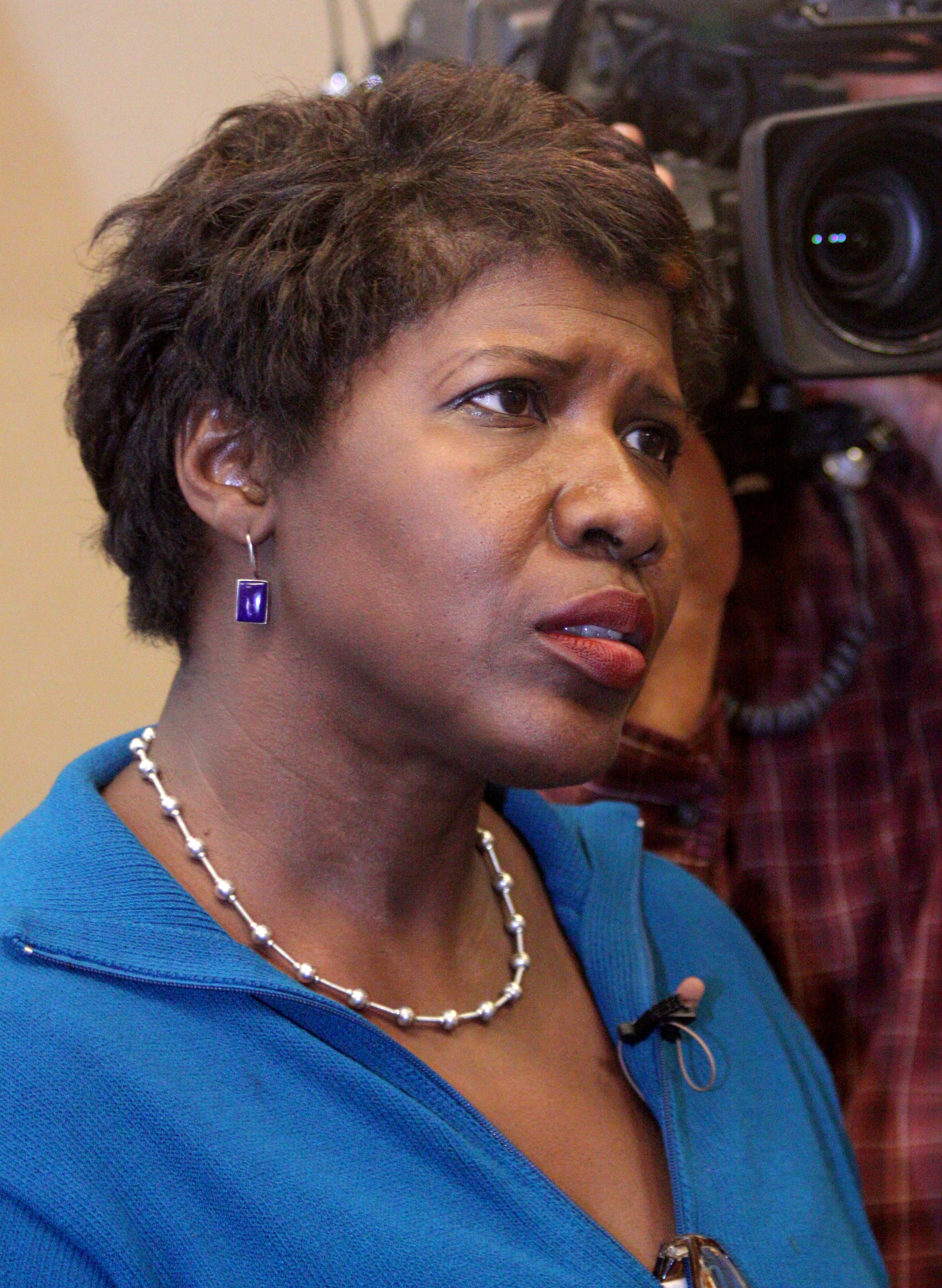
Ifill

- Betty Andujar, Texas politician
- D. Dudley Bloom, United States Navy officer and American businessman
- George K. Brady, United States Army officer
- Ike Brookens, MLB player in 1975 with the Detroit Tigers
- Tom Brookens, MLB player from 1979 to 1990 Detroit Tigers
- Margaret Corbin, Revolutionary War soldier known as "Captain Molly"
- Martin Delany, Abolitionist publisher and first African-American field officer in the U.S. Army
- Chris Donahue, United States Army general and commander of U.S. Army Europe and Africa
- Gus Dorner Major League Baseball pitcher (1902–1909)
- Ludwig Denig, folk artist and apothecary
- Henry Burchard Fine (1858–1928) dean at Princeton University
- Steven Fogarty, professional ice hockey player - New York Rangers
- Patrick Gass (1771–1870), the last surviving member of the Lewis and Clark expedition
- Kenton Harper, Virginia newspaper editor and Confederate army general
- John Grier Hibben, later President of Princeton University
- Stephen D. Houston, Mayanist scholar, epigrapher, and anthropologist
- John Hughes, archbishop of the Roman Catholic Archdiocese of New York
- Gwen Ifill (1955–2016) Journalist and author
- Lil Skies, Hip Hop artist, born in Chambersburg on August 4, 1998
- Alexander McClure, editor of the Franklin Repository from 1852 to 1864
- Bob Moorhead, pitcher for the New York Mets
- Mike Mowrey, professional baseball third baseman
- John Putch, actor, filmmaker, son of Jean Stapleton
- David Fullerton Robison, a U.S. Representative
- The Shackeltons, Post-Punk band formed in 2004
- Jean Gurney Fine Spahr (1861–1935), social reformer
- Mitchell Stahl, professional indoor volleyball player
- Jean Stapleton, actress, Edith Bunker on All in the Family
- Abraham Stouffer, founder of Stouffville, Ontario, Canada
- Frank Thomson, president of the Pennsylvania Railroad
- Zelda Wynn Valdes, fashion designer born in Chambersburg
- Joseph Winters, an African-American inventor and abolitionist

== See also ==
- Chambersburg Raid
- Fayetteville, Pennsylvania
- Franklin County Regional Airport
- Guilford, Pennsylvania
- The Valley of the Shadow
- WHGT
- Bloom Brothers Department Stores

== Sources ==
- Alexander, Ted. Southern Revenge!: Civil War History of Chambersburg, Pennsylvania (White Mane Publishing Company, 1989).
- Coddington, Edwin B. "Prelude to Gettysburg: The Confederates Plunder Pennsylvania." Pennsylvania History 30.2 (1963): 123-157. online
- Smith, Everard H. "Chambersburg: Anatomy of a Confederate Reprisal." American Historical Review 96#2 (1991): 432-455 in JSTOR on 1863
- Bates, Samuel P. (1887). History of Franklin County. Chicago: Warner, Beers, & Co.
- Chambers, George (1856). Tribute to the Principles, Virtues, Habits, and Public Usefulness, of the Irish and Scotch Early Settlers of Pennsylvania. Chambersburg.
- Chambersburg Community Development Committee (1945). Chambersburg, Its Record and Its Prospects. Chambersburg: Greater Chambersburg Chamber of Commerce. p. 165.
- "Franklin County Historical Society – Kittochtinny".
- Garrard, Lewis Hector (1856). Chambersburg in the Colony and the Revolution: A Sketch. Philadelphia: J.B. Lippincott. "chambersburg."
- M'Cauley, I.H. (1878). Historical Sketch of Franklin County, Pennsylvania. Chambersburg.
- Images of America: Chambersburg, Maurice Leonard Marotte III & Janet Kay Pollard (Arcadia, 2005)
