= Franklin County Career and Technology Center =

Coordinates: 39.90075°N 77.68202°W

Information
- Grades: 10-12
- Website: www.franklinctc.com

The Franklin County Career and Technology Center is vocational high school located in Chambersburg, Pennsylvania. It serves Grades 10-12. The program at FCCTC includes half a year of academics and half a year of shop. It has six participating school districts.

== Administration ==
The school is run by a joint operating committee made up of representatives from the participating school districts. One each from Greencastle-Antrim, Shippensburg, and Fannett-Metal; two from Waynesboro, and three from Chambersburg. FCCTC does have its own principal.

== Participating school districts ==
- Chambersburg Area School District
- Waynesboro Area School District
- Tuscarora School District
- Fannett-Metal School District
- Shippensburg Area School District
- Greencastle-Antrim School District
