= Brennan Marion =

American football player and coach (born 1987)

Current position
- Title: Offensive coordinator & quarterbacks coach
- Team: Colorado
- Conference: Big 12

Biographical details
- Born: August 25, 1987 (age 39); Hampton, Virginia, U.S.
- Education: University of Tulsa

Playing career
- 2005: Foothill
- 2006: De Anza
- 2007–2008: Tulsa
- 2009: Miami Dolphins*
- Position: Wide receiver

Coaching career (HC unless noted)
- 2011: West Valley (WR)
- 2012: Harker School (CA) (WR)
- 2013: St. Patrick-St. Vincent HS (CA)
- 2014: Waynesboro Area HS (PA)
- 2015: Arizona State (OQC)
- 2016: Oklahoma Baptist (RB)
- 2017–2018: Howard (OC/QB)
- 2019: William & Mary (OC/QB)
- 2020: Hawaii (WR)
- 2021: Pittsburgh (WR)
- 2022: Texas (PGC/WR)
- 2023–2024: UNLV (OC/QB)
- 2025: Sacramento State
- 2026–present: Colorado (OC/QB)

Head coaching record
- Overall: 7–5 (college); 11–10 (high school)

Accomplishments and honors

Awards
- As a player: C-USA Newcomer of the Year (2007); First-team All-C-USA (2008); Second-team All-C-USA (2007)

Brennan Randall Marion (born August 25, 1987) is an American college football coach and former player who is the offensive coordinator and quarterbacks coach at the University of Colorado Boulder. He previously served as the head coach at California State University, Sacramento (Sacramento State) in 2025 and was previously the offensive coordinator and quarterbacks coach at the University of Nevada, Las Vegas (UNLV) from 2023 to 2024.

Marion played wide receiver and was signed by the Miami Dolphins as an undrafted free agent in 2009, but never played in an official game. He played college football for Foothill, De Anza, and Tulsa. He set the single-season NCAA FBS yards-per-catch record in a single season at 31.9 and finished as the NCAA career leader at 28.7 yards-per-catch. He had back-to-back 1,000-yard receiving seasons.

== Early life ==
Marion started high school at Steel Valley, in Homestead, Pennsylvania. Marion was a four-year letter winner in football, basketball, and track at Greensburg-Salem High School in Greensburg, Pennsylvania. As a senior, Marion had 23 receptions for 400 yards and four touchdowns. However, his only scholarship offer was a partial scholarship to Temple, and because of his low SAT scores, he decided to attend junior college.

== College career ==
=== Junior college ===
Marion began his college career at Foothill College, where he played one season as a tight end and halfback. After 2005, Marion transferred from Foothill to De Anza College in Cupertino, California, where he led all California junior college receivers with 1,196 yards and 16 touchdowns. Switching from a blocking role at Foothill to a primary receiving role at De Anza, Marion earned junior college All-America honors.

=== Tulsa ===
In his first season at Tulsa, Marion led the nation in yards per reception at 31.9, breaking an FBS record in the process. Marion finished the season with 39 receptions for 1,244 yards and 11 touchdowns and was named Conference USA Newcomer of the Year. He was a second-team All-Conference USA selection and was part of just the third team in FBS history to have three 1,000-yard receivers.

As a senior, Marion played 13 games, finishing with 43 receptions for 1,112 yards and eight touchdowns. He earned first-team All-Conference USA honors, leading the nation in yards per reception for the second consecutive season. However, he suffered a torn left ACL on Tulsa's final offensive play of the Conference USA Championship Game, forcing him to miss the GMAC Bowl and any postseason all-star games.

Marion finished his FBS career averaging 28.7 yards per reception on 83 catches. That broke Wesley Walker's record for average per reception for a player with at least 75 career receptions.

=== Statistics ===
Year	Team	Games		Receiving			
Year	Team	GP	GS	Rec	Yards	Avg	TD
2006	De Anza CC	10	—	60	1,196	19.9	15
2007	Tulsa	14	6	39	1,244	31.9	11
2008	Tulsa	13	13	43	1,112	25.9	8
Career (NCAA)		27	19	82	2,356	28.7	19

== Professional career ==
Due to his knee injury, Marion attended the 2009 NFL scouting combine but did not participate. He went undrafted in the 2009 NFL draft, but signed a free agent contract with the Miami Dolphins. During training camp, Marion re-tore his ACL in his left knee. He was placed on injured reserve on August 4, 2009.

== Coaching career ==
=== Early career ===
Marion was the head coach of Saint Patrick Saint Vincent in Vallejo, California in 2013. In his first year, he led the Bruins to a first-round home playoff loss, just one year after the team finished with a 1–9 record. Marion resigned and moved to Pennsylvania to take another head coaching position at Waynesboro Area Senior High School in 2014. He led the Indians to their first winning season and divisional title in 22 years. His Indians also won 'Team of the Year' as selected by WHAG-TV. During Marion's tenure at Waynesboro High School, he developed the GoGo offense, which incorporates principles of old-school triple-option offenses with modern spread concepts.

=== Arizona State ===
In 2015, Brennan served a quality control coach for Arizona State.

=== Oklahoma Baptist ===
In 2016, he was a running back coach at Oklahoma Baptist University.

=== Howard ===
From 2017 to 2018, Marion served as the offensive coordinator at Howard University. In his first game as Howard's offensive coordinator, Marion's offense helped the FCS Bison defeat UNLV on September 13, 2017. The win by the 45–point underdog Bison was the largest point-spread upset in college football history.

=== William and Mary ===
In 2019, Marion followed head coach Mike London from Howard over to the College of William and Mary where he began serving as offensive coordinator.

=== Hawaii ===
Marion resigned from his position at William & Mary to serve as the wide receivers coach on Todd Graham's inaugural staff at Hawaii for the 2020 season.

=== Pittsburgh ===
On February 15, 2021, Marion joined the staff at the University of Pittsburgh as the wide receivers coach.

=== Texas ===
On December 31, 2021, Marion was named passing game coordinator and wide receivers coach at the University of Texas at Austin under head coach Steve Sarkisian.

=== UNLV ===
In 2023, Marion was hired as the offensive coordinator and quarterbacks coach at the University of Nevada, Las Vegas (UNLV) under head coach Barry Odom.

=== Sacramento State ===
On December 20, 2024, Marion was named as the head football coach at California State University, Sacramento (Sacramento State). In 2025 with the Hornets, Marion led the team to a 7–5 record, ranking third in the Football Championship Subdivision with 262.6 rushing yards per game, as well as averaging 33.8 points per game.

=== Colorado ===
On December 4, 2025, Marion was hired as the offensive coordinator and quarterbacks coach at the University of Colorado Boulder under head coach Deion Sanders.

== Head coaching record ==
=== College ===
Year	Team	Overall	Conference	Standing	Bowl/playoffs
Sacramento State Hornets (Big Sky Conference) (2025)
2025	Sacramento State	7–5	5–3	T–4th	
Sacramento State:		7–5	5–3		
Total:		7–5			

=== High school ===
Year	Team	Overall	Conference	Standing	Bowl/playoffs
St. Patrick-St. Vincent Bruins () (2013)
2013	St. Patrick-St. Vincent	5–6	3–3	4th	
St. Patrick-St. Vincent:		5–6	3–3		
Waynesboro Area Indians () (2014)
2014	Waynesboro Area	6–4	6–1	1st	
Waynesboro Area:		6–4	6–1		
Total:		11–10			
National championship Conference title Conference division title or championship game berth

== See also ==
- List of NCAA major college football yearly receiving leaders
