= The Shackeltons =

- (From left to right) Mark Redding, Sean Hallock, Dan Schuchman, Eric Fisak, and Justin McDaniel.

Background information
- Origin: Chambersburg, Pennsylvania, United States
- Genres: Post-punk revival Indie rock Post-industrial
- Years active: 2004-Present
- Labels: Think Loud Entertainment; Loveless Records
- Members: Mark Redding (Vocals); Justin Fair (Guitar); Rebecca Satellite (Guitar); Angela Phillips (Bass); DD (Drums)
- Past members: Andrew Platt (Bass/Drums); Sean Hallock (Drums); Justin McDaniel (Bass); Josh McDaniel (Bass); Dan Schuchman (Guitar); Joe de Salis (Drums); Ryan Egolf (Guitar); Eric Fisak (Guitar)
- Website: www.theshackeltons.com

The Shackeltons are a post-punk band from Chambersburg, Pennsylvania. Despite the spelling, they are named after the Antarctic explorer Ernest Shackleton.

They received some of their first non-local attention from Seattle, Washington radio station KEXP, which led to shows in several major cities and a contract with Seattle's Loveless Records. They received favorable write-ups in Spin, Rolling Stone and the online music blog New Rock News 43 and appeared at SXSW in Austin, Texas. Their self-titled debut album was released January 29, 2008.

== History ==
According to the band's website, the band formed in June 2004 and began performing publicly the following September. They recorded a 5-song EP at a local church with Michael Mateer as recording engineer. This netted them an opportunity to play in the basement of New York City's Knitting Factory. They met Brooklyn based instrumental band Skeletonbreath, who joined them for numerous shows in a Chambersburg Homeless Shelter warehouse.

In March 2005 the Shackeltons played a live radio broadcast on WEEO-FM, at that time "103.7 the Revolution". The 9-song session netted six tracks for their second release. In October 2005, they returned with Mateer to the same church where they had recorded their first EP, to do a full-length 10-song CD Red; the song "Yellow Cadillac" brought them to the attention of Chris Walla of Death Cab for Cutie. In December, they recorded a live show in Pittsburgh with a slightly new lineup (Justin McDaniel replaced older brother Josh McDaniel on bass, and 14-year-old Sean Hallock replaced Jonathan Slick on drums).

In the spring of 2006, the band tried (and failed) to gain the attention of several New York labels. Meanwhile, Red had gained the attention of Seattle station KEXP. In November of that year, during CMJ's annual New York festival, the Shackeltons played a live session on KEXP and a performance at New York's Sin-é. These led to them being signed to Seattle's Loveless Records. Meanwhile, a few months earlier, they had recorded another EP—the Creme EP—with Mateer. In March 2007 the Shackeltons played at Neumos in Seattle to an audience of nearly 1,000, and headed for Los Angeles to record for Loveless with producers Sam Jones and Tom Biller.

As that CD circulated before its January 29, 2008 release date, the band continued to gain notice. In November 2007 they became a Myspace feature band for a week, averaging 15,000 plays a day during that time. They were Spin's featured artist of the day on January 18, 2008, and on December 11, 2007 Rolling Stone's Rock & Roll Daily blog described them as "brilliant".

== Members ==
- Mark Redding (vocals)
- Rebecca Satellite (guitar since 2013)
- Angela Phillips (bass since 2013)
- Justin Fair (guitar since 2014)

Source for members and dates:

== Former members ==
- Andrew PLatt (bass/drums until 2014)
- Eric Fisak (guitar until 2014)
- Ryan Egolf (guitar until 2014)
- Joe de Salis (drums until 2014)
- Sean Hallock (drums until 2012)
- Justin McDaniel (bass until 2012)
- Dan Schuchman (guitar until Summer 2009)
- Josh "Frylock" McDaniel (bass through Red in late 2005)
- Jonathan Slick (drums through Red in late 2005)

== Discography ==
- Five Army (EP, self-released, 2005)
- Live on 103.7 (self-released, 2005)
- Red (self-released, 2005)
- Live in Pittsburg (self-released, 2006)
- Green (EP, self-released, 2006)
- Creme EP (EP, self-released, 2006)
- "Your Movement" on Live at KEXP Volume Three (2007)
- The Shackeltons - Loveless Records (2008)
- Mum (EP, self-released, 2012)
- "Records"- Think Loud Entertainment (2014)

Sources for discography:
