= Joseph Winters =

African-American abolitionist and inventor

Joseph Richard Winters (August 29, 1824 – November 29, 1916) was an African-American abolitionist and inventor who, on May 7, 1878, received U.S. Patent number 203,517 for a wagon-mounted fire escape ladder. On April 8, 1879, he received U.S. Patent number 214,224 for an improvement on the ladder. On May 16, 1882, he received U.S. Patent number 258,186 for a fire escape ladder that could be affixed to buildings.

It has been erroneously cited that Winters was the original inventor of the wagon-mounted fire escape. Winters' version was patented 29 years after George Huttman and George Kornelio initially introduced the idea in 1849.(Needs Ref.) However, Winters' ladder replaced the wooden ladder with a metal frame and parallel steps. Winters' innovation was utilized by the Chambersburg, Pennsylvania fire department who mounted the ladder on a horse-drawn wagon.

Joseph R. Winters was born in Leesburg, Virginia to an African-American brickmaker and a Shawnee Indian mother, who was the daughter of a noted herbalist and medical practitioner referred to as the "Indian doctor woman." The family relocated to Chambersburg, Pennsylvania around 1840. Joseph Winters worked as a farmer, and later as a mechanic for the Cumberland Valley Railroad. He was a noted fisherman and hunter; "Black and white residents long remembered him for his great nature knowledge and skills, especially in fishing and fly making." He was also a poet and lyricist, and composed a song supporting the 1900 presidential campaign of William Jennings Bryan, as well as another song entitled "Ten Days after the Battle of Gettysburg." He also wrote an autobiography with the same title, but no copies seem to have survived.

During the time Winters lived in Chambersburg, he was active in the Underground Railroad. It has been said that it was Winters who arranged the famous meeting between Frederick Douglass and John Brown before the latter's abortive attempt to take the federal arsenal at Harpers Ferry in 1859.

Winters died in 1916 and is buried in Mount Vernon Cemetery in Chambersburg.

In 2005, the Pennsylvania Historical and Museum Commission erected a historical marker honoring Winters at the Junior Hose & Truck Company #2 of Chambersburg at 130 North Second Street.
