= Zion Reformed Church (Chambersburg, Pennsylvania) =

Historic church in Pennsylvania, United States

- U.S. National Register of Historic Places
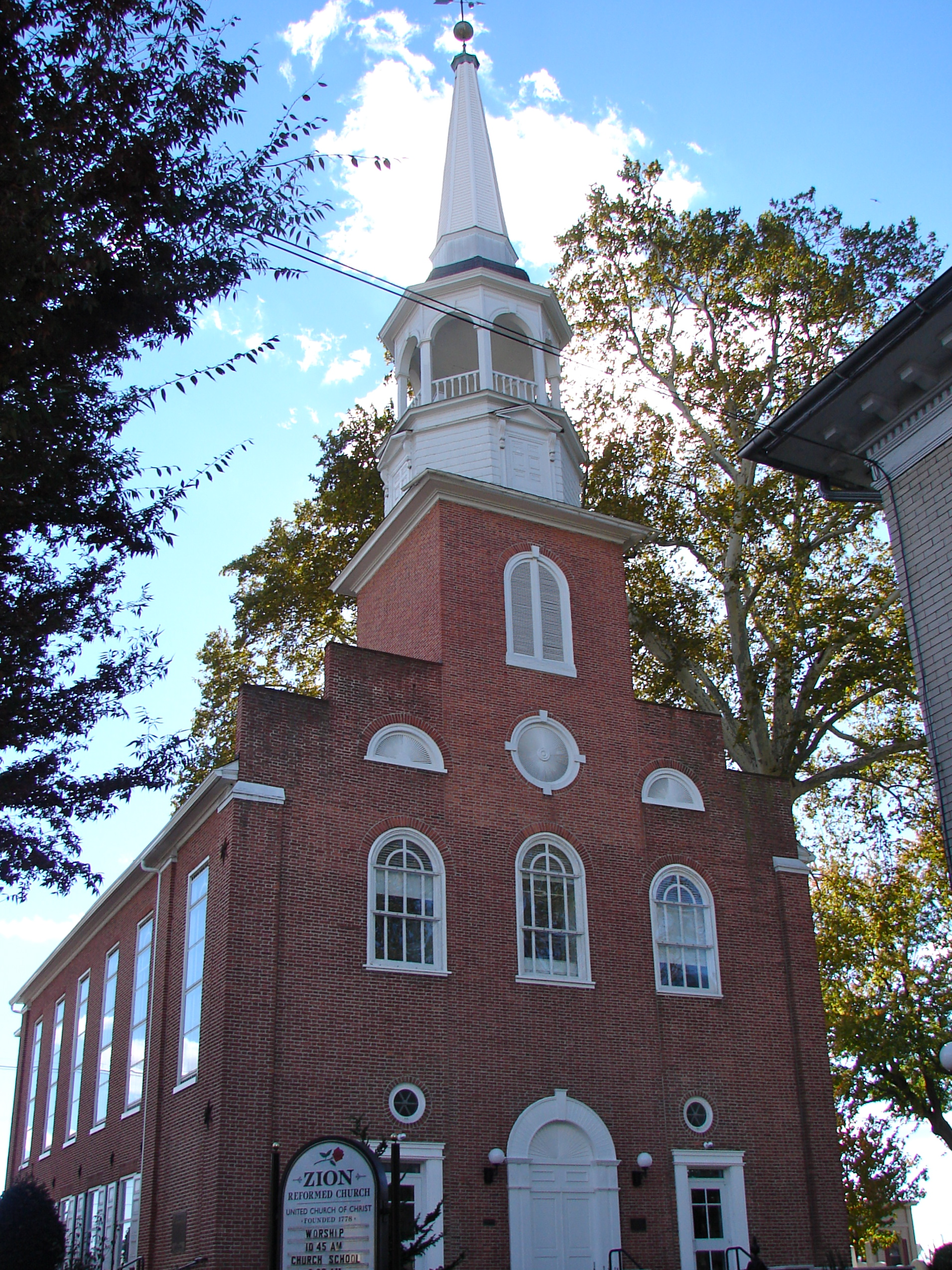

- Location within Pennsylvania Location within the United States
- Location: S. Main and W. Liberty Sts., Chambersburg, Pennsylvania
- Coordinates: 39°55′58″N 77°39′48″W
- Area: 0.8 acres (0.32 ha)
- Built: 1811-1813
- Architectural style: Georgian, "Wren" style
- NRHP reference No.: 79002228
- Added to NRHP: December 17, 1979

Zion Reformed Church of the United Church of Christ, more commonly known as Zion Reformed Church or Zion UCC is a congregation of the United Church of Christ in the borough of Chambersburg, Pennsylvania, United States. It belongs to the Mercersburg Association of the Penn Central Conference of the United Church of Christ.

The congregation was organized in 1778 or 1779, but its first church building was not built until 1811–1813. This structure is still used for weekly worship, besides special services and other events, and is listed on the National Register of Historic Places.

== History ==
The church is one of three churches in Chambersburg known as "rose rent churches." Every June these churches pay a single rose in rent to the descendants of Benjamin and Jane Chambers, according to the terms of the 18th century deeds. The church is built in a classic Georgian style. For many years it had the largest auditorium in Chambersburg and hosted many well-known speakers, including Archbishop John Hughes in 1842 and Schuyler Colfax in 1867, then Speaker of the House and later Vice President.

Besides the building itself, its two original chandeliers are of interest. The chandelier in the entryway is plain and has been electrified. The other, in the sanctuary, is a Waterford crystal chandelier, and is similar to some which are found in St. Paul's Cathedral, although it is larger than them. It is lit on Thanksgiving Eve and Christmas Eve every year.

It was added to the National Register of Historic Places in 1979, and is located in the Chambersburg Historic District.

=== Pastors ===
- Jacob Weimer (c.1783- )
- J.C. Faber ( -1789)
- J.P. Stoeck ( - c.1804)
- James Hoffman (1807-1818)
- F.A. Ramhauser (1818-1833)
- Hamilton Van Dyke (1832-1833)
- Henry L. Rice (1834-1837)
- Jacob Helffenstein (1838-1842)
- W.W. Bonnell (1842-1845)
- Alfred Nevin (1845-1852)
- S.N. Callender (1852-1856)
- Samuel Philips (1857-1861)
- Benjamin Bausman (1861-1863)
- P.S. Davis (1864-1876)
- W.C. Cremer (1876-1884)
- W.C. Schaeffer (1884-1904)
- P.A. DeLong (1905-1907)
- I.W. Hendricks (1907-1936)
- Paul T. Stonesiffer (1937-1947)
- Joseph H. Miller (1948-1958)
- Robert Dean Morrison (1958-1987)
- Jeffrey R. Diller (1987- )
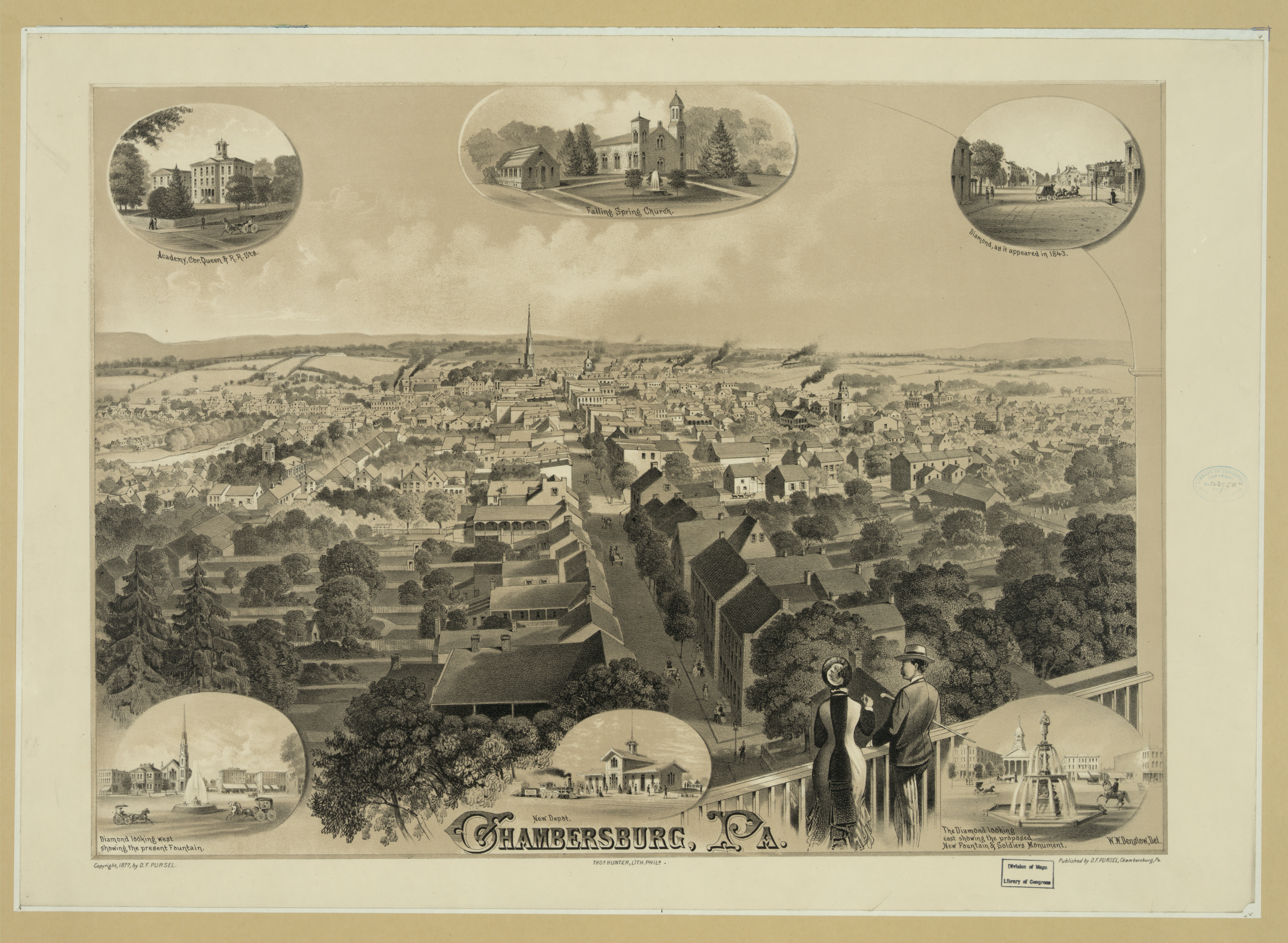
1877 view from Zion's steeple looking north toward Chambersburg's Diamond or central square, marked by the tall steeple in the distance.

== See also ==
- Zion Reformed United Church of Christ
