= Zelda Wynn Valdes =

American fashion designer and costumer

- Born: Zelda Christian Barbour; June 28, 1905; Chambersburg, Pennsylvania
- Died: September 26, 2001 (aged 96)
- Label: Zelda Wynn

Zelda Barbour Wynn Valdes (June 28, 1905 – September 26, 2001) was an American fashion designer.

== Biography ==
Zelda Christian Barbour was born in Chambersburg, Pennsylvania, and grew up in Charlotte, North Carolina. She trained as a classical pianist at the Catholic Conservatory of Music. In the early 1920s, Valdes worked in the tailoring shop of her uncle in White Plains, New York, and as a stock girl at a high-end boutique. Eventually, she worked her way up to selling and making alterations, becoming the shop's first black sales clerk and tailor. Looking back, Valdes said "It wasn't a pleasant time, but the idea was to see what I could do." Despite the struggles she experienced in her early experiences in the alteration industry, Valdes and her sister, Chez Valdes, opened the first African American owned Manhattan boutique in 1948.

== Early life ==
Zelda Wynn Valdés was the eldest of seven children and she grew up in Chambersburg, Pennsylvania. Her father, James W. Barbour worked as a cook on the Pennsylvania railroad, while her mother, Blanche M. Barbour, was a homemaker.

In 1923, she graduated from Chambersburg High School in which she studied business while also attending a Catholic music school in Pennsylvania, where she learned to play the piano. She also learned how to sew from her mother, grandmother, and her grandmother's dressmaker at the time. She would go onto utilize her sewing skills at her uncle's tailoring shop in White Plans, New York in 1923.

== Career ==
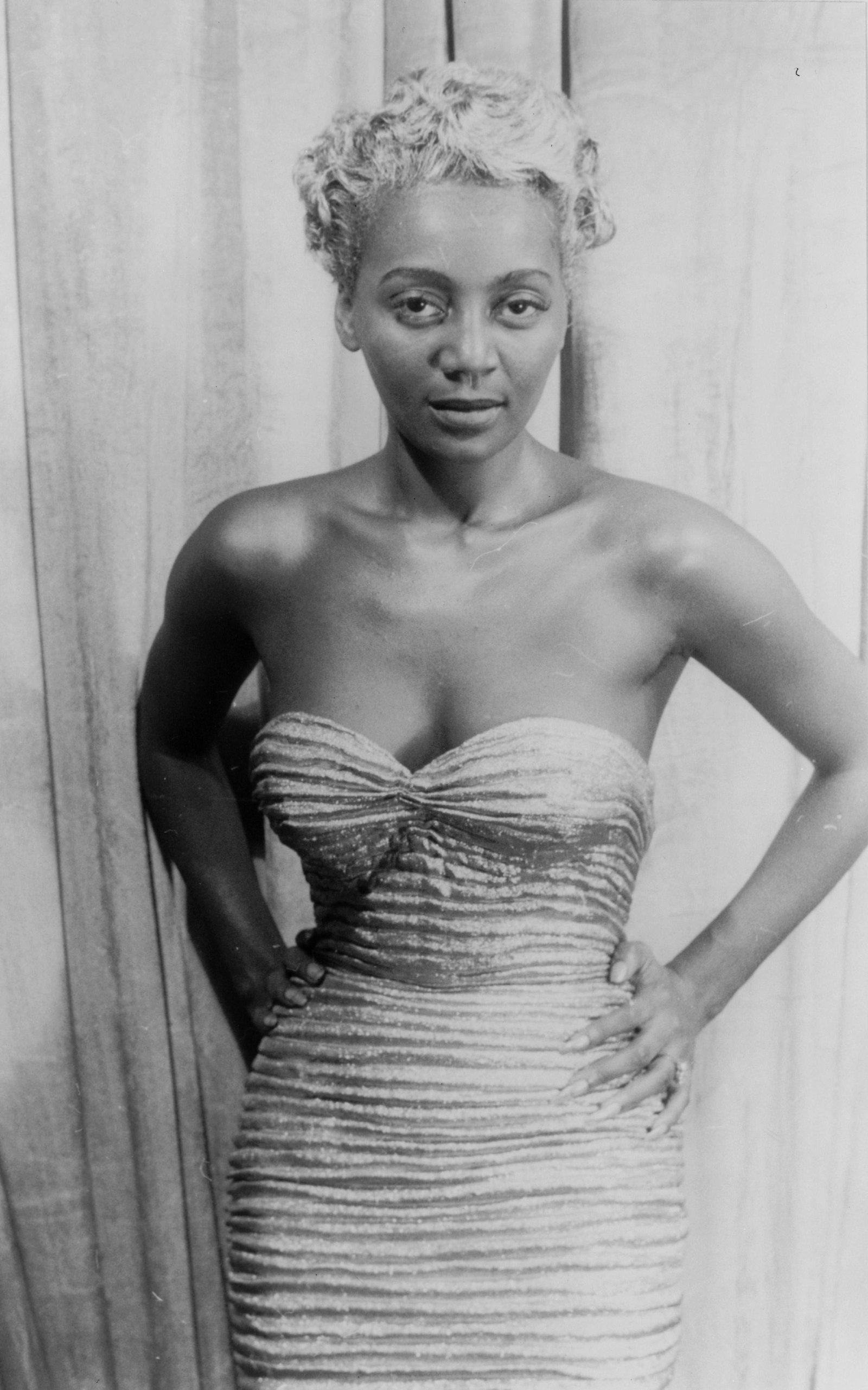
Joyce Bryant wearing signature look from Zelda Valdes (Image by Carl Van Vechten)

Beginning in 1935, she had her own dressmaking business in White Plains, New York. She eventually oversaw ladies alterations, and developed her own dressmaking clientele. In 1948, Valdes opened "Zelda Wynn," her design and dressmaking studio, on Broadway (in what is now Washington Heights on Broadway and West 158th Street). Valdes said that her shop was the first black-owned business on Broadway. She sold her dresses to movie star Dorothy Dandridge, opera diva Jessye Norman, and singer Gladys Knight. Valdes also dressed the entire bridal party for the 1948 wedding of Marie Ellington, aka Maria Cole and Nat King Cole. Additional celebrity clients included Josephine Baker, Mae West, Ella Fitzgerald, Eartha Kitt, and Marian Anderson, Constance Bennett, Diahann Carroll, Ruby Dee, Aretha Franklin, and Gladys Knight. Her designing relationship with Fitzgerald was mostly long-distance - she told The New York Times in 1994 that she only fitted Fitzgerald once in 12 years, and did most of her designing for her based on her imagination. Valdes also created a new sexier image for singer Joyce Bryant who LIFE Magazine dubbed "the Black Marilyn Monroe." Wynn's contribution to Bryant's rebranding was integral to the success of the singer's career. Whereas before Bryant was known to wear 'sweet' dresses to accompany her 'sweet' songs, Zelda's suggestion to dress Bryant in more formfitting gowns that complimented her curves, helped in establishing Bryant as a global talent.

Her extensive clientele coupled to her involvement as president of the National Association of Fashion and Accessory Designers in 1949, bolstered her career. The organization, jointly founded by Mary McLeod Bethune, was made up of Black designers who were dedicated to providing opportunities for networking, professional development, and funding young designers and their endeavors. There was also a focus on bridging the divide between the black fashion world and the mainstream fashion industry.

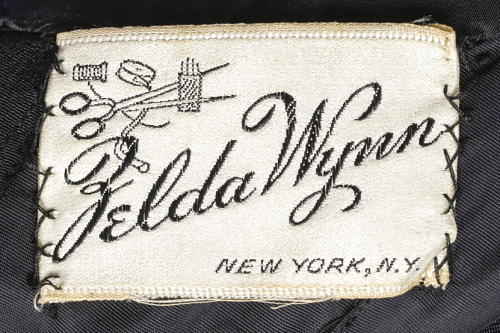
Label in dress (c.1940s) worn by Ella Fitzgerald.

In the 1950s, she moved "Chez Zelda" to 151 57th Street in Midtown. She had a staff of nine dressmakers and charged almost $1,000 per couture gown. Overall, Wynn was widely known to create dresses that accentuated curves whilst delivering a look of powerful femininity. She famously claimed, "I just had a God- given talent for making people beautiful" in an interview with the New York Times in 1994.

=== Activism through fashion ===
Zelda Wynn Valdes was known to consistently contribute to social work and community building. Beginning in the 1960s. She directed the Fashion and Design Workshop of the Harlem Youth Opportunities Unlimited and Associated Community Teams (HARYOU-ACT). Valdes taught costume designing skills and facilitated fabric donations to the student workshops. Additionally, she was one of the founders of the National Association of Fashion Accessory Designers, an industry group intended to promote black talent in the fashion industry. This group was established with the sponsorship of the National Council of Negro Women. Continuing in her dedication to her community, she notably participated in charity fashion shows for Abyssinian Baptist Church, the Salvation Army, New York Baptist Home for the Aged, and Jack and Jill.

Her role as a communal contributor to the African American society also extended to her role in the Civil Rights movement. Wynn's fashion career was inherently connected to the Civil Right movement, as her success came at a time during racial segregation in the United States. In effect, there was a segregation in the fashion industry separating the industry created by black designers and the mainstream fashion world. However through her achievement and success in the fashion world, she was conducive to establishing a positive black identity.

=== Later career ===
In 1970, Arthur Mitchell asked Valdes to design costumes for his new company, the Dance Theatre of Harlem. She closed her business in 1989, but continued to work with the Dance Theatre of Harlem. During her time there, she worked on a total of 82 ballet productions in over 22 countries until she died in 2001.
