= Coldbrook Farm =

Historic house in Pennsylvania, United States

- U.S. National Register of Historic Places
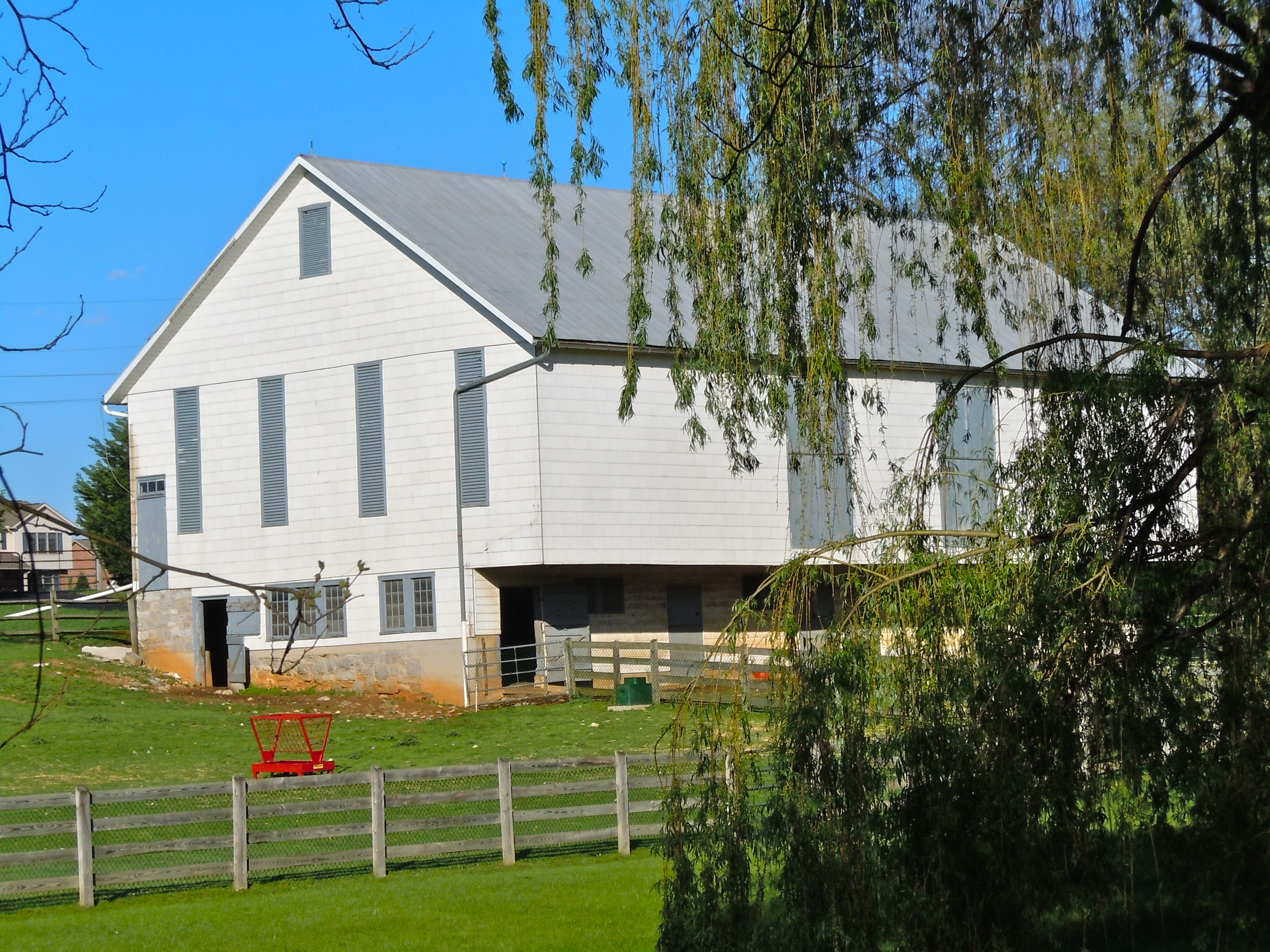
- Coldbrook Farm, April 2011

- Location within Pennsylvania Location within the United States
- Location: 955 Spring Ln., Chambersburg, Pennsylvania
- Coordinates: 39°56′07″N 77°38′32″W
- Area: 10.8 acres (4.4 ha)
- Architectural style: Georgian, Colonial Revival
- NRHP reference No.: 96000321
- Added to NRHP: March 28, 1996

Coldbrook Farm is a historic home and farm located at Chambersburg in Franklin County, Pennsylvania, United States. The property has a large stone house, a frame bank barn, and a stone spring house. All were built about 1800. The house consists of a two-story, five-bay, central section in the Georgian style, flanked by two-story, three-bay recessed wings. Colonial Revival-style modifications, such as roof dormers and colonnade were added in the late-19th century.

It was listed on the National Register of Historic Places in 1996.
