= Chambersburg Area School District =

School district in Pennsylvania

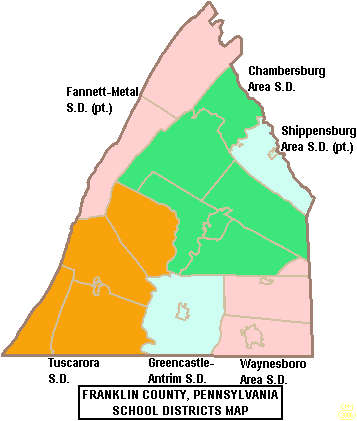

Address
- 435 Stanley Ave Chambersburg, Franklin County, Pennsylvania, 17201-3405; United States

District information
- Type: Public

Other information
- Website: http://www.casdonline.org

The Chambersburg Area School District is a public school district located in Franklin County, Pennsylvania. The district encompasses approximately 250 square miles, including the borough of Chambersburg, plus the townships of Hamilton, Greene, Lurgan, and Letterkenny, and a portion of Guilford Township. It operates the following schools: Andrew Buchanan Elementary, Guilford Hills Elementary, South Hamilton Elementary, Benjamin Chambers Elementary, Hamilton Heights Elementary, Thaddeus Stevens Elementary, Lurgan Elementary, Falling Spring Elementary, Grandview Elementary, Scotland Elementary, Marion Elementary, Fayetteville Elementary, New Franklin Elementary, Chambersburg Area Middle School South, Chambersburg Area Middle School North, Chambersburg Area Senior High School and the Chambersburg CareerTech Career Magnet School. In 2009, the US Census Bureau reported that the district' serves a resident population of 56,283 residents had a per capita incomes of $20,572, while the districts' median family income was $47,354 a year.

== Extracurriculars ==
The Chambersburg Area School District offers a variety of clubs, activities and sport.

=== Sports ===
The District funds:

Boys

- Baseball - AAAA
- Basketball- AAAA
- Cross Country - AAA
- Football - AAAA
- Golf - AAA
- Lacrosse - AAAA
- Soccer - AAA
- Swimming and Diving - AAA
- Tennis - AAA
- Track and Field - AAA
- Volleyball - AAA
- Wrestling - AAA

Girls

- Basketball - AAAA
- Cross Country - AAA
- Field Hockey - AAA
- Golf - AAA
- Gymnastics - AAAA
- Soccer (Fall) - AAA
- Softball - AAA
- Swimming and Diving - AAA
- Girls' Tennis - AAA
- Track and Field - AAA
- Volleyball - AAA
- Lacrosse - AAA

Middle School Sports:

Boys

- Basketball
- Cross Country
- Football
- Soccer
- Track and Field
- Wrestling

Girls

- Basketball
- Cross Country
- Field Hockey
- Soccer (Fall)
- Track and Field
- Volleyball

According to PIAA directory July 2012
