= Waynesboro Area School District =

School district in Pennsylvania

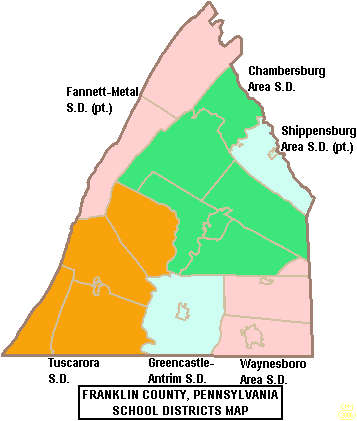

Address
- 210 Clayton Avenue Waynesboro, Franklin County, Pennsylvania, 17268-2066; United States

District information
- Type: Public

Other information
- Website: http://www.wasd.k12.pa.us/

The Waynesboro Area School District is a midsized, suburban public school district located in Franklin County, Pennsylvania. The district is one of the 500 public school districts of Pennsylvania. It encompasses the boroughs of Waynesboro and Mont Alto, as well as all of Washington Township and Quincy Township, and a portion of Guilford Township. Waynesboro Area School District encompasses approximately 93 square miles (240 km^{2}). According to 2000 federal census data, it serves a resident population of 28,376. By 2010, the district's population increased to 32,386 people. In 2009, the district residents' per capita income was $18,503, while the median family income was $46,584. In the Commonwealth, the median family income was $49,501 and the United States median family income was $49,445, in 2010.

The district operates four elementary schools: Fairview Avenue Elementary School, Hooverville Elementary School, Mowery Elementary School, and Summitview Elementary School. It also operates: Waynesboro Area Middle School, and Waynesboro Area Senior High School. High school students may choose to attend Franklin County Career and Technology Center for training in the construction and mechanical trades.

Waynesboro Area School District is served by the Lincoln Intermediate Unit IU12 which offers a variety of services, including assistance in developing K–12 curriculum that is mapped and aligned with the Pennsylvania Academic Standards, shared services, a group purchasing program and a wide variety of special education and special needs services. Students may choose to attend Franklin Virtual Academy which is an online education program operated by a cooperative agreement of local Franklin County public school districts.

== Sports ==
The district funds:

Boys

- Baseball - AAAA
- Basketball- AAAA
- Cross country - AAA
- Football - AAAA
- Golf - AAA
- Soccer - AAA
- Track and field - AAA
- Wrestling - AAA

Girls

- Basketball - AAAA
- Cross country - AAA
- Field hockey - AAA
- Golf - AAA
- Gymnastics - AAAA
- Soccer - AAA
- Softball - AAA
- Track and field - AAA
- Volleyball - AAA

Middle school sports

Boys

- Basketball
- Football
- Soccer
- Track and field
- Wrestling

Girls

- Basketball
- Field hockey
- Soccer
- Track and field
- Volleyball

According to PIAA directory July 2013
