= Waynesboro Area Senior High School =

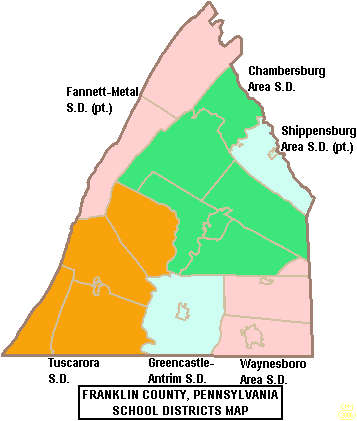

Location
- 550 East Second Street; Waynesboro, Franklin County, Pennsylvania 17268; United States; 39.7489°N 77.5713°W

Information
- Type: Public
- School board: WASD
- Faculty: 87 teachers
- Grades: 9–12
- Enrollment: 1,272 pupils (2013)
- Language: English
- Colors: Blue & Gold
- Mascot: Indian
- Feeder schools: Waynesboro Area Middle School
- Website: www.wasd.k12.pa.us/o/washs

The Waynesboro Area Senior High School is a midsized, suburban public high school located in Franklin County, Pennsylvania. It is the sole high school operated by the Waynesboro Area School District. It serves the boroughs of Waynesboro and Mont Alto, as well as all of Washington Township and Quincy Township, and a portion of Guilford Township. In 2013, enrollment was reported as 1,272 pupils in 9th through 12th grades. Waynesboro Area Senior High School employed 87 teachers. Per the PA Department of Education 1% of the teachers were rated "Non‐Highly Qualified" under the federal No Child Left Behind Act.

Students may choose to attend Franklin Virtual Academy which is an online education program operated by a cooperative agreement of local Franklin County public school districts. Additionally, students may choose to attend Franklin County Career and Technology Center for training in the construction, mechanical trades. web development and technology careers, culinary arts, landscaping, cosmetology, and allied health services.

== Extracurriculars ==
The Waynesboro Area School District offers a variety of clubs, activities and an extensive sports program.

=== Sports ===
The district funds:

==== Boys ====
- Baseball – AAAA
- Basketball- AAAA
- Cross country – AAA
- Diving – AAA
- Football – AAAA
- Golf – AAA
- Soccer – AAA
- Swimming – AAA
- Track and field – AAA
- Wrestling – AAA

==== Girls ====
- Basketball – AAAA
- Cross country – AAA
- Diving – AAA
- Field hockey – AAA
- Golf – AAA
- Gymnastics – AAAA
- Soccer – AAA
- Softball – AAA
- Swimming – AAA
- Track and field – AAA
- Volleyball – AAA
- Cheerleading – AAA
- Wrestling – AAA

==== Middle school sports ====
===== Boys =====
- Basketball
- Football
- Soccer
- Track and field
- Wrestling

===== Girls =====
- Basketball
- Field hockey
- Soccer
- Track and field
- Volleyball
- Wrestling

According to PIAA directory July 2013

== Notable alumni ==
- Lil Skies, rapper
- Chad Reichard, State Representative
