= Greencastle-Antrim School District =

School district in Pennsylvania

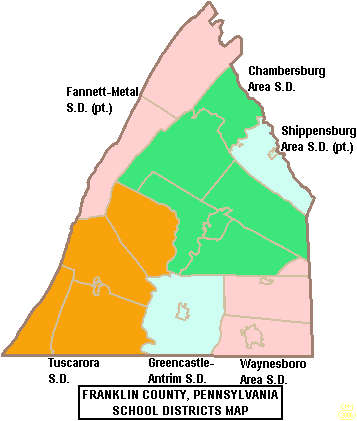

Address
- 500 E. Leitersburg St Greencastle, Franklin County PA-, Pennsylvania, 17225; United States

District information
- Type: Public

Other information
- Website: www.gcasd.org

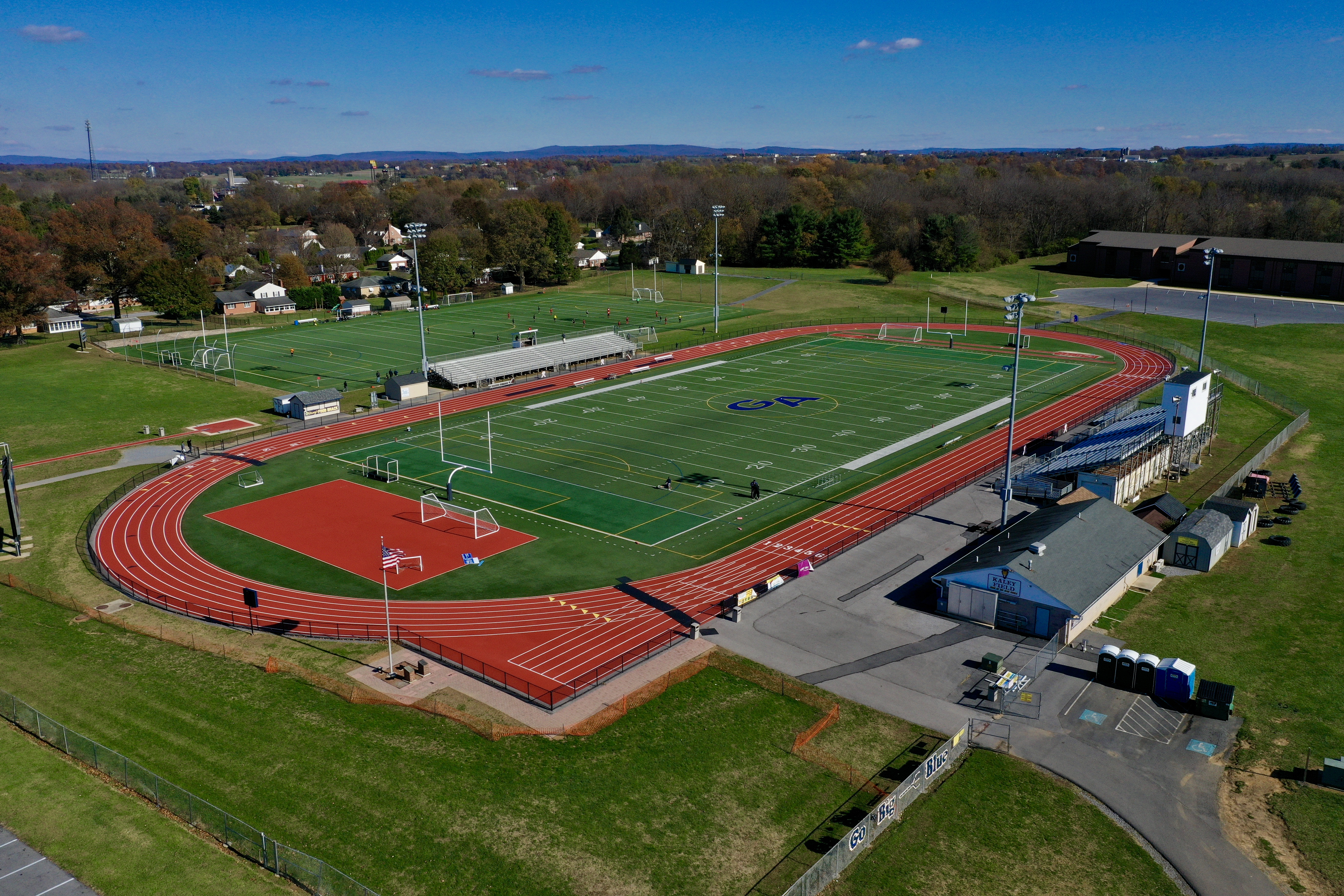
Kaley Field - Home of the Blue Devils

The Greencastle-Antrim School District is a medium, rural, public school district located in Franklin County, Pennsylvania. It encompasses the borough of Greencastle and the surrounding Antrim Township. Greencastle-Antrim School District encompasses approximately 93 square miles (240 km^{2}). According to 2000 federal census data, it served a resident population of 16,226 people. By 2010, the District's population increased to 18,916 people. According to the US Census Bureau, in 2009, the District residents' per capita income was $19,566, while the median family income was $49,318. In the Commonwealth, the median family income was $49,501 and the United States median family income was $49,445, in 2010.

Greencastle-Antrim School District operates five schools: Greencastle-Antrim Primary School (K-2), Greencastle-Antrim Elementary School (3-5), Greencastle-Antrim Middle School (6-8), and Greencastle-Antrim High School (9-12). Alternatively, students may choose to attend Franklin Virtual Academy which is an online education program operated by a cooperative agreement of Franklin County public school districts. Greencastle-Antrim High School students may also choose to attend Franklin County Career and Technology Center for training in the construction and mechanical trades. The Lincoln Intermediate Unit IU12 provides the District with a wide variety of services like specialized education for disabled students and hearing, speech and visual disability services and professional development for staff and faculty. Greencastle-Antrim School District is affiliated with six neighboring districts in a Learning Center for severely handicapped children.

In 1966, the District purchased the Stover–Winger Farm.

== Governance ==
The district created an assistant superintendent position in 2024.

== Facilities ==
The district is building an Academy for Character Education (ACE) Building, for a division to give support for at risk students, with scheduled completion in 2024. Prior to that time, the program is in temporary buildings.

== Curriculum ==
In 2024 the district began requiring the Class of 2028 (graduating from high school in 2028) and subsequent classes to take financial literacy content.

== Extracurriculars ==
The Greencastle-Antim School District offers a wide variety of activities, clubs and an extensive sports program. Sports are provided under the Pennsylvania Interscholastic Athletic Association and the Mid Penn Conference.

=== Sports ===
The District funds:

Boys

- Baseball - AAAAA
- Basketball- AAAAA
- Cross Country - AAA
- Football - AAAAA
- Golf - AAA
- Soccer - AAA
- Track and Field - AAA
- Wrestling - AAA

Girls

- Basketball - AAAAA
- Cross Country - AAA
- Field Hockey - AA
- Golf
- Soccer (Fall) - AAA
- Softball - AAAAA
- Track and Field - AAA
- Volleyball - AAA

Junior high school sports

Boys

- Basketball
- Cross Country
- Football
- Track and Field
- Wrestling

Girls

- Basketball
- Cross Country
- Field Hockey
- Track and Field
- Volleyball

According to PIAA directory July 2012
