= Fannett-Metal School District =

School district in Pennsylvania

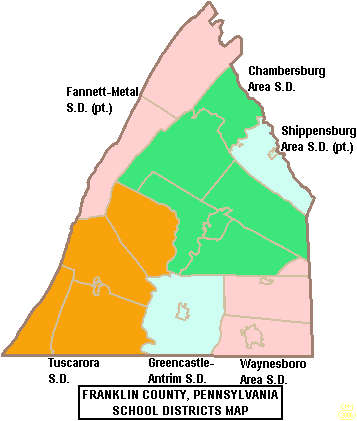

Address
- 14823 Path Valley Rd. Willow Hill, Franklin County and Perry County, Pennsylvania, 17271; United States

District information
- Type: Public

Other information
- Website: Fannett-Metal School District

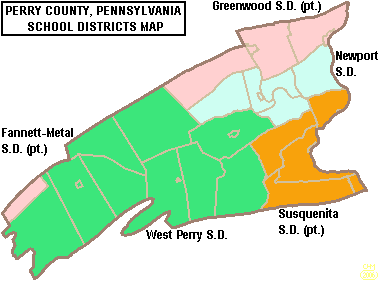
Fannet-Metal School District region in Perry County

The Fannett-Metal School District is a diminutive, rural, public school district that serves Fannett and Metal townships in Franklin County, as well as a small portion of Toboyne Township in Perry County, Pennsylvania. It encompasses approximately 128 square miles (330 km^{2}). According to 2000 federal census data, it served a resident population of 4,091. According to 2010 local census data, it serves a resident population of 4,426. The educational attainment levels for the school district population (25 years old and over) were 72% high school graduates and 9.2% college graduates. In 2009, the district residents’ per capita income was $15,304, while the median family income was $38,165. In the Commonwealth, the median family income was $49,501 and the United States median family income was $49,445, in 2010. By 2013, the median household income in the United States rose to $52,100. In Franklin County the median household income was $51,035.

== Schools ==
There are three schools, which are all located on the same campus.

- Fannett-Metal Elementary School (Grades K–5)
- Fannett-Metal Middle School (Grades 6–8)
- Fannett-Metal High School (Grades 9–12)

Students may choose to attend Franklin Virtual Academy which is an online education program operated by a cooperative agreement of local Franklin County public school districts.

== Extracurriculars ==
The Fannett-Metal School District offers a variety of clubs, activities and interscholastic athletics. Varsity and junior varsity athletic activities are under the Pennsylvania Interscholastic Athletics Association.

=== Athletics ===
Boys

- Baseball - Class A
- Basketball - Class A
- Soccer - Class A
- Track and field - AA

Girls

- Basketball - A
- Softball - Class A
- Track and field - AA
- Volleyball - Class A

According to PIAA directory July 2012

== Intermediate Unit ==
Lincoln Intermediate Unit (IU#12) region includes: Adams County, Franklin County and York County. The agency provides Fannett-Metal Schools, charter schools located in Franklin County, the district's home schooled students and area private schools many services, including: Special education services, combined purchasing, and instructional technology services. It runs Summer Academy which offers both art and academic strands designed to meet the individual needs of gifted, talented and high achieving students. Additional services include: Curriculum Mapping, Professional Development for school employees, Adult Education, Nonpublic School Services, Business Services, Migrant & ESL (English as a Second Language), Instructional Services, Special Education, Management Services, and Technology Services. The IU offers preemployment screening, including fingerprinting, for prospective public school employees. It also provides a GED program to adults who want to earn a high school diploma and literacy programs. The Lincoln Intermediate Unit is governed by a 13-member board of directors, each a member of a local school board from the 25 school districts. Board members are elected by school directors of all 25 school districts for three-year terms that begin July 1. There are 29 intermediate units in Pennsylvania. They are funded by school districts, state and federal program specific funding and grants. IUs do not have the power to tax.
