= List of Indiana University of Pennsylvania buildings =

Indiana University of Pennsylvania, one of two the largest university of the Pennsylvania State System of Higher Education, first opened in 1875 as the Indiana Normal School. Upon opening, John Sutton Hall was the school's only building, housing dormitories for all 225 students. Sutton Hall additionally held classroom and office space, an infirmary, dining hall, and gymnasium.

== Timeline ==
The earliest building currently owned by the university is Breezedale, which served as a private residence from its construction in 1868 until it was purchased by the university in 1947. The following is a timeline of the university's buildings. Those in italics no longer exist.

- Breezedale, 1868 (purchased by the university in 1947)
- John Sutton Hall, 1875
- Wilson Hall, 1894
- Clark Hall, 1894 (destroyed by fire in 1905)
- Expansion of John Sutton Hall, 1903 (additions removed in 1975)
- Leonard Hall, 1903 (destroyed by fire in 1952)
- Thomas Sutton Hall, 1903 (demolished in 1975)
- Clark Hall, 1906
- Uhler Hall, c. 1920 (purchased by the university in 1963)
- Waller Hall, 1927
- McElhaney Hall, 1931
- Fisher Auditorium, 1939
- Keith Hall, 1939 (demolished in 2016)
- Military Hall, 1947 (later the Administrative Annex, demolished in 2006)
- Whitmyre Hall, 1951
- Leonard Hall, 1953 (demolished in 2017)
- Cogswell Hall, 1960
- Langham Hall, 1960
- Wahr Hall, 1960 (demolished in 2006)
- Walsh Hall, 1960 (demolished in 2020)
- Hadley Union Building, 1961 (expanded in 1962, 1966, 1972, and 1985)
- Stabley Library, 1961
- Mack Hall, 1963 (demolished in 2007)
- Stewart Hall, 1963 (demolished in 2007)
- Turnbull Hall, 1963 (demolished in 2007)
- Ackerman Hall, 1964
- Gordon Hall, 1964 (demolished in 2007)
- Elkin Hall, 1965
- Foster Hall, 1965
- Weyandt Hall, 1966 (demolished in 2024)
- Memorial Field House, 1966
- Wallace Hall (demolished in 2009)
- Esch Hall (demolished in 2009)
- Eicher Hall, 1970
- Pierce Hall, 1970
- Lawrence Hall, 1971 (demolished in 2009)
- Scranton Hall, 1971 (demolished in 2009)
- Shafer Hall, 1971 (demolished in 2009)
- Folger Hall, 1972
- Sprowls Hall, 1972
- Stright Hall, c.1976
- Zink Hall, 1976
- Stapleton Library, 1981 (connected to Stabley Library)
- S.W. Jack Cogeneration Plant, 1988
- Delaney Hall, 2007
- Putt Hall, 2007
- Northern Suites, 2008
- Ruddock Hall, 2008
- Suites on Maple East, 2008
- Suites on Pratt, 2009
- Wallwork Hall, 2009
- Stephenson Hall, 2010
- Jane E. Leonard Hall, 2015
- North Dining Hall, 2017
- Kopchick Hall, 2024

== Administrative buildings ==
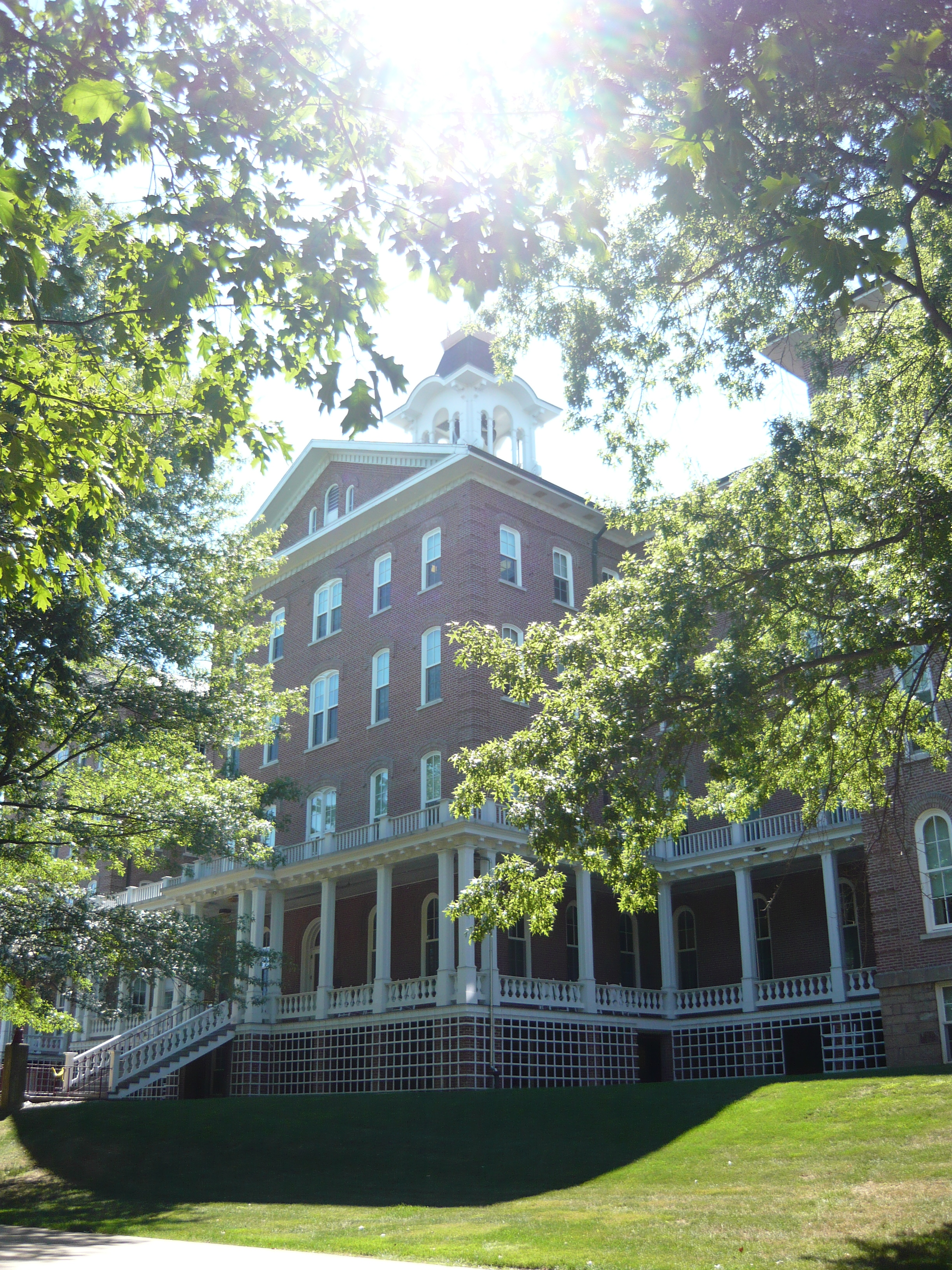
Sutton Hall

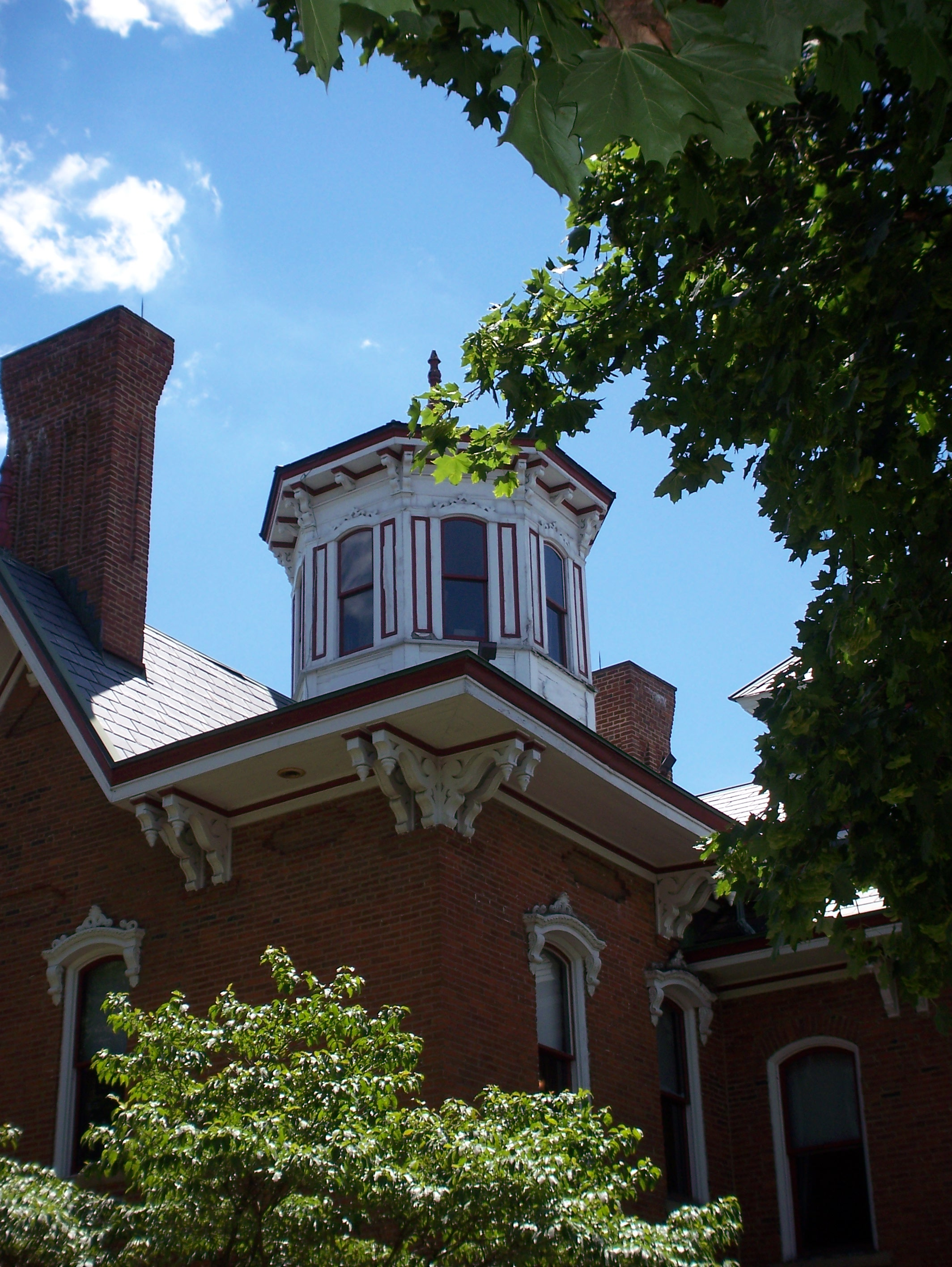
Breezedale

=== Sutton Hall ===
John Sutton Hall was constructed between 1873 and 1875 to house the Indiana Normal School, a school to train women to become teachers. The building was designed by James W. Drum, who also designed the 1869 Indiana County Courthouse, the Jefferson County Courthouse, and the St. Bernard's Roman Catholic Church in Indiana. Originally Sutton Hall was the school's only building and contained classrooms and dormitories

In the 1974 university officials decided to demolish the building because upkeep costs were too high. However, an effort to save the building eventually led it to be added to the National Register of Historic Places in 1975, and the demolish decision was overturned.

Today Sutton Hall serves as the administrative center of the university, housing the Office of the President, and various administrative and academic department offices.

=== Breezedale ===
Breezedale was constructed in 1868 and served as a private residence for James Sutton, brother of university founder John Sutton, and his wife Sara. The house sat on a 7-acre property near where John constructed a building to house the normal school when it opened in 1875. It was designed in the popular Italianate style. Mrs. Sutton took an interest in decorating the interior, purchasing foreign goods including French Louis Quinze chairs, a white Italian marble statue, and a portrait of herself done in Germany.

James Sutton died in 1870, and after Mrs. Sutton passed, the house was purchased by John Elkin in 1899. Elkin earned a law degree for the University of Michigan, served as a Pennsylvania state legislator, and was appointed as the state's attorney general in 1899. The residence was vacant following the death of Elkin's wife in 1934 until it was purchased by the adjacent university in 1947. Upon purchase by the university, Breezedale served as a men's dormitory, and was additionally used by the foreign language and art departments. Beginning in 1985, the university carried out renovations to Breezedale and in 1989 it reopened as the Alumni Center.

Breezedale was added to the National Register of Historic Places on March 29, 1979.

=== Clark Hall ===
An original Clark Hall was built in 1894 to serve as a men's dormitory for both faculty and students. The building was designed by the same architect as Wilson Hall, and both projects were funded by the same state appropriation. The original structure was destroyed by fire in 1905 and replaced by the current building in 1906. Significant renovations were performed in 1998, including the addition of a new wing. Today Clark Hall houses student administrative functions such as the registrar, bursar, and financial aid offices.

=== Eicher Hall ===
Eicher Hall was completed in 1969 and served as the maintenance buildings, housing various shops and garages. Then Eicher housed the American Language Institute, which provided intensive English as a Second Language courses, the University Writing Center, and the Criminal Justice Training academy. However, the building was demolished in 2024.

=== Pratt Hall ===
Pratt Hall opened in September 1969 and is named for Willis E. Pratt, who served as the university's president from 1948 to 1968. The building contained various offices, meeting rooms, and an auditorium. Pratt Hall is currently in the process of demolition.

=== University libraries ===
From opening until 1941, the university operated a small library in Sutton Hall. In 1941 the library was relocated to Wilson Hall, where it was housed until 1961. After the construction of the Rhodes R. Stabley Library in 1961, the university's collection was moved again. The Patrick J. Stapleton Library opened adjacent and connected to Stabley Library, and both buildings are utilized today to house over 800,000 volumes.

Upon opening in 1875 the university maintained a small library. While contained in Sutton Hall until 1941, the collection was relocated three different times. By the 1884–85 school year, the collection held 1,000 volumes. A literacy program by the YWCA that encouraged female students to read helped add to the collection. In 1902 the collection held 4,650 volumes, and had expanded to 6,803 in 1910.

In the 1930s, the library established a textbook collection, and shortly after the collection outgrew the space in Sutton Hall. In 1941 the library moved to Wilson Hall. Originally constructed in 1893, Wilson Hall had served as the model school until it was renovated to house the library collection. The new location had seating capacity for 225 students and room of 50,000 volumes.

Wilson Hall held the library until 1961, upon the opening of the Rhodes Stabley Library, the university's first exclusive library building. The new building could hold 130,000 volumes and opened in April 1961. In 1963 the university was selected for the Federal Depository Library Program, and began receiving federal government publications at no charge. By 1967 the library collection grew to include 126,000 volumes and 80,000 other items. It was ranked as the number twelve academic library in Pennsylvania.

The institution achieved university status and became the Indiana University of Pennsylvania in 1967, the library collection was expanded to accommodate developing master's and doctorate programs. With the collection outgrowing the capacity of the Stabley Library, plans were made to construct a new, larger building. Original plans intended to construct the new facility on the location of Sutton Hall which was scheduled to be demolished. When Sutton Hall was preserved, it was decided to construct the new library attached to the Stabley Library.

The Patrick J. Stapleton Library, named after Indiana native and member of the Pennsylvania State Senate Patrick J. Stapleton, Jr., opened in 1981. At that time, it was the largest academic library between the University of Pittsburgh's Hillman Library and Penn State's Pattee Library.

== Academic buildings ==
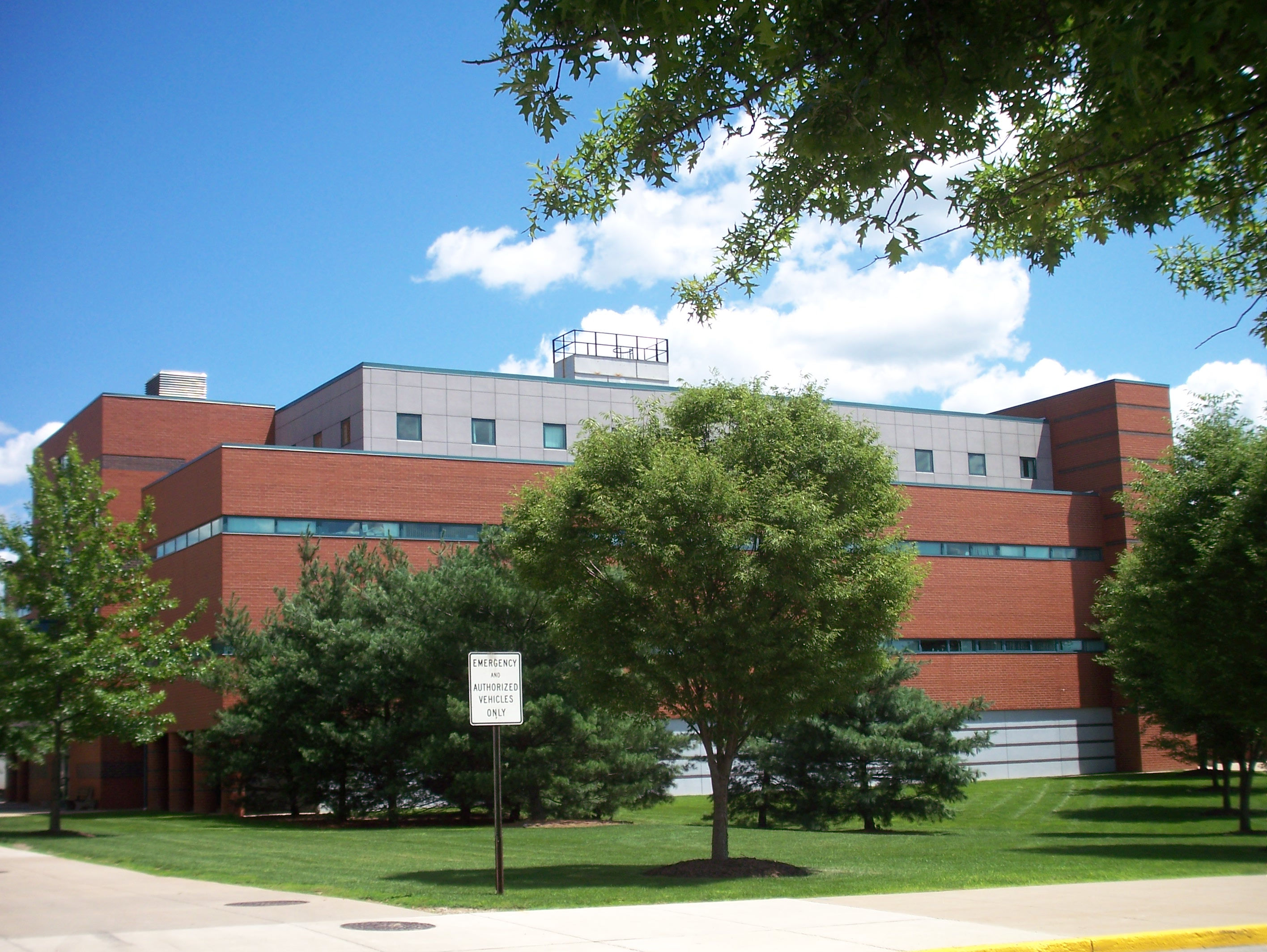
Eberly College of Business and Information Technology

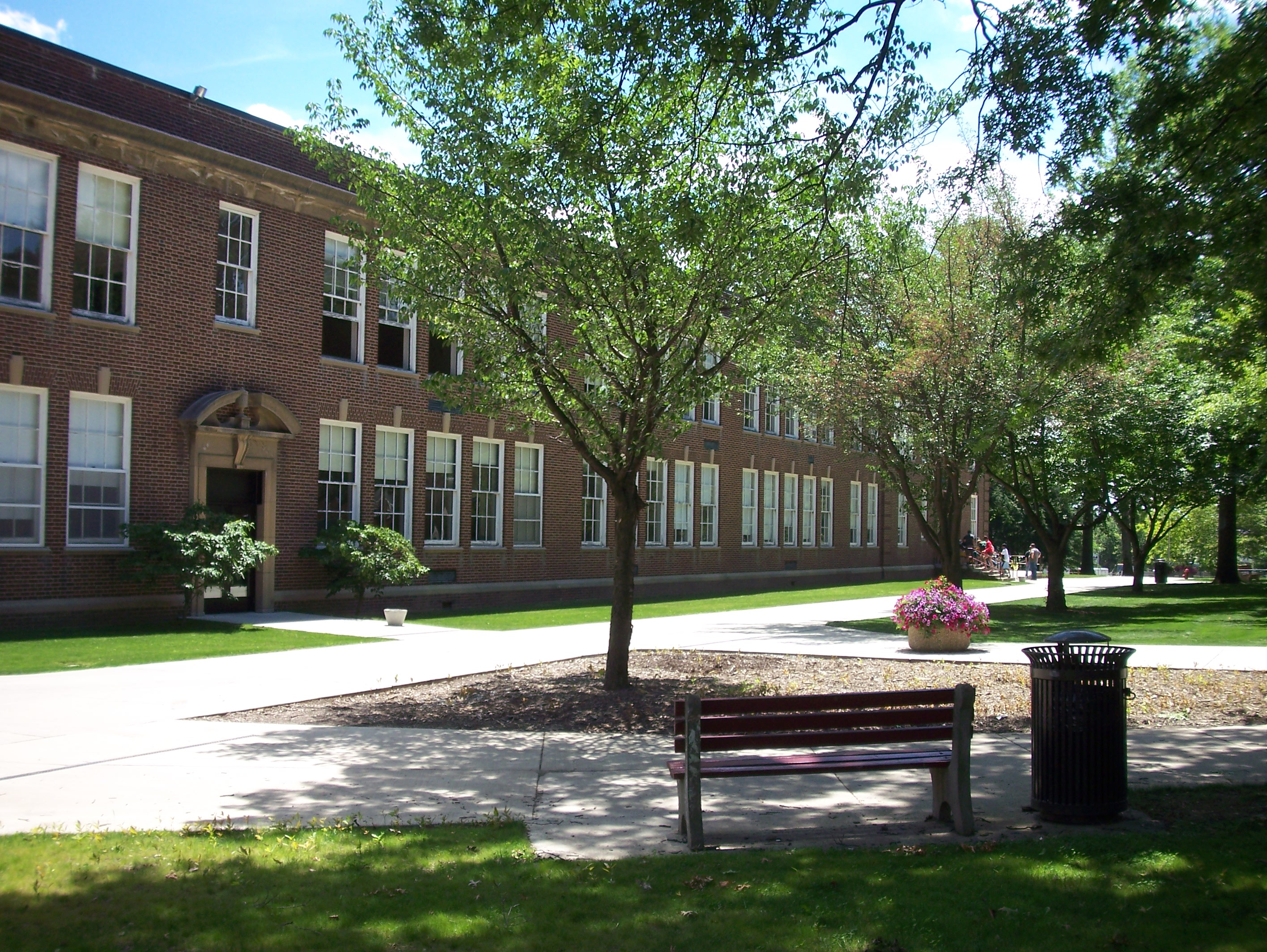
Keith Hall

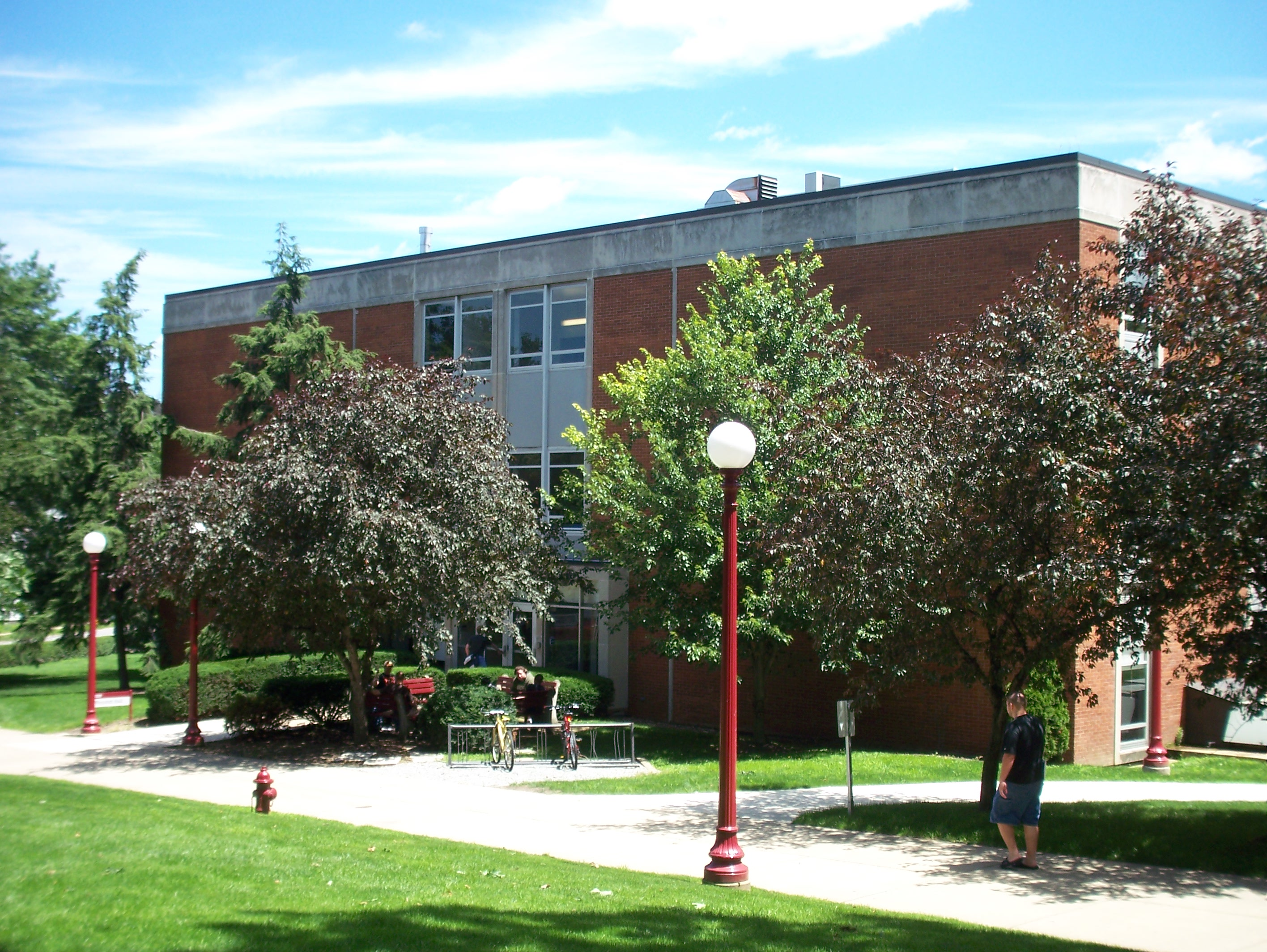
Weyandt Hall

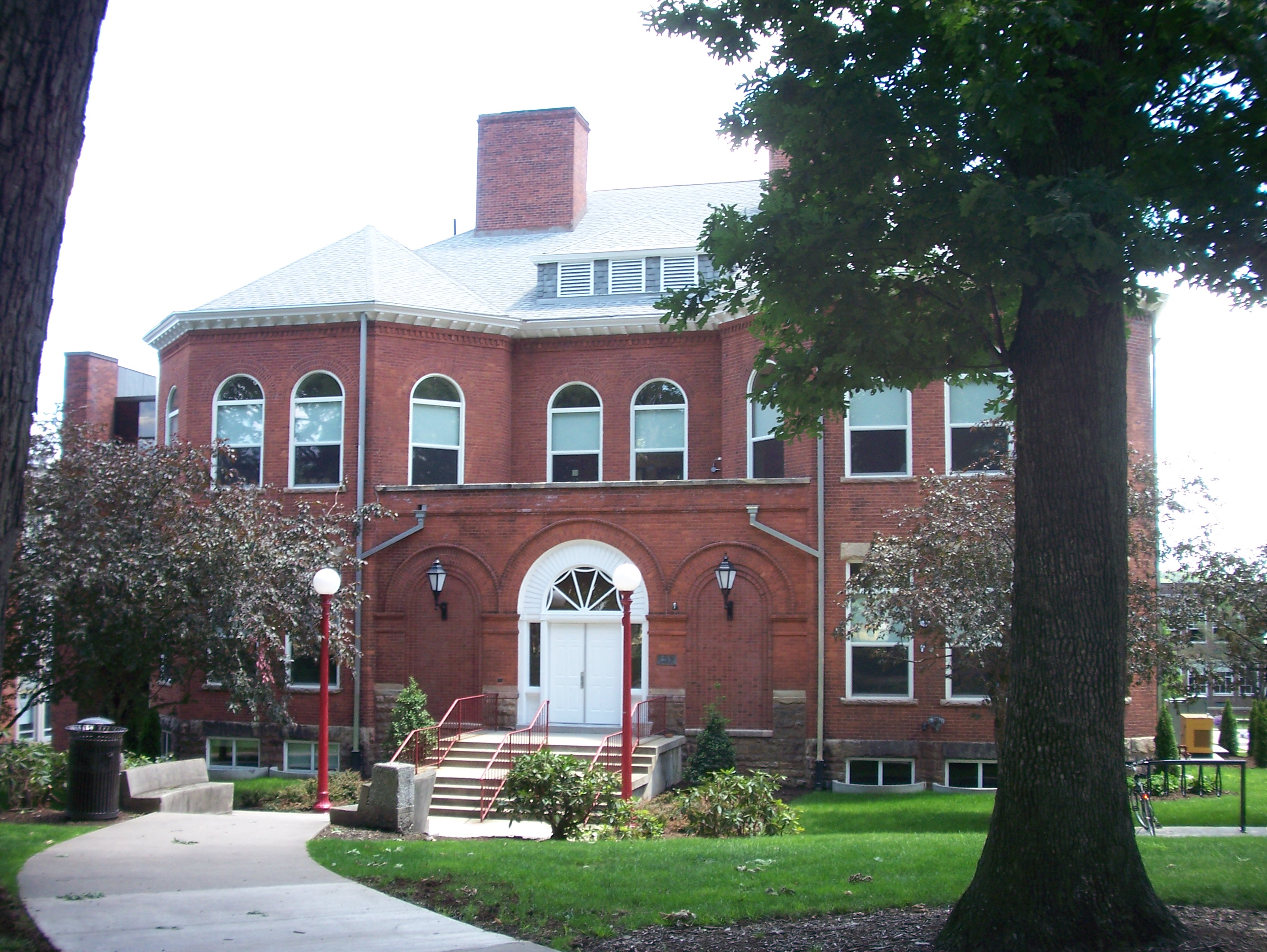
Wilson Hall

=== Cogswell Hall ===
Cogswell Hall houses the Music Department of the College of Fine Arts. The building first opened in 1960, but underwent a complete renovation between 2004 and 2006. When first constructed, Cogswell Hall was designed for 200 students and 20 faculty. Upon reopening in 2006 however, the department consisted of 343 undergraduate students, 15 graduate students, and a faculty of 34. The new facility contains the Orendorff Music Library, dedicated practice space for the jazz, percussion and choral ensembles, as well as the IUP Marching Band. There are 49 individual practice rooms, compared to 14 in the older building. The building also contains a recording studio dedicated to The Clarks, a Pittsburgh-based rock band whose members met while attending the university. The group played a benefit concert at Fisher Auditorium in 2006, raising $25,000 for the project.

=== Keith Hall ===
Keith Hall was built in 1938 to serve as a training school for the university's student teachers and opened in 1939 as the Keith Laboratory and Demonstration School, an elementary and junior high school for 400 students. Between 1969 and 1970, the laboratory school was converted to use for classrooms and offices and was utilized by the departments of history and political science. Keith Hall, along with Leonard Hall, have been replaced with a new facility for the College of Humanities and Social Sciences. Keith Hall was demolished in 2015, and a dining hall was built in its place.

=== Leonard Hall ===
An original Leonard Hall built in 1903 was destroyed by fire in 1952. The fire was among the top ten greatest property losses due to fire in the United States that year. A new building was constructed on the same site the following year. Leonard Hall which houses the departments of English and geography, was demolished following nearby Keith Hall, and the two were replaced by a new facility for the College of Humanities and Social Sciences, which is also named Leonard Hall.

=== McElhaney Hall ===
McElhaney Hall, adjacent to Sutton Hall on the Oak Grove, was built in 1931. A complete renovation was carried out between 1995 and 1997. Currently McElhaney Hall houses the departments of sociology and anthropology and the office of the College of Humanities and Social Sciences.

=== Uhler Hall ===
Uhler Hall was built circa 1920 as West Indiana Public School and later became Thaddeus Stevens Elementary School, both part of public school system in Indiana. The university purchased the building in 1963 and completed a renovation and addition in 1997.

=== Wilson Hall ===
Wilson Hall first opened in 1894 as the Model School, where the university's student teachers could gain experience. The school, divided into eight grades, housed approximately 275 students. Among the school's students was James Stewart, a prominent actor who grew up in Indiana. The building was dedicated to A.W. Wilson, the third president of the university's board of trustees in 1903. Upon construction of Keith Hall to serve as a new model school in the 1930s, Wilson Hall housed the library from 1941 to 1961. When the library collection was relocated, Wilson Hall underwent renovations to serve as classroom space for the College of Humanities and Social Sciences. Another renovation was carried out in 2007 for the building's current occupant, the Department of Criminology.

=== Other academic facilities ===
Other university buildings with academic functions include Ackerman Hall, Davis Hall, the Eberly College of Business building, Johnson Hall, Pierce Hall, Sprowls Hall, Stouffer Hall, Walsh Hall, Weyandt Hall and Zink Hall.

== Performance venues ==
=== Waller Hall ===
Waller Hall was constructed between 1926 and 1928 as the normal school's gymnasium. The first floor contained a primary and small gymnasium, while the lower level held a swimming pool. Waller Hall was the venue for the university's men's and women's basketball team and men's wrestling team until the Memorial Field House opened in the 1960s. Under a renovation project in 1989, the interior of Waller Hall was converted to serve as performance space for the Theater and Dance department, though the exterior remains the same as when it was first constructed. After the renovation, Waller contains a black box theater, a studio stage, classrooms, and studio and office space. Waller holds productions by the university's production company, Theater-by-the Grove, and student-written and directed productions under the Acorn Project.

=== Fisher Auditorium ===
Fisher Auditorium first opened in 1939 as a performance venue. It was named for John Stuchell Fisher, who graduated from the normal school in 1886. Fisher went on to serve 24 years on the school's board of trustees, and served as Governor of Pennsylvania from 1927 to 1931. Construction was partially funded by Works Progress Administration, a public works agency established during the New Deal. Upon opening, the auditorium could hold 1,600 people, more than the university had enrolled. Since its opening, Fisher Auditorium has served as a regional venue for speakers and performances. In its early years, Fisher hosted Eleanor Roosevelt, Leonard Bernstein, and Duke Ellington. Later performances included Bob Dylan, The Beach Boys, Ray Charles, George Carlin, and Billy Joel.

A major renovation was completed in 2008. The project upgraded performance amenities including new dressing rooms, backstage facilities, and offices. In addition to minor renovations in the auditorium, the project included a 20,500 square feet (1,900 m^{2}) addition connecting Fisher Auditorium with Waller Hall, home of the Department of Theater and Dance. The additional space serves as a central entrance and lobby area for both venues and combines to form the university's Performing Arts Center. Since 1989, Fisher Auditorium and the subsequent new spaces have been managed by the Lively Arts at IUP, an office of IUP's College of Fine Arts

== Residence halls ==
=== Residential suites ===
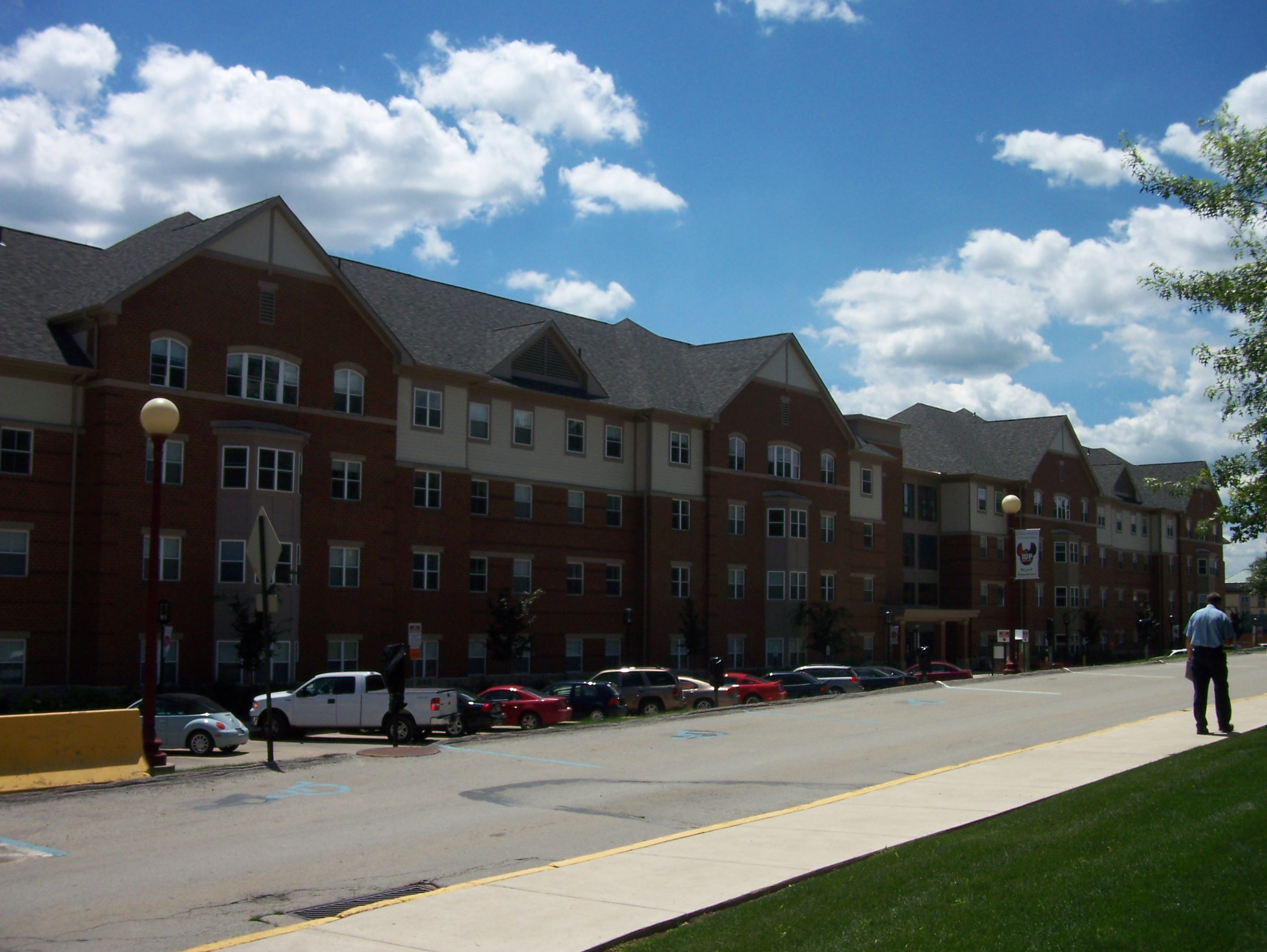
Delaney Hall, opened in 2007.

Between 2006 and 2010 the university carried out a $245 million project to replace old residential buildings. Eleven dormitory buildings were replaced with eight suite-style buildings. After completion, the new halls house approximately 3,500 of the 4,300 students living in university housing. In addition to student housing, the halls house various university offices. The construction project was the largest capital project of its kind in the country.

The work was divided into four phases over the five-year period, with new halls opening each year between 2007 and 2010. Upon opening, the halls were given generic names based on their location, and many were shortly renamed. Phase I was carried out between May 2006 and August 2007. During Phase I, Wahr Hall was demolished and replaced by Suites on Grant Lower and Upper, which were later renamed Delaney and Putt halls, respectively. Each building has beds for 367 students. Phase II was carried out between May 2007 and August 2008. Gordon, Langham, Mack, Stewart, and Turnbull halls were demolished. Northern Suites (373 students), Ruddock Hall (formerly Suites on Maple West, 365 students), and Suites on Maple East (356 students), opened for the Fall 2008 semester. Phase III work was done between May 2008 and August 2009. Esch and Wallace halls were demolished and replaced by Wallwork Hall (formerly Sutton Suites, 702 students). The apartment-style Campus Towers was demolished and replaced by Suites on Pratt (358 students). The final project, Phase IV, was completed for the Fall 2010 semester. Lawrence, Scranton and Shafer halls, known as the "Governors Quad", all built in 1971, were demolished and replaced by Stephenson Hall (formerly Crimson Suites, 596 students).

=== Traditional residence halls ===
Following the residential construction program, three dormitories and one apartment building remain. Whitmyre was built in 1950 in the Colonial Revival style. Upon opening in 1951 it housed Student Union activities until the union opened its own building nearby in 1961. Beginning in the 1960s Whitmyre served as a men's dormitory and additional contained recreational rooms, music practice rooms, the dean of men's office and apartment, and a dining facility. Between 1995 and 1999 the building underwent renovations to serve as classroom, office, and dormitory space for the Robert E. Cook Honors College. Whitmyre houses over two hundred Honors College students.

Elkin Hall is a five-story dormitory that first opened in 1965. It is named for John Pratt Elkin, whose private residence Breezedale is next to Elkin Hall. Elkin served on the university's board of trustees for 29 years and became the state's attorney general in 1899. Elkin Hall houses more than 300 male and female students. However the building was closed in the beginning of the 2015-2016 academic school year with plans to be renovated to house the Center for Student Life currently located in Pratt Hall and the African American Cultural Center currently located within Delaney Hall.

McCarthy Hall and University Towers sit adjacent to one another and next to the Suites on Pratt. The four-story McCarty Hall houses about 150 students in dormitory rooms. However, it was closed in 2013 with plans to be demolished in the summer of 2016. Plans are not yet finalized for what will replace the former residence hall. University Towers is the university's only apartment building and is open to upperclassmen and graduate students, with each room having a kitchen. The University Police are headquartered on the first floor of the building.

== Athletic facilities ==
University athletic facilities are roughly divided into two sections. On campus near the Eberly College of Business is George P. Miller Stadium, a 6,500 seat artificial turf stadium that serves as the venue for football, field hockey, and track & field. Miller Stadium first opened in the early 1960s. Before that, the teams played at Memorial Field, located along Maple Street at the site now occupied by Suites on Maple East and Ruddock Hall.

Adjacent to Miller Stadium is the Memorial Field House, which hosts men's and women's basketball, and women's volleyball, and additionally houses athletic department offices. The Field House was completed in 1966, and is dedicated to alumni who were killed while serving in the United States military. Prior to the constriction of the Field House, basketball was played in the Waller Hall gymnasium from the 1930s.

Also inside the Field House is the Pidgeon Natatorium, which is the home of the men's and women's swimming team. The South Campus Athletic Complex, which sits on 137 acres of former farmland acquired by the university in 1995, holds other sports venues including Owen Dougherty Field, home of the baseball team, Podbielski Field for the softball team, a soccer field and a rugby pitch.

Beginning in 1999, a construction project for a university convocation center was authorized by Pennsylvania Governor Tom Ridge. Construction began near Miller Stadium in late 2008 for the 150,000-square-foot (14,000 m^{2}) complex. The Kovalchick Convention and Athletic Complex, which was scheduled to open in 2011, will hold the Ed Fry Arena, which serve as the new home of the men's and women's basketball teams and women's volleyball, replacing the Memorial Field House as these teams primary venues.

== Other functions ==
=== Hadley Union Building ===
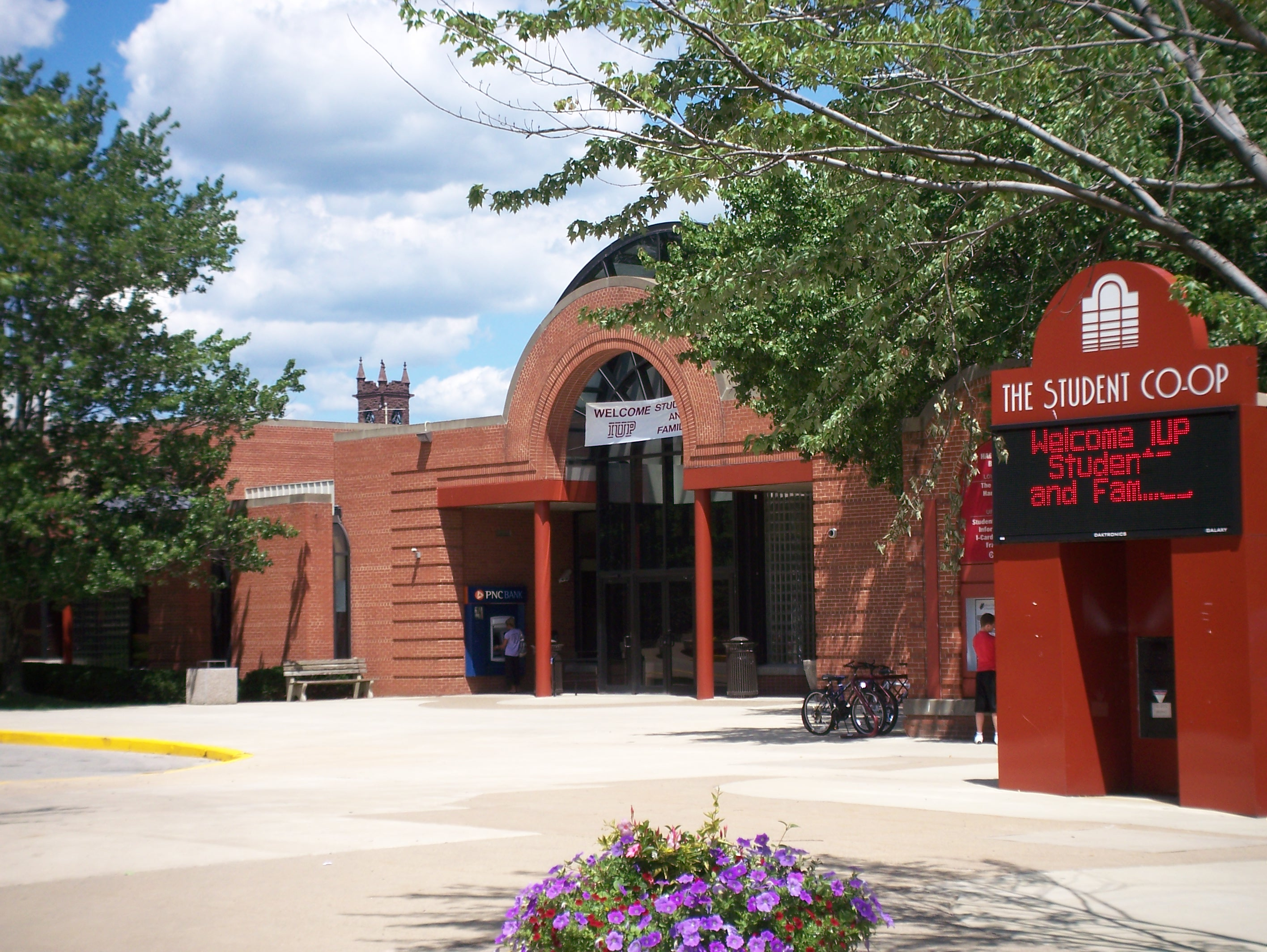
Hadley Union Building (HUB)

In the 1950s students indicated a desire for a student union building to serve as a center for student organizations and activities. Before this time, the university had two student activity groups: the Student Cooperative Association, which operated the College Store among other services, and the Student Lodge Association, Inc, which operated a nearby recreational park. The state was unwilling to contribute any funding towards any student center, so the College Student Union Association was formed, and the organization was able to borrow all of the funds needed for the construction of a new facility. Additionally, the two activity groups were merged to become the current Student Cooperative Association, Inc.

The original student union structure, sitting across the Pennsylvania Railroad tracks (later Pratt Drive) from Whitmyre Hall, was dedicated in 1961. Additions were made in 1962 and 1966. Additional land was acquired, facilitating the construction of a separate adjacent university book store. Another major renovation was carried out in 1972. In the mid-1980s, another major expansion and renovation was carried out, and in 1985 the facility was dedicated as the S. Trevor Hadley Union Building (commonly the HUB). Hadley was a freshman at the university when the Student Cooperative was first organized, and contributed greatly throughout his life to the university, its students and alumni.

Another renovation was completed in 2002. The $17 million project was designed by WTW Architects, the same firm that designed the original union building. Renovations included relocating the university bookstore, The Co-Op Store, to the older building, where it occupied the entire lower floor. The upper floor of the original building houses a PNC Bank branch and various conference rooms and offices. The original expansion was replaced by a newer facility. The new HUB, connected to the older facility by a second-floor bridge, contains a food court dining hall with six eateries. It also contains a fitness center, which when completed could hold up to 425 people. The second floor contains student organization offices such as The Penn student newspaper and the Student Government Association (SGA).

=== Dining facilities ===
Foster Hall opened in 1965 with dining hall facilities for over 1,000 students. It was dedicated to Dr. Charles Foster, who served as president of the institution from 1927 to 1936. Currently, the Foster "Residential Restaurant" is an all-you-can-eat cafeteria with a variety of menu options. Folger Hall opened as an additional dining hall in 1972. Olive K. Folger served as a dietician at the university from 1934 to 1950, and was referred to be students as "Ma Folger". Today Folger Hall is a food court style facility, with a Starbucks, Quiznos, and other small brands. The university also offers another food court dining facility in the Hadley Union Building, with various stands including Chick-fil-A.

=== S.W. Jack Cogeneration Plant ===
The university has had some sort of self-generating electricity on campus since 1913. That year, two steam driven electric generators were installed, and another was added in 1917. Beginning in October 1985, the university began construction of the S.W. Jack Cogeneration Plant to provide the university with heat and electricity. The plant uses four engines to produce electricity, as well as steam that is distributed to heat other buildings. When the plant opened in 1986, the university used just 20% of the energy produced. The rest was then returned to the public system in an agreement with Penelec, the local energy company.

== Works ==
Juliette, Ron; Dale E. Landon (1991). Indiana University of Pennsylvania, Our Homage and Our Love. Virginia Beach, Virginia: The Donning Company.

Pittsburgh Heritage & Landmarks Foundation (2009). Preservation Plan (pdf). Indiana University of Pennsylvania.

Undergraduate Catalog, 1971–1972. Indiana University of Pennsylvania. 1971.
