= Franklin County Courthouse (Pennsylvania) =

- U.S. National Register of Historic Places
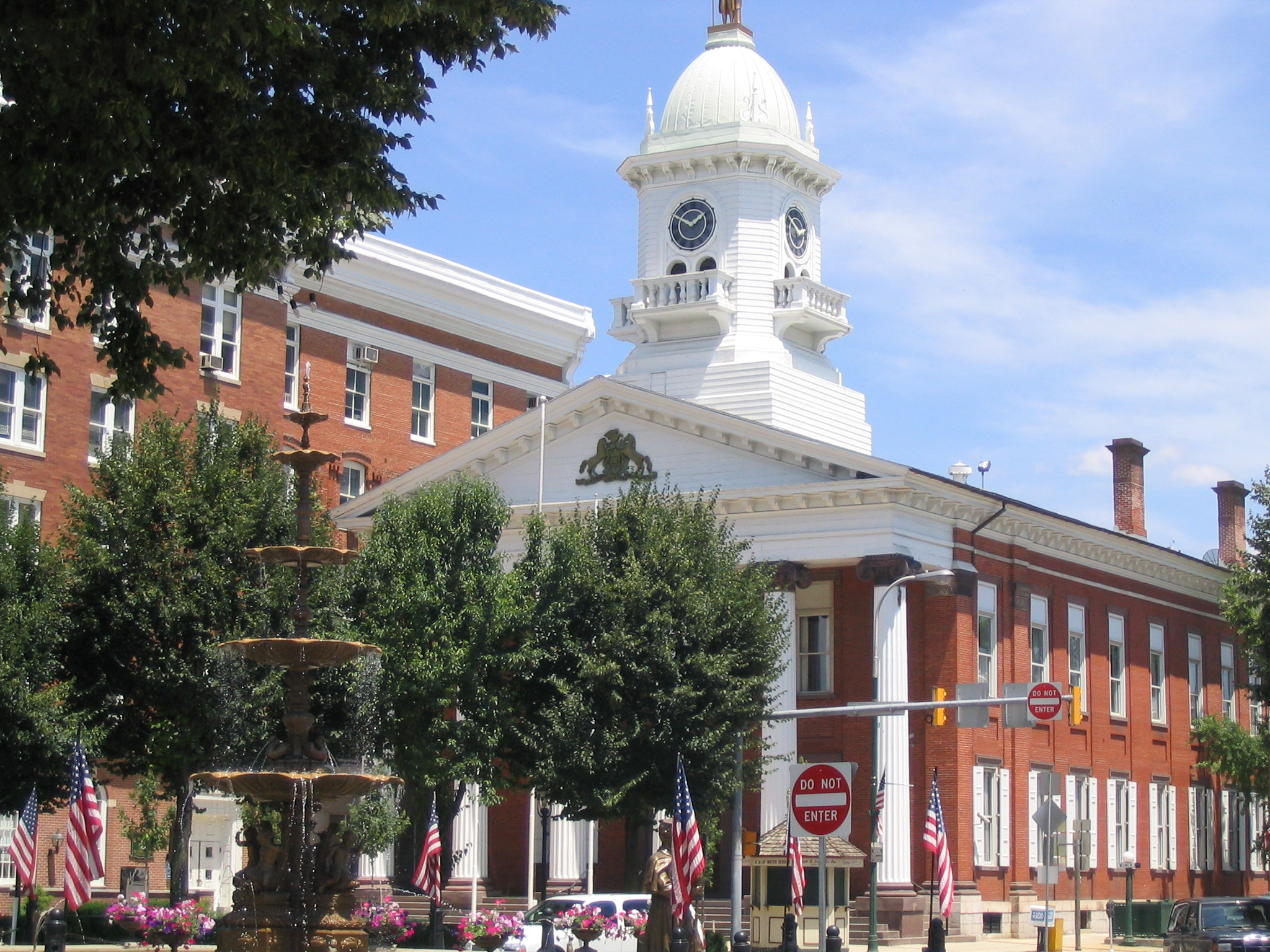
- Courthouse, on Memorial Square in Chambersburg

- Location within Pennsylvania Location within the United States
- Interactive map showing the location for Franklin County Courthouse
- Location: 1 North Main Street, Chambersburg, Pennsylvania
- Coordinates: 39°56′15″N 77°39′40″W
- Built: 1865
- Architect: S. Hutton; Samuel Seibert
- Architectural style: Greek Revival
- NRHP reference No.: 74001784
- Added to NRHP: January 18, 1974

The current Franklin County Courthouse in Chambersburg, Pennsylvania, built in 1865, is the third courthouse building on the site. The site was originally purchased from Colonel Benjamin Chambers in 1785.

Predecessor Franklin County Courthouse following the 1864 McCausland raid

The current building replaced its predecessor that was burnt on July 30, 1864 by Confederate forces under Brigadier General John A. McCausland in the American Civil War. McCausland was acting under the orders of General Jubal A. Early. Early was commander of the Shenandoah Valley, which was subject to much destruction by the Union forces. He was eager to retaliate against the North. Chambersburg deserved this retaliation, in his view, in part for its sympathy with John Brown while planning his raid on Harpers Ferry. McCausland offered the people of Chambersburg the chance to ransom the town for $100,000 in gold or $500,000 in greenbacks. When they did not pay, he carried on with the destruction of the town, including the second courthouse. Only the walls and pillars remained after the burning.

The current Greek Revival structure was designed by S. Hutton. The construction was superintended by Samuel Seibert. They designed and built the structure around the remaining walls and columns left from the previous courthouse. It stands two and half stories high, and is built of brick. There are fifty-four windows, twenty-two on each side and five each front and back. It features a domed clock cupola with a statue of Benjamin Franklin on top. There are also six symmetrically placed chimneys on the roof. It was expanded in 1902 in the same architectural style.

The courthouse is a contributing property in the Chambersburg Historic District. Chambersburg is the largest Northern community that was burned in the Civil War.

It was listed on the National Register of Historic Places in 1974. It is included in the Chambersburg Historic District.

== See also ==
- List of state and county courthouses in Pennsylvania
