= List of state and county courthouses in Pennsylvania =

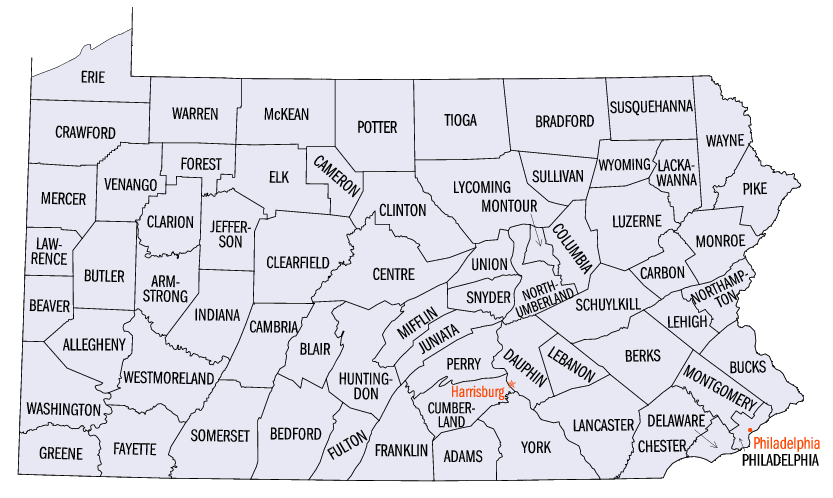

This is a list of former and current non-federal courthouses in the Commonwealth of Pennsylvania. Each of the 67 counties in the Commonwealth has a city or borough designated as the county seat where the county government resides, including a county courthouse for the court of general jurisdiction, the Court of Common Pleas. Other courthouses are used by the three state-wide appellate courts (the Supreme Court, the Superior Court, and the Commonwealth Court), or minor courts such as the municipal courts of Philadelphia and Pittsburgh, or magisterial district courts. As noted below, some courthouses are listed on the National Register of Historic Places.

== 17th-19th centuries ==
After William Penn landed in the new Province of Pennsylvania in 1682, he set up a general-purpose Provincial Court. The state supreme court traces its origin to that institution. The oldest existing building in the Commonwealth that was used for the judiciary is the Chester County Courthouse of 1724, used for trials until 1967. The Franklin County courthouse was destroyed by Confederate troops in 1864 during the American Civil War.

== State and county courthouses ==
Courthouse	Image	County	Location	Built	Architect	Style	Notes	Additional References
Old Adams County Courthouse		Adams	Gettysburg; 39.83093°N 77.23087°W	1804	unknown	Federal	Pennsylvania Historical Marker Text: First courthouse for Adams County stood in old Center Square from 1804 to 1859. The land for the Square was given by James Gettys.	
Adams County Courthouse		Adams	Gettysburg; 39.829444°N 77.2325°W	1858	Stephen Decatur Button	Italianate	NRHP-listed (refnum 74001728). John R. Turner of Carlisle constructed the building. The building is two stories high, three bays wide, six bays deep and constructed of red brick, which was originally painted gray. Rear wings were added in 1895. A large clock tower reaches about 70 feet (21 m) above ground level. During the Battle of Gettysburg the building served as both a command post and as a hospital, for both Union and Confederate armies.	
Old Allegheny County Courthouses		Allegheny	Pittsburgh	1794, 1841		Greek Revival (1841)	Pittsburgh's original courthouse, first occupied in 1794, was a wooden structure located on one side of Market Square. The Pennsylvania Supreme Court and from December 7, 1818, until 1841 the federal Western District of Pennsylvania also held court sessions at Market Square. Land for a new courthouse was purchased in April 1834. Construction took place between 1836 and 1840. This court house was built with polished gray sandstone, quarried at Coal Hill (present-day Mount Washington), opposite Water Street along the Monongahela River. The Greek Revival design included a domed cupola housing a rotunda 60 feet (18 m) in diameter and 80 feet (24 m) high. The building was completed in 1841. The building's second floor again served as the headquarters for both the Commonwealth Supreme Court Pittsburgh region and the Federal Western District, serving the latter until a new U.S. Customs House/Post Office opened on Fifth and Smithfield in 1853. Due to corrosion caused by coal smoke, the building deteriorated: the dressed surface of the facade dropped off, some of the cornices near the roof began to fall, and the building had a scaly appearance. On May 7, 1882, a fire broke out and ruined the building. Subsequently, it was demolished. The third, and present, courthouse was erected on the same spot.	
Allegheny County Courthouse		Allegheny	Pittsburgh; 40.4384°N 79.9961°W	1888	Henry Hobson Richardson	Romanesque Revival	NRHP-listed (refnum 73001586 as Allegheny County Courthouse and Jail). It is part of a complex (along with the old Allegheny County Jail). The design of the Allegheny County Courthouse has influenced buildings in many cities across America, such as Minneapolis City Hall, Altgeld Hall on the campus of the University of Illinois at Urbana–Champaign, and James W. McLaughlin's Wayne County Courthouse in Richmond, Indiana.	
Armstrong County Courthouse		Armstrong	Kittanning; 40.816389°N 79.516667°W	1860	Hulings and Dickey	Greek Revival	NRHP-listed (refnum 81000526). The courthouse was built between 1858 and 1860, and is a two-story, brick-and-stone building measuring 105 feet by 65 feet. It has a hipped roof topped by an octagonal cupola and bell. It features a portico with four Corinthian order columns in Greek Revival style.	
Old Beaver County Courthouse		Beaver	Beaver	1875	Thomas Boyd	Second Empire	Courthouse is illustrated in a 1910 postcard. It was rebuilt in 1933 after a fire in a then-contemporary Streamline Moderne style.	
Beaver County Courthouse		Beaver	Beaver; 40.6947°N 80.3086°W	2002		Postmodern		
Bedford County Courthouse		Bedford	Bedford	1828	Jason Filler	Federal		
Old Berks County Courthouse		Berks	Reading	1840		Classical Revival	Old Courthouse as it appeared in 1854 is shown.	
Berks County Courthouse		Berks	Reading; 40.336551°N 75.925381°W	1932	Miles Boyer Dechant	Art Deco		
Blair County Courthouse		Blair	Hollidaysburg; 40.430278°N 78.3925°W	1877	David S. Glendall	Gothic Revival	NRHP-listed (refnum 76001606). It was built in 1875–1876, and is a T-shaped stone building. The entrance is flanked by two square, three-story towers with truncated pyramidal roofs. The building generally features elaborate stonework and a five-story clock tower topped by a tall stone spire.	
Bradford County Courthouse		Bradford	Towanda; 41.766389°N 76.439167°W	1848	Israel Lehman, Theodore Schmitt	Renaissance Revival	NRHP-listed (refnum 86003573). It was built between 1896 and 1898, and is a four-story, cruciform-shaped building. It has rusticated sandstone exterior walls and a 50-foot diameter octagonal dome atop the roof. It features an entrance portico supported by Tuscan order columns.	
Old Bucks County Courthouse		Bucks	Doylestown	1878	Addison Hutton	Romanesque Revival		
Bucks County Courthouse		Bucks	Doylestown	1962	Carroll, Grisdale & Van Alen and Fred F. Martin	Modern		
Old Butler County Courthouse		Butler	Butler	1807	unknown	Classical Revival		
Butler County Courthouse		Butler	Butler; 40.858333°N 79.896111°W	1885	James P. Bailey	High Victorian Gothic	NRHP-listed (refnum 77001132). It was built in 1885, and is a three-story, brick and sandstone building. It features a large central, four-faced clock tower with two double pyramid shaped roofs. It is the tallest structure in downtown Butler. The first and second floors are designed to be gothic and art deco with several crown moldings, domed ceilings, marble floors and walls, and woodwork.	
Cambria County Courthouse		Cambria	Ebensburg; 40.483611°N 78.724722°W	1882	Milton Earl Beebe	Second Empire	NRHP-listed (refnum 80003449). It was built in 1880–1881, and is a 3 1/2-story, brick building. It features a mansard roof. Henry Shenk constructed it at a cost of $109,962. The building is a parallelogram with a 120 ft. of frontage on Center St. with a depth of 80 ft. The height to the eaves of the roof is 48 ft. The mansard slate roof has porthole dormers and elaborate chimneys and a decorative bracketed cornice. The central pavilion has flanking pilasters supporting a classic portico. Courtroom 1 was added in 1923. It is one of the largest courtrooms in the United States, with 500 seats.	
Cameron County Courthouse		Cameron	Emporium	1890	A.S. Wagner	Romanesque Revival		
Carbon County Courthouse		Carbon	Jim Thorpe; 40.8637°N 75.7381°W	1893	L.S. Jacoby	Romanesque Revival		
Centre County Courthouse		Centre	Bellefonte; 40.912222°N 77.776944°W	1805	Ezra Ale	Greek Revival	NRHP-listed (refnum 76001618). The original section was built in 1805. It is a rectangular brick building on a stone foundation, measuring 135 feet long by 60 feet wide. The building is faced in stucco and has a gable roof topped by a cupola. It features an entry porch with eight 26 foot high smooth faced columns with Ionic order capitals. The porch was added in 1835.	
Old Chester County Courthouse		Chester	Chester; 39.8478°N 75.3599°W	1724	unknown	German Colonial	NRHP-listed (refnum 71000702). Chester, Pennsylvania is the former county seat for Chester County, Pennsylvania, one of the three counties in the Province of Pennsylvania laid out by William Penn. It is the oldest courthouse still standing in the United States. The courthouse is 2 1/2 stories high with no basement and 2 foot thick walls. The south and east facades of the building are hewn stone with the other two built of rubble stone. The Quaker influence on the building can be seen in the two front doors, one for men and the other for women. The interior measures 31 by 36 feet. The first level has a stone floor court room divided by a low wooden railing that was designed to separate the judges and lawyers from court observers. There are no fireplaces on the first floor but both the jury room and petit jury room on the second floor have fireplaces. The cupola on the courthouse contained a bell that was cast in London and added in 1729. The court room was the oldest active court in use in the United States until 1967.	
Chester County Courthouse		Chester	West Chester; 39.959861°N 75.605°W	1846	Thomas U. Walter	Greek Revival	NRHP-listed (refnum 72001109). It was built in 1846 at a cost of $55,346. Walter also designed the dome of the United States Capitol. An addition, designed by T. Roney Williamson and constructed from Indiana Limestone, was added in 1893. Another addition was added in 1966. Ground was broken in early 1846, and the cornerstone was placed on July 4; the courthouse was completed in late 1847, with the total cost of the project reaching $55,345.98. It was listed on the National Register of Historic Places on June 5, 1972, and located in the West Chester Downtown Historic District.	
Old Clarion County Courthouse		Clarion	Clarion	ca. 1865		Italianate		
Clarion County Courthouse		Clarion	Clarion; 41.215278°N 79.385833°W	1885	E.M. Butz	Queen Anne	NRHP-listed (refnum 79002208). The courthouse was built between 1883 and 1885, and is a 3 1/2-story, brick Victorian structure with Classical details measuring 78 feet, 8 inches, wide and 134 feet deep. It has a 213-foot-tall, 25-feet-square, clock tower. Two earlier courthouses were built on the site: the first was completed in 1843, the second in 1863. Both were built of brick and both were destroyed by fire. The second courthouse burned down on September 12, 1882. The architect was E.M. Butz of Allegheny, Pennsylvania (now part of Pittsburgh) who designed the building in the Queen Anne style and the supervising architect was D. English of Brockville. Henry Warner of Allegheny painted the frescos. The floor tiling was laid by the Star Encaustic Tile Company of Pittsburgh and the Howard Clock Company of New York supplied the 9-foot diameter clock dial and the 1313 pound bell. A galvanized iron sculpture called the "Lady of Justice", standing 9 feet 11 inches tall on top of the clock tower, is of unknown origin. The "Lady of Justice" was restored in 1981. About 25 bullet holes were in the statue and her left arm was missing.	
Clearfield County Courthouse		Clearfield	Clearfield; 41.022222°N 78.437778°W	1860	Cleaveland and Bachus	Second Empire	NRHP-listed (refnum 79002210). It is a 2 1/2-story brick structure constructed in 1860. An addition was completed in 1884. It features a square brick clock tower with a bell shaped roof.	
Clinton County Courthouse		Clinton	Lock Haven	1867	Samuel Sloan, Addison Hutton	Romanesque Revival		
Columbia County Courthouse		Columbia	Bloomsburg; 41.003230°N 76.457030°W	1890	A.S. Wagner	Romanesque Revival		
Old Crawford County Courthouse		Crawford	Meadville	1870		Classical Revival	Pennsylvania Historical Marker Text: At the South Ward schools, Elias Allen tried unsuccessfully to enroll his two children. He appealed to the Crawford County Court of Common Pleas, and Judge Pearson Church declared unconstitutional the 1854 state law mandating separate schools for Negro children. This law was amended, effective July 4, 1881, to prohibit such segregation.	
Crawford County Judicial Center	Photo found at this reference:	Crawford	Meadville; 41.638670°N 80.149520°W	2017		Postmodern		
Old Cumberland County Courthouse		Cumberland	Carlisle	1846	Daniel E. Witt, Samuel Bryan, Jr.	Classical Revival	On July 1, 1863, the Confederate Army, under the command of General J.E.B. Stuart, demanded that the Union surrender and General William Smith replied, "shell and be damned." The Confederates then shelled the town and one of the columns at the courthouse bears the mark of the artillery barrage. Following the attack, General Robert E. Lee ordered the Confederate unit to the Battle of Gettysburg. The courthouse was also critical for the Underground Railroad in Pennsylvania. One runaway slave case at the courthouse resulted in the largest fine assessed from a federal fugitive slave system. Another case fueled a riot in 1847 that resulted in the death of a southern slave-holder, the first death of a slave-holder North of the Mason-Dixon Line.	
Cumberland County Courthouse		Cumberland	Carlisle	1961	Lawrie and Green	Modern		
Old Dauphin County Courthouses		Dauphin	Harrisburg; 40.2605°N 76.8813°W	1799, 1860	unknown		Pennsylvania Historical Marker Text: Two Dauphin County Courthouses occupied this site. The first, built 1792–99, served as the State House for the Pennsylvania Legislature from 1812 to 1821. It was removed in 1860. The second stood here from 1860 to 1948. (The 1792 courthouse in the illustration is shown in 1858.)	
Dauphin County Courthouse		Dauphin	Harrisburg; 40.258333°N 76.8825°W	1942	Lawrie and Green	Art Deco	NRHP-listed (refnum 93000723). The current courthouse was designed in 1940. The interior artwork was done by sculptor C. Paul Jennewein.	
Pennsylvania Judicial Center		Dauphin	Harrisburg; 40.265°N 76.882222°W	2010		New Classical	This contains the Commonwealth Court's sole courtroom in the state.	
Pennsylvania State Capitol Building		Dauphin	Harrisburg; 40.264441°N 76.883624°W	1906	Joseph Miller Huston	Beaux Arts	The Supreme Court, and the Superior Court meet at different times of the year in courtrooms in Harrisburg, Philadelphia, and Pittsburgh. The Superior Court also occasionally holds sessions in other parts of the state. The Supreme and Superior Court Chamber in the capitol building is used by both courts and was designed using ancient Greek and Roman themes. It is located on the fourth floor of the capitol, on the east side of the rotunda. A cycle of 16 panels, painted between 1917 and 1927, begins and ends with Divine Law as its keystone, over the main entrance. Around the room clockwise the murals represent the Law of Nature; Greek, Hebrew, and Christian Revealed Law; Roman Law of Reason; English Common Law; William Penn as Law-Giver; State, National, and International law, and finally, the Spirit of Divine Law. A stained-glass dome, designed by Pennsylvania native Alfred Godwin, is in the center of the ceiling.	
Old Delaware County Courthouse		Delaware	Media	1851	Samuel Sloan	Classical Revival		
Delaware County Courthouse		Delaware	Media	1913		Classical Revival		
Elk County Courthouse		Elk	Ridgway	1879	J.H. Marston	Second Empire	The courthouse is red brick with sandstone. The tower originally supported a statue of Justice, which was destroyed by lightning in the 1930s. The interior was modernized in about 1969.	
Erie County Courthouse		Erie	Erie; 42.129280°N 80.087980°W	1855	Thomas Ustick Walter	Classical Revival		
Fayette County Courthouse		Fayette	Uniontown	1890	E.M. Butz, William Kaufman	Romanesque Revival		
Forest County Courthouse		Forest	Tionesta	1870	Keene Vaughn	Plain	A simple brick building with stone accents. It has a Palladian window above the entrance, and a simulated pediment with a small lunette. The interior has been modernized.	
Old Franklin County Courthouse		Franklin	Chambersburg; 41.215278°N 79.385833°W	1842		Greek Revival	Image shows courthouse after the Raid on Chambersburg and destruction by Confederate troops on July 30, 1864. It was the second county courthouse on the site.	
Franklin County Courthouse		Franklin	Chambersburg; 41.215278°N 79.385833°W	1865	S. Hutton	Greek Revival	NRHP-listed (refnum 74001784). The building was designed and built around the remaining walls and columns left from the courthouse destroyed in 1864. It stands two and half stories high, and is built of brick. There are fifty-four windows, twenty-two on each side and five each front and back. It features a domed clock cupola with a statue of Benjamin Franklin on top. There are also six symmetrically placed chimneys on the roof.	
Fulton County Courthouse		Fulton	McConnellsburg	1851	Jacob Stoner	Greek Revival		
Grant Building		Allegheny	Pittsburgh; 40.4375°N 79.9975°W	1929	Henry Hornbostel	Art Deco	Location for the Pittsburgh sessions of the Superior Court.	
Greene County Courthouse		Greene	Waynesburg	1852	Samuel and John Bryan	Classical Revival		
Huntingdon County Courthouse		Huntingdon	Huntingdon	1883	Milton Earl Beebe	Second Empire		
Old Indiana County Courthouse		Indiana	Indiana; 40.623056°N 79.151944°W	1869	James W. Drum	Second Empire, Italianate	NRHP-listed (refnum 74001788). The courthouse was built between 1869 and 1870. It was the second courthouse to serve the county, with the first demolished in 1868. The final cost of the project was $150,000. The architecture is primarily red brick and stone. The roof was designed in the Mansard style. The courthouse features a gold leaf cupola clocktower with four faces. The main courtroom, located on the second floor measured 100 feet (30 m) by 82 feet (25 m), with a 30 feet (9.1 m) ceiling. The large clock in the cupola was the largest in the county at the time. The courthouse held its final session on November 11, 1970. Today, the entire bell tower is supported by scaffolding set up in the main court room of the building, due to the age of the building's supports.	
Indiana County Courthouse		Indiana	Indiana	1968	Lawrie and Green	Modern		
Jefferson County Courthouse		Jefferson	Brookville	1869	James W. Drum	Italianate		
Old Juniata County Courthouse		Juniata	Mifflintown	1833	unknown	Classical Revival	See this reference for the Courthouse Brochure	
Juniata County Courthouse		Juniata	Mifflintown	1875	L.M. Simon	Classical Revival	See this reference for the Courthouse Brochure	
Lackawanna County Courthouse		Lackawanna	Scranton; 41.408056°N 75.662778°W	1884	Isaac G. Perry	Romanesque Revival	NRHP-listed (refnum 97001257). The courthouse was built in 1884, and is a 3 1/2-story rectangular masonry building, with a raised basement. The building measures approximately 100 by 140 feet (30 by 43 m). It features a five-story clock tower. Pennsylvania Historical Marker Text: In May 1902, 150,000 mineworkers struck for six months for union recognition, higher wages, shorter hours, and other demands. The Anthracite Coal Strike Commission, set up by President Theodore Roosevelt, held hearings at the Lackawanna County Courthouse and granted some demands in March 1903. Among the longest in U.S. history, the strike introduced unbiased federal intervention in labor disputes.	
Old Lancaster County Courthouse		Lancaster	Lancaster; 40.03776°N 76.30588°W	1729	unknown	Georgian	Pennsylvania Historical Marker Text: Old courthouse stood in the center of this square, 1739–1853. Here Continental Congress met for a day, September 27, 1777, thus making Lancaster one of the capitals of the United States.	
Lancaster County Courthouse		Lancaster	Lancaster; 40.038333°N 76.304167°W	1855	Samuel Sloan	Romanesque Revival	NRHP-listed (refnum 78002415). The original building was built between 1852 and 1855.	
Lawrence County Courthouse		Lawrence	New Castle; 40.998333°N 80.339444°W	1852	unknown	Greek Revival	NRHP-listed (refnum 78002419). The original building was built between 1850 and 1855, and is a two-story, six-bay-by-three-bay structure. It features a portico with six Ionic order columns and a cupola.	
Old Lebanon County Courthouse		Lebanon	Lebanon	1818	unknown	Federal		
Lebanon County and City Building (and courthouse)	Photos and information found at this reference:	Lebanon	Lebanon	1960	William Lynch Murray	Modern	The Lebanon County and City Building is the home of the Court of Common Pleas.	
Old Lehigh County Courthouse		Lehigh	Allentown; 40.603611°N 75.4677784°W	1819	unknown	Italianate	NRHP-listed (refnum 81000550). The original section was built between 1814 and 1819, and was a 2 1/2-story, stone building with a hipped roof. It was remodeled and enlarged in 1864.	
Lehigh County Courthouse		Lehigh	Allentown	1965	Wolf & Hahn	Modern		
Old Luzerne County Courthouse		Luzerne	Wilkes-Barre	1856		Romanesque Revival		
Luzerne County Courthouse		Luzerne	Wilkes-Barre; 41.251389°N 75.879444°W	1909	Frederick John Osterling	Classical Revival	NRHP-listed (refnum 80003566). The courthouse was built between 1906 and 1909. It is a cruciform plan building in the style, with a domed central rotunda 53 feet in diameter. It is built of Ohio sandstone, reinforced concrete, and terra cotta.	
Old Lycoming County Courthouse		Lycoming	Williamsport	1860	Samuel Sloan	Italianate		
Lycoming County Courthouse		Lycoming	Williamsport	1970	Wagner, Hartman	Modern		
Old McKean County Courthouses		McKean	Smethport	1827, 1851, 1881	Milton Earl Beebe (1881)	Federal (1851)	The 1851 McKean County Courthouse is pictured	
McKean County Courthouse		McKean	Smethport; 41.809590°N 78.447720°W	1942	Thomas K. Hendrix	Classic Revival		
Mercer County Court House		Mercer	Mercer	1909	Owsley Boucherle & Owsley	Beaux Arts		
Old Mifflin County Courthouse		Mifflin	Lewistown; 40.5975°N 77.575556°W	1843		Greek Revival	NRHP-listed (refnum 76001649). It was built in 1842–1843, and is a 2 1/2-story, brick building. It is three bays wide and the original building measured 48 feet by 82 feet. It was enlarged by 48 feet to the rear in 1878. It features a pedimented entryway with two engaged pilasters and prominent cupola. The courthouse has been updated and restored, with the second floor courtroom restored to a late 19th-century appearance.	
Mifflin County Courthouse	Photo found at this reference:	Mifflin	Lewistown	1978	Jon Spalding	Modern		
Monroe County Courthouse		Monroe	Stroudsburg; 40.986944°N 75.195278°W	1890	T. I. Lacey & Son	Romanesque Revival	NRHP-listed (refnum 9000097). The original section was built in 1890, and is a three-story, ashlar sandstone and limestone building measuring 65 feet wide and 180 feet long	
Montgomery County Courthouse		Montgomery	Norristown	1854	Schermerhorn and Reinhold	Classical Revival	This courthouse was the location of the Bill Cosby sexual assault trial and conviction in 2018.	
Montour County Courthouse		Montour	Danville	1871	O'Malley	Italianate		
Northampton County Courthouse		Northampton	Easton	1861	C. Graham	Classical Revival		
Northumberland County Courthouse		Northumberland	Sunbury; 40.861667°N 76.795278°W	1865	Samuel Sloan	Romanesque Revival	NRHP-listed (refnum 74001800). It is a three-story, brick building. A three-story wing was added in 1911. It features three arched doors on the front facade, brownstone quoins at the corners, and a clock tower with a copper dome. The tower bell was donated by Simon Cameron. In 1878, it was the site of the murder trial and conviction of the last Molly Maguire, Peter McManus.	
Perry County Courthouse		Perry	New Bloomfield; 40.42°N 77.1875°W	1827	Jacob Bishop	Greek Revival	NRHP-listed (refnum 75001659). The courthouse was built in 1826 and completed the next year. It was extensively altered in 1868. It is a two-story white brick structure, three bays wide and six bays long. The low hipped roof is crowned by a cupola dated to 1826. An annex was completed about 1892.	
Old Philadelphia County Courthouses		Philadelphia	Philadelphia; 39.9491°N 75.1507°W	1709, 1789		Georgian	The first illustration shows the early courthouse built in 1709, and razed in 1837. It was located in the center of what is now Market Street. The second illustration is of the building is known as "Congress Hall" for having housed the US Congress when Philadelphia was capital city of the United States. During the almost ten years it served as the federal capitol building, Congress Hall witnessed many historic events including the admittance of Vermont, Kentucky, and Tennessee as new states. The United States Bill of Rights was ratified at Congress Hall in 1791. The second Presidential inauguration of George Washington took place in the House chamber in 1793, as did inauguration of John Adams in 1797. Congress also used the time to establish the First Bank of the United States, the Federal Mint, and the United States Department of the Navy. The Jay Treaty, which secured a temporary peace with Great Britain, was also ratified at Congress Hall in 1796. After the capital moved to Washington in 1800, Congress Hall returned to its original function as the Philadelphia County Courthouse and served as the location of both state and federal courts during the early 19th century.	
Philadelphia City Hall (and courthouse)		Philadelphia	Philadelphia; 39.952394°N 75.163597°W	1901	John McArthur Jr., Thomas Ustick Walter	Second Empire	NRHP-listed (refnum 76001666). Courtrooms for various trial-level courts, and for the Supreme Court of Pennsylvania's Philadelphia sessions, are located in the City Hall.	
Justice Juanita Kidd Stout Center for Criminal Justice		Philadelphia	Philadelphia; 39.953709°N 75.161622°E	1994		Postmodern	The Justice Juanita Kidd Stout Center for Criminal Justice (formerly the Criminal Justice Center or CJC) is the main criminal courthouse of the First Judicial District of Pennsylvania (which comprises Philadelphia), housing the Criminal Section of the Philadelphia Court of Common Pleas and the Criminal Division of the Philadelphia Municipal Court. It is a 17-story building completed in 1994 to alleviate pressure from courtrooms located in Philadelphia City Hall. The center is located at 1301 Filbert Street. In 2012 it was renamed in honor of the late Justice Juanita Kidd Stout. It is 604,000 square feet with 66 courtrooms, 60 judges' chambers, secure holding / detention cells, and supporting administrative and processing areas. The building is framed in steel with stone and architectural precast cladding. Lobbies, corridors, and other common spaces have high-finish terrazzo floors, interior molded stone, and glass fiber reinforced gypsum ceilings. Courtrooms and chambers have an extensive amount of detailed carpentry in the finishes of wall panels, judge and jury benches, doors, framing, and other millwork. The facility also Includes one of the largest central cooling plants on the east coast, over 5,000 tons.	
Penn Mutual Building		Philadelphia	Philadelphia; 39.947305°N 75.150749°W	1914	Edgar Viguers Seeler	Beaux Arts	Located at 530 Walnut Street, it houses the Philadelphia sessions of the Superior Court.	
Old Pike County Courthouse		Pike	Milford	1815	unknown	German Colonial	The Old Stone Courthouse in Milford, Pennsylvania was built in 1814-15 and was in use from 1815 to 1874, when the current courthouse, which is located across the street, was completed. The first church services of the First Presbyterian (1823), Methodist (1825) and Episcopal (1866) Churches were held in the courthouse, which also served as the County Jail in 1815. It is located within the Milford Historic District.	
Pike County Courthouse		Pike	Milford; 41.324444°N 74.801111°W	1874	George Barton	Second Empire	NRHP-listed (refnum 79002340). It was built in 1873, and is a 2 1/2-story, eight-bay-by-six-bay, brick building. It features a projecting front section with pediment and a square cupola.	
Pittsburgh City-County Building		Allegheny	Pittsburgh; 40.438367°N 79.997147°W	1917	Henry Hornbostel	Beaux Arts	Location for the Pittsburgh sessions of the Supreme Court.	
Potter County Courthouse		Potter	Coudersport; 41.774444°N 78.020556°W	1853	William Bell	Greek Revival, Victorian	NRHP-listed (refnum 75001664). The construction began in 1851 and completed in 1853.	
Old Schuylkill County Courthouse		Schuylkill	Pottsville	1851		Federal		
Schuylkill County Courthouse		Schuylkill	Pottsville	1892	Milton Earl Beebe	Romanesque Revival		
Snyder County Courthouse		Snyder	Middleburg	1855, 1915	J.F. Stetler	Italianate		
Old Somerset County Courthouse		Somerset	Somerset	1853		Classical Revival		
Somerset County Courthouse		Somerset	Somerset; 40.009722°N 79.078056°W	1906	J.C. Fuller	Beaux Arts	NRHP-listed (refnum 80003634). Built between 1904 and 1906, it is a two-story building measuring 146 feet by 112 feet, and 135 feet tall. Made of Indiana limestone, it sits on a sandstone foundation. The building has a terra cotta tile roof, and central tower with copper dome. It features a semicircular portico supported by four unfluted Corinthian order.	
State-wide locations		state-wide	state-wide	variable	variable	variable	Numerous magisterial district courts are located throughout Pennsylvania. They are courts of minor jurisdiction, typically housed in small buildings or even strip-mall store-front type locations for easy access by the public. They handle minor criminal offenses including misdemeanors, infractions such as traffic and non-traffic citations, and petty offenses, as well as civil matters like civil wedding ceremonies and emergency Protection from Abuse petitions. The magisterial district courts also resolve small civil disputes such as breaches of contracts, landlord-tenant issues, and torts, not exceeding a monetary recovery of $12,000 including expenses like lawyer's fees and filing fees. The court pictured is the 07-1-06 Magisterial District Court in Feasterville, Bucks County.	
Sullivan County Courthouse		Sullivan	Laporte; 41.423611°N 76.494167°W	1894	Wagner and Reitmeyer	Romanesque Revival	NRHP-listed (refnum 78002472). It is a rectangular building measuring approximately 92 feet by 60 feet, built of brick with a slate roof. The building is located in the smallest and highest county seat in Pennsylvania, at an elevation of over 2,000 feet (610 m) above sea level.	
Susquehanna County Courthouse		Susquehanna	Montrose; 41.834444°N 75.876389°W	1855	William H. Boyd, Avery Frink	Greek Revival	NRHP-listed (refnum 96000706). The original section of the courthouse was built in 1854–1855, and is a three-bay-by-seven-bay, two-story brick structure. It features a pedimented portico with fluted Ionic order columns and five-bay arcade at the first level. It has a shallow gable roof topped by an octagonal cupola.	
Tioga County Courthouse		Tioga	Wellsboro	1835	unknown	Federal		
Old Union County Courthouse		Union	New Berlin; 40.878611°N 76.986667°W	1815	unknown	Federal	NRHP-listed (refnum 72001179). It was built in 1815, and renovated in 1855–1857, to convert it to a schoolhouse. It is a 2 1/2-story, brick building, three bays wide and four bays deep with a gable roof. The roof features a center cupola. It was used as a school until 1952.	
Union County Courthouse		Union	Lewisburg	1855	Lewis Palmer	Greek Revival		
Venango County Courthouse		Venango	Franklin	1868	Samuel Sloan	Italianate		
Warren County Courthouse		Warren	Warren; 41.848611°N 79.147222°W	1877	Milton Earl Beebe	Second Empire	NRHP-listed (refnum 77001198). It was built in 1876–1877, and is a 2 1/2-story, brick and sandstone building. It has a slate covered mansard roof. It measures 72 feet by 122 feet, and has a large 4-sided dome topped by a square clock tower and statue of justice.	
Washington County Courthouse		Washington	Washington; 40.17045°N 80.245803°W	1900	Frederick John Osterling	Beaux Arts	NRHP-listed (refnum 74001812).	
Wayne County Courthouse		Wayne	Honesdale	1880	J. A. Wood	Italianate		
Old Westmoreland County Courthouses		Westmoreland	Greensburg; 40.302645°N 79.544636°E	1787, 1801, 1854			The first courthouse was used from 1787 to 1801. The second courthouse was demolished in 1854 and the third (pictured) was demolished in 1901.	
Westmoreland County Courthouse		Westmoreland	Greensburg; 40.302645°N 79.544636°E	1906	William Kaufman	Beaux Arts	NRHP-listed (refnum 78002485).	
Wyoming County Courthouse		Wyoming	Tunkhannock	1870	D.R. Nott	Italianate		
Old York County Courthouse		York	York; 39.9623°N 76.7274°W	1754	unknown	Georgian	A two-story red-colored-brick-and-wood structure on landscaped grounds; reconstructed in 1976. Pennsylvania Historical Marker Text: Continental Congress held its session, September 30, 1777–June 28, 1778 in Courthouse which stood in the center of this square. Here, Treaties with France and Articles of Confederation were adopted. The Articles were our nation's first constitution. Adopted November 15, 1777, in the York County Courthouse, the Articles united the 13 colonies by establishing the government of the United States of America. Remained in effect until replaced by the Constitution in 1789.	
Old York County Courthouse		York	York	1837		Classical Revival		
Old York County Courthouse		York	York	1900	John A. Dempwolf	Beaux Arts	The 1900 Courthouse pictured in a 1915 postcard.	
York County Judicial Center		York	York	2004	Hellmuth, Obata & Kassabaum	Postmodern	The building is a "six story red colored brick, glass and concrete structure. The west front has a semi-circular portico with recessed entrance. On the north and south are two story projecting sections. Behind the portico is a sold glass wall with large towers on the north and south sides. The roof line is flat."	

== See also ==
- List of United States federal courthouses in Pennsylvania
- Pennsylvania Constitution
- List of courthouses in the United States

== Sources ==
- Williams, Oliver P. (2001). County Courthouses of Pennsylvania, A Guide. Mechanicsburg, Pennsylvania: Stackpole Books. ISBN 0-8117-2738-6.
