= Townhouse Row =

Historic houses in Pennsylvania, United States

- U.S. National Register of Historic Places
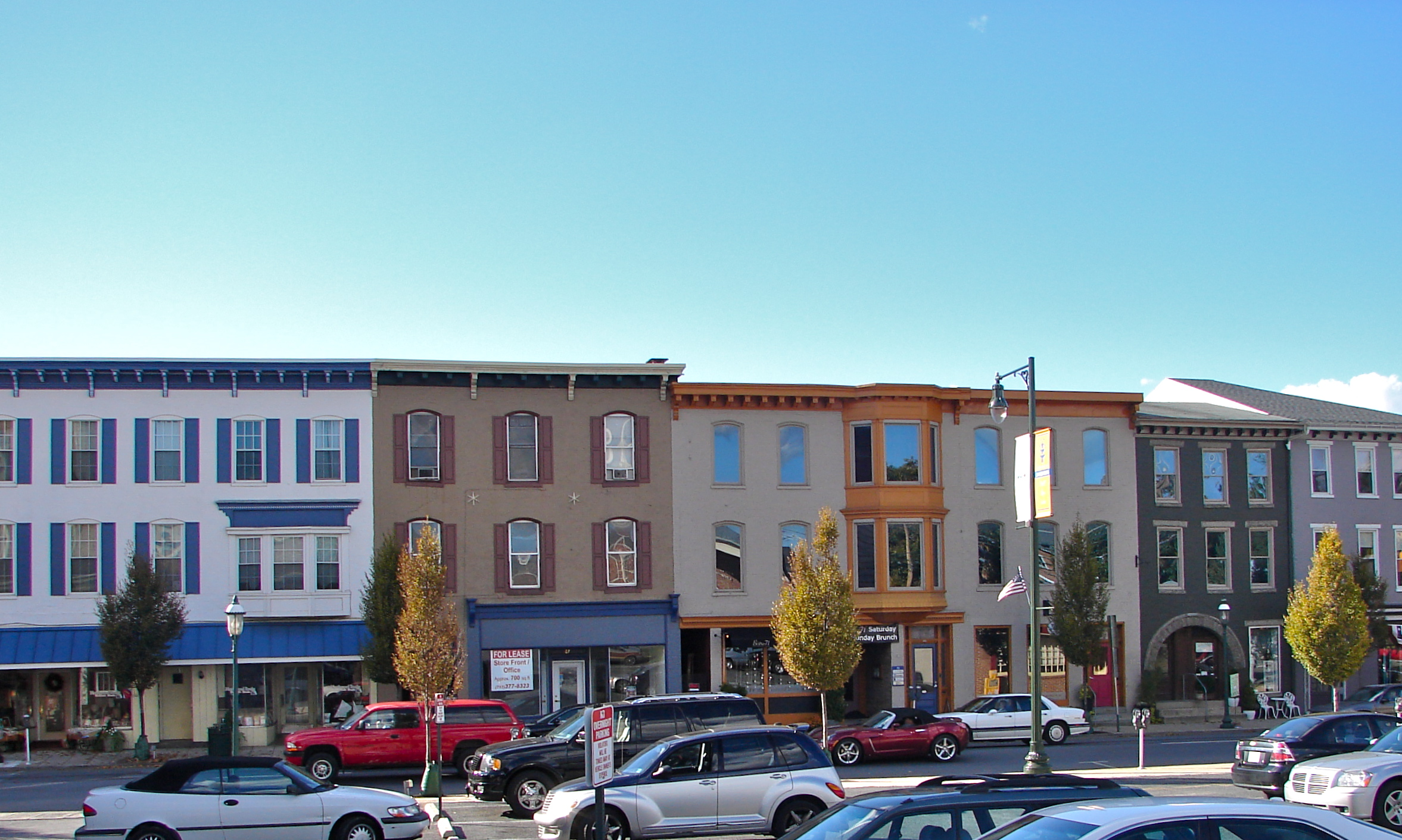
- Townhouse Row October 2010

- Location within Pennsylvania Location within the United States
- Interactive map showing the location for Townhouse Row
- Location: 57-85 N. Main St., Chambersburg, Pennsylvania
- Coordinates: 39°56′19″N 77°39′43″W
- Area: 5 acres (2.0 ha)
- Built: 1864
- NRHP reference No.: 78002401
- Added to NRHP: December 18, 1978

Townhouse Row is a set of seven historic, American townhouses located in Chambersburg in Franklin County, Pennsylvania.

They were listed on the National Register of Historic Places in 1978 and are included in the Chambersburg Historic District.

== History and architectural features ==
These historic structures are three-story, brick townhouses that were built starting in the third quarter of the nineteenth century. They were erected following the burning of Chambersburg by the Confederate Army during the American Civil War. Individual townhouses have undergone various additions and modifications since that time.
