= Lawrence County Courthouse (Pennsylvania) =

- U.S. National Register of Historic Places
- Pennsylvania state historical marker
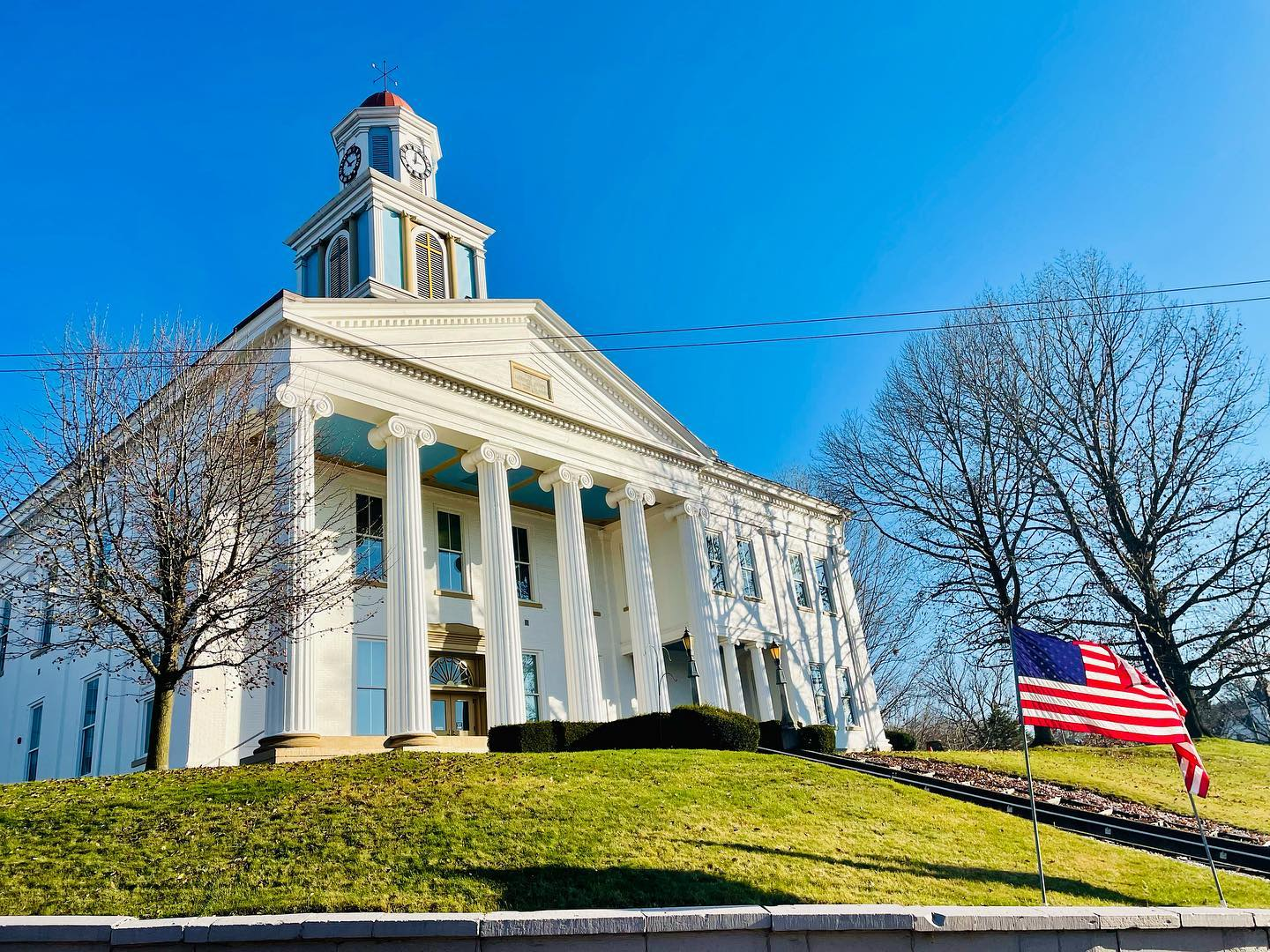
- Lawrence County Courthouse

- Location within Pennsylvania Location within the United States
- Interactive map showing the location for Lawrence County Courthouse
- Location: Court St., New Castle, Pennsylvania
- Coordinates: 40°59′54″N 80°20′22″W
- Area: less than one acre
- Built: 1850-1855
- Architectural style: Greek Revival
- NRHP reference No.: 78002419

Significant dates
- Added to NRHP: December 15, 1978
- Designated PHMC: October 2, 1982

The Lawrence County Courthouse is an historic courthouse building that is located in New Castle, Lawrence County, Pennsylvania, United States.

It was added to the National Register of Historic Places in 1978.

== History and architectural features ==
The original building was built between 1850 and 1855, and is a two-story, six-bay by three-bay Greek Revival-style structure. It features a portico with six Ionic order columns and a cupola. Major additions to the original structure were built between 1885 and 1886, in 1914 (extended in 1939), and between 1943 and 1944. A small addition to connect the 1885-1886 and 1914-1939 additions was built in 1947.

During the 1950s, the original cupola containing the clock tower was removed, after standing atop the courthouse roof since its construction and throughout the early twentieth century.

Twenty years later, additional changes were made. The Lawrence County Government Center was built in 1977 and attached to the courthouse on its northwest side. The courthouse was then added to the National Register of Historic Places in 1978.

The courthouse tower had a flat roof until 2002, when the county invested $225,000 to erect a new cupola with a clock tower, complete with a carillon of chimes.

The bell from the original clock tower now rests in the plaza behind the courthouse near the main entrance to the adjacent Lawrence County Government Center, according to a plaque on the front of the courthouse. The new clock tower was dedicated to the people of Lawrence County on October 7, 2002. The Commissioners were Roger M. Decarbo, Brian D. Burick, and Edward F. Fosnaught, the Chief Clerk/Administrator was Charleen T. Micco, and the Building Superintendent was Frank Picari.

== See also ==
- List of state and county courthouses in Pennsylvania

== Gallery ==
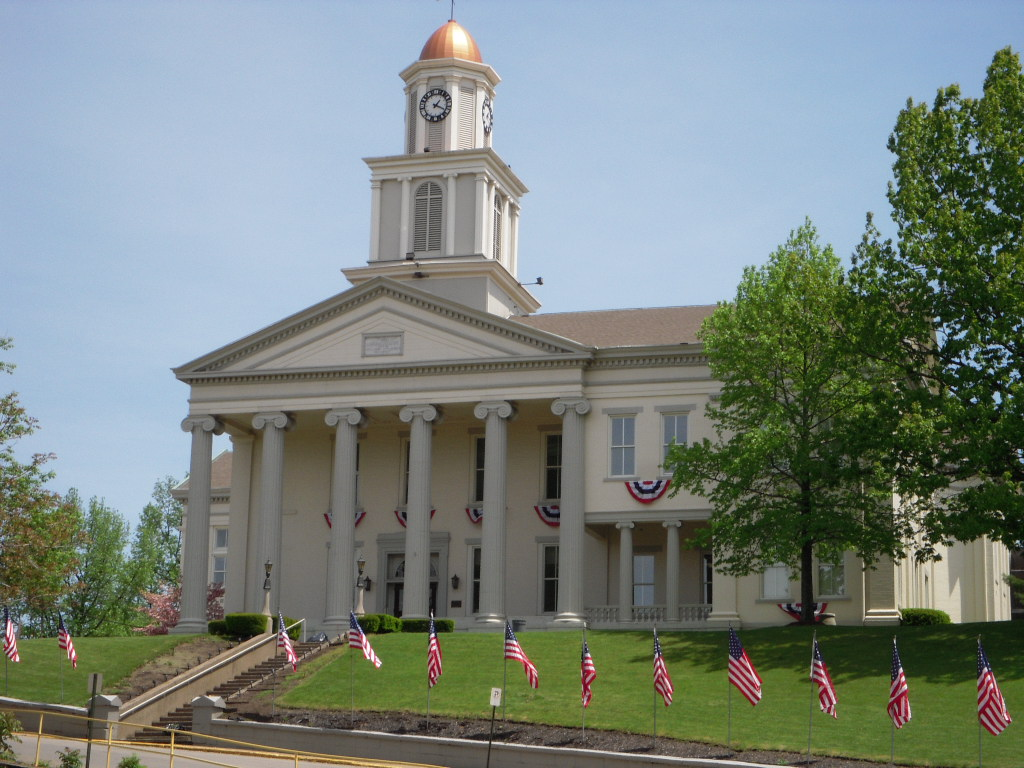
Lawrence County Courthouse, May 2008

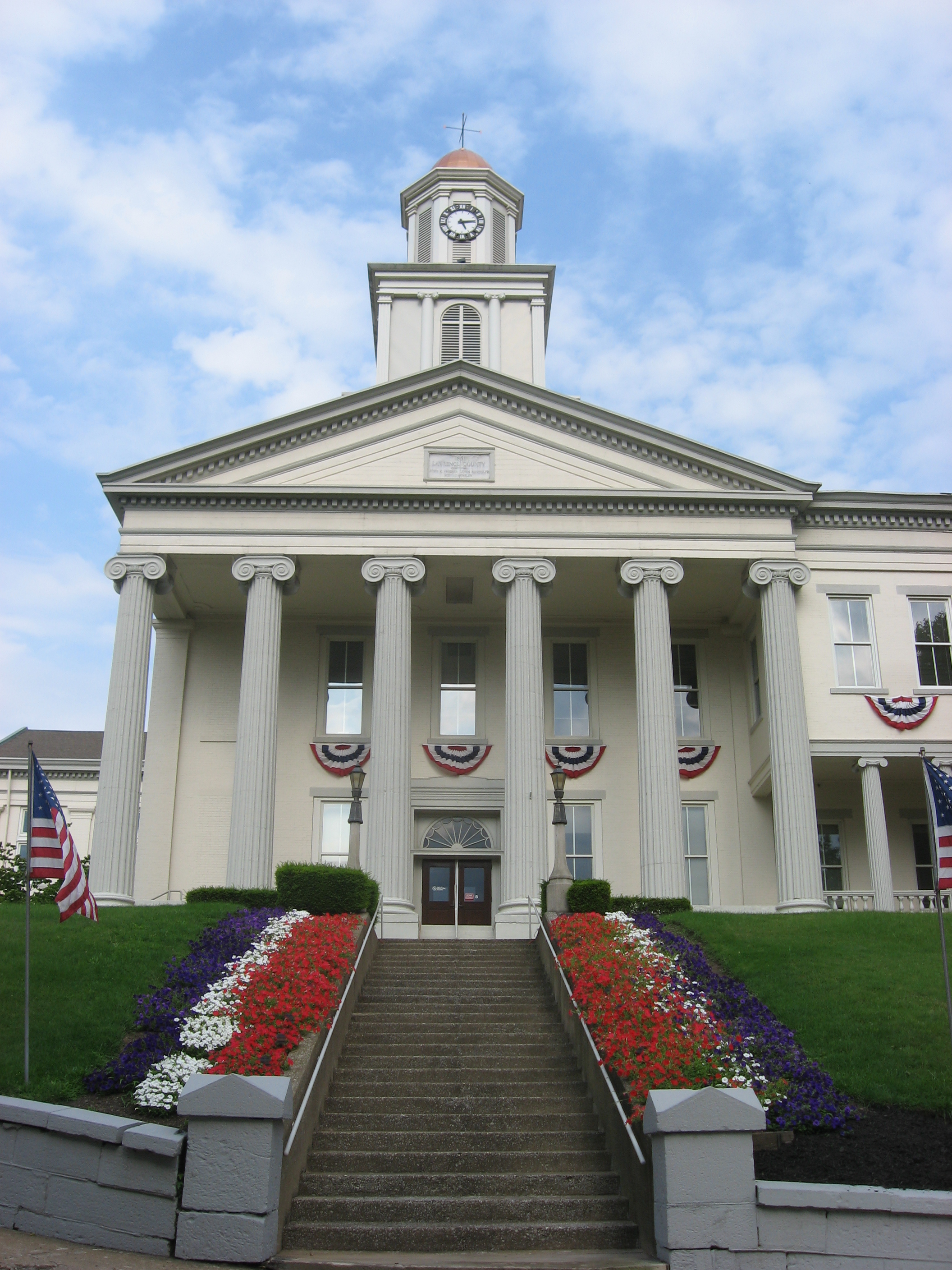
Lawrence County Courthouse, April 2009
