= John Brown House (Chambersburg, Pennsylvania) =

Historic house in Pennsylvania, United States

- U.S. National Register of Historic Places
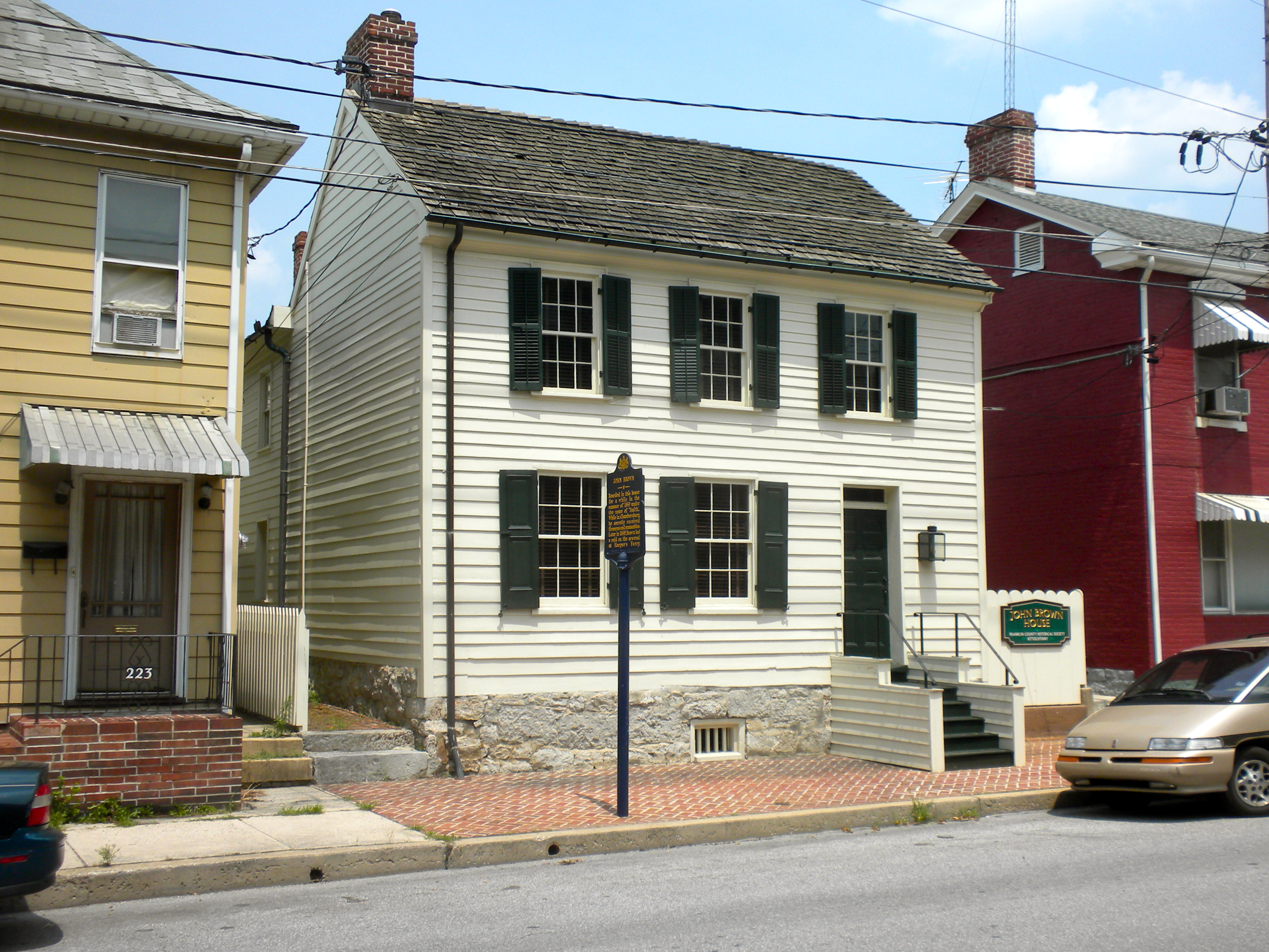
- John Brown House, July 2010

- Location within Pennsylvania Location within the United States
- Interactive map showing the location for John Brown House
- Location: 225 E. King St., Chambersburg, Pennsylvania
- Coordinates: 39°56′20″N 77°39′34″W
- Area: less than one acre
- Built: 1859
- NRHP reference No.: 70000548
- Added to NRHP: March 5, 1970

The John Brown House, also known as the Ritner Boarding House, is an historic home that is located in Chambersburg in Franklin County, Pennsylvania, United States.

Listed on the National Register of Historic Places in 1970, it is included in the Chambersburg Historic District.

== History and architectural features ==
This historic structure is a two-story, three-bay wide, clapboard-covered, hewn-log building. Abolitionist John Brown (1800–1859) stayed here from June until mid-October 1859, while receiving supplies and recruits for his raid on Harpers Ferry. Following the raid, four of Brown's followers returned to the house to be concealed. It is operated by the Franklin County Historical Society - Kittochtinny, as a historic house museum.

It was listed on the National Register of Historic Places in 1970. It is included in the Chambersburg Historic District. It has been designated as an authentic site in the National Underground Railroad Network to Freedom.

External videos
- Chambersburg historic sites, Franklin County Historical Society Includes images of John Brown House (starting at 2:50)
