= Pike County Courthouse (Pennsylvania) =

- U.S. National Register of Historic Places
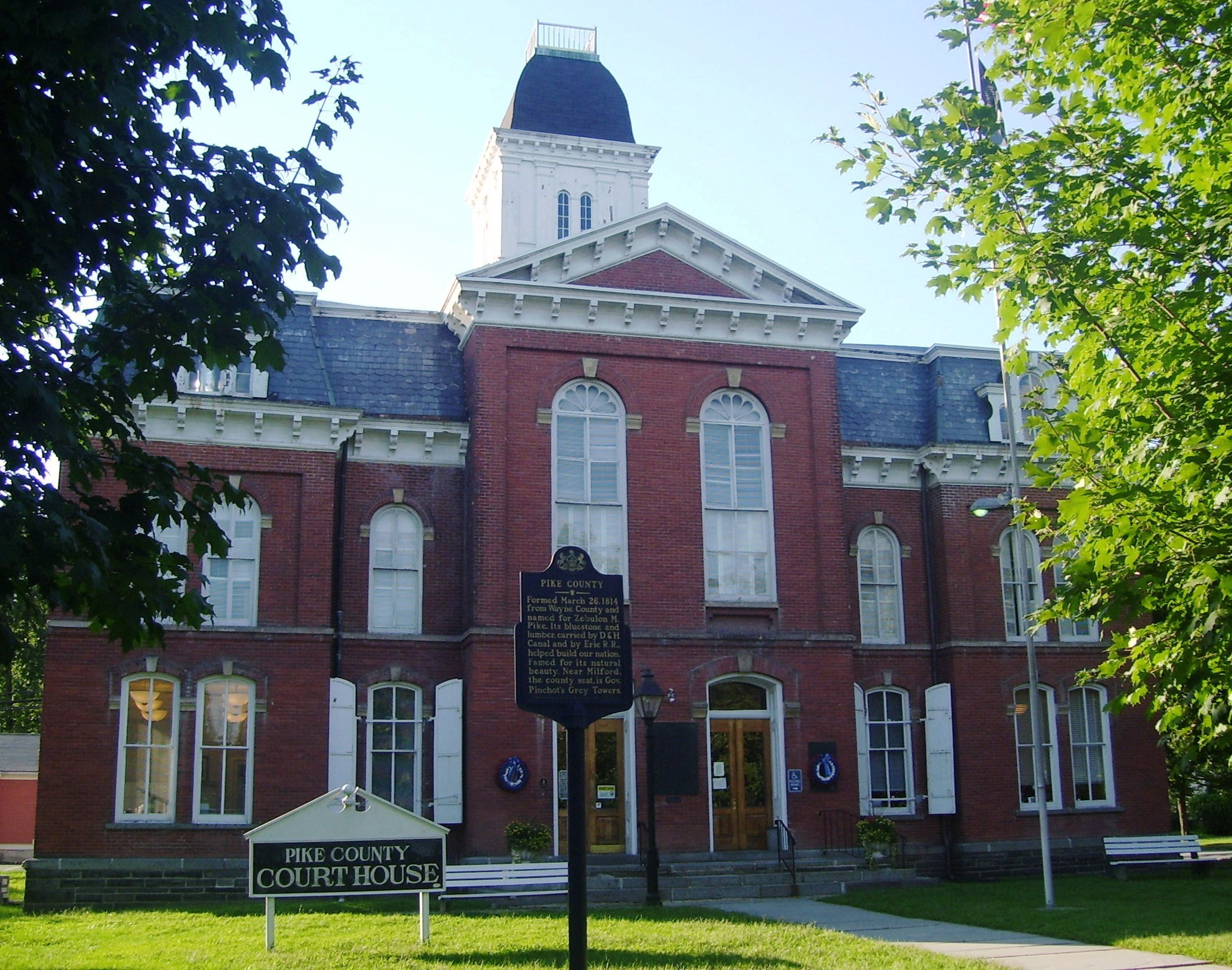
- Pike County Courthouse, August 2011

- Location within Pennsylvania Location within the United States
- Location: Broad and High Sts., Milford, Pennsylvania
- Coordinates: 41°19′28″N 74°48′4″W
- Area: 1 acre (0.40 ha)
- Built: 1873
- Built by: Brown, A.D.; Barton, George
- Architectural style: Second Empire
- NRHP reference No.: 79002340
- Added to NRHP: July 23, 1979

Pike County Courthouse is a historic county courthouse located at Milford, Pike County, Pennsylvania. It was built in 1873, and is a 2 1/2-story, eight bay by six bay, brick building in the Second Empire style. It features a projecting front section with pediment and a square cupola.

It was added to the National Register of Historic Places in 1979.

== See also ==
- List of state and county courthouses in Pennsylvania
