= Chambersburg Historic District =

Historic district in Pennsylvania, United States

- U.S. National Register of Historic Places
- U.S. Historic district
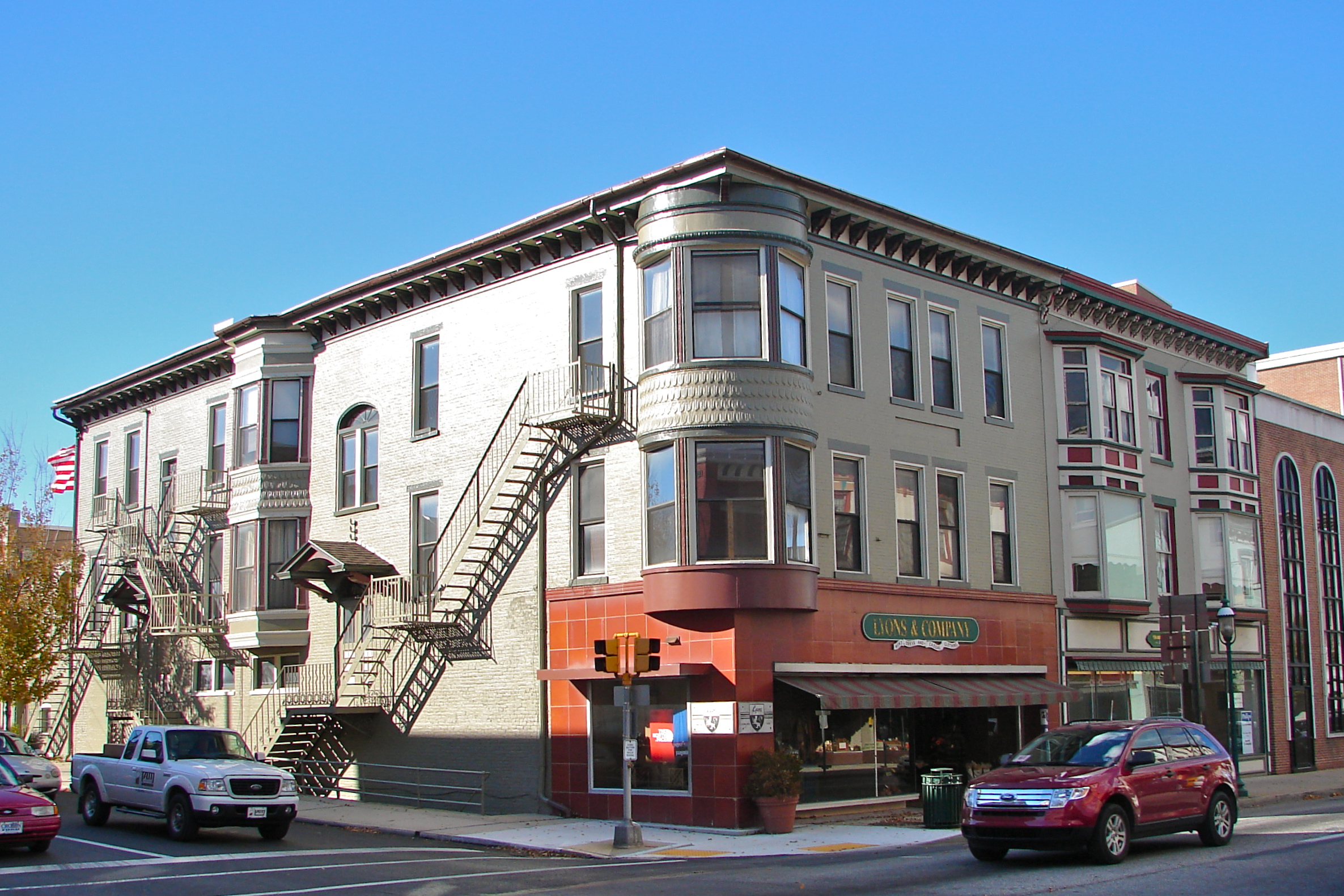
- 83 S. Main St., Chambersburg Historic District, October 2010

- Location within Pennsylvania Location within the United States
- Interactive map showing the location for Chambersburg Historic District
- Location: US 11 and US 30, Chambersburg, Pennsylvania
- Coordinates: 39°55′44″N 77°39′41″W
- Area: 232 acres (94 ha)
- Built: 1734
- Architectural style: Mid 19th Century Revival, Italianate, Georgian
- NRHP reference No.: 82003789
- Added to NRHP: August 26, 1982

Chambersburg Historic District is a national historic district centered on the Memorial Fountain and Square of Chambersburg in Franklin County, Pennsylvania. The district includes 159 contributing buildings in the central business district and immediately surrounding residential area of Chambersburg. The district has a number of notable examples of Georgian and Italianate style architecture. Notable buildings include the St. Paul United Methodist Church (1896), Professional Arts Building (c. 1914), Cumberland Valley National Bank, Cumberland Valley Railroad Station, First United Brethren Church (1899), firehouse, Presbyterian Church of the Falling Spring (1803), and the Suesserott House. Located in the district and separately listed are the Franklin County Jail, Franklin County Courthouse, John Brown House, Masonic Temple, Townhouse Row, and the Zion Reformed Church.

It was listed on the National Register of Historic Places in 1982.
