= Old Franklin County Jail (Chambersburg, Pennsylvania) =

- U.S. National Register of Historic Places
- Pennsylvania state historical marker
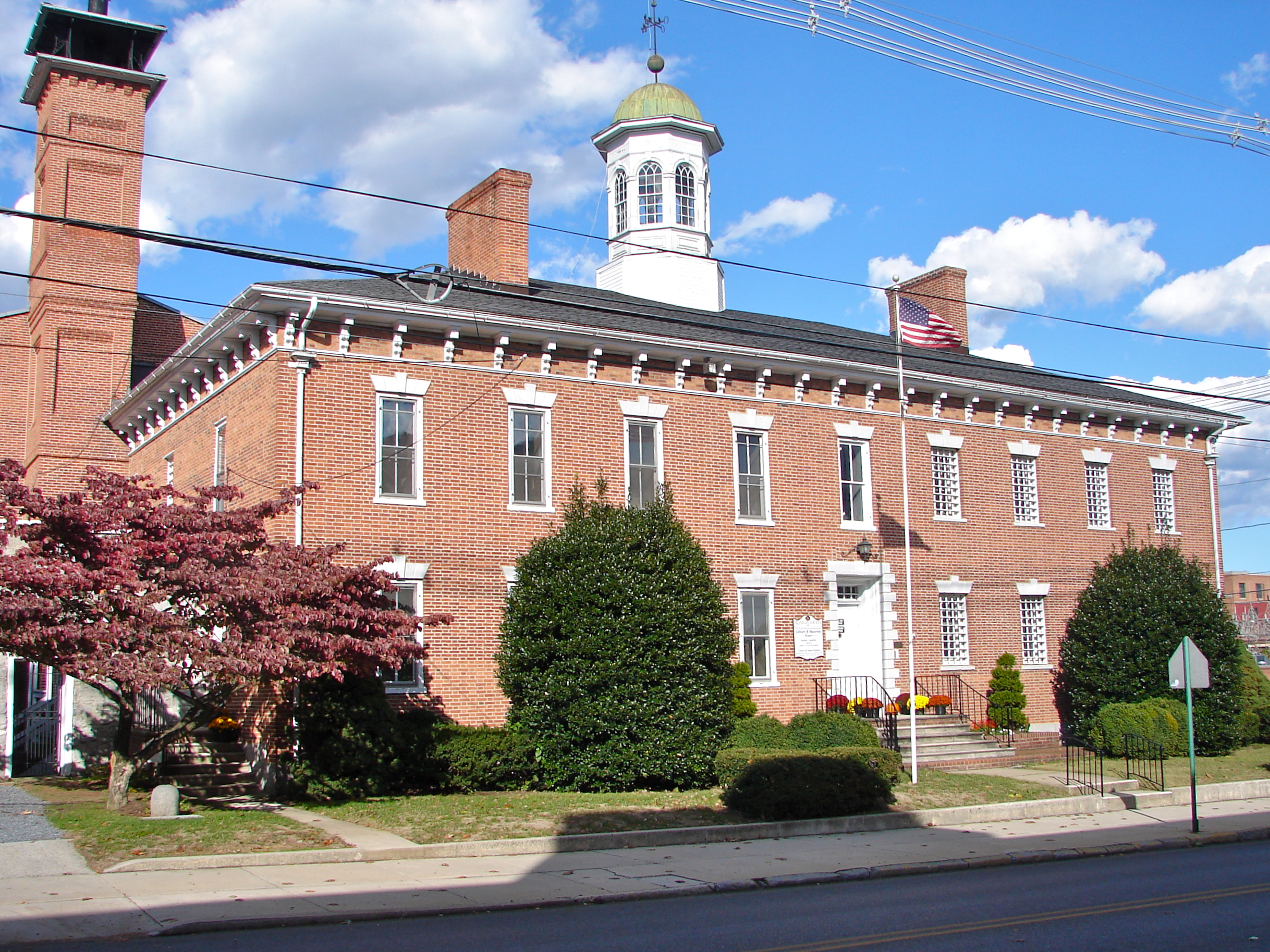
- Old Franklin County Jail, October 2010

- Location within Pennsylvania Location within the United States
- Location: NW corner of King and 2nd Sts., Chambersburg, Pennsylvania
- Coordinates: 39°56′20″N 77°39′35″W
- Area: less than one acre
- Built: 1818
- Architectural style: Georgian
- NRHP reference No.: 70000549

Significant dates
- Added to NRHP: January 21, 1970
- Designated PHMC: May 9, 1975

The Old Franklin County Jail is a historic jail located at Chambersburg in Franklin County, Pennsylvania. It was built in 1818, and is a two-story, brick building with a slate covered hipped roof topped by a cupola. The original building measures 84 feet wide by 48 feet deep. In 1880, a cell block was added. The jail yard is divided into two sections and surrounded by a 20-foot-high wall. At least five prisoners were hanged on the premises.

Now known as the Old Jail, the building houses a museum and genealogical library operated by the Franklin County Historical Society - Kittochtinny.

It was listed on the National Register of Historic Places in 1970. It is included in the Chambersburg Historic District.
