= Masonic Temple (Chambersburg, Pennsylvania) =

- U.S. National Register of Historic Places
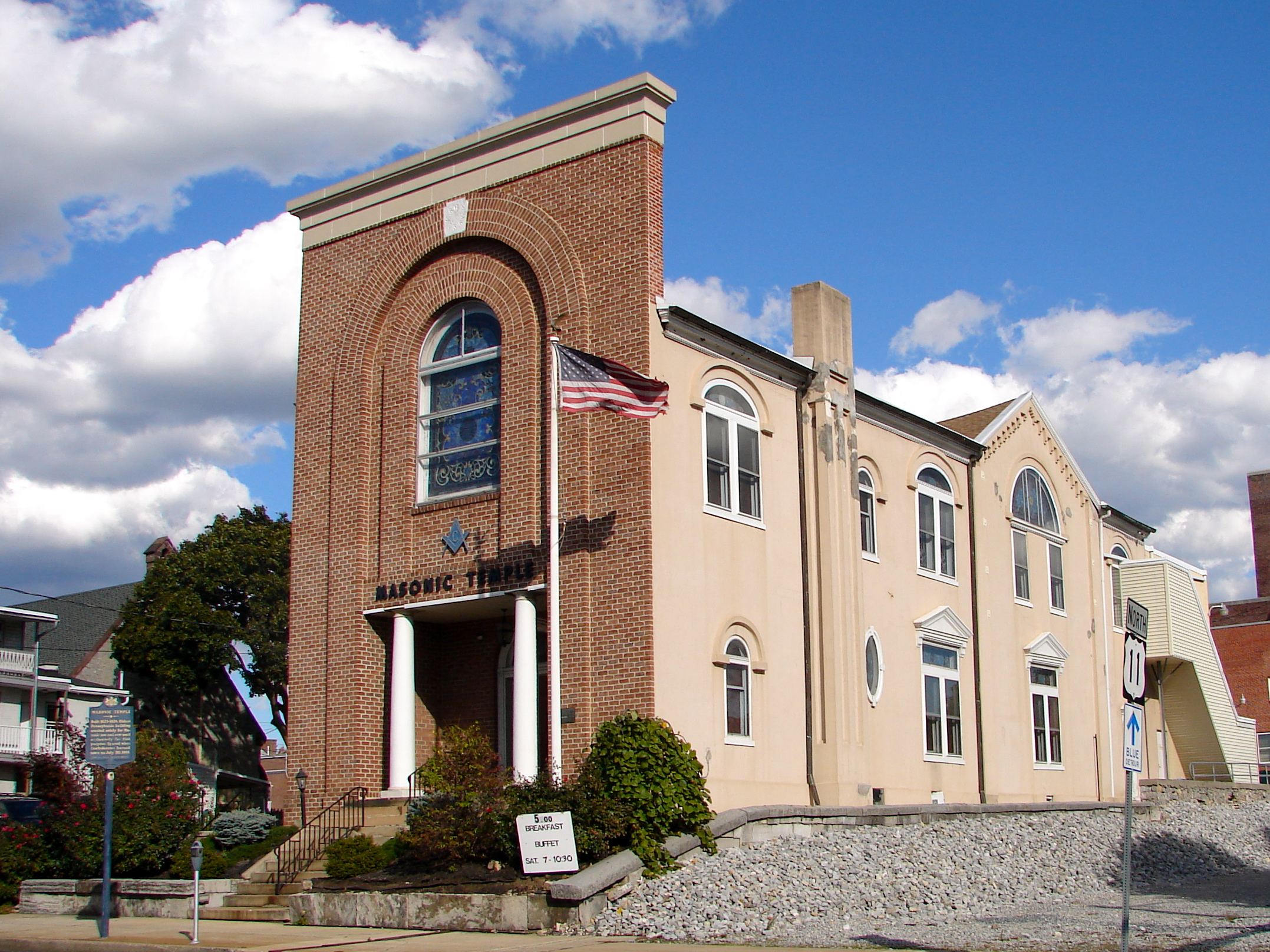
- Masonic Temple, October 2010

- Location within Pennsylvania Location within the United States
- Location: 74 S. 2nd St., Chambersburg, Pennsylvania
- Coordinates: 39°56′8″N 77°39′35″W
- Area: 0.5 acres (0.20 ha)
- Built: 1823
- Architect: Harry, Brother Silas; Buchart & Harn Associates
- Architectural style: Early Republic, Classical
- NRHP reference No.: 76001640
- Added to NRHP: June 18, 1976

The Masonic Temple is a historic Masonic Temple located at Chambersburg in Franklin County, Pennsylvania. It was built in 1823–1824, and is a two-story, brick building with a stucco veneer applied in 1905. An addition was built in 1966.

It was listed on the National Register of Historic Places in 1976. It is included in the Chambersburg Historic District.
