= Armstrong County Courthouse and Jail =

- U.S. National Register of Historic Places
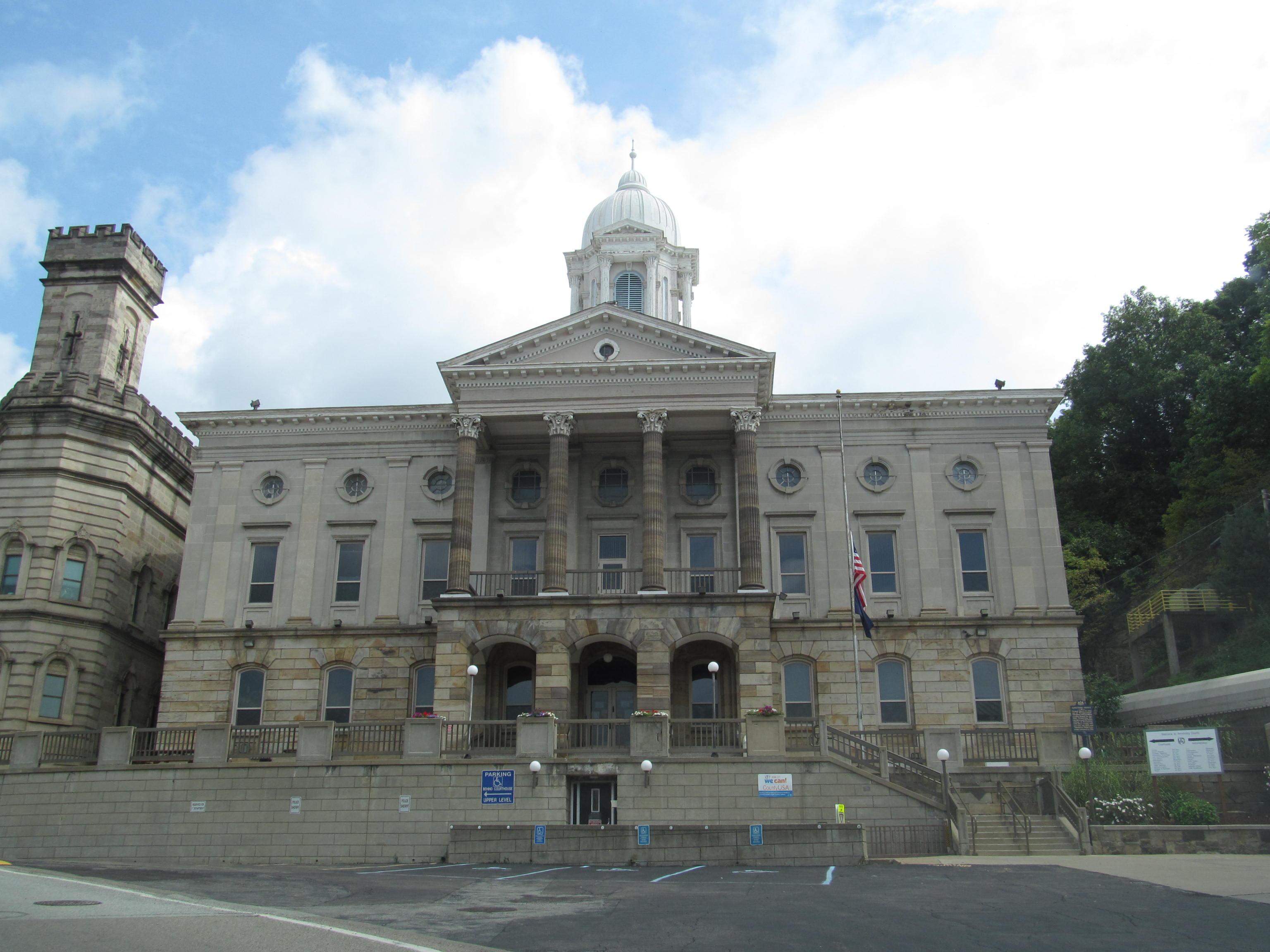
- Kittanning Courthouse, 2012

- Location within Pennsylvania Location within the United States
- Interactive map showing the location of Armstrong County Courthouse and Jail
- Location: E. Market St., Kittanning, Pennsylvania
- Coordinates: 40°48′59″N 79°31′0″W
- Area: 1 acre (0.40 ha)
- Built: 1860
- Built by: Hulings & Dickey
- Architectural style: Greek Revival
- NRHP reference No.: 81000526
- Added to NRHP: November 1, 1981

Armstrong County Courthouse and Jail is a historic courthouse complex located at Kittanning, Armstrong County, Pennsylvania. The courthouse was built between 1858 and 1860, and is a two-story, brick and stone building measuring 105 feet by 65 feet. It has a hipped roof topped by an octagonal cupola and bell. It features a portico with four Corinthian order columns in Greek Revival style. A three-story rear addition was built in 1951-1953. The jail building was built between 1870 and 1873. It is constructed of stone, brick, and iron, and measures 114 feet by 50 feet, with a 96 feet tall tower. The building once housed 24, 8 foot by 13 foot cells.

It was listed on the National Register of Historic Places in 1981.

== See also ==
- List of state and county courthouses in Pennsylvania
