= John Sutton Hall =

- U.S. National Register of Historic Places
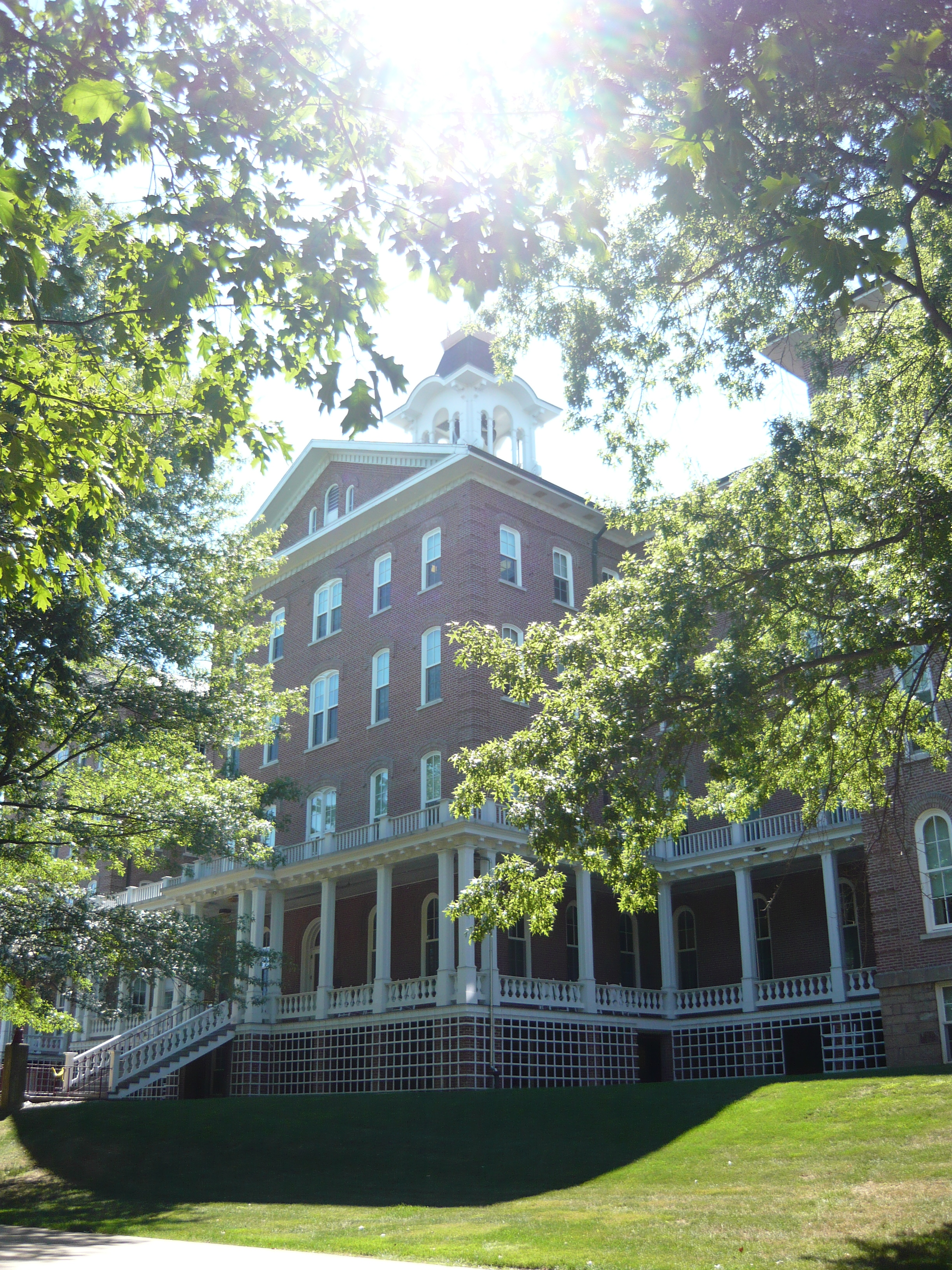

- Location within Pennsylvania
- Location: Indiana, Pennsylvania
- Coordinates: 40°37′3″N 79°9′32″W
- Area: 142,500 square feet (13,240 m^{2})
- Built: 1873
- Architect: James W. Drum; Haigh Voris & Gregg Co
- Architectural style: Italianate
- NRHP reference No.: 75001643
- Added to NRHP: September 17, 1975

John Sutton Hall is the Old Main building of Indiana University of Pennsylvania. Constructed between 1873 and 1875, the building was the first constructed for the Indiana Normal School. In 1903, the building was named after John Sutton, the first president of the school's board of trustees.

Sutton Hall was added to the National Register of Historic Places in 1975.

== History ==
John Sutton, a merchant from Indiana, Pennsylvania, purchased land to establish a normal school to train women to become teachers. In 1873, construction of the building began. The Main Building was designed by James W. Drum, who also designed the original Indiana County Courthouse and the St. Bernard's Roman Catholic Church. Construction was completed in 1875 with a final cost of $141,115, including furnishings. In the school's early years the building functioned as the entire school, containing classrooms, dormitories, an infirmary, a dining hall, and a gymnasium. In 1903, the building was officially named after Sutton. That same year, the north and south wings were extended to the west, and Thomas Sutton Dining Hall was added adjacent to the main building. In 1920, the Commonwealth of Pennsylvania assumed control of the school. The name was changed to Indiana (PA) State Teacher's College in 1927. It became Indiana State College in 1959. The college achieved university status in 1965 and became Indiana University of Pennsylvania. As more buildings at the school were constructed, activities were decentralized from Sutton Hall.

Sutton Hall was originally scheduled for renovations in the 1970s, but the Pennsylvania Department of Education advised that available funds would be insufficient to support the renovation and the $16 million library the university was planning. The decision to demolish the building was made in 1974. The committee to Save John Sutton Hall was organized and funded a feasibility study by Landmarks Planning, Inc. of Pittsburgh, who specialized in the restoration of old buildings. The study concluded that the building could be restored and continue to benefit the university economically. On September 19, 1975, the president of the board of trustees received a letter from the director of the Office of Historic Preservation stating that Sutton Hall had been included on the National Register of Historic Places on September 17. Inclusion on the Register made grants available for the renovation project. Just weeks later on October 3, the board of trustees unanimously voted to preserve Sutton Hall.

== Gallery ==
Early postcard image

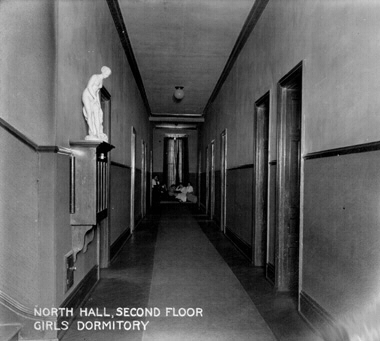
Second floor girls dormitory, 1916

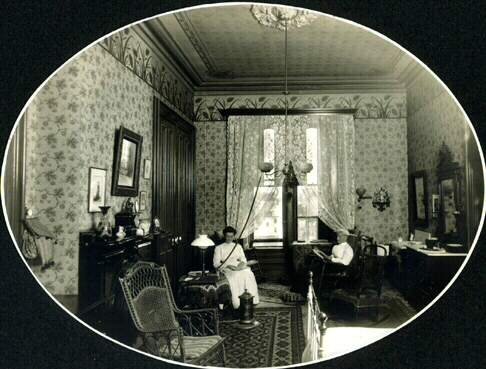
Faculty quarters, circa 1900

== Works ==
- A Guidebook to John Sutton Hall. Indiana University of Pennsylvania
- Busovicki, John F. Indiana County. Arcadia Publishing, 2003. ISBN 0-7385-1181-1
- John Sutton Hall — A Victorian Restoration. Foundation for Indiana University of Pennsylvania
