= Memorial Fountain and Statue =

- U.S. National Register of Historic Places
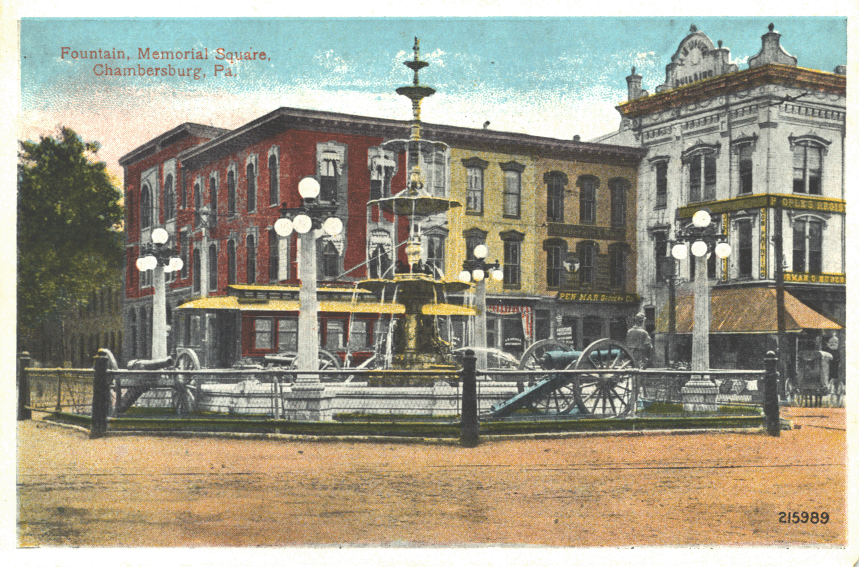
- Postcard of Fountain, Memorial Square, c. 1921

- Location within Pennsylvania Location within the United States
- Location: Memorial Sq., Chambersburg, Pennsylvania
- Coordinates: 39°56′15″N 77°39′43″W
- Area: 0.2 acres (0.081 ha)
- Built: 1878
- Built by: Fiske, J.W.
- NRHP reference No.: 78002400
- Added to NRHP: May 19, 1978

The Memorial Fountain and Statue are an historic fountain and statue that are located in Memorial Square in Chambersburg, Franklin County, Pennsylvania.

== History and notable features ==
Installed in 1878 and built of cast iron, the fountain basin is hexagonal and thirty feet in diameter. It features eight flower vases positioned around it. The central shaft is twenty-six feet high and topped by a turned finial. At the base of the shaft are four cherubs riding dolphins. Water projects from each dolphin's mouth. The statue is of a uniformed soldier with rifle, standing six feet tall.

These objects were listed on the National Register of Historic Places in 1978 and are included in the Chambersburg Historic District.

== Gallery ==
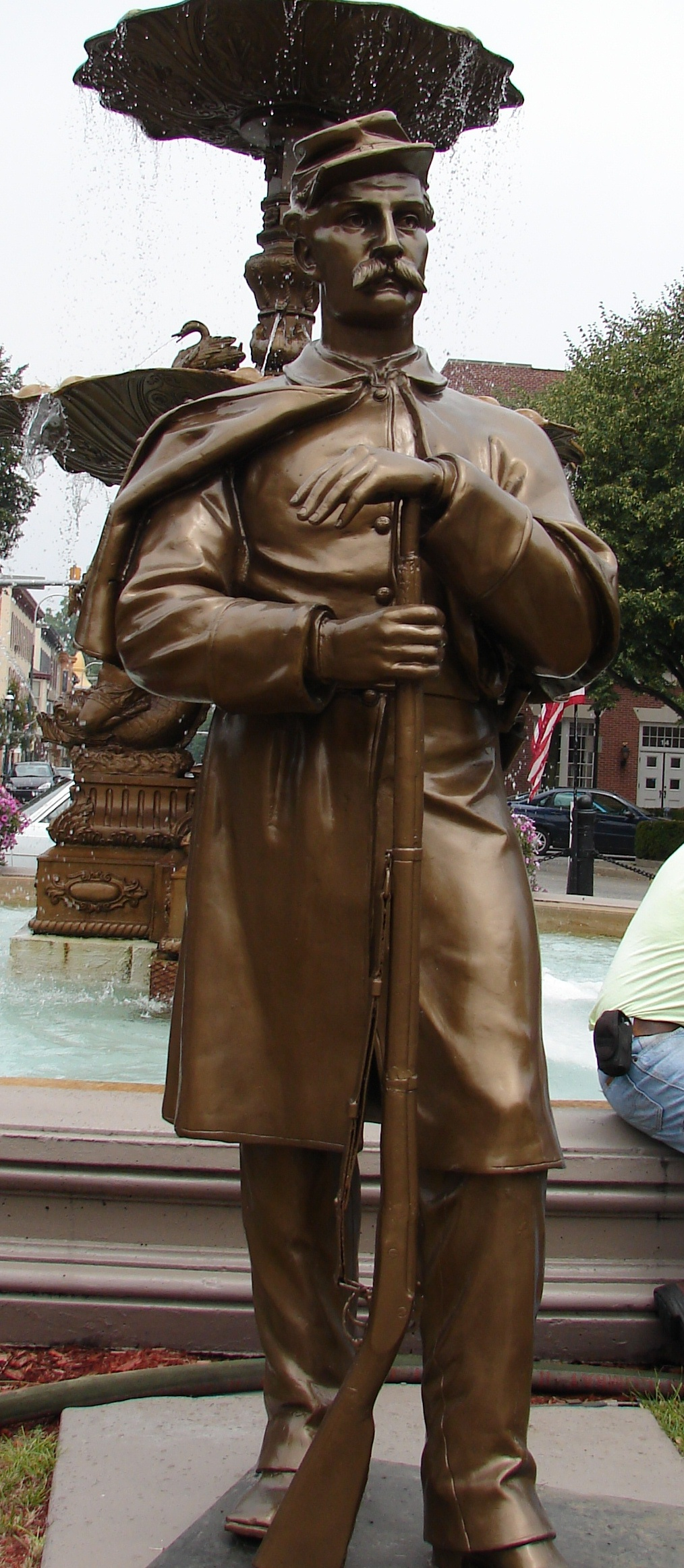
Statue of Union soldier facing south to ward off Confederates, 1878
