= James W. Drum =

American architect

James W. Drum (died May 5, 1886, in Pittsburgh, Pennsylvania) was an American architect practicing from Punxsutawney, Pennsylvania who designed the main building, now John Sutton Hall, of the Indiana Normal School, now Indiana University of Pennsylvania, in Indiana, Pennsylvania. He also designed several county courthouses: the second Indiana County Courthouse, in what he termed the "Modern Renaissance" style, and the Jefferson County Courthouse in Brookville, both in 1869, His St. Bernard's Roman Catholic Church is also in Indiana, Pennsylvania, where Drum designed the Wilson, Sutton & Company Store on Philadelphia Street, and the First Methodist Episcopal Church at the comer of South Seventh Street and Church Street.

Sutton Hall, the Courthouse and the former St. Bernard's Church are all on the National Register of Historic Places.
