= Harbaugh =

Harbaugh is a surname which is the Americanized form of the German name Harbach. Notable people with the surname include:

- A. G. Harbaugh (1872–1934), American college football coach, assayer, and chemist
- Carl Harbaugh (c. 1886–1960), American film actor, screenwriter, and director
- Greg Harbaugh Jr. (born 1986), American football coach
- Gregory J. Harbaugh (born 1956), American astronaut
- Henry Harbaugh (1817–1867), Pennsylvania Dutch clergyman and writer
- Jack Harbaugh (born 1939), American football coach
  - John Harbaugh (born 1962), American football coach, Jack's older son
  - Jim Harbaugh (born 1963), American football coach, Jack's younger son
    - Jay Harbaugh (born 1989), American football coach, Jim's son
- John W. Harbaugh (1926–2019), American geologist
- Ken Harbaugh (born 1973), American Navy pilot and nonprofit executive
- Simon Harbaugh (1873–1960), American golfer
- Thomas Chalmers Harbaugh (1849–1924) American poet and novelist

== See also ==
- Harbaugh's Reformed Church
