= Hobaugh =

Hobaugh is a surname. Notable people with the surname include:

- Charles O. Hobaugh (born 1961), American astronaut
- Ed Hobaugh (born 1934), American baseball player

== See also ==
- Harbaugh
