= Historical Society of Frankford =

Historical society and museum in Philadelphia

Coordinates: 40.0157°N 75.0872°W

The Historical Society of Frankford is a historical society and museum located in Philadelphia, Pennsylvania. A 501(c)(3) organization, it is located in the Frankford neighborhood of Northeast Philadelphia. It was a founding member of the Pennsylvania Federation of Historical Societies.

The society was organized in 1905, and chartered in 1920, for the purpose of promoting historical study, especially the social history and traditions of Frankford and vicinity. Purchases are made with the general society fund; outright gifts only are acceptable. The society is housed in a 2 1/2-story, fireproof, stone, brick, and steel building, constructed in 1930. Space of manuscripts is adequate.

It has EIN 23-6296560 as a 501(c)(3) Public Charity; in 2013 it claimed total assets of $273,586.

== Holdings ==
The materials relate entirely to the Frankford section of Philadelphia and include: Deeds, leases, grants, releases, etc., 1681-1887; aldermen's court dockets, accounts, and school records, 1824-1925; account books of various business enterprises, including the Oxford-Provident Building and Loan Association, the earliest in the United States, 1831-1863; fire companies, 1793-1871; Philanthropic Society and Lyceum records; Civil War records; historical sketches; genealogical material relating to local families; and miscellaneous personal and business correspondence.

There are 250 volumes, plus 1,000 pieces, all of which are arranged: Deeds, alphabetically by name of grantor, and chronologically thereunder; general material, alphabetically by name of author, and chronologically thereunder. Accessions are cataloged, and 1,250 cards (three by five) catalog the pieces.

Material is available to accredited researchers upon application to the secretary or other officer of the society." — Papers Read Before the Society, III, No. 5 (1937), Smedley Caroline W.

== Television ==
The Keno brothers (identical twins Leigh and Leslie) of Antiques Roadshow paid a visit to the Historical Society of Frankford at 1507 Orthodox St. “That day was incredible,” Leigh Keno recalled of the visit to the Historical Society during a recent phone interview with the Northeast Times. “We could’ve done ten days there. We just scratched the surface of the collection during our visit. Every drawer we opened had something to explore.” During the taping last October, the Kenos came across a daguerreotype (a type of photograph from the 1850s) in the Frankford collection that they believed had value.

== See also ==
- List of historical societies in Pennsylvania

== Publications ==
- Frankford (Images of America) Frankford (Images of America)
- Brian H. Harris (2005). Frankford (Images of America). Arcadia Publishing. ISBN 0-7385-3786-1.
