= Joseph J. Oller House =

Historic house in Pennsylvania, United States

- U.S. National Register of Historic Places
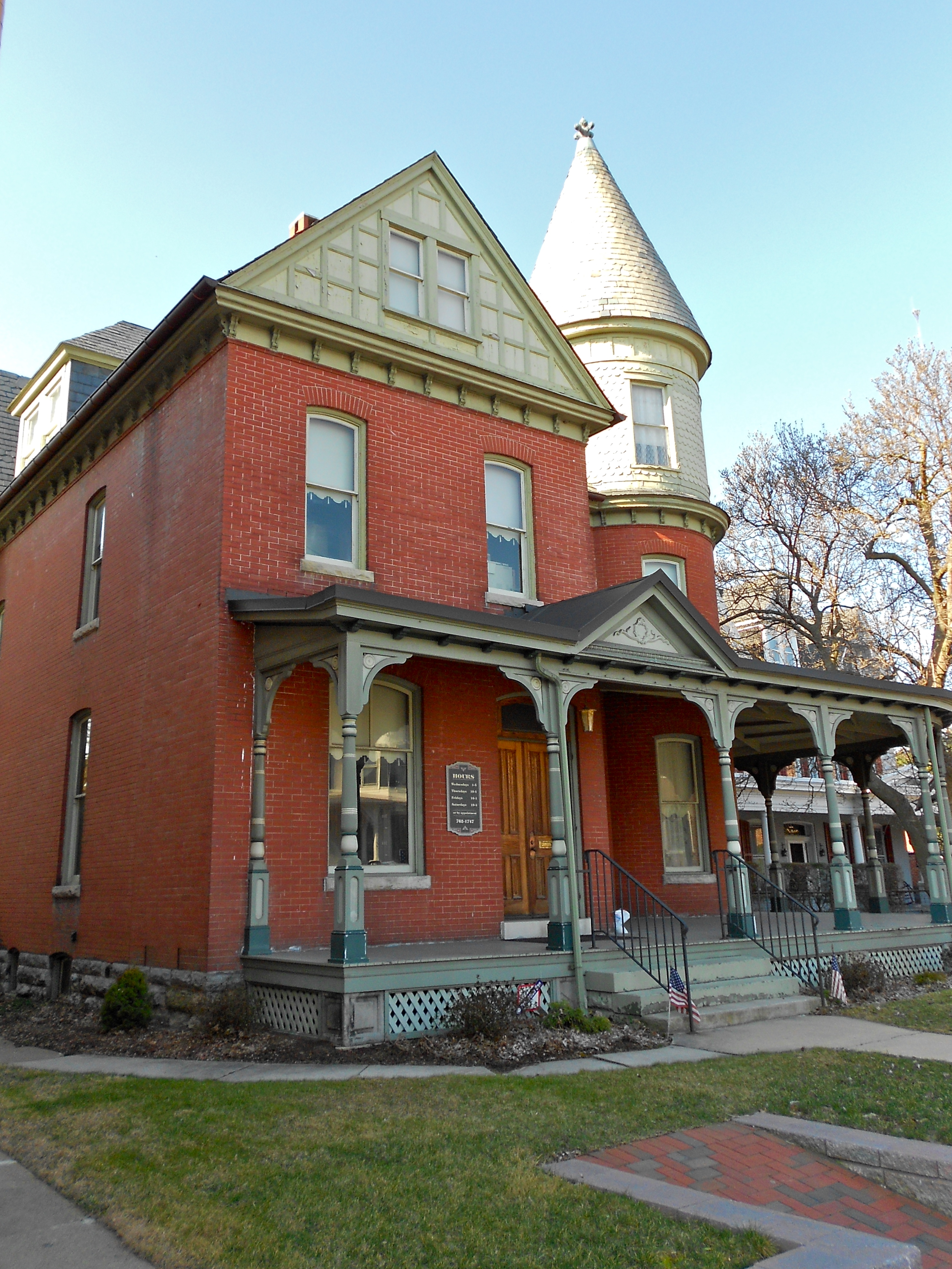
- Joseph J. Oller House, February 2012

- Location within Pennsylvania Location within the United States
- Location: 138 W. Main St., Waynesboro, Pennsylvania
- Coordinates: 39°45′26″N 77°34′53″W
- Area: less than one acre
- Built: 1891-1892, 1910
- Built by: Good, A.M., & Brothers
- Architect: Cook, D. F.
- Architectural style: Queen Anne
- NRHP reference No.: 96000707
- Added to NRHP: June 28, 1996

The Joseph J. Oller House is an American historic home that is located in Waynesboro in Franklin County, Pennsylvania.

Now the headquarters of the Waynesboro Historical Society, this property was listed on the National Register of Historic Places in 1996.

== History and architectural features ==
Built between 1891 and 1892, this historic structure is a two-and-one-half-story, seventeen-room, brick dwelling that was designed in the Queen Anne style. A two-story addition was built in 1910. The house features a multi-gabled slate roof and a projecting round bay topped by a tower and conical roof. Also located on the property is a one-story, wood-frame carriage house and two-story, wood-frame stable.

It was listed on the National Register of Historic Places in 1996.
