= Moravian Historical Society =

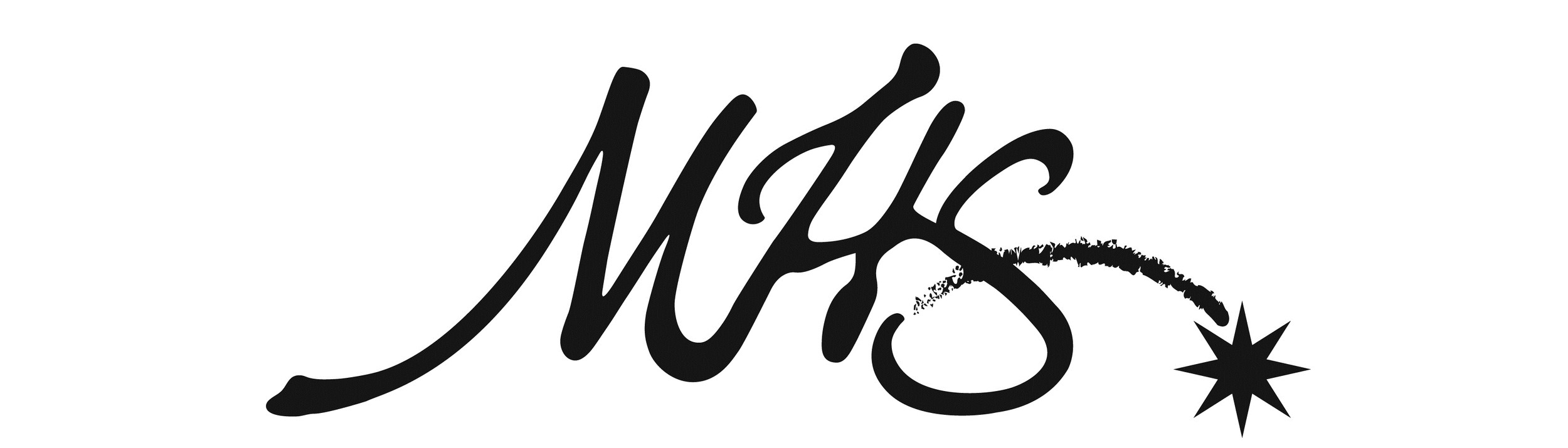
- Abbreviation: MHS
- Formation: 1857
- Founded at: Nazareth, Pennsylvania
- Type: Historical Society
- Legal status: Non-profit
- Headquarters: Nazareth, Pennsylvania
- Location: 214 East Center Street, Nazareth, Pennsylvania
- Region served: Mid Atlantic, North America
- Website: https://www.moravianhistory.org/

The Moravian Historical Society in Nazareth, Pennsylvania, was founded in 1857. Its mission is to preserve, interpret, and celebrate the rich culture of the Moravians. It is the third oldest historical society in the Commonwealth of Pennsylvania. The Moravian Historical Society is located in the 1740-1743 Whitefield House in downtown Nazareth.

The Moravian Historical Society collects objects relating to Moravian history, provides research assistance, publishes, and offers lectures, programs, events, and activities for all ages and levels of interest.

It has EIN 24-6025569 as a 501(c)(3) Public Charity; in 2025 it claimed total revenue of $249,821 and total assets of $3,714,428.

== Site ==
The Moravian Historical Society is located on a three-acre historic site in Nazareth, PA. It maintains two historic buildings, the 1740-1743 Whitefield House and the 1740 Gray Cottage, the oldest surviving Moravian structure in North America.

=== History of the Site ===
In 1740, a Moravian group from Savannah, Georgia was invited by British cleric George Whitefield to build a school on his 5000-acre Nazareth tract, which he had purchased from William Allen that same year.

On May 7, 1740, Moravians arrived on the Nazareth tract, and began work on the Stone House. Doctrinal differences between Whitefield and the Moravians forced the Moravians to abandon the project. In need of a place to settle, the Moravians purchased 500 acres of land from the prominent Pennsylvanian William Allen. On this tract, Moravians began building a new settlement, which would be named Bethlehem. They also purchased the 5,000-acre Nazareth tract from Whitefield. They soon returned and the large Stone House was completed in 1743.

The town of Nazareth was laid out in 1771 several blocks to the west. The First House was demolished in 1864, but the Whitefield House and Gray Cottage still stand. The buildings were added to the National Register of Historic Places on May 1, 1980.

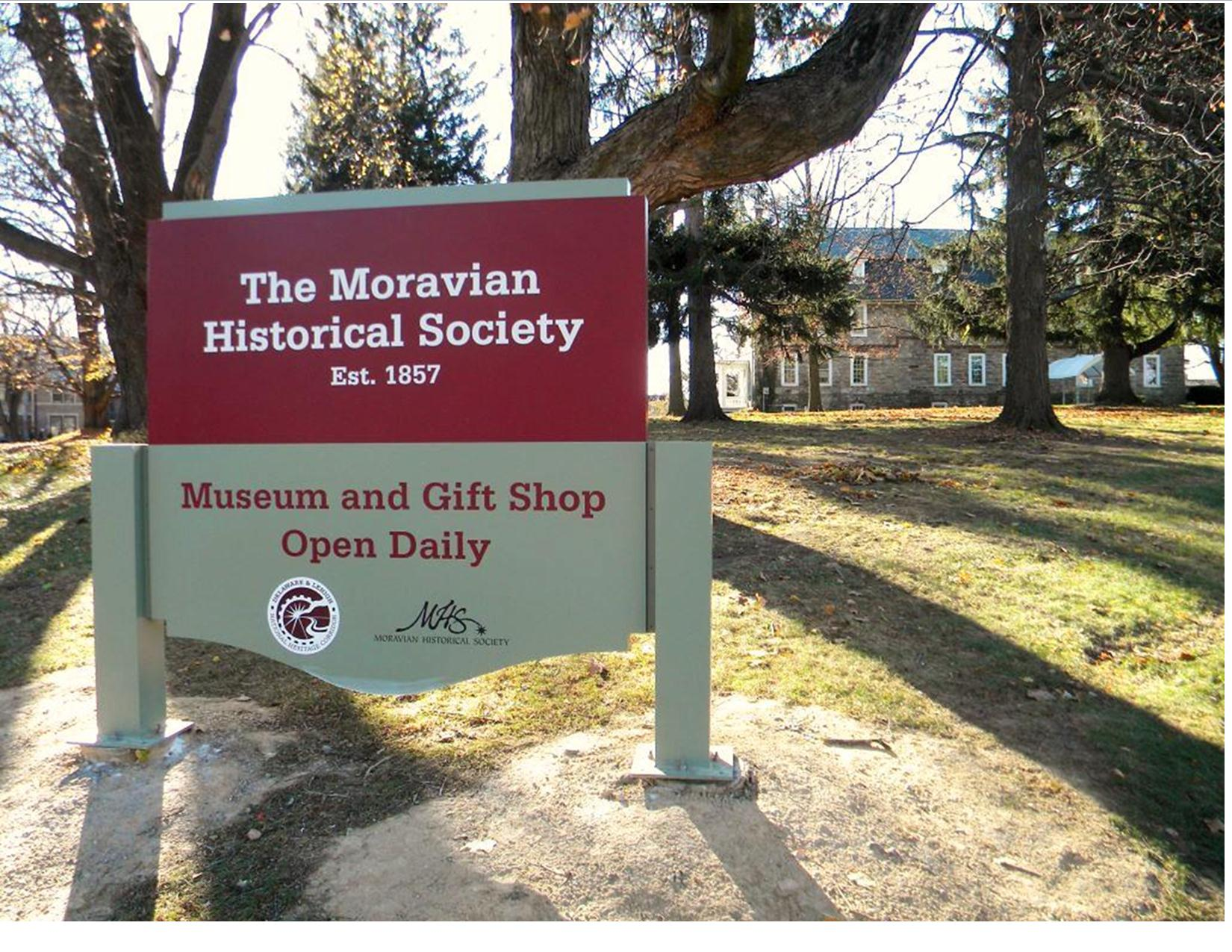
The marker for the Moravian Historical Society

=== Whitefield House ===
Construction on the Whitefield House started in 1740 and completed in 1743. It was originally used to house 33 married couples arriving from England. Through the years, the Whitefield House operated as a place of worship, girls’ boarding school, nursery, the Moravian Theological Seminary, and apartments for furloughed missionaries. Today, the building houses the Museum of the Moravian Historical Society as well as administrative offices, and a Museum shop. The museum runs a series of permanent and changing exhibitions about the history and culture of the Moravians and their contributions to history.

=== Gray Cottage ===
The Gray Cottage was constructed in October 1740 by the Moravians as protection from the harsh winter weather ahead. It is an oak log structure, and was originally called the “Old Block House” from the German word Block, meaning “log.” From 1743 to 1745, the building was used as a boys’ school. It has also been used as a girls’ school, a home for widows, a nursery, and a private residence. It is the oldest surviving Moravian building in North America.

=== First House ===
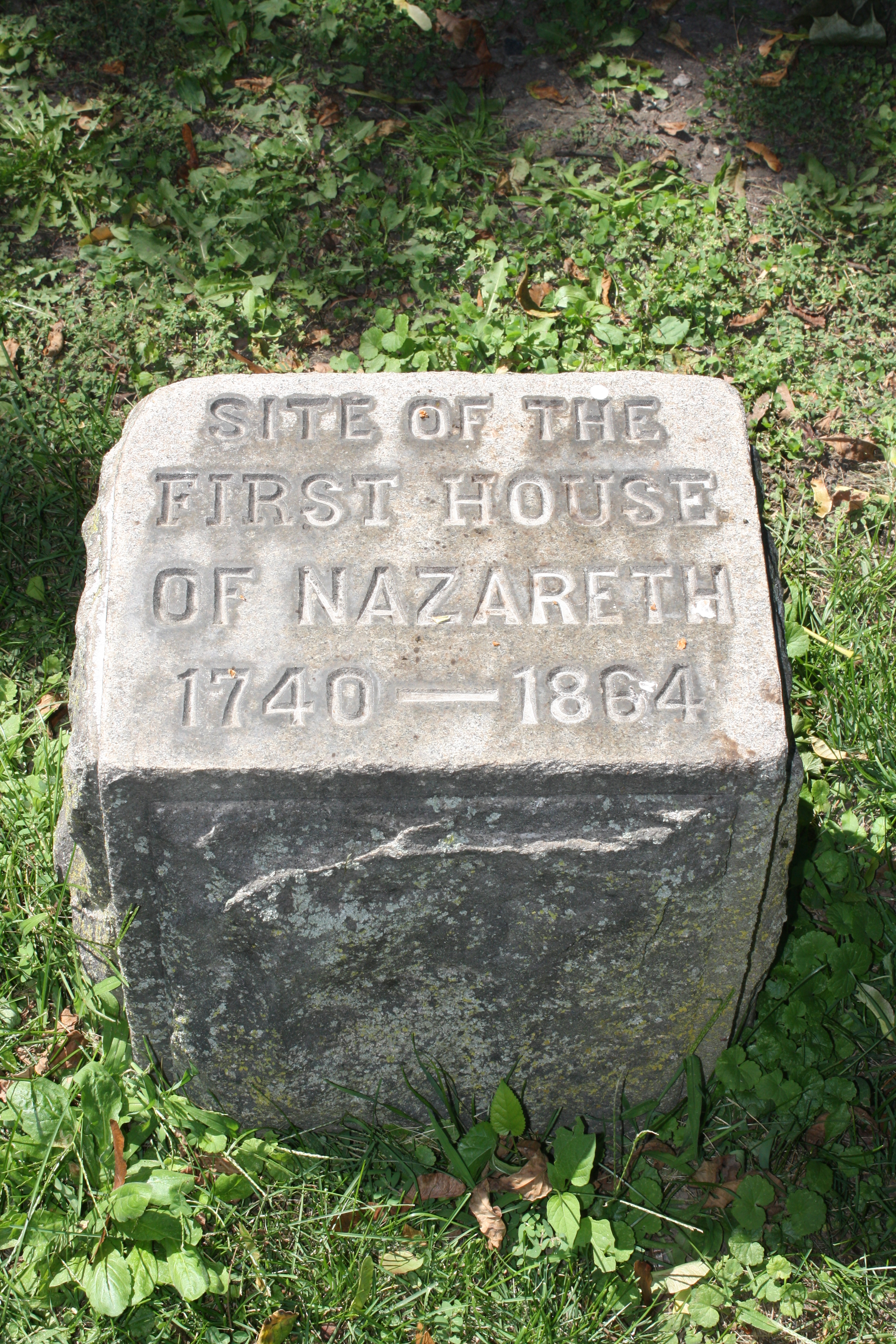
The marker designating the First House of Nazareth

Constructed in June 1740, the First House sheltered Moravians during the construction of the Whitefield House. It was approximately 30’ wide by 20’ deep, and stood two and one half stories tall. It was demolished in 1864, but the foundation was discovered by archaeologists in September 2014 in the area between the Whitefield House and the Gray Cottage. Several artifacts including redware pottery and a brass horse bell were also discovered. A small stone marker stands on this site.

== Monuments ==
The Moravian Historical Society has placed several markers at locations of American Moravian historical significance:

- The First House of Nazareth marker: A small stone marker on the Ephrata Tract indicating the location of Nazareth's First House, which was demolished in 1864.
- Meniolagomeka in Monroe County (near Kunkletown), PA: Dedicated on October 22, 1901, at the former site of the Delaware Native American town of Meniolagomeka. Several Moravian missionaries labored here from 1752 to 1755.
- Wechquetank in Monroe County (near Gilbert), PA: Dedicated on May 31, 1907, at the former site of the Delaware village of Wechquetank, which means willow tree in the Delaware language. The site was a Moravian mission from 1750 to 1756 and 1760–1763.
- The Rose Inn in Northampton County (Upper Nazareth), PA: Built in 1752 by the Moravians; it was used as housing for refugees from 1755 to 1756. It formally closed in 1772, and was demolished in 1858. A stone marker sits on the original site near a barn made partially from wood of the original inn.
- Shekomeko in Dutchess County (near Pine Plains), NY: Dedicated to the Mahican Native American village of Shekomeko, the first Native Christian congregation in America. Moravian missionaries worked there from 1740 to 1746, until new legislation expelled them from the area. The original monument was dedicated at the site of missionary Gottlieb Buettner's grave at Shekomeko on October 5, 1859, and rededicated as its current, more accessible site on June 22, 1926.
- Gnadenhuetten in Lehighton, Carbon County, PA: Dedicated to the mission at the village of Gnadenhuetten. The village was destroyed in the Gnadenhütten massacre during the French and Indian War on Nov. 24, 1755.
- Dansbury Mission in Monroe County (Stroudsburg), PA: Dedicated on June 25, 1931, to the Moravian mission that began in 1747, and was destroyed during the French and Indian War in 1755.
- Friedenshuetten in Bradford County (near Wyalusing), PA: Dedicated on June 15, 1871, at the former Native American mission village of Wyalusing, 1763–1772.
- Gnadensee (Indian Lake) in Litchfield County (near Sharon), CT: Dedicated on October 6, 1859, at Wechquanach near Shekomeko overlooking the Gnadensee. Missionary David Bruce's body was carried over the Gnadensee to Wechquanach in 1749.

== Collections ==
The Whitefield House Museum's collection contains over 20,000 Moravian objects, which are featured in permanent and changing exhibits. Highlights from the collections include:

- 23 oil paintings by John Valentine Haidt (1700-1780), the first artist in Colonial America to portray chiefly religious topics,
- A 1776 pipe organ made by David Tannenberg, the most important organ-builder of his time,
- The Antes violin: the earliest-known violin made in the American Colonies,
- A cocklestove made prior to 1775,
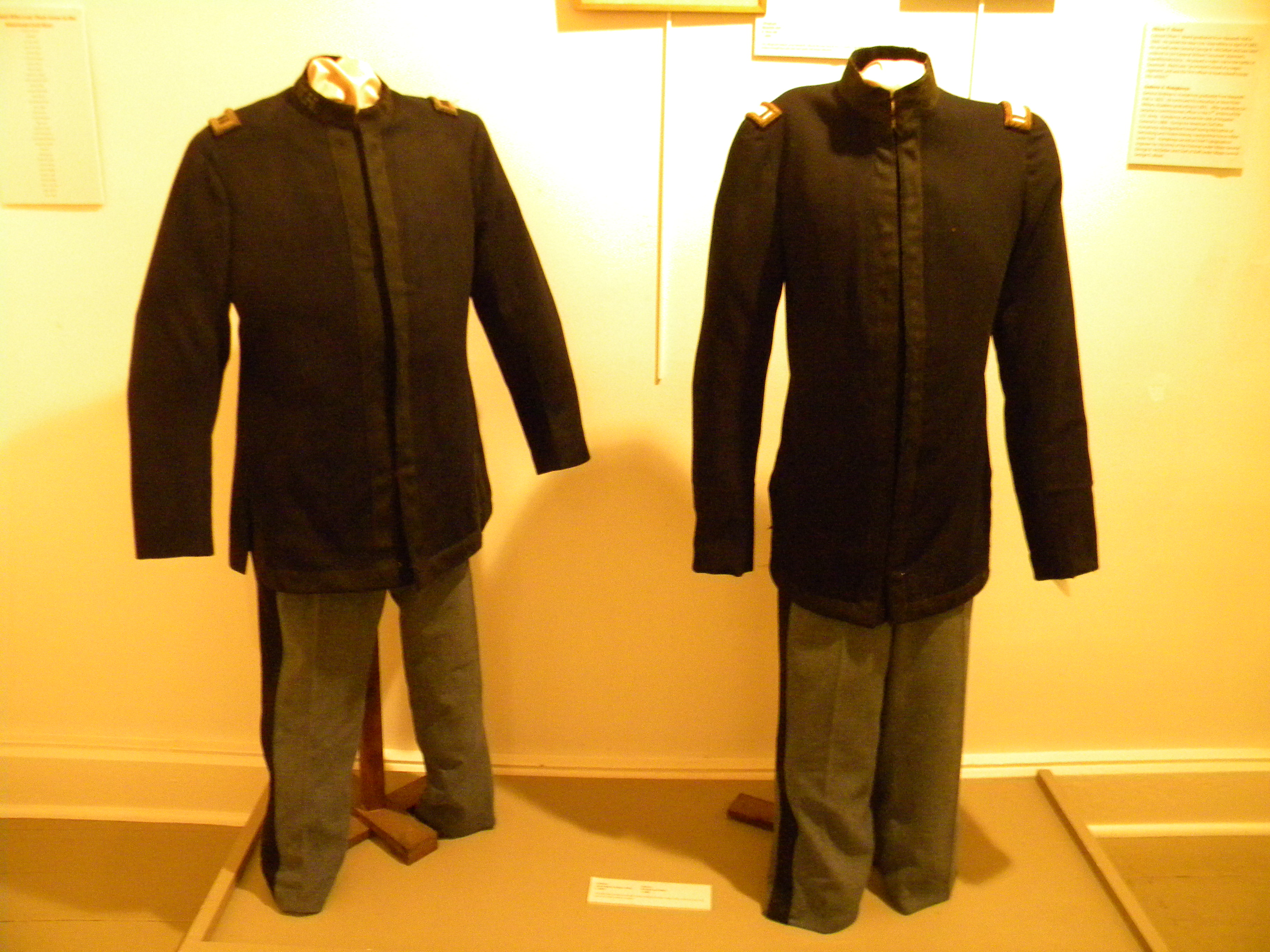
- The 2014 Civil War history exhibit inside the Moravian Historical Society Museum.
  Rare first editions of books written by John Amos Comenius, the "Father of Modern Education."

The museum also contains a large collection of Moravian mission artifacts from six continents, as well as various textiles, household goods, and Native American artifacts.

The entire collection is available to researchers by appointment.

The museum operates from 1-4 pm, seven days a week except for major holidays including Thanksgiving, Christmas, and Easter.

== Publications ==
The Moravian Historical Society publishes various guides and periodicals, including:

- Transactions of the Moravian Historical Society-a publication that ran in volumes from 1868 to 2000.
- Journal of Moravian History-a biannual publication and expanded version of Transactions, created in 2006 in collaboration with the Moravian Archives and now published by Pennsylvania State University Press. It features scholarly articles, translations of Moravian source material, and book reviews.
- Abundant Heritage Newsletter of the Moravian Historical Society-a biannual newsletter featuring events and programs run by the Moravian Historical Society.
- Moravian Walking Tour and Guidebook of the Lehigh Valley-a guidebook highlighting the Moravian sites in Nazareth, Bethlehem, Emmaus, Allentown, Easton, and Christian's Spring.
- Nazareth (Images of America)-a photobook depicting the history of Nazareth from settlement to present

== Events ==
The Moravian Historical Society offers a variety of events for all ages and interest levels. Historic Nazareth Walking Tours meet at the Whitefield House every second Saturday, and feature a tour guide in historic Moravian dress. The museum's Free Summer Sundays offer families a free museum tour as well as historic youth crafts and games. Monthly lecture and music programs allows visitors to explore Moravian and local history through lectures, music, screenings, and various family activities.

For children, the Moravian Historical Society holds an annual Hands-On History summer camp. The week-long camp allows campers to be immersed in history as they engaged in nature, archaeology, and art-based activities inspired by objects from our world-renowned collection. The Moravian Historical Society also holds an annual Arts & Crafts Festival featuring more than 100 craft vendors as well as food and free kids’ activities.

The Moravian Historical Society hosts the annual Share the Heritage Auction and Dinner to raise funds that support for its mission and its many activities and events.

== Annual meeting, lecture, and reception ==
Since 1858, the Moravian Historical Society has hosted an annual meeting, lecture, and reception to present the state of the society and to give a lecture on an aspect of Moravian history. Each year features a keynote speaker, as follows:

Date	Speaker	Lecture Name
2024	James A. Owen	Our Class in America: John Comenius and Native American Education at Harvard in the Seventeenth Century
2023	Winelle Kirton-Roberts	A free wildlife: Morale, Morality and Moravianism in Trinidad, 1885-1935
2022	Laurence Libin	John Clemm, David Tannenberg, and the Moravians’ Role in Establishing Keyboard Manufacture in America
2021	Scott Paul Gordon	Made in Christian's Spring: A Story of the American Revolution
2020	Jenna M. Gibbs	Conversion and Conflict: Christian Ignatius Latrobe Visits South Africa, 1807 - 1816
2019	Jeffrey Gemmell	Moravian Music of a Particular Time and Place: The Lititz Anthems of Johannes Herbst
2018	Craig D. Atwood	The Creation of the Modern Moravian Unity in 1957
2017	Natasha Lightfoot	The Complexities of Moravian Archives of the 19th Century West Indies: Gender and the Limits of Freedom in Post-Slavery Antigua
2016	Paul Peucker	A Family of Love: Another Look at the General Economy and the Beginnings of Bethlehem
2015	Otto Dreydoppel	Nazareth in 1857: From Moravian Community to Pennsylvania Borough
2014	Katherine M. Faull	Visualizing History: The (Hidden) Work of Moravian Women Missionaries in Colonial Pennsylvania
2013	Jeffrey Long	The Ephrata Tract: History of the Home of the Moravian Historical Society
2012	Scott Paul Gordon	Glad Passivity: Mary Penry of Lititz and the Making of Moravian Women
2011	Riddick Weber	’European Eyesing’ 18th Century North American Moravians: Problems with Applying European Understandings to North American Experience
2010	Katherine Carte Engel	Moravians in the Eighteenth-Century Atlantic World
2009	Rachel Wheeler	Mohicans and Missionaries in the Eighteenth-Century Northeast
2008	David Freeman	A Monumental History: Historic Sites Commemorated by the Moravian Historical Society
2007	Susan Dreydoppel	Looking Backward, Moving Forward: 150 Years of the Moravian Historical Society
2006	Nola Reed Knouse	Moravian Music: Introduction, Theme, and Variations
2005	Mark A. Turdo	Shaking the Faith: The Gnadenhütten Attack, 1755 and 2005
2004	Elizabeth A. Sommer	Fashion Passion: The Rhetoric of Dress in 18th Century Moravian Communities
2003	C. Daniel Crews	The Writing of With Courage for the Future: The History of the History
2002	David A. Schattschneider	A 250-Year-Old Mystery: The Disappearance of J.C. Erhardt in Labrador
2001	Larry Leon Hamlin	Popa C.W. Brown and the Black Moravians (play performed)
2000	Craig D. Atwood	Understanding Zinzendorf's Blood and Wounds Theology
1999	Katherine M. Faull	Relating Sisters’ Lives: Moravian Women's Writings from 18th Century America
1998	Jon F. Sensbach	Race and the early Moravian Church: A comparative perspective
1997	Paul Peucker	Heerendijk - Link in The Moravian Network: Moravian Colonists Destined for Pennsylvania.
1996	Daniel B. Thorp	New Wine in Old Bottles: Cultural Persistence Among Non-White Converts to The Moravian Church.
1995	Aaron Fogleman	Moravian Immigration and Settlement in British North America, 1734–1775.
1994	Roger Martin	John Ockershausen's Ockbrook Diary: The First Three Years of a Derbyshire Moravian Community 1750–1753.
1993	Samuel R. Zeiser	Moravians And Lutherans: Getting Beyond the Zinzendorf-Muhlenberg Impasse.
1992	Beverly Prior Smaby	Forming The Single Sisters’ Choir in Bethlehem.
1991	C. Daniel Crews	Through the Labyrinth: A Prelude to the Comenius Anniversary of 1992.
1990	Vernon Nelson	Peter Boehler's Reminiscences of the Beginnings of Nazareth and Bethlehem.
1989	Albert H. Frank	Spiritual Life in Schönbrunn Village.
1988	Lawrence Hartzell	Joshua, Jr.: Moravian Indian Musician.
1987	Mervin Weidner	The Twentieth Century Frontiers of Moravian Church Expansion: The Moravian Church in America, (Northern Province) 1936 - 1986.
1986	Edwin A. Sawyer	The Waldensian Influence on The Moravian Church.
1985	James Henkelman	The Development of The Alaska Moravian Church 1885 - 1985.
1984	Murray L. Wagner	Petr Chelčický: A Free Church Separatist.
1983	Earl R. Shay	Martin Hauser: the Old Pioneer of the New Purchase
1982	David A. Schattschneider	Moravians in the Midwest—1850 To 1900: A New Appreciation
1981	Helmut Lehman	Moravians in New England in 18th Century
1980	Werner G. Marx	The Moravians in Honduras, The First Fifty Years
1979	James D. Nelson	Wesley and the Moravians
1978	Richard D. Claypool, Robert E. Steelman	Moravian Musical Life as Reflected in the Music Collections in the Moravian Archives
1977	Albert H. Frank	Georg Neisser, an Early Moravian Historian
1976	John R. Weinlick	The Moravians and the Revolution: An Overview
1975	Donald J. Lineback	Heinrich Miller, An Exceptional Moravian
1974	W. Ross Yates	The Period of Questioning, 1850-1876
1973	Henry L. Williams	A Changing Church, the Moravian Church Seen Through Its Periodicals
1972	John F. Morman	Ohio, the End of an Era
1971	David A. Schattschneider	The Mission Philosophy of Zinzendorf and Spangenberg
1971	Kenneth G. Hamilton	After 200 Years in Labrador
1970	Jaroslav Pelikan	Comenius in Ecumenical Perspective
1969	Walser H. Allen	Bicentennial History of the Widow's Society of Bethlehem
1968	Winfred Kohls (read by John R. Weinlick)	Sarepta, Moravian Settlement in Russia
1967	Mrs. Thomas J. Butterfield	History of education in Bethlehem, PA
1966	Kenneth G. Hamilton	Salem in Wachovia and the Genius of the Moravians as Colonizers
1965	Vernon Nelson	Samuel Isles, First Moravian Missionary on Antiqua
1964	Richmond E. Myers	Moravians and the Civil War
1963	Allan W. Schattschneider	A History of the Moravian Church at New Dorp, Staten Island, N.Y.
1962	Clarence E. Clewell	Two Hundred Years of History of the Moravian Church at Schoeneck
1961	Henry L. Williams	Our Moravian Hymnal and How We Got It
1960	Edwin W. Kortz	The Liturgical Development of the American Moravian Church
1960	John Fliegel	The Influence of Zinzendorf on the Present-Day Moravian Church
1959	Samuel V. Gapp	Philip H. Gapp, Home Missionary
1958	Edwin A. Sawyer	Religious Enthusiasm in the Early Bethlehem and Nazareth Settlements
1957	Heinz Motel	The Relation of the Old and Renewed Moravian Church to the Reformation
1956	Ann Hark	A Moravian Colonial Incident
1955	John H. Weinlick	The Moravian Diaspora
1954	Vernon W. Couillard	Glimpses of the Life, Spiritual Experiences, Work and Beliefs of John Cennick, Methodist - Moravian (1718 - 1755)
1953	John H. Weinlick	The Moravian Diaspora
1952	Kenneth G. Hamilton	The Office of the Bishop in the Renewed Moravian Church
1951	Herbert H. Beck	William Henry, Patriot, Master Gunsmith, Progenitor of the Steamboat
1950	Mabel Haller	Facets of Early Moravian Education
1949	A. O. Danneberger	The Atlantic Coast of Nicaragua, Central America - Its political, economic, and religious conditions
1948	(No speaker)	
1947	Richmond E Myers	Moravian Mission Work on the Susquehanna
1946	Henry A. Kuehl	The Beginnings and Development of the Moravian Settlement of Emmaus, Pennsylvania
1945	Garth A. Howland	An Architectural History of the Moravian Church of Bethlehem, Penna
1944	John R. MacNicol	Fairfield and New Fairfield, Kent County Ontario; Restoration Program
1943	Garth A. Howland	The Early Appearances of the Moravian Buildings on Church Street, Bethlehem, Pennsylvania
1942	Paul T. Warner	History of the First Moravian Church, Philadelphia, Penna., 1742*1942
1941	John Joseph Stoudt	Count Zinzendorf and the Pennsylvania Congregation of God in the Spirit
1940	Amos A. Ettinger	Nazareth, An American Theocracy
1939	Kenneth G. Hamilton	Bishop John Ettwein and Missionary Activity among the Northern American Indians
1938	Hans T. David	Musical Life in the Pennsylvania Settlements of the Moravians
1937	David Sanders Clark	The Moravian Mission of Pilgerruh
1936	Albert G. Rau	The Autobiography of John Christopher Pyrlaeus
1935	Herbert H. Beck	Town Regulations of Lititz in 1759
1934	Adelaide Fries	Early Hymns and Customs
1933	Albert G. Rau	Some Further Notes on Early Moravian Music in North America
1932	R. R. Hillman	Old Dansbury
1931	Albert G. Rau	Christian Frederick Post and Colonial Politics, 1755-1763
1930	J. Taylor Hamilton	Moravian Undertakings at Oley, PA
1929	J. Taylor Hamilton	The Contacts of the Moravians with the Iroquois League
1928	H. J. Steele	Penn Heir Case
1927	Bishop Hamilton	Facts Leading up to August 13, 1727
1926	Henry F. Marx	The Moravians in Northampton County
1926	W. H. Vogler (read by G. F. Bahnson)	The Old Mulberry Tree
1925	John Baer	Settlement of the Walloons on Manhattan Island in 1624
1925	Paul E. Beck	David Tanneberger
1924	J. Taylor Hamilton	Recognition of the Moravian Church as an Ancient Protestant Episcopal Church by Act of the Parliament of Great Britain in 1749
1923	Adelaide Fries	The Life and Work of Anna Nitschmann
1922	J. E. Weinland	The Story of the Gospel by the Beautiful Spring
1921	J. Max Hark	The Beginnings of Moravian Work in Lancaster, PA
1921	Robert Rau (read by Albert G. Rau)	The Physicians of Early Bethlehem
1921	Robert Rau (read by Eugene. A. Rau)	The Pharmacists of Early Bethlehem
1921	W. H. Vogler	Museum Values
1920	Clara A. Beck	An Honest Effort to Save Pennsylvania from the Moravians
1920	H. B. Marx	The Winning of a Bride by King Srong-Bsan-Sgam-Po
1920	T. M. Rights	Into the Indian Territory in 1870
1919	Adelaide Fries	To Answer the Call: the Voyage of Rev. Lewis David deSchweinitz and His Bride to the United States
1919	J. Taylor Hamilton	John Antes, a Pioneer American Missionary of the Eighteenth Century in Egypt
1918	Albert G. Rau	Music of the Moravian Church
1918	J. Upton Myers	The Social Evolution of Old Bethlehem
1917	J. Upton Myers	The Growth of the Social Order in Bethlehem
1916	R. E. Shields	The Hope Female Seminary
1915	W. E. Doster	Glimpses of Old Bethlehem
1914	A. D Thaeler	Bohemia and the Brethren in Bohemia
1914	Albert L. Oerter	Closing of the Single Brethren's Economy at Christian Spring in 1796
1913	Abraham R. Beck	Diary of Catherine Fritsch, Resident in Lititz Sisters’ House
1913	Albert L. Oerter	A Quiet Corner During the Revolution, 1775-1783
1913	Harry E. Stocker	The Moravian Mission Among the Indians on the White River in Indiana
1912	M. W. Leibert	A Sketch of the Origin and the Early History of the Moravian Church in New York
1911	H. A. Jacobson	Reminisces of Sixty Years Ago
1911	H. A. Jacobson	The Nazareth Market House and Engine House
1910	Edward T. Kluge	Lewis Ferdinand Lambert
1910	H. A. Jacobson	The Walking Purchase
1910	H. H. Hacker	A Few Notes on the Early Moravian Schools in Pennsylvania, and on the First Boarding School in Nazareth Hall
1909	Albert G. Rau	Some Notes Concerning Trades and Industries in Bethlehem
1909	Paul de Schweinitz	The Evangelical Union of the Bohemian and Moravian Brethren in Texas
1908	Edward T. Kluge	An Excursion to Bethlehem and Nazareth in 1799
1908	Joseph A. Rice	A Sketch of the Newspapers of Bethlehem, with a Brief Account of the Printing Offices and Book Binderies
1907	Albert G. Rau	Historical Sketch of the Whitefield House
1907	Henry A. Jacobson	History of the Moravian Historical Society from 1857 to 1907
1906	Abraham R. Beck	Some Random Extracts from the Diaries and Minutes of the Committee of Temporal Affairs of the Lititz Moravian Congregation
1906	Albert G. Rau	Fire Protection and Fire Departments in Bethlehem
1906	J. W. Jordan	Franklin's Moravian Friend (James Hutton)
1905	Edward T. Kluge	Extracts from Ledger A of the Philadelphia Congregation, 1785 - 1833
1905	Isaac Huntting	The Last of the Pequots
1905	Robert Rau	Shecomeco
1904	Edward T. Kluge	Nazareth Hall: the Laying of the Cornerstone, May 3, 1755, and Various Items Connected with the Erection of the Building, Together with Reminiscences of an Old Hall Boy of 1835 and Later
1904	Robert Rau	Chronicles of the Moravian Congregation at Donegal, PA
1903	Edward T. Kluge	The Graveyard at Nazareth and some of the Most Noted Persons Interred There
1903	H. A. Jacobson	Brief Sketch of the Indian Settlement at Nain
1902	Edward T. Kluge	The Moravian Graveyards at Nazareth
1902	Edward T. Kluge	When and Under What Circumstances the Moravian Historical Society was Called into Existence
1902	Henry T. Clauder	The Early Missions of the Moravian Church Among the Cherokee Indians in Northern Georgia
1901	Albert G. Rau	Humorous Reminiscences of Bethlehem and Nazareth
1901	C. A. Haehnle	Account of the March of Napoleon's Army through Ebersdorf, Germany, October 6 to 14, 1806
1901	Edward T. Kluge	Something About Trombones and Trombonists
1900	Eugene Leibert	Wechquetank
1900	John M. Levering	A Century Ago
1900	Robert Rau	A Brief Chapter on Ancestor Worship
1899	Eugene Leibert	Some Occurrences in the Official Circle at Herrnhut in 1760
1898	Eugene Leibert	Extracts from the Diary of the Moravian Church at Lititz, PA, Relating to the Revolutionary War
1898	J. M. Levering	The Beginning and the End of the Single Brethren's House at Bethlehem, PA
1898	J. Taylor Hamilton	The Continuity of the Unitas Fratrum
1897	Eugene Leibert	The Surprise and Massacre at Frederic Hoeth's Plantation, in 1755, and the Subsequent Fortunes of His Daughter Mariana
1897	J. M. Levering (read by J. Taylor Hamilton)	Notes on the Family of William Parsons, the Father of Easton, Together With Some Related Matter
1897	John W. Jordan (read by M. W. Leibert)	Harvesting under Difficulties on the Barony of Nazareth in 1746
1897	W. H. Jordan (read by Paul de Schweinitz)	Reminiscences of the Old First Moravian Church of Philadelphia and Some of its Members
1896	Eugene Leibert	Three Moravian Weddings
1896	J. M. Levering	Our Name
1896	Robert Rau	Some Notes on the Erection of the Moravian Church at Bethlehem
1895	Henry A. Jacobson	Journey of Brother Schnall from Nazareth, PA to Fairfield Canada, in the year 1801
1895	J. M. Levering	Some Notes on the first Missionary Society in America - the Society for the Furtherance of the Gospel, founded August 19, and fully organized November 28th, 1745
1895	J. Taylor Hamilton	Sketch of the Moravian Church in Camden Valley, New York
1894	J. Taylor Hamilton	Autobiography of Bernhard Adam Grube
1894	John W. Jordan	Extracts from the Diary of the Lancaster Congregation
1893	Eugene Leibert	The Sesqui-centennial of the Whitefield House
1893	James Henry	Our History an Inheritance
1892	Helen Bell	Sermon by the Bishop Lodi, delivered before the Sentence of John Hus was Carried out
1892	J. Taylor Hamilton	The Work of Moravian Evangelists among the Swedes in New Jersey during the Eighteenth Century
1892	William Henry Rice	Four Hundred Miles Overland for a Bride
1891	Henry A. Jacobson	Christmas at Bethlehem
1891	James Henry	The Malin Library
1891	John W. Jordan	An Old Letter of 1766
1890	Henry A. Jacobson	Flight and Dispersion of the Missionaries from Fairfield, Canada
1890	Robert de Schweinitz	Another Fragment from the Diary of Rev. Lewis David de Schweinitz During his Voyage to America in 1812
1889	Henry A. Jacobson	Attempts to Establish a Mission Among the Chippeway Indians in Canada, from 1800 to 1807 (by Christian Henry Denke and John Schnall)
1889	James Henry	Eminent Moravian Women of the Olden Time
1889	John W. Jordan	Lewis Weiss
1889	Robert de Schweinitz	Extract from the Diary of Rev. Lewis David de Schweinitz, Describing a Voyage from Holland to America during the Thrilling Times of the War of 1812
1888	Henry A. Jacobson	Diary of the Journey of Christian Froehlich and the Negro Andrew among the Negroes of New Jersey, New York, Long Island, and Brunswick in November and December, 1748
1888	James Henry	Music at Nazareth
1888	John W. Jordan	Biographical Sketch of Edward Evans
1887	Abraham S. Schropp	James Burnside, Planter, Evangelist, and Politician
1887	Edward T. Kluge	Nazareth Hall and its Steeple
1887	James Henry	The Children of the Nursery
1886	James Henry	The First Moravian Cemetery at Nazareth
1886	John W. Jordan	Historical Sketch of the Moravian Settlement at Broad Bay, Maine
1886	Robert Rau	Frederica Miskau, the Recluse of Gnadenhütten on the Mahoning
1885	John W. Jordan	A History of the Vessels Engaged in Transporting Colonists for the Moravian Settlements Between 1742 and 1767
1884	James Henry	Memoir of Bishop Christian Gottlieb Hueffel
1884	John W. Jordan	The Life of Mary Allen
1883	Henry A. Jacobson	The Brethren's House at Nazareth
1883	John W. Jordan	The Lehigh Ferry at Bethlehem
1882	Henry A. Jacobson	Sketch of the History of the Moravian Historical Society during the Past Twenty-Five Years
1882	James Henry	General Retrospect of the Moravian Historical Society's Transactions since its Organization
1882	John W. Jordan	Biographical Sketch of John Henry Miller, Printer and Member of the Brethren's Church at Philadelphia during the Revolutionary War
1881	Henry A. Jacobson	Narrative of the General Synod of 1789
1881	J. Max Hark	Arrest and Trial of our Missionaries Among the Indians of New England in June 1743, as Narrated by John Christopher Pyrlaeus
1881	James Henry	Some Additions to the History of the Rose Tavern and the Neighboring Settlements
1880	J. Max Hark	Historical Sketch of the Mission and Indian Village at Meniolagomeka
1880	James Henry	Impressions Made on Distinguished Visitors at Nazareth during its Early Days
1880	John W. Jordan	Moravian Washhouses
1879	Henry A. Jacobson	Translation of the Diary of a Company of Brethren Journeying from St. Petersburg to Sarepta, Russia, in January, 1790
1879	James Henry	Government of the Moravian Village during the Exclusive System
1878	Henry A. Jacobson	Diary of the Brethren Cammerhof and Gottlieb Petzold on their Journey to Wechquadnach and Pachgatgoch, from February 28 to March 11, 1749, A. A. Reinke - Selections from Shewkirk's Diary at New York during the Revolutionary Times
1878	J. Max Hark	Extracts from the Minutes of the Ninth Annual Meeting of the Society for Propagating the Gospel among the Heathen, Bethlehem, 1795
1878	James Henry	The Historical Element in Moravian Writings
1877	Henry A. Jacobson	Notes on the Condition of Nazareth, Christian's Spring and Friedensthal during the Revolution
1877	Henry A. Jacobson	Brief Abstract of the Minutes of the Moravian Historical Society since its Organization Twenty Years Ago
1877	James Henry	Reminiscences of Revolutionary Times, with Reference to the Settlements of Bethlehem and Nazareth
1877	John W. Jordan	Historical Sketch of the Use of Trombones in the American Congregations during the last Century
1876	Henry A. Jacobson	Christian Henry Rauch's Journey to the Mohawk Indians
1876	Henry A. Jacobson	Poem Composed by Bro. Gregor for his daughter on the Occasion of her Birthday
1876	James Henry	Extracts of Letters of Bishop Cammerhof Relating to Early Times at Nazareth
1876	John W. Jordan	Historical Fragments Relating to the Church at Lebanon, or Hebron
1876	William Henry Rice	The Zauchtenthal Ivy. Record of the Planting of the Ivy at the Northwestern Gable of the Whitefield House
1875	Henry A. Jacobson	The Sisters’ House at Nazareth, Second Paper
1875	James Henry	The Sisters’ House at Nazareth, First Paper
1875	John W. Jordan	The Secession of Three Members and their Families from the Church in Philadelphia
1874	Henry A. Jacobson	Report of a Visitation by Charles Gotthold Reichel to Wyoming and Several Other Places in Luzerne County, in 1791
1874	James Henry	Account of the Organization of Nazareth Hall in 1785
1874	William C. Reichel	The Life of David Nitschmann, Wagonwright, Known as the Founder of Bethlehem
1873	Henry A. Jacobson	Extracts from Heckewelder's Diary of a Visit to Petquotting in 1789
1873	James Henry	The Visit of the Chiefs of the Six Nations to Nazareth in 1792
1872	James Henry	Moravian Manuscript Literature
1871	William C. Reichel	Disjecta Membra, Being a Fragmentary History of the Ephrata House
1870	(No speaker)	
1869	Edmund de Schweinitz	Protestation of Reformed and Lutheran Churches of Philadelphia Against the Moravians, 1742
1869	Eugene Leibert	Extracts from the Diary of Bethlehem, 1742
1868	James Henry	Life in a Moravian Village in the Olden Time (Nazareth Being the Type)
1868	John C. Brickenstein	Extracts from the Diary of Bethlehem
1868	Louis R. Huebener	Extracts from the Diary of the Lititz Brethren's House
1867	James Henry	History of Christian's Spring
1866	(No speaker)	
1865	James Henry	Moravian Sermons
1865	John C. Brickenstein	The Old Graveyard at Nazareth
1864	Edmund de Schweinitz	David Zeisberger (Second Paper)
1864	John C. Brickenstein	The Second Sea Congregation
1863	Charles F. Kluge	History of Hope, NJ
1863	Edmund de Schweinitz	David Zeisberger (First Paper)
1863	John C. Brickenstein	The First Sea Congregation
1862	John C. Brickenstein	Additional Extracts from the Diary of Nazareth, 1746
1861	James Henry	Moravian Vespers
1861	John C. Brickenstein	Extracts from the Diary of Nazareth, 1745 and 1746
1860	James Henry	The Deep Foundations of Early Moravianism
1859	(No speaker)	
1858	James Henry	The Ephrata House
1857	H. A. Brickenstein	Peter Boehler's Oak-Tree

== See also ==
- List of historical societies in Pennsylvania
