= Waynesboro Historical Society =

Historic house in Pennsylvania, United States

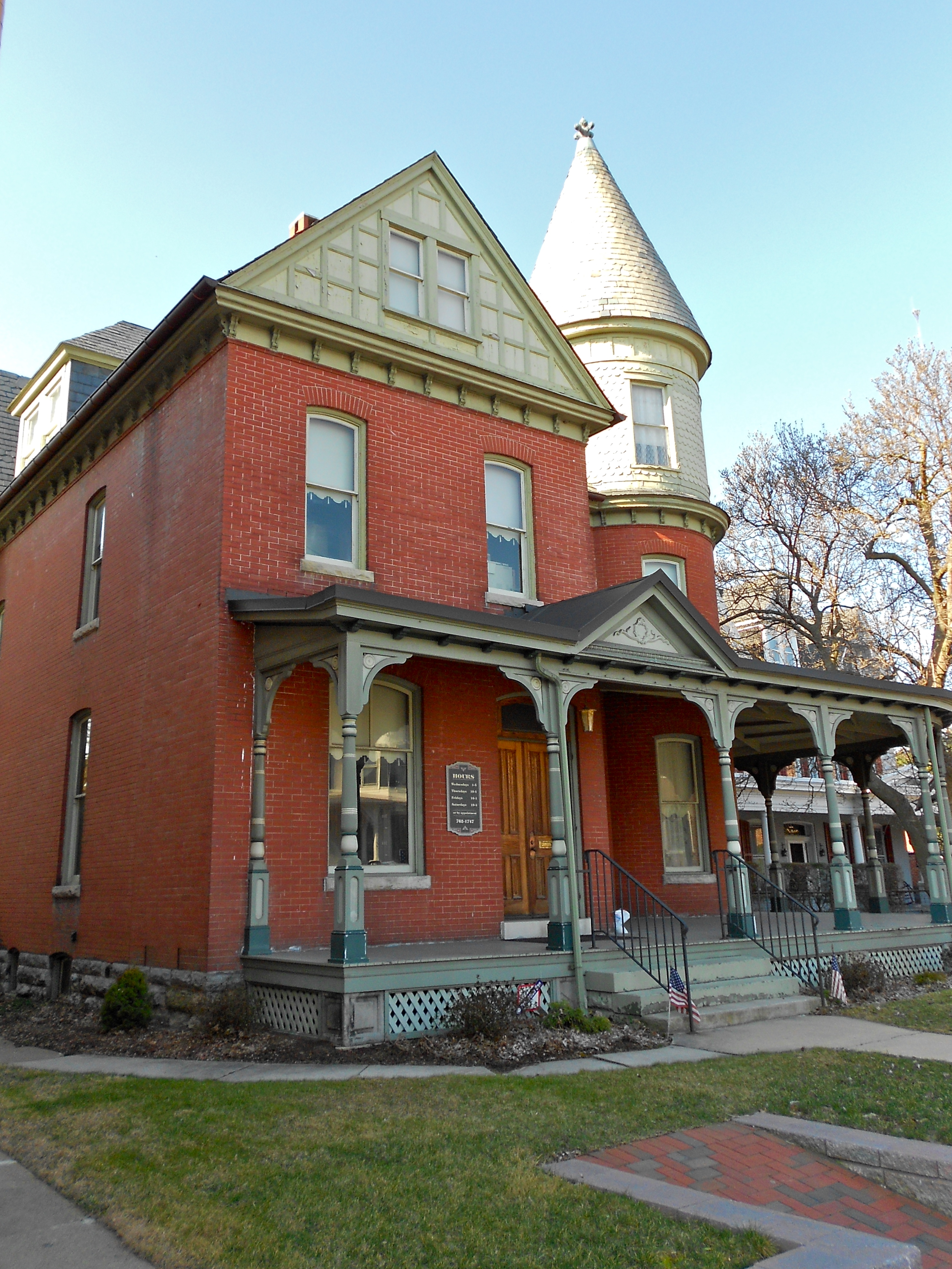
- Oller House
- Formation: 1963
- Type: Historical Society
- Headquarters: 138 West Main Street; Waynesboro, PA 17268
- Website: Homepage

The Waynesboro Historical Society is an historical society founded in 1963 and based in Waynesboro, Pennsylvania. The Society's headquarters are housed in the Oller House. The society works for the preservation of landmarks and structures in the Waynesboro area and holds regular meetings, open to the public, which feature speakers on topics of local interest.

== Donation of the building ==
J.J. and Myrtle (Funk) Oller eldest child, Rello Oller (1895-1992), never married and in 1990 she leased the house to the Society for U.S. $1.00 a year with the understanding that on her death the property would inure to the Society. She had two younger brothers, both of whom married but had no children.

The house was listed on the National Register of Historic Places in 1996.

== Collections ==
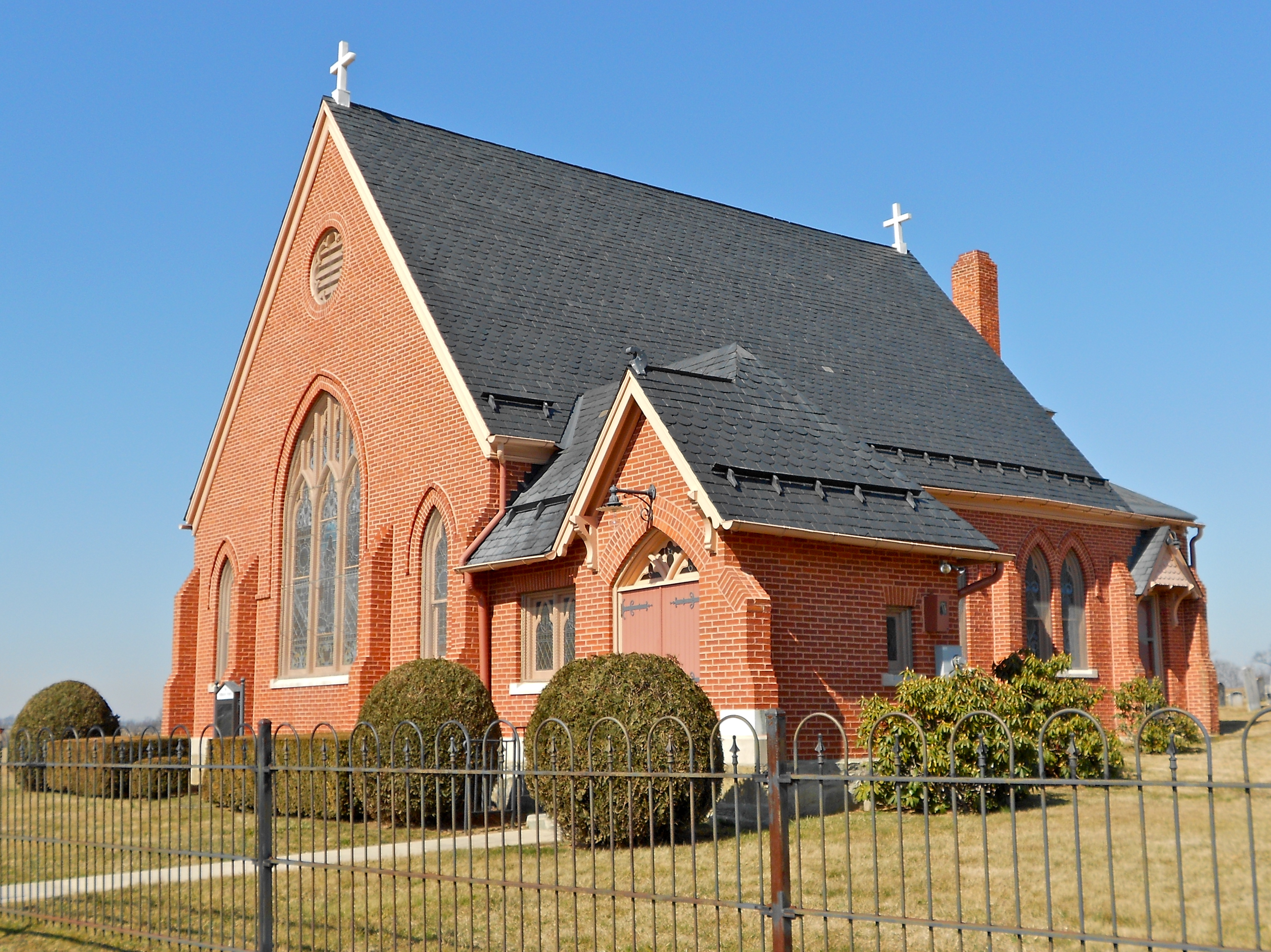
Harbaugh Church

The Society's collections include a number of different types of materials:

- Books and pamphlets: ranging from limited-edition and out-of-print volumes to current reference works and scholarly monographs.
- Manuscripts: materials such as letters, diaries, account books, deeds, minutes, and scrapbooks. Manuscript collections include personal papers created by individuals and families, and records created by organizations and businesses.
- Graphics: prints, watercolors, and other works of art on paper, architectural drawings, photographs, broadsides, maps, posters, and other images.
- Printed ephemera: such as event programs, brochures, invitations, advertisements, trade cards, certificates, and menus.
- Genealogical resources include many 3 ring binders with material on local family names, cemetery burial lists, undertakers records and other original local history in addition to published books and pamphlets.

== Publications ==
In addition to the Society's quarterly newsletter, the Society has published two volumes of a cookbook Culinary Traditions: A Taste of Waynesboro and has back issues of Antietam Ancestors a former journal published by the Society.

== Properties ==
The Society holds title to and maintains 5 properties in the Waynesboro area:

- Oller House
- Harbaugh Church
- Historic Marker at the birthplace of the Reverend Dr. Henry Harbaugh
- Welty's Bridge
- Zullinger School

== See also ==
- List of historical societies in Pennsylvania
