= List of historical societies in Pennsylvania =

The following is a list of historical societies in the state of Pennsylvania, United States.

== Organizations ==
1917 publication of the Delaware County Historical Society, Pennsylvania

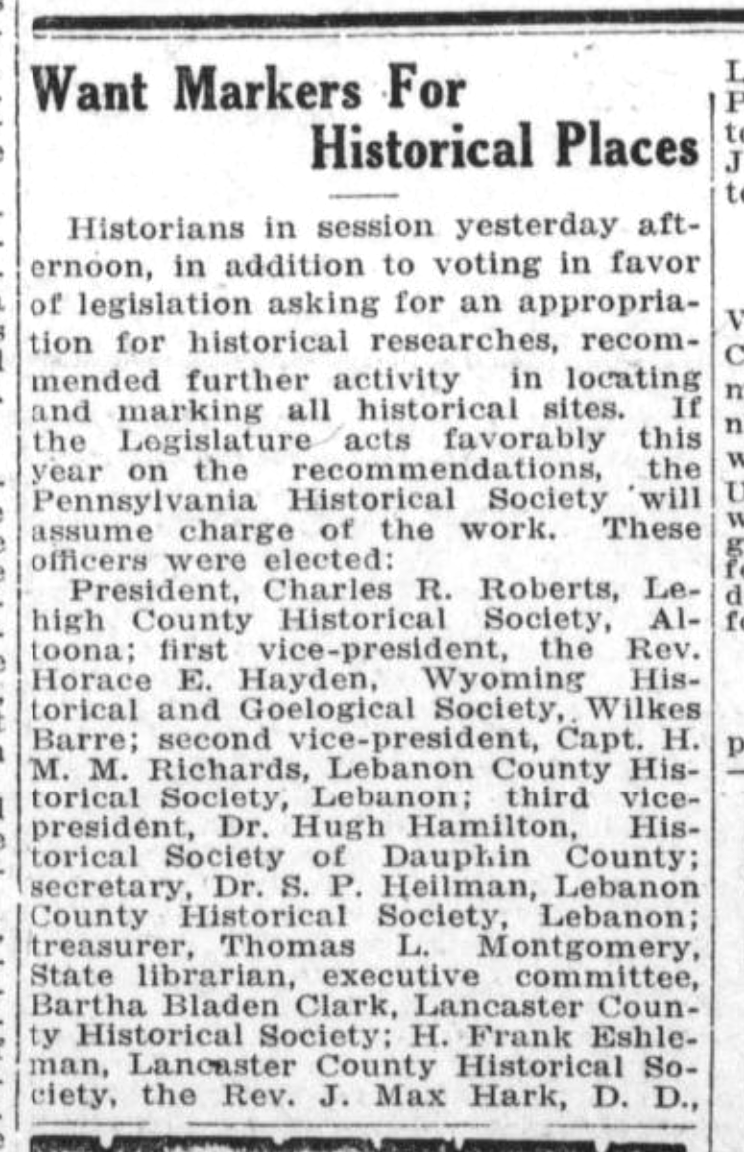
1917 newspaper item about historical markers and historical societies in Pennsylvania

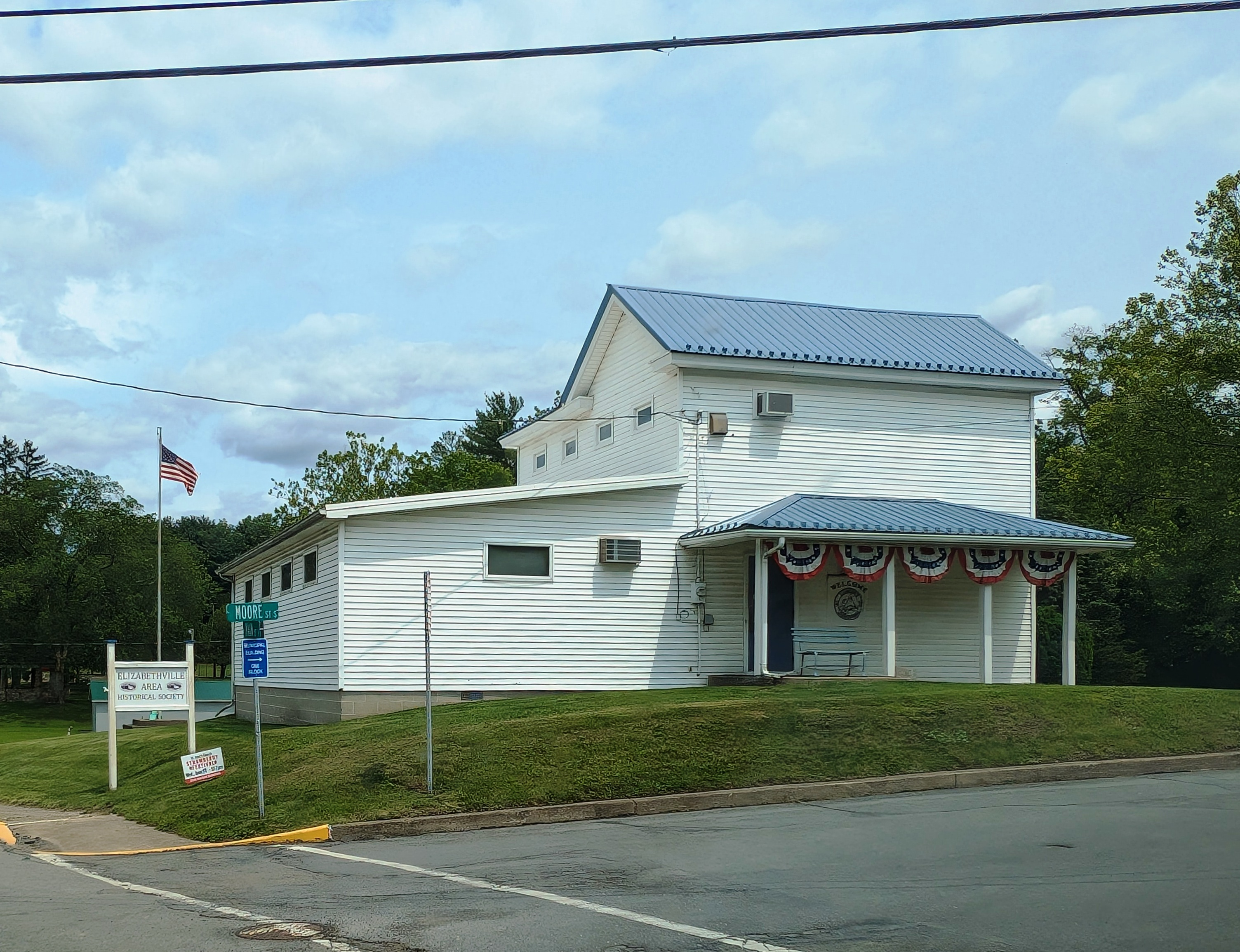
Elizabethville Area Historical Society building in Pennsylvania (photo 2025)

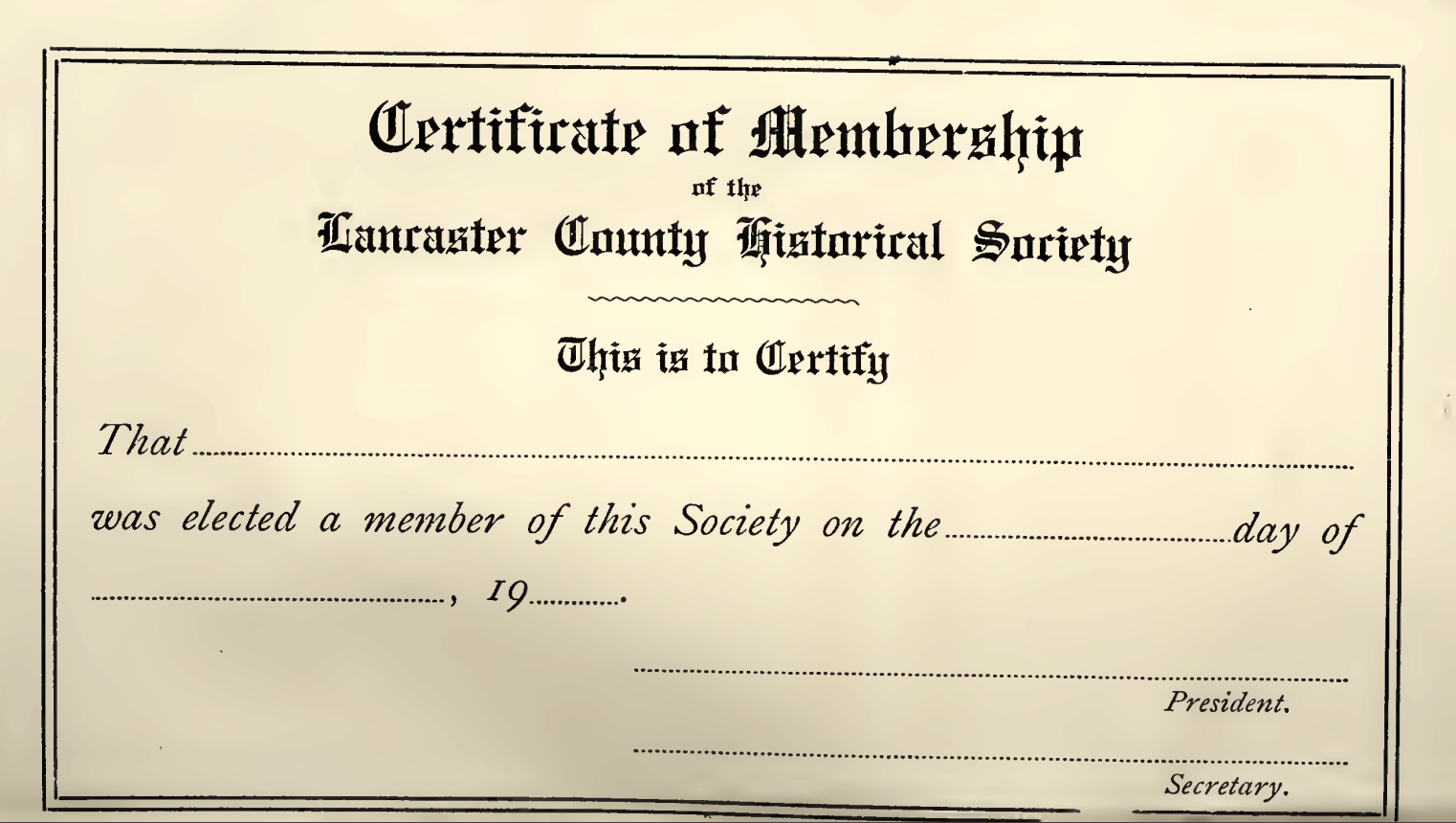
Certificate of membership in the Lancaster County Historical Society, Pennsylvania, 1906

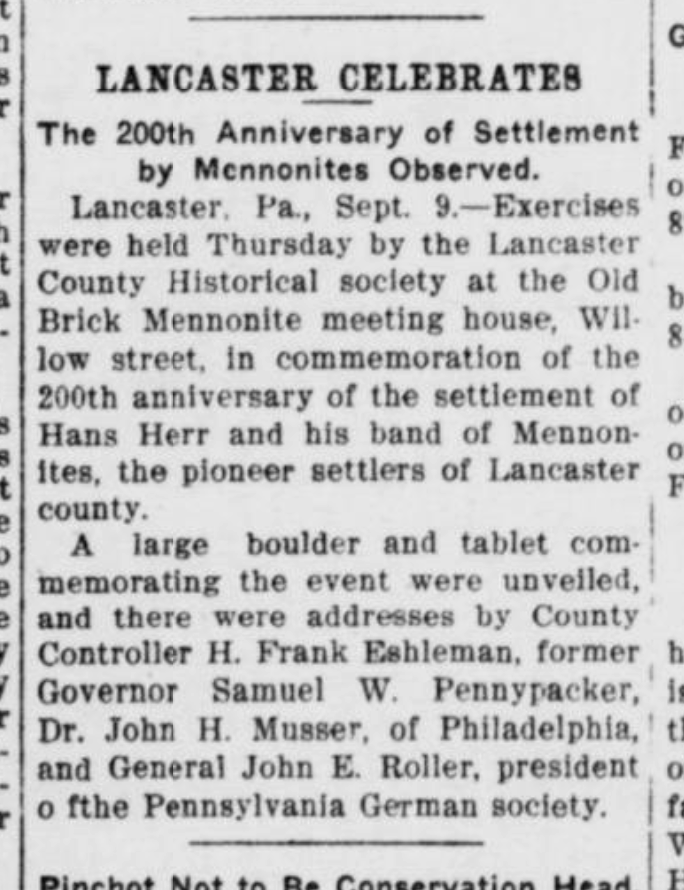
1910 newspaper item about the Lancaster County Historical Society in Pennsylvania

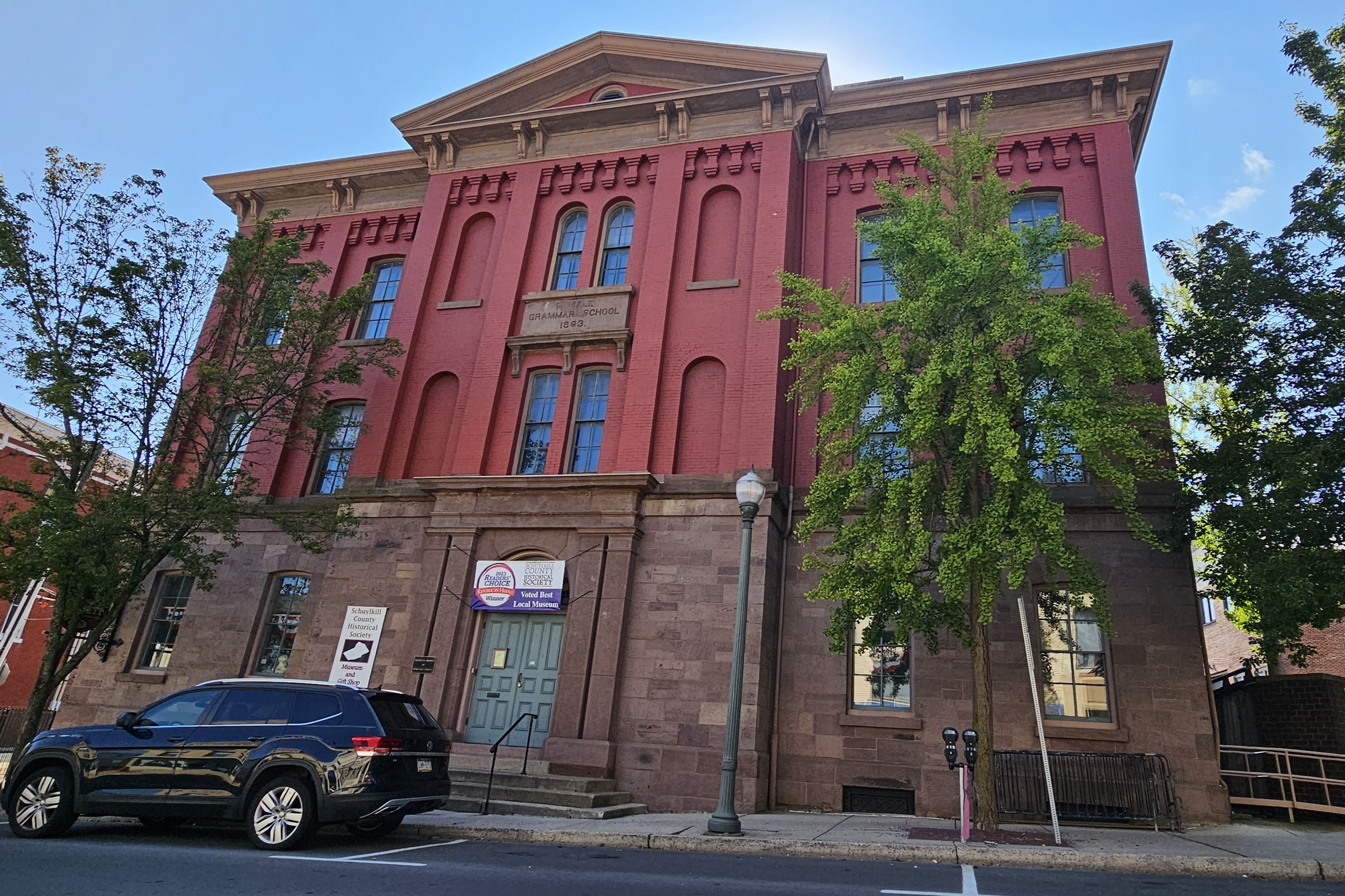
Schuylkill County Historical Society building in Pennsylvania (photo 2023)

- Adams County Historical Society
- Allegheny-Kiski Valley Historical Society
- Antietam Historical Association
- Beaver Falls Historical Society and Museum
- Bedford County Historical Society
- Historical Society of Berks County
- Biglerville Historical and Preservation Society
- Blair County Historical Society
- Historical Society of the Blairsville Area
- Bradford County Historical Society
- Bucks County Historical Society
- Butler County Historical Society, Pennsylvania
- California Area Historical Society
- Cambria County Historical Society
- Carbondale Historical Society and Museum
- Historical Society of Carnegie
- Catholic Historical Society of Western Pennsylvania
- Centre County Historical Society
- Chadds Ford Historical Society
- Chester County History Center
- Chestnut Hill Historical Society (in Philadelphia)
- Clarion County Historical Society
- Clinton County Historical Society
- Concord Township Historical Society
- Conneaut Valley Area Historical Society
- Connellsville Area Historical Society
- Conshohocken Historical Society
- Corry Area Historical Society
- Crawford County Historical Society
- Cumberland County Historical Society
- Historical Society of Dauphin County
- Delaware County Historical Society
- Derry Township Historical Society
- Downington Historical Society
- Edinboro Area Historical Society
- Elizabeth Township Historical Society (in Allegheny County)
- Elizabethtown Historical Society
- Elizabethville Area Historical Society
- Elk County Historical Society
- Erie County Historical Society
- Equinunk Historical Society
- Fairview Area Historical Society
- Historical Society of Fort Washington
- Historical Society of Frankford
- Franklin County Historical Society
- Fulton County Historical Society
- Germantown Historical Society (in Philadelphia)
- Greene County Historical Society
- Hanover Area Historical Society
- Haverford Township Historical Society
- Highlands Historical Society, Pennsylvania
- Highspire Historical Society
- Hummelstown Area Historical Society
- Huntingdon County Historical Society
- Historical and Genealogical Society of Indiana County
- Jacobsburg Historical Society (in Nazareth)
- Jefferson County Historical and Genealogical Society
- Jefferson Township Historical Society
- Johnstown Area Heritage Association
- Lackawanna Historical Society
- Lancaster County Historical Society
- Lancaster Mennonite Historical Society
- Lansdale Historical Society
- Latrobe Area Historical Society
- Lawrence County Historical Society
- Lawrence Park Historical Society
- Lebanon County Historical Society
- Leechburg Area Museum and Historical Society
- Lehigh County Historical Society
- Ligonier Valley Historical Society
- Limerick Township Historical Society
- Linesville Historical Society
- Lower Marion Historical Society (in Rosemont)
- Luzerne County Historical Society
- Lycoming County Historical Society and Taber Museum
- Manheim Historical Society
- Mercer County Historical Society
- Middletown Area Historical Society
- Mifflin County Historical Society
- Historical Society of Millersburg and Upper Paxton Township
- Historical Society of Montgomery County, Pennsylvania
- Monroe County Historical Association
- Historical Society of Montgomery County
- Moravian Historical Society
- Historic Morrisville Society
- Muncy Historical Society
- New Holland Area Historical Society
- Newport Historical Society
- Newville Historical Society
- Northern York County Historical and Preservation Society
- Northampton County Historical and Genealogical Society
- Northumberland County Historical Society
- Old York Road Historical Society
- Historical Society of Pennsylvania
- Pennsylvania Postal History Society
- Perkasie Anniversary and Historical Society
- Historical Society of the Phoenixville Area
- Pike County Historical Society
- Pikeland Historical Society
- Potter County Historical Society
- Pottstown Historical Society
- Quakertown Historical Society
- Radnor Historical Society
- Red Lion Area Historical Society
- St. Marys and Benzinger Historical Society
- Schuylkill County Historical Society
- Sharon Heritage Society
- Sharpsville Area Historical Society
- Snyder County Historical Society
- Solanco Historical Society (in Quarryville)
- Somerset Historical Center
- Strasburg Heritage Society
- Stewartstown Historical Society
- Susquehanna County Historical Society
- Thornbury Historical Society
- Tri-County Heritage Society (in Morgantown)
- Tyrone Area Historical Society
- Union County Historical Society
- Valley Forge Historical Society
- Venango County Historical Society
- Wampum Area Historical Society
- Warren County Historical Society
- Washington County Historical Society, Pennsylvania
- Washington Crossing Historic Park
- Wayne County Historical Society, Pennsylvania
- Waynesboro Historical Society
- West Hanover Township Historical Society
- Historical Society of Western Pennsylvania
- Westmoreland County Historical Society
- Wissahickon Valley Historical Society
- Wyoming Historical and Geological Society
- Historical Society of York County
- Zelienople Historical Society

== See also ==
- History of Pennsylvania
- List of museums in Pennsylvania
- National Register of Historic Places listings in Pennsylvania
- List of historical societies in the United States
