= Benjamin Matthias Nead =

American writer, lawyer, and politician

Benjamin Matthias Nead (1847–1923) was an American historian, author, newspaper editor, lawyer, and politician.

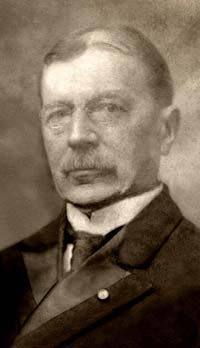
B. M. Nead circa 1915

== Early life and education ==
Nead was born July 14, 1847, in Antrim Township, near Greencastle, Franklin County, Pennsylvania. He was the eldest child of Benjamin Franklin Nead and his wife, nee Eleanor Wunderlich. Both parents were of German extraction and counted among their ancestors several prominent early Palatine immigrants. On February 11, 1895, B. M. Nead joined the Pennsylvania Society Sons of the American Revolution by virtue of descent from three ancestors: viz., John Wunderlich, Peter Dechert, and Benjamin Spyker. Many of his other ancestors served the cause of the Revolution. For more than thirty years, his ancestor Peter Spyker was judge of Berks county, Pennsylvania, and was one of the commissioners appointed by the Provincial Assembly to raise funds with which to prosecute the War of Independence.

When Nead was a small child, his family settled in Chambersburg, Pennsylvania. His father prospered as part of the forwarding and commission partnership Wunderlich & Nead and was thus enabled to provide good educations for his children. The Nead family long occupied the residence located at 157 Lincoln Way East in Chambersburg. The annex of the Franklin County Courthouse is at that location.

B. M. Nead received his early education in the Chambersburg Academy and under the tutelage of the Reverend James Kennedy, Chambersburg. He was prepared for college at the Hopkins Grammar School, New Haven, Connecticut, and then matriculated at Yale University. At Yale, Nead was a member of Brothers and Delta Kappa. He graduated from Yale University in 1870 with an A. B. degree.

== Career ==
=== Lawyer ===
Following his graduation from Yale, Nead studied law in the office of Francis M. Kimmel in Chambersburg. In June 1872, Nead was admitted to the bar of Franklin County and practised law at Chambersburg until 1875. During this period he gained a reputation as a tax expert. From 1875 until 1881, he served as State Tax Deputy in the Department of the Auditor General of Pennsylvania. On January 22, 1880, he was admitted to the bar of Dauphin county, Pennsylvania, and continued in his profession at Harrisburg, latter county, until 1921 when ill health forced him to retire. In 1883 Governor Pattison appointed Nead to the State Tax Commission, known as the "Cooper Tax Commission," which was charged with revising the revenue laws of Pennsylvania and reporting a new system of taxation to the Assembly. In the same year, the governor appointed Nead to a special commission of six expert accountants (of which Nead was made secretary) formed to devise a new system of accounting for the Commonwealth of Pennsylvania. From 1883 until 1891, he was Pennsylvania's financial agent at Washington, DC. In 1905, he served as president of the Dauphin County Bar Association.

=== Politician ===
Politically, B. M. Nead was a staunch Democrat. In 1872, he was chairman of the Franklin County Democratic Committee. In 1874, he was appointed secretary of the State Democratic Committee and, in 1887, became the permanent secretary, serving seven consecutive one-year terms. In 1894, the Democrats nominated him for a seat in Congress; however, he withdrew from the campaign because the Comptroller of Currency had recently appointed him receiver of the National Bank of Middletown.

=== Newspaperman ===
While serving in the Auditor General's Department, Nead also was legislative correspondent for various Pennsylvania newspapers. In 1887, he became editor-in-chief of the Harrisburg Daily Patriot and, in 1888 and 1889, he owned and edited the Harrisburg Morning Call in partnership with his brother Dr. Daniel W. Nead.

=== Historian ===
Nead was one of the foremost Pennsylvania historians of his time. Chief among his numerous works:

- Sketches of Early Chambersburg (1872)
- Nead's Guide to County Officers (1877)
- The Colonial and Provincial Laws of Pennsylvania, 1676-1700 (1878)
- Historical Notes on the Legislative Councils and Assemblies of Pennsylvania, 1623-1700 (1878) (commonly referred to as "The Duke of York's Laws")
- A Brief Review of the Financial History of Pennsylvania, 1682-1881 (1881)
- Waynesboro: Centennial History, 1797-1900 (1900)
- Some Hidden Sources of Fiction (1909)

In addition he either wrote or edited dozens of historical addresses, newspaper articles, and monographs. He also wrote and narrated a magic lantern presentation titled "In the Footprints of Pennsylvania's Past."

Waynesboro: Centennial History, 1797-1900 is Nead's best-known work today; after more than a century, it remains a viable community history. In 1909, however, Nead received much notice in both America and England for his work Some Hidden Sources of Fiction, in which he exposed Sir Gilbert Parker's 1896 novel The Seats of the Mighty as a work of plagiarism. Nead accomplished this exposure by presenting certain passages from Parker's work in tandem with amazingly similar passages from an earlier book, Memoirs of Major Robert Stobo, by Neville B. Craig (Pittsburgh, 1854). With compliments to Sir Gilbert for his superior product, Nead sought justice for the elder Craig; while noting that Parker's product was indeed more sophisticated, Nead nevertheless proved that Parker's story could not have been other than a revision of Craig's humbler work.

== Personal life and demise ==
B. M. Nead was twice married. On October 14, 1875, he married Elizabeth Jane Hayes, daughter of David and Nancy (Colwell) Hayes, of Shippensburg, Pennsylvania. Before her untimely death on January 11, 1883, "Libbie" bore Nead two sons, Benjamin Frank Nead (born December 27, 1877) and Robert Hayes Nead (born March 9, 1880; both were born in Harrisburg.

On January 21, 1892, Nead married (second) Annie Elizabeth Zollinger, daughter of Nicholas and Maria (Gilbert) Zollinger, of Harrisburg. Annie Nead died October 25, 1906.

In 1921, Nead suffered a "nervous breakdown" which forced him to retire from active life and return to his boyhood home at Chambersburg. There, his surviving sisters cared for him until his death on March 31, 1923. He lies buried in Harrisburg Cemetery.

== Honors ==
In June 1917, Franklin & Marshall College conferred upon B. M. Nead the honorary degree of Doctor of Literature when he delivered the commencement address to the graduating class of that institution.

In 2011, Antietam Historical Association created the B. M. Nead Fellowship, a lifetime honorary fellowship recognizing a significant contribution to Antietam History. The recipient is entitled to style himself "B. M. Nead Fellow of Antietam Historical Association."
