= Whitefield House and Gray Cottage =

Historic house in Pennsylvania, United States

- U.S. National Register of Historic Places
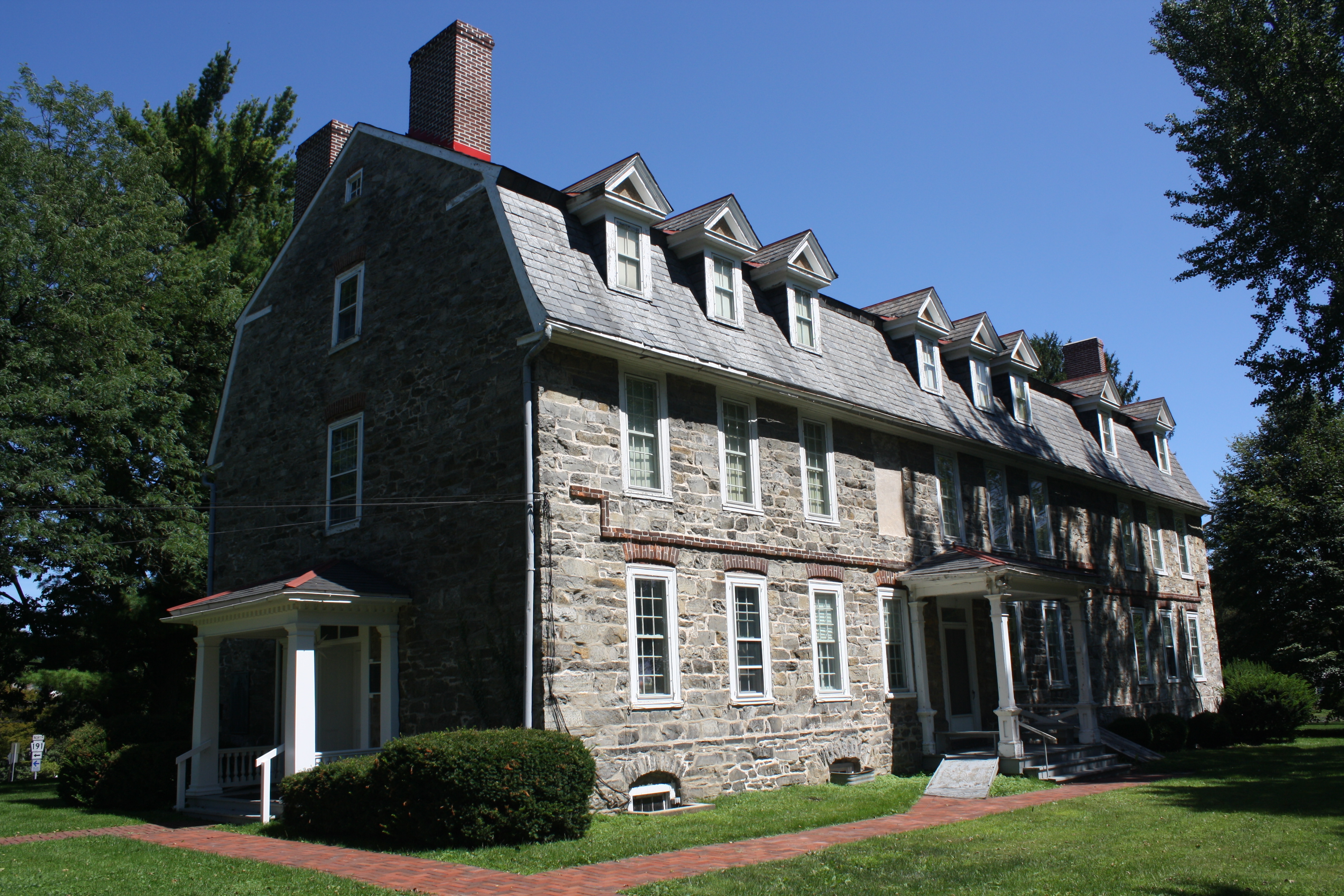
- Whitefield House. August 2013.

- Location within Pennsylvania Location within the United States
- Location: 214 E. Center St., Nazareth, Pennsylvania
- Coordinates: 40°44′28″N 75°18′28″W
- Area: 2.7 acres (1.1 ha)
- Built: 1740
- Architect: Boehler, Rev. Peter; Et al.
- NRHP reference No.: 80003589
- Added to NRHP: May 1, 1980

The Whitefield House and Gray Cottage are two historic homes on the Ephrata Tract in Nazareth, Northampton County, Pennsylvania. Construction on both buildings began in 1740, by Moravian settlers who moved to Nazareth after the failure of their mission to Native Americans and Europeans in the Savannah, Georgia area, 1735–1740. The two structures were added to the National Register of Historic Places on May 1, 1980. The Ephrata Tract and its buildings are owned by the Moravian Historical Society, and act as the Society's headquarters.

== 1740/1743 Whitefield House ==
The Whitefield House is a stone building measuring 56 feet long and 35 feet wide. It is named for George Whitefield (1714–1770), who hired a group of Moravians from Georgia to build the house as a school for orphaned slaves. Only a foundation was built however, after theological disputes between Whitefield and the Moravians caused the group to purchase the town of Bethlehem, Pennsylvania. It was here they established a Moravian community. When Whitefield went bankrupt, the Moravians purchased 5000 acres of land from him, which would later become the town of Nazareth. They completed the Whitefield House in 1743, just in time for it to be used as a home for 32 couples coming over from England. The house has been in Moravian hands for years, and has operated as a place of worship, boarding school, place for mission work, nursery, the Moravian Theological Seminary, and apartments for furloughed missionaries. Currently, the Moravian Historical Society uses the building as its historical museum, administrative offices, and gift shop.

=== French and Indian War ===
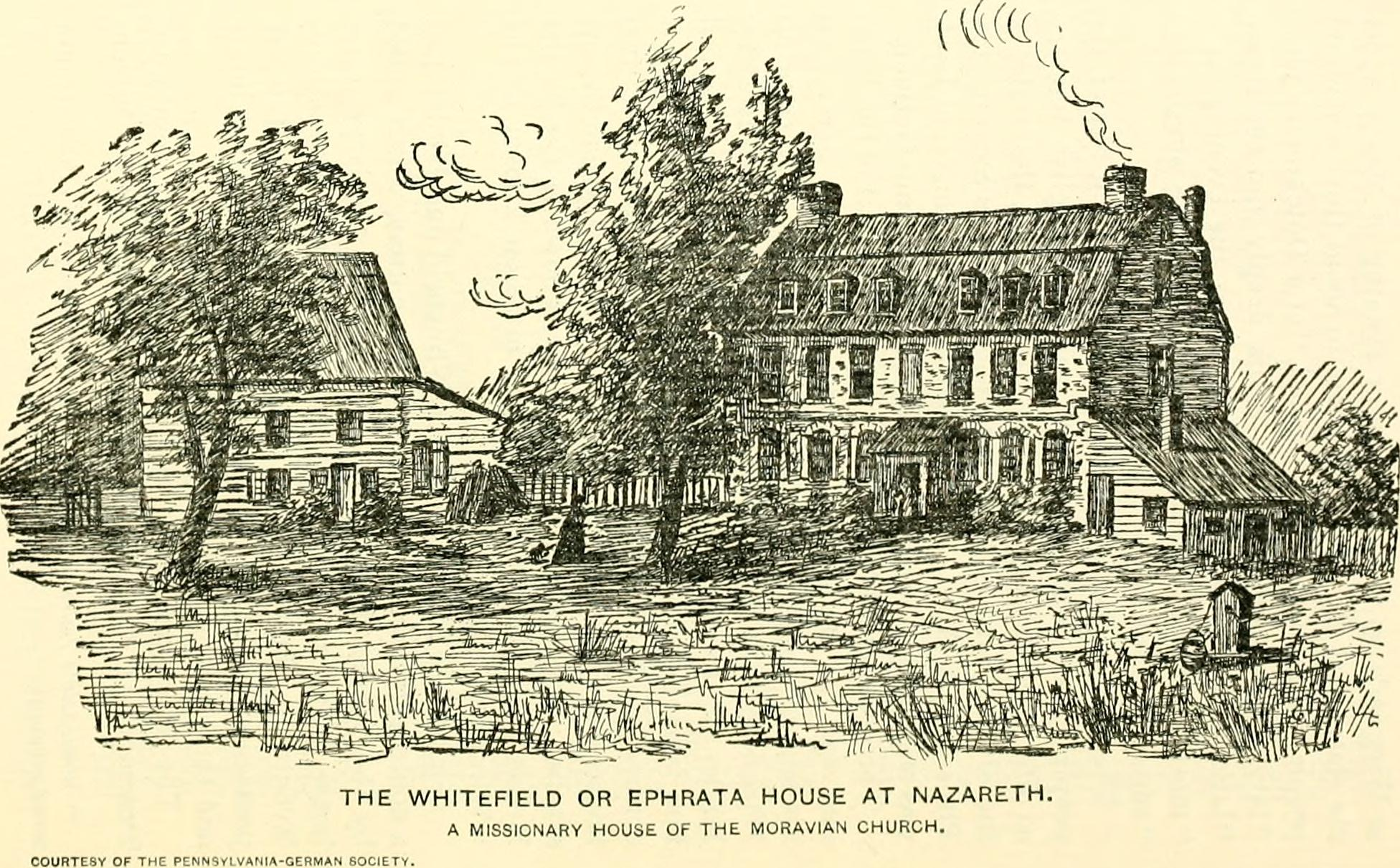
Whitefield House and Gray Cottage in 1899.

Whitefield House was briefly fortified with a stockade and sentry boxes from 1756 to 1758, to protect people fleeing from the Gnadenhütten massacre and the Northampton massacre in late 1755. By January 29, 1756, 253 refugees were living at Whitefield, including a number of Lenape Moravian converts. The stockade was 236 feet long by 170 feet wide, and 10 feet high, and protected two log houses and a cattle yard as well as Whitefield House. Sentry boxes at the gate were built of fire-resistant green logs chinked with clay. Construction began in February 1756 and was completed in May. Captain Isaac Wayne and a company of soldiers were briefly posted in Nazareth, but after the stockade was built, local settlers and the Moravian Indians kept watch. The so-called "Nazareth stockade" was probably dismantled after hostilities ended following the Treaty of Easton in October 1758.

== 1740 Gray Cottage ==
The Gray Cottage is a 1 1/2-story log building with a wood shake covered gable roof. Its name possibly comes from its aged gray coloring. It was restored in 1971 to be used as a private residence, and it is the oldest American Moravian building still standing. The log house was built in October 1740 by the Moravians to shelter themselves during the winter. The building has been used a boys' and girls' school, a choir house for widows, and a nursery. The Moravian Historical Society owns and maintains the building, and rents it out to tenants.

== Gallery ==
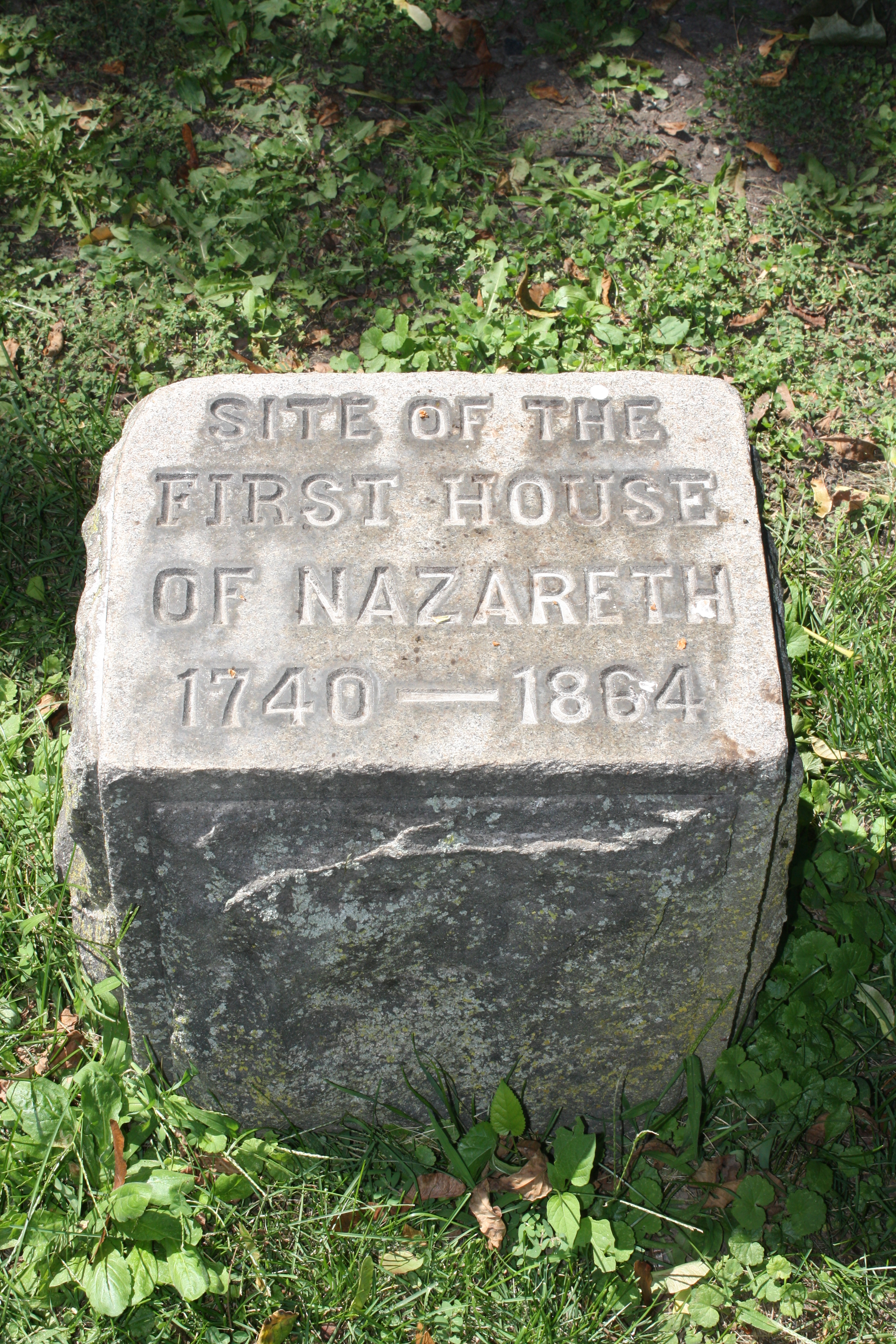
Site of the First House of Nazareth (1740-1864).

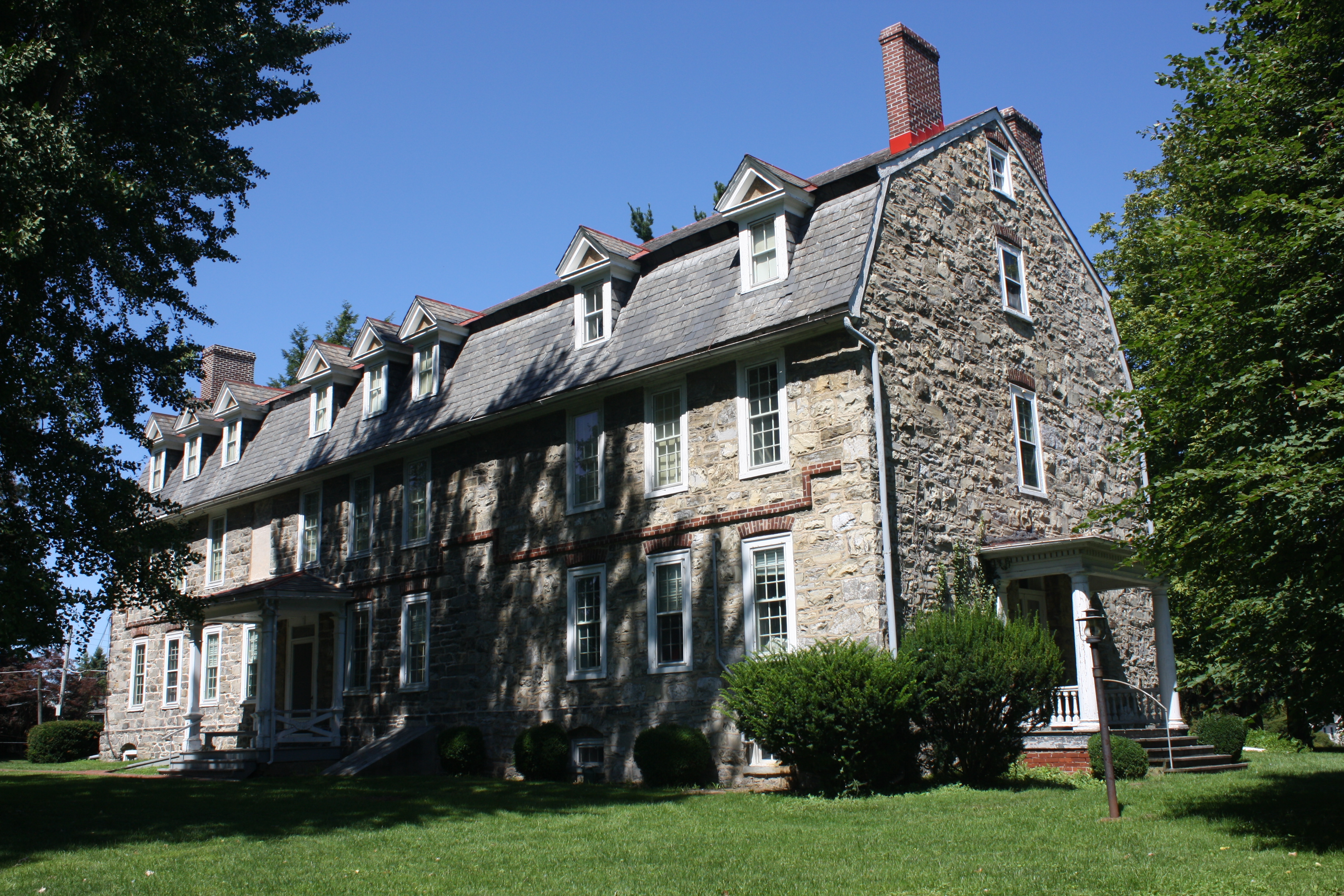
Whitefield House.

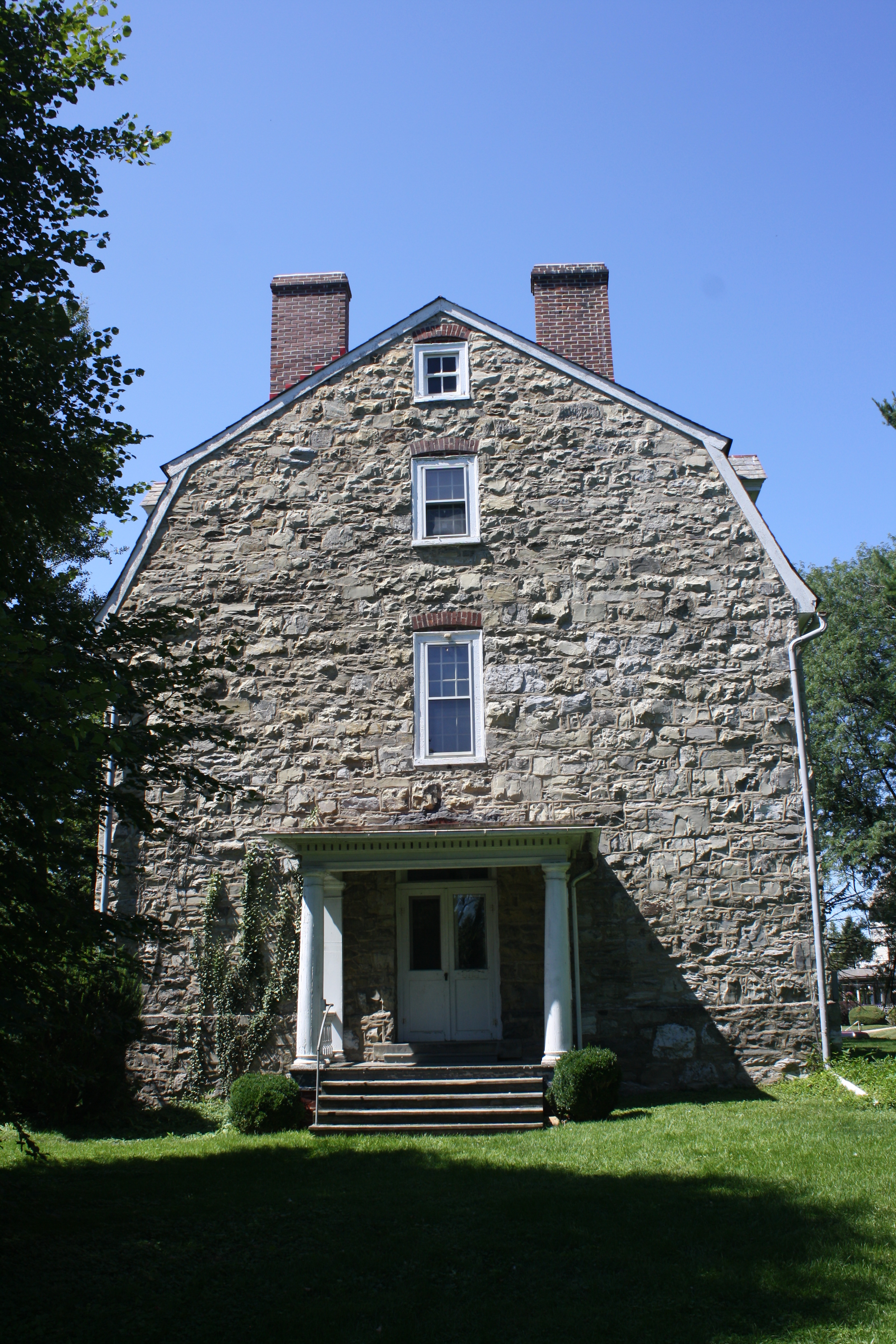
Southern side.

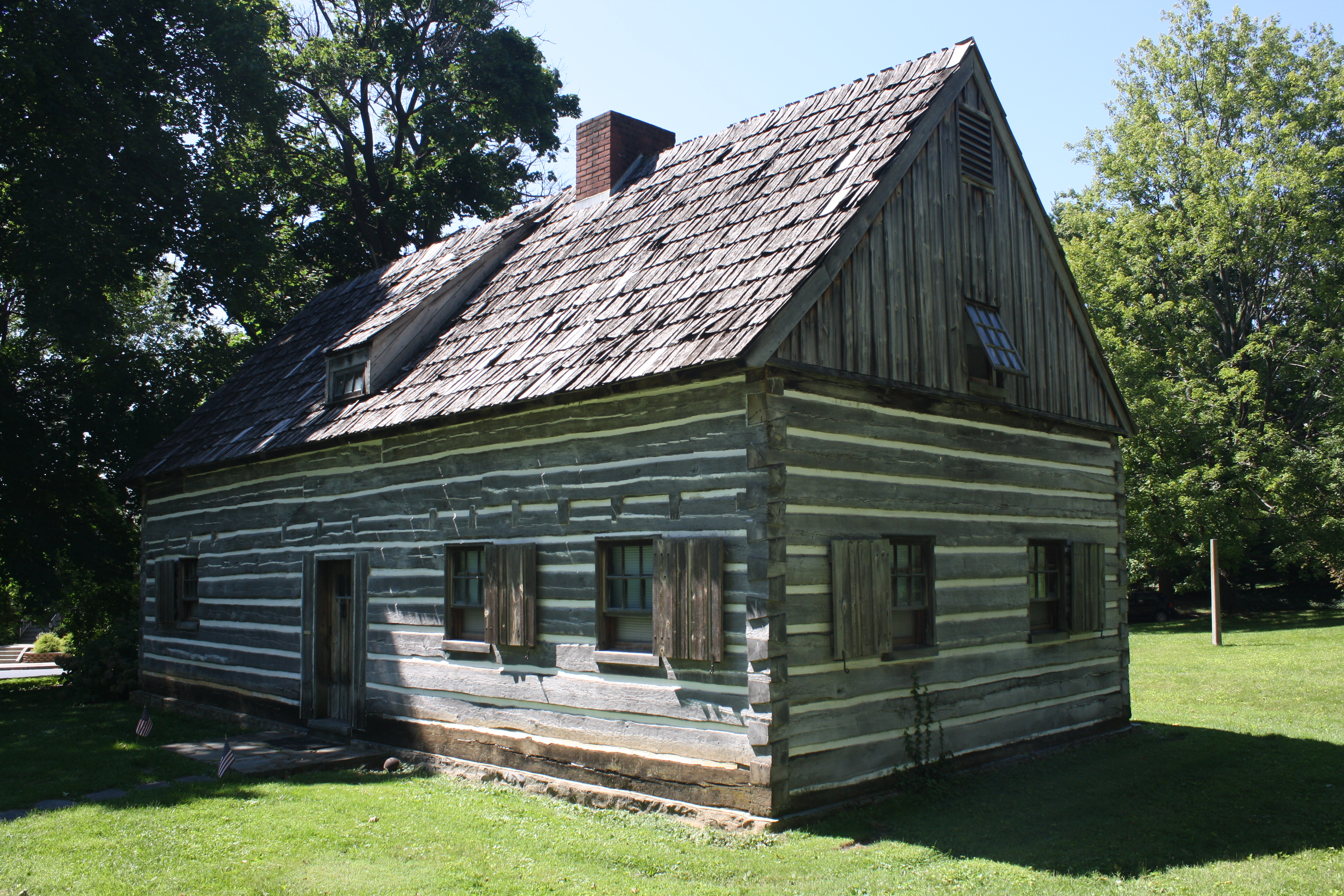
Gray Cottage.

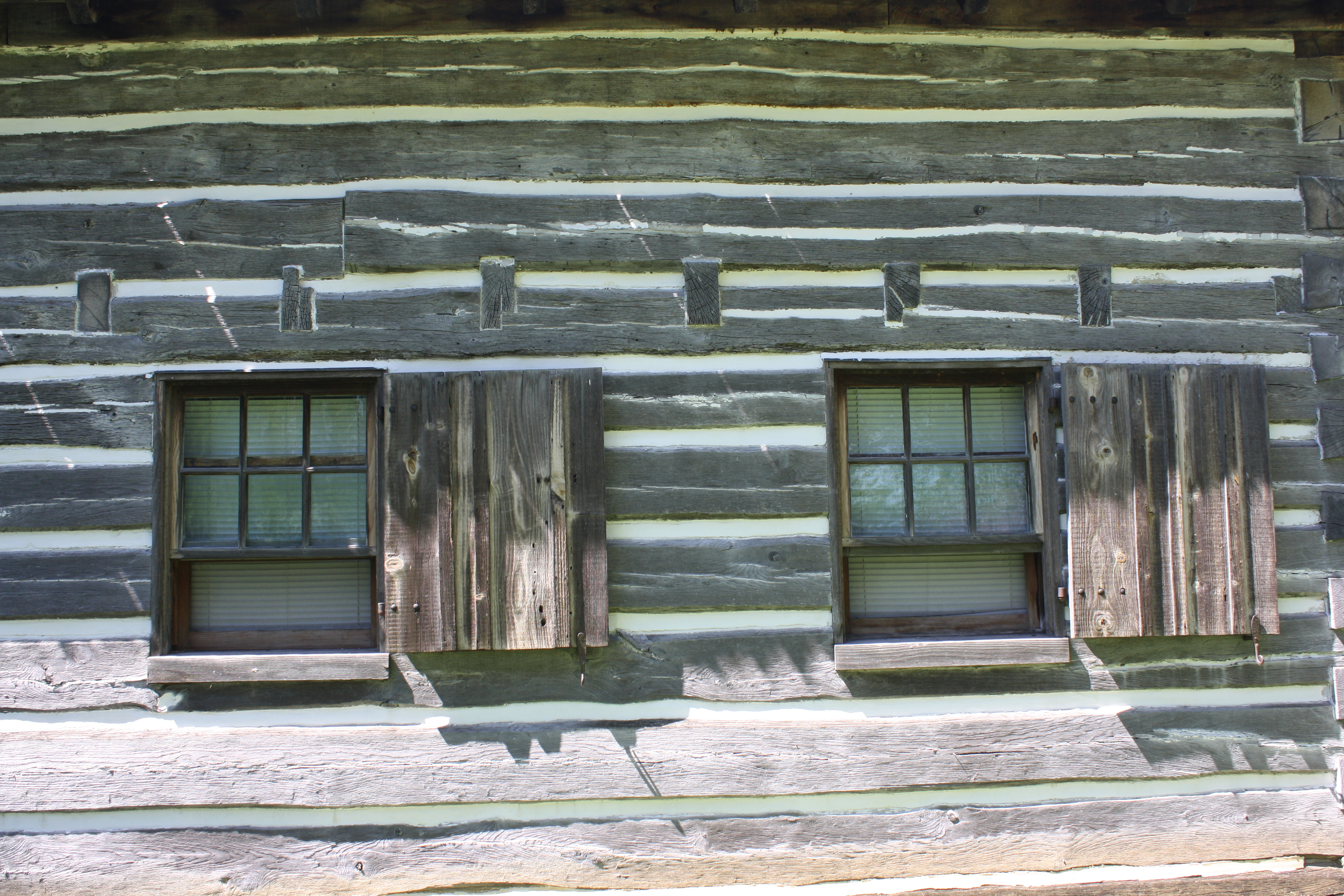
Gray Cottage windows.
