= Antietam Historical Association =

Antietam Historical Association ("AHA") is a not-for-profit educational organization founded June 20, 2006. It processes information about the Antietam country of Maryland and Pennsylvania through both traditional and digital means. AHA gathers and strives to protect historical information and images pertaining to its field of study. Then it interprets and disseminates this information, with an emphasis on scholarly publications and fun events.

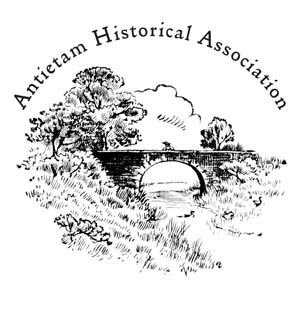
Antietam Historical Assn Logo

== Mission ==
The Association's mission is to interpret the history of the region in Maryland and Pennsylvania drained by Antietam Creek and its tributaries. It pursues this mission through print publications, a website, a Facebook page, direct interaction with researchers, digital image archives, study groups, and an annual meeting featuring a scholarly presentation concerning some pertinent historical topic.

== Organization ==
AHA is headquartered at Waynesboro, Pennsylvania, and was incorporated under the laws of the Commonwealth of Pennsylvania on October 11, 2006.

=== Fellowships ===
AHA is a non-member, non-stock corporation. In keeping with its emphasis on historical scholarship, it acknowledges its supporters by naming them "fellows" of the Association. AHA grants both regular and honorary fellowships.

==== Regular Fellowships ====
Regular fellowships represent monetary support. The highest levels of these are named in memory of pioneer philanthropists of the Antietam country. To date, four categories of regular fellowships have been created:

- Marion P. Grove Fellows;
- J. H. Stoner Fellows;
- Household Fellows; and
- Individual Fellows.

==== Honorary Fellowships ====
Honorary fellowships represent scholarship. Each honorary fellowship is a lifetime grant to one person. To date, two honorary fellowships have been created:

- The B. M. Nead Fellowship recognizes significant literary contributions to Antietam History. It is named for Benjamin Matthias Nead, Pennsylvania historian, author, lawyer, and politician. Todd Andrew Dorsett is the B. M. Nead Fellow of Antietam Historical Association.
- The Herbert C. Bell Fellowship recognizes a quest for accuracy in Antietam History. It is named for Herbert Charles Bell (1868-1935), professional historian, who was a native of the district around Leitersburg, Maryland, in the Antietam country. His book History of Leitersburg District is considered one of the most accurate and objective contributions to Antietam History. John Clinton Frye is the Herbert C. Bell Fellow of Antietam Historical Association.

== The Hereditary Societies of Waynesboro ==
AHA sponsors The Hereditary Societies of Waynesboro, which recognize living descendants of selected persons who made significant contributions in Antietam history. To date, the following hereditary societies have been inaugurated:

- Alexander Mack Society, recognizing descendants of Alexander Mack, the founder of the Church of the Brethren;
- Captain Thomas Wallace Society, recognizing descendants of militiamen on the rolls of Captain Thomas Wallace for the years 1789 and 1790;
- Captain John E. Walker Society, recognizing descendants of any person who served on either side of the American Civil War while residing in the Antietam country of Pennsylvania; and
- James Burns Society, recognizing descendants of men who were enrolled in either of the companies raised at Waynesboro for service during the War of 1812.

Membership in The Hereditary Societies of Waynesboro is by application. Applicants need to provide documentary proof of descent from a qualifying ancestor. If approved for membership, the applicant is presented with a certificate evidencing acceptance, and is placed on the rolls of the Hereditary Societies.

== Publications ==
- The fourth volume of Antietam Heritage (2019) includes "The Artful Dr. Lechler," by Jean Woods; "The Thanksgiving Day Football Game of 1936" and "R. J. Hamilton and Pilduzer Park," both by T. A. Dorsett; "A Century of Fashion," by Marcia Yingling Schwuchow; "Modern Mysteries of an Ancient Family Burying Ground," by Scott K. Parker, and other local matter.
- The Vanishing Dice Murder: Urban Crime in Rural Pennsylvania, by Stephen Kulla (2019) is a defense attorney's recountal of a 1995 homicide in Franklin county, Pennsylvania, the ensuing police investigation, and the resulting 2015 murder trial.
- The third volume of Antietam Heritage (2018) includes "Walter Reed, Yellow Fever, and Blue Ridge Summit," by William S. Stanley; Fraktur for Franklin County Families," by Jean Woods; "Daniel Hoover," by Marcia Yingling Schwuchow; "Escaped from Harpers Ferry, Captured at Mont Alto" and "The History of the Buena Vista Spring Hotel," both by T. A. Dorsett; "German Culture and English Styles," by Scott K. Parker; "Myth Busters," and other historical items.
- The Proceedings of the Potomac Street Irregulars (2017) recites the stories of ten local homicides and one local poison-pen case from Smithsburg, Maryland.
- The second volume of Antietam Heritage (2017) includes "A Final Farewell," by Kenneth L. Peiffer, Jr.; "My Yalow Garl Rose," by Scott K. Parker; "Family, Furniture & Fraktur," by Jean Woods; "Remembering Samantha French Brenisholtz," by Brenda Hornsby Heindl; "The Adventures of Margie Ripple—Part II"; "The Evolution of Dr. Ripple's House"; "Myth Busters"; "Potters of Waynesboro and Vicinity," by T. A. Dorsett, and other articles of local history.
- Trail of Terror: The Story of Peggy Ann Bradnick and the Mountain Man, by Kenneth L. Peiffer, Jr. (2016) is a profusely illustrated retrospective about one of the most celebrated crime sprees in American history written by a photojournalist who covered the story for the Chambersburg Public Opinion and won the Pennsylvania Newspaper Publishers' Association's top prize in 1966 for one of his on-scene photographs during what was the largest manhunt in Pennsylvania history up to that time.
- Also in 2016, AHA published the first volume of its annual hardbound magazine, Antietam Heritage, which contains articles covering a variety of topics in Antietam history, including "William H. Singer, Jr.," by Jean Woods; "Knepper Station," by T. A. Dorsett; "Sharpsburg and the Battlefield Farms," by Ted Alexander; a history of the Mason and Dixon line by Scott K. Parker, and a piece by T. A. Dorsett titled "A Dubious Distinction," which ponders whether Secretary of War Simon Cameron was born at Waynesboro or at Maytown, Pennsylvania.
- In 2014 AHA published the first volume of the proceedings of its crime study group, the Potomac Street Irregulars, which discusses more than one dozen crimes in local history from the Eighteenth to the Twentieth century.
- "Waynesboro As We Knew It," by T. A. Dorsett (2012) is a large, illustrated collection of reminiscences, diary and journal entries, letters, and anecdotes which relate the history of Waynesboro, Pennsylvania, from the perspective of the author's family and their friends and neighbors.
- In 2011 AHA published Waynesboro During the Civil War, a collection of narratives, newspaper accounts, and reminiscences chronicling the lives of the inhabitants of a border town during the War between the States, 1861-65.
- In 2010 AHA and Little Antietam Creek, Inc., co-published "A Walking Tour of Downtown Waynesboro."
- The Association also publishes a newsletter, The Rivulet, "every little now and then."

== Study Groups ==
AHA sponsors three study groups which meet at stated intervals for informal exploration of local history.

=== The Potomac Street Irregulars ===
The Potomac Street Irregulars (PSI) meet the second Tuesday of every month to study crime in Antietam History. The group's name is borrowed from the Sherlock Holmes stories by Sir Arthur Conan Doyle, in which Holmes engages the services of a group of street urchins to gather information for him. He called his urchins the "Baker Street Irregulars." Likewise, the history group's nickname, "PSI," is a parody of the titles of popular crime-fighting television shows. The PSI format is to dine together, followed by the presentation by one member (called the "lead detective") of his findings about a given case. The discussion then opens for input from all in attendance. This group has enjoyed great popularity since its inauguration in January 2013, based largely on its study of the unsolved murder cases of Samuel Shockey (1928) and Miss Betty Jane Kennedy (1946).

=== Antietam Ramblers ===
The Antietam Ramblers take field trips to natural and historic places in the Antietam country and contiguous regions. The stated frequency of rambles is quarterly; however, weather and other considerations have caused the group to travel less frequently during its first year. To date, the group have visited the site of the Blue Mountain House, on the Western Maryland Railroad and the Appalachian Trail near Pen-Mar, Maryland; the sites of distilleries in the watershed of the east branch of Antietam creek; and the Cascades on Falls creek, near Cascade, Maryland.

=== Third Thursday Biography Breakfast ===
In 2014 AHA inaugurated "Third Thursday Biography Breakfast" (TTBB) to study deceased local residents who are not already history-book celebrities. TTBB meets the third Thursday of every month, to eat breakfast and hold informal, roundtable discussions. Mrs. Rachael Patterson Green, Benjamin Tarman, Christian Welty Good, and "My Yellow Garl Rose" are among the topics thus far explored.

== See also ==
- List of historical societies in Pennsylvania
