= Harbaugh's Reformed Church =

Historic church in Pennsylvania, United States

- U.S. National Register of Historic Places
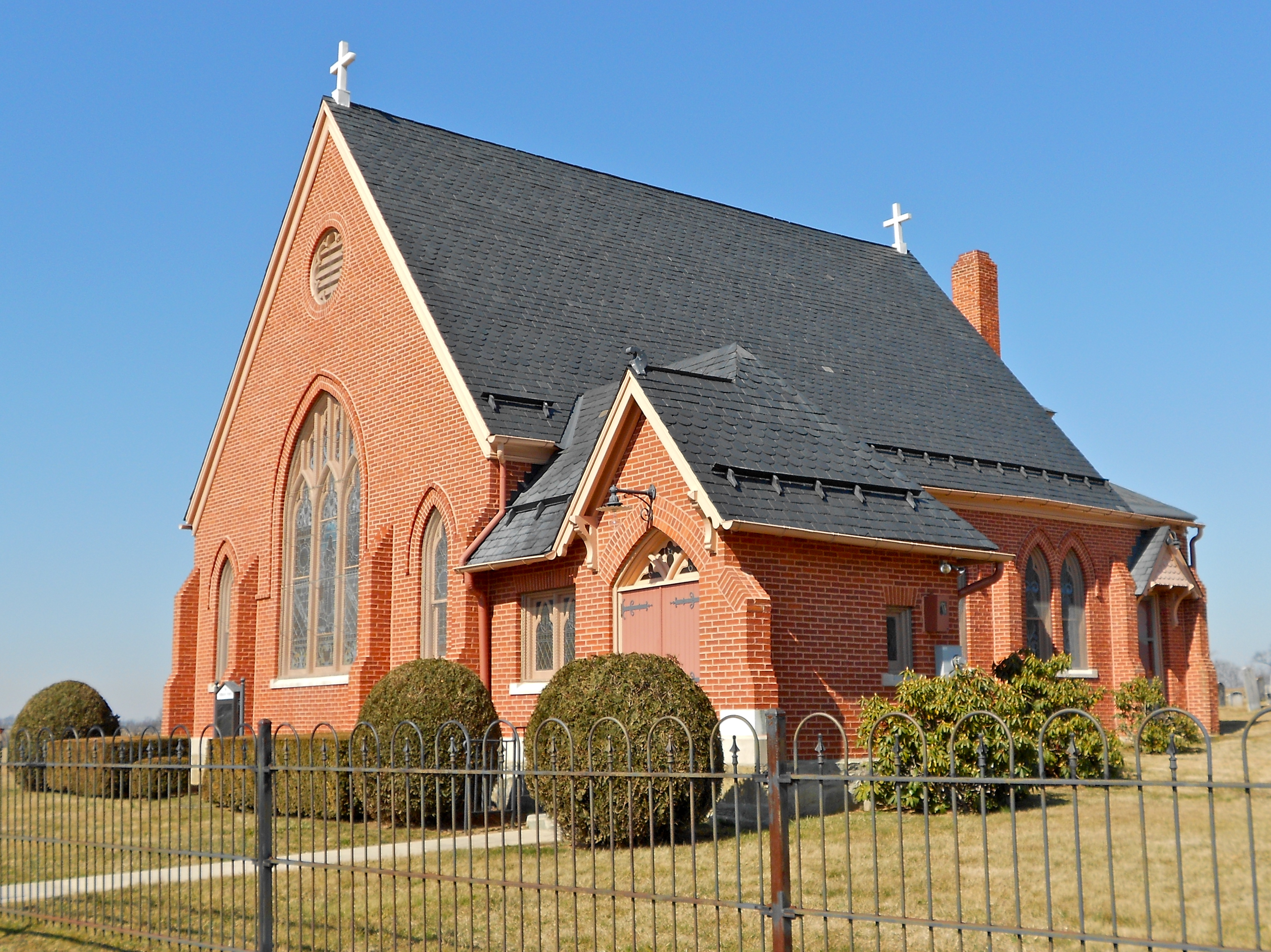
- Harbaugh Church, February 2012

- Location within Pennsylvania Location within the United States
- Location: 14301 and 14269 Harbaugh Church Rd., Washington Township, Pennsylvania
- Coordinates: 39°43′16″N 77°32′2″W
- Area: 4 acres (1.6 ha)
- Built: 1892
- Architectural style: Late Gothic Revival
- NRHP reference No.: 02000228
- Added to NRHP: March 20, 2002

Harbaugh's Reformed Church, now non-denominational and known as Harbaugh Church, is an historic Reformed church which is located at 14301 and 14269 Harbaugh Church Road in Washington Township, Franklin County, Pennsylvania.

It was added to the National Register of Historic Places in 2002.

== History and architectural features ==
This historic church building is one of five properties owned by The Waynesboro Historical Society and is available for weddings, funerals and special events. Built in 1892, it is a 1 1/2-story, three-bay-by-five-bay, brick Late Gothic Revival-style building, which features a steep, slate covered gable roof, brick buttresses, and lancet stained glass windows.

The building replaced an earlier church that was built in 1846 by George Harbaugh on farmland he owned.

The property includes the church cemetery, which was established circa 1845. Regular services were held in the current building until 1966. It was acquired by the historical society in 1983.
