= Harbach (surname) =

Harbach is a surname. Notable people with the surname include:

- Barbara Harbach (born 1946), American composer, harpsichordist and organist
- Chad Harbach (born 1975), American writer
- Otto Harbach (1873–1963), American songwriter
- William O. Harbach (1919-2017), American television producer
