= Don Heffner =

American baseball player, coach, and manager (1911–1989)

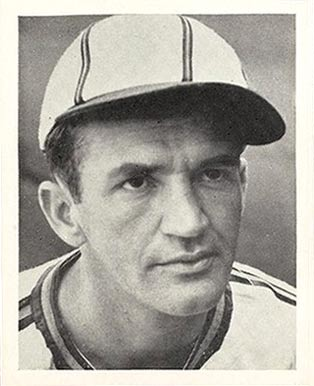
- Second baseman / Manager
- Born: February 8, 1911; Rouzerville, Pennsylvania, U.S.
- Died: August 1, 1989 (aged 78); Pasadena, California, U.S.
- Batted: Right Threw: Right

MLB debut
- April 17, 1934, for the New York Yankees

Last MLB appearance
- April 29, 1944, for the Detroit Tigers

MLB statistics
- Batting average: .241
- Home runs: 6
- Runs batted in: 248
- Managerial record: 37–46
- Winning %: .446
- Stats at Baseball Reference

Teams
- As player: New York Yankees (1934–1937); St. Louis Browns (1938–1943); Philadelphia Athletics (1943); Detroit Tigers (1944); As manager: Cincinnati Reds (1966); As coach: Kansas City Athletics (1958–1960); Detroit Tigers (1961); New York Mets (1964–1965); California Angels (1967–1968)

Career highlights and awards
- World Series champion (1936)

Donald Henry Heffner (February 8, 1911 – August 1, 1989) was an American second baseman, coach and manager in Major League Baseball. Born in Rouzerville, Pennsylvania, he threw and batted right-handed, and was listed as 5 feet 10 inches (1.78 m) tall and 155 pounds (70 kg).

== Player and coach ==
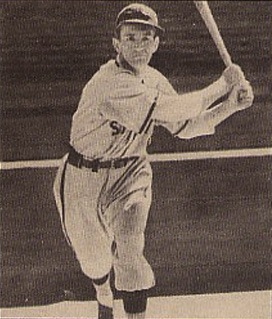
Heffner in 1940

Heffner entered professional baseball in 1929. After all or parts of four seasons with the then-minor league Baltimore Orioles, Heffner joined the New York Yankees for the 1934 season. He spent four seasons with the Yanks as a part-time player before a trade to the St. Louis Browns afforded him an opportunity to play regularly. He appeared in more than 100 games from 1938 to 1941 with St. Louis, including regular stints at second base (1938; 1940–41) and shortstop (1939), before reverting to a reserve role. He finished his playing career with the Philadelphia Athletics and Detroit Tigers in 1943–44. In 743 games over all or parts of 11 American League seasons (1934–44), Heffner batted .241 with six home runs and 610 hits.

In 1947, he began his managing career in the Browns' farm system, and he promptly won consecutive pennants in his first two seasons. He returned to the Major Leagues as a coach with the Athletics, now based in Kansas City, in 1958–60 and the Tigers in 1961. Heffner then spent two successful seasons managing the San Diego Padres of the Pacific Coast League, winning the 1962 league championship, before becoming third-base coach of the New York Mets in 1964–65.

== Managing and coaching ==
In October 1965, he succeeded Dick Sisler as manager of the Cincinnati Reds. Heffner was hired by longtime associate Bill DeWitt, the Reds' owner and general manager who was the front office boss of the Browns during Heffner's playing days.

The Reds were a first division finisher in 1965 and hopes were high for a pennant run the following year—especially after DeWitt added front-line starting pitcher Milt Pappas in a blockbuster trade with Baltimore involving former National League most valuable player Frank Robinson. But while the Orioles roared to the AL pennant and world championship in 1966, the Reds never got on track under their new skipper. Heffner tried to convert all-star second baseman Pete Rose into a third baseman, only to draw the popular star's wrath. (Oddly, Rose would later willingly become a third baseman for Sparky Anderson). The Reds struggled to reach the .500 mark during the season's first three months, and finally peaked at 36–35 on June 28. Cincinnati then proceeded to lose 11 games in a row. They broke their losing streak in the last game before the All-Star break on July 10.

But it was too late to save Heffner's job. With Cincinnati in eighth place in the National League with a record of 37–46 (.446) on July 13, Heffner was released in favor of Dave Bristol, who was serving as his third-base coach.

Heffner never again managed in the Major Leagues. He spent 1967–68 as a California Angels coach and 1969 as manager of the Denver Bears of the American Association.

== Personal life ==
Heffner died at age 78 in Pasadena, California from pneumonia. He was interred at Mountain View Cemetery and Mausoleum in Altadena.

Sporting positions
Preceded by Solly Hemus	New York Mets third-base coach 1964–1965	Succeeded by Whitey Herzog
