= Zullinger, Pennsylvania =

Unincorporated community in Pennsylvania, US

- Unincorporated community
- Location within Pennsylvania
- Coordinates: 39°46′12″N 77°37′47″W
- Country: United States
- State: Pennsylvania
- County: Franklin
- Elevation: 745 ft (227 m)
- Time zone: UTC-5 (Eastern (EST))
  - Summer (DST): UTC-4 (EDT)
- ZIP code: 17272
- Area codes: 223 & 717
- GNIS feature ID: 1192033

Zullinger is an unincorporated community in Washington Township, Franklin County, Pennsylvania, United States. The community is located along Pennsylvania Route 16, 2.9 miles (4.7 km) west-northwest of Waynesboro. Zullinger has a post office, with ZIP code 17272.
