= Springdale Mills =

- U.S. National Register of Historic Places
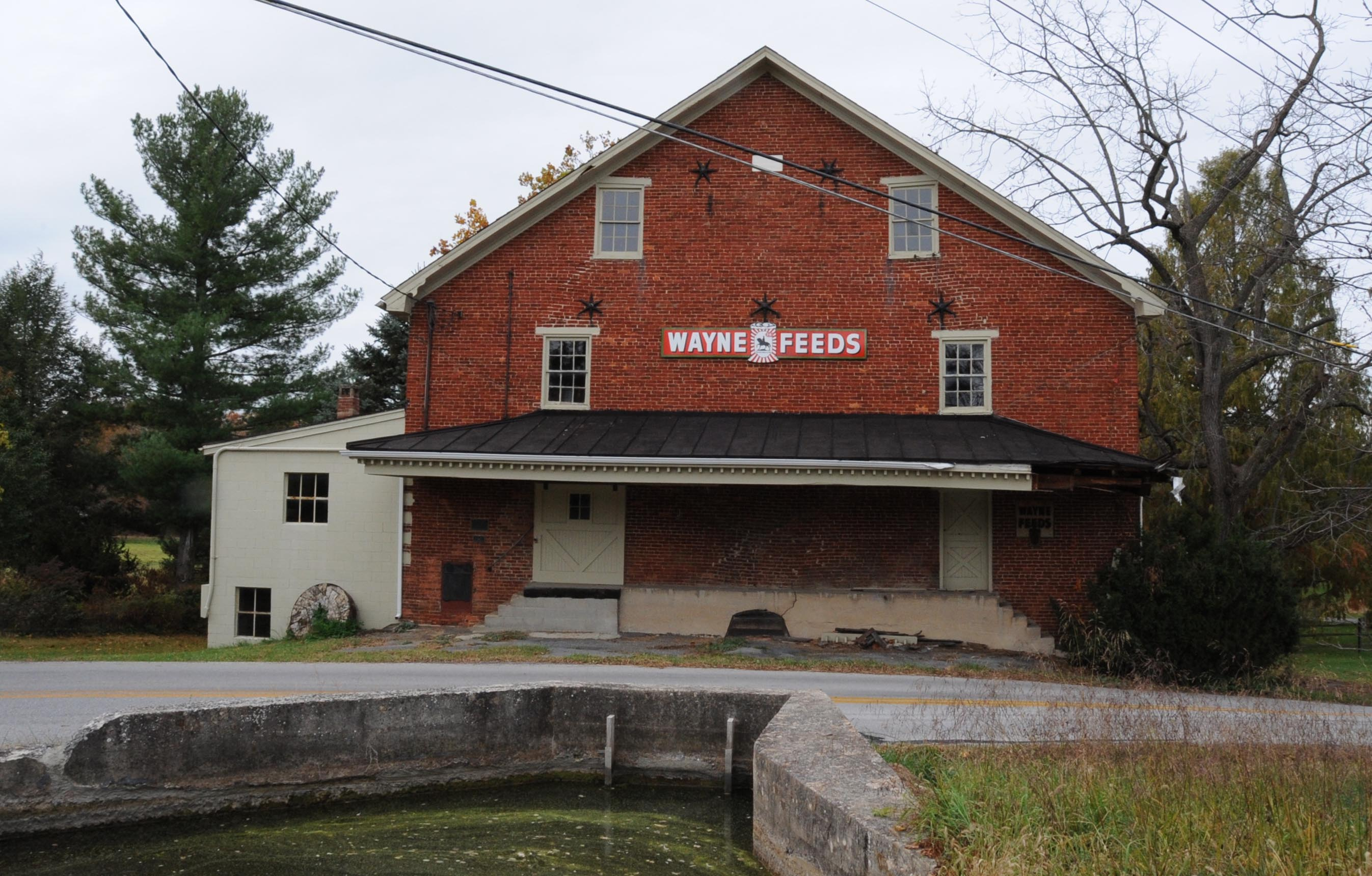

- Location within Pennsylvania Location within the United States
- Location: Southeast of Waynesboro off Pennsylvania Route 16 on Amsterdam Road, Washington Township, Pennsylvania
- Coordinates: 39°44′5″N 77°32′56″W
- Area: 6 acres (2.4 ha)
- Built: 1857
- NRHP reference No.: 75001642
- Added to NRHP: September 18, 1975

Springdale Mills, also known as Shank's Mill and Shockey Mills, is a historic grist mill located at Washington Township in Franklin County, Pennsylvania. It was built in 1857, and is a 3 1/-2-story, banked brick building with a fieldstone foundation. A 24-foot diameter Fitz overshot wheel was installed between 1900 and 1910.

It was listed on the National Register of Historic Places in 1975.
