= Antietam Creek =

Creek in Pennsylvania and Maryland, US

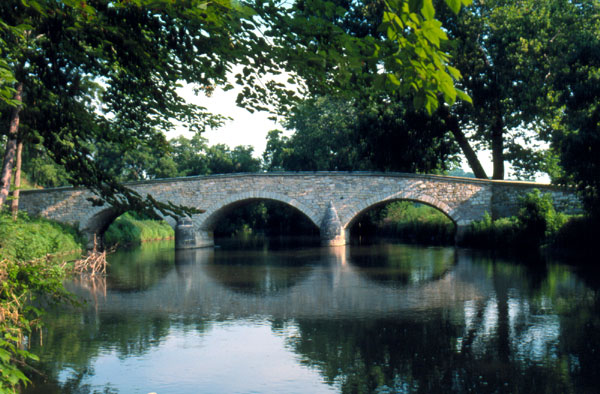
- Burnside's Bridge traversing Antietam Creek near Sharpsburg, Maryland, site of heavy combat during the Battle of Antietam (Sharpsburg) on September 17, 1862

- Location of mouth in Maryland

Location
- Country: United States
- States: Maryland, Pennsylvania

Physical characteristics
- Mouth
  - coordinates: 39°25′02″N 77°44′47″W
- Length: 41.7 mi (67.1 km)
- Basin size: 290 km^{2} (110 sq mi)

Basin features
- River system: Potomac River

Antietam Creek (/ænˈtiːtəm/) is a 41.7-mile-long (67.1 km) tributary of the Potomac River located in south central Pennsylvania and western Maryland in the United States, a region known as the Hagerstown Valley. The creek became famous as a focal point of the Battle of Antietam during the American Civil War.

== Geography ==
The creek is formed in Franklin County, Pennsylvania, at the confluence of the West and East Branches of Antietam Creek, about 2.3 miles (3.7 km) south of Waynesboro, Pennsylvania. Welty's Mill Bridge crosses the East Branch of Little Antietam at Washington Township in Franklin County, Pennsylvania. The stream runs for about 0.5 miles (0.80 km) upon its entering Washington County, Maryland. The course proceeds southward in a meandering pattern, and the creek empties into the Potomac south of Sharpsburg about 50 miles (80 km) upstream of Washington.

The watershed area is 290 square miles (750 km^{2}) and includes parts of Franklin County (106 mi^{2}) and Washington County (185 mi^{2}). Major tributaries in Pennsylvania include the East and West Branches, Red Run and Falls Creek. Major tributaries in Maryland include Little Antietam Creek, Beaver Creek, and Marsh Run. Communities in the watershed include Waynesboro in Pennsylvania; and Boonsboro, Funkstown, Hagerstown, Mount Aetna, Sharpsburg and Smithsburg in Maryland.

At least four different tributaries are named Little Antietam Creek. Little Antietam Creek which empties into the Antietam in Keedysville, Maryland and another below Leitersburg, Maryland. The name Little Antietam Creek is also applied to the East and West Branch in Pennsylvania, the West Branch historically Little Antietam Creek proper. These names are listed in the United States Geological Survey as variants.

== History ==
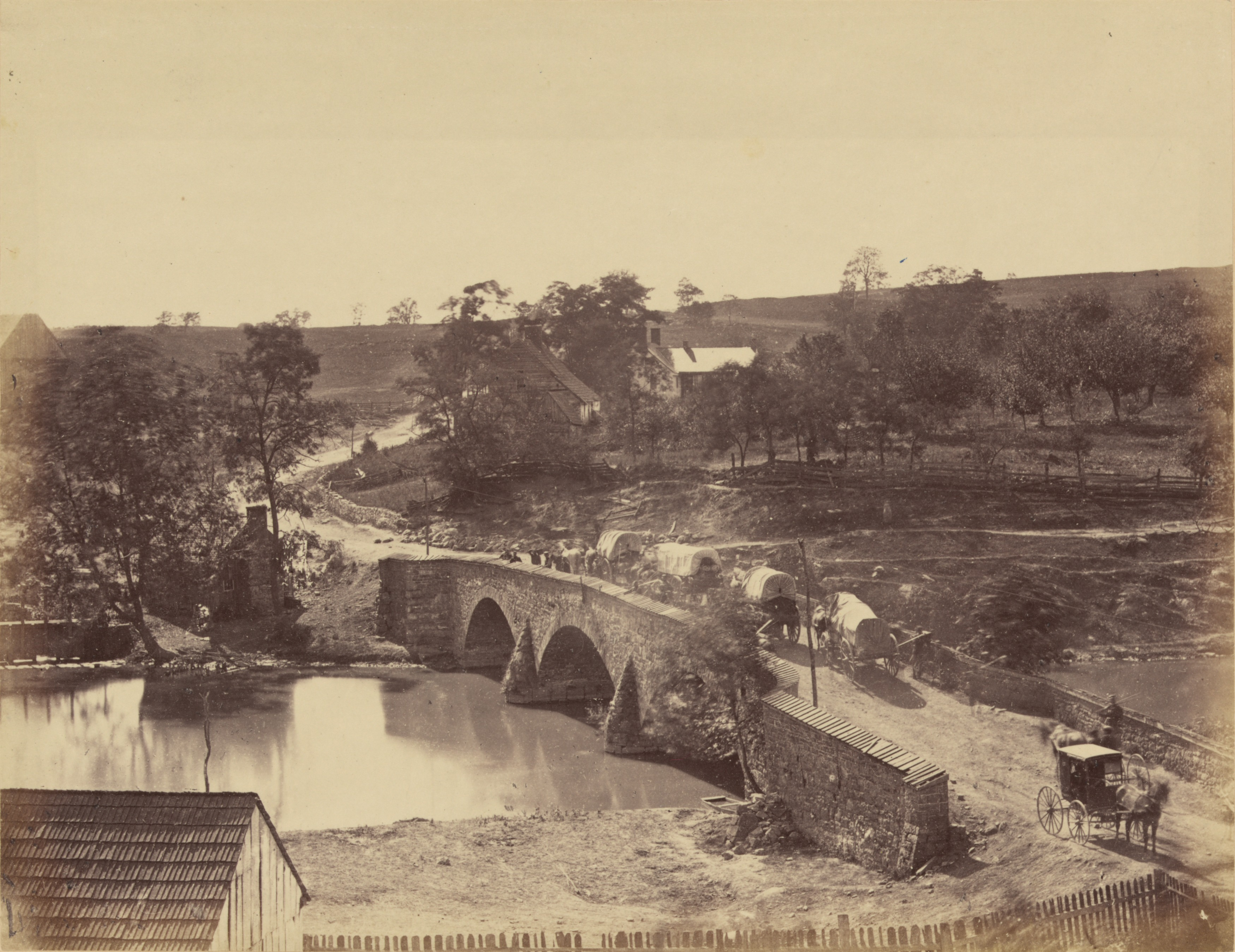
The middle bridge over Antietam Creek, also near Sharpsburg, photographed September 1862

The term "Antietam" is thought to derive from an Algonquian phrase meaning "swift-flowing stream". Historical and variant names include Andiedom, Andirton Creek, Ant-eat-em Creek, Anticturn Creek, Antieatum Creek, Crooked Brook, Odieta Creek and Ondieta Creek.

The creek is noted for numerous well-preserved stone arch bridges dating to the 19th century that still traverse the creek, the most famous of which is the 125-foot-long (38 m) Burnside's Bridge in the Antietam National Battlefield.

The creek was a major topographic feature during the Battle of Antietam or Sharpsburg, fought on September 17, 1862, near the creek's mouth. Burnside's Bridge became a major focus of combat as Union forces under General Ambrose Burnside repeatedly tried to capture the bridge from Confederate forces guarding the crossing from a high bluff overlooking the creek. The day of the battle is known as "the day Antietam Creek ran red" due to the blood of thousands of Union casualties mixing with the creek waters. Both sides lost about a fourth of their number but, despite General McClellan's refusal to press on his attacks, it served as a tactical Union victory, as Lee was forced to withdraw from Maryland.

== Development and water quality issues ==
Most of the watershed area is relatively rural in nature, but the area surrounding Hagerstown is threatened by urban sprawl. The area is also heavily cultivated, and waste runoff from farms is a growing water quality concern. The Maryland Department of the Environment (MDE) has identified farm runoff as the largest source of sediment (loose soil) in Antietam Creek and its tributaries. The second largest source is urban runoff. MDE recommends that farmers implement best management practices on their lands to control runoff, such as installing riparian buffers.

== See also ==
- List of Maryland rivers
- List of Pennsylvania rivers

== Bibliography ==
- Baynes, T. S., ed. (1878), "Antietam" , Encyclopædia Britannica, vol. 2 (9th ed.), New York: Charles Scribner's Sons, p. 127
- Chisholm, Hugh, ed. (1911), "Antietam" , Encyclopædia Britannica, vol. 2 (11th ed.), Cambridge University Press, p. 124
