= Handycraft Farmstead =

- U.S. National Register of Historic Places
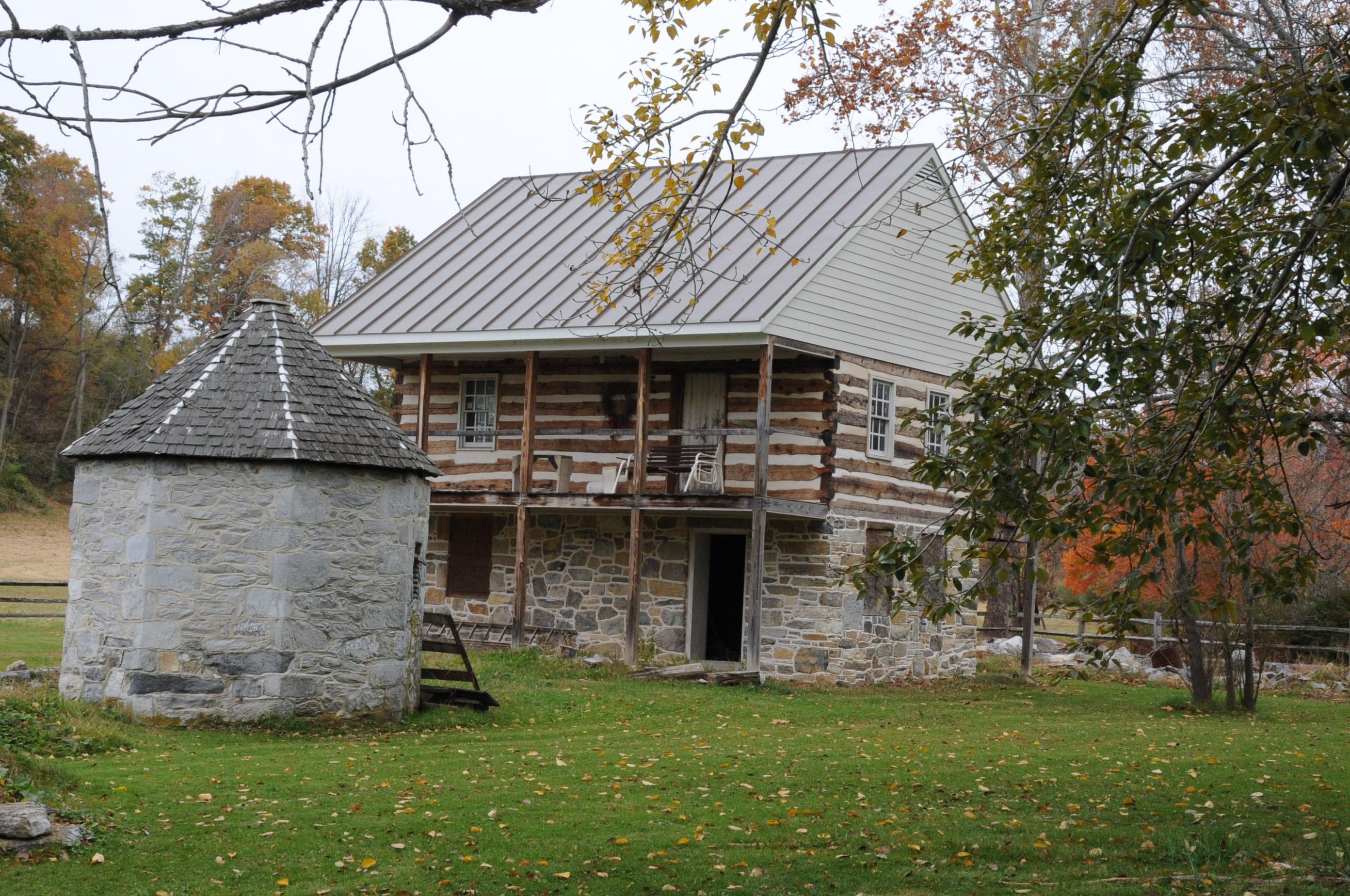

- Location within Pennsylvania Location within the United States
- Location: 11071 Country Club Rd., Washington Township, Pennsylvania
- Coordinates: 39°45′49″N 77°32′03″W
- Area: 14 acres (5.7 ha)
- Built: c. 1790
- Architectural style: Hewn Log
- NRHP reference No.: 02000893
- Added to NRHP: August 22, 2002

The Handycraft Farmstead, also known as Ewetopia, is an historic farm which is located in Washington Township in Franklin County, Pennsylvania.

It was listed on the National Register of Historic Places in 2002.

== History and architectural features ==
The contributing buildings are a hewn timber frame Pennsylvania barn, which was built sometime around 1840, a hewn log secondary house that was erected circa 1830, an octagonal stone smoke house, which was built sometime around 1830, and an animal barn/shed which dates to the late-nineteenth or early twentieth century. The main house, which was built sometime around 1790, has been substantially modified and is non-contributing.
