= Monterey Historic District =

Monterey Historic District may refer to:

- Monterey Historic District (Monterey, Kentucky), listed on the National Register of Historic Places in Owen County, Kentucky
- Monterey Historic District (Blue Ridge Summit, Pennsylvania), listed on the National Register of Historic Places in Franklin County, Pennsylvania
