= Jeremiah Burns Farm =

Historic house in Pennsylvania, United States

- U.S. National Register of Historic Places
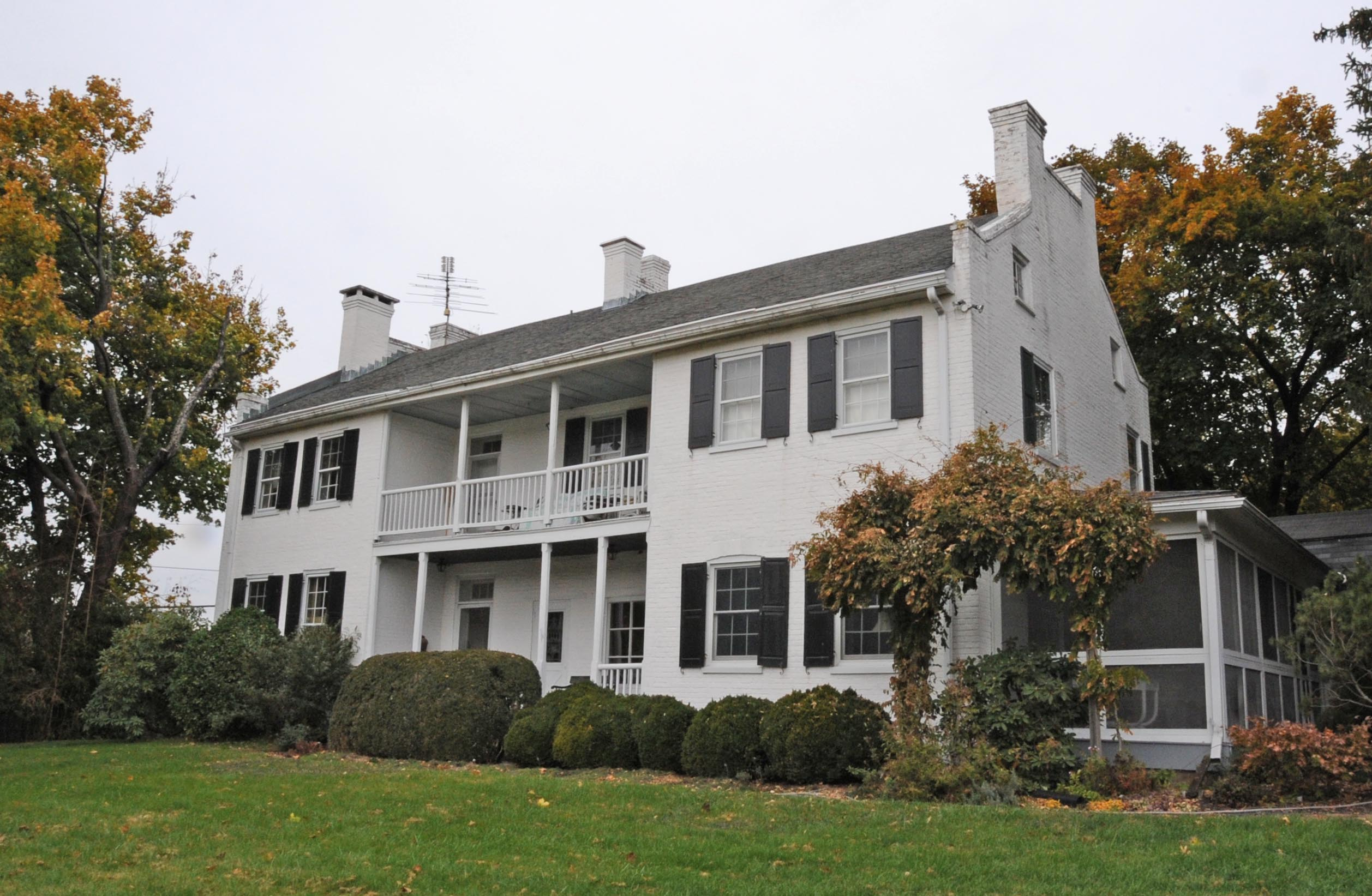

- Location within Pennsylvania Location within the United States
- Location: 10988 Fish and Game Rd., Washington Township, Pennsylvania
- Coordinates: 39°45′58″N 77°31′47″W
- Area: 0 acres (0 ha)
- Built: 1832
- Architectural style: Greek Revival, Mid 19th century vernacular
- NRHP reference No.: 02000065
- Added to NRHP: August 15, 2002

The Jeremiah Burns Farm, also known as The Burns Place, is an historic home and farm that are located in Washington Township in Franklin County, Pennsylvania, United States.

It was listed on the National Register of Historic Places in 2002.

== History and architectural features ==
The contributing buildings are the farmhouse (1832), a hewn timber frame Pennsylvania barn (c. 1900), and a small shed that date to the late-nineteenth or early twentieth-century. The property also includes the millrace and remains of a sickle mill and a line of cobblestones from the barn to the mill site. The house is a two-story, seven-bay, brick building with a central recessed double porch that was designed in a vernacular Greek Revival style.
