= Welty's Mill Bridge =

- U.S. National Register of Historic Places
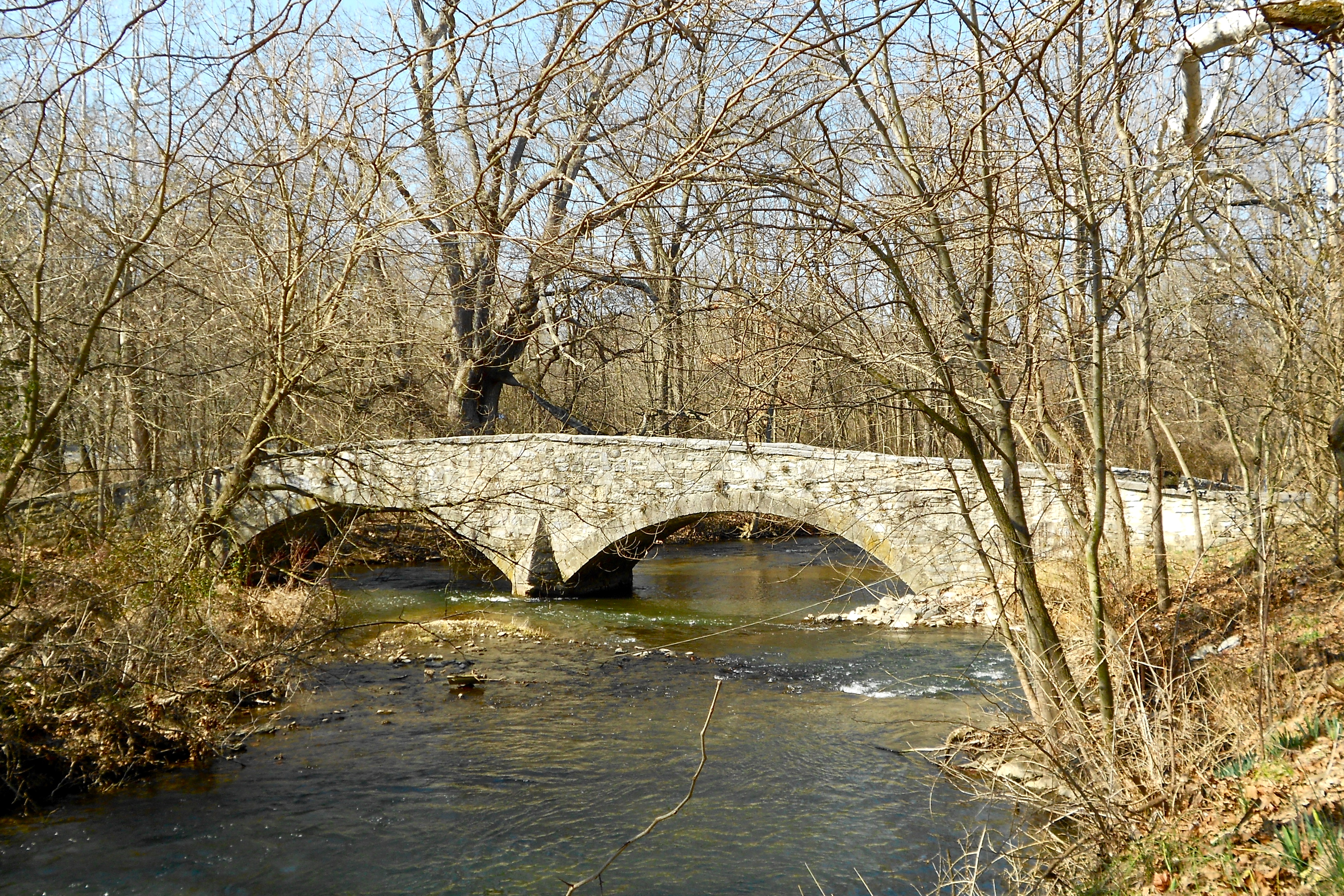
- Welty's Mill Bridge, February 2012

- Location within Pennsylvania Location within the United States
- Location: South of Waynesboro on Pennsylvania Route 997, Washington Township, Pennsylvania
- Coordinates: 39°44′16″N 77°34′20″W
- Area: 0.1 acres (0.040 ha)
- Built: 1856
- Built by: Stoner, David Snively
- NRHP reference No.: 83002246
- Added to NRHP: January 6, 1983

Welty's Mill Bridge is an historic, multi-span, stone arch bridge in Washington Township in Franklin County, Pennsylvania, United States.

It was listed on the National Register of Historic Places in 1983.

== History and architectural features ==
This historic structure is a 137-foot-long (42 m), two-arch bridge that was built in 1856 using limestone. It crosses the East Branch of Little Antietam.

== Gallery ==
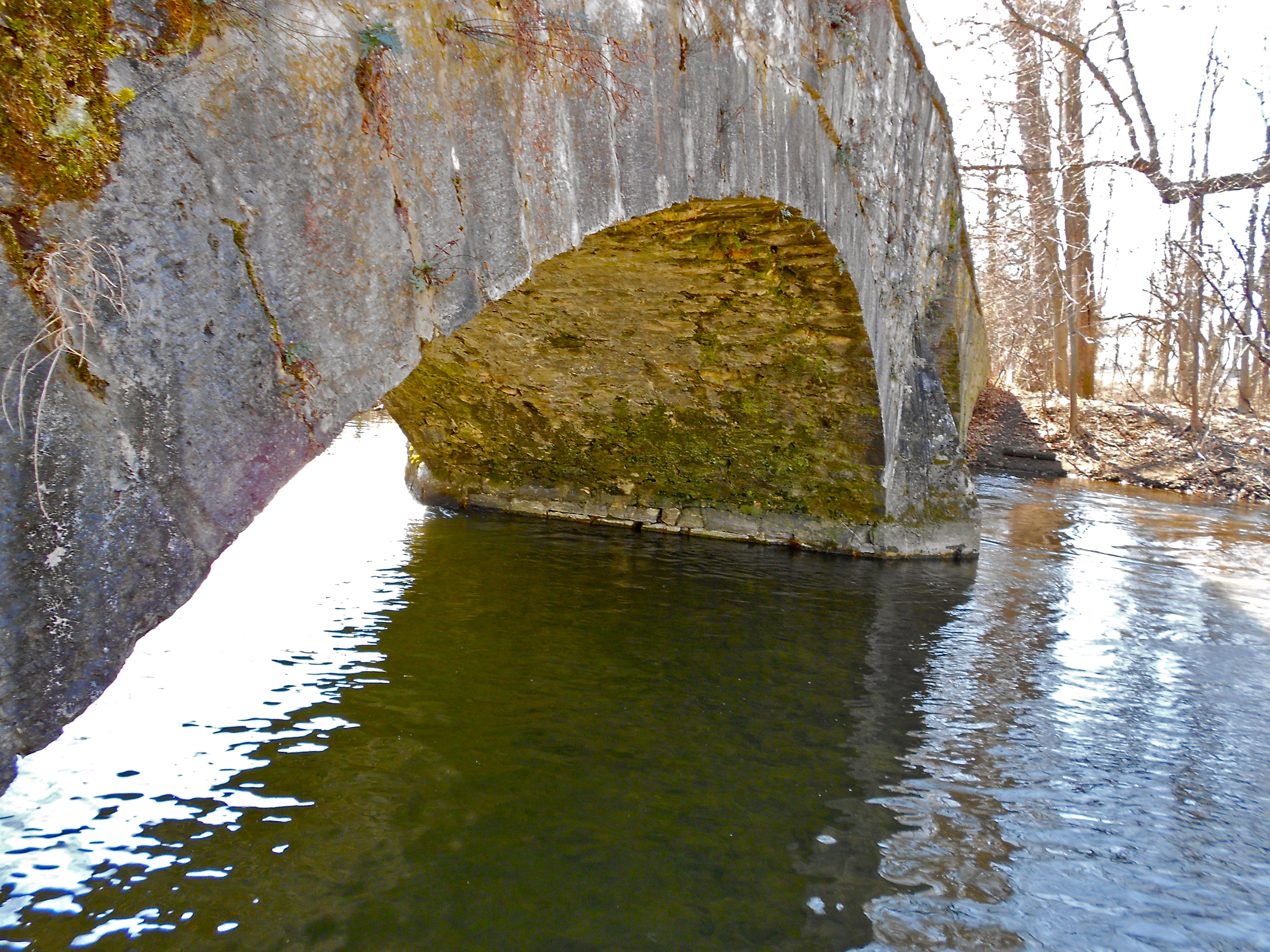
Detail of stonework on the east arch
