= Wayne Heights, Pennsylvania =

Unincorporated community in Pennsylvania, US

- Census-designated place
- Location within Pennsylvania Location within the United States
- Coordinates: 39°44′57″N 77°32′27″W
- Country: United States
- State: Pennsylvania
- County: Franklin
- Township: Washington

Area
  - Total: 2.1 sq mi (5.5 km^{2})
  - Land: 2.1 sq mi (5.5 km^{2})
  - Water: 0 sq mi (0.0 km^{2})
- Elevation: 712 ft (217 m)

Population (2020)
  - Total: 2,606
  - Density: 1,193/sq mi (460.7/km^{2})
- Time zone: UTC-5 (Eastern (EST))
  - Summer (DST): UTC-4 (EDT)
- ZIP code: 17268
- FIPS code: 42-81808
- GNIS feature ID: 2390461

Wayne Heights is a census-designated place (CDP) in Franklin County, Pennsylvania, United States. The population was 2,606 at the 2020 census.

== Geography ==
Wayne Heights is located in southeastern Franklin County east of the center of Washington Township. It is bordered to the west by the borough of Waynesboro and to the east by the community of Rouzerville.

Pennsylvania Route 16 is Main Street through Wayne Heights, leading west through Waynesboro 10 miles (16 km) to Greencastle, and east 5 miles (8 km) to Blue Ridge Summit.

According to the United States Census Bureau, the CDP has a total area of 2.1 square miles (5.5 km^{2}), all land.

== Demographics ==
As of the census of 2000, there were 1,805 people, 758 households, and 567 families residing in the CDP. The population density was 847.5 inhabitants per square mile (327.2/km^{2}). There were 801 housing units at an average density of 376.1 per square mile (145.2/km^{2}). The racial makeup of the CDP was 96.18% White, 1.11% African American, 0.06% Native American, 1.99% Asian, 0.11% from other races, and 0.55% from two or more races. Hispanic or Latino of any race were 0.89% of the population.

There were 758 households, out of which 25.5% had children under the age of 18 living with them, 68.6% were married couples living together, 5.5% had a female householder with no husband present, and 25.1% were non-families. 21.6% of all households were made up of individuals, and 12.3% had someone living alone who was 65 years of age or older. The average household size was 2.36 and the average family size was 2.74.

In the CDP, the population was spread out, with 18.9% under the age of 18, 5.0% from 18 to 24, 26.1% from 25 to 44, 26.0% from 45 to 64, and 24.0% who were 65 years of age or older. The median age was 45 years. For every 100 females, there were 89.6 males. For every 100 females age 18 and over, there were 89.1 males.

The median income for a household in the CDP was $43,641, and the median income for a family was $53,036. Males had a median income of $37,153 versus $29,931 for females. The per capita income for the CDP was $21,086. None of the families and 1.5% of the population were living below the poverty line, including no under eighteens and 2.0% of those over 64.
