= 1880 United States presidential election in Pennsylvania =

- November 2, 1880
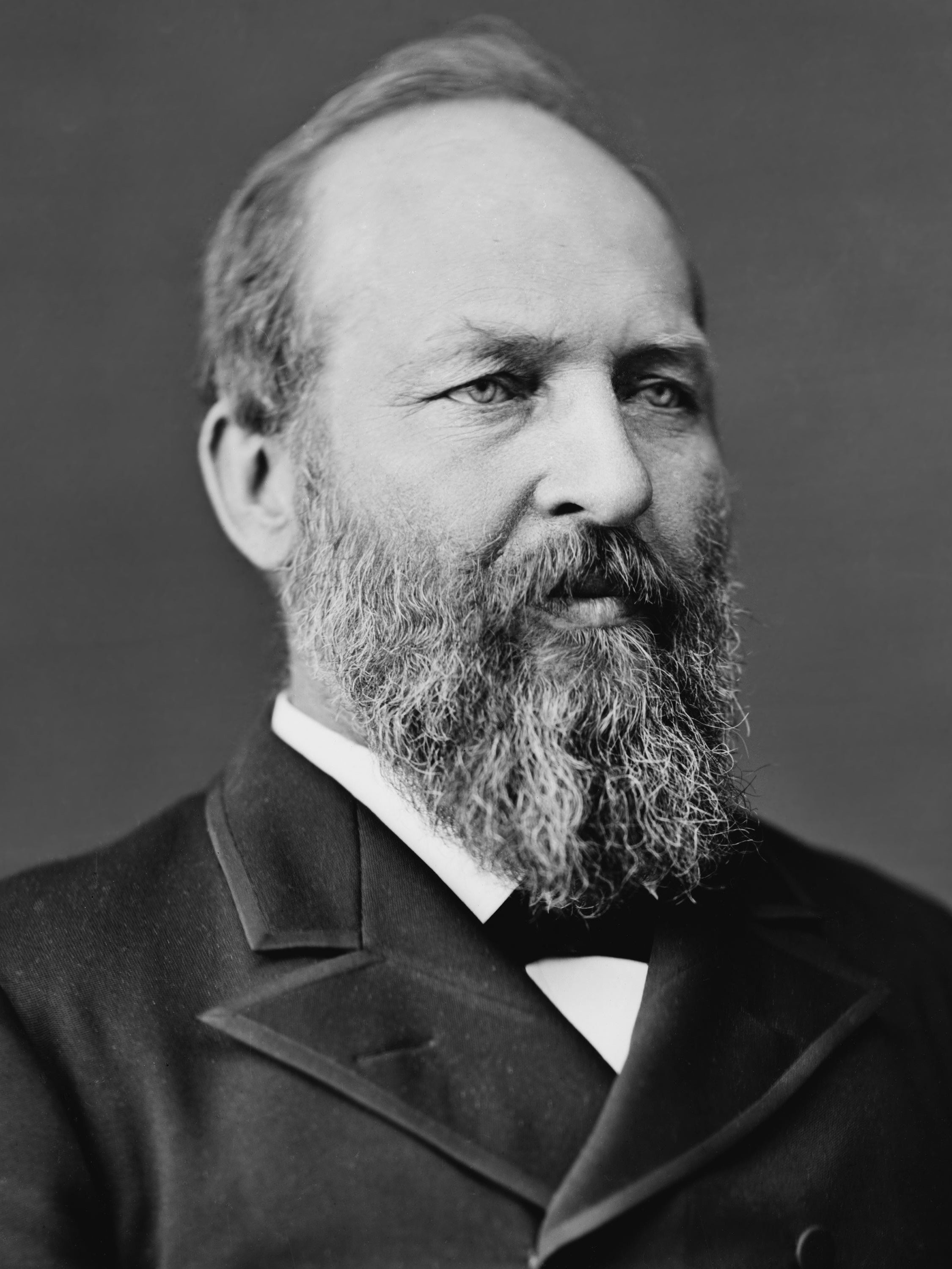

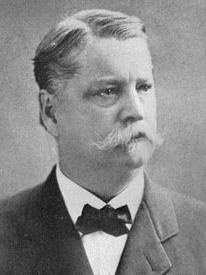
| Nominee | James A. Garfield | Winfield Scott Hancock |
| Party | Republican | Democratic |
| Home state | Ohio | Pennsylvania |
| Running mate | Chester A. Arthur | William Hayden English |
| Electoral vote | 29 | 0 |
| Popular vote | 444,704 | 407,428 |
| Percentage | 50.84% | 46.57% |
County results
Garfield
30–40%
40–50%
50–60%
60–70%
Hancock
40–50%
50–60%
60–70%
70–80%
President before election
Rutherford B. Hayes
Republican
Elected President
James A. Garfield
Republican

A presidential election was held in Pennsylvania on November 2, 1880, as part of the 1880 United States presidential election. Voters chose 29 representatives, or electors to the Electoral College, who voted for president and vice president.

Pennsylvania voted for the Republican nominee, James A. Garfield, over the Democratic nominee, Winfield Scott Hancock. Garfield won Pennsylvania by a margin of 4.27%. Had Hancock won the state, the election would have been decided by one electoral vote, like the 1876 election.

== Results ==
1880 United States presidential election in Pennsylvania
| Party | Candidate | Votes | Percentage | Electoral votes |
|---|---|---|---|---|
| Republican | James A. Garfield | 444,704 | 50.84% | 29 |
| Democratic | Winfield Scott Hancock | 407,428 | 46.57% | 0 |
| Greenback | James B. Weaver | 20,668 | 2.36% | 0 |
| Prohibition | Neal S. Dow | 1,939 | 0.22% | 0 |
| Anti-Masonic | John W. Phelps | 44 | 0.01% | 0 |
| Totals | | 874,783 | 100.0% | 29 |

=== Results by county ===
| County | James A. Garfield Republican | | Winfield Scott Hancock Democratic | | James B. Weaver Greenback | | Various candidates Other parties | | Margin | | Total votes cast |
| County | # | % | # | % | # | % | # | % | # | % | Total votes cast |
|---|---|---|---|---|---|---|---|---|---|---|---|
| Adams | 3,137 | 45.08% | 3,752 | 53.92% | 69 | 0.99% | 0 | 0.00% | -615 | -8.84% | 6,958 |
| Allegheny | 35,539 | 59.85% | 22,096 | 37.21% | 1,636 | 2.76% | 111 | 0.19% | 13,443 | 22.64% | 59,382 |
| Armstrong | 4,721 | 51.90% | 3,991 | 43.88% | 375 | 4.12% | 9 | 0.10% | 730 | 8.03% | 9,096 |
| Beaver | 4,700 | 56.40% | 3,498 | 41.97% | 129 | 1.55% | 7 | 0.08% | 1,202 | 14.42% | 8,334 |
| Bedford | 3,638 | 48.96% | 3,723 | 50.10% | 53 | 0.71% | 17 | 0.23% | -85 | -1.14% | 7,431 |
| Berks | 9,225 | 34.99% | 16,959 | 64.32% | 179 | 0.68% | 2 | 0.01% | -7,734 | -29.33% | 26,365 |
| Blair | 5,808 | 53.95% | 4,728 | 43.92% | 195 | 1.81% | 35 | 0.33% | 1,080 | 10.03% | 10,766 |
| Bradford | 8,152 | 59.65% | 4,950 | 36.22% | 496 | 3.63% | 68 | 0.50% | 3,202 | 23.43% | 13,666 |
| Bucks | 8,385 | 49.19% | 8,627 | 50.61% | 23 | 0.13% | 12 | 0.07% | -242 | -1.42% | 17,047 |
| Butler | 5,269 | 50.96% | 4,678 | 45.24% | 346 | 3.35% | 47 | 0.45% | 591 | 5.72% | 10,340 |
| Cambria | 3,962 | 45.61% | 4,555 | 52.44% | 150 | 1.73% | 19 | 0.22% | -593 | -6.83% | 8,686 |
| Cameron | 647 | 51.47% | 582 | 46.30% | 27 | 2.15% | 1 | 0.08% | 65 | 5.17% | 1,257 |
| Carbon | 2,857 | 44.47% | 3,464 | 53.91% | 88 | 1.37% | 16 | 0.25% | -607 | -9.45% | 6,425 |
| Centre | 3,602 | 43.30% | 4,598 | 55.28% | 99 | 1.19% | 19 | 0.23% | -996 | -11.97% | 8,318 |
| Chester | 11,298 | 59.25% | 7,524 | 39.46% | 90 | 0.47% | 156 | 0.82% | 3,774 | 19.79% | 19,068 |
| Clarion | 2,933 | 38.14% | 4,433 | 57.65% | 322 | 4.19% | 2 | 0.03% | -1,500 | -19.51% | 7,690 |
| Clearfield | 3,105 | 37.21% | 4,928 | 59.05% | 296 | 3.55% | 16 | 0.19% | -1,823 | -21.85% | 8,345 |
| Clinton | 2,284 | 41.82% | 3,117 | 57.08% | 36 | 0.66% | 24 | 0.44% | -833 | -15.25% | 5,461 |
| Columbia | 2,236 | 31.70% | 4,598 | 65.18% | 192 | 2.72% | 28 | 0.40% | -2,362 | -33.48% | 7,054 |
| Crawford | 7,192 | 48.47% | 5,847 | 39.41% | 1,759 | 11.86% | 39 | 0.26% | 1,345 | 9.07% | 14,837 |
| Cumberland | 4,431 | 44.17% | 5,462 | 54.45% | 118 | 1.18% | 20 | 0.20% | -1,031 | -10.28% | 10,031 |
| Dauphin | 8,573 | 55.21% | 6,619 | 42.62% | 315 | 2.03% | 22 | 0.14% | 1,954 | 12.58% | 15,529 |
| Delaware | 7,008 | 60.84% | 4,473 | 38.83% | 21 | 0.18% | 17 | 0.15% | 2,535 | 22.01% | 11,519 |
| Elk | 720 | 30.74% | 1,534 | 65.50% | 88 | 3.76% | 0 | 0.00% | -814 | -34.76% | 2,342 |
| Erie | 8,752 | 55.12% | 6,471 | 40.76% | 641 | 4.04% | 13 | 0.08% | 2,281 | 14.37% | 15,877 |
| Fayette | 4,920 | 41.69% | 6,250 | 52.96% | 609 | 5.16% | 22 | 0.19% | -1,330 | -11.27% | 11,801 |
| Forest | 370 | 37.87% | 325 | 33.27% | 281 | 28.76% | 1 | 0.10% | 45 | 4.61% | 977 |
| Franklin | 5,379 | 51.88% | 4,964 | 47.88% | 4 | 0.04% | 21 | 0.20% | 415 | 4.00% | 10,368 |
| Fulton | 853 | 40.48% | 1,252 | 59.42% | 0 | 0.00% | 2 | 0.09% | -399 | -18.94% | 2,107 |
| Greene | 2,210 | 33.85% | 4,271 | 65.42% | 32 | 0.49% | 16 | 0.25% | -2,061 | -31.57% | 6,529 |
| Huntingdon | 3,787 | 52.36% | 3,039 | 42.02% | 393 | 5.43% | 14 | 0.19% | 748 | 10.34% | 7,233 |
| Indiana | 4,617 | 56.07% | 2,119 | 25.73% | 1,488 | 18.07% | 10 | 0.12% | 2,498 | 30.34% | 8,234 |
| Jefferson | 2,750 | 49.74% | 2,635 | 47.66% | 137 | 2.48% | 7 | 0.13% | 115 | 2.08% | 5,529 |
| Juniata | 1,625 | 43.86% | 1,999 | 53.95% | 62 | 1.67% | 19 | 0.51% | -374 | -10.09% | 3,705 |
| Lackawanna | 7,357 | 49.80% | 7,178 | 48.59% | 151 | 1.02% | 88 | 0.60% | 179 | 1.21% | 14,774 |
| Lancaster | 19,489 | 64.11% | 10,789 | 35.49% | 39 | 0.13% | 81 | 0.27% | 8,700 | 28.62% | 30,398 |
| Lawrence | 4,360 | 65.39% | 2,047 | 30.70% | 168 | 2.52% | 93 | 1.39% | 2,313 | 34.69% | 6,668 |
| Lebanon | 5,042 | 60.95% | 3,218 | 38.90% | 7 | 0.08% | 6 | 0.07% | 1,824 | 22.05% | 8,273 |
| Lehigh | 6,144 | 42.49% | 8,292 | 57.35% | 17 | 0.12% | 6 | 0.04% | -2,148 | -14.86% | 14,459 |
| Luzerne | 11,028 | 45.94% | 12,575 | 52.38% | 372 | 1.55% | 31 | 0.13% | -1,547 | -6.44% | 24,006 |
| Lycoming | 4,955 | 41.41% | 6,416 | 53.61% | 560 | 4.68% | 36 | 0.30% | -1,461 | -12.21% | 11,967 |
| McKean | 3,693 | 51.46% | 3,169 | 44.15% | 299 | 4.17% | 16 | 0.22% | 524 | 7.30% | 7,177 |
| Mercer | 6,079 | 51.33% | 5,029 | 42.46% | 490 | 4.14% | 245 | 2.07% | 1,050 | 8.87% | 11,843 |
| Mifflin | 2,075 | 51.03% | 1,955 | 48.08% | 25 | 0.61% | 11 | 0.27% | 120 | 2.95% | 4,066 |
| Monroe | 962 | 22.30% | 3,334 | 77.28% | 17 | 0.39% | 1 | 0.02% | -2,372 | -54.98% | 4,314 |
| Montgomery | 11,026 | 49.75% | 11,025 | 49.75% | 75 | 0.34% | 37 | 0.17% | 1 | 0.00% | 22,163 |
| Montour | 1,265 | 39.36% | 1,862 | 57.93% | 80 | 2.49% | 7 | 0.22% | -597 | -18.57% | 3,214 |
| Northampton | 5,961 | 37.90% | 9,653 | 61.37% | 93 | 0.59% | 21 | 0.13% | -3,692 | -23.47% | 15,728 |
| Northumberland | 4,847 | 43.62% | 5,931 | 53.38% | 319 | 2.87% | 14 | 0.13% | -1,084 | -9.76% | 11,111 |
| Perry | 3,032 | 50.94% | 2,894 | 48.62% | 0 | 0.00% | 26 | 0.44% | 138 | 2.32% | 5,952 |
| Philadelphia | 97,220 | 55.92% | 76,330 | 43.91% | 237 | 0.14% | 57 | 0.03% | 20,890 | 12.02% | 173,844 |
| Pike | 537 | 28.55% | 1,332 | 70.81% | 10 | 0.53% | 2 | 0.11% | -795 | -42.26% | 1,881 |
| Potter | 1,773 | 56.00% | 1,134 | 35.82% | 255 | 8.05% | 4 | 0.13% | 639 | 20.18% | 3,166 |
| Schuylkill | 9,337 | 40.01% | 11,511 | 49.32% | 2,488 | 10.66% | 3 | 0.01% | -2,174 | -9.31% | 23,339 |
| Snyder | 2,120 | 56.75% | 1,579 | 42.26% | 13 | 0.35% | 24 | 0.64% | 541 | 14.48% | 3,736 |
| Somerset | 4,150 | 61.72% | 2,500 | 37.18% | 55 | 0.82% | 19 | 0.28% | 1,650 | 24.54% | 6,724 |
| Sullivan | 625 | 36.96% | 994 | 58.78% | 72 | 4.26% | 0 | 0.00% | -369 | -21.82% | 1,691 |
| Susquehanna | 5,031 | 55.15% | 3,802 | 41.67% | 256 | 2.81% | 34 | 0.37% | 1,229 | 13.47% | 9,123 |
| Tioga | 6,018 | 60.17% | 2,815 | 28.14% | 1,151 | 11.51% | 18 | 0.18% | 3,203 | 32.02% | 10,002 |
| Union | 2,254 | 59.74% | 1,502 | 39.81% | 11 | 0.29% | 6 | 0.16% | 752 | 19.93% | 3,773 |
| Venango | 4,089 | 48.32% | 3,573 | 42.22% | 685 | 8.10% | 115 | 1.36% | 516 | 6.10% | 8,462 |
| Warren | 3,207 | 53.07% | 2,118 | 35.05% | 684 | 11.32% | 34 | 0.56% | 1,089 | 18.02% | 6,043 |
| Washington | 6,451 | 51.04% | 5,850 | 46.29% | 330 | 2.61% | 8 | 0.06% | 601 | 4.76% | 12,639 |
| Wayne | 3,122 | 46.88% | 3,421 | 51.37% | 13 | 0.20% | 103 | 1.55% | -299 | -4.49% | 6,659 |
| Westmoreland | 7,113 | 44.47% | 7,975 | 49.86% | 899 | 5.62% | 9 | 0.06% | -862 | -5.39% | 15,996 |
| Wyoming | 1,787 | 46.82% | 1,983 | 51.95% | 38 | 1.00% | 9 | 0.24% | -196 | -5.13% | 3,817 |
| York | 7,870 | 40.43% | 11,581 | 59.49% | 9 | 0.05% | 8 | 0.04% | -3,711 | -19.06% | 19,468 |
| Totals | 444,704 | 50.84% | 407,428 | 46.57% | 20,667 | 2.36% | 1,984 | 0.23% | 37,276 | 4.26% | 874,783 |

== See also ==
- United States presidential elections in Pennsylvania
