= Pen Mar, Pennsylvania =

Unincorporated community in Pennsylvania, US

- Census-designated place
- Location within Pennsylvania Location within the United States
- Coordinates: 39°43′27″N 77°30′54″W
- Country: United States
- State: Pennsylvania
- County: Franklin
- Township: Washington

Area
  - Total: 0.75 sq mi (1.93 km^{2})
  - Land: 0.74 sq mi (1.91 km^{2})
  - Water: 0.0077 sq mi (0.02 km^{2})
- Elevation: 899 ft (274 m)

Population (2020)
  - Total: 947
  - Density: 1,282.1/sq mi (495.04/km^{2})
- Time zone: UTC-5 (Eastern (EST))
  - Summer (DST): UTC-4 (EDT)
- ZIP code: 17268
- FIPS code: 42-58776
- GNIS feature ID: 2634268

Pen Mar is an unincorporated community and census-designated place (CDP) that is located in Washington Township of Franklin County, Pennsylvania, United States. It is one of the border towns in the United States with a portmanteau name. It is situated on the Mason–Dixon line, bordered to the south by the community of Pen Mar in Maryland.

== History ==
The community's name is a portmanteau of "Pennsylvania" and "Maryland".

== Geography ==
Pen Mar is located in southeastern Franklin County, on the western slope of South Mountain. Pennsylvania Route 550 is the main road through the community, leading northwest down the mountain 2 miles (3 km) to Rouzerville. Waynesboro is 4.5 miles (7.2 km) northwest of Pen Mar, and the site of the former Fort Ritchie in Maryland is 1 mile (1.6 km) to the southeast.

== Demographics ==
As of the 2020 census, the population of Pen Mar was 947.

Historical population
| Census | Pop. | Note | %± |
|---|---|---|---|
| 2010 | 929 | | — |
| 2020 | 947 | | 1.9% |
U.S. Decennial Census
