= Rouzerville, Pennsylvania =

Unincorporated community in Pennsylvania, US

- Census-designated place
- Location within Pennsylvania Location within the United States
- Coordinates: 39°44′03″N 77°31′41″W
- Country: United States
- State: Pennsylvania
- County: Franklin
- Township: Washington

Area
  - Total: 0.66 sq mi (1.7 km^{2})
  - Land: 0.66 sq mi (1.7 km^{2})
  - Water: 0 sq mi (0.0 km^{2})
- Elevation: 725 ft (221 m)

Population (2020)
  - Total: 903
  - Density: 1,403/sq mi (541.7/km^{2})
- Time zone: UTC-5 (Eastern (EST))
  - Summer (DST): UTC-4 (EDT)
- ZIP code: 17250
- FIPS code: 42-66448
- GNIS feature ID: 2389787

Rouzerville is an unincorporated community and census-designated place (CDP) in Franklin County, Pennsylvania, United States. The population was 903 at the 2020 census.

== Geography ==
Rouzerville is located in southeastern Franklin County at the foot of South Mountain, which rises to the east. The community is bordered to the southwest by Pen Mar and to the west by Wayne Heights. Pennsylvania Route 16 passes through the northern part of Rouzerville, leading east 4 miles (6 km) to Blue Ridge Summit and west 2.5 miles (4.0 km) to Waynesboro.

According to the United States Census Bureau, the CDP has a total area of 0.66 square miles (1.7 km^{2}), all land.

== Demographics ==
As of the census of 2000, there were 862 people, 367 households, and 258 families residing in the CDP. The population density was 1,321.5 inhabitants per square mile (510.2/km^{2}). There were 388 housing units at an average density of 594.8 per square mile (229.7/km^{2}). The racial makeup of the CDP was 97.91% White, 0.81% African American, 0.23% Native American, 0.12% from other races, and 0.93% from two or more races. Hispanic or Latino of any race were 0.12% of the population.

There were 367 households, out of which 30.5% had children under the age of 18 living with them, 56.9% were married couples living together, 8.4% had a female householder with no husband present, and 29.7% were non-families. 26.7% of all households were made up of individuals, and 12.8% had someone living alone who was 65 years of age or older. The average household size was 2.35 and the average family size was 2.81.

In the CDP, the population was spread out, with 21.2% under the age of 18, 7.1% from 18 to 24, 31.2% from 25 to 44, 24.5% from 45 to 64, and 16.0% who were 65 years of age or older. The median age was 39 years. For every 100 females, there were 98.2 males. For every 100 females age 18 and over, there were 95.1 males.

The median income for a household in the CDP was $27,031, and the median income for a family was $40,741. Males had a median income of $31,308 versus $20,647 for females. The per capita income for the CDP was $17,467. About 9.6% of families and 16.2% of the population were below the poverty line, including 16.6% of those under age 18 and 29.1% of those age 65 or over.
