= Monterey Historic District (Blue Ridge Summit, Pennsylvania) =

Historic district in Pennsylvania, United States

- U.S. National Register of Historic Places
- U.S. Historic district
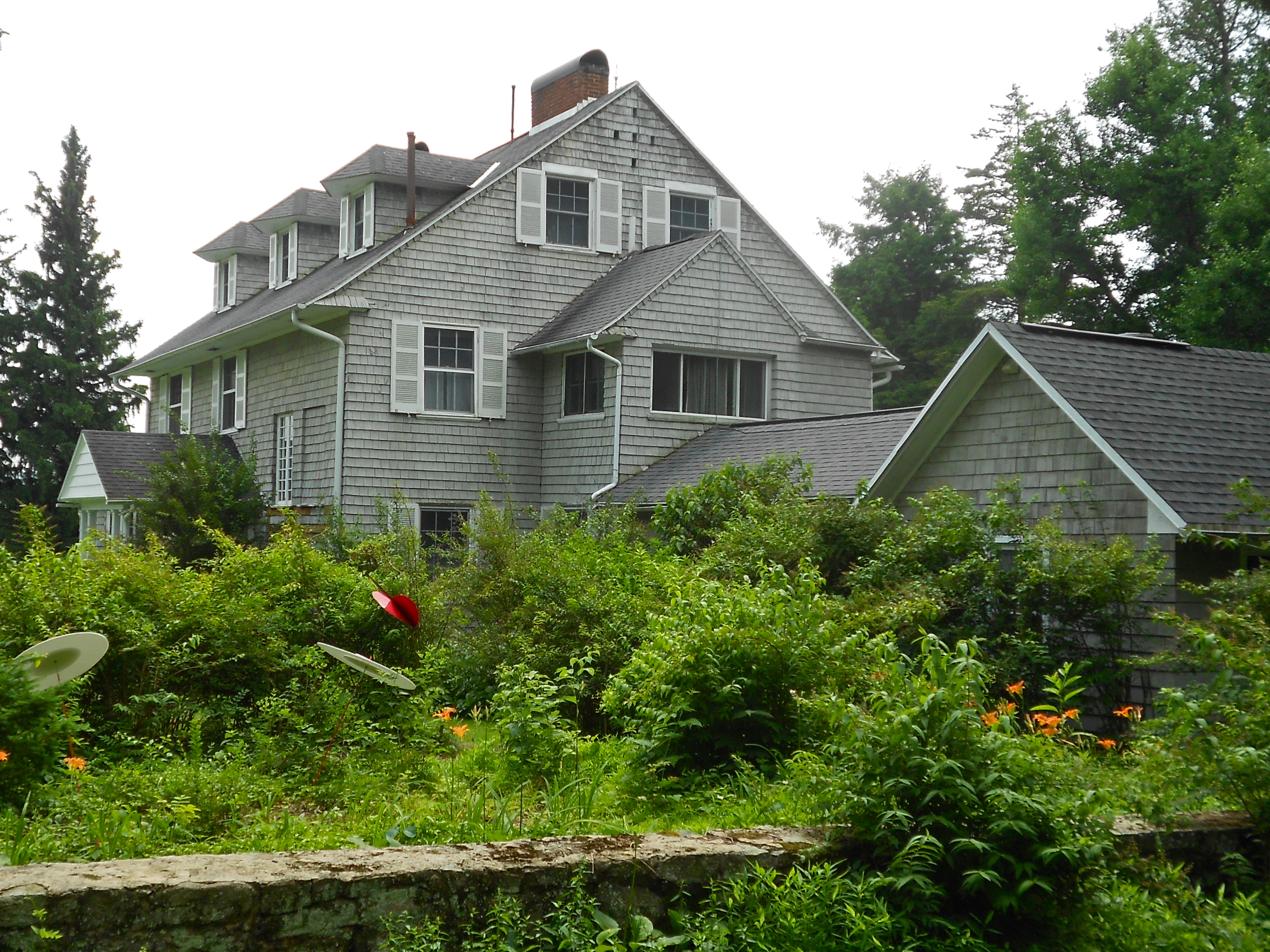

- Location within Pennsylvania Location within the United States
- Location: Off Pennsylvania Route 16 near Blue Ridge Summit, Washington Township, Pennsylvania
- Coordinates: 39°44′10″N 77°28′09″W
- Area: 250 acres (100 ha)
- Built: 1885
- Architectural style: Colonial Revival, Late Victorian, Georgian Revival
- NRHP reference No.: 76001639
- Added to NRHP: April 22, 1976

The Monterey Historic District is a national historic district that is located in Washington Township, Franklin County, Pennsylvania.

It was listed on the National Register of Historic Places in 1976.

== History and architectural features ==
This district includes sixty contributing buildings associated with a late-nineteenth century summer resort community, developed primarily after 1885. The residential buildings include several high-styled Late Victorian, Georgian Revival, and Colonial Revival-style, cottage dwellings. Notable buildings include "Alfheim," "Red House," "Bramble Bush," "Pink Shutters," "Charmian Manor," Pittman House, Greystone Inn (c. 1850), Valore House (1895), Hawley Church, Dunbrack Library (c. 1894), Dunbrack Inn, and Dunbrack Stables (c. 1880).
