= Washington Township, Franklin County, Pennsylvania =

Township in Pennsylvania, US

Coordinates: 39°46′00″N 77°37′59″W

- Township
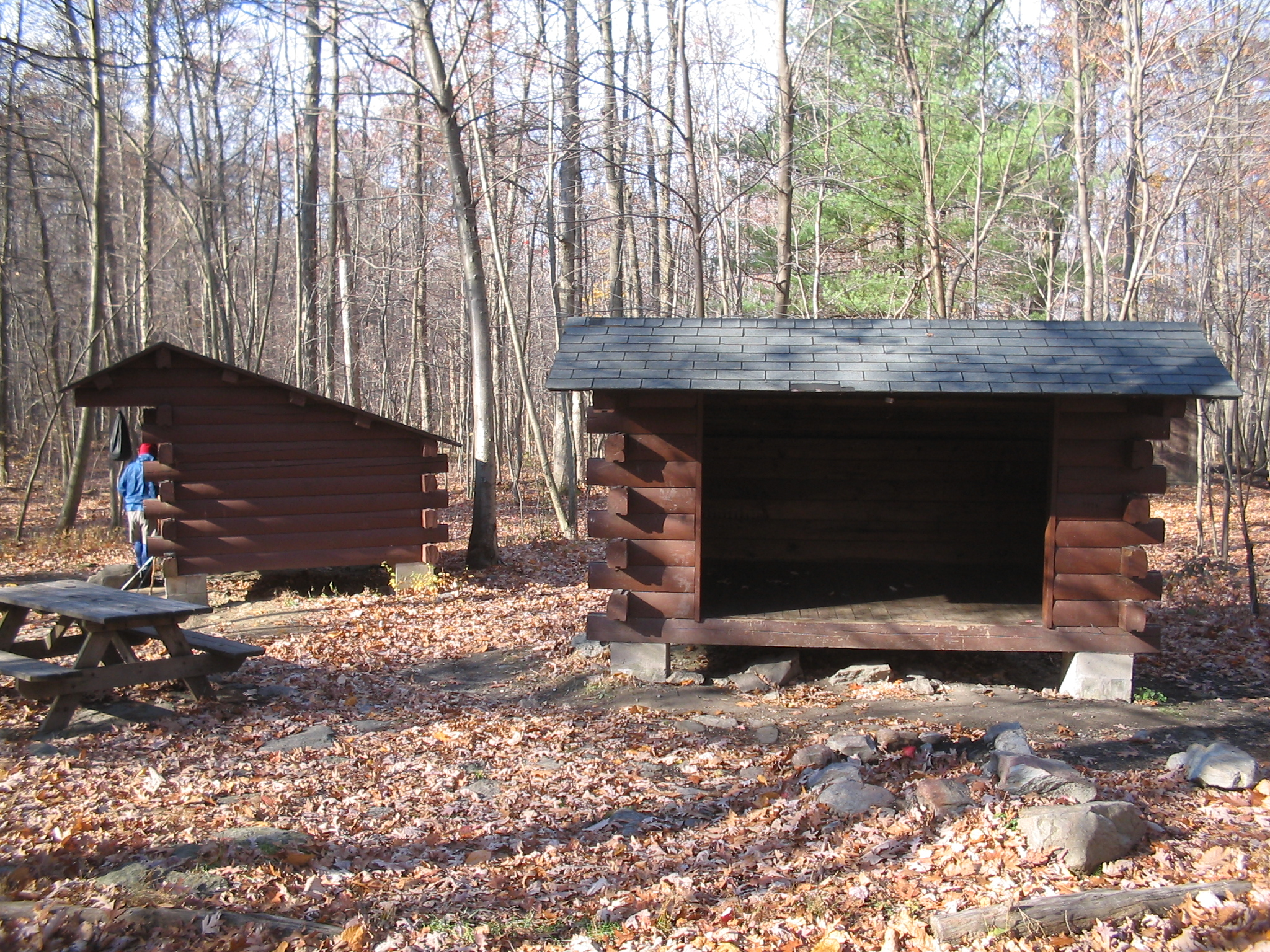
- The Deer Lick Shelters on the Appalachian Trail in Washington Township

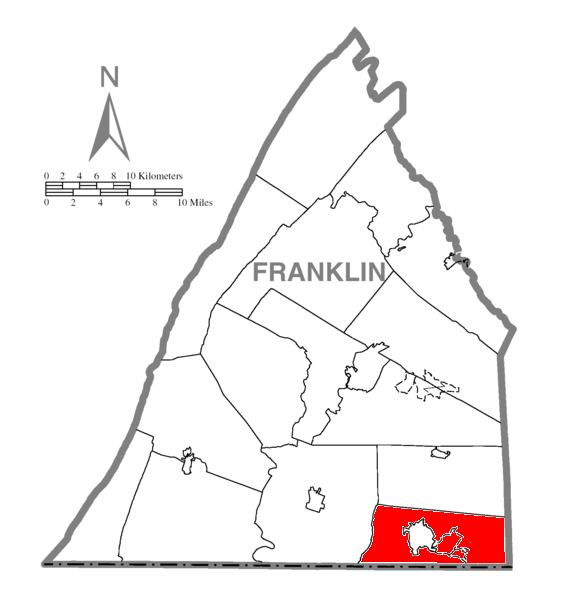
- Map of Franklin County, Pennsylvania highlighting Washington Township

- Map of Franklin County, Pennsylvania
- Country: United States
- State: Pennsylvania
- County: Franklin
- Settled: 1735
- Incorporated: 1779

Area
  - Total: 39.06 sq mi (101.16 km^{2})
  - Land: 39.05 sq mi (101.14 km^{2})
  - Water: 0.0077 sq mi (0.02 km^{2})

Population (2020)
  - Total: 14,897
  - Estimate (2016): 14,586
  - Density: 373.5/sq mi (144.22/km^{2})
- Time zone: UTC-5 (Eastern (EST))
  - Summer (DST): UTC-4 (EDT)
- Area code: 717
- FIPS code: 42-055-81240
- Website: www.washtwp-franklin.org

Washington Township is a township in Franklin County, Pennsylvania, United States. The population was 14,897 at the 2020 census, up from 14,009 at the 2010 census.

== History ==
Washington Township was organized by an order of the Court of Quarter Sessions § United States of Cumberland County, Pennsylvania about April term in 1779. The township was formed out of Antrim Township, Pennsylvania. The township was named in honor of General George Washington.

Handycraft Farmstead, Harbaugh's Reformed Church, Jeremiah Burns Farm, Red Run Lodge, Monterey Historic District, Springdale Mills, Waynesboro Armory, and the Welty's Mill Bridge are listed on the National Register of Historic Places.

== Geography ==
The township occupies the southeastern corner of Franklin County, bounded to the east by Adams County and to the south by Washington and Frederick counties in the state of Maryland. The township entirely surrounds the borough of Waynesboro, a separate municipality.

The western two-thirds of the township are in the Great Appalachian Valley, while the eastern third is on the ridges and valleys of South Mountain. The Appalachian Trail traverses South Mountain through the township.

Unincorporated communities in the township include Wayne Heights, Rouzerville, Pen Mar, Blue Ridge Summit, and Monterey.

According to the United States Census Bureau, the township has a total area of 39.1 square miles (101.2 km^{2}), of which 0.01 square miles (0.02 km^{2}), or 0.02%, is water. The township is drained by the East and West Branches of Antietam Creek, a south-flowing tributary of the Potomac River. The extreme east end of the township lies east of the crest of South Mountain and is part of the Monocacy River watershed, another tributary of the Potomac.

=== Communities ===
- Beartown
- Blue Ridge Summit
- Buena Vista Springs
- Charmian
- Cress
- Eastland Hills
- Glen Forney
- Midvale
- Monterey
- Pen Mar
- Pennersville
- Polktown
- Roadside
- Rouzerville
- Wayne Heights
- Zullinger

=== Neighboring Townships ===
- Antrim Township (west)
- Hamiltonban Township (Adams County), (east)
- Liberty Township (Adams County), (east)
- Quincy Township

=== Climate ===
Climate data for Washington Township, Pennsylvania (Hagerstown Regional Airport), 1981−2010 normals, extremes 1899−present
Month	Jan	Feb	Mar	Apr	May	Jun	Jul	Aug	Sep	Oct	Nov	Dec	Year
Record high °F (°C)	78 (26)	82 (28)	88 (31)	94 (34)	96 (36)	102 (39)	107 (42)	104 (40)	101 (38)	95 (35)	83 (28)	75 (24)	107 (42)
Mean daily maximum °F (°C)	38.3 (3.5)	41.4 (5.2)	50.7 (10.4)	62.9 (17.2)	72.2 (22.3)	81.3 (27.4)	85.2 (29.6)	83.0 (28.3)	75.3 (24.1)	65.1 (18.4)	53.5 (11.9)	41.3 (5.2)	62.6 (17.0)
Mean daily minimum °F (°C)	23.3 (−4.8)	25.8 (−3.4)	32.3 (0.2)	42.6 (5.9)	51.8 (11.0)	61.4 (16.3)	65.5 (18.6)	63.6 (17.6)	56.2 (13.4)	44.4 (6.9)	36.3 (2.4)	26.8 (−2.9)	44.3 (6.8)
Record low °F (°C)	−27 (−33)	−20 (−29)	−7 (−22)	9 (−13)	23 (−5)	30 (−1)	42 (6)	39 (4)	25 (−4)	18 (−8)	−4 (−20)	−13 (−25)	−27 (−33)
Average precipitation inches (mm)	2.68 (68)	2.55 (65)	3.38 (86)	3.56 (90)	4.03 (102)	3.88 (99)	3.41 (87)	3.14 (80)	3.67 (93)	2.88 (73)	3.22 (82)	2.89 (73)	39.29 (998)
Source: NOAA

== Education ==
Washington Township lies within Waynesboro Area School District.

=== Schools serving Washington Township ===
- Fairview Avenue Elementary School
- Hooverville Elementary School
- Mowrey Elementary School
- Summitville Elementary School
- Waynesboro Area Middle School
- Waynesboro Area Senior High School

== Infrastructure ==
=== Major highways ===
- PA 16
- PA 316
- MD 550
- PA 997

=== Utilities ===
- Cable TV - Comcast
- Electric - West Penn Power
- Natural Gas - UGI Corporation
- Telephone - Century Link
- Trash and Recycling Services - Waste Management, IESI, Hoppers, Parks Garbage Service, or Worthy's Refuse Inc.
- Water and Sewer Authorities - Washington Township Municipal Authority

=== Healthcare ===
- WellSpan Waynesboro Hospital (located in Waynesboro, PA)

== Parks and Recreation ==
Washington Township owns and maintains six parks and the Rouzerville Community Center located within the Township boundaries.

- Antietam Meadow Park
- Happel's Meadow Wetland
- Monterey Park
- Pat O'Connor Nature Park
- Pine Hill Recreation Area
- Red Run Park

== Demographics ==
Historical population
Census	Pop.	Note	%±
2000	11,559		—
2010	14,009		21.2%
2020	14,897		6.3%
2016 (est.)	14,586		4.1%
U.S. Decennial Census

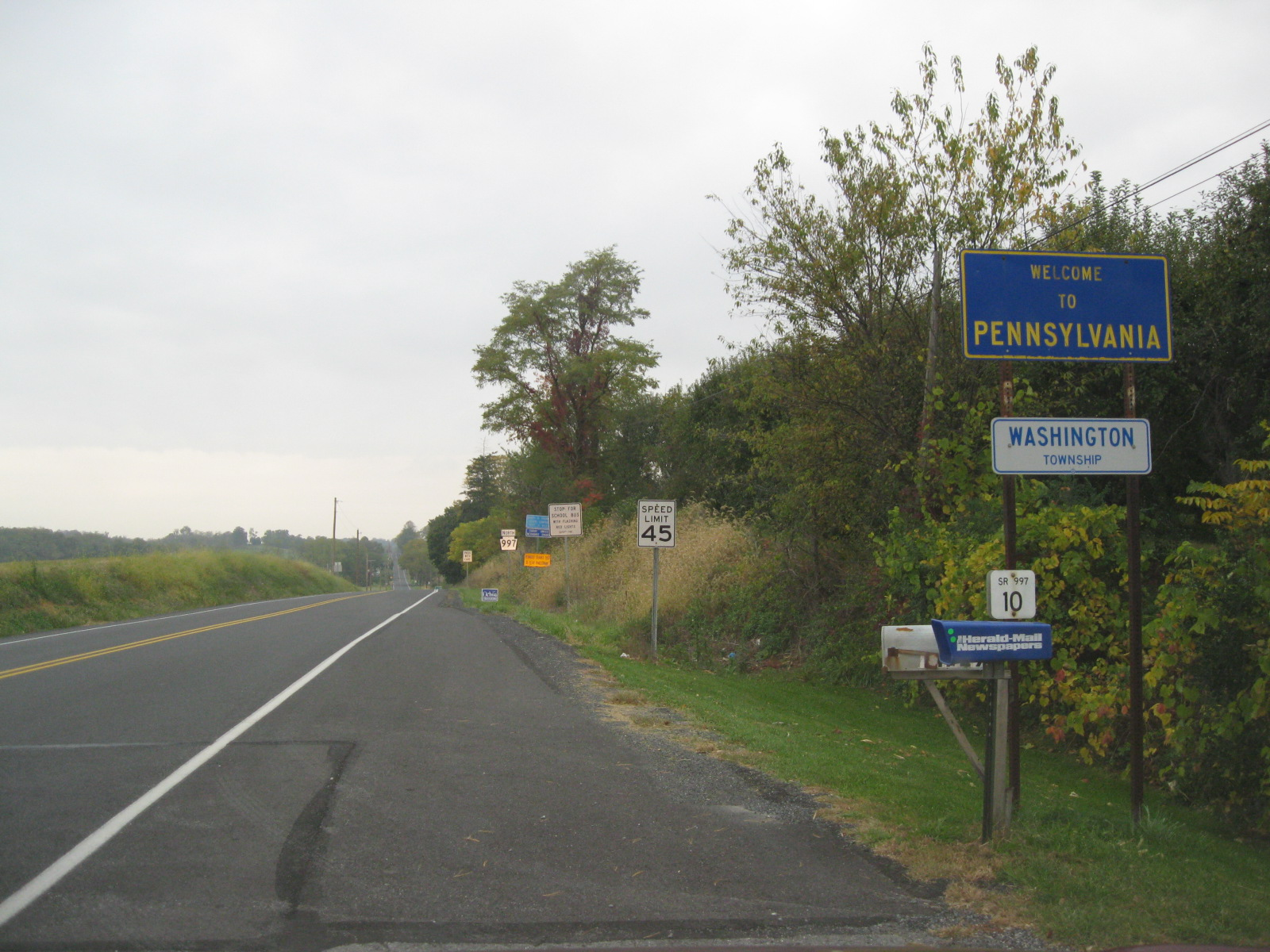
Entering Washington Township along Pennsylvania Route 997

As of the census of 2000, there were 11,559 people, 4,577 households, and 3,469 families residing in the township. The population density was 297.2 inhabitants per square mile (114.7/km^{2}). There were 4,840 housing units at an average density of 124.4 per square mile (48.0/km^{2}). The racial makeup of the township was 97.08% White, 1.01% African American, 0.15% Native American, 0.90% Asian, 0.03% Pacific Islander, 0.34% from other races, and 0.49% from two or more races. Hispanic or Latino of any race were 0.80% of the population.

There were 4,577 households, out of which 30.5% had children under the age of 18 living with them, 65.6% were married couples living together, 7.1% had a female householder with no husband present, and 24.2% were non-families. 20.5% of all households were made up of individuals, and 9.2% had someone living alone who was 65 years of age or older. The average household size was 2.52 and the average family size was 2.90.

In the township the population was spread out, with 23.2% under the age of 18, 7.0% from 18 to 24, 28.0% from 25 to 44, 26.0% from 45 to 64, and 15.8% who were 65 years of age or older. The median age was 40 years. For every 100 females, there were 96.4 males. For every 100 females age 18 and over, there were 95.1 males.

The median income for a household in the township was $45,165, and the median income for a family was $51,791. Males had a median income of $36,255 versus $25,192 for females. The per capita income for the township was $20,673. About 2.6% of families and 3.9% of the population were below the poverty line, including 3.2% of those under age 18 and 6.2% of those age 65 or over.
