= Red Run Lodge =

- U.S. National Register of Historic Places
- before 2008

- Location within Pennsylvania Location within the United States
- Location: Buchanan Trail E. (PA 16), Rouzerville, Washington Township, Pennsylvania
- Coordinates: 39°44′13″N 77°31′03″W
- Area: 21 acres (8.5 ha)
- Built: 1939
- Built by: Henry O. Smith, H. F. Smith
- Architectural style: Rustic Log Cabin
- NRHP reference No.: 96000083
- Added to NRHP: February 16, 1996

The Red Run Lodge was a historic American hotel complex that was located in Washington Township, Franklin County, Pennsylvania, USA.

It was listed on the National Register of Historic Places in 1996, but was torn down in December 2017.

== History and architectural features ==
This complex encompassed sixteen contributing buildings and one contributing structure (a stone wall). The buildings were the lodge, cabins, bath house, and a fruit stand. Built in 1939, they were made from chestnut logs with concrete chinking, and were designed in a "log cabin" style. The lodge and cabins closed circa 1965.

Until 1962, Red Run Lodge had a policy of refusing accommodations to Black people. The owners and operators of the lodge were charged with racial discrimination in 1961. A public hearing was avoided when the owners agreed to a consent order that established that the lodge would accommodate Black customers without discrimination.

== Gallery ==
Office
