= Blue Ridge Summit, Pennsylvania =

Unincorporated community in Pennsylvania, US

Blue Ridge Summit
- Census-designated place
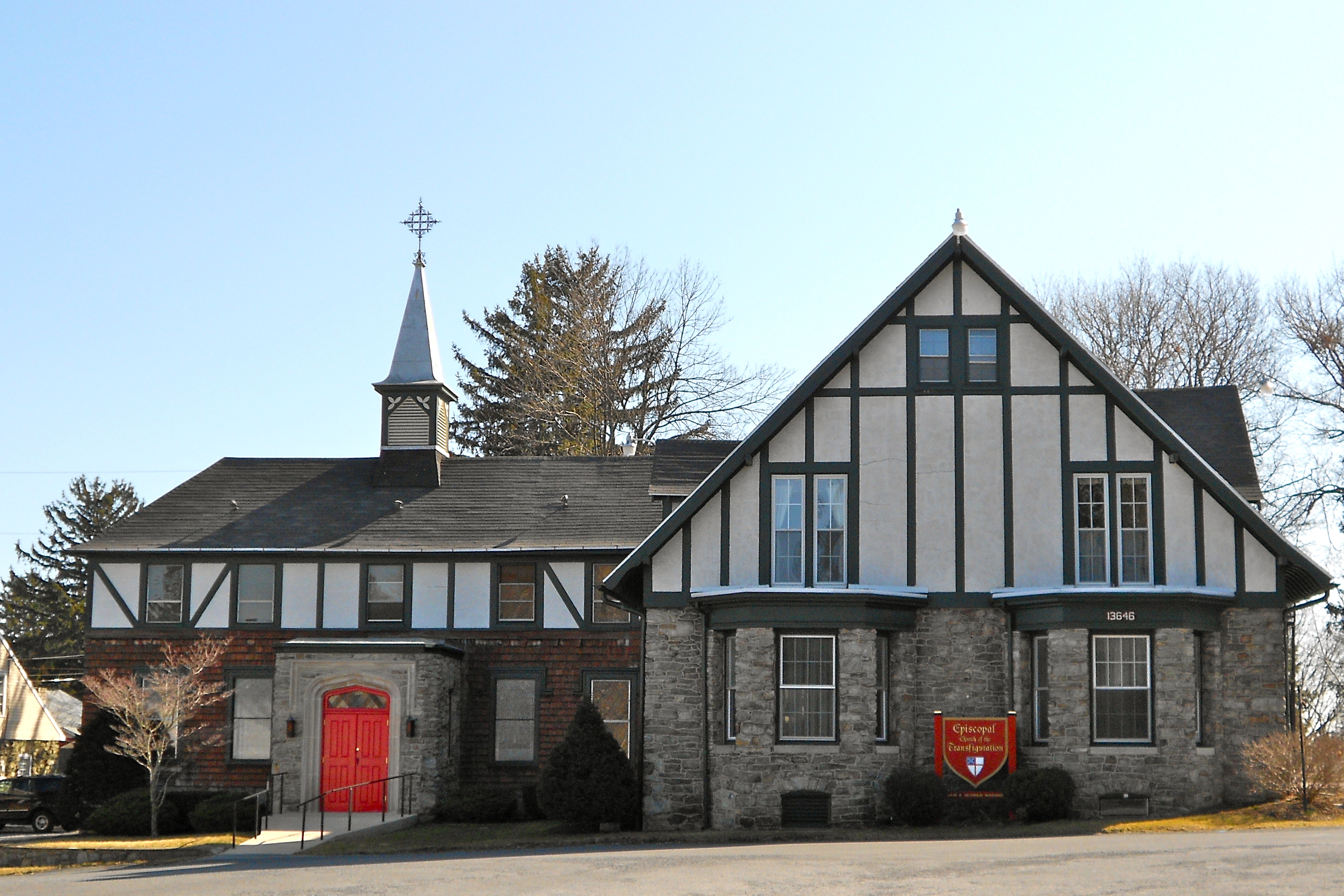
- Episcopal Church of the Transfiguration

- Location within Pennsylvania
- Coordinates: 39°43′32″N 77°28′08″W
- Country: United States
- State: Pennsylvania
- County: Franklin
- Township: Washington

Area
  - Total: 0.73 sq mi (1.90 km^{2})
  - Land: 0.73 sq mi (1.90 km^{2})
  - Water: 0 sq mi (0.00 km^{2})
- Elevation: 1,316 ft (401 m)

Population (2020)
  - Total: 887
  - Density: 1,207.8/sq mi (466.34/km^{2})
- ZIP Code: 17214
- Area code: 717
- FIPS code: 42-07312
- GNIS feature ID: 2634207

Blue Ridge Summit is an unincorporated community and census-designated place in Franklin County, Pennsylvania, United States, southwest of Gettysburg in the central part of the state, adjoining Pennsylvania's southern border with Maryland. It is less than 3 miles (5 km) east of Pen Mar, Maryland. The population of Blue Ridge Summit was 887 at the 2020 census.

The community was the birthplace of Wallis Simpson, the wife of Prince Edward, Duke of Windsor (previously King Edward VIII of the United Kingdom). It is also home to the Monterey Country Club, which has served as a summer retreat for many Washingtonians; and the American presidents Woodrow Wilson, Calvin Coolidge and Dwight D. Eisenhower all played the Monterey Country Club course.

== Geography ==
Blue Ridge Summit is located in the southeastern corner of Franklin County at the height of land on South Mountain, the northern extension of the Blue Ridge Mountains of Virginia. It is bordered to the east by Adams County and to the south by Frederick and Washington counties in Maryland. Directly to the south are the communities of Highfield and Cascade in Maryland.

Pennsylvania Route 16 passes through Blue Ridge Summit, leading east down the mountain to Emmitsburg, Maryland, and west downhill to Waynesboro. The highway elevation at Blue Ridge Summit is 1,330 feet (410 m), compared to elevations of 500 and 700 feet (150 and 210 m) east and west of the mountain, respectively. Mount Dunlop, overlooking Blue Ridge Summit to the west, rises to a summit of 1,700 feet (520 m). Monterey Pass is northwest and slightly downhill from the community along PA 16.

According to the U.S. Census Bureau, the Blue Ridge Summit CDP has an area of 0.72 square miles (1.86 km^{2}), all land.

== History ==
Historical population
Census	Pop.	Note	%±
2010	891		—
2020	887		−0.4%
U.S. Decennial Census

John Howard McClellan writes about the history of the Blue Ridge Summit region in his book Blue Ridge Summit: The Beginnings of a Resort Area:

After the introduction of the railroad in 1872, this area grew to become a lively and fashionable vacation community. The railroad ran to Baltimore and many of the city's elite constructed summer houses there, before the advent of air conditioning, to escape the urban heat. The region was in its hey-day at the beginning of the twentieth century. Many Washingtonians also enjoyed the resort, where several posh "boarding houses", precursors of the "Bed and Breakfast", catered to the comfort-seeking elite. It remained a resort area until its decline during the Depression of 1929 and the following years of limited travel during World War II (1939-1945).

=== Gettysburg campaign ===
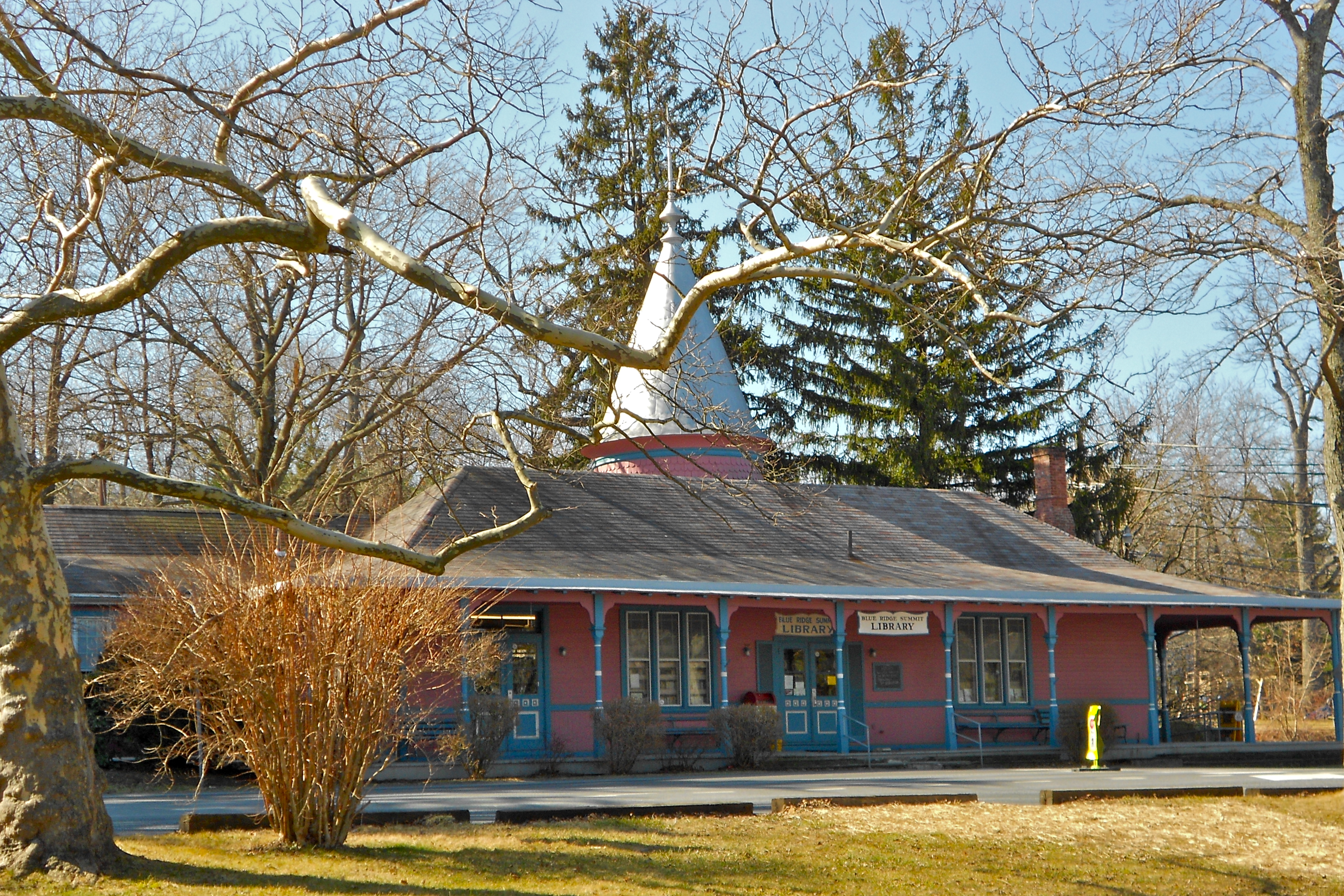
Blue Ridge Summit Library

During the American Civil War, at the time of the Gettysburg campaign of 1863, there were several cavalry skirmishes in and around Emmitsburg, Maryland – including Fountaindale, and Monterey Pass.

On June 22, the first skirmish occurred along the Monterey Mountain pass near Blue Ridge Summit. An armed civilian militia encountered a detachment of Confederates under General Albert G. Jenkins. The militia was forced to retreat after a very brief skirmish. General Jenkins and his Confederate troops withdrew toward Hagerstown, joining General Richard S. Ewell, who was advancing with a larger force.

Following the events at the Battle of Gettysburg, the Confederate Army retreated via Emmitsburg. On July 5, General J.E.B. Stuart's soldiers were engaged in some small skirmishes as he made his way back to General Robert E. Lee's army. A mountain swamp at Monterey Pass bogged down Stuart and the Army of Northern Virginia as they retreated. The Monterey Country Club sits upon 37 acres (150,000 m^{2}) that were once part of that swamp.

=== Other local interest ===
Former Vice President of the United States Dick Cheney sometimes resided in an underground complex near Blue Ridge Summit on Raven Rock Mountain when he was said to be "at an undisclosed location" in case of an attack on the United States. The complex, most commonly called "Site R" but also Raven Rock Mountain Complex or the Alternate Joint Communications Center, was created in 1951 as a command center in the event of attack on Washington, D.C.

== Notable people ==
- Upton Birnie Jr. (1877–1957), US Army major general, who maintained a summer home in Blue Ridge Summit
- Wallis Simpson, Duchess of Windsor, born in Blue Ridge Summit
- William J. Snow, major general in the United States Army
