= Franklin County, Pennsylvania =

County in Pennsylvania, United States

- County
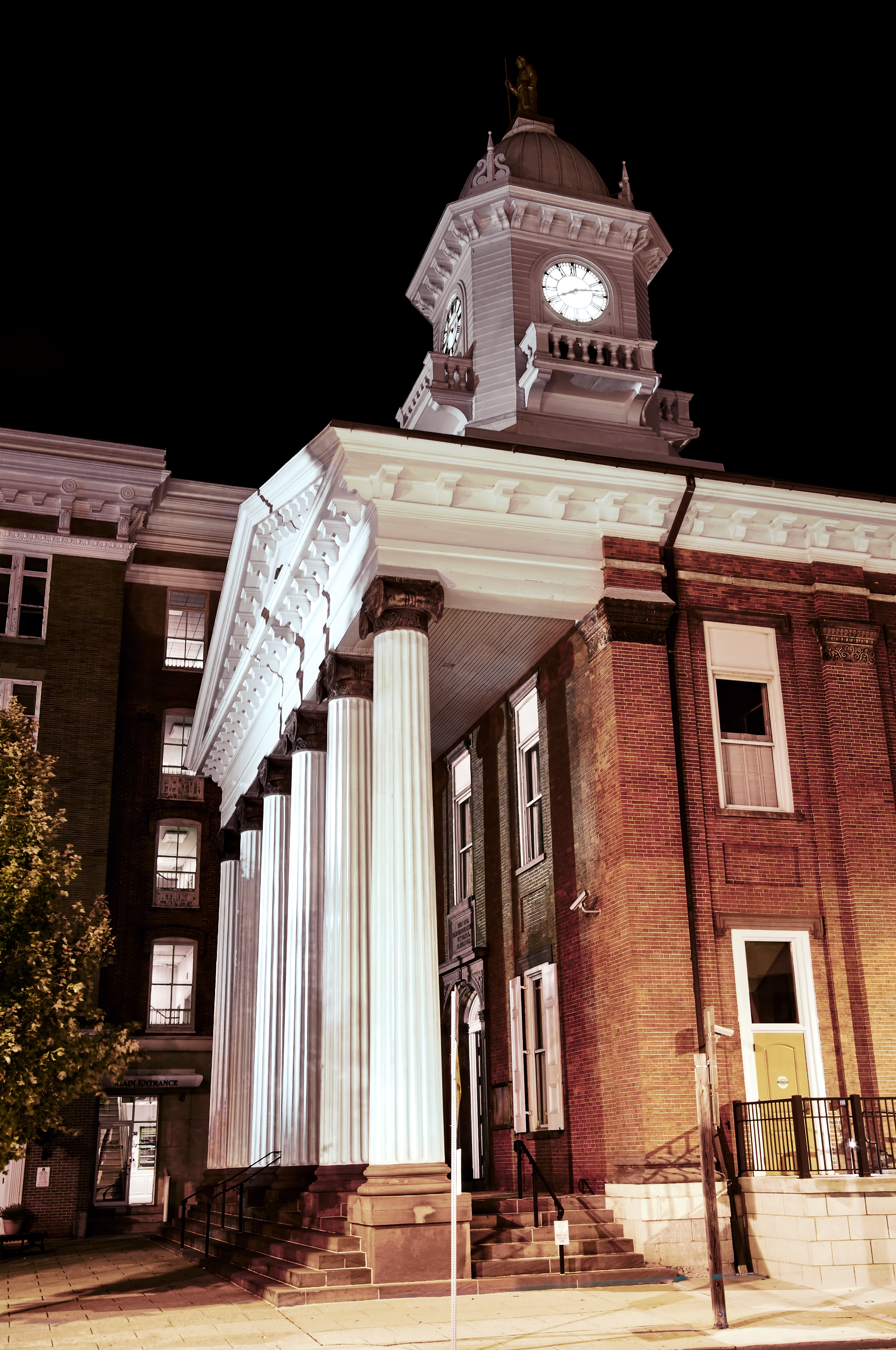
- Franklin County Courthouse in Chambersburg in October 2013

- Seal Logo

- Location within the U.S. state of Pennsylvania
- Coordinates: 39°56′N 77°43′W
- Country: United States
- State: Pennsylvania
- Founded: September 9, 1784
- Named for: Benjamin Franklin
- Seat: Chambersburg
- Largest borough: Chambersburg

Area
  - Total: 773 sq mi (2,000 km^{2})
  - Land: 772 sq mi (2,000 km^{2})
  - Water: 0.6 sq mi (1.6 km^{2}) 0.08%

Population (2020)
  - Total: 155,932
  - Estimate (2025): 160,652 ▲
  - Density: 206/sq mi (80/km^{2})
- Time zone: UTC−5 (Eastern)
  - Summer (DST): UTC−4 (EDT)
- Congressional district: 13th
- Website: www.franklincountypa.gov

Franklin County is a county in the Commonwealth of Pennsylvania. As of the 2020 census, the population was 155,932. Its county seat is Chambersburg.

Franklin County comprises the Chambersburg–Waynesboro, PA metropolitan statistical area, which is also included in the Washington–Baltimore combined statistical area. The county is part of the South Central region of the commonwealth. (Note: Includes Lancaster, York, Berks, Dauphin, Cumberland, Franklin, Lebanon, Adams and Perry Counties)

== History ==
Before 1729, Franklin County was originally settled by parts of the Shawnee tribe. Originally part of Lancaster County in 1729, then York County in 1749, then Cumberland County in 1750, Franklin County became an independent jurisdiction on September 9, 1784, soon after the end of the American Revolutionary War. It is named in honor of Founding Father Benjamin Franklin. In 1791, the Fifteenth president of the United States, James Buchanan, was born in Cove Gap, an Unincorporated township in Peters Township.

== Geography ==
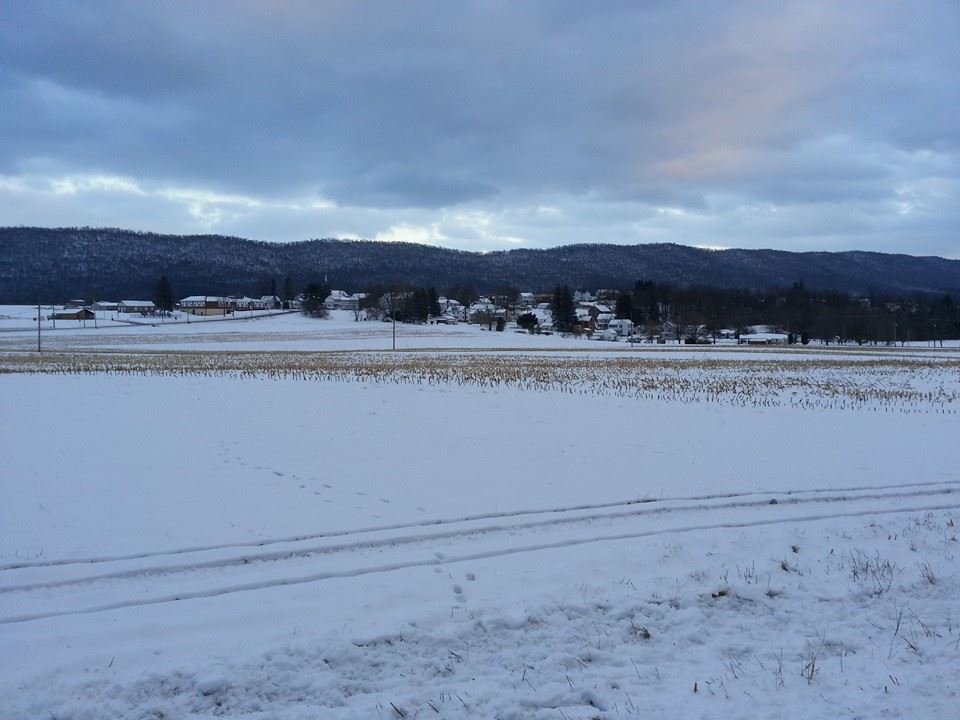
Fannettsburg in rural northwestern Franklin County

According to the U.S. Census Bureau, the county has a total area of 773 square miles (2,000 km^{2}), of which 772 square miles (2,000 km^{2}) is land and 0.6 square miles (1.6 km^{2}) (0.08%) is water.

Franklin County is in the watershed of the Chesapeake Bay and the overwhelming majority of it is drained by the Potomac River, but the Conodoguinet Creek and the Shermans Creek drain northeastern portions into the Susquehanna River. It has a hot-summer humid continental climate (Dfa) and its hardiness zone is 6b. Average monthly temperatures in Chambersburg range from 29.9 °F in January to 74.7 °F in July.

=== Adjacent counties ===
- Juniata County (north)
- Perry County (northeast)
- Cumberland County (northeast)
- Adams County (east)
- Frederick County, Maryland (southeast)
- Washington County, Maryland (south)
- Fulton County (west)
- Huntingdon County (northwest)

=== Major highways ===
- I-76 / Penna Turnpike
- I-81
- US 11
- US 30
- PA 16
- PA 75
- PA 163
- PA 316
- PA 433
- PA 997
- PA 233
- PA 274
- PA 416
- PA 456
- PA 533
- PA 641
- PA 696
- PA 995

== Demographics ==
Historical population
Census	Pop.	Note	%±
1790	15,662		—
1800	19,638		25.4%
1810	23,083		17.5%
1820	31,892		38.2%
1830	35,037		9.9%
1840	37,793		7.9%
1850	39,904		5.6%
1860	42,126		5.6%
1870	45,365		7.7%
1880	49,855		9.9%
1890	51,433		3.2%
1900	54,902		6.7%
1910	59,775		8.9%
1920	62,275		4.2%
1930	65,010		4.4%
1940	69,378		6.7%
1950	75,927		9.4%
1960	88,172		16.1%
1970	100,833		14.4%
1980	113,629		12.7%
1990	121,082		6.6%
2000	129,308		6.8%
2010	149,618		15.7%
2020	155,932		4.2%
2025 (est.)	160,652	▲	3.0%

=== Racial and ethnic composition ===
Franklin County, Pennsylvania – Racial and ethnic composition Note: the US Census treats Hispanic/Latino as an ethnic category. This table excludes Latinos from the racial categories and assigns them to a separate category. Hispanics/Latinos may be of any race.
Race / Ethnicity (NH = Non-Hispanic)	Pop 1980	Pop 1990	Pop 2000	Pop 2010	Pop 2020	% 1980	% 1990	% 2000	% 2010	% 2020
White alone (NH)	110,306	116,506	122,192	135,004	132,566	97.08%	96.22%	94.49%	90.23%	85.02%
Black or African American alone (NH)	2,054	2,699	2,891	4,348	4,998	1.81%	2.23%	2.24%	2.91%	3.21%
Native American or Alaska Native alone (NH)	79	160	179	230	242	0.07%	0.13%	0.14%	0.15%	0.16%
Asian alone (NH)	357	593	702	1,294	1,408	0.31%	0.49%	0.54%	0.86%	0.90%
Native Hawaiian or Pacific Islander alone (NH)	x	x	21	17	40	x	x	0.02%	0.01%	0.03%
Other race alone (NH)	187	59	116	142	501	0.16%	0.05%	0.09%	0.09%	0.32%
Mixed race or Multiracial (NH)	x	x	944	2,145	5,413	x	x	0.73%	1.43%	3.47%
Hispanic or Latino (any race)	646	1,065	2,268	6,438	10,764	0.57%	0.88%	1.75%	4.30%	6.90%
Total	113,629	121,082	129,313	149,618	155,932	100.00%	100.00%	100.00%	100.00%	100.00%

=== 2020 census ===
As of the 2020 census, the county had a population of 155,932. The median age was 42.2 years, 22.4% of residents were under the age of 18, and 20.6% of residents were 65 years of age or older. For every 100 females there were 95.7 males, and for every 100 females age 18 and over there were 93.2 males age 18 and over.

The racial makeup of the county was 86.3% White, 3.4% Black or African American, 0.3% American Indian and Alaska Native, 0.9% Asian, <0.1% Native Hawaiian and Pacific Islander, 3.3% from some other race, and 5.7% from two or more races. Hispanic or Latino residents of any race comprised 6.9% of the population.

55.5% of residents lived in urban areas, while 44.5% lived in rural areas.

There were 62,067 households in the county, of which 28.7% had children under the age of 18 living in them. Of all households, 52.7% were married-couple households, 16.2% were households with a male householder and no spouse or partner present, and 23.7% were households with a female householder and no spouse or partner present. About 26.1% of all households were made up of individuals and 12.7% had someone living alone who was 65 years of age or older.

There were 66,368 housing units, of which 6.5% were vacant. Among occupied housing units, 71.9% were owner-occupied and 28.1% were renter-occupied. The homeowner vacancy rate was 1.3% and the rental vacancy rate was 5.7%.

=== 2000 census ===
As of the 2000 census, there were 129,313 people, 50,633 households, and 36,405 families residing in the county. The population density was 168 people per square mile (65 people/km^{2}). There were 53,803 housing units at an average density of 70 units per square mile (27/km^{2}). The racial makeup of the county was 95.33% White, 2.33% Black or African American, 0.15% Native American, 0.55% Asian, 0.03% Pacific Islander, 0.74% from other races, and 0.86% from two or more races. 1.75% of the population were Hispanic or Latino of any race. 40.2% were of German, 19.4% American, 7.6% Irish and 6.0% English ancestry. 96.0% spoke English and 2.1% Spanish as their first language.

There were 50,633 households, out of which 30.80% had children under the age of 18 living with them, 60.00% were married couples living together, 8.20% had a female householder with no husband present, and 28.10% were non-families. 23.70% of all households were made up of individuals, and 10.70% had someone living alone who was 65 years of age or older. The average household size was 2.49 and the average family size was 2.94.

In the county, the population was spread out, with 24.00% under the age of 18, 7.90% from 18 to 24, 28.20% from 25 to 44, 23.70% from 45 to 64, and 16.00% who were 65 years of age or older. The median age was 38 years. For every 100 females there were 94.80 males. For every 100 females age 18 and over, there were 91.90 males.

In 2001, Franklin County was featured in David Brooks' article "One Nation, Slightly Divisible" in The Atlantic as a representative Red or Republican Party county.

== Government ==
=== County commissioners ===
- Dean Horst, chairman, Republican
- John Flannery, Republican
- Robert Ziobrowski, Democrat

=== Other county offices ===
- Clerk of Courts, Todd Rock
- Controller, Harold Wissinger
- Coroner, Jordan Conner
- District Attorney, Ian Brink
- Prothonotary, Timothy Sponseller
- Register and Recorder, Joy Heinbaugh
- Sheriff, Benjamin Sites
- Treasurer, Melody Shuman

=== State House of Representatives ===
- Rob W. Kauffman, Republican, Pennsylvania's 89th Representative District
- Chad Reichard, Republican, Pennsylvania's 90th Representative District
- Richard Irvin, Republican, Pennsylvania’s 81st Representative District

=== State Senate ===
- Greg Rothman, Republican, Pennsylvania's 34th Senatorial District
- Doug Mastriano, Republican, Pennsylvania's 33rd Senatorial District

=== United States House of Representatives ===
- John Joyce, Republican, Pennsylvania's 13th congressional district

== Politics ==
For most of its history, Franklin County has been a Republican Party stronghold in presidential elections, with only three Democratic Party candidates having managed to win the county from 1880 to the present day. The most recent Democrat to win the county in a presidential election was Lyndon B. Johnson, who won state-wide in the Pennsylvania election and in the national election, in a 1964 landslide. As a testament to the county's status as a Republican Party stronghold, Jimmy Carter in 1976 is the lone Democrat to win forty percent of the county's votes since Johnson's 1964 win.

=== Voter registration ===
As of November 4th, 2026, there are approximately 116,000 registered voters in the county. There are 61,383 registered Republicans, 23,279 registered Democrats, 11,351 voters registered non-affiliated voters, and 3,458 voters registered to other parties.

Chart of Voter Registration
1. Republican (61.7%)
2. Democratic (23.4%)
3. Independent (11.4%)
4. Other Parties (3.48%)

United States presidential election results for Franklin County, Pennsylvania
Year	Republican		Democratic		Third party(ies)	
Year	No.	%	No.	%	No.	%
1880	5,379	51.88%	4,964	47.88%	25	0.24%
1884	5,570	50.82%	5,261	48.00%	130	1.19%
1888	5,772	52.27%	5,082	46.02%	188	1.70%
1892	5,725	52.57%	4,965	45.59%	201	1.85%
1896	6,747	58.81%	4,425	38.57%	300	2.62%
1900	6,483	57.98%	4,500	40.24%	199	1.78%
1904	7,062	61.76%	4,114	35.98%	259	2.26%
1908	6,938	58.05%	4,682	39.17%	332	2.78%
1912	2,710	23.52%	4,505	39.10%	4,308	37.39%
1916	5,674	48.86%	5,336	45.95%	602	5.18%
1920	8,376	60.45%	5,020	36.23%	461	3.33%
1924	9,791	58.82%	5,770	34.67%	1,084	6.51%
1928	16,345	83.74%	3,027	15.51%	146	0.75%
1932	10,992	52.95%	9,338	44.99%	428	2.06%
1936	13,616	46.29%	15,632	53.15%	165	0.56%
1940	13,084	50.63%	12,713	49.20%	43	0.17%
1944	13,380	60.13%	8,807	39.58%	63	0.28%
1948	12,151	61.79%	7,352	37.39%	161	0.82%
1952	16,474	64.82%	8,868	34.89%	74	0.29%
1956	19,121	63.33%	11,060	36.63%	12	0.04%
1960	22,010	64.48%	12,088	35.41%	36	0.11%
1964	13,525	41.06%	19,332	58.68%	85	0.26%
1968	19,146	54.40%	11,451	32.54%	4,598	13.06%
1972	24,093	70.01%	9,456	27.48%	866	2.52%
1976	20,009	56.54%	14,643	41.38%	737	2.08%
1980	22,716	61.83%	12,061	32.83%	1,964	5.35%
1984	27,243	70.13%	11,480	29.55%	122	0.31%
1988	27,086	68.32%	12,368	31.20%	190	0.48%
1992	23,387	53.35%	13,440	30.66%	7,007	15.99%
1996	25,392	56.77%	14,980	33.49%	4,358	9.74%
2000	33,042	67.41%	14,922	30.44%	1,055	2.15%
2004	41,817	71.40%	16,562	28.28%	190	0.32%
2008	41,906	65.56%	21,169	33.12%	842	1.32%
2012	43,260	68.32%	18,995	30.00%	1,065	1.68%
2016	49,768	70.59%	17,465	24.77%	3,273	4.64%
2020	57,245	70.65%	22,422	27.67%	1,358	1.68%
2024	59,604	70.82%	23,543	27.97%	1,016	1.21%

United States Senate election results for Franklin County, Pennsylvania1
Year	Republican		Democratic		Third party(ies)	
Year	No.	%	No.	%	No.	%
1994	22,001	66.26%	10,287	30.98%	915	2.76%
2000	33,541	69.92%	13,594	28.34%	836	1.74%
2006	26,524	61.35%	16,710	38.65%	0	0.00%
2012	41,697	66.49%	19,726	31.46%	1,286	2.05%
2018	36,735	66.76%	17,385	31.59%	907	1.65%
2024	57,217	68.84%	23,591	28.38%	2,313	2.78%

United States Senate election results for Franklin County, Pennsylvania3
Year	Republican		Democratic		Third party(ies)	
Year	No.	%	No.	%	No.	%
1992	23,665	54.89%	15,773	36.59%	3,673	8.52%
1998	21,704	70.20%	8,210	26.55%	1,003	3.24%
2004	39,337	71.21%	13,126	23.76%	2,780	5.03%
2010	32,364	73.80%	11,487	26.20%	0	0.00%
2016	48,658	69.72%	17,827	25.54%	3,309	4.74%
2022	44,819	68.72%	18,718	28.70%	1,683	2.58%

Pennsylvania Gubernatorial election results for Franklin County
Year	Republican		Democratic		Third party(ies)	
Year	No.	%	No.	%	No.	%
1970	12,986	49.76%	11,972	45.88%	1,137	4.36%
1974	12,377	49.48%	12,261	49.01%	377	1.51%
1978	17,323	65.35%	9,014	34.00%	173	0.65%
1982	16,552	58.77%	11,496	40.82%	115	0.41%
1986	14,750	60.63%	9,429	38.76%	148	0.61%
1990	8,461	35.87%	15,126	64.13%	0	0.00%
1994	20,001	60.08%	10,016	30.09%	3,271	9.83%
1998	21,793	69.67%	6,527	20.87%	2,959	9.46%
2002	23,698	68.62%	10,335	29.93%	501	1.45%
2006	26,043	60.58%	16,945	39.42%	0	0.00%
2010	33,559	76.52%	10,295	23.48%	0	0.00%
2014	25,913	67.53%	12,461	32.47%	0	0.00%
2018	35,634	64.88%	18,447	33.59%	841	1.53%
2022	42,731	65.39%	21,612	33.07%	1,007	1.54%

=== United States Senate ===
- John Fetterman, Democrat
- Dave McCormick, Republican

== Education ==
=== Universities and colleges ===
- Wilson College
- Penn State Mont Alto

=== Technology school ===
- Franklin County Career and Technology Center
- Chambersburg Area Career Magnet School
- Triangle Tech

=== Intermediate unit ===
Lincoln Intermediate Unit (IU#12) region includes: Adams County, Franklin County and York County. The agency offers school districts, home-schooled students and private schools many services, including: special education services, combined purchasing, and instructional technology services. It runs Summer Academy, which offers both art and academic strands designed to meet the individual needs of gifted, talented and high achieving students. Additional services include: curriculum mapping, professional development for school employees, adult education, nonpublic school services, business services, migrant & ESL (English as a second language), instructional services, special education, management services, and technology services. It also provides a GED program to adults who want to earn a high school diploma and literacy programs. The Lincoln Intermediate Unit is governed by a 13-member board of directors, each a member of a local school board from the 25 school districts. Board members are elected by school directors of all 25 school districts for three-year terms that begin July 1. There are 29 intermediate units in Pennsylvania. They are funded by school districts, state and federal program specific funding and grants. IUs do not have the power to tax.

=== Public school districts ===
Public school districts include:

- Chambersburg Area School District
- Fannett-Metal School District (also in Perry County)
- Greencastle-Antrim School District
- Shippensburg Area School District (also in Cumberland County)
- Tuscarora School District
- Waynesboro Area School District

=== Private schools ===
- Anchor Christian Day School – Shippensburg
- Antrim Mennonite School – Greencastle
- Brook Side Amish School – Spring Run
- Calvary Mennonite School – Chambersburg
- Clearfield Parochial School – Shippensburg
- Conococheague Amish School – Spring Run
- Corpus Christi Catholic School – Chambersburg
- Cornell Abraxas Leadership Development Program
- Cornell Abraxas Youth Center – South Mountain
- Culbertson Mennonite School – Chambersburg
- Cumberland Valley Christian School – Chambersburg
- Emmanuel Christian School – Chambersburg
- Franklin Learning Center – Chambersburg
- Highfield Christian Academy – Blue Ridge Summit
- Living Word Academy – Blue Ridge Summit
- Maple Grove Amish School Dry Run
- McClays Mill Amish School – Newburg
- Meadow Brook Amish School – Spring Run
- Manito Day Treatment – Chambersburg
- Mercersburg Academy – Mercersburg
- Montessori Academy of Chambersburg
- Mountain View Amish School – Spring Run
- Mowersville Christian Academy – Newburg
- Noahs Ark Christian Church Center – Waynesboro
- Otterbein School – Shippensburg
- Path Valley Christian School – Doylesburg
- Portico River Brethren School – Chambersburg
- Providence School – Waynesboro
- St. Andrew the Apostle Catholic School – Waynesboro
- Shady Grove Mennonite School – Greencastle
- Shalom Christian Academy – Chambersburg
- South Mountain Secure Treatment Unit – South Mountain
- Stoney Creek Parochial School – Orrstown
- Sunset Amish School – Newburg
- Sweetwater Ridge School – Dry Run
- Sylvan Learning Center – Chambersburg
- Tunnel Run School – Newburg
- Visionquest-South Mountain Lodge – South Mountain
- Willow Hill Parochial School – Willow Hill

=== Libraries ===
The Franklin County Library system has five branches:

- Blue Ridge Summit Free Library – Blue Ridge Summit
- Coyle Free Library – Chambersburg
- Grove Family Library – Chambersburg
- Lilian S Besore Memorial Library – Greencastle
- St Thomas Branch Library – Saint Thomas

The system also supports the Alexander Hamilton Memorial Library in Waynesboro, PA. In addition, the system currently operates two bookmobiles.

== Recreation ==
There are four Pennsylvania state parks in Franklin County.

- Caledonia State Park straddles the Franklin and Adams County line along U.S. Route 30 between Chambersburg and Gettysburg.
- Buchanan's Birthplace State Park is the birthplace of the 15th President of the United States, James Buchanan.
- Mont Alto State Park is the oldest state park in Pennsylvania.
- Cowans Gap State Park is largely surrounded by Buchanan State Forest and straddles the Franklin and Fulton County border.

== Communities ==
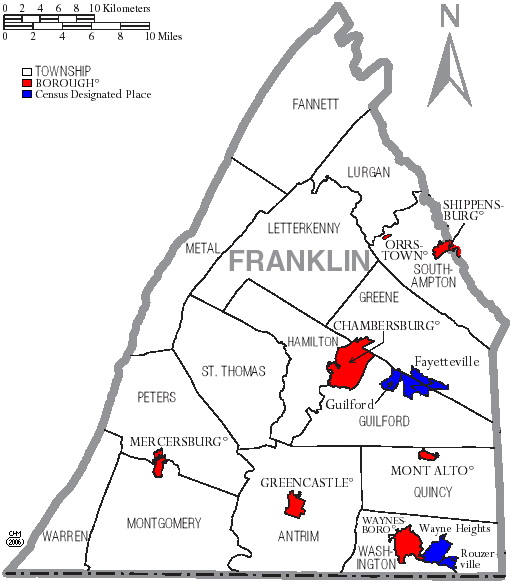
Map of Franklin County, Pennsylvania with municipal labels showing boroughs (in red), townships (in white), and census-designated places (in blue)

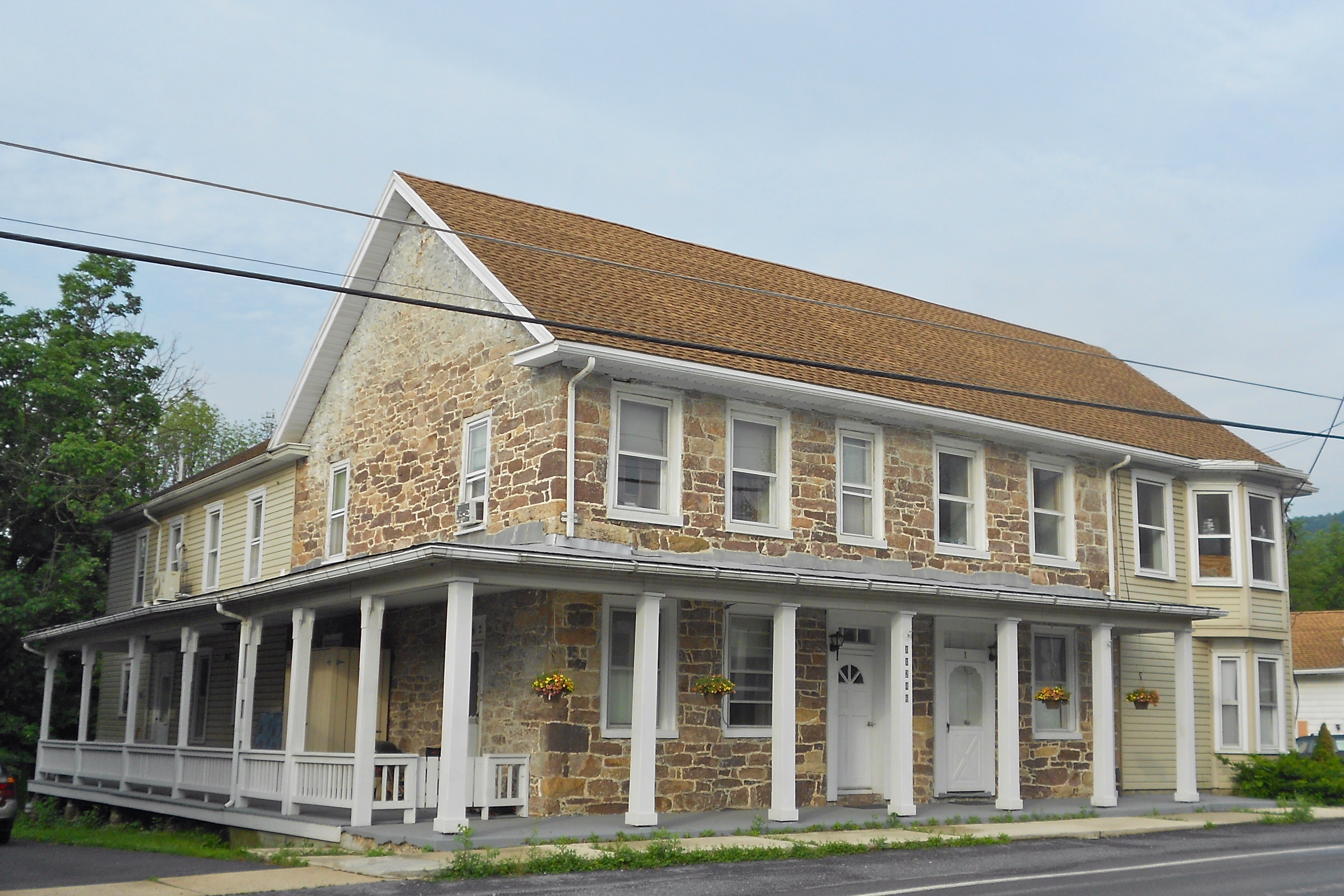
House in Roxbury in Lurgan Township

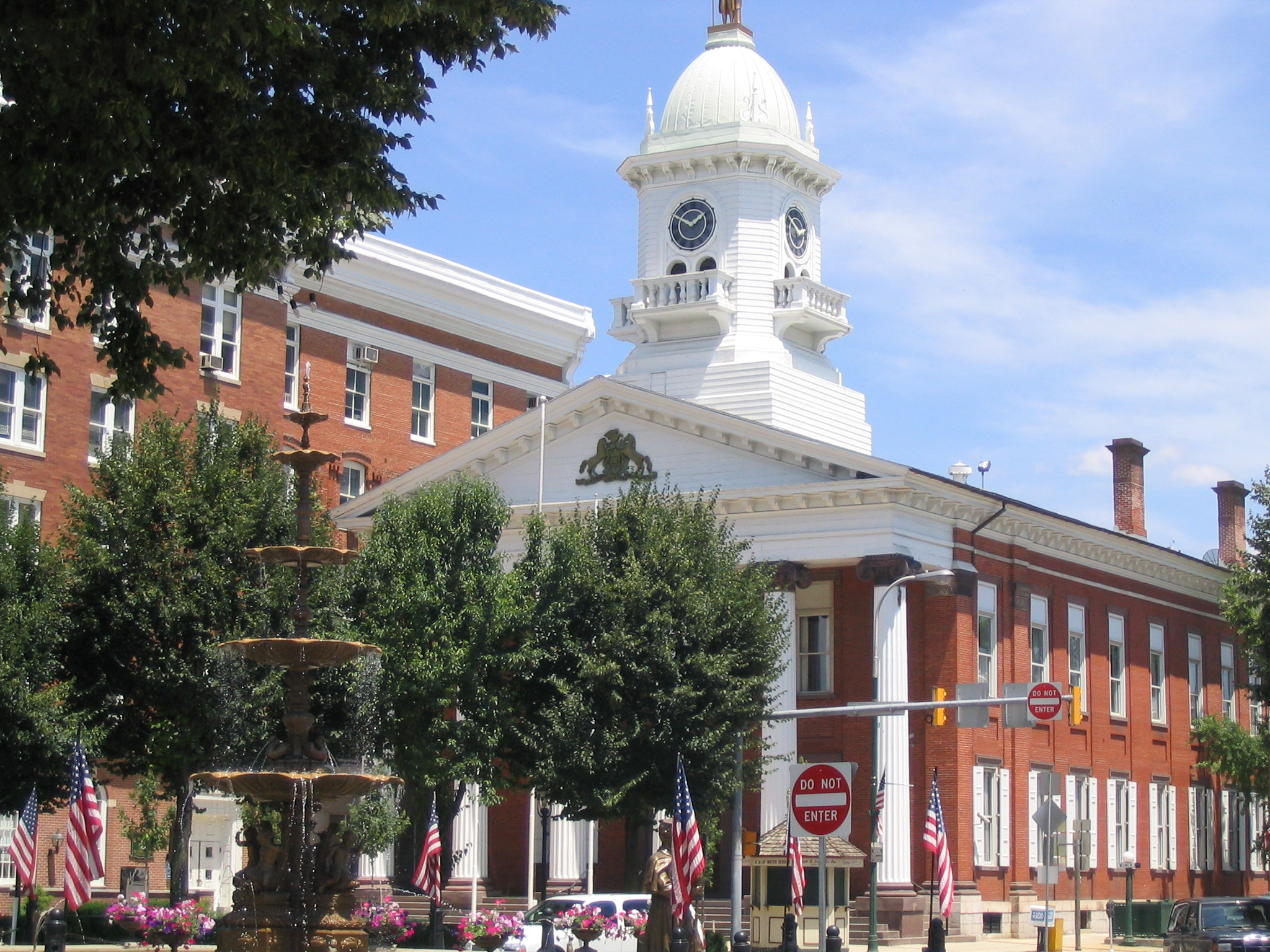
Chambersburg, the county seat and largest municipality in Franklin County

Under Pennsylvania law, there are four types of incorporated municipalities: cities, boroughs, townships, and, in at most two cases, towns. The following boroughs and townships are located in Franklin County:

=== Boroughs ===
- Chambersburg (county seat)
- Greencastle
- Mercersburg
- Mont Alto
- Orrstown
- Shippensburg (mostly in Cumberland County)
- Waynesboro

=== Townships ===
- Antrim Township
- Fannett Township
- Greene Township
- Guilford Township
- Hamilton Township
- Letterkenny Township
- Lurgan Township
- Metal Township
- Montgomery Township
- Peters Township
- Quincy Township
- Southampton Township
- St. Thomas Township
- Warren Township
- Washington Township

=== Census-designated places ===
Census-designated places are geographical areas designated by the U.S. Census Bureau for the purposes of compiling demographic data. They are not actual jurisdictions under Pennsylvania law. Other unincorporated communities, such as villages, may be listed here as well.

- Blue Ridge Summit
- Fayetteville
- Fort Loudon
- Guilford
- Marion
- Pen Mar
- Rouzerville
- Scotland
- State Line
- Wayne Heights

=== Population ranking ===
The population ranking of the following table is based on the 2010 census of Franklin County.

† county seat

Rank	City/Town/etc.	Municipal type	Population (2010 Census)
1	† Chambersburg	Borough	20,268
2	Waynesboro	Borough	10,568
3	Shippensburg (mostly in Cumberland County)	Borough	5,492
4	Greencastle	Borough	3,996
5	Fayetteville	CDP	3,128
6	State Line	CDP	2,709
7	Wayne Heights	CDP	2,545
8	Guilford	CDP	2,138
9	Mont Alto	Borough	1,705
10	Mercersburg	Borough	1,561
11	Scotland	CDP	1,395
12	Marion	CDP	953
13	Pen Mar	CDP	929
14	Rouzerville	CDP	917
15	Blue Ridge Summit	CDP	891
16	Fort Loudon	CDP	886
17	Orrstown	Borough	262

== See also ==
- National Register of Historic Places listings in Franklin County, Pennsylvania
- Bloom Brothers Department Stores
