= National Register of Historic Places listings in Franklin County, Pennsylvania =

Location of Franklin County in Pennsylvania

This is a list of the National Register of Historic Places listings in Franklin County, Pennsylvania.

This is intended to be a complete list of the properties and districts on the National Register of Historic Places in Franklin County, Pennsylvania, United States. The locations of National Register properties and districts for which the latitude and longitude coordinates are included below, may be seen in a map.

There are 65 properties and districts listed on the National Register in the county. Another property was once listed but has been removed.

This National Park Service list is complete through NPS recent listings posted April 24, 2026.

== Current listings ==
	Name on the Register	Image	Date listed	Location	City or town	Description
1	Angle Farm	Angle Farm	November 20, 1979 (#79002231)	Southeast of Mercersburg; 39°45′53″N 77°51′10″W	Montgomery Township	
2	Borough Hall of the Borough of Waynesboro	Borough Hall of the Borough of Waynesboro	December 2, 1980 (#80003496)	57 East Main Street; 39°45′18″N 77°34′36″W	Waynesboro	
3	Bridge between Guilford and Hamilton Townships	Bridge between Guilford and Hamilton Townships	June 22, 1988 (#88000776)	Legislative Route 28033 over Conococheague Creek near Social Island; 39°53′09″N 77°42′48″W	Guilford and Hamilton Townships	
4	Bridge in Metal Township	Bridge in Metal Township	June 22, 1988 (#88000763)	Legislative Route 45 Spur east over West Branch Conococheague Creek, near Willow Hill; 40°07′13″N 77°46′39″W	Metal Township	
5	Brotherton Farm	Brotherton Farm	March 30, 1979 (#79002227)	Southeast of Chambersburg on Falling Spring Road; 39°54′43″N 77°36′58″W	Guilford Township	
6	John Brown House	John Brown House	March 5, 1970 (#70000548)	225 East King Street; 39°56′20″N 77°39′29″W	Chambersburg	
7	Jeremiah Burns Farm	Jeremiah Burns Farm	August 15, 2002 (#02000065)	10988 Fish and Game Road; 39°45′58″N 77°31′47″W	Washington Township	
8	Carrick Furnace	Carrick Furnace	September 6, 1991 (#91001133)	Pennsylvania Route 75 north of Metal; 40°01′08″N 77°52′36″W	Metal Township	
9	Chambersburg and Bedford Turnpike Road Company Toll House	Chambersburg and Bedford Turnpike Road Company Toll House	January 3, 1978 (#78002404)	West of St. Thomas on U.S. Route 30; 39°54′47″N 77°48′50″W	St. Thomas Township	
10	Chambersburg Historic District	Chambersburg Historic District	August 26, 1982 (#82003789)	U.S. Routes 11 and 30; 39°55′44″N 77°39′41″W	Chambersburg	
11	Church Hill Farm	Church Hill Farm	December 2, 1980 (#80003498)	Northeast of Mercersburg at 8941 Kings Lane; 39°50′21″N 77°51′11″W	Peters Township	
12	Coldbrook Farm	Coldbrook Farm	March 28, 1996 (#96000321)	955 Spring Lane; 39°56′07″N 77°38′32″W	Chambersburg	
13	Corker Hill	Corker Hill	March 18, 2003 (#03000131)	1237 Garver Lane, Scotland; 39°58′27″N 77°34′51″W	Greene Township	
14	Culbertson–Harbison Farm	Culbertson–Harbison Farm	June 27, 1980 (#80003499)	South of Nyesville on Nyesville Road; 40°01′02″N 77°37′44″W	Greene Township	
15	Widow Donaldson Place	Widow Donaldson Place	November 5, 1987 (#87001983)	177 Bear Valley Road near Fort Loudon; 39°54′48″N 77°53′45″W	Peters Township	
16	Findlay Farm	Findlay Farm	April 21, 1983 (#83002245)	6801 Findlay Road near Lamasters; 39°49′50″N 77°51′55″W	Peters Township	
17	James Finley House	James Finley House	November 19, 1974 (#74001783)	Building No. 505, Letterkenny Army Depot; 39°59′56″N 77°38′19″W	Greene Township	
18	Franklin County Courthouse	Franklin County Courthouse	January 18, 1974 (#74001784)	1 North Main Street, on Memorial Sq. 39°56′15″N 77°39′38″W	Chambersburg	
19	Franklin County Jail	Franklin County Jail	January 21, 1970 (#70000549)	Northwestern corner of King and 2nd Streets; 39°56′21″N 77°39′33″W	Chambersburg	
20	Franklin Furnace Historic District	Franklin Furnace Historic District	September 6, 1991 (#91001136)	Roughly bounded by Circle Drive and Cinder Street, near Edenville; 39°57′32″N 77°49′21″W	St. Thomas Township	
21	Gass House	Gass House	April 11, 1977 (#77001168)	East of Chambersburg off U.S. Route 30; 39°55′46″N 77°37′46″W	Guilford Township	
22	Greencastle Historic District	Greencastle Historic District	December 24, 1992 (#92001722)	Roughly bounded by Washington, Pennsylvania Route 2002, Jefferson, Mifflin, Chambers, Grant and Allison, and Baltimore north to Spring Grove; 39°47′20″N 77°43′30″W	Greencastle	
23	Alexander Hamilton House	Alexander Hamilton House	June 27, 1980 (#80003501)	45 East Main Street; 39°45′18″N 77°34′35″W	Waynesboro	
24	Handycraft Farmstead	Handycraft Farmstead	August 22, 2002 (#02000893)	11071 Country Club Road; 39°45′49″N 77°32′03″W	Washington Township	
25	Harbaugh's Reformed Church	Harbaugh's Reformed Church	March 20, 2002 (#02000228)	14301 and 14269 Harbaugh Church Road; 39°43′16″N 77°32′02″W	Washington Township	
26	Hays Bridge Historic District	Hays Bridge Historic District	July 31, 1978 (#78002402)	East of Mercersburg on Pennsylvania Routes 331 and 328; 39°47′19″N 77°51′15″W	Montgomery Township	
27	Horse Valley Bridge	Horse Valley Bridge	June 22, 1988 (#88000775)	Legislative Route 28093 over Conodoguinet Creek near Upper Strasburg; 40°03′57″N 77°45′34″W	Letterkenny Township	
28	Irwinton Historic District	Irwinton Historic District	December 26, 2012 (#12001096)	9717 & 9685 Anderson Rd. 39°47′22″N 77°50′56″W	Montgomery Township	
29	Robert Kennedy Memorial Presbyterian Church	Robert Kennedy Memorial Presbyterian Church	June 6, 2009 (#09000385)	11799 Mercersburg Road; 39°45′51″N 77°51′09″W	Montgomery Township	
30	Lane House	Lane House	January 13, 1972 (#72001123)	14 North Main Street; 39°49′44″N 77°54′17″W	Mercersburg	
31	Mansfield	Mansfield	April 26, 1979 (#79002232)	Southeast of Mercersburg; 39°47′34″N 77°51′44″W	Montgomery Township	
32	Martin's Mill Covered Bridge	Martin's Mill Covered Bridge	February 15, 1974 (#74001786)	Southwest of Greencastle over Conococheague Creek; 39°45′53″N 77°46′33″W	Antrim Township	
33	Masonic Temple	Masonic Temple	June 18, 1976 (#76001640)	74 South 2nd Street; 39°56′09″N 77°39′33″W	Chambersburg	
34	McClay's Twin Bridge (East)	McClay's Twin Bridge (East)	June 22, 1988 (#88000777)	Legislative Route 28010 over a tributary of Conodoguinet Creek, near Middle Spring; 40°05′54″N 77°34′15″W	Lurgan and Southampton Townships	
35	McClay's Twin Bridge (West)	McClay's Twin Bridge (West)	June 22, 1988 (#88000779)	Legislative Route 28010 over Conodoguinet Creek, near Middle Spring; 40°05′53″N 77°34′12″W	Lurgan Township	
36	McCoy–Shoemaker Farm	McCoy–Shoemaker Farm	June 27, 1980 (#80003500)	Southwest of Upton on Pennsylvania Route 995; 39°47′57″N 77°49′20″W	Peters Township	
37	Memorial Fountain and Statue	Memorial Fountain and Statue	May 19, 1978 (#78002400)	Memorial Square; 39°56′15″N 77°39′41″W	Chambersburg	
38	Mercersburg Academy	Mercersburg Academy	June 21, 1984 (#84003374)	Pennsylvania Route 16; 39°49′34″N 77°53′54″W	Mercersburg	
39	Mercersburg Historic District	Mercersburg Historic District	December 13, 1978(boundary increase May 17, 1989) (#78002403)	Main and Seminary Streets; 39°49′38″N 77°54′12″W	Mercersburg	
40	Millmont Farm	Millmont Farm	April 27, 1979 (#79002233)	East of Mercersburg at the junction of Pennsylvania Routes 16 and 416; 39°48′16″N 77°52′24″W	Montgomery Township	
41	Mitchell-Shook House	Mitchell-Shook House	September 17, 1980 (#80003497)	Leitersburg Street; 39°46′48″N 77°43′26″W	Greencastle	
42	Monterey Historic District	Monterey Historic District	April 22, 1976 (#76001639)	Off Pennsylvania Route 16 near Blue Ridge Summit; 39°44′10″N 77°28′09″W	Washington Township	
43	Mt. Pleasant Iron Works House	Mt. Pleasant Iron Works House	December 31, 1974 (#74001785)	About 4 miles (6.4 km) north of Fort Loudon on Pennsylvania Route 75; 39°57′53″N 77°53′58″W	Metal Township	
44	Old Brown's Mill School	Old Brown's Mill School	March 7, 1973 (#73001632)	Off U.S. Route 11 near Kauffman; 39°49′50″N 77°42′08″W	Antrim Township	
45	Joseph J. Oller House	Joseph J. Oller House	June 28, 1996 (#96000707)	138 West Main Street; 39°45′26″N 77°34′53″W	Waynesboro	
46	Peerless Furniture Company		November 18, 2021 (#100007142)	40 Lurgan Ave. 40°02′42″N 77°32′05″W	Shippensburg	
47	Red Run Lodge	Red Run Lodge	February 16, 1996 (#96000083)	Buchanan Trail East (Pennsylvania Route 16) near Rouzerville; 39°44′13″N 77°31′03″W	Washington Township	
48	Rock Hill Farm	Rock Hill Farm	July 28, 1999 (#99000880)	12995 and 12755 Bain Road near Mercersburg; 39°45′07″N 77°52′08″W	Montgomery Township	
49	Rocky Spring Presbyterian Church	Rocky Spring Presbyterian Church	May 13, 1994 (#94000430)	Rocky Spring Road, approximately 0.5 miles (0.80 km) northwest of Funk Road; 39°59′19″N 77°40′35″W	Letterkenny Township	
50	Royer–Nicodemus House and Farm	Royer–Nicodemus House and Farm	August 28, 1976 (#76001641)	1010 East Main Street; 39°44′35″N 77°33′44″W	Waynesboro	
51	Mary B. Sharpe School		May 23, 2024 (#100010358)	850 Broad Street; 39°56′44″N 77°39′03″W	Chambersburg	
52	Skinner Tavern	Skinner Tavern	July 27, 2005 (#05000757)	13361 Upper Strasburg Road; 40°04′07″N 77°45′53″W	Letterkenny Township	
53	Spring Grove Farm and Distillery	Spring Grove Farm and Distillery	August 10, 1979 (#79002229)	Northwest of Greencastle on Williamsport Pike; 39°45′33″N 77°45′31″W	Antrim Township	
54	Springdale Mills	Springdale Mills	September 18, 1975 (#75001642)	Southeast of Waynesboro off Pennsylvania Route 16 on Amsterdam Road; 39°44′05″N 77°32′56″W	Washington Township	
55	Stover–Winger Farm	Stover–Winger Farm	August 24, 1979 (#79002230)	Leitersburg Road near Greencastle; 39°46′44″N 77°43′12″W	Antrim Township	
56	Townhouse Row	Townhouse Row	December 18, 1978 (#78002401)	57–85 North Main Street; 39°56′20″N 77°39′40″W	Chambersburg	
57	Waynesboro Armory	Waynesboro Armory	December 22, 1989 (#89002080)	410 North Grant Street near Waynesboro; 39°45′56″N 77°34′45″W	Waynesboro	
58	Waynesboro Historic District	Waynesboro Historic District	April 24, 2020 (#100005205)	Main St. corridor between Franklin St., and Clayton Ave., and Clayton Ave. between Main St. and 5th St., including adjacent blocks and cross streets 39°45′20″N 77°34′40″W	Waynesboro	
59	Welty's Mill Bridge	Welty's Mill Bridge	January 6, 1983 (#83002246)	South of Waynesboro on Pennsylvania Route 997; 39°44′16″N 77°34′20″W	Washington Township	
60	White House Inn	White House Inn	February 27, 1986 (#86000304)	10111 Lincoln Way West; 39°54′13″N 77°51′15″W	Peters Township	
61	Wilson College	Wilson College	July 21, 1995 (#95000888)	1015 Philadelphia Avenue; 39°57′02″N 77°39′20″W	Chambersburg	
62	Woodland	Woodland	September 20, 1973 (#73001633)	Southwest of St. Thomas on Pennsylvania Route 416; 39°53′50″N 77°50′03″W	St. Thomas Township	
63	Col. John Work House	Col. John Work House	November 20, 1979 (#79002234)	Southeast of Mercersburg; 39°47′48″N 77°56′27″W	Montgomery Township	
64	Yeakle's Mill Bridge	Yeakle's Mill Bridge	November 14, 1988 (#88002169)	Legislative Route 28042 over Little Cove Creek; 39°44′06″N 78°02′15″W	Warren Township	Replaced in 2007
65	Zion Reformed Church	Zion Reformed Church	December 17, 1979 (#79002228)	South Main and West Liberty Streets; 39°55′58″N 77°39′45″W	Chambersburg	

== Former listing ==
	Name on the Register	Image	Date listed	Date removed	Location	City or town	Description
1	J. Allison Eyster Farmstead		unknown (#65008819)	May 8, 2017	Guilford Spring Rd.	Chambersburg	

== See also ==
- List of National Historic Landmarks in Pennsylvania
- National Register of Historic Places listings in Pennsylvania
- List of Pennsylvania state historical markers in Franklin County
