= Pennsylvania Route 416 =

State highway in Franklin County, Pennsylvania, US

Pennsylvania Route 416

Route information
- Maintained by PennDOT
- Length: 17.447 mi (28.078 km)

Major junctions
- South end: Cearfoss Pike at the Maryland state line near Nova
- PA 995 in Welsh Run; PA 16 in Mercersburg; PA 75 in Mercersburg
- North end: US 30 in St. Thomas Township

Location
- Country: United States
- State: Pennsylvania
- Counties: Franklin

Highway system
- Pennsylvania State Route System; Interstate; US; State; Scenic; Legislative
← PA 415	→ PA 417

Pennsylvania Route 416 (PA 416) is a 17.4-mile-long (28.0 km) state highway located in Franklin County, Pennsylvania. The southern terminus is at the Maryland state line near Nova, where the road continues into that state as Cearfoss Pike, leading to Maryland Route 58 (MD 58). The northern terminus is at U.S. Route 30 (US 30) in St. Thomas Township. PA 416 is a two-lane undivided road that runs through farmland in southwestern Franklin County. The route heads northwest from the state line and crosses PA 995 in Welsh Run before it bends northeast and reaches an intersection with PA 16. PA 416 turns northwest for a concurrency with PA 16 and heads to Mercersburg, where PA 75 joins the two routes. PA 75 and PA 416 split from PA 16 and head northeast out of Mercersburg. PA 416 splits from PA 75 and continues northeast to its terminus at US 30. PA 416 was designated in 1928 between PA 16 in Mercersburg and US 30 near St. Thomas. In 1937, the route was extended south from Mercersburg to the Maryland border.

== Route description ==
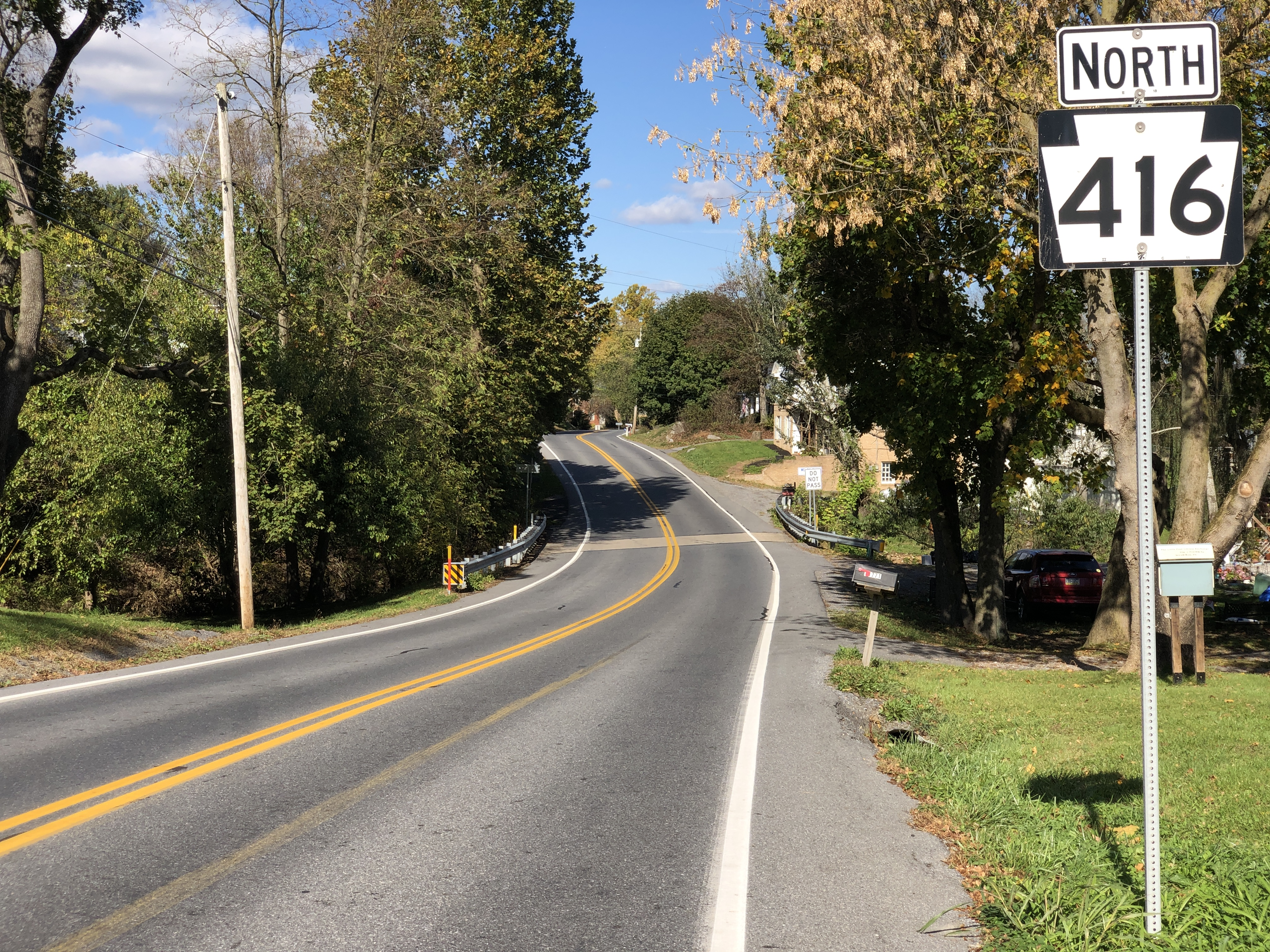
PA 416 northbound past PA 995 in Welsh Run

PA 416 begins at the Maryland border in Montgomery Township, heading northwest on two-lane undivided Mercersburg Road. The road continues into Maryland as Cearfoss Pike, which becomes MD 58 after intersecting MD 63 at a roundabout. From the state line, the route heads through a mix of farms and woods with some homes, passing through the community of Nova. PA 416 continues into open farmland and intersects PA 995 in Welsh Run. The route continues northwest before making a curve to the northeast and reaching an intersection with PA 16. At this point, PA 416 turns west to form a concurrency with PA 16 on Buchanan Trail, heading northwest through more agricultural areas. The road continues to the borough of Mercersburg, where PA 75 joins and it heads into residential areas.

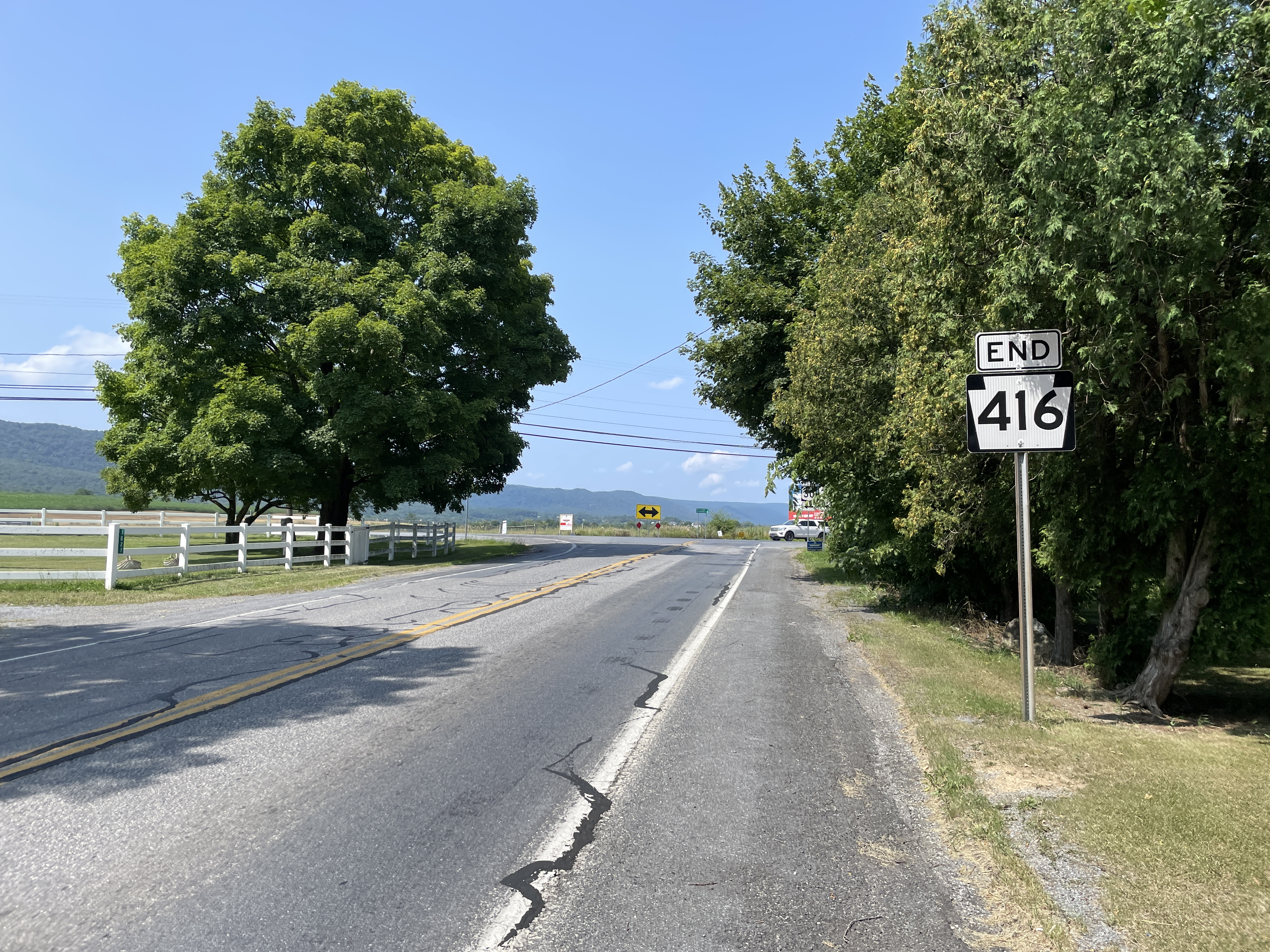
PA 416 northbound approaching terminus at U.S. 30 in St. Thomas Township

The three routes turn north onto Main Street and passes homes and businesses in the center of Mercersburg. In the northern part of the borough, PA 16 heads to the northwest with PA 75 and PA 416 continuing northeast on Fort Loudon Road. The road passes a few residential and commercial areas before crossing into Peters Township and heading into agricultural surroundings. PA 416 splits from PA 75 by continuing northeast on Mercersburg Road. The road crosses the West Branch Conococheague Creek and passes through the community of Markes. PA 416 passes through more open farmland as it continues into St. Thomas Township and reaches its northern terminus at US 30.

== History ==
When Pennsylvania legislated routes in 1911, the present alignment of PA 416 was not assigned a number. PA 416 was designated in 1928 to run from PA 16 in Mercersburg northeast to US 30 west of St. Thomas along a paved road. By 1930, the current alignment of the route between the Maryland border and PA 16 east of Mercersburg was an unnumbered, unpaved road. PA 416 was extended south from Mercersburg to the Maryland border southeast of Welsh Run in 1937, following its present alignment. The entire length of the route was paved in the 1930s.

== Major intersections ==
The entire route is in Franklin County.

Location	mi	km	Destinations	Notes
Montgomery Township	0.000	0.000	Cearfoss Pike to MD 58 – Hagerstown	Maryland state line; southern terminus
Montgomery Township	4.073	6.555	PA 995 (Welsh Run Road) – Claylick, Upton	
Montgomery Township	7.415	11.933	PA 16 east (Buchanan Trail) – Greencastle	South end of PA 16 concurrency
Mercersburg	9.448	15.205	PA 75 south (Fort Loudon Road) – Shimpstown, Claylick, Kasiesville	South end of PA 75 concurrency
Mercersburg	10.183	16.388	PA 16 west (Buchanan Trail) – McConnellsburg	North end of PA 16 concurrency
Peters Township	11.332	18.237	PA 75 north (Fort Loudon Road) – Fort Loudon	North end of PA 75 concurrency
St. Thomas Township	17.447	28.078	US 30 (Lincoln Way) – McConnellsburg, Chambersburg	Northern terminus
1.000 mi = 1.609 km; 1.000 km = 0.621 mi: Concurrency terminus
