= Pennsylvania Route 16 =

State highway in Pennsylvania, US

Pennsylvania Route 16

Route information
- Maintained by PennDOT
- Length: 43.146 mi (69.437 km)
- Existed: 1928–present

Major junctions
- West end: US 522 in McConnellsburg
- PA 456 near Cove Gap; PA 75 / PA 416 in Mercersburg; PA 995 in Upton; US 11 in Greencastle; I-81 in Greencastle; PA 316 in Waynesboro; PA 997 in Waynesboro; PA 116 in Carroll Valley
- East end: MD 140 in Liberty Township

Location
- Country: United States
- State: Pennsylvania
- Counties: Fulton, Franklin, Adams

Highway system
- Pennsylvania State Route System; Interstate; US; State; Scenic; Legislative
← PA 15	→ PA 17

Pennsylvania Route 16 (PA 16) is a 43-mile-long (69 km) east–west state route located in southern Pennsylvania, United States. The western terminus of the route is at U.S. Route 522 (US 522) in McConnellsburg. The eastern terminus is at the Mason–Dixon line in Liberty Township, where the road continues into Maryland as Maryland Route 140 (MD 140). PA 16 is a two-lane road that runs through rural areas in Fulton, Franklin, and Adams counties. The route heads east from McConnellsburg and crosses Tuscarora Mountain into Franklin County, where it continues east into the agricultural Cumberland Valley. Here, the passes through Mercersburg, Greencastle, and Waynesboro. PA 16 heads east through the South Mountain range, where it heads into Adams County and passes through Carroll Valley before coming to the Maryland border. PA 16 intersects several roads including PA 456 in Cove Gap, PA 75 and PA 416 in Mercersburg, PA 995 in Upton, US 11 and Interstate 81 (I-81) in Greencastle, PA 316 and PA 997 in Waynesboro, and PA 116 in Carroll Valley. The road's main name is Buchanan Trail in honor of 15th President James Buchanan, who was born near the road in Cove Gap.

The section of the road between Mercersburg and the Maryland border was constructed as part of two 19th-century turnpikes which served as part of a travel route between Pittsburgh and Baltimore. The state took over the road in 1917 and it became a part of the Buchanan Highway, which ran between Mount Union and the Maryland border in Carroll Valley. The section of the present route in McConnellsburg became part of the Lincoln Highway in 1913, PA 1 in 1924, and US 30 in 1926, with PA 1 removed from US 30 two years later. PA 16 was designated in 1928 to run along the Buchanan Trail between US 30 (Lincoln Way) in McConnellsburg and MD 32 (now MD 140) at the Maryland border southeast of Carroll Valley, replacing the previous PA 51 designation that had been assigned to the road a year earlier. A related route PA 851 is evidence of the route's former designation. The route was realigned across South Mountain by 1941. The west end of PA 16 was extended along Lincoln Way to US 522 in 1967 after US 30 was rerouted to bypass McConnellsburg to the north.

== Route description ==
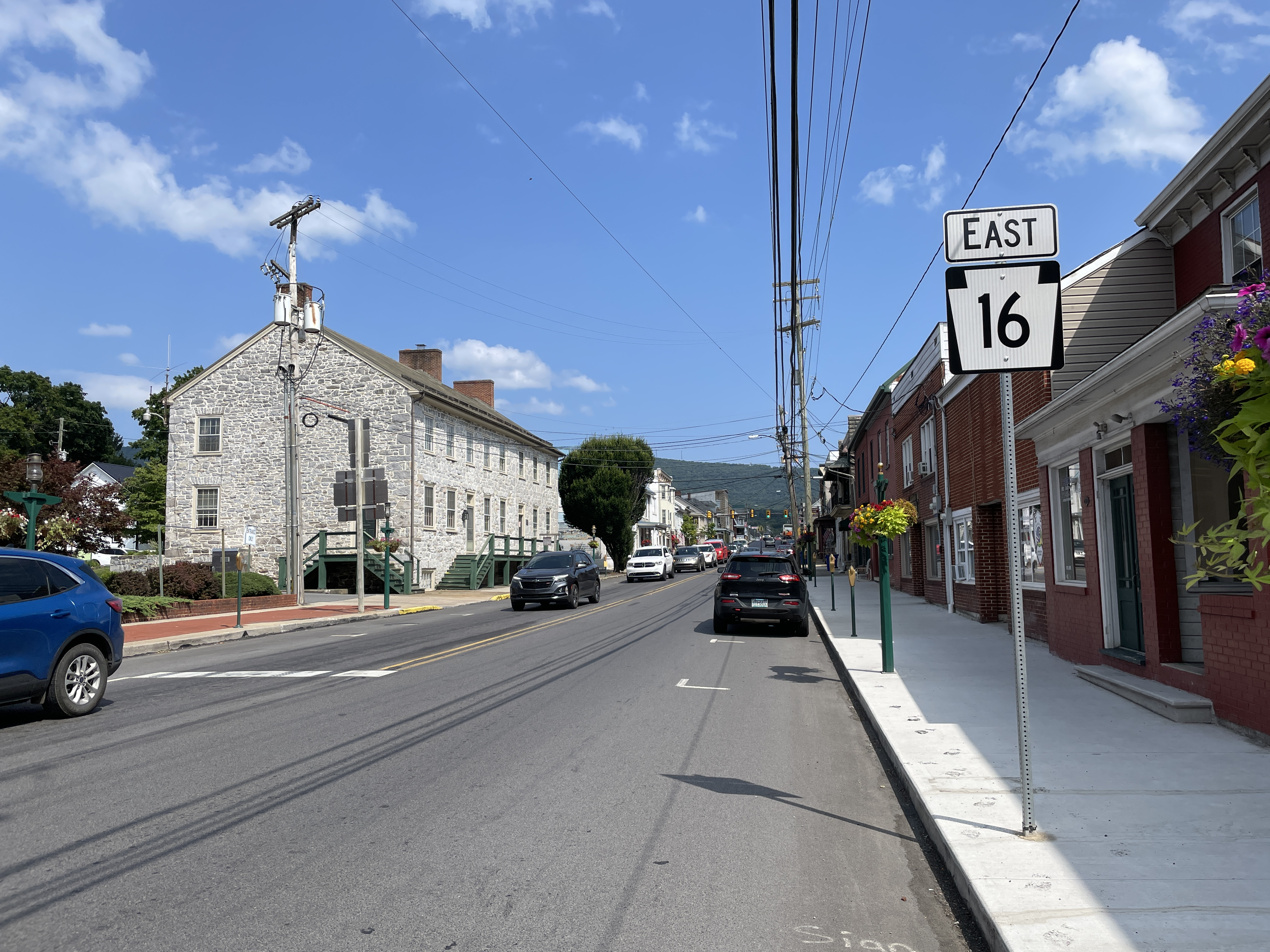
PA 16 eastbound past US 522 in McConnellsburg

PA 16 begins at an intersection with US 522 in the center of the borough of McConnellsburg in Fulton County, heading east-southeast on two-lane undivided Lincoln Way. The road runs through the commercial downtown before continuing into residential areas. The route splits from Lincoln Way by turning southeast onto Buchanan Trail and enters Ayr Township, running past businesses before heading near homes and passing to the northeast of an industrial building. PA 16 heads into forested areas and curves south to ascend Tuscarora Mountain. At the summit of the mountain, the route enters Peters Township in Franklin County and continues south to descend the mountain on Buchanan Trail West, passing to the west of a tract of Buchanan State Forest. PA 16 continues through forested areas at the base of the mountain and comes to an intersection with the northern terminus of PA 456, where it turns to the east. The road winds east and passes to the south of Buchanan's Birthplace State Park, where 15th President James Buchanan was born. The route passes through a gap in Cove Mountain and reaches the community of Cove Gap, where it turns southeast into wooded residential areas and passes through Charlestown.

PA 16 enters the Cumberland Valley and heads into agricultural areas before it passes near residential subdivisions. The road crosses into the borough of Mercersburg and continues past homes before running past a few businesses. The route turns south and comes to an intersection with PA 75/PA 416, where those two routes head south for a concurrency with PA 16. The three routes follow Main Street past homes and businesses in the center of Mercersburg. The road turns southeast into residential and becomes Buchanan Trail West again, with PA 75 splitting to the south. PA 16/PA 416 continue southeast and leave Mercersburg for Montgomery Township, heading through agricultural areas. PA 416 splits from PA 16 by turning south, and PA 16 curves east and crosses the West Branch Conococheague Creek. The road continues through farmland with some woods and homes and reaches an intersection with PA 995. Here, PA 995 turns east for a concurrency with PA 16, and the two routes head into Peters Township. In the residential community of Upton, PA 995 splits to the north while PA 16 continues east-southeast through farm fields with some woods and homes, crossing into Antrim Township. The road passes near housing developments before running through more rural land with some development and curving east to cross Conococheague Creek. The route continues east and enters the borough of Greencastle, where it becomes West Baltimore Street and passes a few homes before it comes to an intersection with US 11 in a business area. Past this intersection, PA 16 crosses under Norfolk Southern's Lurgan Branch railroad line and heads into the downtown area of Greencastle, coming to a traffic circle at Carlisle Street. From here, the road becomes East Baltimore Street and leaves the downtown, passing through residential areas. The route widens to a divided highway as it comes to an interchange with I-81 in a commercial area.

Past this interchange, PA 16 leaves Greencastle for Antrim Township and becomes Buchanan Trail East, passing more businesses and briefly becoming a three-lane road with a center left-turn lane before becoming a two-lane undivided road again. The road runs through farmland with some homes, passing to the south of a large industrial complex and passing through the residential community of Shady Grove. The route runs east-southeast through more rural land and passes under CSX's Lurgan Subdivision railroad line before it heads to the south of the community of Waynecastle, at which point it enters Washington Township. PA 16 runs east past more farms and woods and passes through Zullinger, where it bends east-southeast and heads past residences and a few businesses. The road passes near farm fields before it enters the borough of Waynesboro and becomes West Main Street, where it is lined with homes. The route heads into the downtown area and comes to a junction with PA 316, where that route joins PA 16 for a block before turning to the south. PA 16 continues southeast past downtown businesses and comes to an intersection with PA 997 at the center of town. Here, PA 997 becomes concurrent with PA 16 on East Main Street, and the two routes leave the downtown area, passing more homes and businesses. PA 997 splits to the southwest and PA 16 continues through commercial areas with a few residences, passing to the south of Waynesboro Hospital. The road becomes the border between Washington Township to the northeast and Waynesboro to the southwest, passing southwest of the residential community of Eastland Hills. The route fully enters Washington Township and curves east-southeast, passing businesses with nearby residential areas in the community of Wayne Heights as a three-lane road with a center left-turn lane. PA 16 becomes two-lane Buchanan Trail East and passes near a few farm fields before continuing past more residential and commercial development, curving east and passing north of the community of Rouzerville.

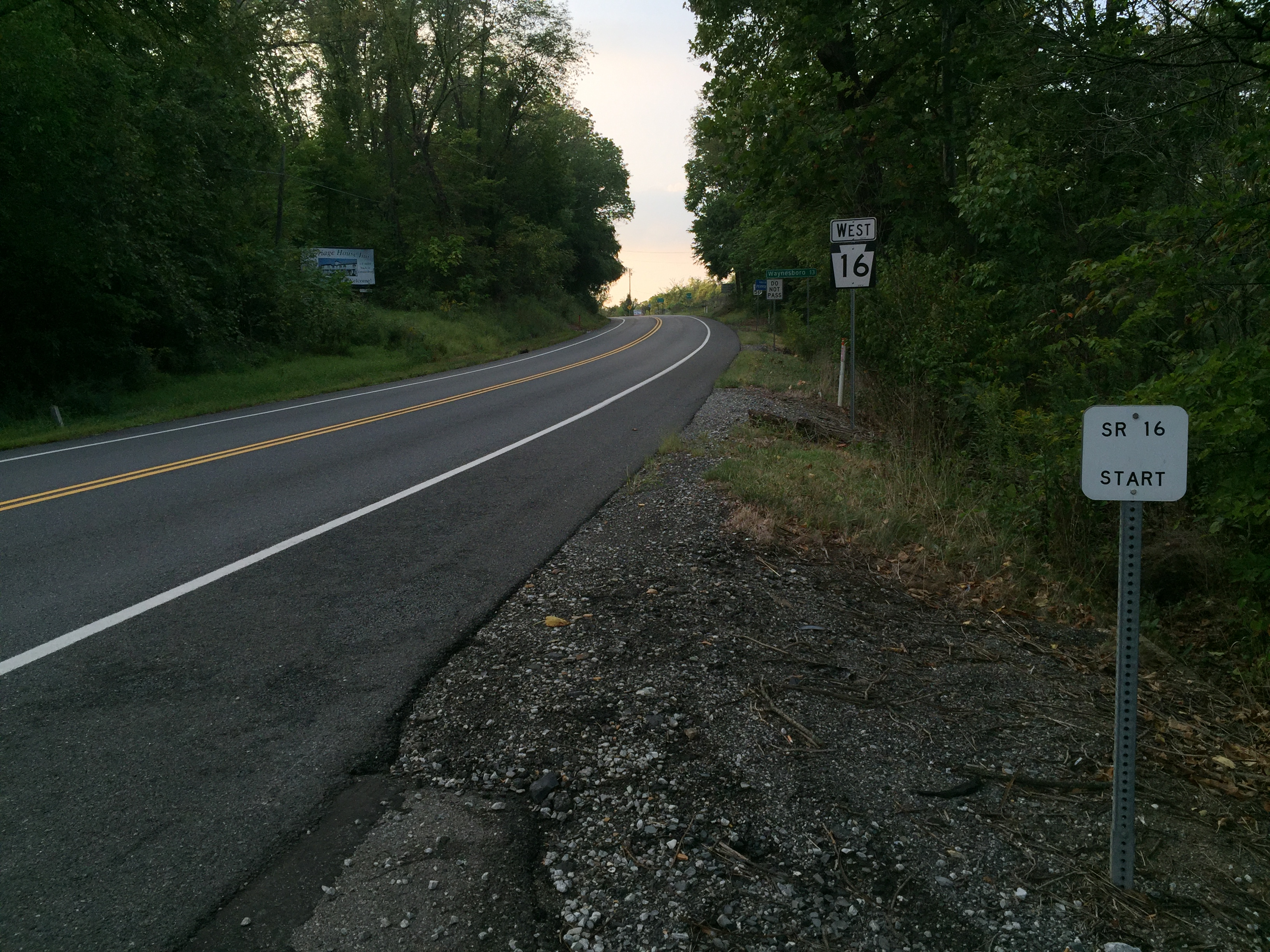
PA 16 westbound past its eastern terminus at MD 140 at the Maryland border in Liberty Township

The road leaves the Cumberland Valley and heads into forested areas in the South Mountain range, curving northeast and gaining a second eastbound lane. The route continues to ascend the mountain and gains a center left-turn lane before turning to the east, passing near the community of Beartown. PA 16 bends to the east-southwest and loses the center turn lane, continuing as a three-lane road with two eastbound lanes and one westbound lane and passing to the south of Michaux State Forest. Along this stretch, the route crosses the Appalachian Trail. The road bends to the southeast and becomes a two-lane road, passing through woods and fields. The route runs past a few businesses and curves to the east, crossing CSX's Hanover Subdivision railroad line at-grade to the north of Blue Ridge Summit. PA 16 heads into forests and curves northeast. The road heads into Liberty Township in Adams County and becomes Waynesboro Pike, turning east and crossing into Hamiltonban Township. The route runs through more wooded areas with some development and passes through the community of Fountain Dale, heading north of the Raven Rock Mountain Complex. PA 16 crosses back into Liberty Township and continues through forested areas with residential development as it skirts the southern border of the borough of Carroll Valley in three locations. The road fully enters Carroll Valley and comes to an intersection with the western terminus of PA 116. From here, the route turns to the southeast and runs through wooded areas with some homes and businesses, crossing back into Liberty Township and passing through the community of Liberty Mills. PA 16 reaches its eastern terminus at the Maryland border, where the road continues southeast into that state as MD 140.

== History ==
Pennsylvania Route 51
- Location: McConnellsburg – Carroll Valley
- Existed: 1927–1928

On September 21, 1820, a private turnpike the Emmitsburg and Waynesboro Turnpike was completed, connecting Waynesboro to Emmitsburg, Maryland. In 1837, the Mercersburg, Greencastle, and Waynesboro Turnpike was completed, connecting Mercersburg and Waynesboro via Greencastle. This turnpike served as part of a route between Pittsburgh and Baltimore. When routes were legislated in Pennsylvania in 1911, present-day PA 16 was designated as Legislative Route 224 between McConnellsburg and Waynesboro and as part of Legislative Route 44 between Waynesboro and Carroll Valley. In 1913, the section of current PA 16 in McConnellsburg became part of the Lincoln Highway, an auto trail that ran from San Francisco to New York City. In 1917, the state took over the road between McConnellsburg and the Maryland border near Carroll Valley. This road was named the Buchanan Highway (also known as the Buchanan Trail) in honor of 15th President James Buchanan, who was born near the road in Cove Gap. The Buchanan Highway ran between Mount Union and the Maryland border near Carroll Valley, heading south to McConnellsburg before continuing east to the Maryland border. The Lincoln Highway within Pennsylvania was designated as PA 1 in 1924. With the creation of the U.S. Highway System in 1926, US 30 was designated concurrent with PA 1 on the Lincoln Highway west of Philadelphia, including the section through McConnellsburg. The concurrent PA 1 designation was removed from US 30 in 1928. In 1927, the Buchanan Trail was designated as PA 44 between Mount Union and McConnellsburg and as PA 51 between McConnellsburg and the Maryland border near Carroll Valley.

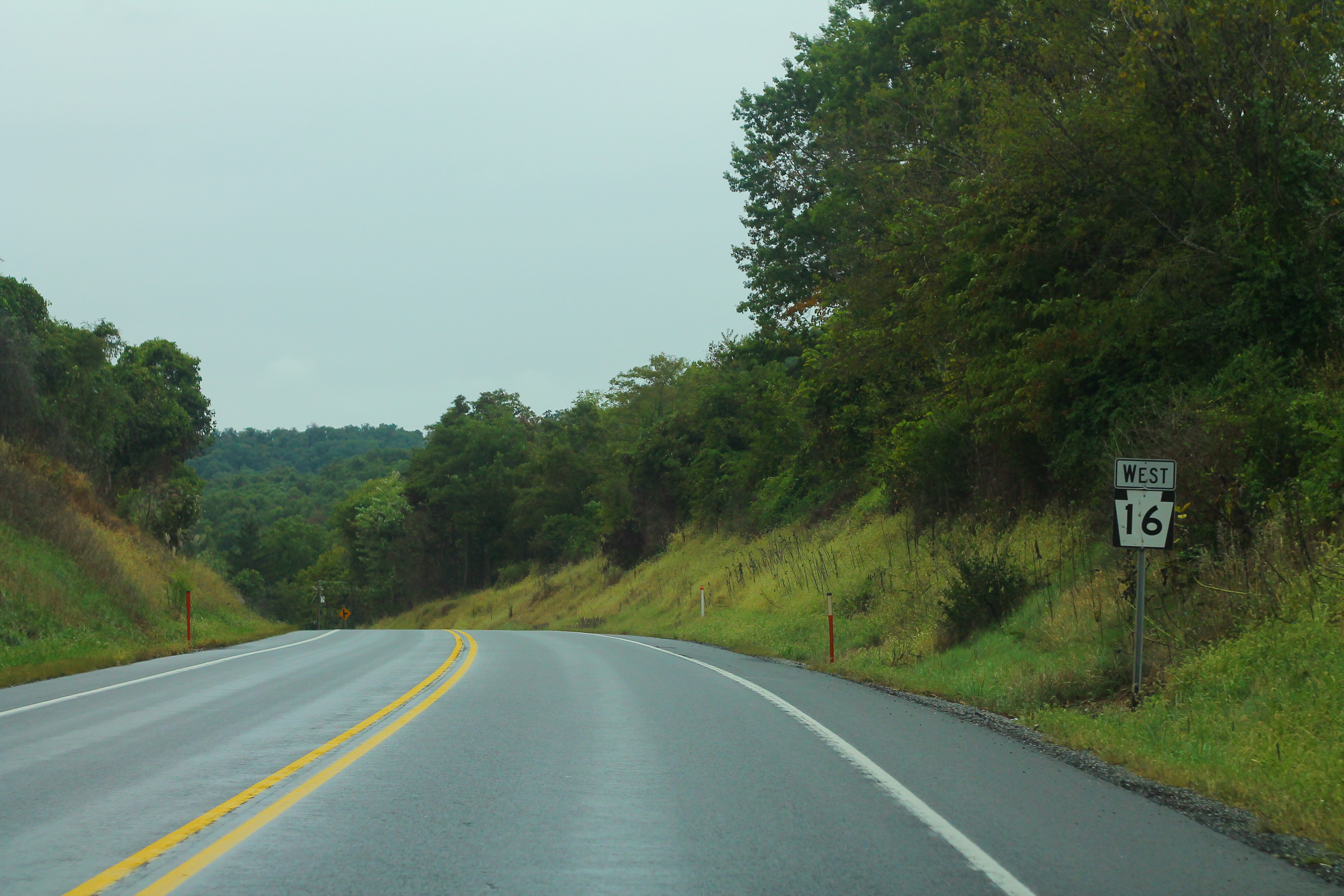
PA 16 westbound in Carroll Valley

PA 16 was designated in 1928 to run along the Buchanan Trail between US 30 (Lincoln Way) in McConnellsburg and MD 32 (now MD 140) at the Maryland border southeast of Carroll Valley, replacing the PA 51 designation; US 522 replaced the PA 44 designation between Mount Union and McConnellsburg. Upon designation, the entire length of PA 16 was paved. By 1941, PA 16 was realigned between Rouzerville and Fountain Dale, with the former alignment now known as Old Route 16, Charmian Road, and Old Waynesboro Road. In 1967, US 30 was rerouted along a bypass north of McConnellsburg, allowing PA 16 to be extended westward along Lincoln Way to its present terminus at US 522.

== Major intersections ==
County	Location	mi	km	Destinations	Notes
Fulton	McConnellsburg	0.000	0.000	US 522 (2nd Street) to US 30	Western terminus
Franklin	Peters Township	5.416	8.716	PA 456 south (Little Cove Road) – Sylvan, Indian Springs	Northern terminus of PA 456
Franklin	Mercersburg	9.942	16.000	PA 75 north / PA 416 north (Fort Loudon Road) – Fort Loudon, St. Thomas	West end of PA 75/416 concurrency
Franklin	Mercersburg	10.677	17.183	PA 75 south (Fort Loudon Road) – Shimpstown, Clay Lick, Kasiesville	East end of PA 75 concurrency
Franklin	Montgomery Township	12.710	20.455	PA 416 south (Mercersburg Road) – Welsh Run	East end of 416 concurrency
Franklin	Montgomery Township	15.507	24.956	PA 995 south (Welsh Run Road) – Welsh Run	West end of PA 995 concurrency
Franklin	Peters Township	16.159	26.005	PA 995 north (Warm Spring Road) – Williamson, Lemasters	East end of PA 995 concurrency
Franklin	Greencastle	20.455	32.919	US 11 (Antrim Way) – Chambersburg, Hagerstown	
Franklin	Greencastle	21.459– 21.473	34.535– 34.557	I-81 – Chambersburg, Hagerstown	Exit 5 (I-81)
Franklin	Waynesboro	28.798	46.346	PA 316 north (Grant Street)	West end of PA 316 concurrency
Franklin	Waynesboro	28.910	46.526	PA 316 south (Potomac Street) – Hagerstown, MD	East end of PA 316 concurrency
Franklin	Waynesboro	29.067	46.779	PA 997 north (Church Street)	West end of PA 997 concurrency
Franklin	Waynesboro	29.387	47.294	PA 997 south (Clayton Avenue) – Ringgold	East end of PA 997 concurrency
Adams	Carroll Valley	41.577	66.912	PA 116 east (Fairfield Road) – Carroll Valley, Fairfield, Gettysburg	Western terminus of PA 116
Adams	Liberty Township	43.146	69.437	MD 140 east (Waynesboro Road) – Baltimore	Maryland state line; eastern terminus
1.000 mi = 1.609 km; 1.000 km = 0.621 mi: Concurrency terminus
