= Irwinton Historic District =

- U.S. National Register of Historic Places
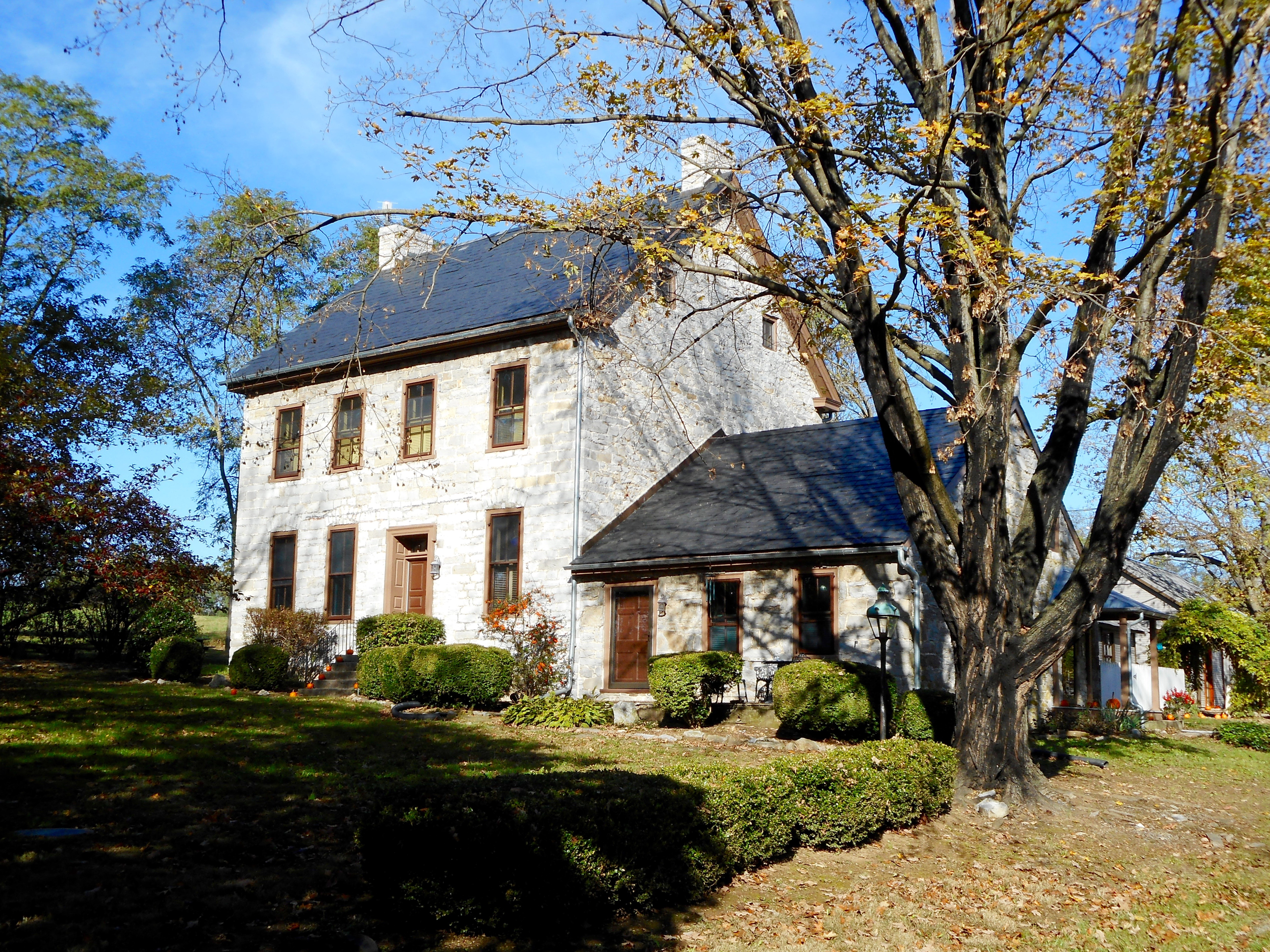
- Stone house Irwinton Mills, October 2017

- Location within Pennsylvania
- Location: 9717 & 9685 Anderson Rd., Montgomery Township, Pennsylvania
- Coordinates: 39°47′22″N 77°50′56″W
- Area: 26 acres (11 ha)
- Built: 1778-ca. 1915
- Architectural style: Georgian, Greek Revival
- NRHP reference No.: 12001096
- Added to NRHP: December 26, 2012

The Irwinton Historic District is a national historic district which is located near Upton in Montgomery Township, Franklin County, Pennsylvania.

It was listed on the National Register of Historic Places in 2012.

== History and architectural features ==
This historic district includes fifteen contributing buildings and three contributing structures, which are associated with eighteenth and nineteenth century mill and farmstead.

The district includes a ca. 1778 stone Georgian-vernacular house with extraordinarily high style interior woodwork; an 1856 frame flour mill; a frame miller's house; hog barn; and log and frame secondary dwelling, all dating from the mid-nineteenth century; log smoke house, frame stable; ca. 1850 frame Pennsylvania bank barn; wagon shed/corn crib also mid-nineteenth century, frame hog barn associated with the barn and three early-twentieth century buildings, and a car shed, summer kitchen and smoke house associated with the stone house. Finally, the district includes the milldam.
