= Pennsylvania Route 75 =

State highway in Pennsylvania, US

Pennsylvania Route 75

Route information
- Maintained by PennDOT
- Length: 71.249 mi (114.664 km)

Major junctions
- South end: MD 494 in Montgomery Township
- PA 995 in Claylick; PA 16 in Mercersburg; PA 416 near Mercersburg; US 30 in Fort Loudon; I-76 / Penna Turnpike in Willow Hill; PA 641 in Spring Run; PA 274 near Doylesburg; PA 850 in Honey Grove; PA 74 near Spruce Hill; PA 333 in Port Royal
- North end: US 22 / US 322 in Port Royal

Location
- Country: United States
- State: Pennsylvania
- Counties: Franklin, Juniata

Highway system
- Pennsylvania State Route System; Interstate; US; State; Scenic; Legislative
← PA 74	→ I-76

Pennsylvania Route 75 (PA 75) is a 71.2-mile-long (114.6 km) north–south state highway located in central Pennsylvania. The southern terminus is at the Mason–Dixon line in Montgomery Township, where the road continues into Maryland as Maryland Route 494 (MD 494). The northern terminus is at an interchange with U.S. Route 22 (US 22) and US 322 northeast of Port Royal. PA 75 is a two-lane undivided road that passes through the Ridge-and-Valley Appalachians in Franklin and Juniata counties. The route heads north from the Maryland border in Franklin County to Mercersburg, where it runs concurrent with PA 16 and PA 416. From Mercersburg, PA 75 heads north and crosses US 30 in Fort Loudon before it runs northeast through a long valley, where it has an interchange with the Pennsylvania Turnpike (Interstate 76 or I-76) in Willow Hill. The route turns north and heads into Juniata County, where it continues through another valley. PA 75 passes through Port Royal and crosses the Juniata River before it comes to its terminus at US 22/US 322.

PA 75 was designated in 1928 to run from US 30 in Fort Loudon north to US 22 (William Penn Highway) northeast of Port Royal. In 1937, PA 75 was extended south from Fort Loudon to the Maryland border. The route was realigned to bypass Blairs Mills on a shorter alignment to the east in the 1930s. In the 1970s, PA 75 was extended north to the new US 22/US 322 freeway on a road that was widened into a divided highway by 1990.

== Route description ==
=== Franklin County ===
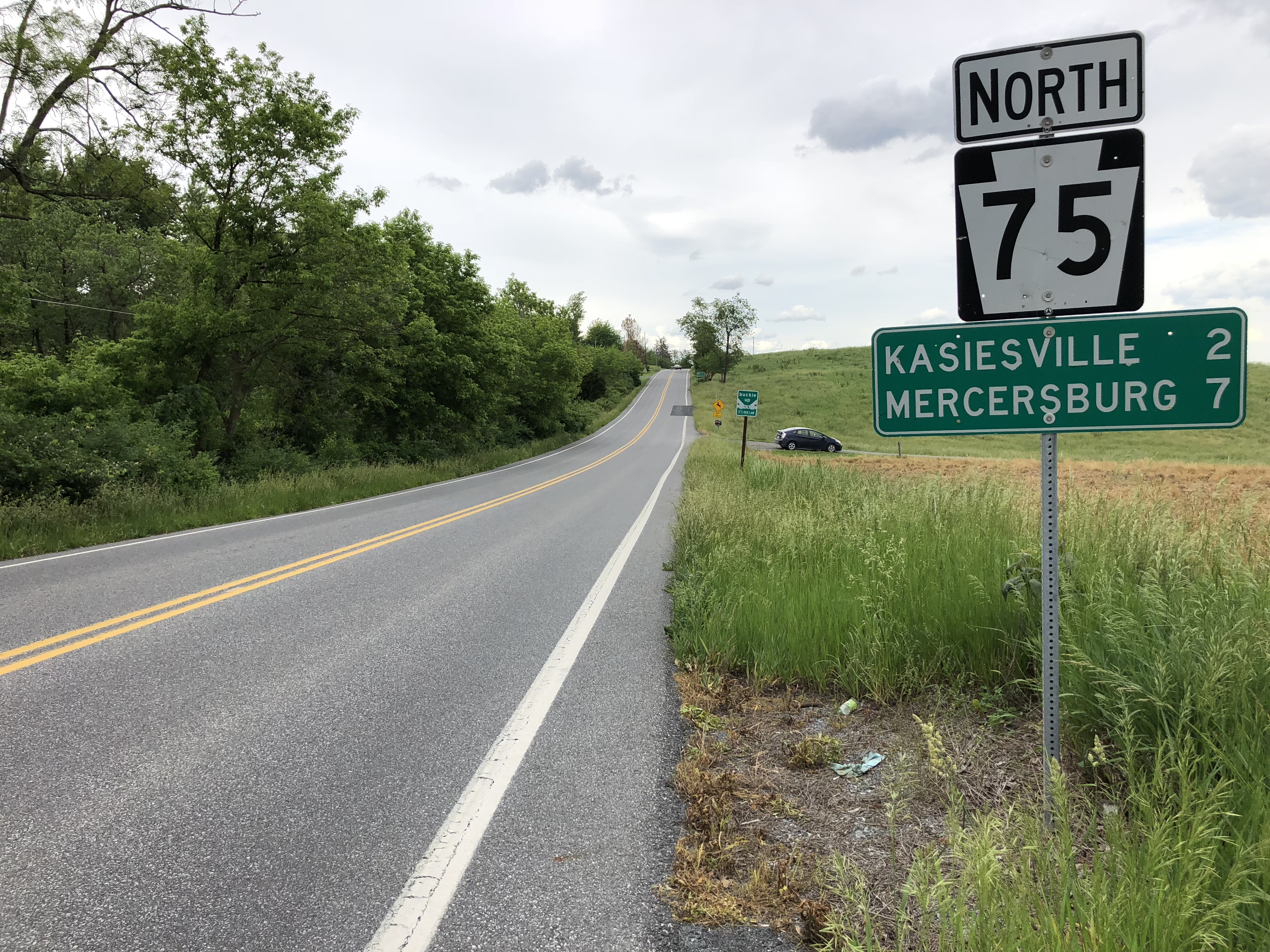
PA 75 northbound past its southern terminus at MD 494 at the Maryland border in Montgomery Township

PA 75 begins at the Maryland border in Montgomery Township, Franklin County, where the road continues south into that state as MD 494. From the state line, the route heads north on two-lane undivided Fort Loudon Road through open agricultural areas with occasional homes. The road passes through Kasiesville before coming to Claylick and intersecting PA 995. PA 75 runs through more farmland with some woods and residences, passing through Shimpstown. The road heads through more open agricultural areas prior to entering the borough of Mercersburg, where it passes homes. PA 75 comes to an intersection with PA 16/PA 416, where it turns northwest to form a concurrency with the two routes on Buchanan Trail West. The three routes turn north onto Main Street and passes homes and businesses in the center of Mercersburg. In the northern part of town, PA 16 heads to the northwest with PA 75 and PA 416 continuing northeast on Fort Loudon Road. The road passes a few residential and commercial areas before crossing into Peters Township and heading into agricultural surroundings. PA 416 splits from PA 75 by continuing northeast on Mercersburg Road. At this point, the route runs through more open farmland with some residences, passing through Dickey. The road turns northwest to run a short distance east of the West Branch Conococheague Creek before coming to an intersection with US 30 near Fort Loudon.

Here, PA 75 turns to the north and becomes Path Valley Road, passing through rural areas of homes. The route heads into forested areas with some homes between Tuscarora Mountain to the west and Kittatinny Mountain to the east, crossing into Metal Township. The road turns east for a short distance before heading north again, passing through Richmond Furnace. PA 75 runs through more forests before heading into a narrow agricultural valley with a few residences and curving to the northeast, heading through Metal. Farther to the northeast, the agricultural valley widens and the route runs through Fannettsburg and Springtown before coming to a ramp providing access to I-76 (Pennsylvania Turnpike) at the Willow Hill interchange. At this point, the road runs through more rural valley areas a short distance to the east of the Pennsylvania Turnpike, passing through Willow Hill prior to crossing under the Pennsylvania Turnpike. PA 75 runs through more open farmland and enters Fannett Township, coming to an intersection with PA 641 in the community of Spring Run. The route heads through more rural areas and passes through Dry Run. The road heads into a mix of farmland and woodland with some homes and turns north at Doylesburg, coming to a junction with the western terminus of PA 274. Past this intersection, PA 75 continues to the north and heads through Concord before heading into forested areas and crossing through a gap in Tuscarora Mountain.

=== Juniata County ===
PA 75 enters Lack Township in Juniata County and becomes an unnamed road, running through Spears Grove. The road turns northeast into valley farmland with some woods and homes, passing through Waterloo. At this point, the route begins to run to the southeast of the Tuscarora Creek, heading through more rural areas. PA 75 heads into a narrow agricultural valley with some woods and homes as it passes near Pearluck. Farther northeast, the road heads into Tuscarora Township and runs through the residential community of East Waterford before passing through more farmland. The route heads through an area of forests before heading back into agricultural areas and reaches PA 850 in Honey Grove, where the two routes briefly run concurrent across Laurel Run. The road continues between farmland to the northwest and forested Tuscarora Mountain to the southeast before turning north into open agricultural areas and heading into Spruce Hill Township. Here, PA 75 turns northeast again and runs through more rural areas, passing through Spruce Hill. The road briefly curves north before resuming northeast, heading between wooded areas to the northwest and agricultural areas to the southeast.

The route continues into Turbett Township and intersects the northern terminus of PA 74, heading through more farmland and woodland with some homes. PA 75 heads north-northeast as it comes to an intersection with PA 333 in Old Port. Here, PA 75 turns north to join PA 333 on Market Street, crossing the Tuscarora Creek into the borough of Port Royal, where PA 333 splits to the northwest. PA 75 turns to the northeast and passes several homes. The route comes to a bridge that carries it over Norfolk Southern's Pittsburgh Line, a portion of the town, and the Juniata River. After crossing the river, the road heads into Walker Township and turns northeast as an unnamed road into agricultural areas with occasional residences. PA 75 passes near a few commercial establishments and turns to the north-northeast. After crossing William Penn Highway (Old US 22), the route becomes a four-lane divided highway and runs through a mix of farmland and woodland, ending at an interchange with the US 22/US 322 freeway. The road continues north past this interchange as Industrial Park Road.

== History ==
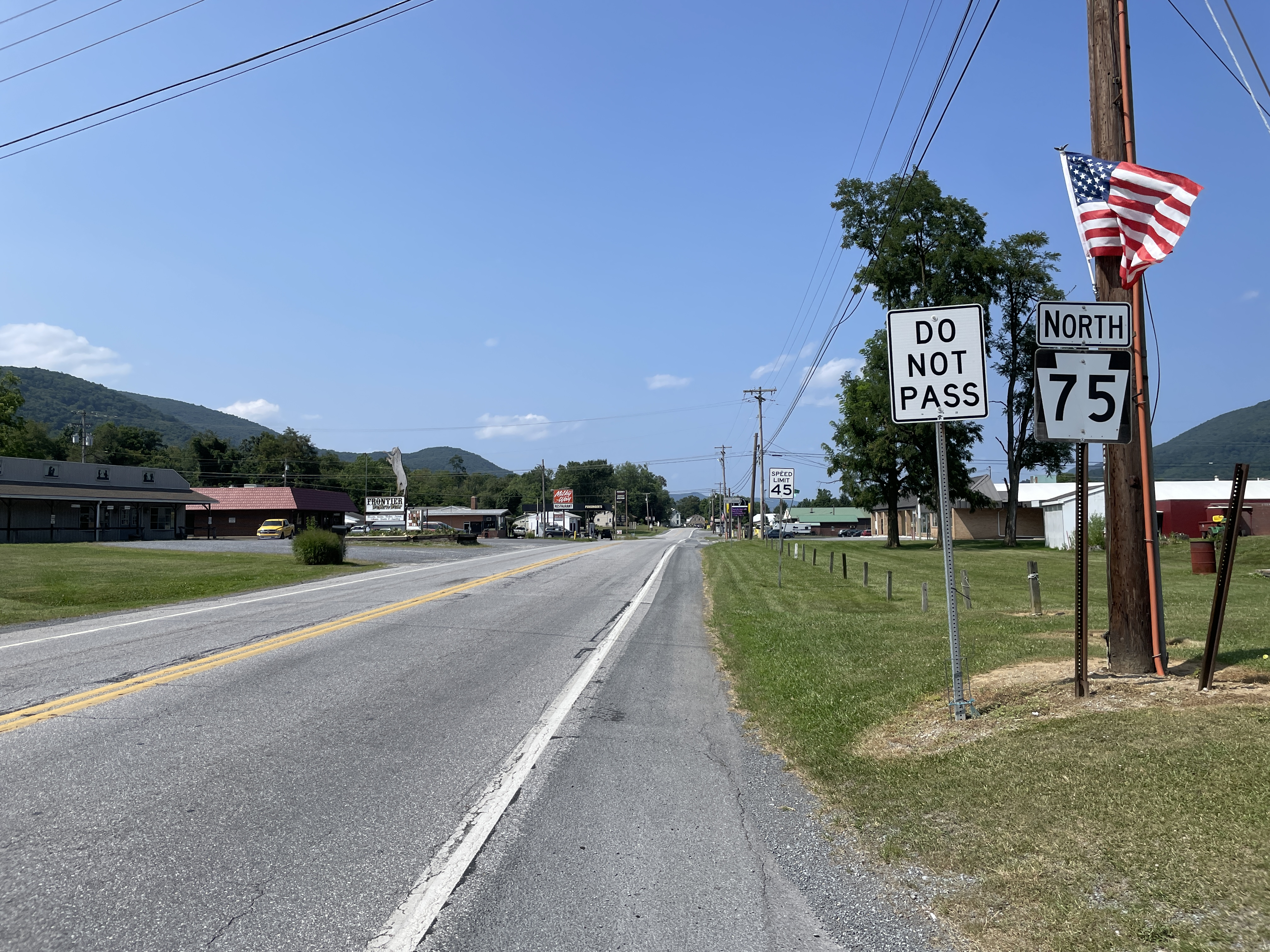
PA 75 northbound past US 30 in Fort Loudon

When routes were legislated in Pennsylvania in 1911, what is now PA 75 was designated as Legislative Route 45 between Fort Loudon and Port Royal. PA 75 was designated in 1928 to run from US 30 in Fort Loudon north to US 22 (William Penn Highway) northeast of Port Royal. Upon designation, the route was paved between north of Richmond Furnace and PA 35 in Blairs Mills and between southwest of Port Royal and US 22 while the remainder was unpaved. By 1930, the route was paved south from Richmond Furnace to US 30 while the section between Pleasant View and southwest of Port Royal was under construction. In 1937, PA 75 was extended south from Fort Loudon to the Maryland border south of Mercersburg. In the 1930s, PA 75 was realigned to bypass Blairs Mills by way of a shorter alignment to the east, with the former alignment now Blairs Mills Road and Church Road. The entire length of the route was paved in the 1930s. In the 1970s, PA 75 was extended northeast from William Penn Highway to the new US 22/US 322 freeway. By 1990, the route was widened to a divided highway between William Penn Highway and US 22/US 322.

== Major intersections ==
County	Location	mi	km	Destinations	Notes
Franklin	Montgomery Township	0.000	0.000	MD 494 east (Fairview Road)	Maryland state line; southern terminus
Franklin	Montgomery Township	3.174	5.108	PA 995 north (Welsh Run Road) – Welsh Run	Southern terminus of PA 995
Franklin	Mercersburg	7.182	11.558	PA 16 east / PA 416 south (Buchanan Trail) – Greencastle	Southern end of PA 16/416 concurrency
Franklin	Mercersburg	7.916	12.740	PA 16 west (Buchanan Trail) – McConnellsburg	Northern end of PA 16 concurrency
Franklin	Peters Township	9.066	14.590	PA 416 north (Mercersburg Road) – St. Thomas	Northern end of PA 416 concurrency
Franklin	Peters Township	13.859	22.304	US 30 (Lincoln Way) – McConnellsburg, St. Thomas, Chambersburg, Letterkenny Army Depot	
Franklin	Metal Township	28.146	45.297	I-76 / Penna Turnpike – Pittsburgh, Harrisburg	I-76 / Penna Turnpike exit 189 (Willow Hill); E-ZPass or toll-by-plate
Franklin	Fannett Township	32.374	52.101	PA 641 (Spring Run Road)	
Franklin	Fannett Township	39.379	63.374	PA 274 east	Western terminus of PA 274
Juniata	Tuscarora Township	55.609	89.494	PA 850 east – Kistler	Southern end of PA 850 concurrency
Juniata	Tuscarora Township	55.412	89.177	PA 850 west – Reeds Gap	Northern end of PA 850 concurrency
Juniata	Turbett Township	66.411	106.878	PA 74 south (Tuscarora Mountain Road) – Ickesburg, Carlisle	Northern terminus of PA 74
Juniata	Port Royal	68.356	110.008	PA 333 east – Van Dyke, Thompsontown	Southern end of PA 333 concurrency
Juniata	Port Royal	68.614	110.424	PA 333 west (Licking Creek Road) – Mifflin	Northern end of PA 333 concurrency
Juniata	Walker Township	71.249	114.664	US 22 / US 322 – Lewistown, Harrisburg	Interchange; northern terminus
1.000 mi = 1.609 km; 1.000 km = 0.621 mi: Concurrency terminus; Electronic toll collection
