= Pennsylvania Route 995 =

State highway in Franklin County, Pennsylvania, US

Pennsylvania Route 995

Route information
- Maintained by PennDOT
- Length: 19.557 mi (31.474 km)

Major junctions
- South end: PA 75 near Mercersburg
- PA 416 in Welsh Run; PA 16 in Upton
- North end: US 30 near Chambersburg

Location
- Country: United States
- State: Pennsylvania
- Counties: Franklin

Highway system
- Pennsylvania State Route System; Interstate; US; State; Scenic; Legislative
← PA 994	→ PA 996

Pennsylvania Route 995 (PA 995) is a 19-mile-long (31 km) north–south state route in south central Pennsylvania. The southern terminus of the route is at PA 75 in Claylick. The northern terminus is at U.S. Route 30 (US 30) west of Chambersburg. The road carries the names Welsh Run Road, Lemar Road, and Warm Spring Road. PA 995 is a two-lane undivided road that runs southwest-northeast through farmland in southwestern Franklin County. The route crosses PA 416 in Welsh Run and forms a concurrency with PA 16 in Upton. PA 995 was designated in 1928 between Williamson and US 30 west of Chambersburg. The route was extended southwest to PA 75 in Claylick in 1937, with the road paved in the 1930s.

== Route description ==
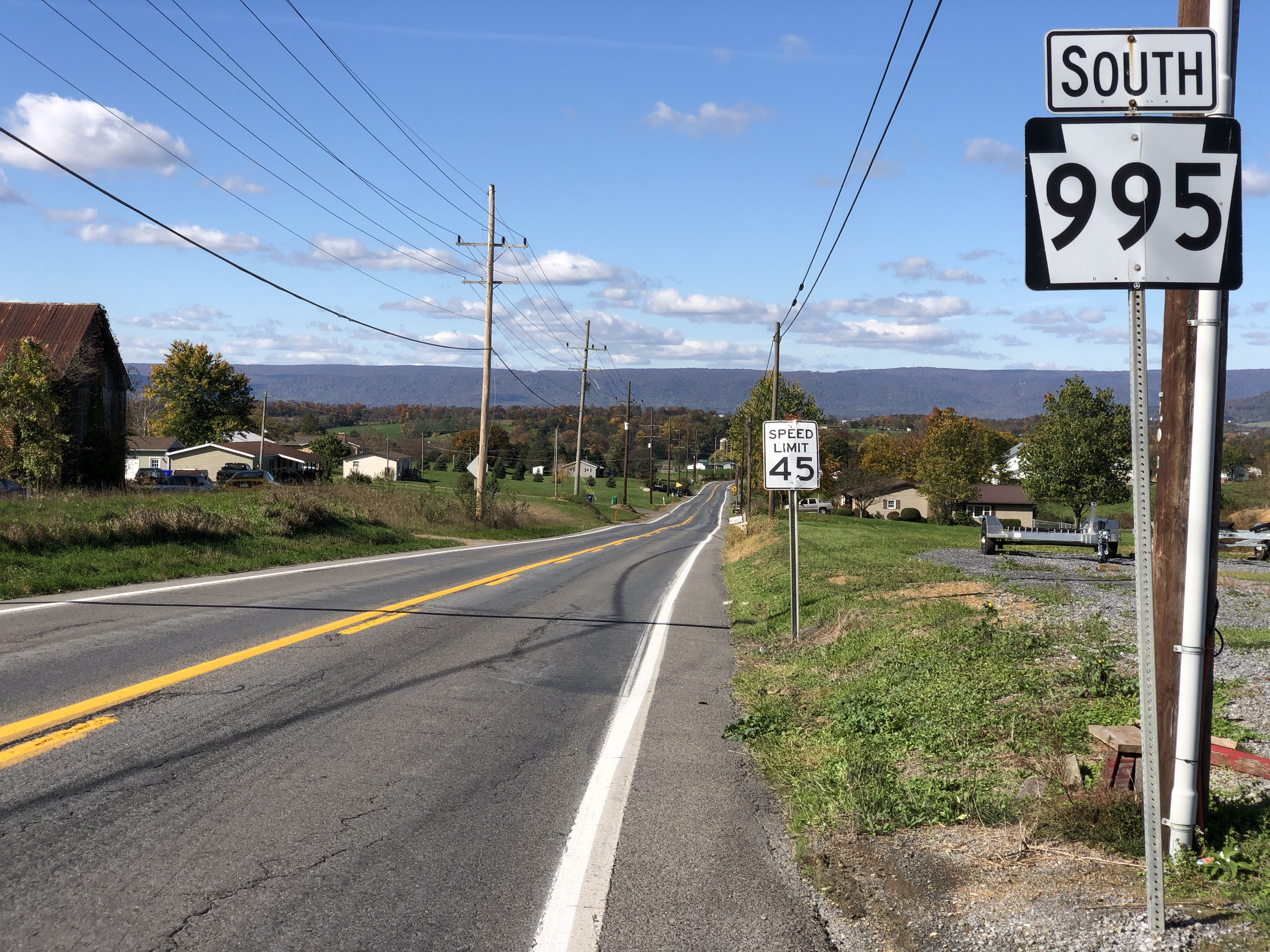
PA 995 southbound in St. Thomas Township

PA 995 begins at an intersection with PA 75 in the community of Claylick in Montgomery Township, heading east-southeast on two-lane undivided Welsh Run Road. The road heads into open farmland, making a turn to the northeast and crossing PA 416 in the community of Welsh Run. The route crosses the West Branch Conococheague Creek and continues through more agricultural areas, coming to a junction with PA 16. At this point, PA 995 turns east to form a concurrency with PA 16 on Buchanan Trail, crossing into Peters Township. In the residential community of Upton, PA 995 splits from PA 16 by turning northwest onto Lemar Road, heading through more farmland. The route turns north onto Warm Springs Road and passes more agricultural surroundings before heading into wooded areas.

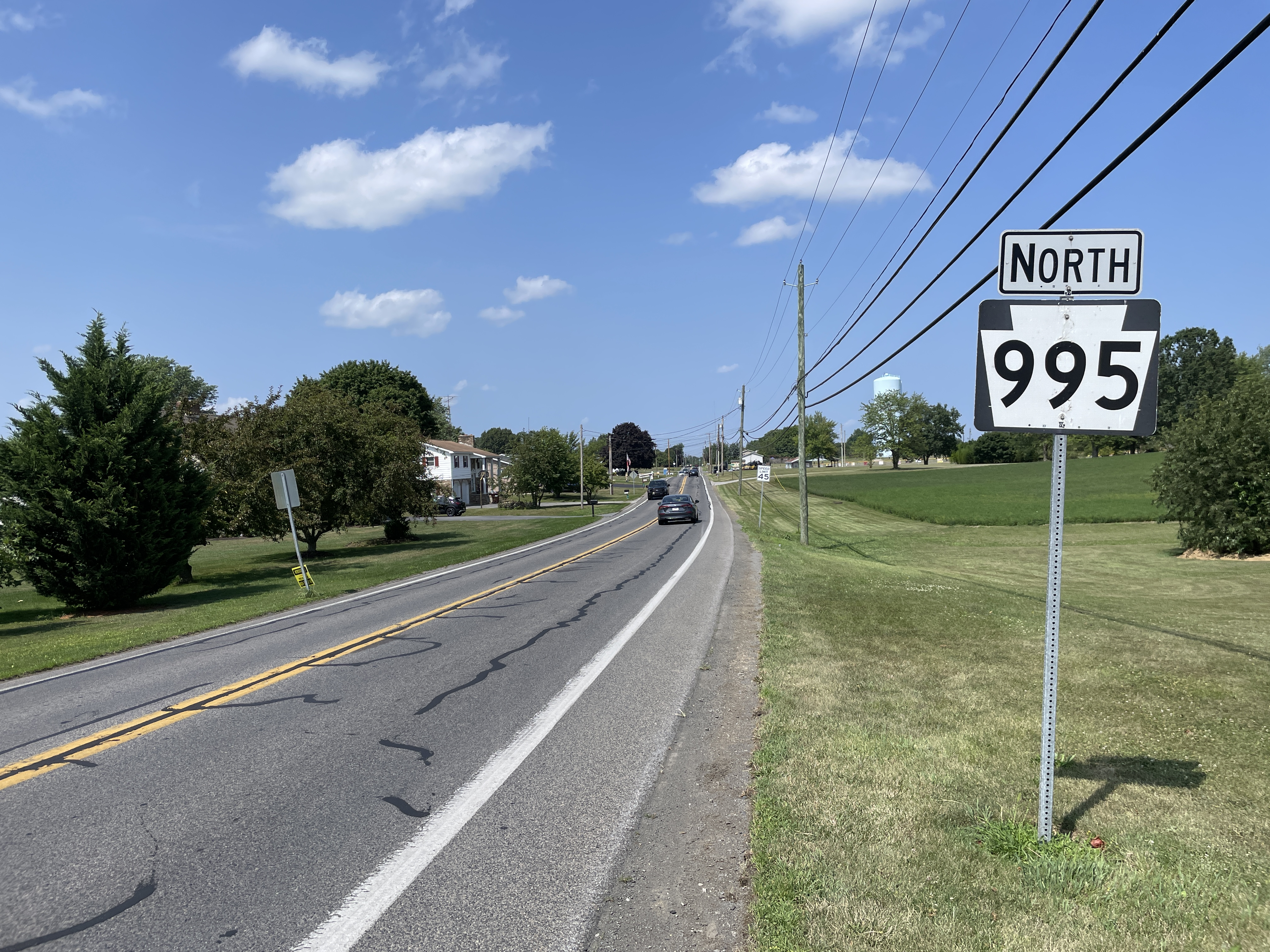
PA 995 northbound in Hamilton Township

The road enters St. Thomas Township and passes through the residential community of Williamson before turning northeast into farmland with some woods and homes. PA 995 crosses the Back Creek and continues east through more rural areas, crossing into Hamilton Township. The road turns northeast as it passes through Cashtown and Housum. The route continues through agricultural areas with some homes as it continues north through Turkeyfoot. Farther north, PA 995 enters increasing areas of rural residential development in the community of Sunbeam. The route passes more residential areas with some farms, passing through Pleasant View before ending at US 30.

== History ==
When routes were legislated in Pennsylvania in 1911, what is now PA 995 was not given a number. PA 995 was designated in 1928 to run from Williamson northeast to US 30 west of Chambersburg along an unpaved road. The road between PA 16 in Upton and Williamson was an unnumbered, unpaved road by 1930. In 1937, PA 995 was extended southwest from Williamson to PA 75 in Claylick, following its current alignment. The entire length of the route was paved in the 1930s.

== Major intersections ==
The entire route is in Franklin County.

Location	mi	km	Destinations	Notes
Montgomery Township	0.000	0.000	PA 75 (Fort Loudon Road) – Mercersburg	Southern terminus
Montgomery Township	2.621	4.218	PA 416 (Mercersburg Road) – Mercersburg, Hagerstown	
Montgomery Township	5.959	9.590	PA 16 west (Buchanan Trail West) – Mercersburg	South end of PA 16 overlap
Peters Township	6.614	10.644	PA 16 east (Buchanan Trail West) – Greencastle	North end of PA 16 overlap
Hamilton Township	19.557	31.474	US 30 (Lincoln Way West) – St. Thomas, Chambersburg	Northern terminus
1.000 mi = 1.609 km; 1.000 km = 0.621 mi
