= Millmont Farm =

Historic house in Pennsylvania, United States

- U.S. National Register of Historic Places
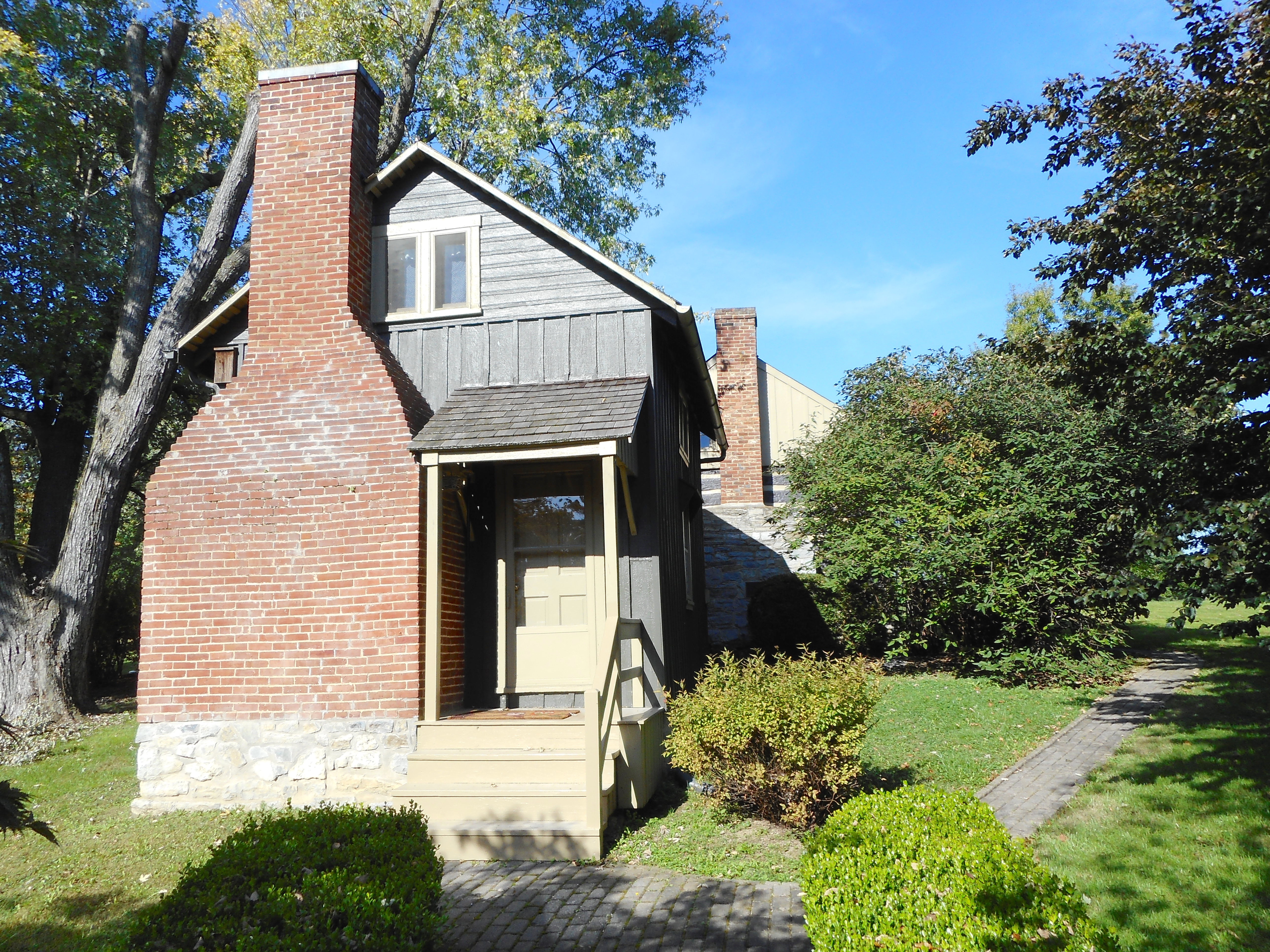

- Location within Pennsylvania Location within the United States
- Location: East of Mercersburg at the junction of Pennsylvania Routes 16 and 416, Montgomery Township, Pennsylvania
- Coordinates: 39°48′16″N 77°52′24″W
- Area: 28.7 acres (11.6 ha)
- Built: 1798–1821
- Architectural style: Georgian vernacular
- NRHP reference No.: 79002233
- Added to NRHP: April 27, 1979

The Millmont Farm is an historic home and farm complex that is located in Montgomery Township in Franklin County, Pennsylvania, United States.

It was listed on the National Register of Historic Places in 1979.

== History and architectural features ==
This property includes the main house, a double log house, a stone and frame secondary dwelling, a large frame bank barn, and the site of a grist mill. The main house was built between 1798 and 1821, and is a two-story, five-bay, stone dwelling with a 1 1/2-story rear wing. It has a vernacular, Georgian plan. The property was owned by James Ramsey, whose granddaughters were the sisters Jane Irwin Harrison (1805–1846), daughter-in-law of and White House hostess for U.S. President William Henry Harrison, and Elizabeth Ramsey Irwin Harrison (1810–1850), mother of U.S. President Benjamin Harrison.
