= Mansfield (Mercersburg, Pennsylvania) =

Historic house in Pennsylvania, United States

- U.S. National Register of Historic Places
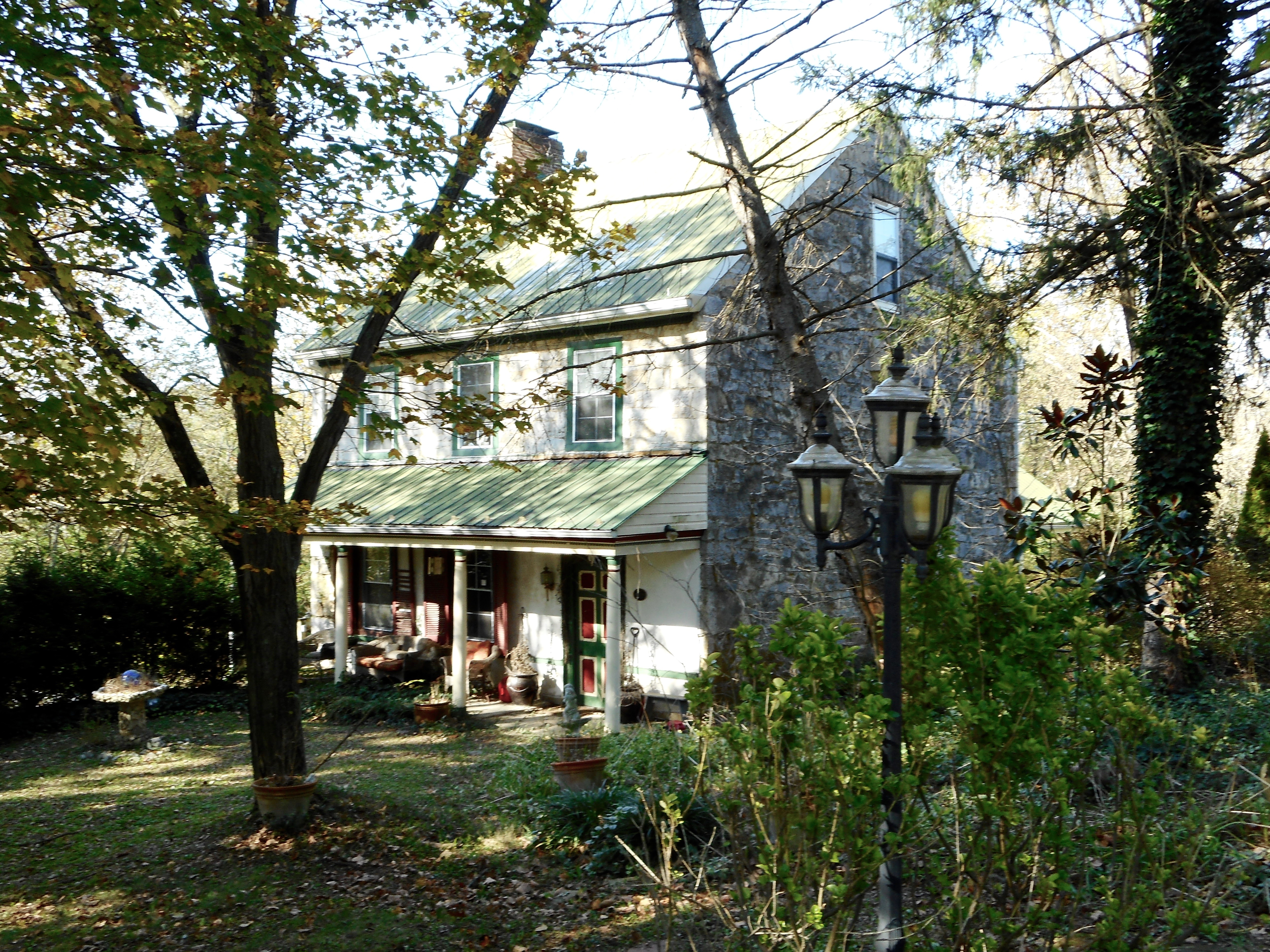

- Location within Pennsylvania Location within the United States
- Interactive map showing the location of Mansfield
- Location: Southeast of Mercersburg, Montgomery Township, Pennsylvania
- Coordinates: 39°47′34″N 77°51′44″W
- Area: 1.1 acres (0.45 ha)
- Built: c. 1807
- NRHP reference No.: 79002232
- Added to NRHP: April 26, 1979

Mansfield is a historic home located at Montgomery Township in Franklin County, Pennsylvania. It was built about 1807, and is a two-story, three bay stone dwelling with a one-story, four bay rear wing. It has a full-length, one-story, shed roofed front porch. The property once included a saw mill and woolen factory.

It was listed on the National Register of Historic Places in 1979.
