= Rock Hill Farm =

Historic house in Pennsylvania, United States

- U.S. National Register of Historic Places
- U.S. Historic district
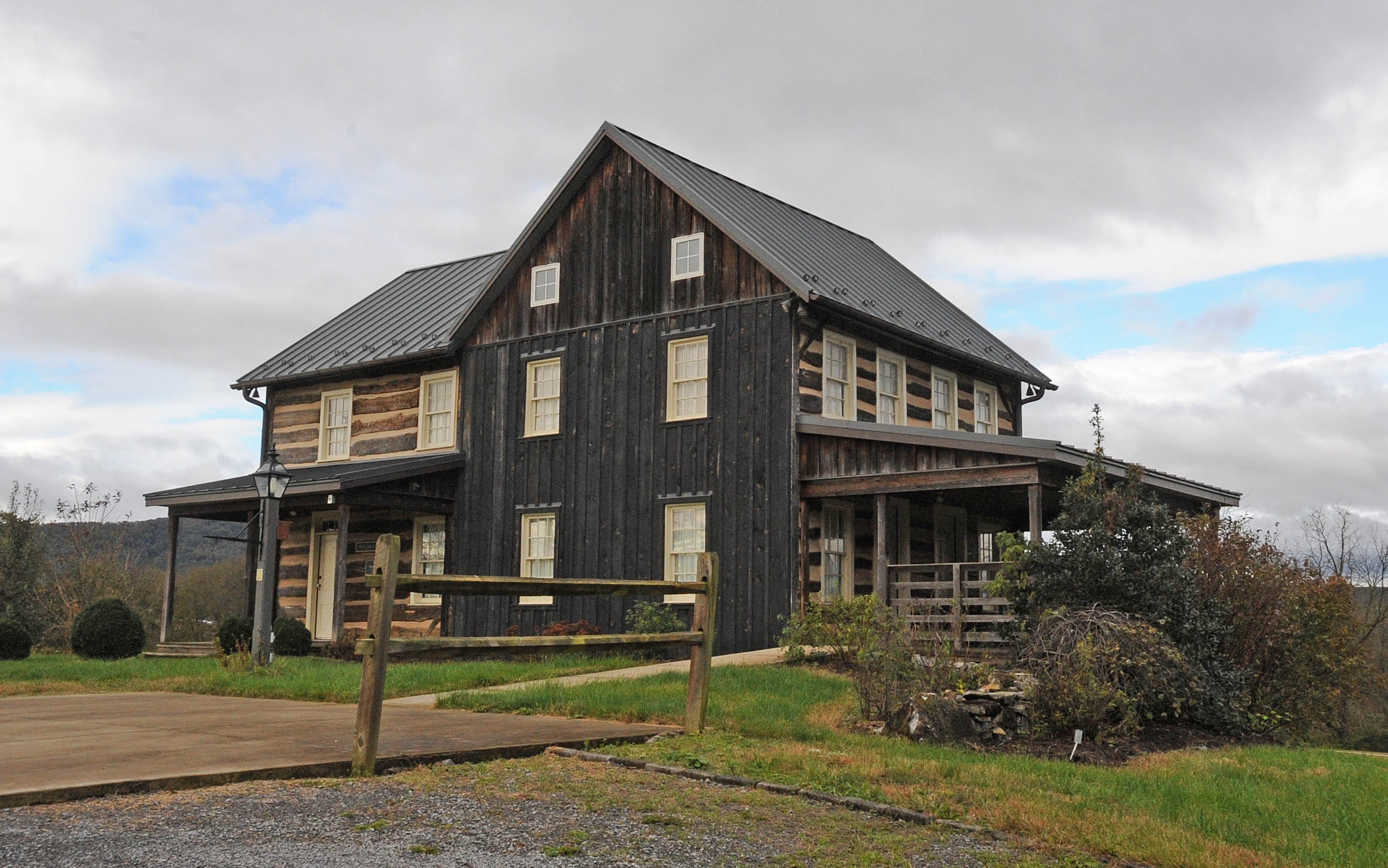
- Joseph Negley farmstead

- Location within Pennsylvania Location within the United States
- Interactive map showing the location of Rock Hill Farm
- Location: 12995 and 12755 Bain Rd., Montgomery Township, Pennsylvania
- Coordinates: 39°45′07″N 77°52′08″W
- Area: 149.9 acres (60.7 ha)
- Architectural style: Greek Revival
- NRHP reference No.: 99000880
- Added to NRHP: July 28, 1999

Rock Hill Farm, also known as the Davis-Stauffer Farm Complex, is an historic home and farm and national historic district located in Montgomery Township in Franklin County, Pennsylvania, United States.

It was listed on the National Register of Historic Places in 1999.

== History and architectural features ==
This district includes twelve contributing buildings, two contributing sites, and three contributing structures. They are associated with three areas: the Davis-Chamber farmstead (1793 and 1875), the Eliab Negley House (c. 1810), and the Joseph Negley farmstead (c. 1840). Contributing components of the Davis-Chamber farmstead include the log and frame main house (c. 1793), an eighteenth-century log smokehouse, a limestone milk house (c. 1810), a frame wash house (c. 1880), a frame outhouse (c. 1900), a frame wagon shed (c. 1900), and a frame barn with concrete silo (c. 1930). The property also has a stone wall (c. 1790–1820) and the archaeological remains of earlier buildings, including a limestone mill dismantled about 1930.

The Eliab Negley House is a log dwelling that was built between 1810 and 1823. The Joseph Negley farmstead includes a Greek Revival-style dwelling that was built between 1836 and 1850, with later modifications made circa 1900. Also located on the property are a contributing nineteenth century smokehouse, a frame wagon shed (c. 1900), and a large shed.

== Gallery ==
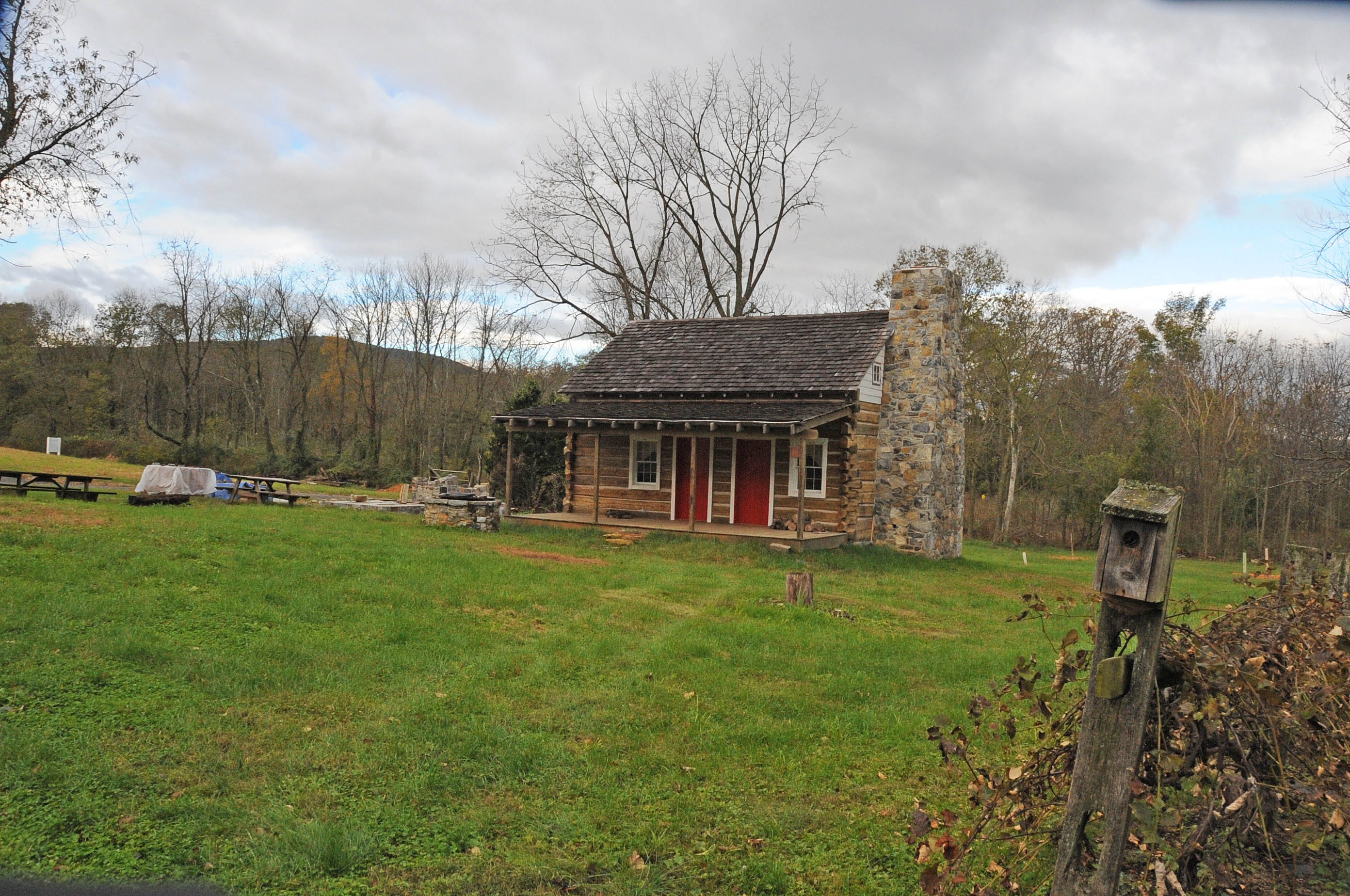

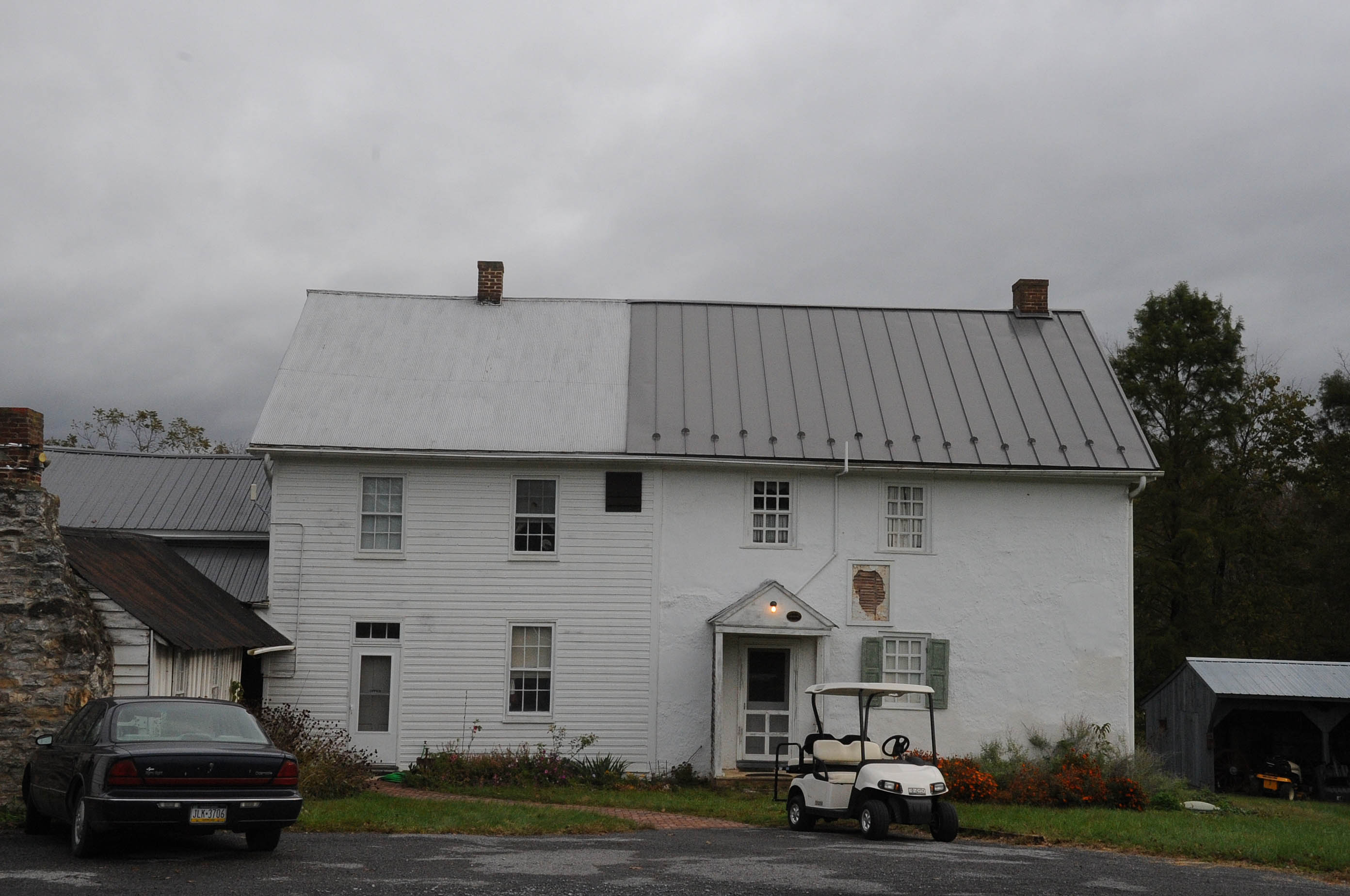
