= Hays Bridge Historic District =

Historic district in Pennsylvania, United States

- U.S. National Register of Historic Places
- U.S. Historic district
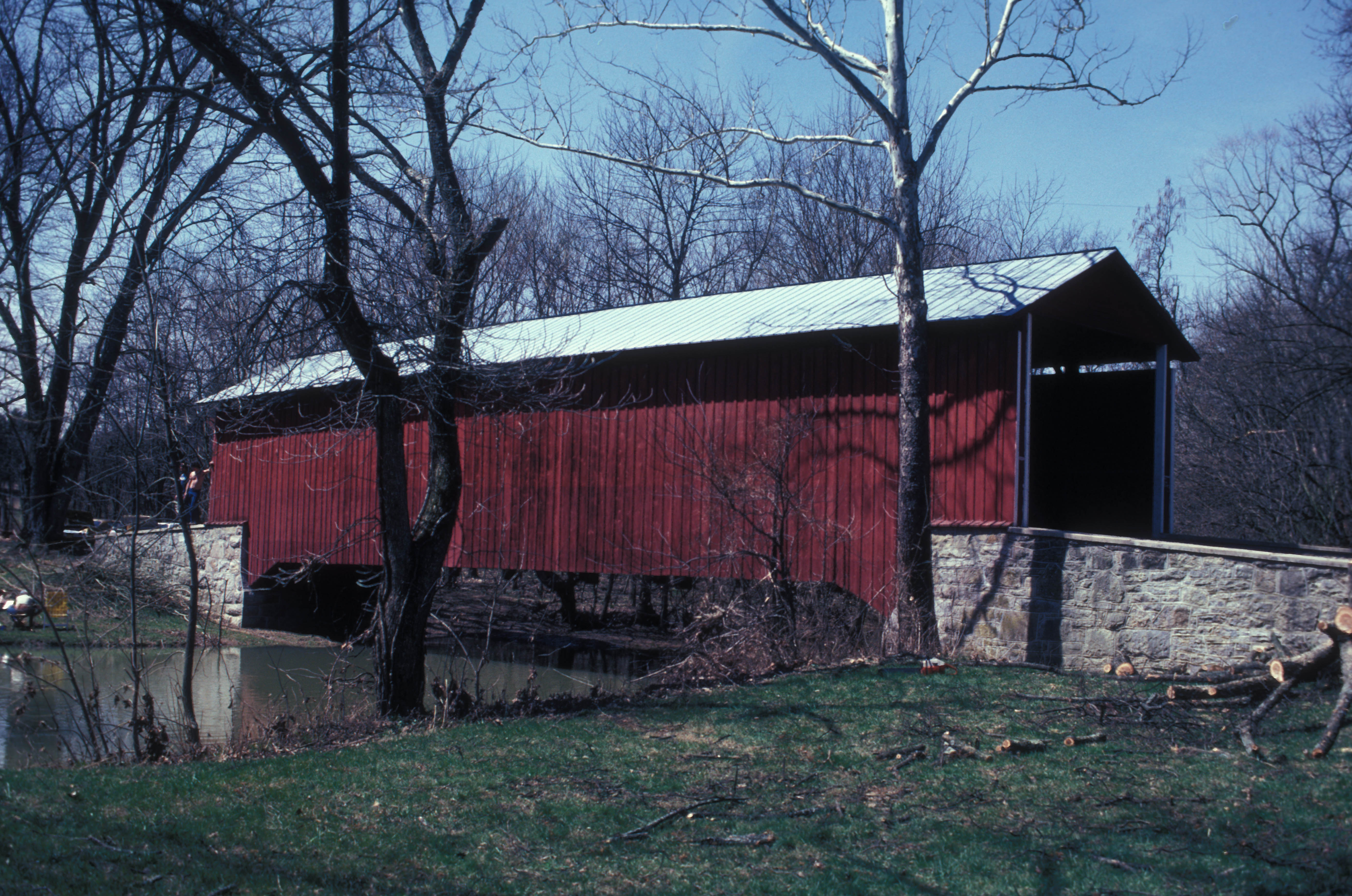
- Covered bridge in the district

- Location within Pennsylvania Location within the United States
- Location: East of Mercersburg on Pennsylvania Routes 331 and 328, Montgomery Township, Pennsylvania
- Coordinates: 39°47′19″N 77°51′15″W
- Area: 9.9 acres (4.0 ha)
- Built: 1820
- Built by: S. Stouffer
- Architectural style: Burr truss
- NRHP reference No.: 78002402
- Added to NRHP: July 31, 1978

The Hays Bridge Historic District is a national historic district which is located in Montgomery Township, Franklin County, Pennsylvania.

It was listed on the National Register of Historic Places in 1978.

== History and architectural features ==
The district includes two contributing buildings and two contributing structures. The buildings are a three-story, five-bay limestone house and bank barn, which date to the early-nineteenth century. The structures are an early nineteenth-century stone double arch bridge and a Burr Truss covered bridge which date to 1883. The covered bridge, known as Ped Bridge or Witherspoon Bridge, is eighty-seven feet long and fourteen feet wide, with a corrugated metal roof. It is the only remaining covered bridge in Franklin County.
