= Welsh Run, Pennsylvania =

Unincorporated community in Pennsylvania, US

- Unincorporated community
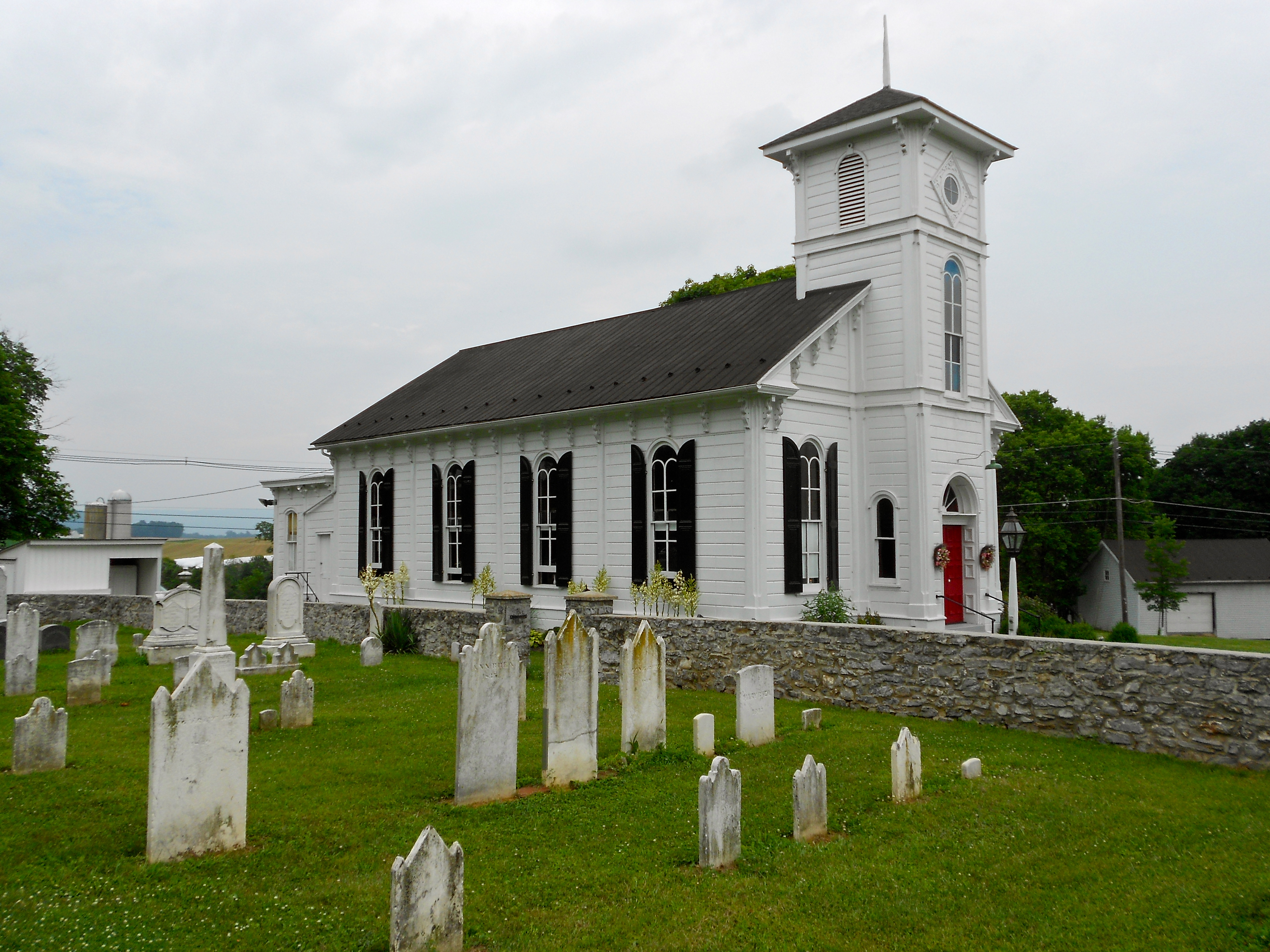
- Robert Kennedy Memorial Presbyterian Church

- Location within Pennsylvania Location within the United States
- Coordinates: 39°45′53″N 77°51′8″W
- Country: United States
- State: Pennsylvania
- County: Franklin
- Township: Montgomery
- Elevation: 515 ft (157 m)
- Time zone: UTC-5 (Eastern (EST))
  - Summer (DST): UTC-4 (EDT)
- ZIP code: 17225
- Area code: 717
- GNIS feature ID: 1190818

Welsh Run is an unincorporated community in Montgomery Township in Franklin County, Pennsylvania, United States. Welsh Run is located at the intersection of state routes 416 and 995, southeast of Mercersburg. A large share of the first settlers being natives of Wales caused the name to be selected.

A post office called Welsh Run was established in 1830, and remained in operation until 1906. In March 1863, Welsh Run "especially received a thorough scouring" by Confederate General Albert Jenkins and his unit of the 8th Virginia Cavalry as they plundered southern Franklin County.
