= Angle Farm =

Historic house in Pennsylvania, United States

- U.S. National Register of Historic Places
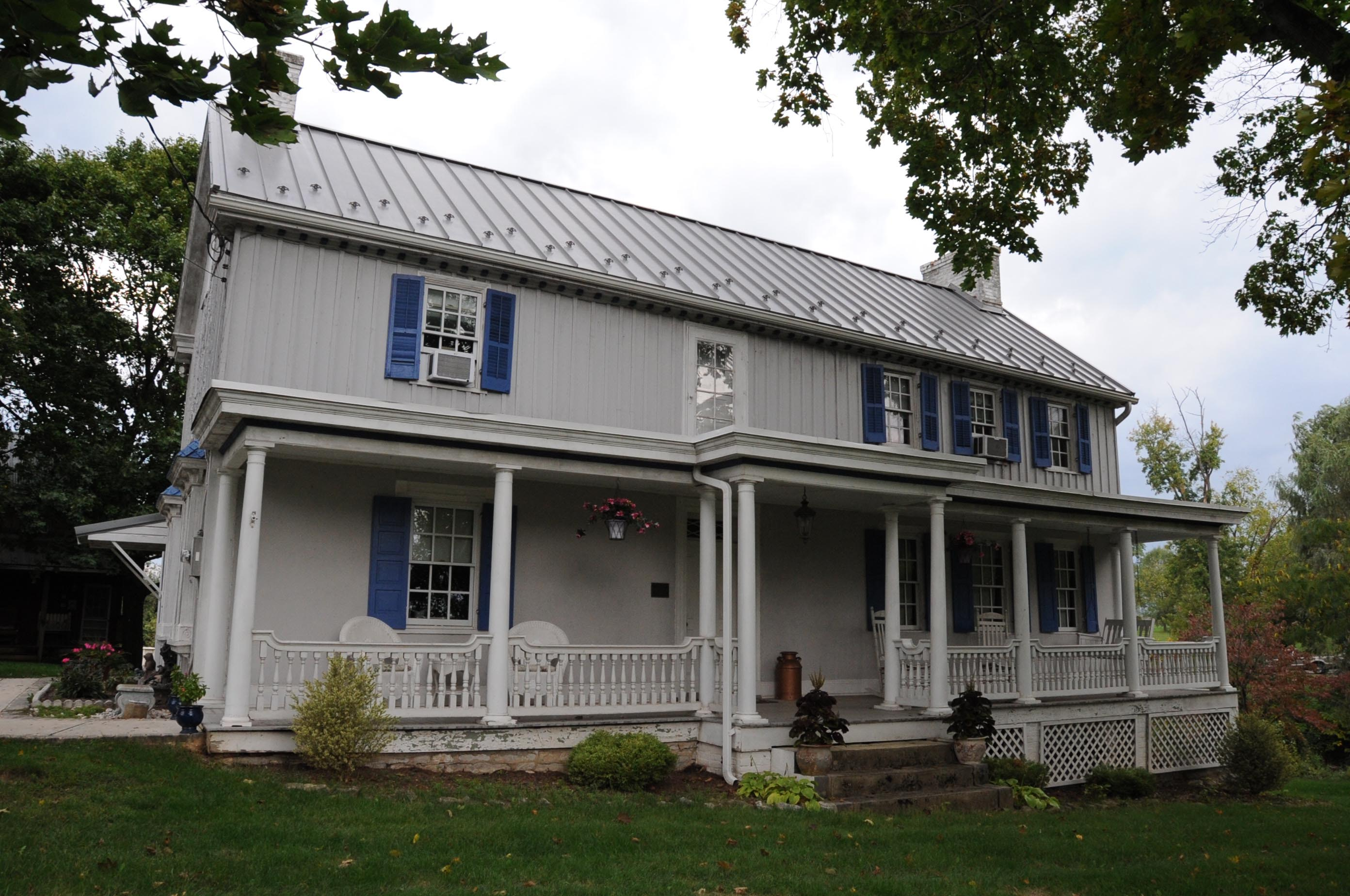

- Location within Pennsylvania Location within the United States
- Location: Southeast of Mercersburg, Montgomery Township, Pennsylvania
- Coordinates: 39°45′53″N 77°51′10″W
- Area: 1 acre (0.40 ha)
- Built: c. 1800-1815, c. 1850
- NRHP reference No.: 79002231
- Added to NRHP: November 20, 1979

The Angle Farm, also known as Maplebrow, is a historic home located southeast of Mercersburg in Montgomery Township, Franklin County, Pennsylvania. A three-part, two-story, five-bay log and timber frame dwelling, it is supported by a fieldstone foundation.

This property was listed on the National Register of Historic Places in 1979.

== History and architectural features ==
During the early 19th century, John Angle acquired property in Montgomery Township, Franklin County, Pennsylvania. Situated southeast of the community of Mercersburg, the property was subsequently improved by Angle and members of his family.

The original three-bay log section of this historic home was built roughly between 1800 and 1815; two additional bays were added during the 1850s. The home is sheathed in stucco and board-and-batten siding. A modern frame kitchen wing is attached to the rear. It has a one-story full length front porch, which was added during the 20th century, and a slate roof. Also located on the property are a contributing springhouse and frame stable.

Katherine H. Ritchey of Welsh Run in Chambersburg, Pennsylvania was the owner and occupant of the property at the time of announcements by newspapers in 1980 of the home's placement on the National Register.
