= Col. John Work House =

Historic house in Pennsylvania, United States

- U.S. National Register of Historic Places
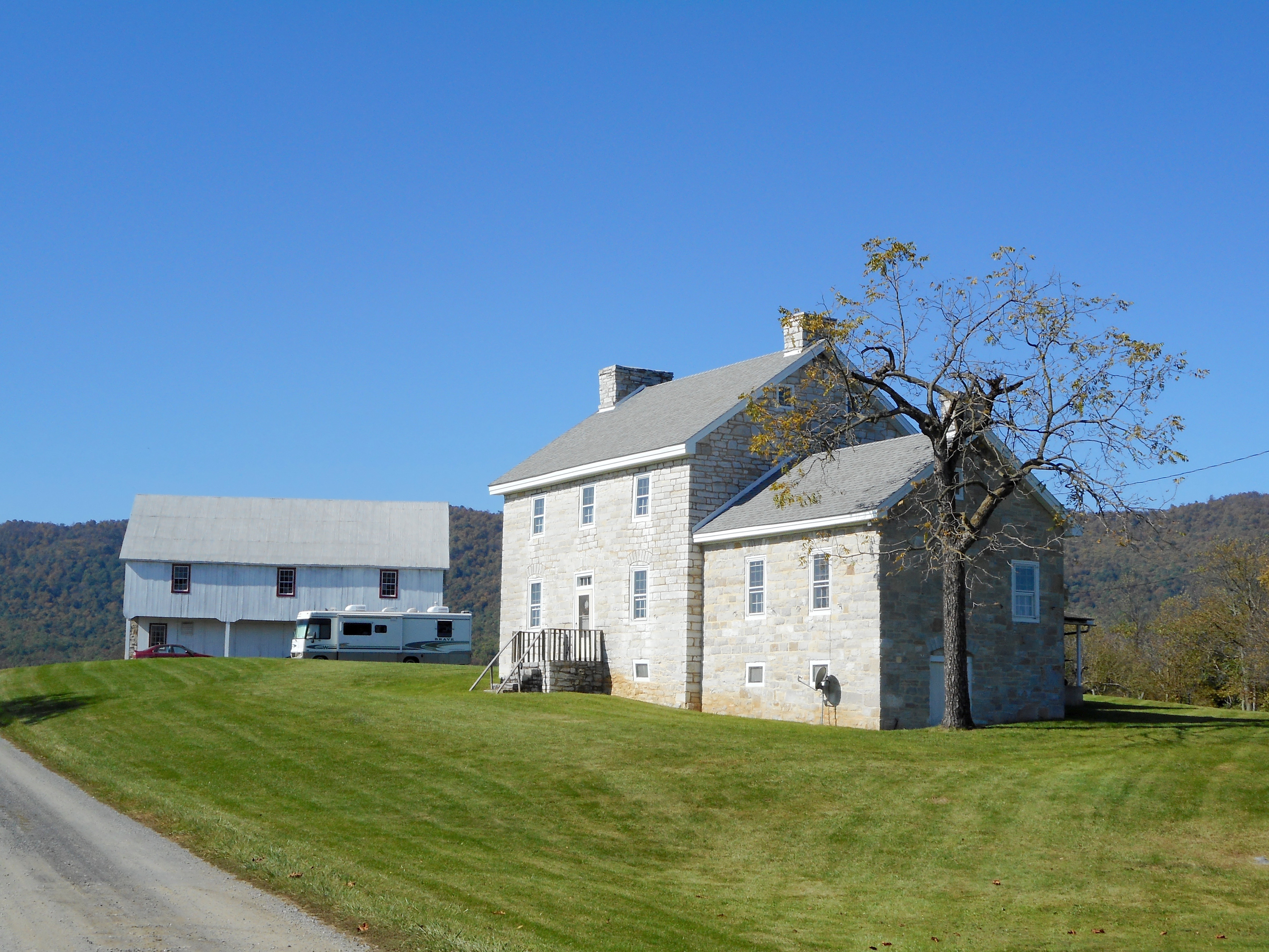
- The house in 2017

- Location within Pennsylvania Location within the United States
- Location: Southeast of Mercersburg, Montgomery Township, Pennsylvania
- Coordinates: 39°47′48″N 77°56′27″W
- Area: 3 acres (1.2 ha)
- Built: c. 1775
- NRHP reference No.: 79002234
- Added to NRHP: November 20, 1979

Col. John Work House is a historic home located at Montgomery Township in Franklin County, Pennsylvania, United States. It was built about 1775, and is a 2 1/2-story, three bay limestone dwelling with a moderately pitched gable roof. It represents the typical home of a prosperous late-18th century central Pennsylvania farmer.

It was listed on the National Register of Historic Places in 1979.
