= Shimpstown, Pennsylvania =

Unincorporated community in Pennsylvania, US

- Unincorporated community
- Location within Pennsylvania Location within the United States
- Coordinates: 39°47′25″N 77°53′59″W
- Country: United States
- State: Pennsylvania
- County: Franklin
- Township: Montgomery
- Elevation: 610 ft (190 m)
- Time zone: UTC-5 (Eastern (EST))
  - Summer (DST): UTC-4 (EDT)
- ZIP code: 17236
- Area code: 717
- GNIS feature ID: 1187525

Shimpstown is an unincorporated community in Montgomery Township in Franklin County, Pennsylvania, United States. Shimpstown is located on Pennsylvania Route 75, south of Mercersburg.
