= Claylick, Pennsylvania =

Unincorporated community in Pennsylvania, US

- Unincorporated community
- Location within Pennsylvania Location within the United States
- Coordinates: 39°46′0″N 77°53′37″W
- Country: United States
- State: Pennsylvania
- County: Franklin
- Township: Montgomery
- Elevation: 518 ft (158 m)
- Time zone: UTC-5 (Eastern (EST))
  - Summer (DST): UTC-4 (EDT)
- ZIP code: 17236
- Area code: 717
- GNIS feature ID: 1171950

Claylick is an unincorporated community in Montgomery Township in Franklin County, Pennsylvania, United States. Claylick is located at the intersection of state routes 75 and 995, south of Mercersburg.

Clay Lick was laid out circa 1831, and named after nearby Clay Lick Mountain. A post office called Clay Lick was established in 1862, the name was changed to Claylick in 1895, and the post office closed in 1905.
