= Fort Loudon, Pennsylvania =

Unincorporated community in Pennsylvania, US

- Census-designated place
- Location within Pennsylvania Location within the United States
- Coordinates: 39°55′19″N 77°54′26″W
- Country: United States
- State: Pennsylvania
- County: Franklin
- Township: Peters

Area
  - Total: 4.26 sq mi (11.03 km^{2})
  - Land: 4.26 sq mi (11.03 km^{2})
  - Water: 0 sq mi (0.00 km^{2})
- Elevation: 640 ft (200 m)

Population (2020)
  - Total: 895
  - Density: 210.1/sq mi (81.13/km^{2})
- Time zone: UTC-5 (Eastern (EST))
  - Summer (DST): UTC-4 (EDT)
- ZIP code: 17224
- FIPS code: 42-26824
- GNIS feature ID: 2633769

Fort Loudon is an unincorporated community and census-designated place (CDP) in Peters Township, Franklin County, Pennsylvania, United States. As of the 2020 census, the population was 895.

== History ==
The community is named after the colonial Fort Loudoun, built in 1756 during the French and Indian War. A replica of the fort, built in 1993, stands at the corner of US 30 and Brooklyn Road North, at the southeastern corner of the CDP.

A post office called Loudon was established in 1814, and the name was changed to Fort Loudon in 1883.

== Geography ==
Fort Loudon is located in western Franklin County in the valley of the West Branch Conococheague Creek, with Cove Mountain to the west, Blue Mountain to the north, and Parnell Knob to the east. U.S. Route 30, the Lincoln Highway, passes through the community, leading west 8 miles (13 km) to McConnellsburg and east 13 miles (21 km) to Chambersburg, the Franklin County seat. Pennsylvania Route 75 crosses US 30 southwest of the town center, leading north up the Path Valley to 12 miles (19 km) Fannettsburg and south 6 miles (10 km) to Mercersburg.

According to the U.S. Census Bureau, the Fort Loudon CDP has an area of 4.2 square miles (11.0 km^{2}), all land.

== Demographics ==
Historical population
Census	Pop.	Note	%±
2020	895		—
U.S. Decennial Census
