= Upton, Pennsylvania =

Unincorporated community in Pennsylvania, US

- Unincorporated community
- Location within Pennsylvania Location within the United States
- Coordinates: 39°48′19″N 77°48′24″W
- Country: United States
- State: Pennsylvania
- County: Franklin
- Township: Peters
- Elevation: 610 ft (190 m)
- Time zone: UTC-5 (Eastern (EST))
  - Summer (DST): UTC-4 (EDT)
- ZIP code: 17225
- Area code: 717
- GNIS feature ID: 1190266

Upton is an unincorporated community in Peters Township in Franklin County, Pennsylvania, United States. Upton is located at the intersection of state routes 16 and 995, east of Mercersburg and west of Greencastle.

Upton was laid out in 1840. A post office called Upton was established in 1837, and remained in operation until 1906.

== Notable people ==
- Henry C. Newcomer, U.S. Army brigadier general, born in Upton
