= Robert Kennedy Memorial Presbyterian Church =

Historic church in Pennsylvania, United States

- U.S. National Register of Historic Places
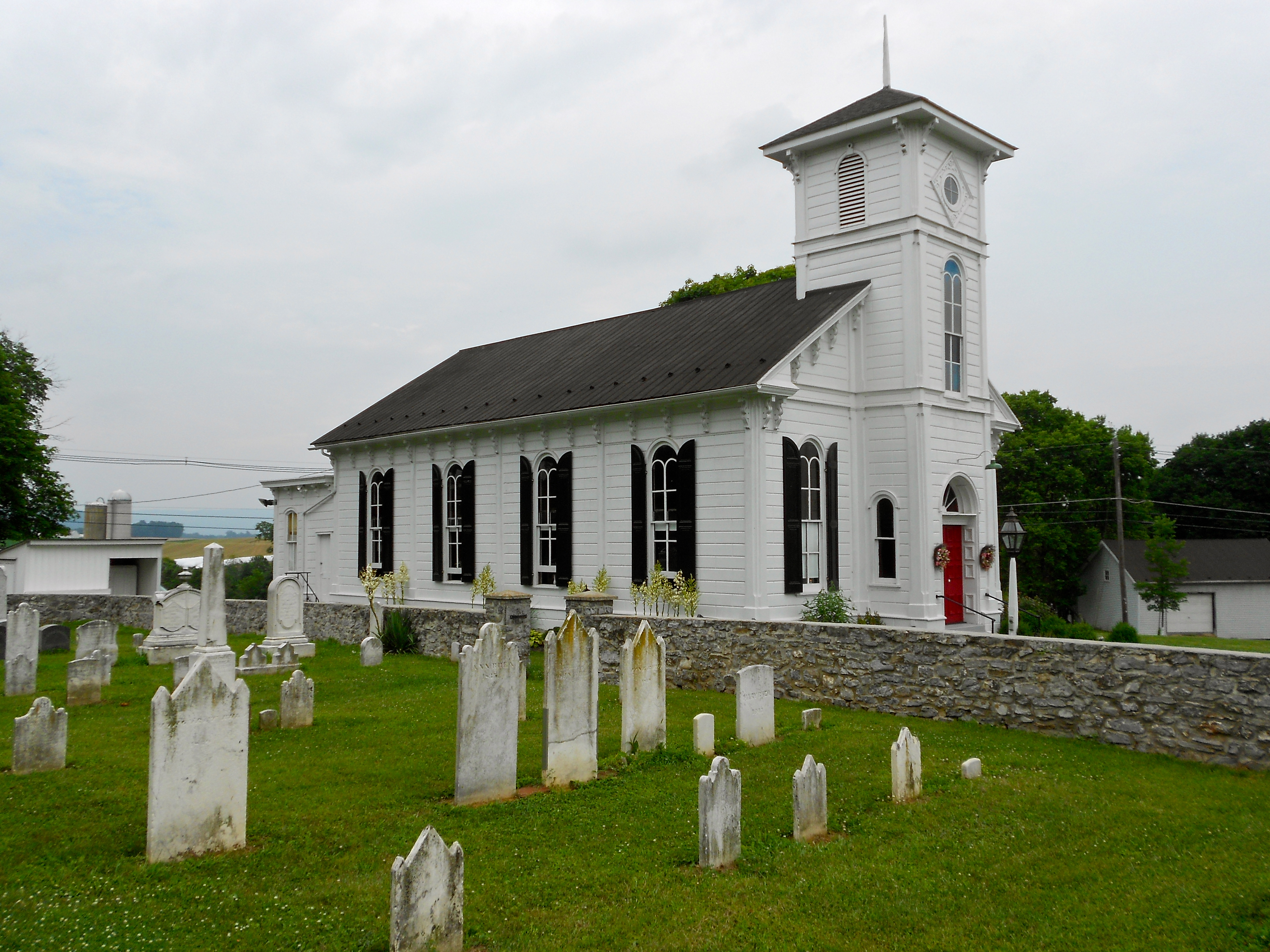

- Location within Pennsylvania Location within the United States
- Location: 11799 Mercersburg Rd., Montgomery Township, Pennsylvania
- Coordinates: 39°45′51″N 77°51′09″W
- Area: 1.7 acres (0.69 ha)
- Built: 1871
- Architectural style: Italianate
- NRHP reference No.: 09000385
- Added to NRHP: June 6, 2009

The Robert Kennedy Memorial Presbyterian Church, also known as the Welsh Run Presbyterian Church, is an historic Presbyterian church in Montgomery Township, Franklin County, Pennsylvania, United States.

It was added to the National Register of Historic Places in 2009.

== History and architectural features ==
Built in 1871, this historic structure is a 1 1/2-story, frame, Italianate-style building that is three bays wide and four bays long and has a central bell tower and gable roof. It features a stained glass window that was created by the Tiffany Studio in New York in 1934. The property includes the church cemetery, which was established in 1774. The church is named for the Rev. Robert Kennedy, who served the congregation from 1802 to 1816 and from 1825 to 1843.
