= Kasiesville, Pennsylvania =

Unincorporated community in Pennsylvania, US

- Unincorporated community
- Location within Pennsylvania Location within the United States
- Coordinates: 39°44′55″N 77°53′28″W
- Country: United States
- State: Pennsylvania
- County: Franklin
- Township: Montgomery
- Elevation: 591 ft (180 m)
- Time zone: UTC-5 (Eastern (EST))
  - Summer (DST): UTC-4 (EDT)
- ZIP code: 17236
- Area code: 717
- GNIS feature ID: 1192704

Kasiesville is an unincorporated community in Montgomery Township in Franklin County, Pennsylvania, United States. Kasiesville is located on Pennsylvania Route 75, south of Mercersburg and north of the Maryland border.

A variant name was "Camp Hill". The community was founded as "Camp Hill" circa 1830. A post office called Kasiesville was established in 1893, and remained in operation until 1905.
