= Montgomery Township, Franklin County, Pennsylvania =

Township in Pennsylvania, US

Coordinates: 39°44′00″N 77°49′59″W

- Township
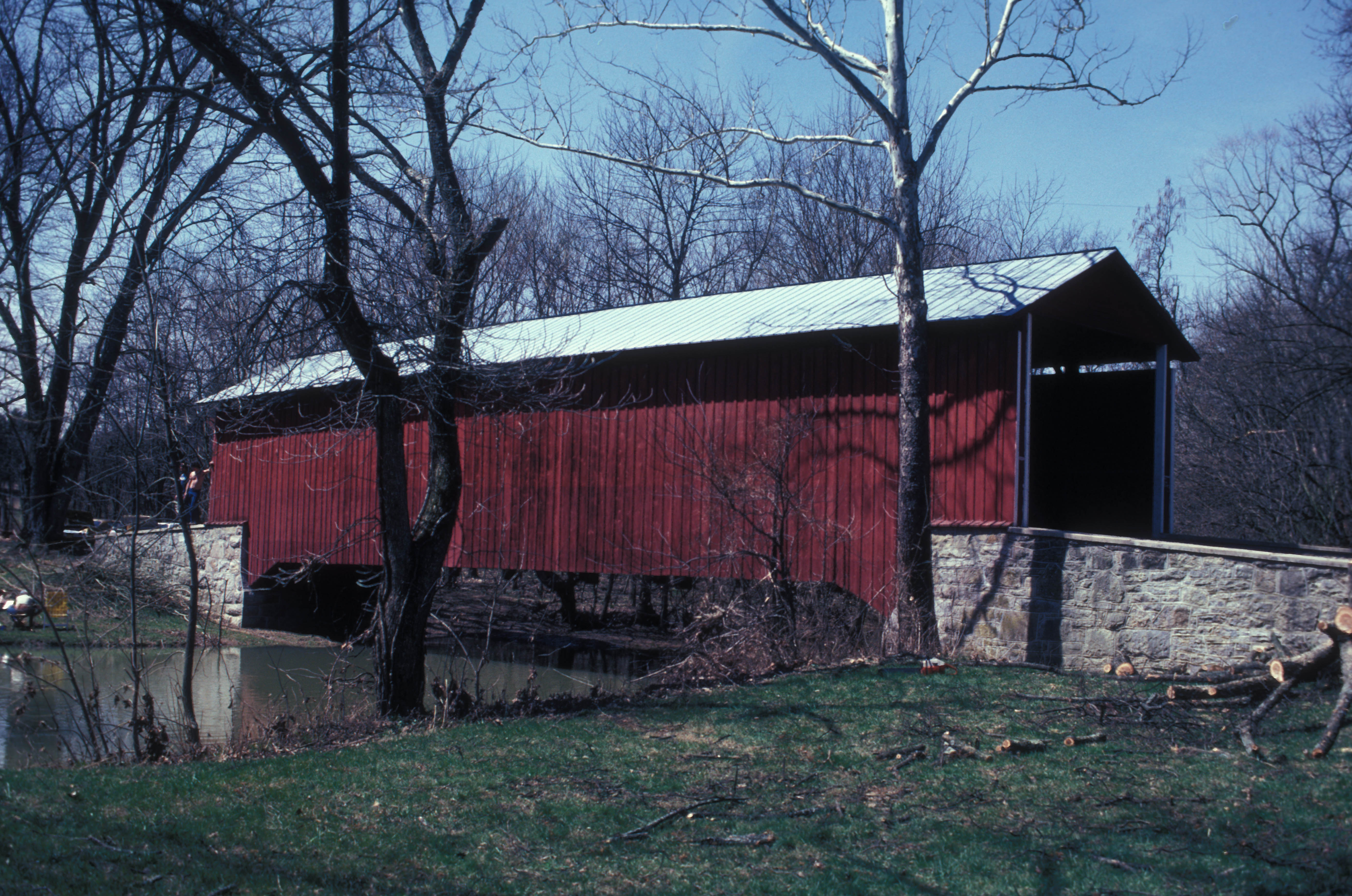
- Hays Covered Bridge

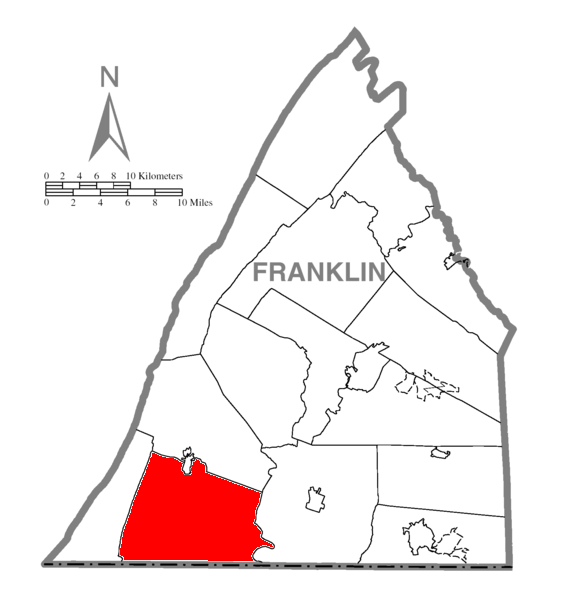
- Map of Franklin County, Pennsylvania highlighting Montgomery Township

- Map of Franklin County, Pennsylvania
- Country: United States
- State: Pennsylvania
- County: Franklin
- Settled: 1730
- Incorporated: 1781

Area
  - Total: 67.44 sq mi (174.66 km^{2})
  - Land: 67.36 sq mi (174.47 km^{2})
  - Water: 0.073 sq mi (0.19 km^{2})

Population (2020)
  - Total: 5,740
  - Estimate (2016): 6,196
  - Density: 92.0/sq mi (35.51/km^{2})
- Time zone: UTC-5 (Eastern (EST))
  - Summer (DST): UTC-4 (EDT)
- Area code: 717
- FIPS code: 42-055-50616

Montgomery Township is a township that is located in Franklin County, Pennsylvania, United States. The population was 5,740 at the time of the 2020 census, an increase from the 4,949 figure that was counted during the 2000 census.

== History ==
The township was named after Richard Montgomery, a general in the American Revolution.

Mansfield, Robert Kennedy Memorial Presbyterian Church, Hays Bridge Historic District, Angle Farm, Millmont Farm, Rock Hill Farm, and the Col. John Work House are listed on the National Register of Historic Places.

== Geography ==
The township is located in southwestern Franklin County, bordered to the south by Washington County, Maryland. The western border of the township follows the ridgecrest of Cove Mountain, the eastern border follows Conococheague Creek in part, and the southern border is part of the Mason–Dixon line. The borough of Mercersburg lies along part of the northern edge of the township.

Two Top Mountain, Claylick Mountain, Kasies Knob, and Rickard Mountain, all part of the Bear Pond Mountains, are located in the southern part of the township. Cross Mountain, the highest point in the Bear Pond Mountains at 2,062 feet (628 m), is situated at the south end of Cove Mountain. Whitetail Ski Resort is located on the eastern side of Two Top Mountain.

Pennsylvania Route 75 crosses the center of the township, leading north into Mercersburg and south to the Maryland border. Pennsylvania Route 16 crosses the northern part of the township, leading northwest into Mercersburg and east to Greencastle. Unincorporated communities in the township include Kasiesville, Claylick and Shimpstown along PA 75.

Welsh Run is located in the eastern part of the township, and Nova is in the southeast.

According to the United States Census Bureau, the township has a total area of 67.5 square miles (174.7 km^{2}), of which 67.4 square miles (174.5 km^{2}) is land and 0.1 square miles (0.2 km^{2}), or 0.11%, is water.

=== Neighboring townships ===
- Antrim Township (east)
- Peters Township (north)
- Warren Township (west)

== Communities ==
- Bino
- Claylick
- Kasiesville
- Lenwood Heights
- Nova
- Shimpstown
- Welsh Run

== Demographics ==
Historical population
Census	Pop.	Note	%±
2000	4,949		—
2010	6,116		23.6%
2020	5,740		−6.1%
2016 (est.)	6,196		1.3%
U.S. Decennial Census

As of the census of 2000, there were 4,949 people, 1,782 households, and 1,448 families residing in the township.

The population density was 73.8 inhabitants per square mile (28.5/km^{2}). There were 1,849 housing units at an average density of 27.6 per square mile (10.7/km^{2}).

The racial makeup of the township was 99.23% White, 0.24% African American, 0.12% Native American, 0.06% Asian, 0.16% from other races, and 0.18% from two or more races. Hispanic or Latino of any race were 0.44% of the population.

There were 1,782 households, out of which 35.5% had children under the age of eighteen living with them; 72.2% were married couples living together, 4.0% had a female householder with no husband present, and 18.7% were non-families. 15.0% of all households were made up of individuals, and 5.7% had someone living alone who was sixty-five years of age or older.

The average household size was 2.78 and the average family size was 3.07.

Within the township the population was spread out, with 25.7% of residents who were under the age of eighteen, 7.2% who were aged eighteen to twenty-four, 31.0% who were aged twenty-five to forty-four, 26.3% who were aged forty-five to sixty-four, and 9.8% who were sixty-five years of age or older. The median age was thirty-seven years.

For every one hundred females there were 109.8 males. For every one hundred females who were aged eighteen or older, there were 106.2 males.

The median income for a household in the township was $47,538, and the median income for a family was $50,653. Males had a median income of $31,364 compared with that of $23,775 for females.

The per capita income for the township was $18,699.

Approximately 3.7% of families and 7.0% of the population were living below the poverty line, including 9.5% of those who were under the age of eighteen and 10.3% of those who were aged sixty-five or older.

== Gallery ==
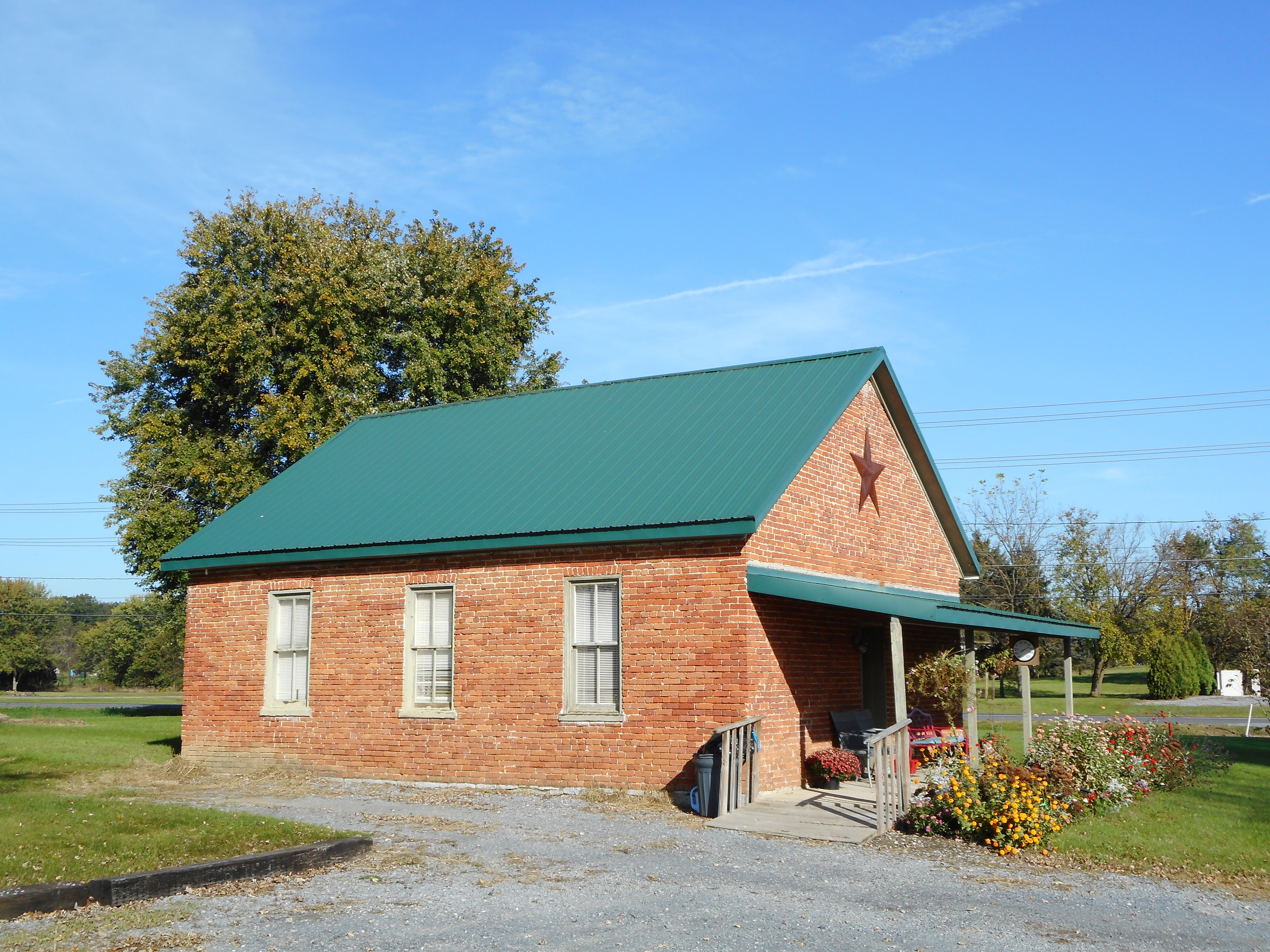
House on Anderson Road

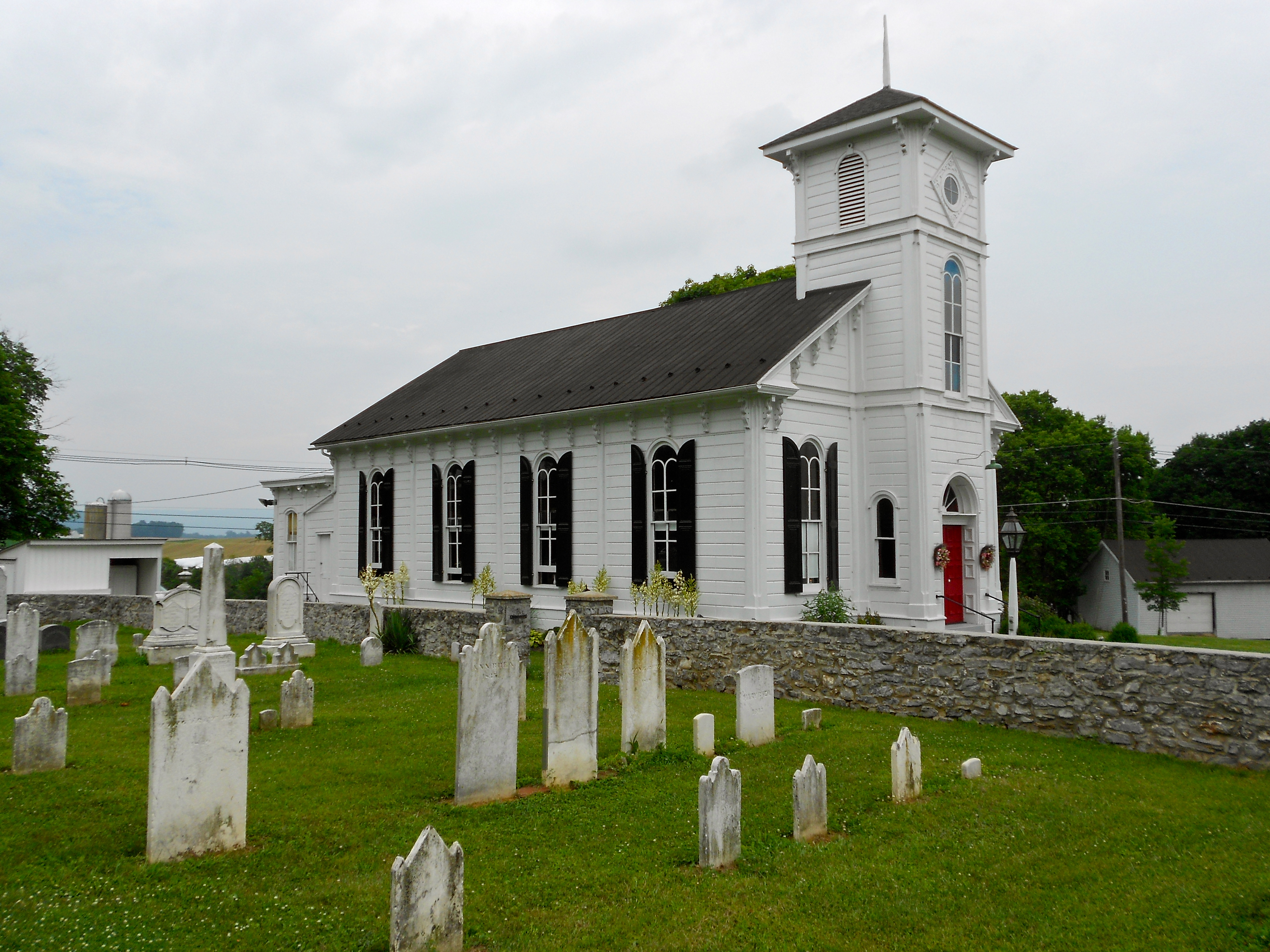
Robert Kennedy Memorial Presbyterian Church
