= St. Thomas Township, Pennsylvania =

Township in Pennsylvania, US

Coordinates: 39°54′40″N 77°49′08″W

St. Thomas Township
- Township
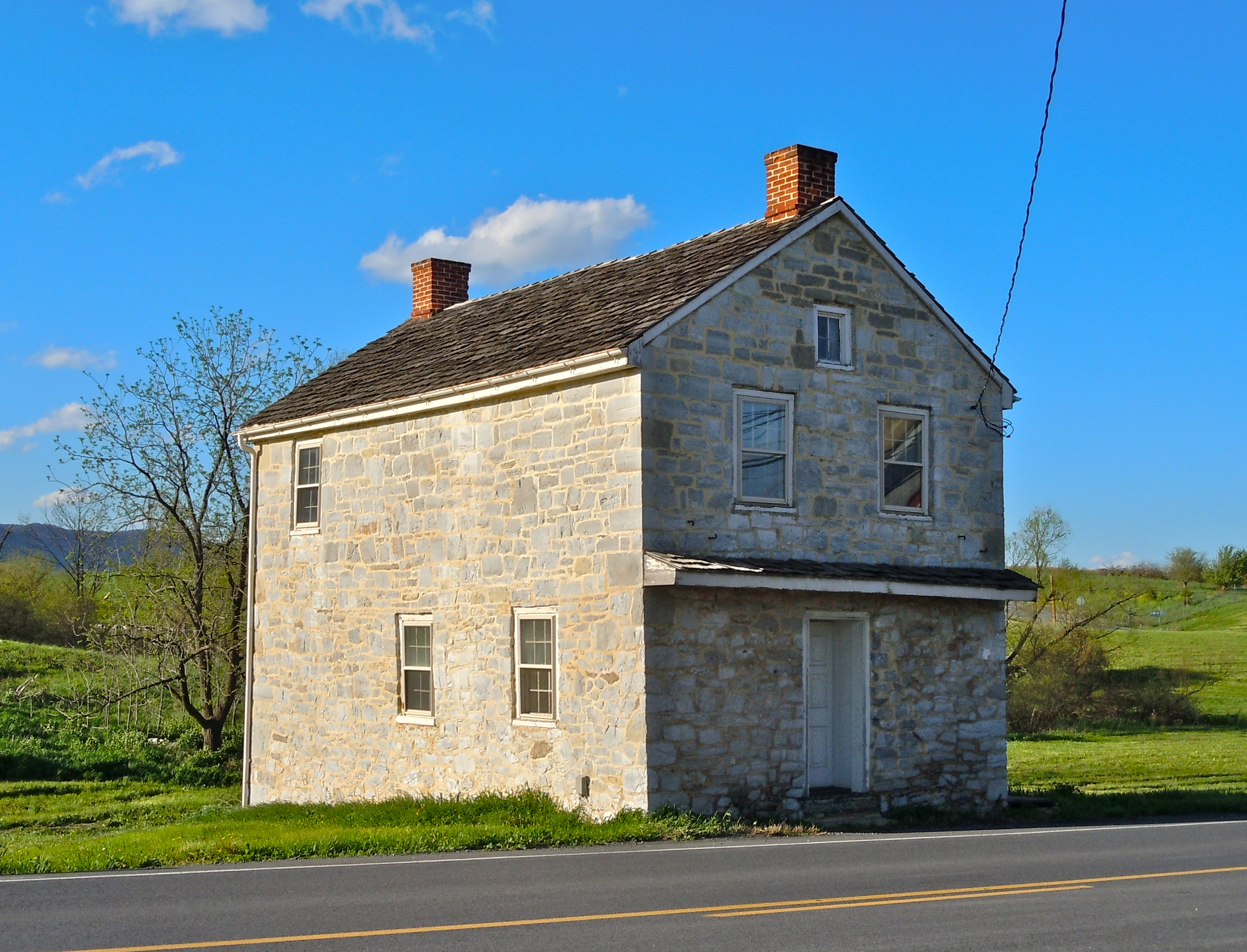
- The Toll House along U.S. Route 30

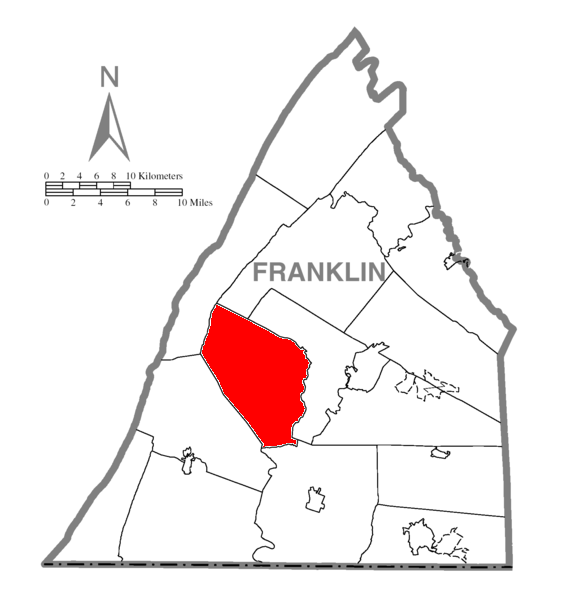
- Map of Franklin County, Pennsylvania highlighting St. Thomas Township

- Map of Franklin County, Pennsylvania
- Country: United States
- State: Pennsylvania
- County: Franklin
- Settled: 1731
- Incorporated: 1818

Area
  - Total: 51.90 sq mi (134.41 km^{2})
  - Land: 51.87 sq mi (134.33 km^{2})
  - Water: 0.031 sq mi (0.08 km^{2})

Population (2020)
  - Total: 5,917
  - Estimate (2016): 5,978
  - Density: 115/sq mi (44.5/km^{2})
- Time zone: UTC-5 (Eastern (EST))
  - Summer (DST): UTC-4 (EDT)
- Area code: 717
- FIPS code: 42-055-67400

St. Thomas Township is a township in Franklin County, Pennsylvania, United States. The population was 5,917 at the 2020 census.

It is the birthplace of both Baseball Hall of Fame member Nellie Fox, and United States Army brigadier general and legislator, Charles Thomas Campbell.

== History ==
The Franklin Furnace Historic District, Chambersburg and Bedford Turnpike Road Company Toll House, and Woodland are listed on the National Register of Historic Places.

The account of the township's formation was lost when the Confederates burned the county seat Chambersburg in 1864, but according to the recollection of older citizens the township was organized ca. 1818 on territory taken from Peters and Hamilton townships. The area was settled in the 1740s by, among others, Col. John Armstrong, John Campbell, and John Dixon. There were several Campbell families among the early settlers, and an eighteenth-century map labels the village simply "Campbells". It was later called "Campbelltown", a designation that prevailed for many years until, at the suggestion of William Archibald, it received the official designation "St. Thomas", purportedly still honoring Thomas Campbell, who had laid out the village. The name "Saint Thomas" was reportedly a joke concerning Thomas Campbell's tendency to swear. The organization of the town appears to have been concurrent with the organization of the St. Thomas or "Campbeltown" Presbyterian Church in 1818. Not long afterwards local Evangelical Lutheran and German Reformed congregations joined the Presbyterians in the erection of a church building, which the three congregations shared from 1829 until 1854.

== Geography ==
The township is in west-central Franklin County, in the Great Appalachian Valley, but extending northwest to include the first four ridges of the Ridge and Valley Province of the Appalachian Mountains: from east to west, Front Mountain, Broad Mountain, Little Mountain, and Blue Mountain. Conodoguinet Creek, a tributary of the Susquehanna River, rises in the extreme western corner of the township, at the juncture of Little and Blue mountains. The rest of the township is drained by tributaries of Conococheague Creek, part of the Potomac River watershed.

U.S. Route 30 crosses the township, leading east to Chambersburg, the county seat, and west to McConnellsburg. It passes through the unincorporated community of St. Thomas at the center of the township. The community of Williamson is at the southern corner of the township, where Back Creek joins Conococheague Creek.

According to the United States Census Bureau, the township has a total area of 51.9 square miles (134.3 km^{2}), of which 0.03 square miles (0.08 km^{2}), or 0.06%, is water.

=== Neighboring townships ===
- Antrim Township (southeast)
- Hamilton Township (mainly east)
- Letterkenny Township (north)
- Metal Township (northwest)
- Peters Township (west)

== Communities ==
- Carlton Heights
- Edenville
- Franklin Furnace
- Saint Thomas
- Stone Bridge
- Williamson

== Demographics ==
Historical population
Census	Pop.	Note	%±
2000	5,775		—
2010	5,935		2.8%
2020	5,917		−0.3%
2016 (est.)	5,978		0.7%
U.S. Decennial Census

As of the census of 2000, there were 5,917 people, 2,141 households, and 1,665 families residing in the township. The population density was 111.7 inhabitants per square mile (43.1/km^{2}). There were 2,292 housing units at an average density of 44.3 per square mile (17.1/km^{2}). The racial makeup of the township was 97.96% White, 0.66% African American, 0.26% Native American, 0.28% Asian, 0.24% from other races, and 0.61% from two or more races. Hispanic or Latino of any race were 0.74% of the population.

There were 2,141 households, out of which 34.0% had children under the age of 18 living with them, 66.7% were married couples living together, 6.9% had a female householder with no husband present, and 22.2% were non-families. 17.8% of all households were made up of individuals, and 7.7% had someone living alone who was 65 years of age or older. The average household size was 2.68 and the average family size was 3.03.

In the township the population was spread out, with 25.4% under the age of 18, 8.1% from 18 to 24, 28.9% from 25 to 44, 25.6% from 45 to 64, and 12.1% who were 65 years of age or older. The median age was 37 years. For every 100 females, there were 102.3 males. For every 100 females age 18 and over, there were 101.3 males.

The median income for a household in the township was $39,980, and the median income for a family was $43,245. Males had a median income of $30,426 versus $21,778 for females. The per capita income for the township was $17,615. About 5.7% of families and 6.7% of the population were below the poverty line, including 5.5% of those under age 18 and 13.2% of those age 65 or over.
