= Back Creek (Conococheague Creek tributary) =

Creek in Franklin County, Pennsylvania, US

Coordinates: 39.8486°N 77.8005°W

Back Creek is a 16.8-mile-long (27.0 km) tributary of Conococheague Creek in south central Pennsylvania in the United States.

The uppermost reaches of the creek, flowing through the Letterkenny Army Depot, are known as Rocky Spring Run or Rocky Spring Branch.

Back Creek joins Conococheague Creek approximately 0.33 miles (0.5 km) below Williamson.

== See also ==
- List of rivers of Pennsylvania
