= Upper Strasburg, Pennsylvania =

Unincorporated community in Pennsylvania, US

- Unincorporated community
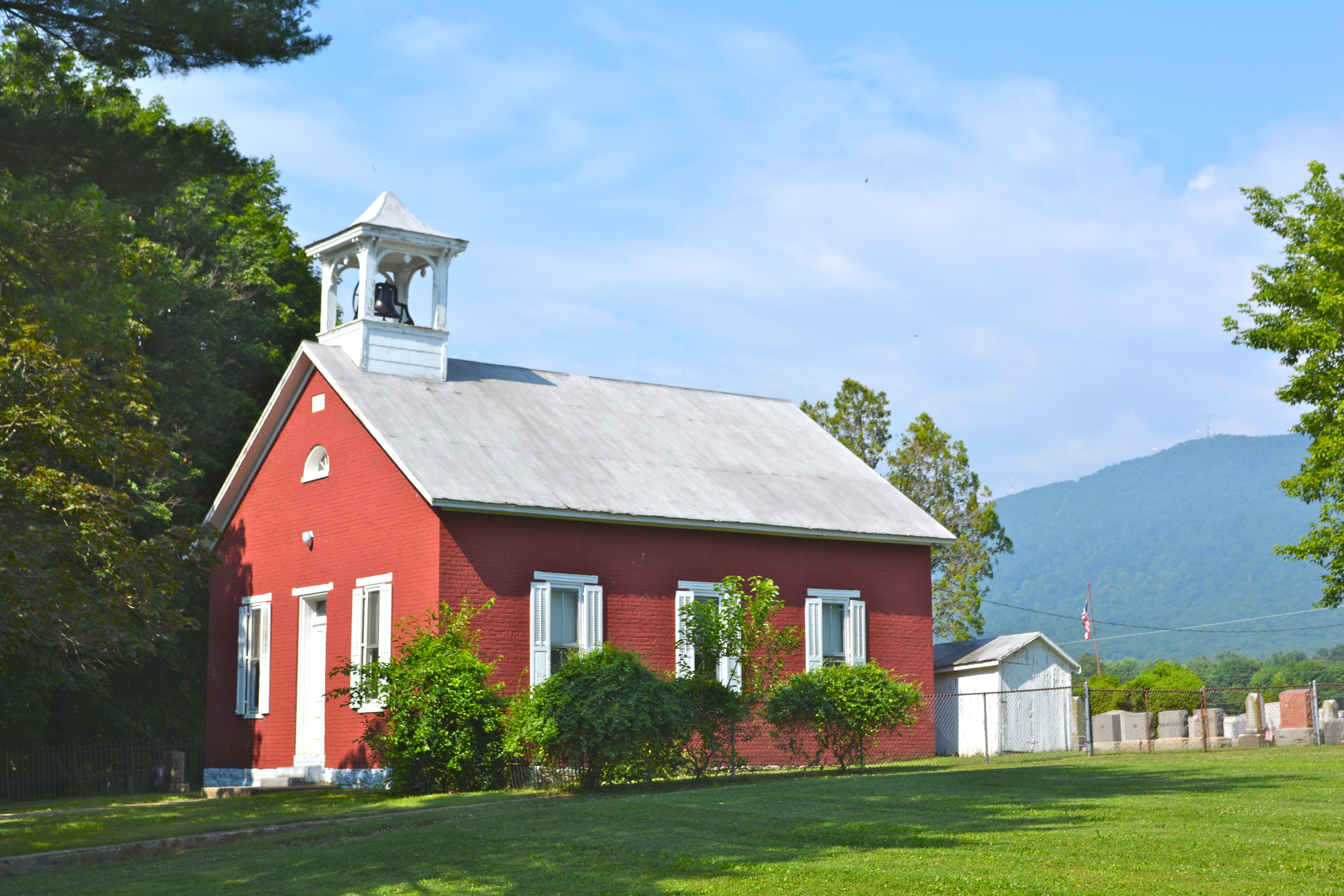
- Methodist church

- Location within Pennsylvania Location within the United States
- Coordinates: 40°3′37″N 77°42′32″W
- Country: United States
- State: Pennsylvania
- County: Franklin
- Township: Letterkenny
- Elevation: 728 ft (222 m)
- Time zone: UTC-5 (Eastern (EST))
  - Summer (DST): UTC-4 (EDT)
- ZIP code: 17265
- Area code: 717
- GNIS feature ID: 1190256

Upper Strasburg is an unincorporated community that is located in Letterkenny Township in Franklin County, Pennsylvania, United States.

It is situated near the Tuscarora Mountain ridge in the Appalachian Mountains at the intersection of Pennsylvania Route 533, State Route 4004 (Mountain Road/Valley Road), and Community Road, northwest of Chambersburg and north of the Letterkenny Army Depot.

== History ==
The road from Upper Strasburg to Fannettsburg and on to Burnt Cabins was built circa 1790 and for many years formed part of the main road from Philadelphia to Pittsburgh. The road is now part of SR 4004 and was known as Three Mountain Road or Horse Valley Road but is generally known as Upper Strasburg Road now.

The town was laid out in 1789 by Dewalt Keefer and serviced Conestoga wagons and travelers crossing the mountains. The early post office, established by 1797, was originally known simply as Strasburg, but the name was changed to Upper Strasburg by 1830 to distinguish it from towns in eastern Pennsylvania.

In 1873, the town had three churches, "one hotel, one steam tannery, one sawmill, two stores, two blacksmith, two shoe-maker, two cabinet-maker, one tailor and one saddler shops, and two hundred ninety-three inhabitants."

== ZIP code information ==
The Upper Strasburg ZIP code 17265 covers 37.93 sq mi (98.2 km^{2}), a population of 496 and 294 housing units, 211 of them occupied.

== Gallery ==
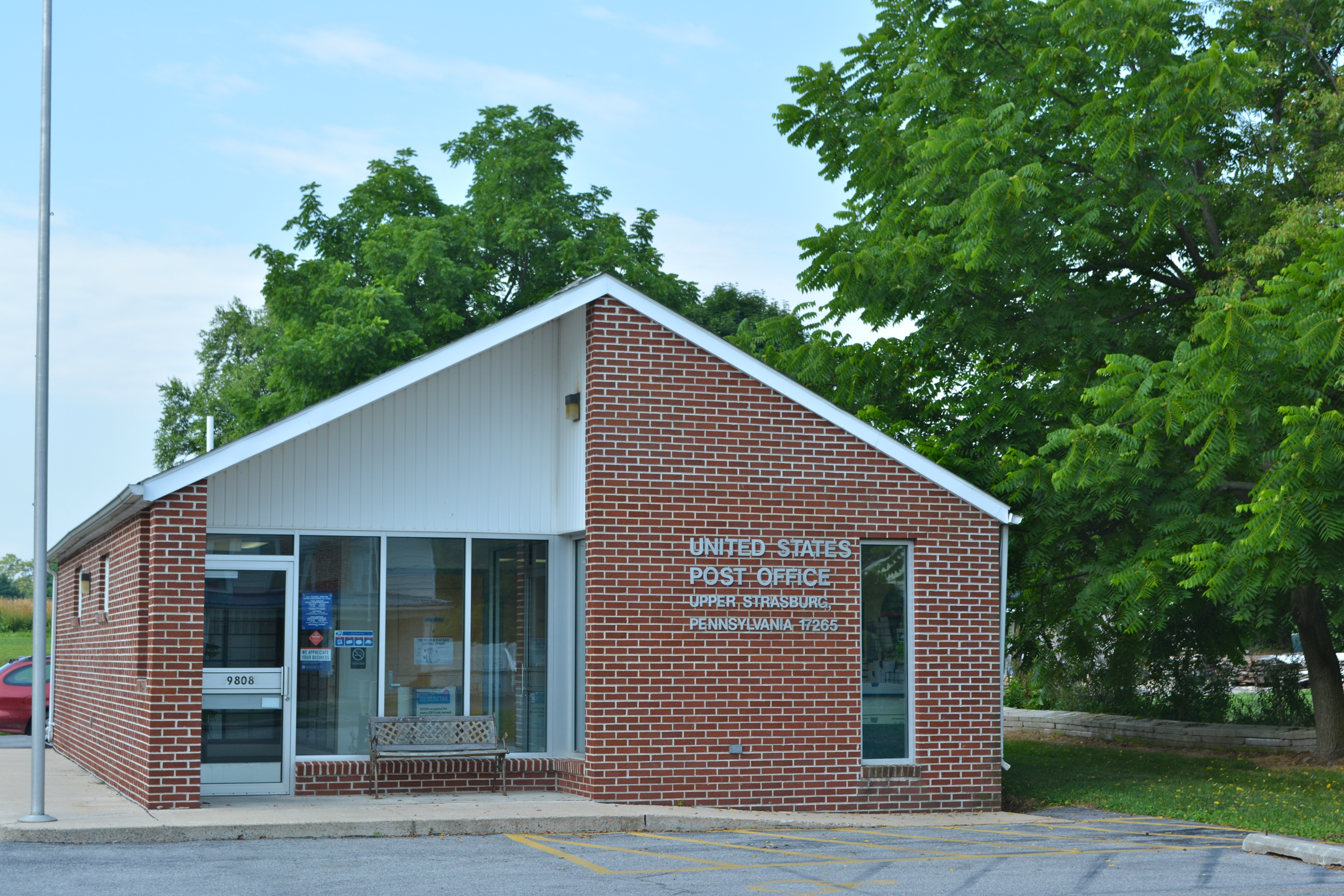
Post office

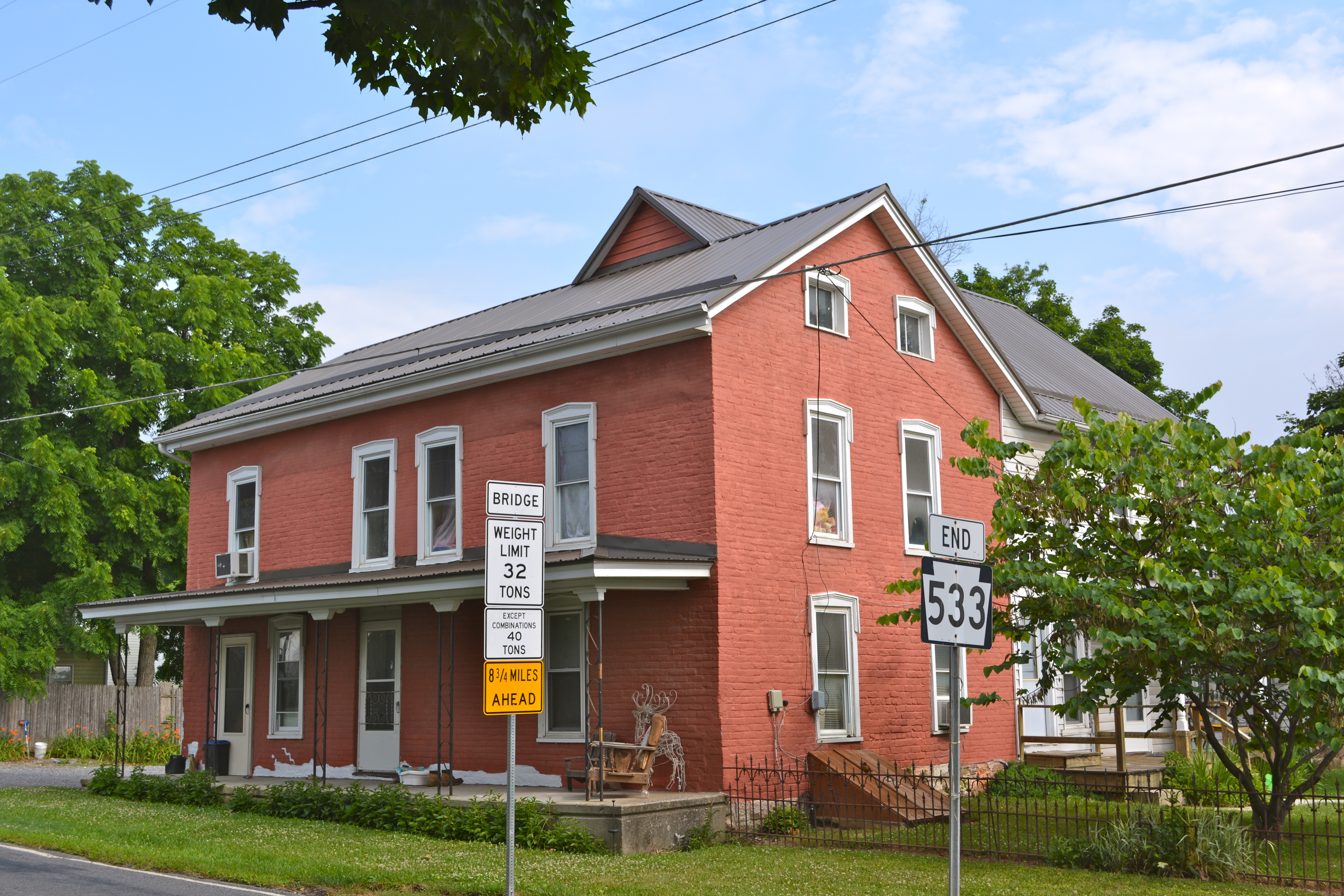
End of PA 533

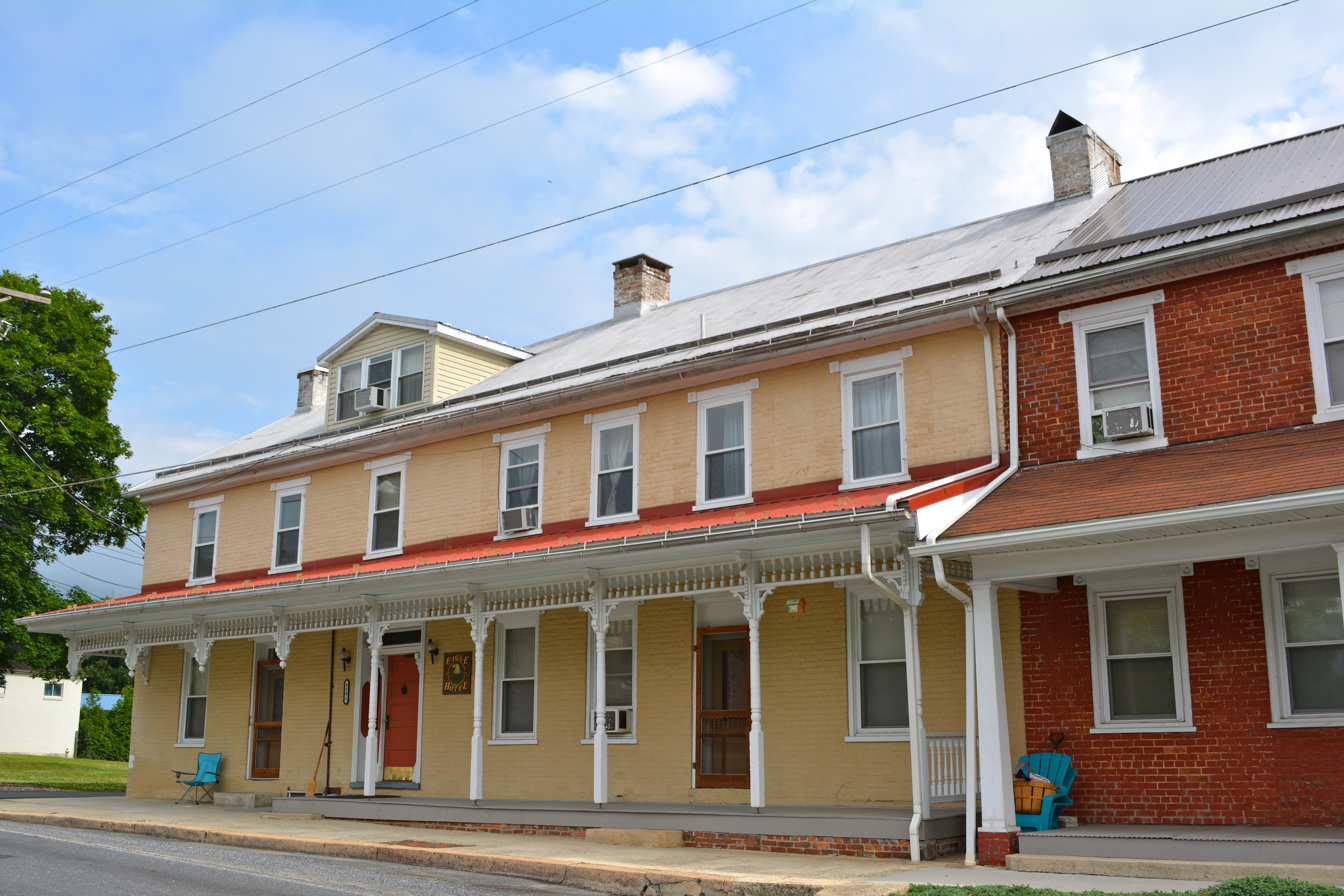
The old Eagle Hotel

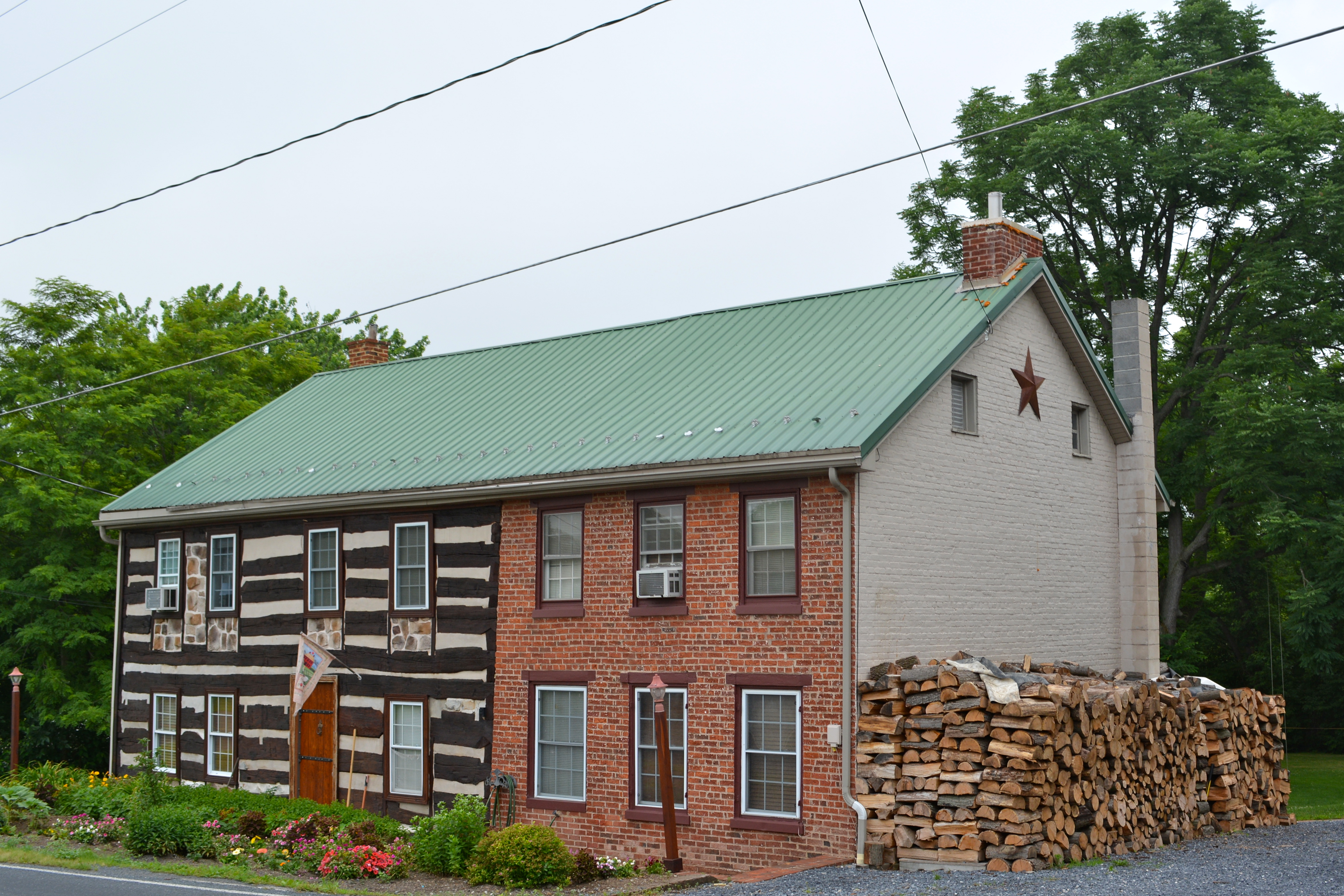
A log house with a brick addition

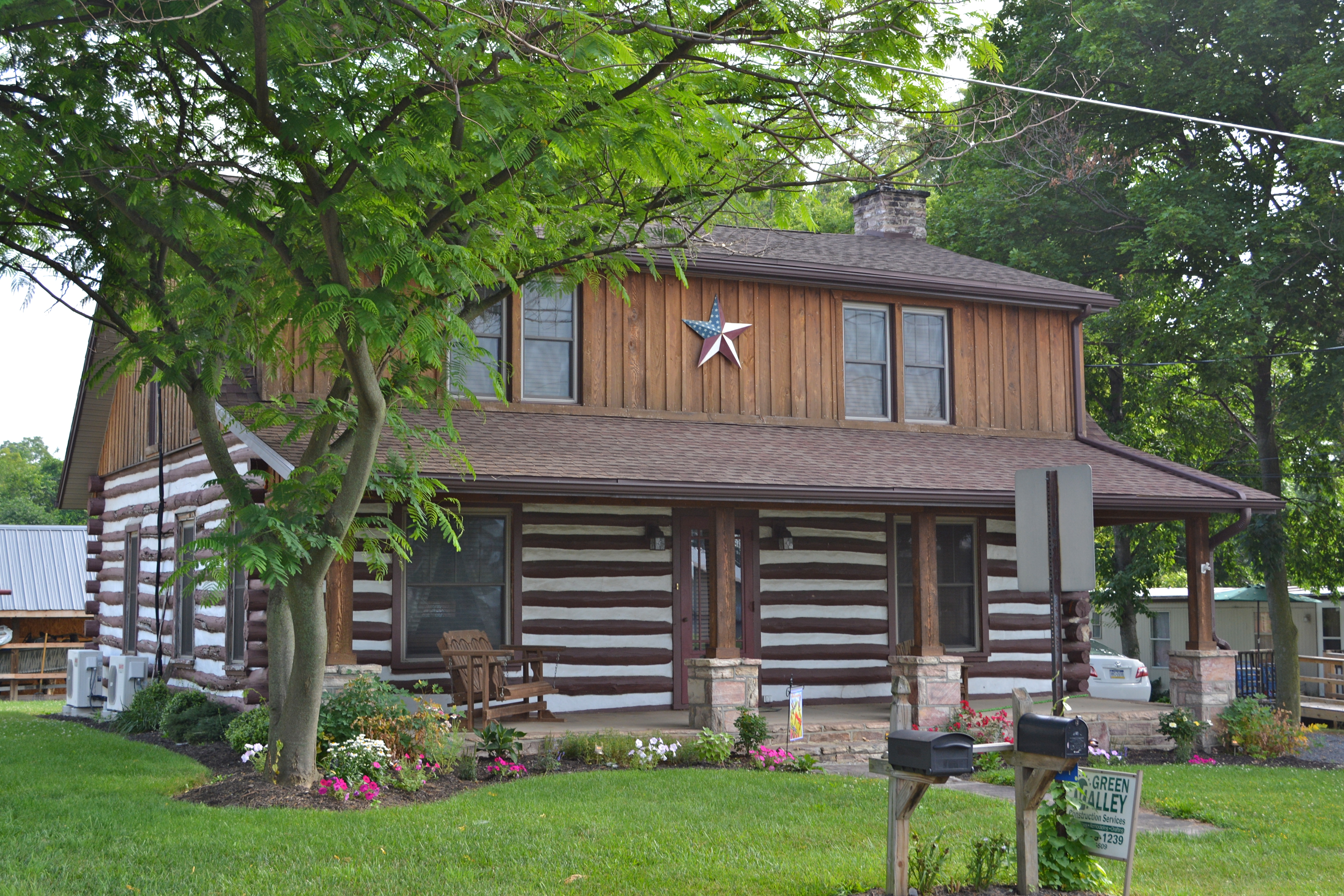
A log house with a barn star

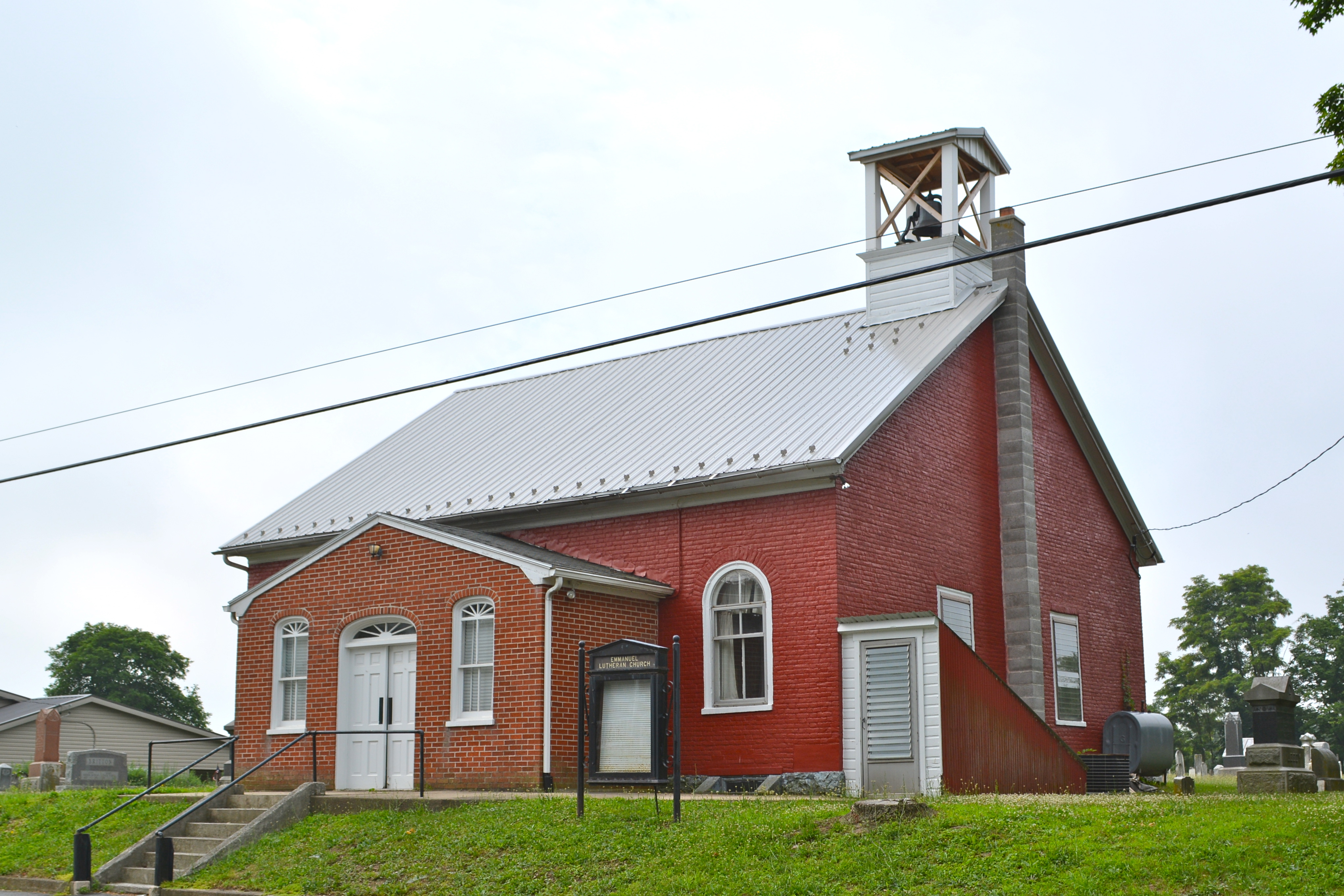
Upper Strasburg Lutheran Church in 2014

== See also ==
- Cowans Gap State Park
- Fort Loudon, Pennsylvania
- Horse Valley Bridge
- Skinner Tavern
