= Letterkenny (disambiguation) =

Letterkenny is a town in County Donegal, Ireland.

Letterkenny may also refer to:

- Letterkenny (TV series), a Canadian comedy, or the fictional town it is set in
- Letterkenny Township, Pennsylvania, US
  - Letterkenny Army Depot
- Letterkenny, Ontario, an unincorporated community in Canada
