= Willow Hill, Pennsylvania =

Unincorporated community in Pennsylvania, US

- Unincorporated community
- Location within Pennsylvania Location within the United States
- Coordinates: 40°6′29″N 77°47′18″W
- Country: United States
- State: Pennsylvania
- County: Franklin
- Township: Metal
- Elevation: 801 ft (244 m)
- Time zone: UTC-5 (Eastern (EST))
  - Summer (DST): UTC-4 (EDT)
- ZIP code: 17271
- Area code: 717
- GNIS feature ID: 1191503

Willow Hill is an unincorporated community in Metal Township in Franklin County, Pennsylvania, United States. Willow Hill is located along Pennsylvania Route 75 at its interchange with the Pennsylvania Turnpike (Interstate 76), which is called the Willow Hill interchange.
