= Bridge in Metal Township =

- U.S. National Register of Historic Places
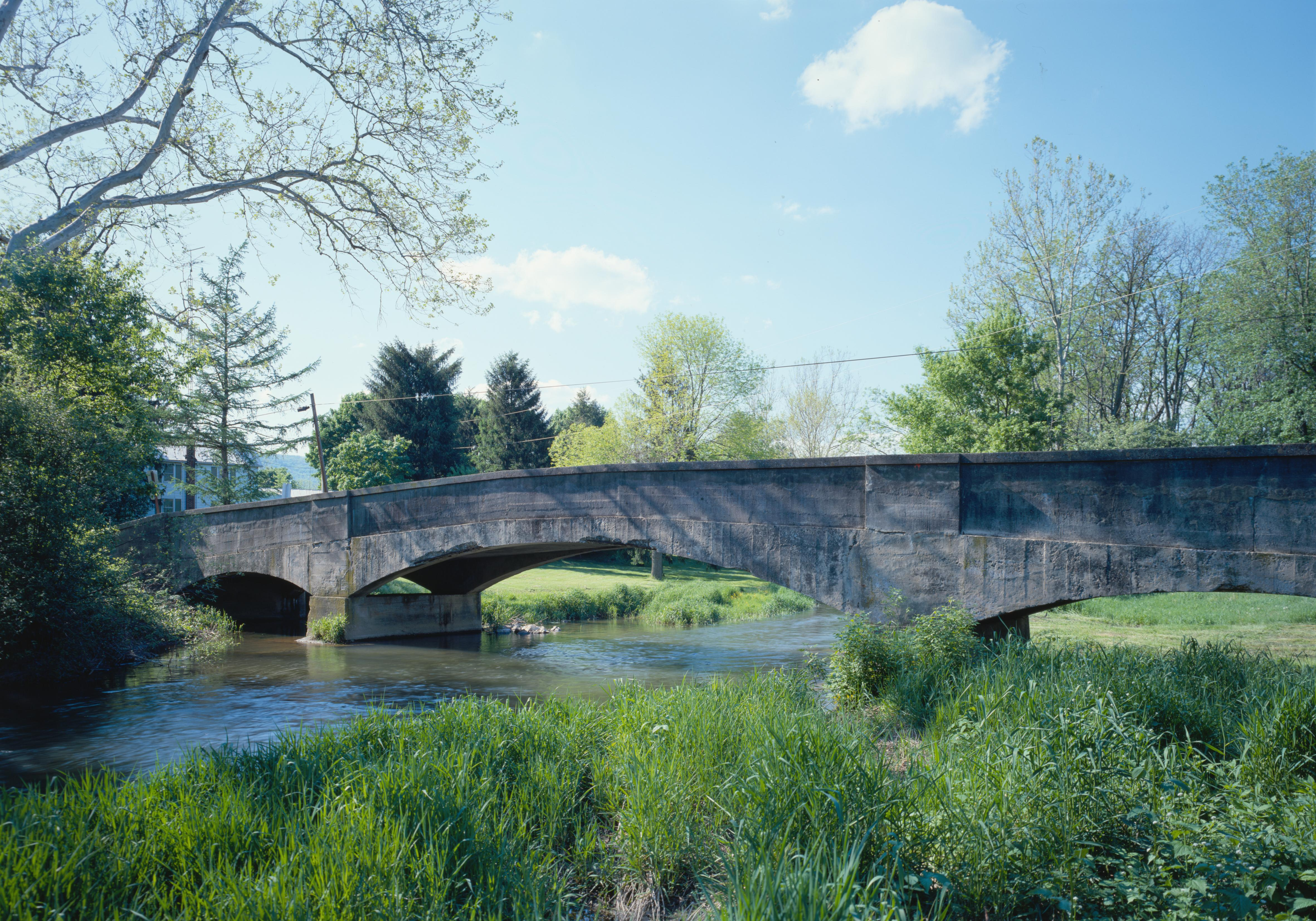
- Bridge in Metal Township, May 2003

- Location within Pennsylvania Location within the United States
- Location: SR 4006 (Legislative Route 45 Spur) (Stone Bridge Road) over West Branch Conococheague Creek, near Willow Hill, Metal Township, Pennsylvania
- Coordinates: 40°07′16″N 77°46′39″W
- Area: less than one acre
- Built: 1907
- Built by: Nelson Construction Co.
- Architectural style: Camelback-shaped arch
- MPS: Highway Bridges Owned by the Commonwealth of Pennsylvania, Department of Transportation TR
- NRHP reference No.: 88000763
- Added to NRHP: June 22, 1988

Bridge in Metal Township, also known as Keggereis Ford Bridge, is a historic multi-span concrete arch bridge located at Metal Township in Franklin County, Pennsylvania. It is a 105-foot-long (32 m) bridge with three spans, the longest of which measures 45 feet (14 m) long. It was constructed in 1907. It carries Stone Bridge Road (State Route 4006) over the West Branch Conococheague Creek.

It was listed on the National Register of Historic Places in 1988.

== See also ==
- List of bridges documented by the Historic American Engineering Record in Pennsylvania
