= Metal Township, Pennsylvania =

Township in Pennsylvania, US

Coordinates: 39°59′00″N 77°52′28″W

Metal Township, Franklin County, Pennsylvania
- Township
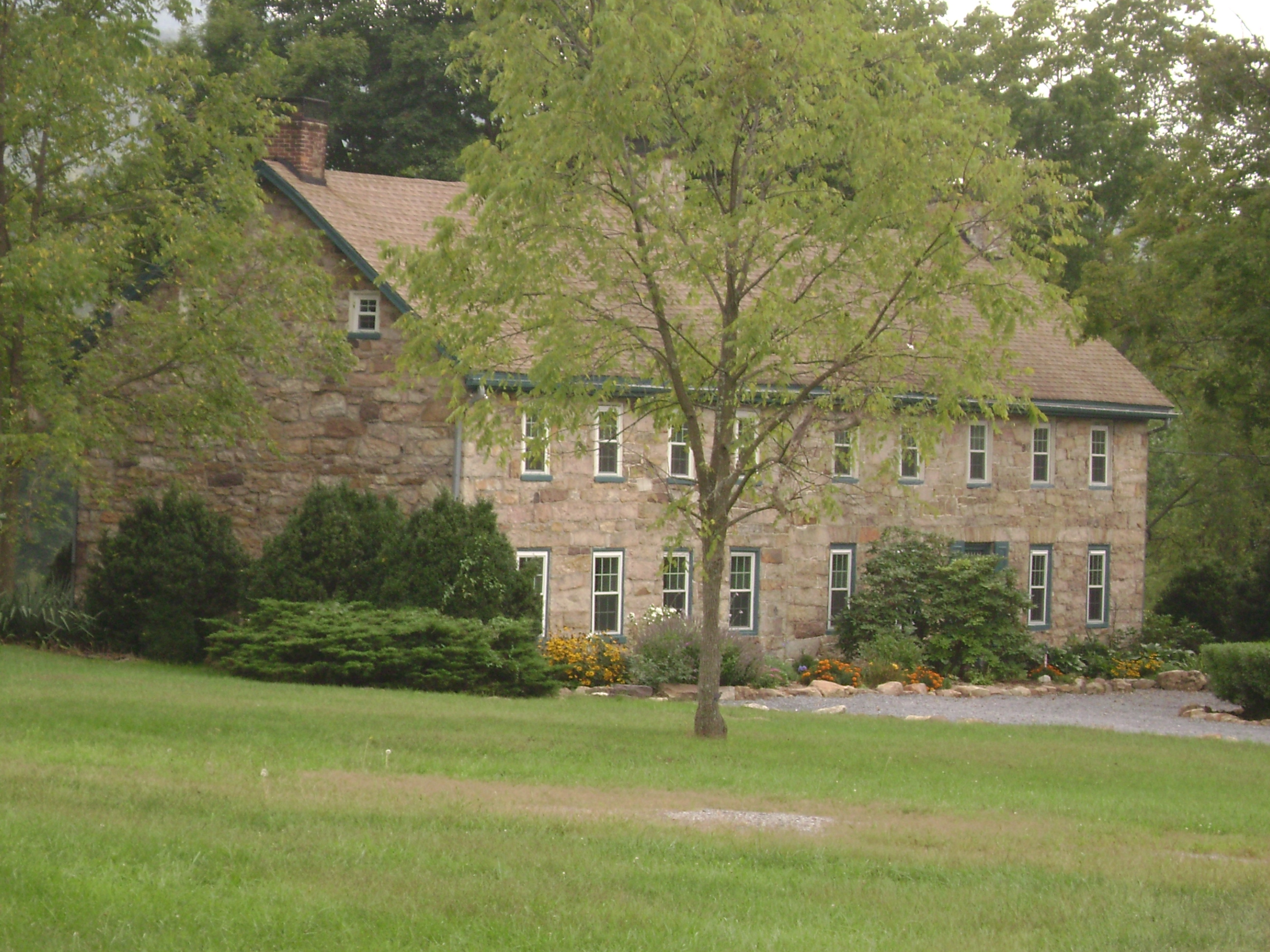
- Mt. Pleasant Iron Works House, a historic site in the township

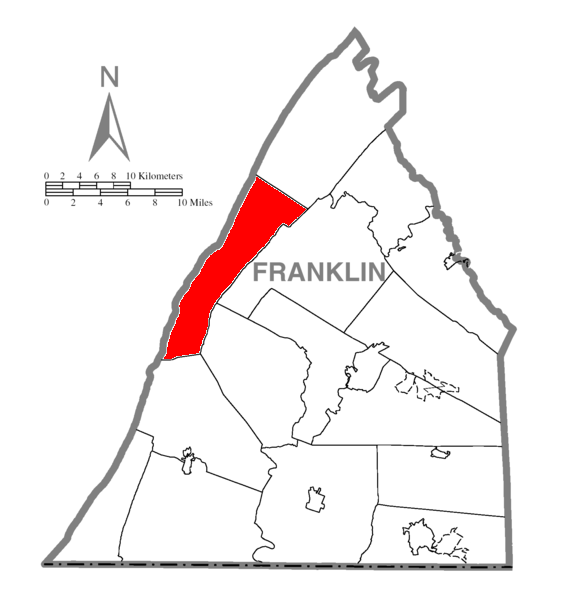
- Map of Franklin County, Pennsylvania highlighting Metal Township

- Map of Franklin County, Pennsylvania
- Country: United States
- State: Pennsylvania
- County: Franklin
- Settled: 1763
- Incorporated: 1795

Area
  - Total: 44.60 sq mi (115.52 km^{2})
  - Land: 44.53 sq mi (115.34 km^{2})
  - Water: 0.069 sq mi (0.18 km^{2})

Population (2020)
  - Total: 1,768
  - Estimate (2016): 1,871
  - Density: 42.0/sq mi (16.22/km^{2})
- Time zone: UTC-5 (Eastern (EST))
  - Summer (DST): UTC-4 (EDT)
- Area code: 717
- FIPS code: 42-055-48888

Historical population
Census	Pop.	Note	%±
2000	1,721		—
2010	1,866		8.4%
2020	1,768		−5.3%
2016 (est.)	1,871		0.3%
U.S. Decennial Census

Metal Township is a township that is located in Franklin County, Pennsylvania, United States. The population was 1,768 at the time of the 2020 census.

== History ==
Metal Township was so named on account of deposits of metal ores within its borders.

The Bridge in Metal Township, Carrick Furnace, and Mt. Pleasant Iron Works House are listed on the National Register of Historic Places.

== Geography ==
The township is located along the western edge of Franklin County, bordered to the west by Huntingdon and Fulton counties. The western border of the township (and county line) follows the crest of Tuscarora Mountain, while the eastern border follows the crest of Kittatinny Mountain. The space between the mountains is known as Path Valley and comprises the settled portion of the township. The valley is drained by the West Branch Conococheague Creek, part of the Potomac River watershed.

Pennsylvania Route 75 runs the length of the township, through the center of Path Valley. From south to north, it passes through the unincorporated communities of Richmond Furnace, Metal, Fannettsburg (the largest community in the township), Springtown, and Willow Hill. Interstate 76, the Pennsylvania Turnpike, runs through the northern part of the township, with access from Exit 189, the Willow Hill Interchange. The turnpike passes through the Tuscarora Mountain Tunnel at the western border of the township.

According to the United States Census Bureau, the township has a total area of 44.6 square miles (115.5 km^{2}), of which 44.5 square miles (115.3 km^{2}) is land and 0.1 square miles (0.2 km^{2}), or 0.15%, is water.

=== Neighboring Townships ===
- Dublin Township (Fulton County), (west)
- Dublin Township (Huntingdon County), (northwest)
- Fannett Township (north)
- Letterkenny Township (east)
- Peters Township (south)
- St. Thomas Township (southeast)
- Todd Township (Fulton County), (southwest)

== Communities ==
- Boggstown
- Carrick Valley
- Cowans Village
- Fannettsburg
- Metal
- Mountain Green
- Richmond Furnace
- Springtown
- Sweetwater
- Willow Hill

== Demographics ==
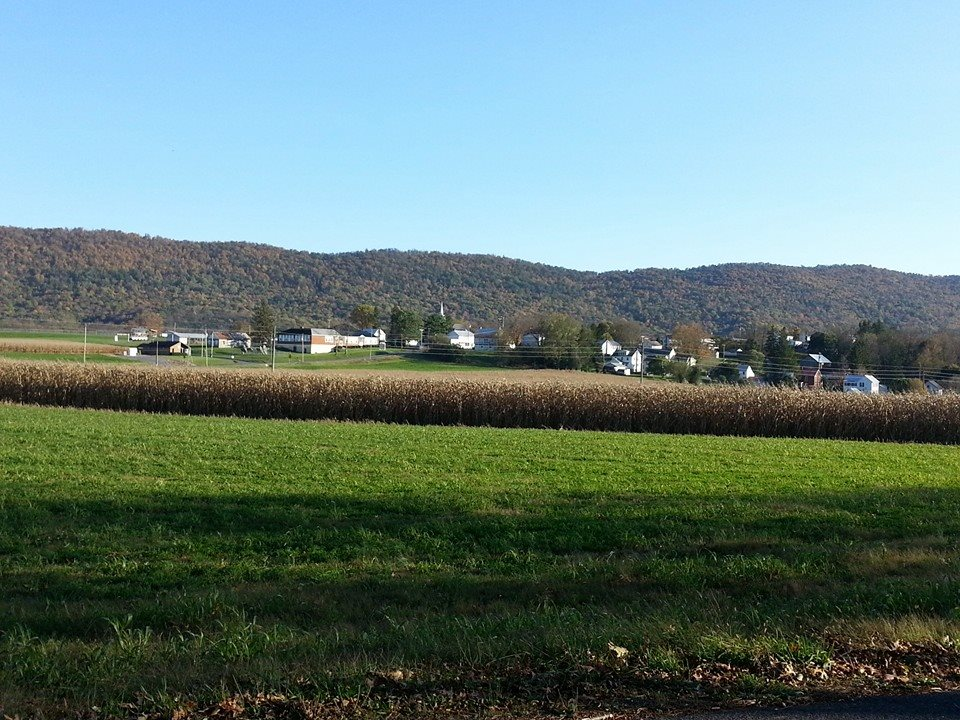
Fannettsburg from north of town in October 2013

As of the census of 2000, there were 1,721 people, 663 households, and 487 families residing in the township. The population density was 38.7 inhabitants per square mile (14.9/km^{2}). There were 782 housing units at an average density of 17.6/sq mi (6.8/km^{2}). The racial makeup of the township was 99.07% White, 0.35% African American, 0.17% Asian, 0.23% from other races, and 0.17% from two or more races. Hispanic or Latino of any race were 0.41% of the population.

There were 663 households, out of which 30.3% had children under the age of 18 living with them, 61.5% were married couples living together, 7.2% had a female householder with no husband present, and 26.5% were non-families. 20.4% of all households were made up of individuals, and 8.6% had someone living alone who was 65 years of age or older. The average household size was 2.60 and the average family size was 2.95.

In the township the population was spread out, with 24.8% under the age of 18, 6.5% from 18 to 24, 31.0% from 25 to 44, 24.6% from 45 to 64, and 13.1% who were 65 years of age or older. The median age was 37 years. For every 100 females, there were 101.5 males. For every 100 females age 18 and over, there were 100.6 males.

The median income for a household in the township was $35,417, and the median income for a family was $38,750. Males had a median income of $28,725 versus $21,167 for females. The per capita income for the township was $15,958. About 9.6% of families and 12.8% of the population were below the poverty line, including 21.9% of those under age 18 and 8.9% of those age 65 or over.

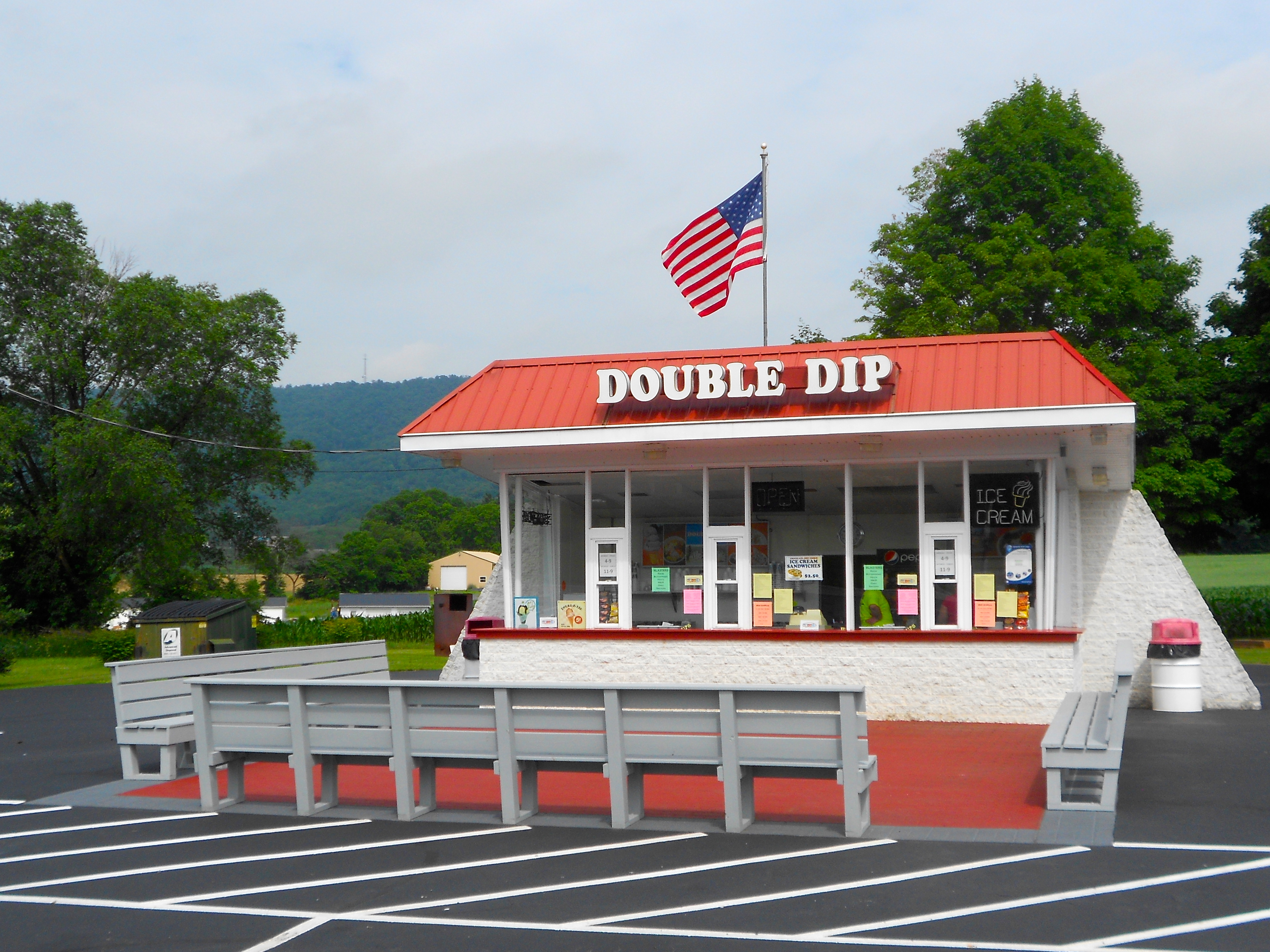
Double Dip ice cream stand

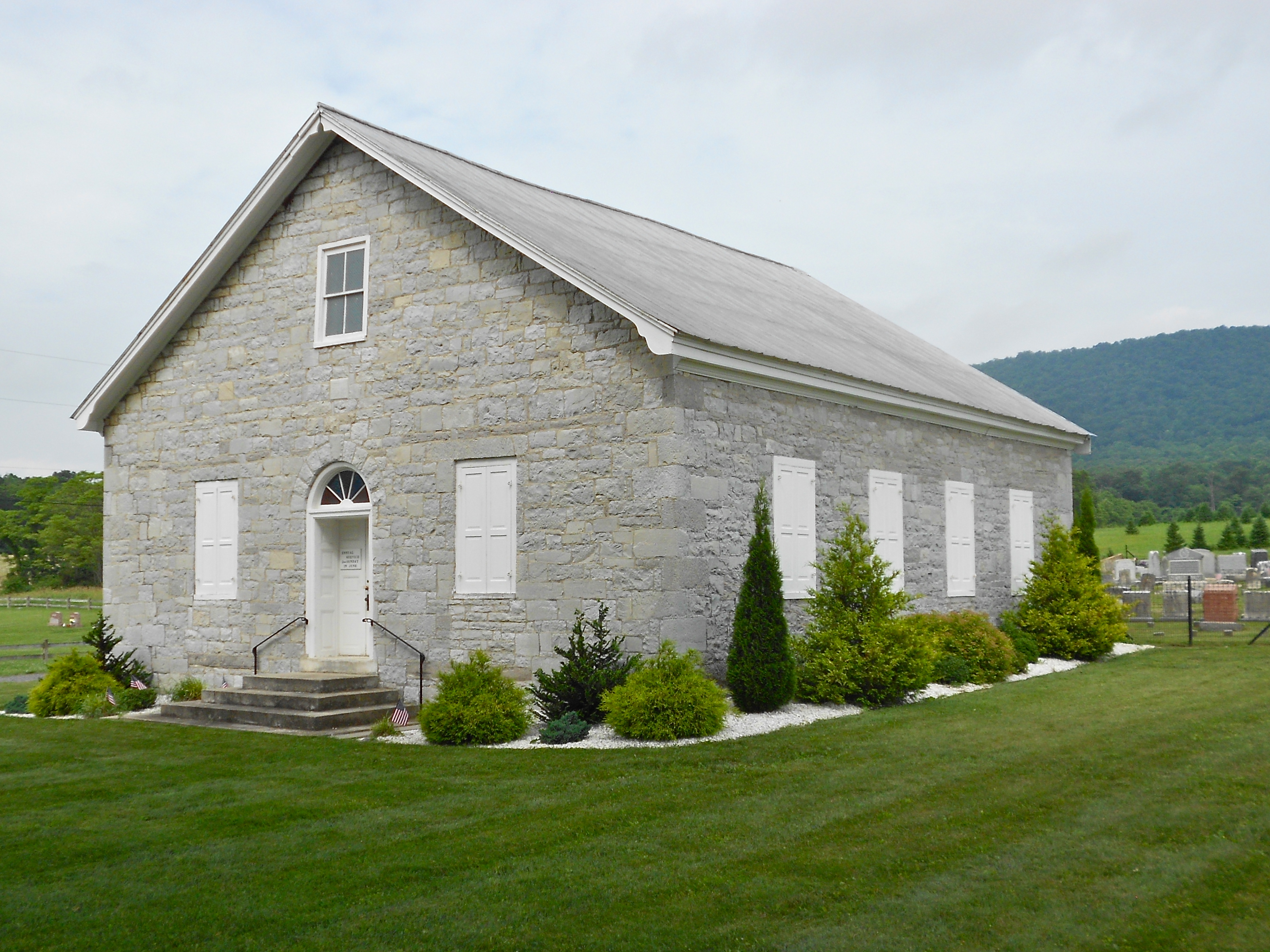
Reformed church north of Fannettsburg
