= Franklin Furnace Historic District =

Historic district in Pennsylvania, United States

- U.S. National Register of Historic Places
- U.S. Historic district
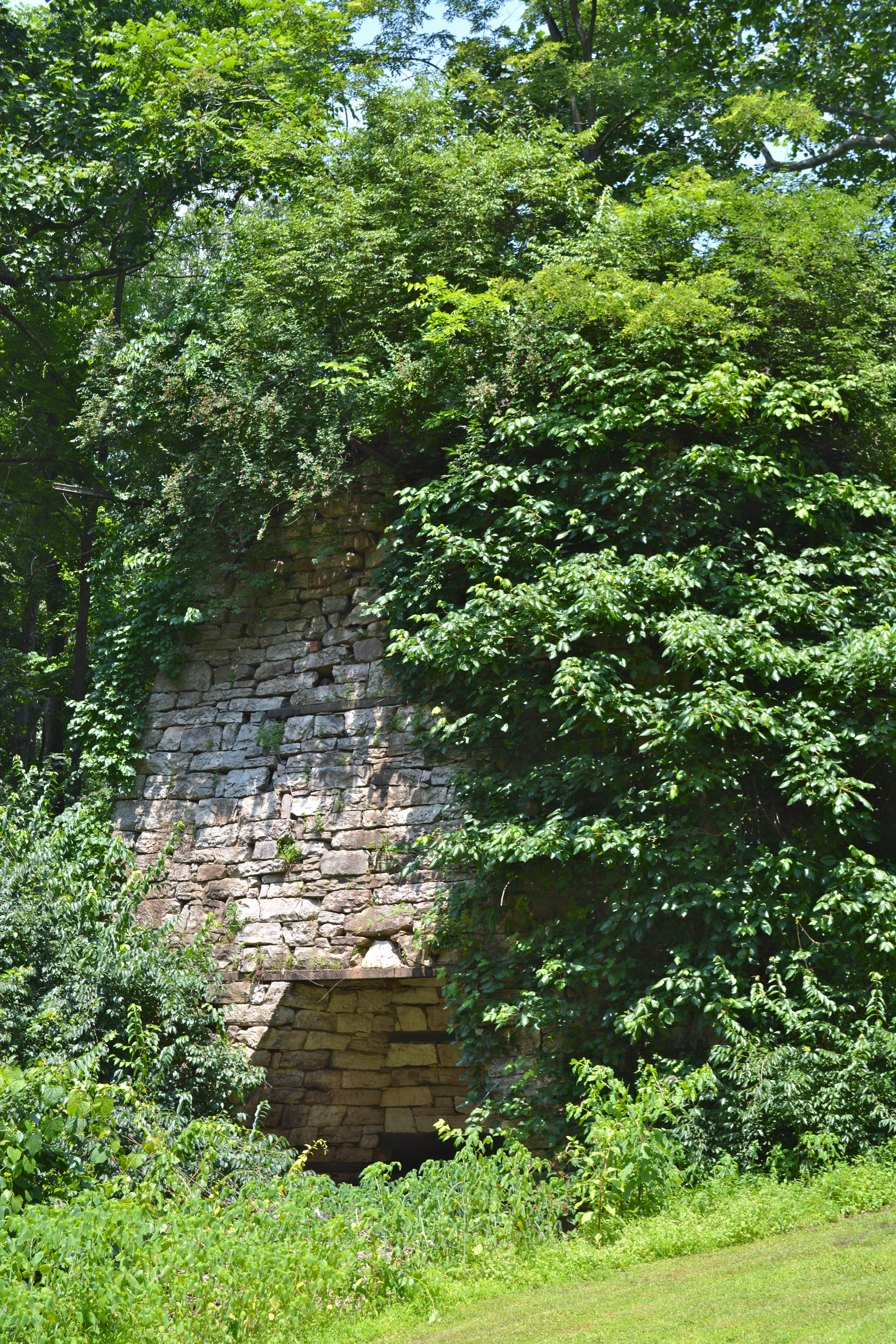

- Location within Pennsylvania Location within the United States
- Location: Roughly bounded by Circle Drive and Cinder Street, near Edenville, St. Thomas Township, Pennsylvania
- Coordinates: 39°57′32″N 77°49′21″W
- Area: 4 acres (1.6 ha)
- Built: 1828
- Architectural style: Iron furnace
- MPS: Iron and Steel Resources of Pennsylvania MPS
- NRHP reference No.: 91001136
- Added to NRHP: September 6, 1991

Franklin Furnace Historic District is a national historic district located in St. Thomas Township, Franklin County, Pennsylvania. The district includes five contributing buildings, one contributing structure, and one contributing site associated with a 19th-century iron furnace plantation. The buildings are the manager's house/office and four workers' houses. The structure is the furnace stack (1828). It measures 30 feet square at the base and approximately 30 feet tall. The contributing site is the ruins of a barn. The furnace ceased full operation in 1882.

It was listed on the National Register of Historic Places in 1991.
