= Chambersburg and Bedford Turnpike Road Company Toll House =

Historic house in Pennsylvania, United States

- U.S. National Register of Historic Places
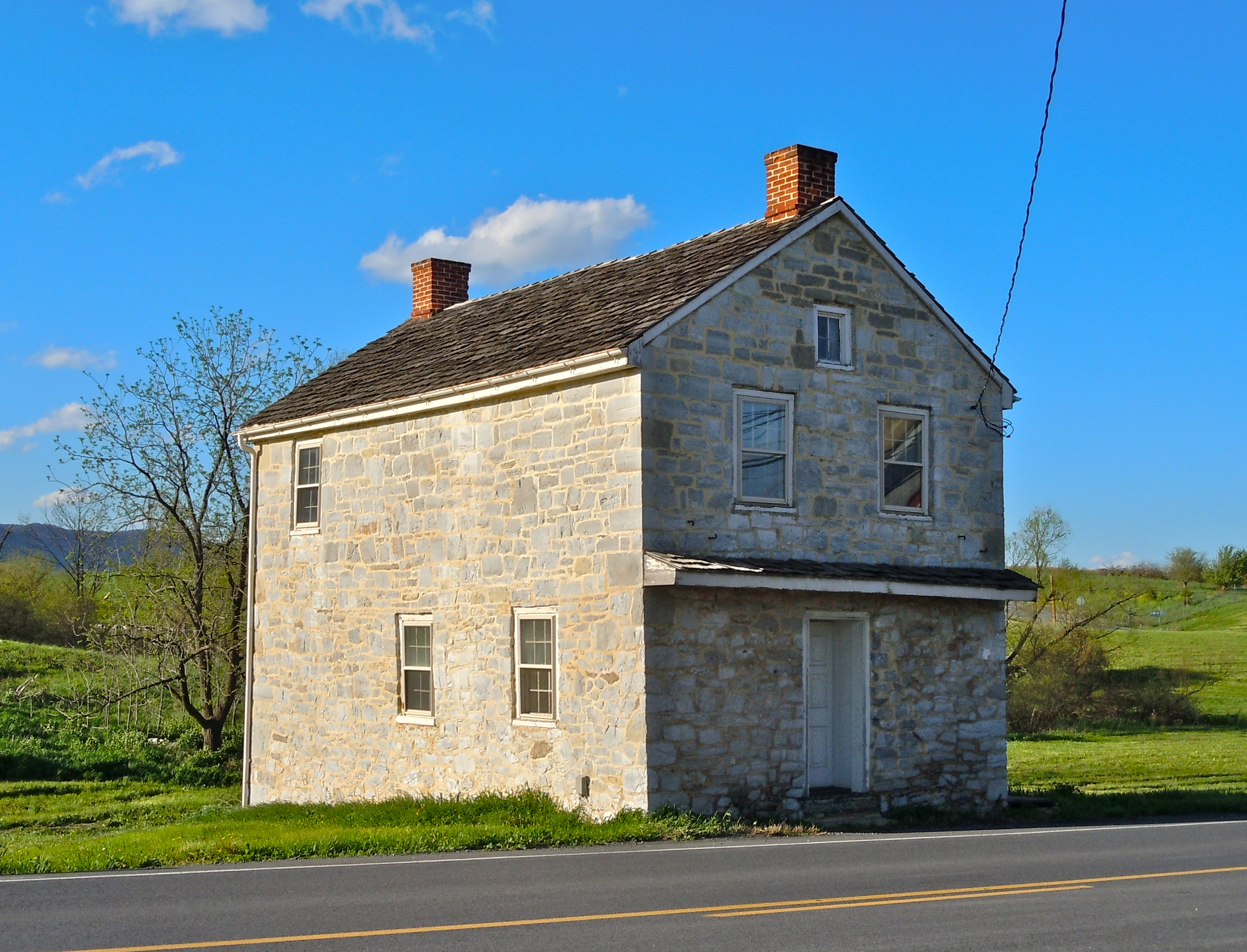
- Chambersburg and Bedford Turnpike Road Company Toll House, April 2011

- Location within Pennsylvania Location within the United States
- Location: West of St. Thomas on U.S. Route 30, St. Thomas Township, Pennsylvania
- Coordinates: 39°54′47″N 77°48′50″W
- Area: 0.3 acres (0.12 ha)
- Built: c. 1818
- Built by: Chambersburg & Bedford Turnpike Co.
- NRHP reference No.: 78002404
- Added to NRHP: January 3, 1978

Chambersburg and Bedford Turnpike Road Company Toll House is a historic toll house located at St. Thomas Township in Franklin County, Pennsylvania. It was built about 1818, and is a two-story, three-bay wide, limestone building. It was owned by the Chambersburg and Bedford Turnpike Road Company until, when it was sold for $60.00.

It was listed on the National Register of Historic Places in 1977.
