= Horse Valley Bridge =

- U.S. National Register of Historic Places
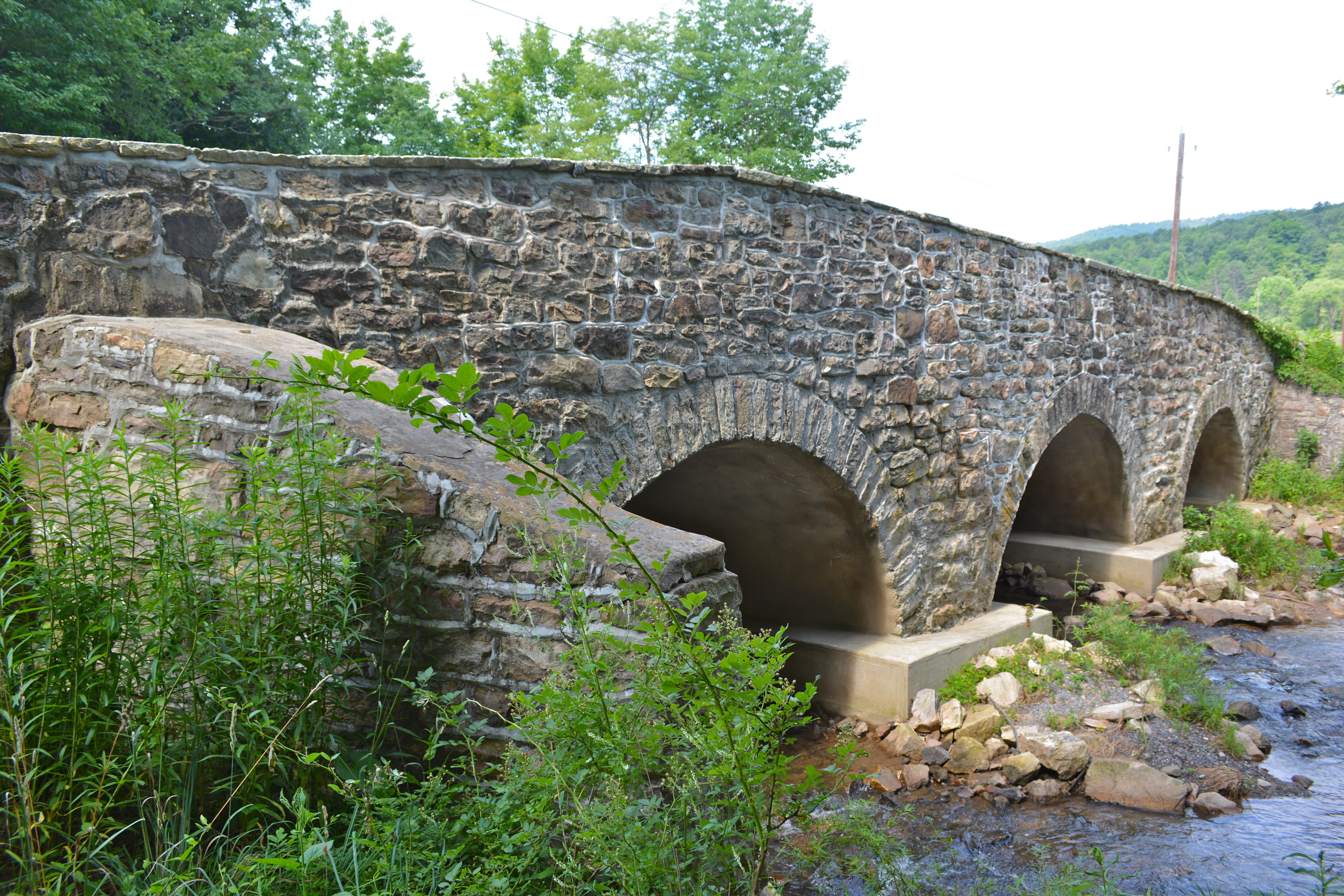

- Location within Pennsylvania Location within the United States
- Location: Legislative Route 28093 over Conodoguinet Creek near Upper Strasburg, Letterkenny Township, Pennsylvania
- Coordinates: 40°3′57″N 77°45′34″W
- Area: less than one acre
- Architectural style: Multi-span stone arch
- MPS: Highway Bridges Owned by the Commonwealth of Pennsylvania, Department of Transportation TR
- NRHP reference No.: 88000775
- Added to NRHP: June 22, 1988

The Horse Valley Bridge is an historic, multi-span, stone, arch bridge which is located in Letterkenny Township in Franklin County, Pennsylvania, United States.

It was listed on the National Register of Historic Places in 1988.

== History and architectural features ==
This historic American infrastructure element is a 75-foot-long (23 m), bridge with three spans, each of which measures 16-foot-long (4.9 m). It was erected before 1860, and crosses Conodoguinet Creek.

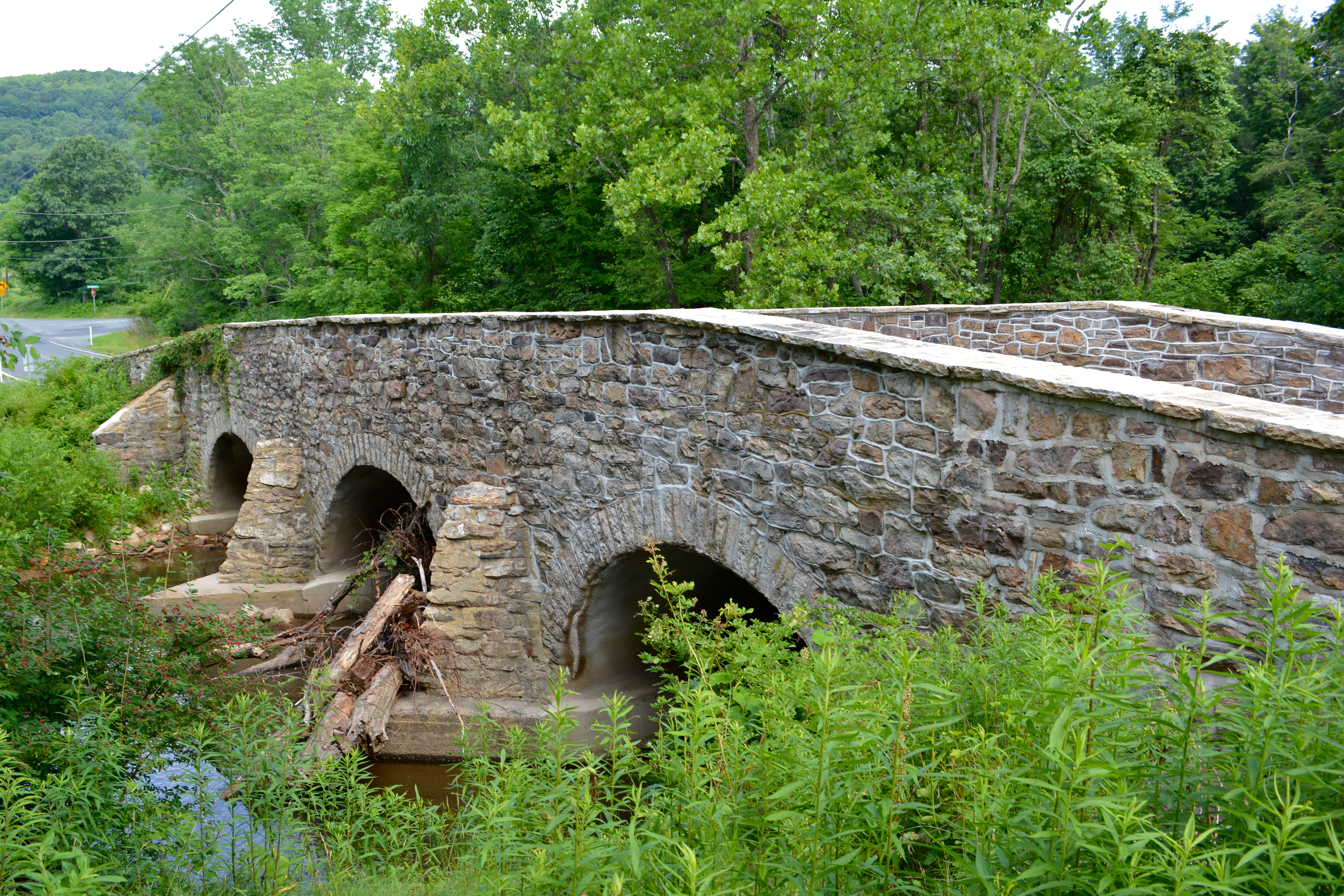
In 2014
