= Carrick Furnace =

- U.S. National Register of Historic Places
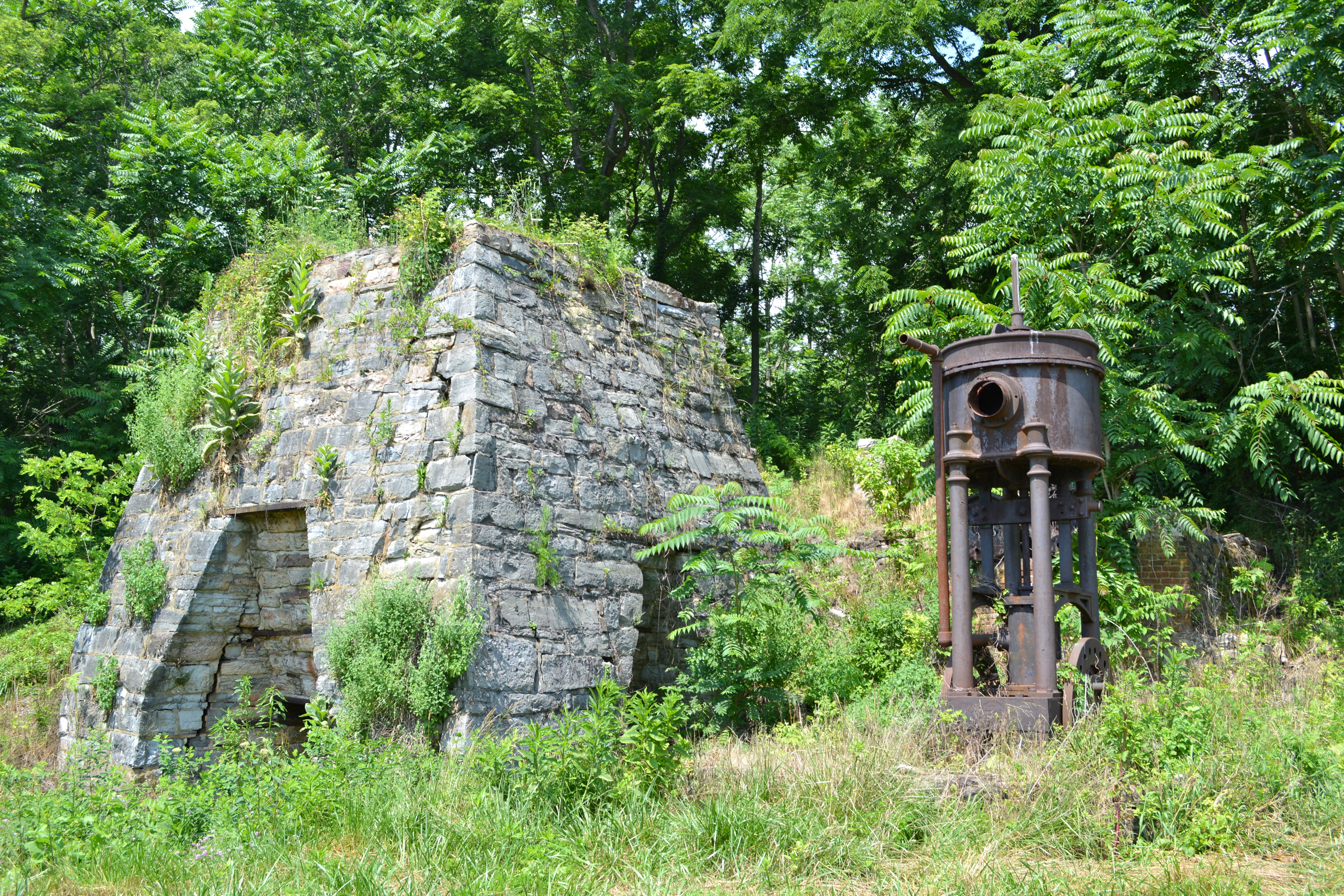

- Location within Pennsylvania Location within the United States
- Location: Pennsylvania Route 75 north of Metal, Metal Township, Pennsylvania
- Coordinates: 40°1′8″N 77°52′36″W
- Area: 1 acre (0.40 ha)
- Built: c. 1828
- Architectural style: Iron furnace
- MPS: Iron and Steel Resources of Pennsylvania MPS
- NRHP reference No.: 91001133
- Added to NRHP: September 6, 1991

Carrick Furnace is a historic iron furnace located at Metal Township in Franklin County, Pennsylvania. The property includes the limestone furnace stack, a Peter L. Weimer blowing engine (1879), boilers for the steam engine, and the charging ramp, engine house, and cast house foundations. The furnace was built in 1828 by General Samuel Dunn, and measures 30 feet square at the base and 30 feet high. Furnace operations were suspended in 1837, the property sold in 1843, then leased in 1850 to "Witherow and Walker." The furnace was converted in 1879 to a hot blast with the installation of the steam-powered blowing engine. The furnace went out of blast in 1884, and was donated to the Franklin County Historical Society-Kittochtinney in 1935. In February 2020, the Carrick Furnace was purchased by the Path Valley Historical Society.

It was listed on the National Register of Historic Places in 1991.
