= Skinner Tavern =

- U.S. National Register of Historic Places
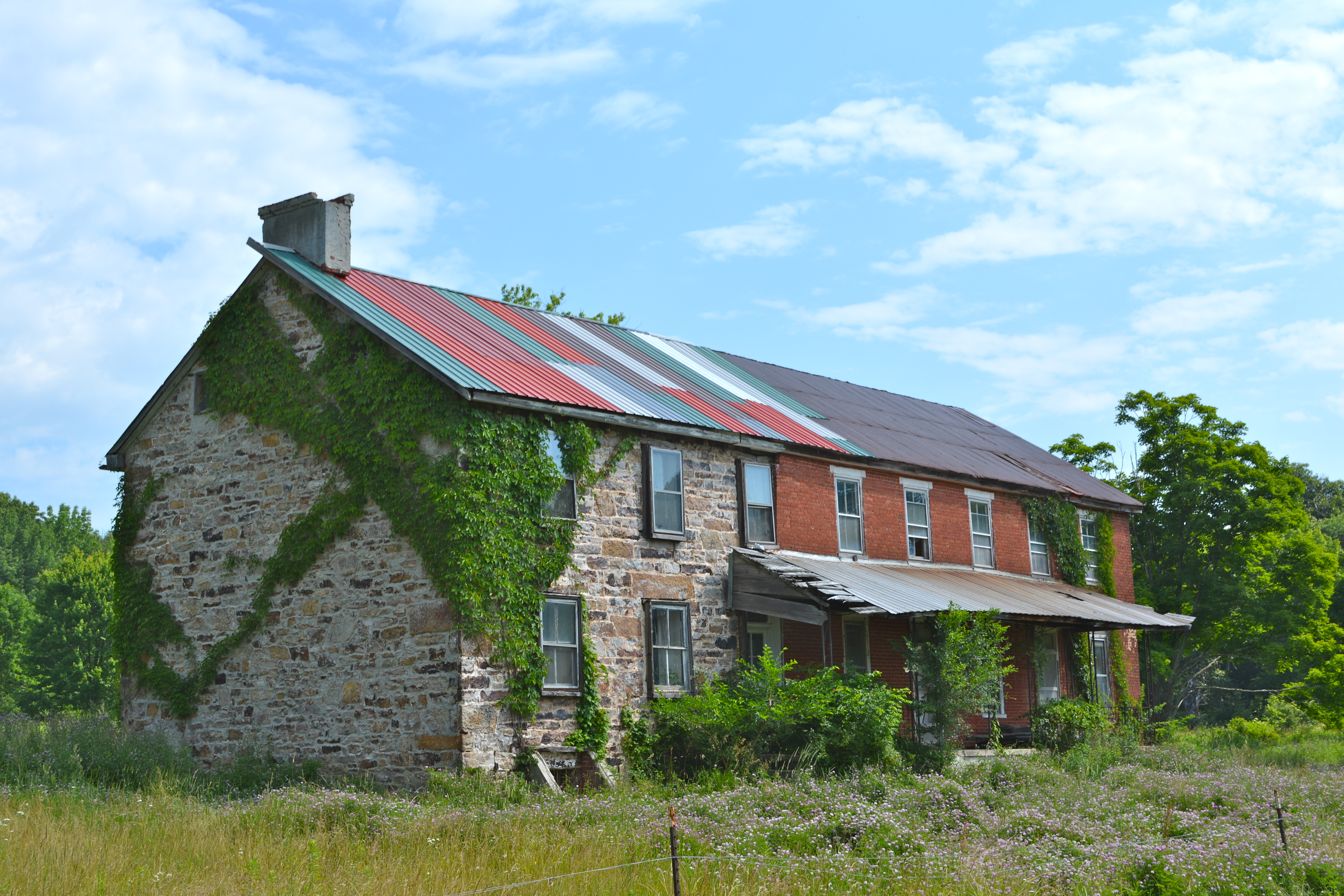

- Location within Pennsylvania Location within the United States
- Location: 13361 Upper Strasburg Rd., Letterkenny Township, Pennsylvania
- Coordinates: 40°4′7″N 77°45′53″W
- Area: less than one acre
- Built: 1788-1794, 1837-1850
- Architectural style: Georgian, Mid 19th Century Revival
- NRHP reference No.: 05000757
- Added to NRHP: July 27, 2005

Skinner Tavern, also known as Skinner's Inn, Halfway Hotel, Western Inn, and Geyer Hotel, is an historic inn and tavern that is located in Letterkenny Township in Franklin County, Pennsylvania. Its original section was built between 1788 and 1792.

It was listed on the National Register of Historic Places in 2005.

== History ==
In 1788, John Skinner, Sr. was awarded the contract to build the Three Mountain Road from the area now called Upper Strasburg to Burnt Cabins, completing the road sometime around 1790.

The original stone tavern was likely built by John Skinner Sr. in 1788. A short time later, he built a second tavern, also called Skinners, immediately to the south. By 1794, he had deeded the original tavern to his son George and deeded the second tavern to his son John Skinner Jr.

Sometime after October 21, 1794, President George Washington stayed at or travelled past "Skinners," while returning from Bedford to Philadelphia during the Whiskey Rebellion. As he wrote to Alexander Hamilton from Wright's Ferry on October 26, "thus far I have proceeded without accident to man, horse or Carriage, altho' the latter has had wherewith to try its goodness; especially in ascending the North Mountain from Skinners by a wrong road."

Sometime before 1800, the Three Mountain Road became an important part of the main road from Philadelphia to Pittsburgh, and thus an important path for travelers and settlers going west, and farmers bringing their produce east. During the "drover's era," which lasted until roughly 1850, large numbers of cattle and sheep moved east along the road and taverns were located about a mile apart on it.

During the 1863 Gettysburg campaign, a scouting party attached to the Army of Northern Virginia moved through the valley from Upper Strasburg while searching for any horses to conscript into Confederate service. While a number of horses were indeed hidden in the narrow valley, the search was unsuccessful. According to contemporary historian Jacob Hoke, this party passed on the road in front of Skinner Tavern, then known as the Western Inn and operated by a David Geyer.

== Architectural features ==
This historic structure is a two-and-one-half-story, three-bay, stone building that was designed in the Georgian-style with a five-bay, two-and-one-half-story, brick addition that was built between 1837 and 1850. The sections are unified by a gable roof.

The building, which measures seventy feet, six inches deep and twenty-seven feet, six inches wide, housed a general store and post office from 1888 to 1909, when it was converted to a private residence.

== Gallery ==
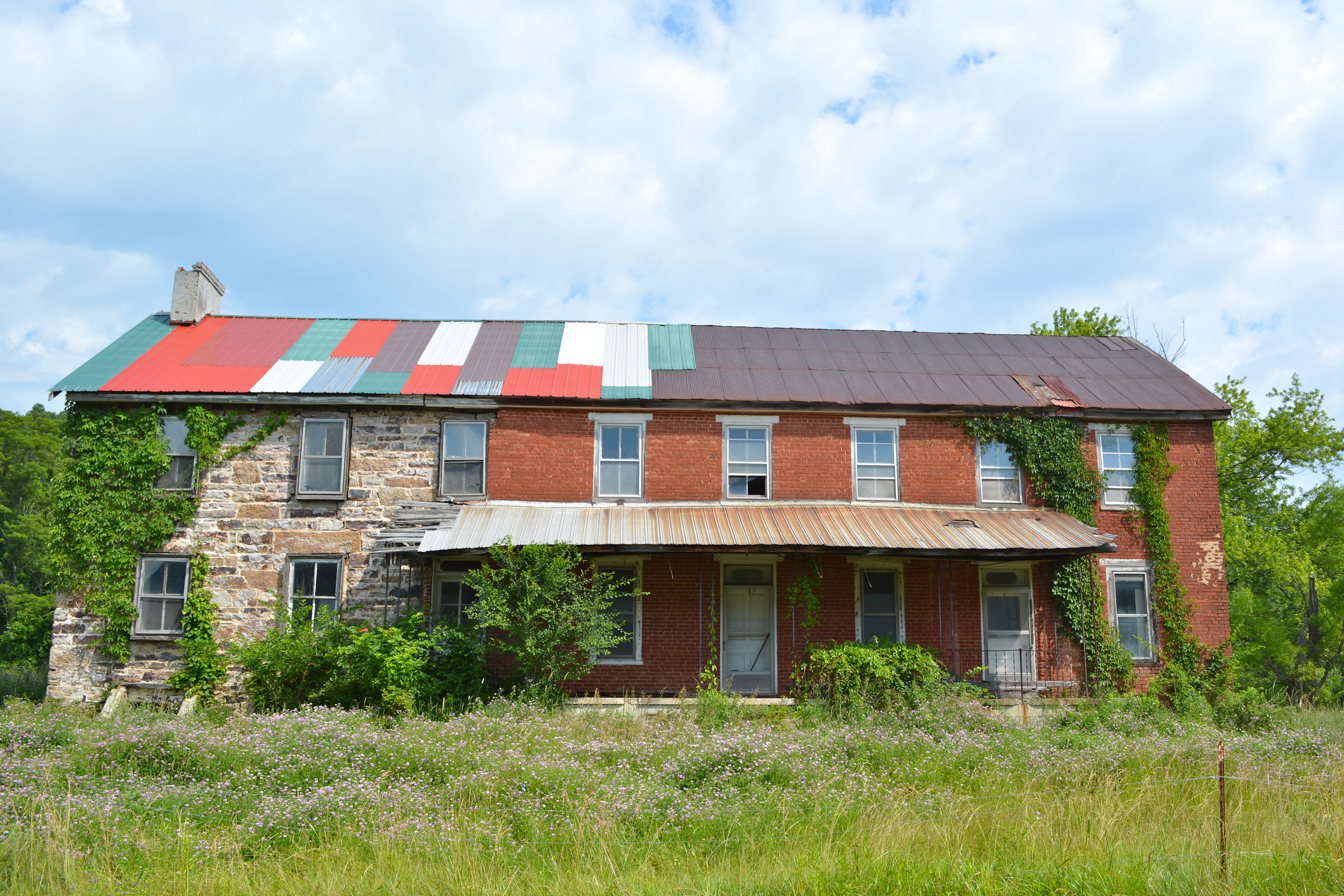
View from the east

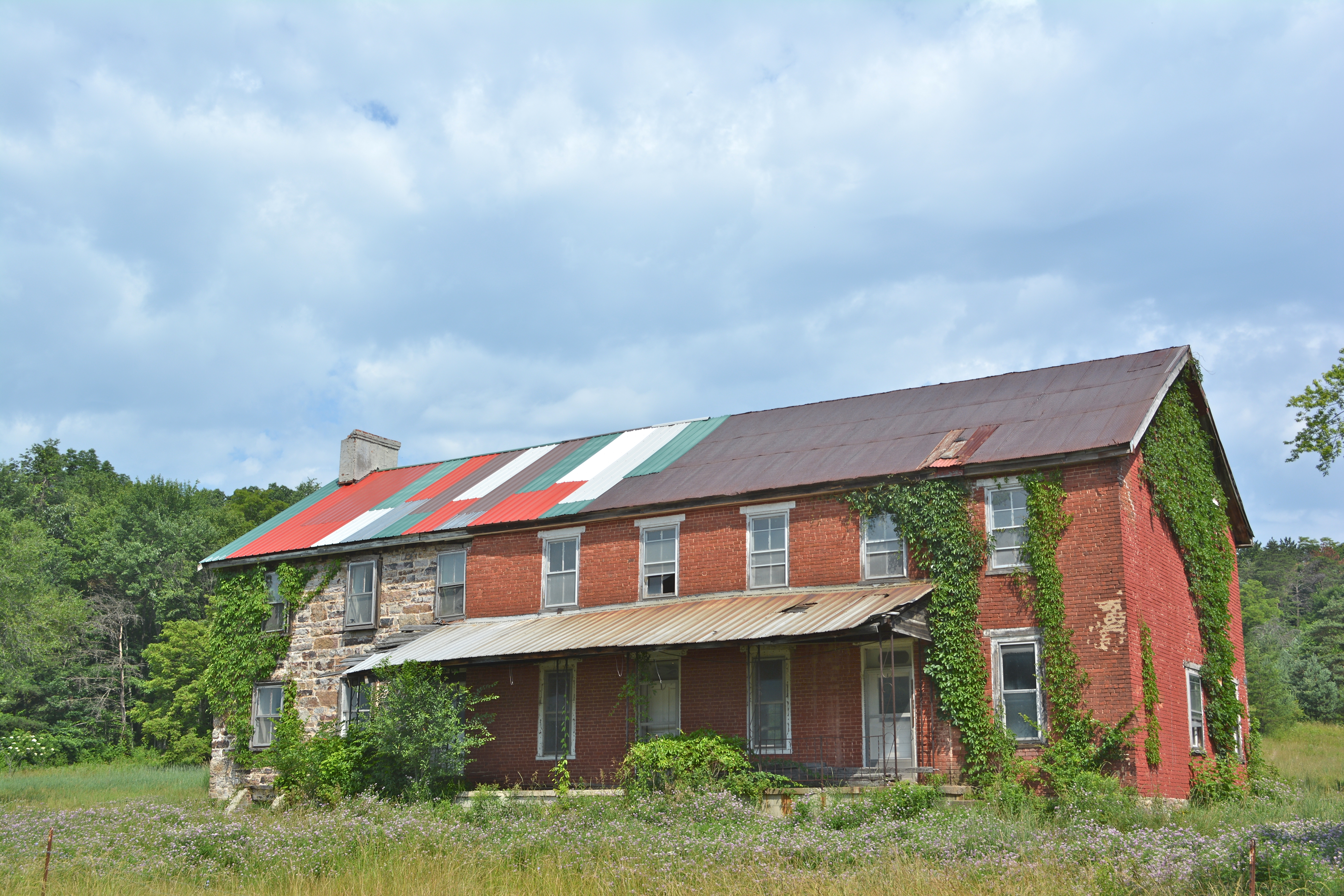
View from the northeast

== Additional Reading ==
- Foreman, Harry E. (1971). Conodoguinet Secrets – A History of Horse Valley, The Kerr Printing Co. (1971), ASIN: B01EBGPMP6
