= Mt. Pleasant Iron Works House =

Historic house in Pennsylvania, United States

- U.S. National Register of Historic Places
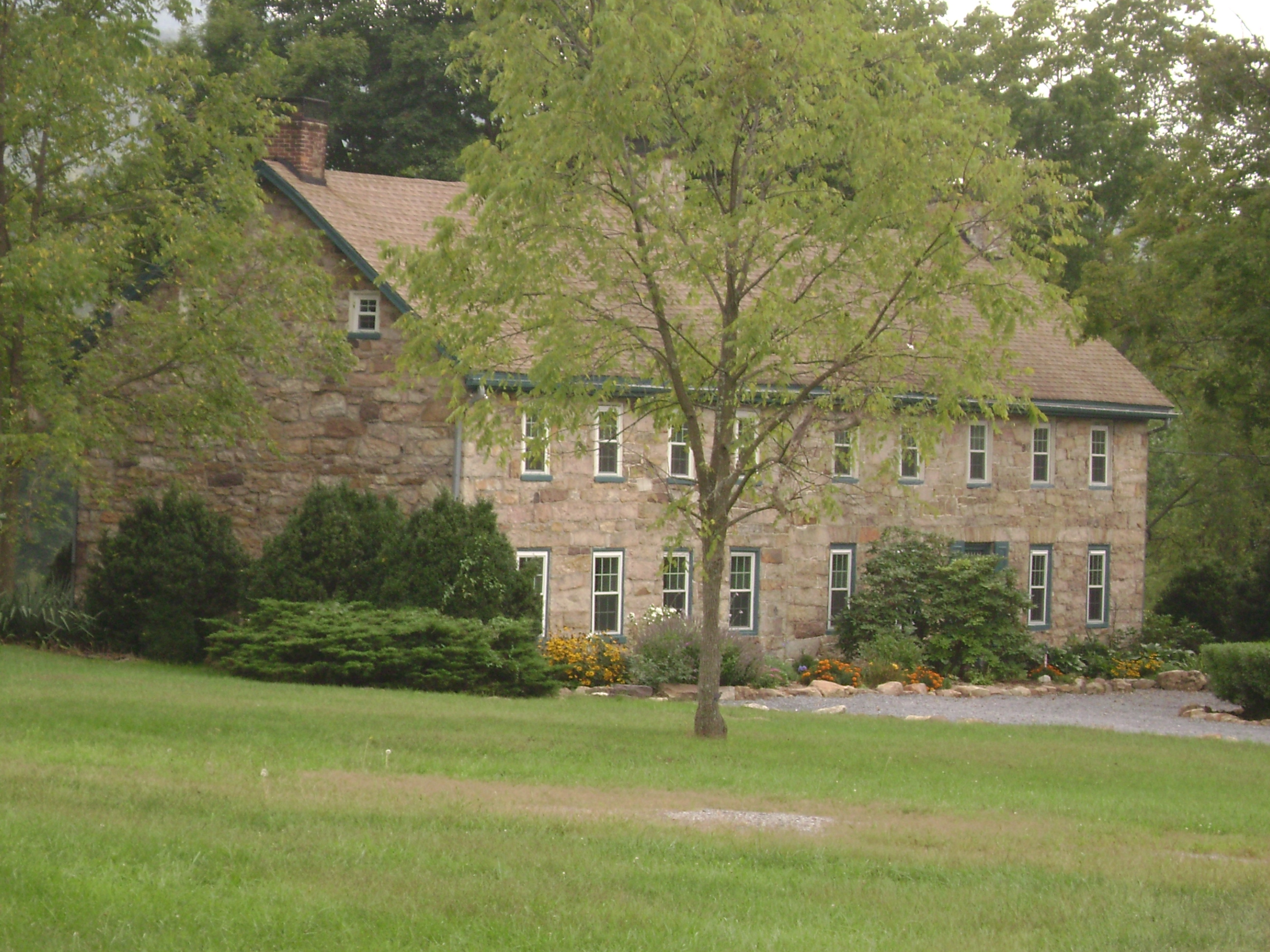
- Mt. Pleasant Iron Works House, September 2014

- Location within Pennsylvania Location within the United States
- Location: About 4 miles (6.4 km) north of Fort Loudon on Pennsylvania Route 75, Metal Township, Pennsylvania
- Coordinates: 39°57′53″N 77°53′58″W
- Area: 1 acre (0.40 ha)
- Built: 1800
- NRHP reference No.: 74001785
- Added to NRHP: December 31, 1974

The Mt. Pleasant Iron Works House, also known as Small House, is an historic home that is located in Metal Township in Franklin County, Pennsylvania, United States.

It was listed on the National Register of Historic Places in 1974.

== History and architectural features ==
Built circa 1800, this historic structure is a two-story, nine-bay, fieldstone dwelling with a gable roof. It measures forty-three feet wide by twenty-five feet deep. It was built on the Mt. Pleasant Iron Works property, established in 1783. The furnace closed in 1834, and forge ceased operation in 1843. Later in the nineteenth century, the Richmond Furnace opened on the property.
