= Letterkenny Township, Pennsylvania =

Township in Pennsylvania, US

Coordinates: 40°02′00″N 77°41′59″W

Letterkenny Township, Franklin County, Pennsylvania
- Township
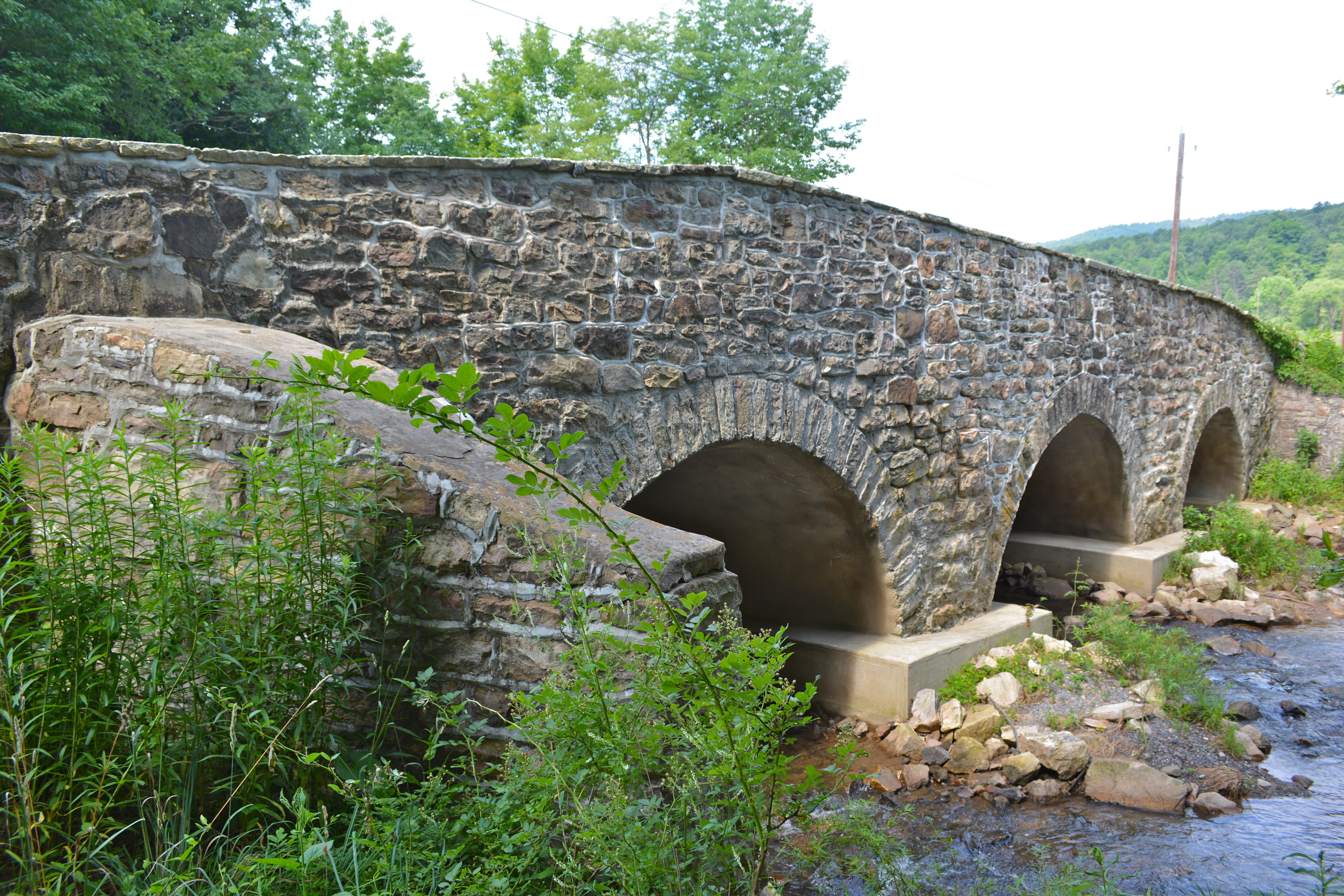
- Pre-Civil War Horse Valley Bridge

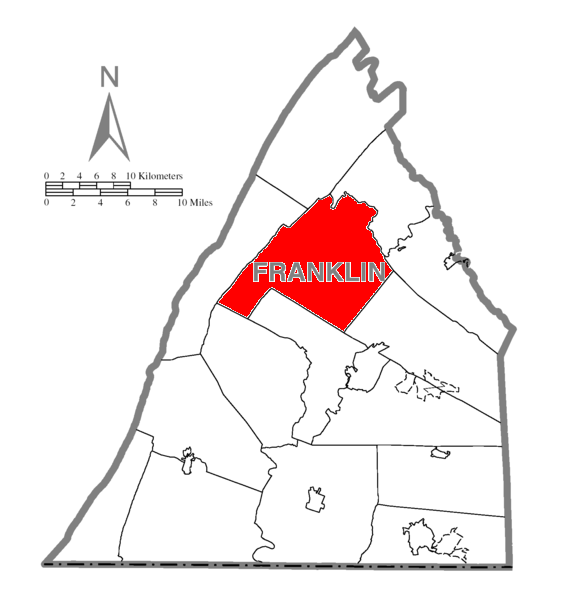
- Map of Franklin County, Pennsylvania highlighting Letterkenny Township

- Map of Franklin County, Pennsylvania
- Country: United States
- State: Pennsylvania
- County: Franklin
- Settled: 1736
- Incorporated: 1761

Area
  - Total: 70.51 sq mi (182.62 km^{2})
  - Land: 70.38 sq mi (182.28 km^{2})
  - Water: 0.14 sq mi (0.35 km^{2})

Population (2020)
  - Total: 2,462
  - Estimate (2016): 2,353
  - Density: 33.4/sq mi (12.91/km^{2})
- Time zone: UTC-5 (Eastern (EST))
  - Summer (DST): UTC-4 (EDT)
- Area code: 717
- FIPS code: 42-055-42888
- Website: letterkennytownship.org

Letterkenny Township is a township that is located in Franklin County, Pennsylvania, United States. The population was 2,462 at the time of the 2020 census, up from 2,074 at the 2000 census.

== History ==
The township is named after Letterkenny in County Donegal, Ireland. The Horse Valley Bridge, Rocky Spring Presbyterian Church, and Skinner Tavern are listed on the National Register of Historic Places.

== Geography ==
The township is located in north-central Franklin County. The eastern half of the township is situated in the Great Appalachian Valley, while the western half is occupied by the eastern two ridges of the Ridge-and-Valley Appalachians. Broad Mountain and Blue Mountain form the easternmost ridge, while Blue Mountain forms the western town border. Horse Valley is located between the two ridges, drained northeastward by Conodoguinet Creek, which turns and forms the northern boundary of the township as the creek leaves the mountains and enters the Great Appalachian Valley.

The southeastern part of the township falls within the Letterkenny Army Depot. The unincorporated communities of Upper Strasburg and Pleasant Hall are north of the depot.

According to the United States Census Bureau, the township has a total area of 70.5 square miles (182.6 km^{2}), of which 70.4 square miles (182.3 km^{2}) is land and 0.12 square miles (0.3 km^{2}), or 0.19%, is water.

=== Neighboring Townships ===
- Fannett Township (north)
- Greene Township (southeast)
- Hamilton Township (south)
- Lurgan Township (northeast)
- Metal Township (west)
- Southampton Township (east)
- St. Thomas Township (southwest)

== Communities ==
- Pleasant Hall
- Upper Strasburg

== Demographics ==
Historical population
Census	Pop.	Note	%±
2000	2,074		—
2010	2,318		11.8%
2020	2,462		6.2%
2016 (est.)	2,353		1.5%
U.S. Decennial Census

As of the census of 2000, there were 2,074 people, 783 households, and 617 families residing in the township.

The population density was 29.5 inhabitants per square mile (11.4/km^{2}). There were 829 housing units at an average density of 11.8/sq mi (4.6/km^{2}).

The racial makeup of the township was 98.07% White, 1.35% African American, 0.10% Native American, 0.10% Asian, 0.29% from other races, and 0.10% from two or more races. Hispanic or Latino of any race were 0.58% of the population.

There were 783 households, out of which 33.3% had children under the age of eighteen living with them; 67.8% were married couples living together, 5.9% had a female householder with no husband present, and 21.1% were non-families. 16.9% of all households were made up of individuals, and 6.8% had someone living alone who was ixty-five years of age or older.

The average household size was 2.65 and the average family size was 2.96.

Within the township, the population was spread out, with 24.5% of residents who were under the age of eighteen, 8.9% who were aged eighteen to twenty-four, 30.8% who were aged twenty-five to forty-four, 24.0% wo were aged forty-five to sixty-four, and 11.9% who were sixty-five years of age or older. The median age was thirty-seven years.

For every one hundred females, there were 105.6 males. For every one hundred females who were aged eighteen or older, there were 106.1 males.

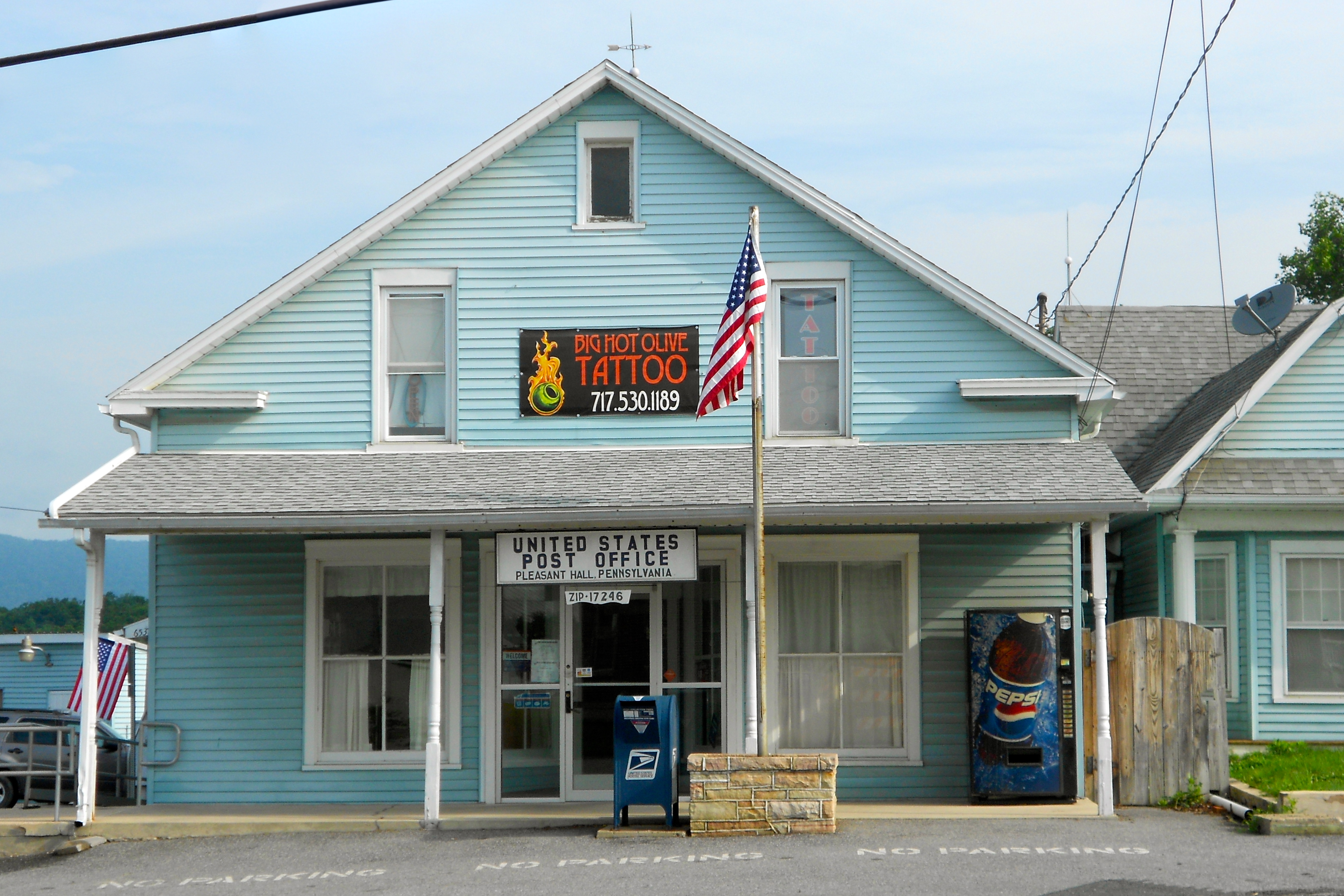
Pleasant Hall post office

The median income for a household in the township was $40,897, and the median income for a family was $44,545. Males had a median income of $30,431 compared with that of $21,875 for females.

The per capita income for the township was $18,315.

Approximately 1.8% of families and 4.7% of the population were living below the poverty line, including 7.3% of those who were under the age of eighteen and 5.3% of those who were aged sixty-five or older.

== In popular culture ==
Letterkenny Township is referenced in Season 9 Episode 7 of the Canadian TV Series Letterkenny, as the township shares its name with the show's titular town.
