= Fannettsburg, Pennsylvania =

Unincorporated community in Pennsylvania, US

Coordinates: 40°03′54″N 77°49′46″W

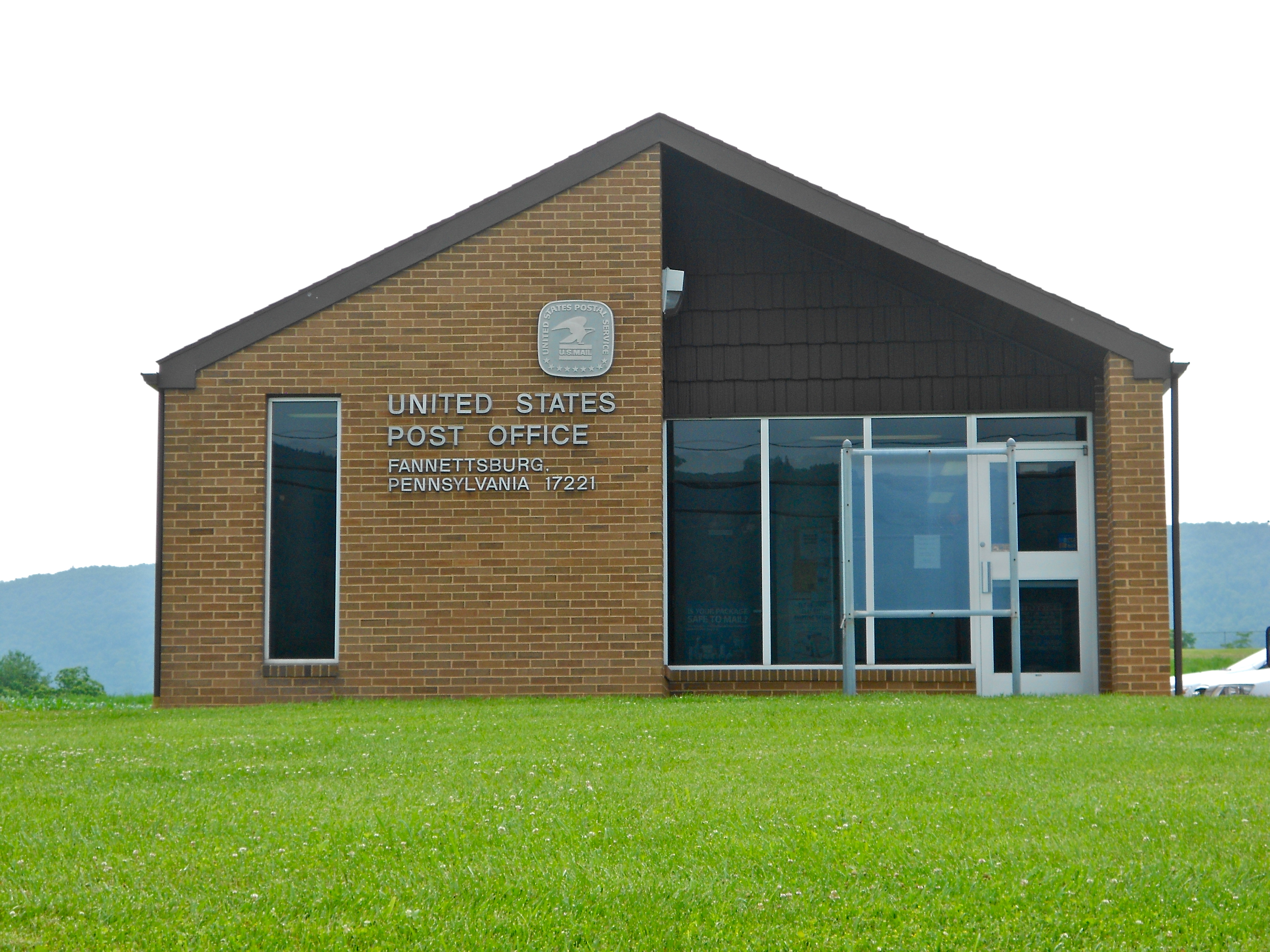
Fannettsburg post office

Fannettsburg is an unincorporated town that is located in Metal Township, Franklin County, Pennsylvania, United States.

It is situated approximately six miles south of Fannett Township, although it was named for the township and was once part of it.

== History and geography ==
Fannettsburg was platted in 1790, and named after Fannett Township. A post office named Fannettsburg was established in 1809. The town's name was spelled as Fannettburgh from 1827 until 1892, when it was changed back to Fannettsburg.

Fannettsburg's ZIP code, 17221, covers an area of 10.31 sq mi (26.7 km²) and has a population of 637. There are 316 housing units, 252 of which are occupied. However, the statistics on vacant housing units are misleading because they include a former campground with vacant mobile homes. As of 2021, there were only two vacant homes in the main part of town.

== Gallery ==
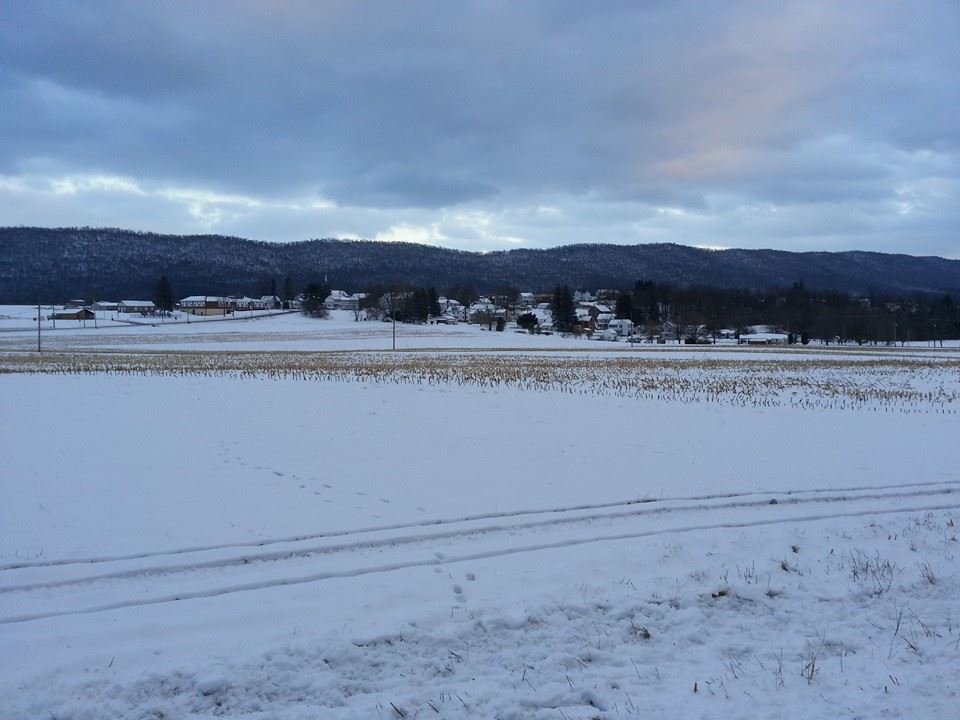
North of town, 2013

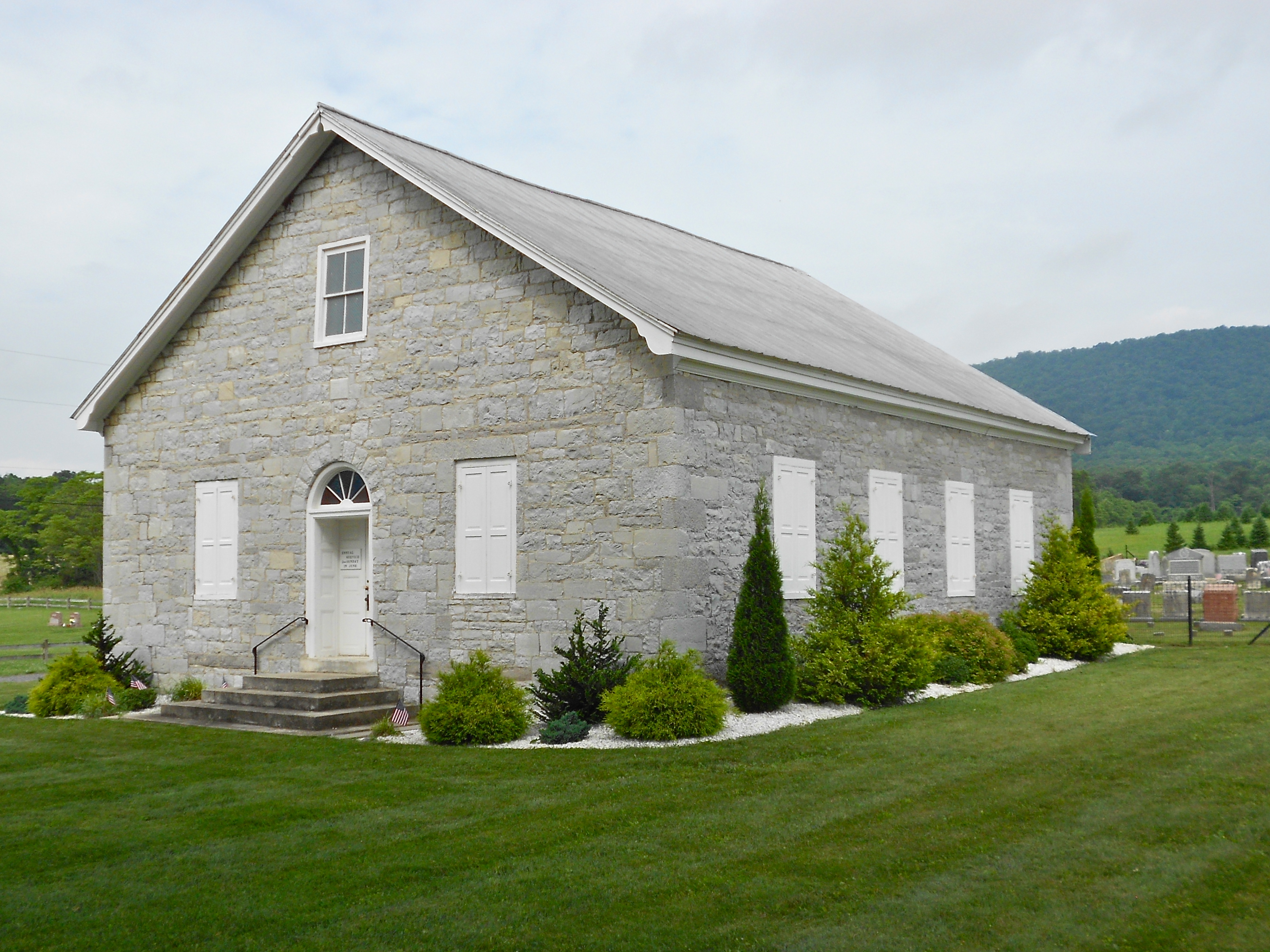
Fannettsburg Reformed Church, half a mile north of town, 2015

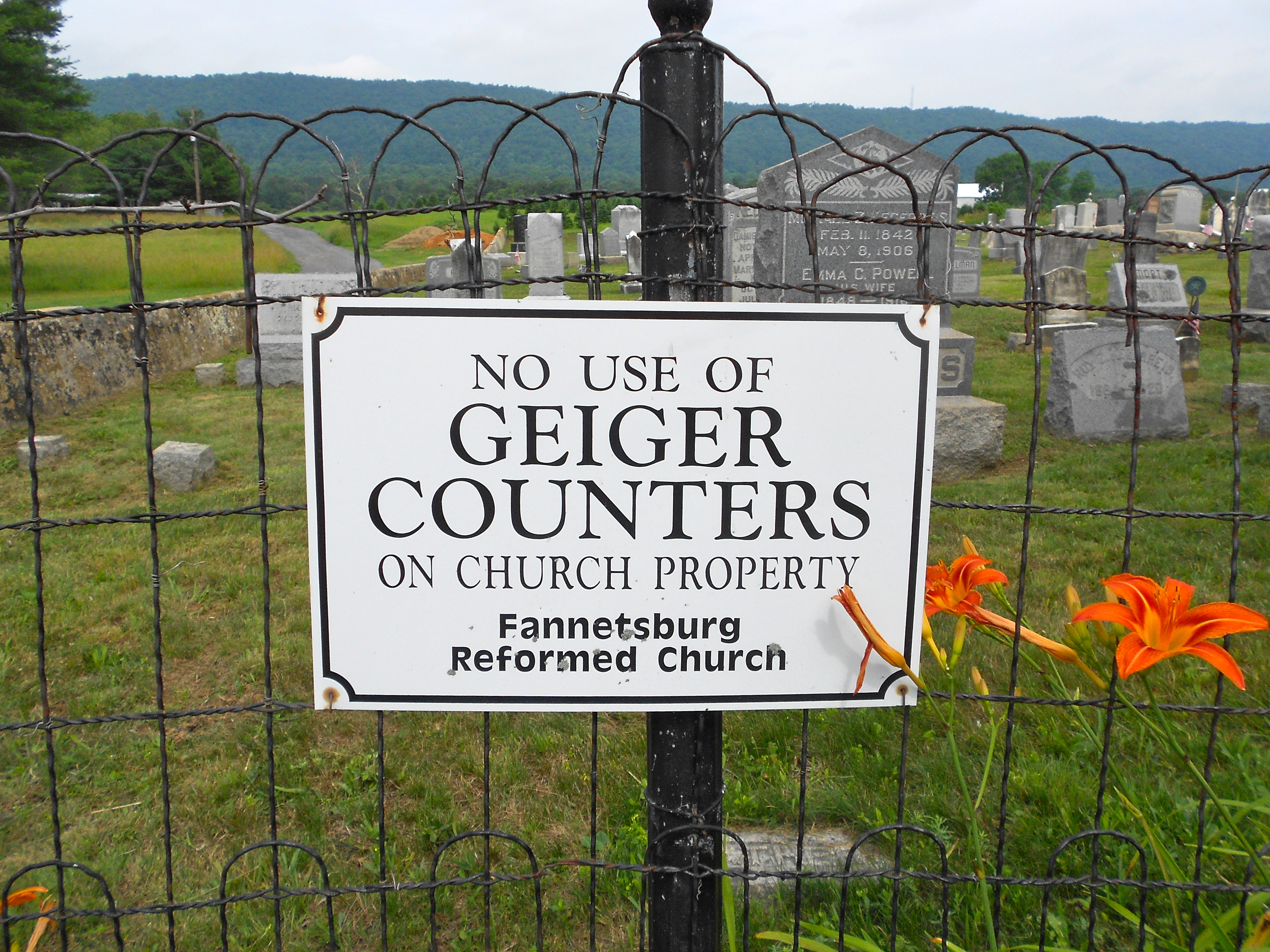
Church cemetery
