= Williamson, Pennsylvania =

Unincorporated community in Pennsylvania, US

- Unincorporated community
- Location within Pennsylvania Location within the United States
- Coordinates: 39°51′11″N 77°47′51″W
- Country: United States
- State: Pennsylvania
- County: Franklin
- Township: St. Thomas
- Elevation: 489 ft (149 m)
- Time zone: UTC-5 (Eastern (EST))
  - Summer (DST): UTC-4 (EDT)
- ZIP code: 17225
- Area code: 717
- GNIS feature ID: 1191484

Williamson is an unincorporated community in St. Thomas Township in Franklin County, Pennsylvania, United States. Williamson is located along Pennsylvania Route 995, northwest of Greencastle and southwest of Chambersburg.

Williamson was platted circa 1870 by land owner Samuel Z. Hawbaker, and may be named after Hugh Williamson, the patriot contemporary of Benjamin Franklin, both of whom were Founding Fathers of the United States. Another possibility is that the community is named after an unknown local denizen surnamed Williamson, perhaps an early postmaster of the local post office that has been in operation at Williamson since 1872.
