= Conococheague Creek =

Stream in the U.S. states of Pennsylvania and Maryland

Coordinates: 39°36′02″N 77°49′42″W

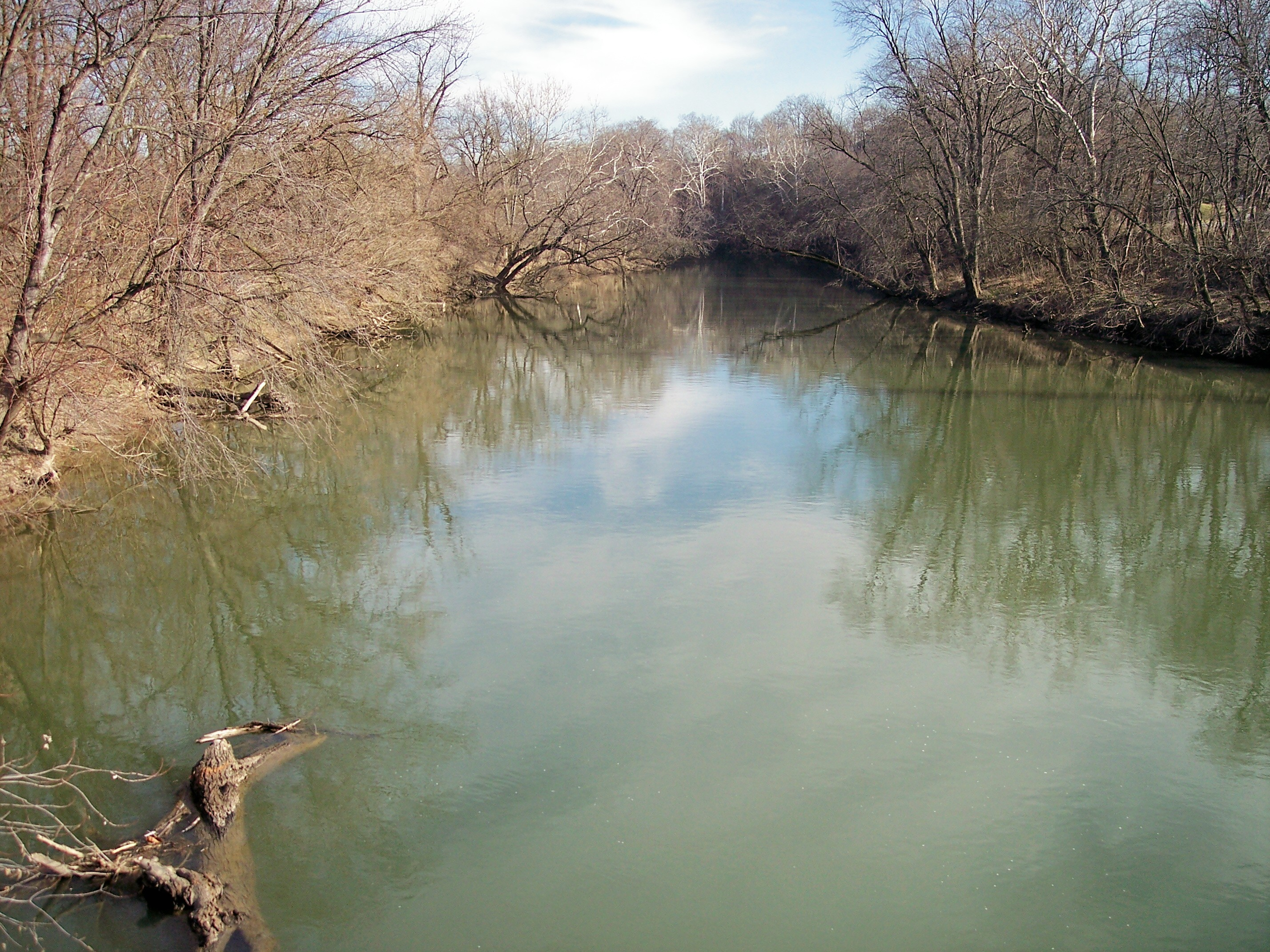
Conococheague Creek near its mouth in Williamsport, Maryland, as viewed upstream from an aqueduct on the towpath trail in the Chesapeake and Ohio Canal National Historical Park

Conococheague Creek, a tributary of the Potomac River, is a free-flowing stream that originates in Pennsylvania and empties into the Potomac River near Williamsport, Maryland. It is 80 miles (129 km) in length, with 57 miles (92 km) in Pennsylvania and 23 miles (37 km) in Maryland. The watershed of Conococheague Creek has an area of approximately 566 square miles (1,470 km^{2}), out of which only 65 square miles (170 km^{2}) (12% of the area) are in Maryland.

The word "Conococheague" is translated from the Delaware Indian or Unami-Lenapi term òk'chaxk'hanna, which means "many-turns-river." The Conococheague, or Connogochegue, as it was known at the time, was the northernmost extent of the range along the Potomac within which Congress in the Residence Bill of 1790 authorized the establishment of the Federal District, known as the District of Columbia. By presidential proclamation, George Washington placed the District at the lower end of the range, near the "Eastern Branch", later Anacostia River, which marked the southernmost extent of the Residence Bill's range.

The water divide between Conococheague Creek and Conodoguinet Creek is sometimes used as the boundary between the Hagerstown Valley and the Cumberland Valley.

== Main stem above the West Branch ==
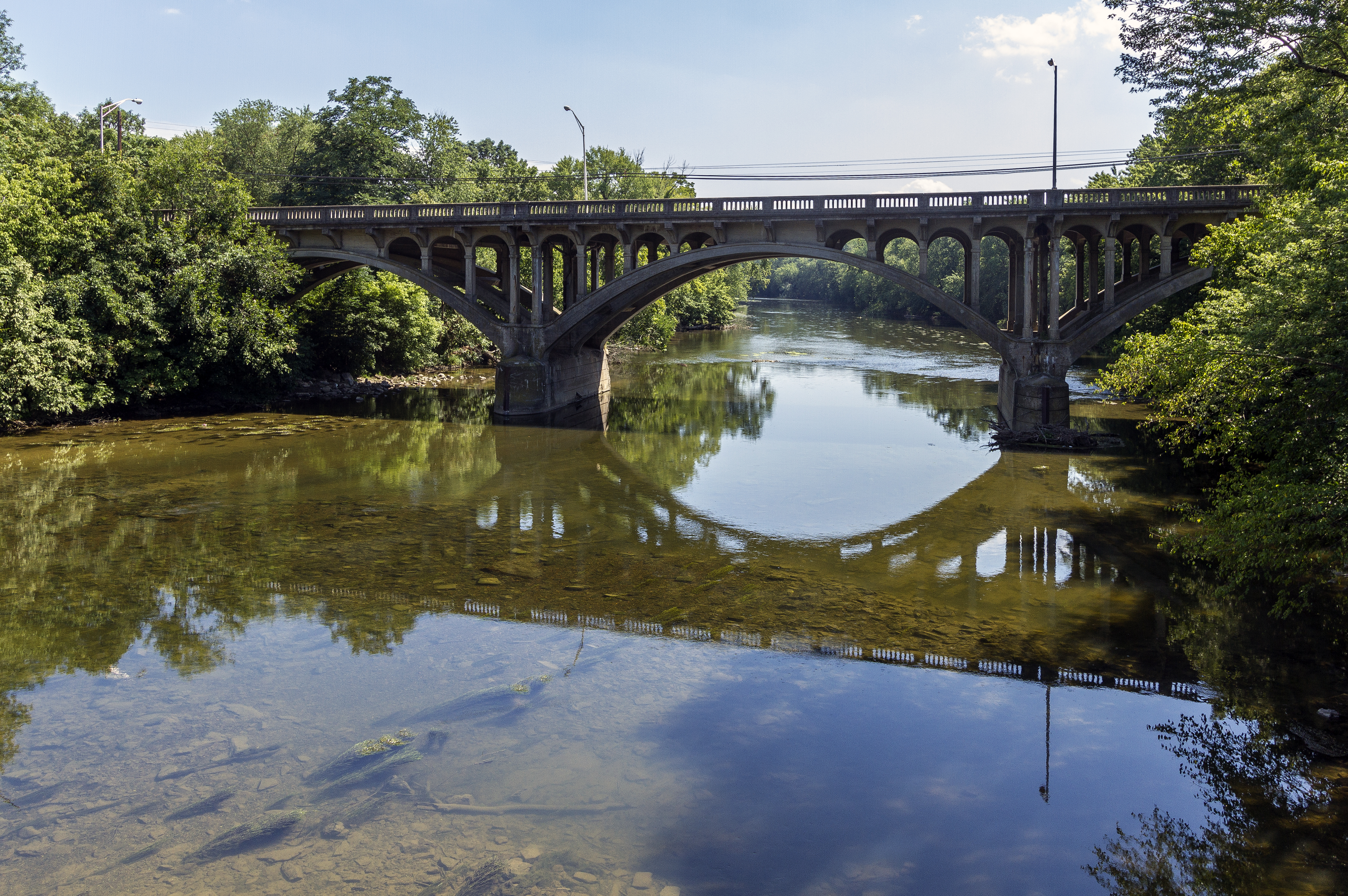
U.S. 40 bridge over Conococheague Creek from Wilson's Bridge

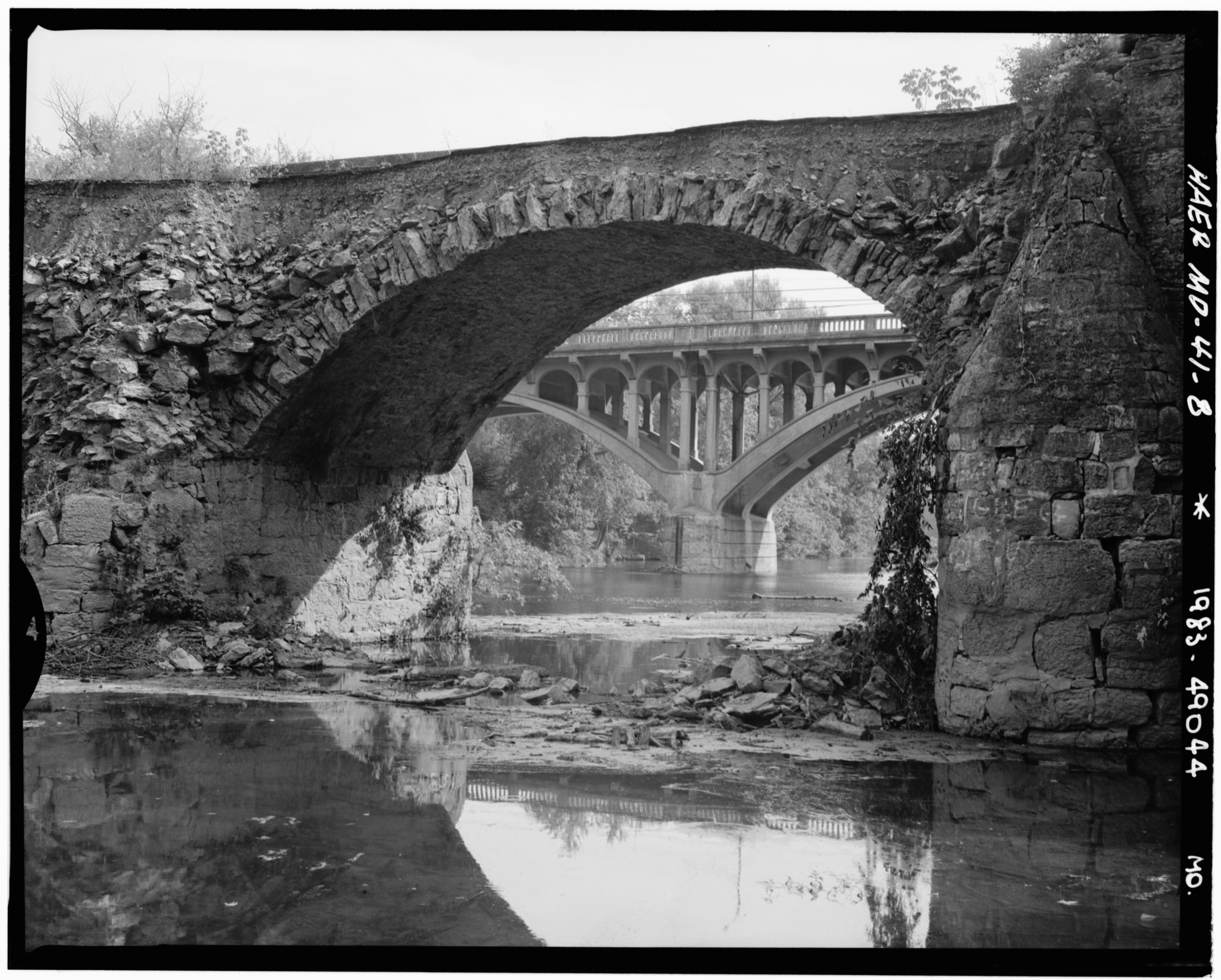
Wilson's Bridge, U.S. 40

Conococheague Creek, above its confluence with its West Branch, is sometimes referred to as the East Branch Conococheague Creek. At 53.1 miles (85.5 km), the "East Branch" is 7 miles (11 km) shorter than the West Branch. It rises in the South Mountain range of south-central Pennsylvania, forming in northwestern Adams County between East Big Flat Ridge and Piney Mountain. The creek flows southwest, turning west at Caledonia State Park, and continues past Fayetteville into the Great Appalachian Valley, turning southwest at Chambersburg and flowing west of Greencastle.

The creek from Fayetteville to its confluence with Back Creek near Williamson is very polluted from farm runoff. Over the past 30 years there has been a steady decline in the number of available native fish species, such as yellow perch, eel, horned chub, calico bass, rock bass, and white sucker, and overall water quality due to sediment collection on the bottom, thereby severely limiting the ability of these native species to spawn. This in turn has made parts of the lower East Branch ideal for catching huge crayfish at night; however, the food value of this species, due to pollution, is dubious at best.

== West Branch Conococheague Creek ==
The West Branch Conococheague Creek flows for 60.0 miles (96.6 km), almost the entire length of western Franklin County, before joining the main branch near the borough of Greencastle. The West Branch is the more pure of the two, owing mostly to the fact that a large portion of it runs through wilderness, making for very fine smallmouth bass, warmouth and rock bass fishing. However, there are a few small sewage treatment plants on the lower West Branch, starting at Fort Loudon, that make the lower West Branch less hospitable to native species' spawning. Northern pike and pickerel have been caught in the creek.

The West Branch flows southwest along the Tuscarora Trail to around Fort Loudon, then turns south, and finally southeast, joining the main stem 8.2 kilometres (5.1 mi) north of the Mason–Dixon line.

The Bridge in Metal Township crosses the West Branch Conococheague Creek at Metal Township in Franklin County, Pennsylvania. It was listed on the National Register of Historic Places in 1988.

== Main stem below the West Branch ==
Conococheague Creek continues south into Maryland and enters the Potomac near Williamsport, where the Great Philadelphia Wagon Road crossed the river at William's Ferry, continuing on to Winchester, Virginia. The crossing is where Braddock's forces crossed the Potomac after leaving Frederick on their way to Winchester. The Tuscarora Trail crosses the Conococheague.

== See also ==
- List of Maryland rivers
- List of rivers of Pennsylvania
