= List of places in Pennsylvania: La–Ll =

This list of cities, towns, unincorporated communities, counties, and other recognized places in the U.S. state of Pennsylvania also includes information on the number and names of counties in which the place lies, and its lower and upper Zip Code bounds, if applicable.

Name of place	Number of counties	Principal county	Lower zip code	Upper zip code
La Anna	1	Pike County	18326	
La Belle	1	Fayette County	15450	
La Gonda	1	Washington County	15301	
La Jose	1	Clearfield County	15753	
La Mont	1	Elk County		
La Mott	1	Montgomery County	19117	
La Plume	1	Lackawanna County	18440	
La Plume Township	1	Lackawanna County		
La Trappe	1	Bucks County		
Laboratory	1	Washington County	15301	
Laborde	1	Clearfield County		
Labott	1	York County	17364	
Lacey Park	1	Bucks County	18974	
Laceyville	1	Wyoming County	18623	
Lack Township	1	Juniata County		
Lackawannock Township	1	Mercer County		
Lackawaxen	1	Pike County	18435	
Lackawaxen Township	1	Pike County		
Laddsburg	1	Bradford County	18833	
Ladona	1	Potter County	16915	
Lafayette	1	McKean County	16738	
Lafayette Hill	1	Montgomery County	19444	
Lafayette Park	1	Montgomery County	19444	
Lafayette Township	1	McKean County		
Lafayetteville	1	Bedford County		
Lafferty Hill	1	Allegheny County	15227	
Laflin	1	Luzerne County	18702	
Lahaska	1	Bucks County	18931	18938
Laidig	1	Fulton County		
Laings Garden	1	Bucks County	19007	
Laird	1	Armstrong County	16262	
Lairdsville	1	Lycoming County	17742	
Lake Ariel	1	Wayne County	18436	
Lake Carey	1	Wyoming County	18657	
Lake City	1	Elk County		
Lake City	1	Erie County	16423	
Lake Como	1	Wayne County	18437	
Lake Denise	1	Westmoreland County		
Lake Harmony	1	Carbon County	18624	
Lake Hauto	2	Carbon County	18240	
Lake Hauto	2	Schuylkill County		
Lake Heritage	1	Adams County		
Lake Lynn	1	Fayette County	15451	
Lake Meade	1	Adams County		
Lake Naomi Estates	1	Monroe County		
Lake Pleasant	1	Erie County	16438	
Lake Sheridan	2	Lackawanna County	18446	
Lake Sheridan	2	Wyoming County	18446	
Lake Township	1	Luzerne County		
Lake Township	1	Mercer County		
Lake Township	1	Wayne County		
Lake Wallenpaupack Estates	1	Pike County		
Lake Winola	1	Wyoming County	18625	
Lake Wynonah	1	Schuylkill County		
Lakemont	1	Blair County	16602	
Lakeside	1	Bucks County		
Lakeside	1	Susquehanna County	18834	
Laketon	1	Luzerne County	18618	
Laketon Heights	1	Allegheny County	15235	
Lakeview	1	Susquehanna County	18847	
Lakeview Heights	1	Dauphin County	17111	
Lakeville	1	Wayne County	18438	
Lakewood	1	Erie County	16505	
Lakewood	1	Wayne County	18439	
Lamar	1	Clinton County	16848	
Lamar Township	1	Clinton County		
Lamartine	1	Clarion County	16375	
Lambert	1	Fayette County	15458	
Lamberton	1	Fayette County	15458	
Lambertsville	1	Somerset County	15563	
Lambs Creek	1	Tioga County	16933	
Lamokin Street	1	Delaware County		
Lamokin Village	1	Delaware County	19013	
Lamonaville	1	Forest County		
Lamonts Corners	1	Mercer County		
Lampeter	1	Lancaster County	17537	
Lanark	1	Lehigh County	18034	
Lancaster	1	Lancaster County	17601	08
Lancaster Junction	1	Lancaster County	17545	
Lancaster Township	1	Butler County		
Lancaster Township	1	Lancaster County		
Lancasterville	1	Montgomery County		
Landenberg	1	Chester County	19350	
Lander	1	Warren County	16345	
Landingville	1	Schuylkill County	17942	
Landis Farms	1	Lancaster County	17601	
Landis Store	1	Berks County	19512	
Landis Valley	1	Lancaster County	17604	
Landisburg	1	Perry County	17040	
Landisville	1	Bucks County		
Landisville	1	Lancaster County	17538	
Landon Station	1	Fayette County		
Landreth Manor	1	Bucks County	19007	
Landrus	1	Tioga County		
Landstreet	1	Somerset County	15935	
Lane	1	Armstrong County	16229	
Lanes Mills	1	Jefferson County	15824	
Lanesboro	1	Susquehanna County	18827	
Laneville	1	Armstrong County		
Langdon	1	Erie County		
Langdon	1	Luzerne County		
Langdon	1	Lycoming County	17763	
Langdondale	1	Bedford County	16650	
Langeloth	1	Washington County	15054	
Langford Hills	1	Delaware County	19008	
Langhorne	1	Bucks County	19047	
Langhorne Gables	1	Bucks County	19047	
Langhorne Gardens	1	Bucks County	19047	
Langhorne Manor	1	Bucks County	19047	
Langhorne Terrace	1	Bucks County	19047	
Langville	1	Jefferson County		
Lansdale	1	Montgomery County	19446	
Lansdowne	1	Delaware County	19050	
Lansdowne Park Gardens	1	Delaware County	19023	
Lanse	1	Clearfield County	16849	
Lansford	1	Carbon County	18232	
Lantz	1	Northumberland County		
Lantz Corners	1	McKean County	16740	
Lapark	1	Lancaster County	17562	
Lapidea Hills	1	Delaware County	19086	
Laporte	1	Sullivan County	18626	
Laporte Township	1	Sullivan County		
Laquin	1	Bradford County		
Larabee	1	McKean County	16731	
Larchmont	1	Delaware County	19073	
Larchmont Square	1	Delaware County	19073	
Lardintown	1	Butler County	16055	
Large	1	Allegheny County	15025	
Larimer	1	Westmoreland County	15647	
Larimer Township	1	Somerset County		
Larke	1	Blair County		
Larkin Corner	1	Delaware County	19062	
Larkin Knoll	1	Delaware County	19061	
Larkins Corner	1	Delaware County	19061	
Larksville	1	Luzerne County	18704	
Larrys Creek	1	Lycoming County	17740	
Larryville	1	Lycoming County	17740	
Larue	1	York County	17327	
Lash	1	Westmoreland County		
Lashley	1	Fulton County	17267	
Lathrop Township	1	Susquehanna County		
Latimore	1	Adams County	17372	
Latimore Township	1	Adams County		
Latrobe	1	Westmoreland County	15650	
Latta Grove	1	Huntingdon County		
Lattimer	1	Luzerne County		
Lattimer Mines	1	Luzerne County	18234	
Laubachs	1	Columbia County	17814	
Lauffer	1	Westmoreland County		
Laughlin Corner	1	Beaver County	15043	
Laughlin Junction	1	Allegheny County		
Laughlintown	1	Westmoreland County	15655	
Laurel	1	Chester County		
Laurel	1	Cumberland County	17324	
Laurel	1	York County	17322	
Laurel Bend	1	Bucks County	19007	
Laurel Falls	1	Somerset County		
Laurel Gardens	1	Allegheny County	15229	
Laurel Gardens	1	Luzerne County	18201	
Laurel Grove	1	Franklin County		
Laurel Hill	1	Fayette County	15431	
Laurel Hill	1	Lancaster County		
Laurel Hill	1	Philadelphia County		
Laurel Hill	1	Washington County	15057	
Laurel Junction	1	Schuylkill County		
Laurel Lake	1	Susquehanna County	18812	
Laurel Mount Boro	1	Westmoreland County	15601	
Laurel Mountain	1	Westmoreland County	15655	
Laurel Mountain Village	1	Somerset County		
Laurel Park	1	Union County	17845	
Laurel Run	1	Luzerne County	18702	
Laurel Summit	1	Somerset County		
Laureldale	1	Berks County	19605	
Laurella	1	Wayne County		
Laurelton	1	Union County	17835	
Laurelville	1	Fayette County	15666	
Laurelville	1	Lancaster County	17557	
Laurys Station	1	Lehigh County	18059	
Lausanne Township	1	Carbon County		
Lavansville	1	Somerset County	15501	
Lavelle	1	Schuylkill County	17943	
Laverock	1	Montgomery County	19118	
Lavery	1	Erie County		
Lawn	1	Lebanon County	17041	
Lawndale	1	Philadelphia County	19111	
Lawnton	1	Dauphin County	17111	
Lawrence	1	Washington County	15055	
Lawrence Corners	1	Tioga County		
Lawrence Junction	1	Lawrence County		
Lawrence Park	1	Delaware County	19008	
Lawrence Park	1	Erie County	16511	
Lawrence Park Township	1	Erie County		
Lawrence Township	1	Clearfield County		
Lawrence Township	1	Tioga County		
Lawrenceville	1	Allegheny County		
Lawrenceville	1	Lackawanna County	18642	
Lawrenceville	1	Tioga County	16929	
Lawson Heights	1	Westmoreland County	15650	
Lawsonham	1	Clarion County	16248	
Lawsville Center	1	Susquehanna County	18801	
Lawton	1	Susquehanna County	18828	
Layfield	1	Montgomery County	19525	
Layton	1	Fayette County	15473	
Le Boeuf Gardens	1	Erie County	16441	
Le Raysville	1	Bradford County	18829	
Leacock	1	Lancaster County	17540	
Leacock-Leola-Bareville	1	Lancaster County		
Leacock Township	1	Lancaster County		
Leaders Heights	1	York County	17403	
Leaf Park	1	Lancaster County	17603	
League Island	1	Philadelphia County		
Leak Run	1	Allegheny County	15146	
Leaman Place	1	Lancaster County	17562	
Leaman Place Junction	1	Lancaster County		
Leamersville	1	Blair County	16635	
Learn Settlement	1	Indiana County		
Leasuresville	1	Butler County	16055	
Leather Corner Post	1	Lehigh County	18069	
Leatherwood	1	Clarion County	16242	
Lebanon	1	Lebanon County	17042	
Lebanon Church	1	Allegheny County	15122	
Lebanon South	1	Lebanon County	17042	
Lebanon Township	1	Wayne County		
Lebo	1	Perry County	17040	
Le Boeuf Township	1	Erie County		
Lebo Vista	1	Lycoming County		
Leck Kill	1	Northumberland County	17836	
Leckrone	1	Fayette County	15454	
Lecontes Mills	1	Clearfield County	16850	
Lederach	1	Montgomery County	19450	
Ledgedale	1	Wayne County	18463	
Ledger	1	Lancaster County		
Ledy	1	Franklin County		
Lee	1	Luzerne County	18617	
Lee Mine	1	Luzerne County	18634	
Lee Park	1	Luzerne County	18702	
Leechburg	1	Allegheny County		
Leechburg	1	Armstrong County	15656	
Leechs Corners	1	Mercer County		
Leedon Estates	1	Delaware County	19078	
Leedon Gardens	1	Delaware County	19078	
Leeper	1	Clarion County	16233	
Lees Cross Roads	1	Cumberland County	17257	
Lees Mill	1	Chester County		
Leesburg	1	Mercer County	16156	
Leesburg Station	1	Mercer County		
Leesport	1	Berks County	19533	
Leet Township	1	Allegheny County		
Leetonia	1	Tioga County	17727	
Leetsdale	1	Allegheny County	15056	
Lehigh	1	Lackawanna County	18424	
Lehigh Furnace	1	Lehigh County	18080	
Lehigh Gap	1	Carbon County		
Lehigh Gap	1	Lehigh County	18080	
Lehigh Tannery	1	Carbon County		
Lehigh Township	1	Carbon County		
Lehigh Township	1	Lackawanna County		
Lehigh Township	1	Northampton County		
Lehigh Township	1	Wayne County		
Lehigh University	1	Northampton County	18015	
Lehigh Valley	1	Lehigh County	18001	
Lehigh Valley Facility	1	Lehigh County	18001	
Lehighton	1	Carbon County	18235	
Lehman	1	Luzerne County	18627	
Lehman	1	York County	17362	
Lehman Township	1	Luzerne County		
Lehman Township	1	Pike County		
Lehmasters	1	Franklin County		
Leibeyville	1	Schuylkill County	17960	
Leidighs	1	Cumberland County		
Leidy	1	Clinton County	17764	
Leidy Township	1	Clinton County		
Leidytown	1	Bucks County		
Leinbachs	1	Berks County	19605	
Leiperville	1	Delaware County		
Leiphart Mill	1	York County		
Leisenring	1	Fayette County	15455	
Leisenring Number 3	1	Fayette County		
Leith	1	Fayette County	15401	
Leith-Hatfield	1	Fayette County		
Leithsville	1	Northampton County	18055	
Lemasters	1	Franklin County	17231	
Lemon	1	Wyoming County		
Lemon Township	1	Wyoming County		
Lemont	1	Centre County	16851	
Lemont Furnace	1	Fayette County	15456	
Lemoyne	1	Cumberland County	17043	
Lemoyne-Camp Hill	1	Cumberland County		
Lenape	1	Chester County	19380	
Lenape Heights	1	Armstrong County	16226	
Lenape Park	1	Armstrong County	16226	
Lenhartsville	1	Berks County	19534	
Lenker Manor	1	Dauphin County	17111	
Lenkerville	1	Dauphin County	17061	
Lenni	1	Delaware County	19052	
Lenni Heights	1	Delaware County	19037	
Lenni Mills	1	Delaware County		
Lennox Park	1	Delaware County	19015	
Lenover	1	Chester County	19365	
Lenox	1	Susquehanna County		
Lenox Township	1	Susquehanna County		
Lenoxville	1	Susquehanna County	18441	
Leola	1	Lancaster County	17540	
Leolyn	2	Lycoming County	17765	
Leolyn	2	Tioga County	17765	
Leona	1	Bradford County	16947	
Leonard	1	Clearfield County	16830	
Leonardsville	1	Carbon County		
Leopard	1	Chester County	19312	
Leopard Lakes	1	Chester County	19312	
Lerchs	1	Northampton County		
Lernerville	1	Butler County		
Leroy	1	Bradford County	17743	
Leroy Township	1	Bradford County		
Leslie Run	1	Carbon County		
Lester	1	Delaware County	19029	
Letort	1	Lancaster County	17582	
Letterkenny Army Depot	1	Franklin County	17201	
Letterkenny Township	1	Franklin County		
Level Corner	1	Lycoming County	17744	
Level Green	1	Westmoreland County	15085	
Leviston	1	Carbon County		
Levittown	1	Bucks County	19053	59
Levittown-Tullytown	1	Bucks County		
Lewis Corners	1	Susquehanna County		
Lewis Mills	1	Chester County		
Lewis Run	1	McKean County	16738	
Lewis Run Junction	1	Allegheny County		
Lewis Township	1	Lycoming County		
Lewis Township	1	Northumberland County		
Lewis Township	1	Union County		
Lewisberry	1	York County	17339	
Lewisburg	1	Union County	17837	
Lewistown	1	Mifflin County	17044	
Lewistown	1	Schuylkill County	18252	
Lewistown Junction	1	Mifflin County	17044	
Lewisville	1	Chester County	19351	
Lewisville	1	Indiana County	15725	
Lewisville (Ulysses after 1968)	1	Potter County		
Lexington	1	Lancaster County	17543	
Liberty	1	Allegheny County	15133	
Liberty	1	Fayette County		
Liberty	1	McKean County		
Liberty	1	Tioga County	16930	
Liberty Corners	1	Bradford County	18848	
Liberty Square	1	Lancaster County	17518	
Liberty Township	1	Adams County		
Liberty Township	1	Bedford County		
Liberty Township	1	Centre County		
Liberty Township	1	McKean County		
Liberty Township	1	Mercer County		
Liberty Township	1	Montour County		
Liberty Township	1	Susquehanna County		
Liberty Township	1	Tioga County		
Library	1	Allegheny County	15129	
Library Junction	1	Washington County		
Lickdale	1	Lebanon County		
Licking Creek Township	1	Fulton County		
Licking Township	1	Clarion County		
Lickingville	1	Clarion County	16332	
Liewellyn Corners	1	Luzerne County		
Lightner	1	York County	17404	
Lightstreet	1	Columbia County	17839	
Ligonier	1	Westmoreland County	15658	
Ligonier Township	1	Westmoreland County		
Lilly	1	Cambria County	15938	
Lilly Run Junction	1	Fayette County		
Lillyville	1	Beaver County	16123	
Lima	1	Delaware County	19037	
Lime Bluff	1	Lycoming County		
Limehill	1	Bradford County	18853	
Limekiln	1	Berks County	19535	
Limeport	1	Lehigh County	18060	
Lime Ridge	1	Columbia County	17815	
Lime Valley	1	Lancaster County	17584	
Limerick	1	Montgomery County	19468	
Limerick Center	1	Montgomery County		
Limerick Township	1	Montgomery County		
Limerock	1	Lancaster County	17543	
Limestone	1	Clarion County	16234	
Limestone Township	1	Clarion County		
Limestone Township	1	Lycoming County		
Limestone Township	1	Montour County		
Limestone Township	1	Union County		
Limestone Township	1	Warren County		
Limestoneville	1	Montour County	17847	
Limestown Township	1	Warren County	16351	
Limeville	1	Lancaster County	17527	
Lincoln	1	Allegheny County	15037	
Lincoln	1	Lancaster County	17522	
Lincoln Acres	1	Westmoreland County	15642	
Lincoln Colliery	1	Schuylkill County	17963	
Lincoln Falls	1	Sullivan County		
Lincoln Heights	1	Berks County	19508	
Lincoln Heights	1	Westmoreland County	15644	
Lincoln Hill	1	Washington County	15301	
Lincoln Park	1	Allegheny County	15235	
Lincoln Park	1	Berks County	19609	
Lincoln Park	1	Delaware County	19079	
Lincoln Park	1	Northampton County		
Lincoln Place	1	Allegheny County		
Lincoln Terrace	1	Northampton County	18042	
Lincoln Township	1	Bedford County		
Lincoln Township	1	Huntingdon County		
Lincoln Township	1	Somerset County		
Lincoln University	1	Chester County	19352	
Lincolnville	1	Crawford County	16404	
Lincolnway	1	York County	17404	
Linconia	1	Bucks County	19047	
Lindaville	1	Susquehanna County	18824	
Lindberg Heights	1	Montgomery County		
Lindberg Terrace	1	Montgomery County	19468	
Lindbergh	1	Luzerne County		
Linden	1	Lycoming County	17744	
Linden	1	Washington County	15317	
Linden Grove	1	Allegheny County		
Linden Hall	1	Centre County	16828	
Lindenhurst	1	Bucks County	19068	
Lindner	1	Schuylkill County		
Linds Crossing	1	Blair County		
Lindsey	1	Jefferson County	15767	
Line Lexington	1	Bucks County	18932	
Line Mountain	1	Northumberland County	17941	
Linesville	1	Crawford County	16424	
Linfield	1	Montgomery County	19468	
Linglestown	1	Dauphin County	17112	
Linhart	1	Allegheny County	15145	
Link Belt	1	Montgomery County		
Linn	1	Fayette County	15442	
Linntown	1	Union County	17837	
Linville Circle	1	Lancaster County		
Linwood	1	Delaware County	19061	
Linwood Park	1	Delaware County	19062	
Linwood Terrace	1	Delaware County	19061	
Lionville	1	Chester County	19353	
Lionville-Marchwood	1	Chester County		
Lippincott	1	Greene County	15370	
Lisbon	1	Venango County		
Lisburn	1	Cumberland County	17055	
Listie	1	Somerset County	15549	
Listonburg	1	Somerset County	15424	
Litchfield	1	Bradford County	18810	
Litchfield Township	1	Bradford County		
Lithia Springs	1	Northumberland County	17857	
Lithia Valley	1	Wyoming County	18419	
Lititz	1	Lancaster County	17543	
Little Beaver Township	1	Lawrence County		
Little Britain	1	Lancaster County	17566	
Little Britain Township	1	Lancaster County		
Little Chapel	1	Wayne County	18436	
Little Chicago	1	Greene County	15320	
Little Cooley	1	Crawford County	16404	
Little Corners	1	Crawford County	16335	
Little Gap	1	Carbon County	18058	
Little Germany	1	Perry County	17024	
Little Hickory	1	Forest County		
Little Hope	1	Erie County	16428	
Little Italy	1	Bucks County	18956	
Little Jack Corners	1	Bedford County		
Little Kansas	1	Mifflin County	17051	
Little Mahanoy Township	1	Northumberland County		
Little Marsh	1	Tioga County	16950	
Little Meadows	1	Susquehanna County	18830	
Little Roundtop	1	Juniata County		
Little Summit	1	Fayette County		
Little Summit	1	Monroe County		
Little Summit	1	Washington County		
Littletown	1	Indiana County		
Little Washington	1	Chester County		
Little Washington	1	Cumberland County	17241	
Littles Corners	1	Crawford County	16335	
Littlestown	1	Adams County	17340	
Live Easy	1	Greene County	15320	
Liverpool	1	Perry County	17045	
Liverpool Township	1	Perry County		
Livonia	1	Centre County	16872	
Lizard Creek Junction	1	Carbon County		
Llandrilla	1	Montgomery County	19004	
Llanerch	1	Delaware County		
Llanerch Manor	1	Delaware County	19083	
Llanfair	1	Cambria County	15930	
Llangelan Hills	1	Delaware County	19073	
Llewellyn	1	Schuylkill County	17944	
Llewelyn Corners	1	Luzerne County		
Lloydell	1	Cambria County	15921	
Lloydsville	1	Westmoreland County	15650	
Lloydville	1	Cambria County		
Llyswen	1	Blair County		
