= Sylvan, Pennsylvania =

Unincorporated community in Pennsylvania, US

- Unincorporated community
- Location within Pennsylvania Location within the United States
- Coordinates: 39°45′12″N 78°1′18″W
- Country: United States
- State: Pennsylvania
- County: Franklin
- Township: Warren
- Elevation: 502 ft (153 m)
- Time zone: UTC-5 (Eastern (EST))
  - Summer (DST): UTC-4 (EDT)
- ZIP code: 17236
- Area code: 717
- GNIS feature ID: 1189212

Sylvan is an unincorporated community in Warren Township in Franklin County, Pennsylvania, United States. Sylvan is located on Sylvan Drive, east of Pennsylvania Route 456.
