= Limestone Township, Pennsylvania =

Limestone Township is the name of some places in the U.S. state of Pennsylvania:

- Limestone Township, Clarion County, Pennsylvania
- Limestone Township, Lycoming County, Pennsylvania
- Limestone Township, Montour County, Pennsylvania
- Limestone Township, Union County, Pennsylvania
- Limestone Township, Warren County, Pennsylvania
