= Pennsylvania Route 456 =

State highway in Franklin County, Pennsylvania, US

Pennsylvania Route 456
- Little Cove Road

Route information
- Maintained by PennDOT
- Length: 12.140 mi (19.537 km)
- Existed: 1937–present

Major junctions
- South end: Hollow Road at the Maryland state line near Yeakle's Mill Bridge
- North end: PA 16 near Cove Gap

Location
- Country: United States
- State: Pennsylvania
- Counties: Franklin

Highway system
- Pennsylvania State Route System; Interstate; US; State; Scenic; Legislative
← PA 454	→ PA 458

Pennsylvania Route 456 (PA 456) is a 12.1-mile-long (19.5 km) state highway located in Franklin County, Pennsylvania. The southern terminus is at the Maryland state line near Yeakle's Mill Bridge, where it continues as Hollow Road. The northern terminus is at PA 16 near Cove Gap. The route is a two-lane undivided road called Little Cove Road that passes through a narrow agricultural valley in southwestern Franklin County. PA 456 was designated in 1937 onto its current alignment.

== Route description ==
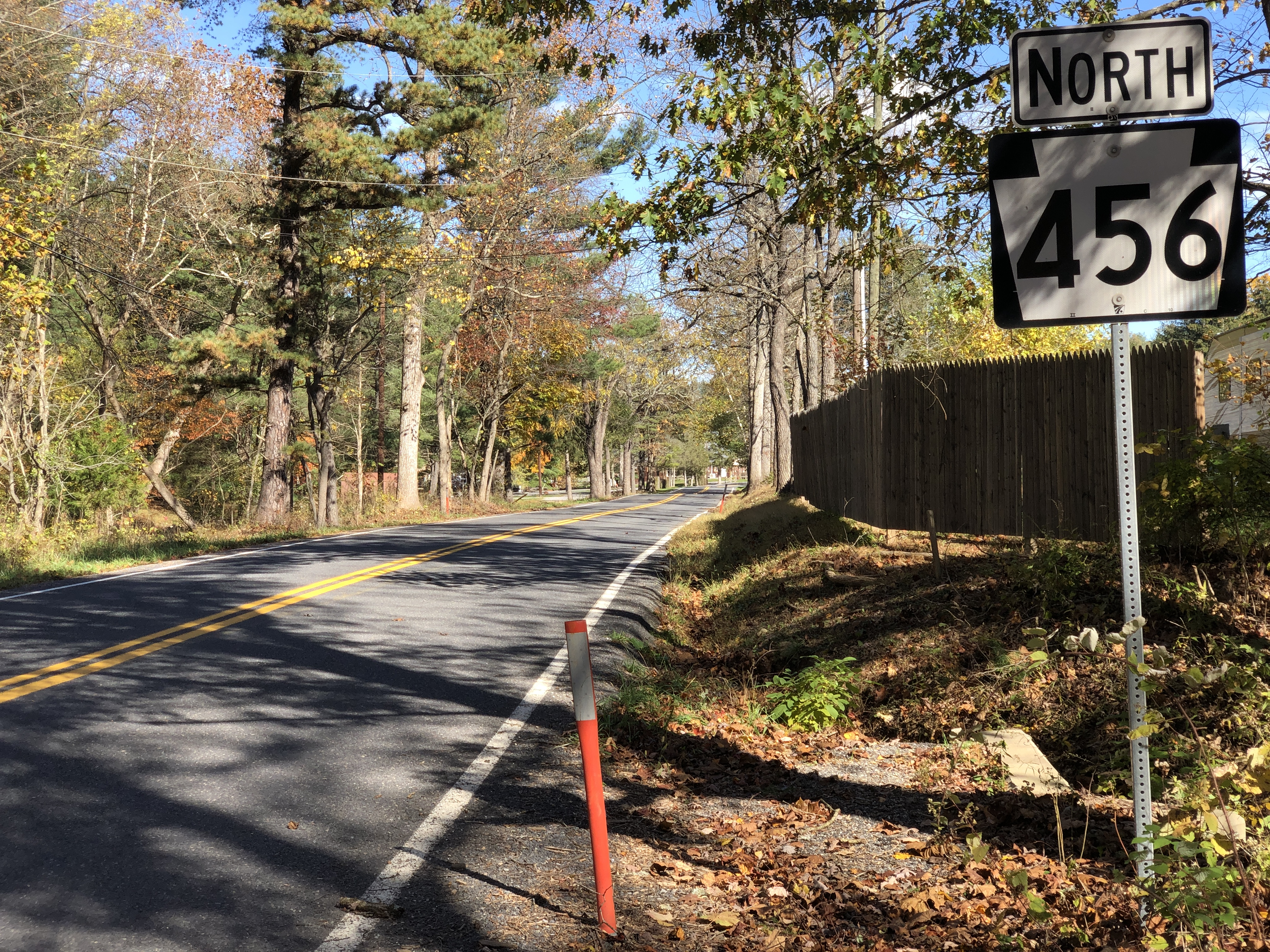
PA 456 northbound in Warren Township

PA 456 begins at the Maryland border in Warren Township, heading north on Little Cove Road, a two-lane undivided road. The road continues into Maryland as Hollow Road, which heads southwest toward an interchange with Interstate 70/U.S. Route 40. From the state line, the route crosses over Licking Creek on a bridge. After crossing the bridge, the route turns northeast into a mix of farmland and forests in a narrow valley. The road continues northeast, passing through many farms and some small communities. PA 456 crosses a second bridge that goes over Little Cove Creek. Further north, the road goes right by Saunderosa Park. PA 456 crosses into Peters Township and reaches its northern terminus at an intersection with PA 16. The entire length of PA 456 has an annual average daily traffic of about 526 vehicles per day.

== History ==
When Pennsylvania first legislated its routes in 1911, what is now PA 456 was not legislated as part of a route. By 1930, what is now PA 456 existed as a paved connecting road. PA 456 was designated in 1937 to follow its current alignment between the Maryland border and PA 16. The bridge going over Little Cove Creek was built in 1937 and reconstructed in 2007. The one going over Licking Creek was built in 1967.

== Major intersections ==
The entire route is in Franklin County.

Location	mi	km	Destinations	Notes
Warren Township	0.000	0.000	Hollow Road – Indian Springs	Maryland state line; southern terminus
Peters Township	12.140	19.537	PA 16 (Buchanan Trail) – McConnellsburg, Mercersburg	Northern terminus
1.000 mi = 1.609 km; 1.000 km = 0.621 mi
