= Bibliography of James Buchanan =

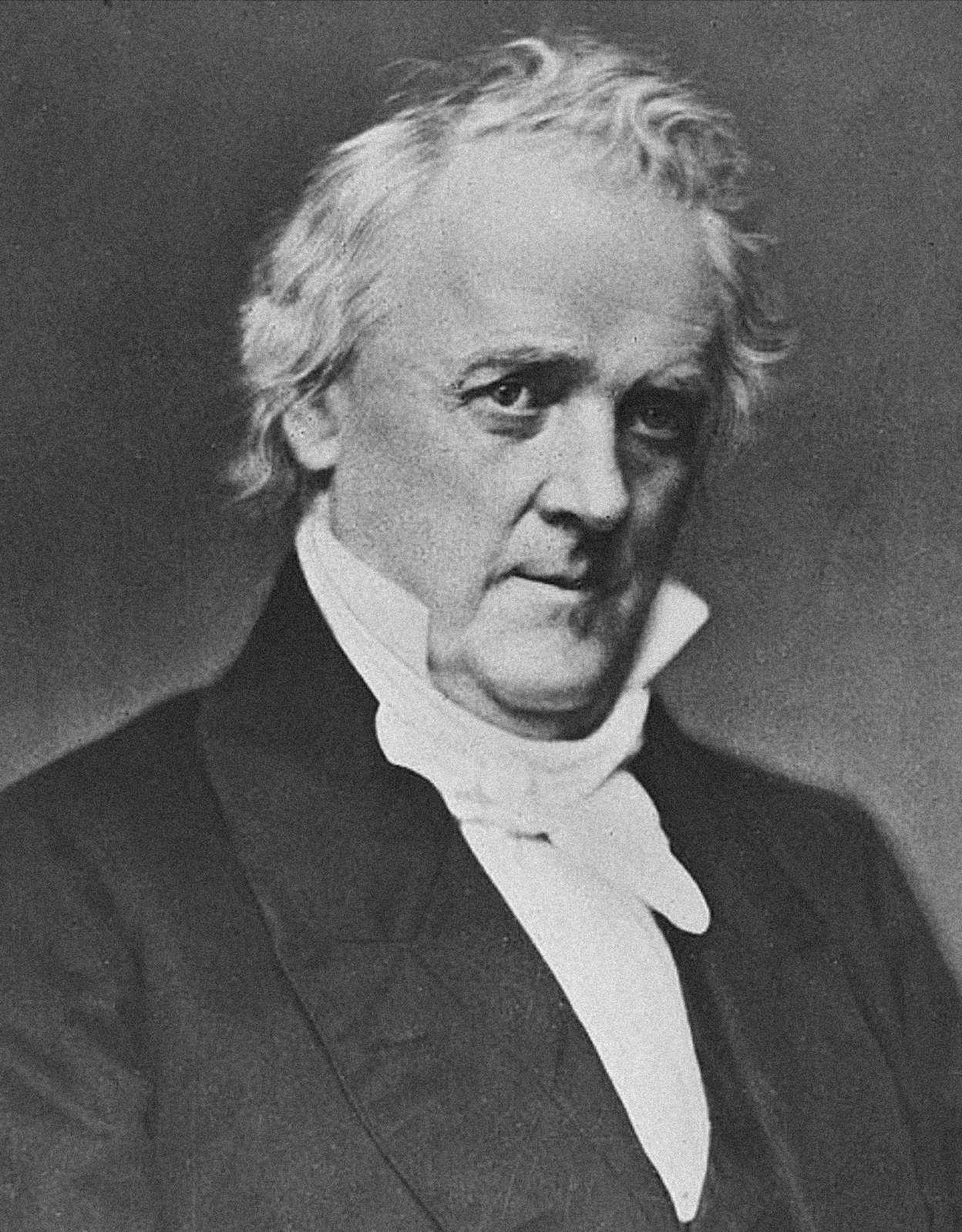
- Buchanan c. 1850–1868

15th President of the United States
- In office March 4, 1857 – March 4, 1861
- Vice President: John C. Breckinridge
- Preceded by: Franklin Pierce
- Succeeded by: Abraham Lincoln

17th United States Secretary of State
- In office March 10, 1845 – March 7, 1849
- President: James K. Polk; Zachary Taylor
- Preceded by: John C. Calhoun
- Succeeded by: John M. Clayton

United States Senator from Pennsylvania
- In office December 6, 1834 – March 5, 1845
- Preceded by: William Wilkins
- Succeeded by: Simon Cameron

Member of the U.S. House of Representatives from Pennsylvania
- In office March 4, 1821 – March 3, 1831
- Preceded by: Jacob Hibshman
- Succeeded by: William Hiester
- Constituency: 3rd district (1821–1823); 4th district (1823–1831)
Committee positions
Chair of the Senate Foreign Relations Committee
In office December 5, 1836 – March 3, 1841
Preceded by	Henry Clay
Succeeded by	William Cabell Rives
Chair of the House Judiciary Committee
In office March 5, 1829 – March 3, 1831
Preceded by	Philip P. Barbour
Succeeded by	Warren R. Davis

United States Minister to the United Kingdom
- In office August 23, 1853 – March 15, 1856
- President: Franklin Pierce
- Preceded by: Joseph Reed Ingersoll
- Succeeded by: George M. Dallas

United States Minister to Russia
- In office June 11, 1832 – August 5, 1833
- President: Andrew Jackson
- Preceded by: John Randolph
- Succeeded by: William Wilkins

Member of the Pennsylvania House of Representatives from Lancaster County
- In office December 6, 1814 – December 2, 1816
- Preceded by: Emanuel Reigart, Joel Lightner, Jacob Grosh, John Graff, Henry Hambright, Robert Maxwell
- Succeeded by: Joel Lightner, Hugh Martin, John Forrey, Henry Hambright, Jasper Slaymaker, Jacob Grosh

Personal details
- Born: April 23, 1791 Cove Gap, Pennsylvania, U.S.
- Died: June 1, 1868 (aged 77) Lancaster Township, Lancaster County, Pennsylvania, U.S.
- Party: Federalist (1814–1824); Democratic-Republican (1824–1828); Democratic (from 1828)
- Relatives: Harriet Lane (niece)
- Education: Dickinson College (BA)
- Occupation: Politician; lawyer

Military service
- Allegiance: United States
- Branch/service: Pennsylvania Militia
- Years of service: 1812–1814
- Rank: Private
- Unit: Shippen's Cavalry, 1st Brigade, 4th Division
- Battles/wars: War of 1812; Battle of Baltimore

This is a select bibliography of academic level books and journal articles, published mainly after World War II, (Note: Works published during or before World War II should be limited to areas where there are no significant post-World War II books on the subject or when the work in question has significant historical merit.) about the history of James Buchanan and his historical context.

James Buchanan (April 23, 1791 – June 1, 1868) was the 15th president of the United States from 1857 to 1861. The last president to serve before the American Civil War, Buchanan was a supporter of the right of states to permit slavery, and generally favored the interests of slave states. His administration's support for the pro-slavery Lecompton Constitution in Kansas, and his response to the secession crisis, exacerbated the sectional tensions that led to the Civil War.

Works listed here are cited in the notes or bibliographies of scholarly sources. Each is published by an academic or major press, written by a recognized expert, or substantially reviewed in scholarly journals; borderline cases are omitted. A selection of primary sources are included. Many of the books below carry their own bibliographies; see the Further reading section for other bibliographies, and the External links section for historical sites, academic sites, and museums.

Citations follow APA style. (Note: Entries are in plain text APA 7 format without templates; templates are used only for reviews and notes.) Book have citations to academic journal or mainstream published reviews when available. For books only partly about the subject, relevant chapter or section titles are provided when useful and available. Translators of the original-language edition are included when possible. In cases where a title or name has appeared with more than one English spelling, the most recent published form is used and a footnote documents any earlier title under which the work appeared.

== General works ==
- Baker, J. H. (2004). James Buchanan. Times Books.
- Balcerski, T. J. (2019). Bosom friends: The intimate world of James Buchanan and William Rufus King. Oxford University Press.
- Binder, F. M. (1994). James Buchanan and the American empire. Susquehanna University Press.
- Binder, F. M. (1995). James Buchanan and the earl of Clarendon: An uncertain relationship. Diplomacy & Statecraft, 6(2), 323–341.
- Birkner, M. J. (Ed.). (1996). James Buchanan and the political crisis of the 1850s. Susquehanna University Press.
- Birkner, M. J., Miller, R. M., & Quist, J. W. (Eds.). (2019). The worlds of James Buchanan and Thaddeus Stevens: Place, personality, and politics in the Civil War era. Louisiana State University Press.
- Holt, M. F. (2017). The election of 1860: "A campaign fraught with consequences". University Press of Kansas.
- Klein, P. S. (1962). President James Buchanan: A biography. Pennsylvania State University Press.
- Landis, M. T. (2014). Northern men with Southern loyalties: The Democratic Party and the sectional crisis. Cornell University Press.
- Landis, M. T. (2016). Old Buck's lieutenant: Glancy Jones, James Buchanan, and the antebellum northern democracy. The Pennsylvania Magazine of History and Biography, 140(2), 183.
- Lynn, J. A. (2018). A manly doughface: James Buchanan and the sectional politics of gender. The Journal of the Civil War Era, 8(4), 591–620.
- Lynn, J. A. (2019). Preserving the white man's republic: Jacksonian democracy, race, and the transformation of American conservatism. University of Virginia Press.
- Meerse, D. E. (1966). Buchanan, corruption and the election of 1860. Civil War History, 12(2), 116–131.
- Meerse, D. E. (1973). The northern Democratic Party and the congressional elections of 1858. Civil War History, 19(2), 119–137.
- Meerse, D. E. (1978). Presidential leadership, suffrage qualifications, and Kansas: 1857. Civil War History, 24(4), 293–313.
- Meerse, D. E. (1995). Buchanan, the patronage, and the Lecompton constitution: A case study. Civil War History, 41(4), 291–312.
- Quist, J. W., & Birkner, M. J. (Eds.). (2013). James Buchanan and the coming of the Civil War. University Press of Florida.
- Smith, E. B. (1975). The presidency of James Buchanan. University Press of Kansas.

== Background and context ==
The below items contain significant information about James Buchanan or significant background and context for his life and presidency.

- Bourne, K. (1961). The Clayton-Bulwer Treaty and the decline of British opposition to the territorial expansion of the United States, 1857–60. The Journal of Modern History, 33(3), 287–291.
- Brown, R. F. (1991). Charles Lennox Wyke and the Clayton-Bulwer formula in Central America, 1852–1860. The Americas, 47(4), 411–445. JSTOR 1006684
- Childers, C. (2012). The failure of popular sovereignty: Slavery, manifest destiny, and the radicalization of Southern politics. University Press of Kansas. JSTOR jj.40478752
- Collins, B. W. (1978). The Democrats' electoral fortunes during the Lecompton crisis. Civil War History, 24(4), 314–331.
- Cooper, W. J. (2013). We have the war upon us: The onset of the Civil War, November 1860–April 1861. Vintage.
- Crofts, D. W. (1989). Reluctant Confederates: Upper South Unionists in the secession crisis. University of North Carolina Press.
- Etcheson, N. (2004). Bleeding Kansas: Contested liberty in the Civil War era. University Press of Kansas.
- Freehling, W. W. (1990). The road to disunion: Vol. 1. Secessionists at bay, 1776–1854. Oxford University Press.
- Freehling, W. W. (2007). The road to disunion: Vol. 2. Secessionists triumphant, 1854–1861. Oxford University Press.
- Harris, W. C. (2007). Lincoln's rise to the presidency. University Press of Kansas.
- Holt, M. F. (1978). The political crisis of the 1850s. Wiley.
- Huebner, T. S. (2016). Liberty and union: The Civil War era and American constitutionalism. University Press of Kansas.
- Johannsen, R. W. (1973). Stephen A. Douglas. Oxford University Press.
- McPherson, J. M. (1988). Battle cry of freedom: The Civil War era. Oxford University Press.
- Nevins, A. (1950). The emergence of Lincoln. Charles Scribner's Sons.
- Potter, D. M. (1976). The impending crisis, 1848–1861. Harper & Row.
- Reid, B. H. (1992). The crisis at Fort Sumter in 1861 reconsidered. History, 77(249), 3–32.
- Robinson, M. (2013). William Henry Seward and the onset of the secession crisis. Civil War History, 59(1), 32–66.
- Silbey, J. H. (2009). Party over section: The rough and ready presidential election of 1848. University Press of Kansas.
- St. John, R. (2016). The unpredictable America of William Gwin: Expansion, secession, and the unstable borders of nineteenth-century North America. The Journal of the Civil War Era, 6(1), 56–84.
- Stampp, K. M. (1950). And the war came: The North and the secession crisis, 1860–1861. Louisiana State University Press.
- Stampp, K. M. (1990). America in 1857: A nation on the brink. Oxford University Press.
- Stegmaier, M. J. (1985). Intensifying the sectional conflict: William Seward versus James Hammond in the Lecompton debate of 1858. Civil War History, 31(3), 197–221.
- Varon, E. R. (2008). Disunion! The coming of the American Civil War, 1789–1859. University of North Carolina Press.

=== Slavery ===
- Ashworth, J. (1996). Slavery, capitalism, and politics in the antebellum republic: Vol. 1. Commerce and compromise, 1820–1850. Cambridge University Press.
- Childers, C. (2012). The failure of popular sovereignty: Slavery, manifest destiny, and the radicalization of Southern politics. University Press of Kansas. JSTOR jj.40478752
- Cooper, W. J., Jr. (1978). The South and the politics of slavery, 1828–1856. Louisiana State University Press.
- Epps, K. (2016). Slavery on the periphery: The Kansas-Missouri border in the antebellum and Civil War eras. University of Georgia Press.
- Fehrenbacher, D. E., & McAfee, W. M. (2002). The slaveholding republic: An account of the United States government's relations to slavery. Oxford University Press.
- Fehrenbacher, D. E. (2001). The Dred Scott case: Its significance in American law and politics. Oxford University Press.
- Genovese, E. D. (1974). Roll, Jordan, roll: The world the slaves made. Pantheon Books.
- Hamilton, M. K. (2011). "To preserve African slavery": The secession commissioners to Texas, 1861. Southwestern Historical Quarterly, 114(4), 355–376.
- Huston, J. L. (2003). Calculating the value of the Union: Slavery, property rights, and the economic origins of the Civil War. University of North Carolina Press.
- Karp, M. (2016). This vast southern empire: Slaveholders at the helm of American foreign policy. Harvard University Press. JSTOR j.ctv24w65zs
- Kennington, K. M. (2017). In the shadow of Dred Scott: St. Louis freedom suits and the legal culture of slavery in antebellum America. University of Georgia Press.
- Maltz, E. M. (2010). Fugitive slave on trial: The Anthony Burns case and abolitionist outrage. University Press of Kansas.
- Maltz, E. M. (2007). Dred Scott and the politics of slavery. University Press of Kansas.
- Oakes, J. (1982). The ruling race: A history of American slaveholders. Alfred A. Knopf.
- Radan, P. (2023). Creating a more perfect slaveholders' union: Slavery, the Constitution, and secession in antebellum America. University Press of Kansas.
- Roberts-Miller, P. (2010). Fanatical schemes: Proslavery rhetoric and the tragedy of consensus. University of Alabama Press. JSTOR jj.30347056

=== Utah ===
- Etcheson, N. (2018). Buchanan's Mormon judge: Delana R. Eckels and the Democratic Party in the Utah War. Civil War History, 64(4), 335–364.
- MacKinnon, W. P. (1963). The Buchanan spoils system and the Utah expedition: Careers of W. M. F. Magraw and John M. Hockaday. Utah Historical Quarterly, 31(2), 127–150. JSTOR 45059094
- MacKinnon, W. P. (1977). The gap in the Buchanan revival: The Utah expedition of 1857–58. Utah Historical Quarterly, 45(1), 36–46. JSTOR 45060494
- MacKinnon, W. P. (1984). 125 years of conspiracy theories: Origins of the Utah expedition of 1857–58. Utah Historical Quarterly, 52(3), 212–230. JSTOR 45061388
- MacKinnon, W. P. (2008). And the war came: James Buchanan, the Utah expedition, and the decision to intervene. Utah Historical Quarterly, 76(1), 22–37. JSTOR 45063113
- Poll, R. D., & Hansen, R. W. (1961). "Buchanan's blunder" The Utah War, 1857–1858. Military Affairs, 25(3), 121. JSTOR 1983459

== Historiography ==
- Birkner, M. J. (2005). Looking up from the basement: New biographies of Franklin Pierce and James Buchanan. Pennsylvania History: A Journal of Mid-Atlantic Studies, 72(4), 535–543. JSTOR 27778708
- Bonner, T. N. (1956). Civil War historians and the "needless war" doctrine. Journal of the History of Ideas, 17(2), 193. JSTOR 2707742
- Egerton, D. R. (2011). Rethinking Atlantic historiography in a postcolonial era: The Civil War in a global perspective. The Journal of the Civil War Era, 1(1), 79–95.
- Fladeland, B. L. (1986). Revisionists vs. abolitionists: The historiographical cold war of the 1930s and 1940s. Journal of the Early Republic, 6(1), 1. JSTOR 3122667
- Foner, E. (1974). The causes of the American Civil War: Recent interpretations and new directions. Civil War History, 20(3), 197–214.
- Huston, J. L. (2016). Did the tug have to come? A critique of the new revisionism of the secession winter. Civil War History, 62(3), 247–283.
- Nice, D. C. (1984). The influence of war and party system aging on the ranking of presidents. The Western Political Quarterly, 37(3), 443. JSTOR 448445
- Pressly, T. J. (1954). Americans interpret their Civil War. Princeton University Press.
- Rottinghaus, B., & Vaughn, J. S. (2017). Presidential greatness and political science: Assessing the 2014 APSA Presidents and Executive Politics Section presidential greatness survey. Political Science and Politics, 50(3), 824–830.
- Rottinghaus, B., Eady, G., & Vaughn, J. S. (2020). Presidential greatness in a polarized era: Results from the latest presidential greatness survey. PS: Political Science & Politics, 53(3), 413–420.
- Simonton, D. K. (1986). Presidential greatness: The historical consensus and its psychological significance. Political Psychology, 7(2), 259. JSTOR 3791125
- Towers, F. (2011). Partisans, new history, and modernization: The historiography of the Civil War's causes, 1861–2011. The Journal of the Civil War Era, 1(2), 237–264.
- Wilson, M. L. (1970). The Free Soil concept of progress and the irrepressible conflict. American Quarterly, 22(4), 769. JSTOR 2711869
- Woods, M. E. (2012). What twenty-first-century historians have said about the causes of disunion: A Civil War sesquicentennial review of the recent literature. Journal of American History, 99(2), 415–439.

== Primary sources ==
- James Buchanan and Harriet Lane Johnston Papers. Library of Congress, Manuscript Division. Approximately 1,600 items, 1825–1887, digitized and searchable online.
- "James Buchanan papers". University of Pennsylvania Libraries. The largest Buchanan collection: 35 linear feet (74 boxes, 25 volumes), 1783–1895, bulk 1815–1868, spanning his legal practice through the presidency.
- James Buchanan Online Presidential Library. LancasterHistory, Lancaster, Pa. Over 3,500 digitized items and 9,000+ pages of letters, political papers, and financial documents, with 1,350 transcriptions, from the organization that operates Wheatland.
- James Buchanan papers (MC 1998.10). Archives & Special Collections, Waidner-Spahr Library, Dickinson College, Carlisle, Pa. Over 400 letters plus speech drafts and pamphlets, 1808–1991, at Buchanan's alma mater.
- Moore, J. B. (Ed.). The works of James Buchanan, comprising his speeches, state papers, and private correspondence (12 vols.). J. B. Lippincott, 1908–1911. Full text digitized in HathiTrust; still the standard published edition of his papers.
- James Buchanan. The American Presidency Project, University of California, Santa Barbara. Searchable texts of his presidential messages, proclamations, and other public papers.

== See also ==
- 1856 United States presidential election
- Presidency of James Buchanan
- Pig War (1859)
- Utah War
- Vice presidency of John C. Breckinridge
- John C. Breckinridge
- Panic of 1857
- Morrill Tariff
- Dred Scott v. Sandford
