= Shanksville Volunteer Fire Department =

Pennsylvania volunteer fire department

Coordinates: 40.01773°N 78.90665°W

Operational area
- Country: United States
- State: Pennsylvania
- County: Somerset
- Borough: Shanksville

Agency overview
- Employees: 28 (2014)

Website
- Official website

The Shanksville Volunteer Fire Department is a volunteer fire department in Shanksville, Pennsylvania. The department provides fire protection and emergency medical services to the boroughs of Shanksville and Indian Lake as well as to Stonycreek Township. The response area is approximately 62 square miles (160 km^{2}) with an estimated 2,500 residents. Additionally the department is responsible for a 15-mile (24 km) stretch of the Pennsylvania Turnpike.

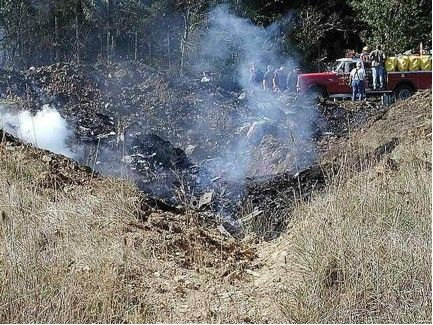
The impact crater at the crash site.

== September 11 terrorist attacks ==
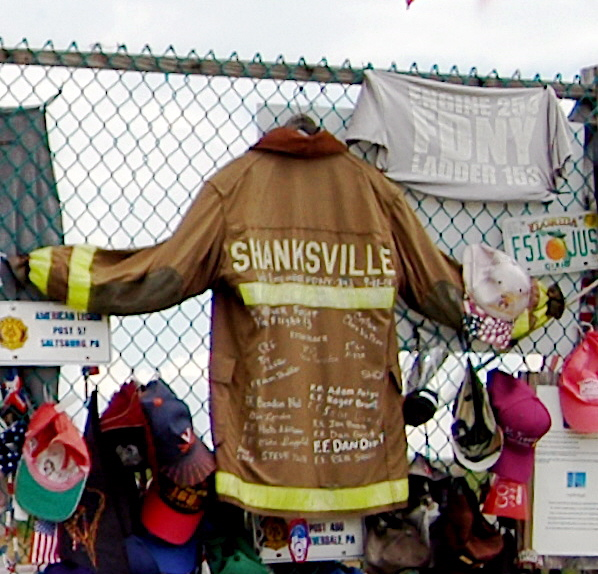
Shanksville Volunteer Firefighter Coat at the Flight 93 temporary national memorial.

On September 11, 2001, the Shanksville Volunteer Fire Department responded to the United Airlines Flight 93 crash scene to search for survivors. They found a smoking crater 8 feet (2.4 m) to 10 feet (3.0 m) deep, and 30 feet (9.1 m) to 50 feet (15 m) wide. None of the 44 people on board survived. Flight 93 was one of four airliners hijacked that day as part of the al-Qaeda terror attack on the United States. It is widely held that the Flight 93 hijackers intended to use the aircraft to attack the United States Capitol building in Washington, DC.

Before the crash - the fire department's assistant chief, Rick King, was off-duty and on the phone with his sister in Lambertsville. His sister told him about the sound of a jet engine flying overhead. Rick walked out on his porch to hear the impact and see a plume of black smoke.

After witnessing the crash, Rick drove into Shanksville to his family-owned store, grabbed his firefighting gear and headed to the fire station, where he informed the dispatcher "This is a large jetliner, probably related to what’s going on [in New York and Washington]" and, along with three on-duty firefighters - Keith Custer, Merle Flick and Robert Kelly - arrived at the crash site within seven or eight minutes. They would later be joined by Chief Terry Shaffer and county coroner Wallace "Wally" Miller. King also requested the assistance of several additional fire departments - namely from Stoystown, Berlin, Central City and Hooversville.

Knowing it would be an active crime scene, firefighters extinguished fires and gathered debris from the plane using portable water packs, rakes and shovels, until FBI officials from Pittsburgh arrived on-scene at around 2pm. The firefighters joined the Pennsylvania State Police in securing the crash site as they investigated.

After 10 hours at the crash site, Shanksville firefighters returned to their station at 8:45 PM. They were on standby at the crash site for the next 13 days and later attended the memorial service for the victims, organized by United Airlines, on September 17th and 20th, 2001, respectively.

== Shanksville Firehouse memorial ==
New York City fire fighters donated a memorial made from a steel cross from the World Trade Center and mounted atop a platform shaped like the Pentagon. Hundreds of firefighters riding motorcycles escorted the beams from New York City to Shanksville. It was installed outside the firehouse on August 25, 2008.

== Heart4Terry campaign ==
In 2021, Terry Shaffer - the department's chief at the time of the September 11th attacks - was diagnosed with pulmonary hypertension and congestive heart failure. These conditions were not covered by the World Trade Center Health Program. A crowdfunding campaign was launched for a new heart. More than 500 donors raised more than $100,000 to cover his expenses, and Shaffer received a new heart in April 2022.

== See also ==
- United Airlines Flight 93
- Flight 93 National Memorial
