= Peters Township, Pennsylvania =

Peters Township is the name of two Pennsylvania townships:

- Peters Township, Franklin County, Pennsylvania
- Peters Township, Washington County, Pennsylvania
