= LeMasters =

LeMasters may refer to:

- Lemasters, Pennsylvania, U.S., unincorporated community in Peters Township in Franklin County
- Braeden Lemasters (born 1986), American actor, musician, and singer
- Clark W. LeMasters Jr., United States Army general

== See also ==
- LeMaster, surname
