= List of places in Pennsylvania: Y–Z =

This list of cities, towns, unincorporated communities, counties, and other recognized places in the U.S. state of Pennsylvania also includes information on the number and names of counties in which the place lies, and its lower and upper zip code bounds, if applicable.

Name of place	Number of counties	Principal county	Lower zip code	Upper zip code
Yardley	1	Bucks County	19067	
Yardley Farms	1	Bucks County	19067	
Yarnell	1	Centre County	16823	
Yatesboro	1	Armstrong County	16263	
Yatesville	1	Luzerne County	18640	
Yatesville	1	Schuylkill County	17976	
Yeadon	1	Delaware County	19050	
Yeagertown	1	Mifflin County	17099	
Yeakle Mill	1	Franklin County		
Yellow Creek	1	Bedford County	16650	
Yellow Hammer	1	Forest County	16352	
Yellow House	1	Berks County	19518	
Yellow Springs	1	Blair County		
Yellow Springs	1	Chester County		
Yellowood	1	Bucks County		
Yerkes	1	Montgomery County	19426	
Yocumtown	1	York County	17319	
Yoe	1	York County	17313	
York	1	York County	17401	07
York Furnace	1	York County		
York Gardens	1	Montgomery County	19040	
York Haven	1	York County	17370	
York New Salem	1	York County	17371	
York Road	1	Bucks County	18974	
York Road	1	York County	17331	
York Run	1	Fayette County	15401	
York Run Junction	1	Fayette County		
York Springs	1	Adams County	17372	
York Township	1	York County		
Yorkana	1	York County	17402	
Yorklyn	1	York County	17402	
Yorkshire	1	York County	17402	
Yorktowne Homes	1	York County		
Yostville	1	Lackawanna County	18444	
Young Township	1	Indiana County		
Young Township	1	Jefferson County		
Youngdale	1	Clinton County	17748	
Youngsburg	1	Chester County	19320	
Youngstown	1	Fayette County		
Youngstown	1	Luzerne County	18221	
Youngstown	1	Westmoreland County	15696	
Youngsville	1	Northampton County	18038	
Youngsville	1	Warren County	16371	
Youngwood	1	Westmoreland County	15697	
Yount	1	Bedford County		
Yukon	1	Westmoreland County	15698	
Zaner	1	Columbia County		
Zebleys Corner	1	Delaware County	19061	
Zediker	1	Washington County		
Zehners	1	Schuylkill County		
Zeigler	1	York County		
Zelienople	1	Butler County	16063	
Zenith	1	Luzerne County		
Zenners	1	Schuylkill County		
Zeno	1	Butler County		
Zerbe	1	Schuylkill County	17981	
Zerbe Township	1	Northumberland County		
Zerby	1	Centre County		
Zieglerville	1	Montgomery County	19492	
Zimmerman	1	Somerset County		
Zinns Mill	1	Lebanon County		
Zion	1	Centre County	16823	
Zion	1	Luzerne County	18643	
Zion Grove	1	Schuylkill County	17985	
Zion Heights	1	Bradford County		
Zion Hill	1	Clarion County	16213	
Zionhill	1	Bucks County	18981	
Zions View	1	York County	17404	
Zionsville	1	Lehigh County	18092	
Zollarsville	1	Washington County	15345	
Zooks Corner	1	Lancaster County	17602	
Zooks Dam	1	Juniata County	17059	
Zora	1	Adams County	17320	
Zucksville	1	Northampton County	18042	
Zullinger	1	Franklin County	17272	
Zumbro	1	Franklin County		
