= Lashley =

Lashley may refer to:

== People ==
- Bobby Lashley (born 1976), American professional wrestler and mixed martial artist
- Karl Lashley (1890–1958), American psychologist and behaviorist
- Michael Lashley, Barbadian politician
- Nick Lashley, American guitarist
- Peter Lashley (1937–2023), Barbadian cricketer
- Sylvan Lashley, former president of the Atlantic Union College

== Places ==
- Lashley, Georgia, a town in Houston County, Georgia, US
- Lashley, Pennsylvania, a town in Fulton County, Pennsylvania, US

== See also ==
- William Lashly (1867–1940), Royal Navy seaman
- Lasley, a surname
