= Buchanan's Birthplace State Park =

State park in Pennsylvania, United States

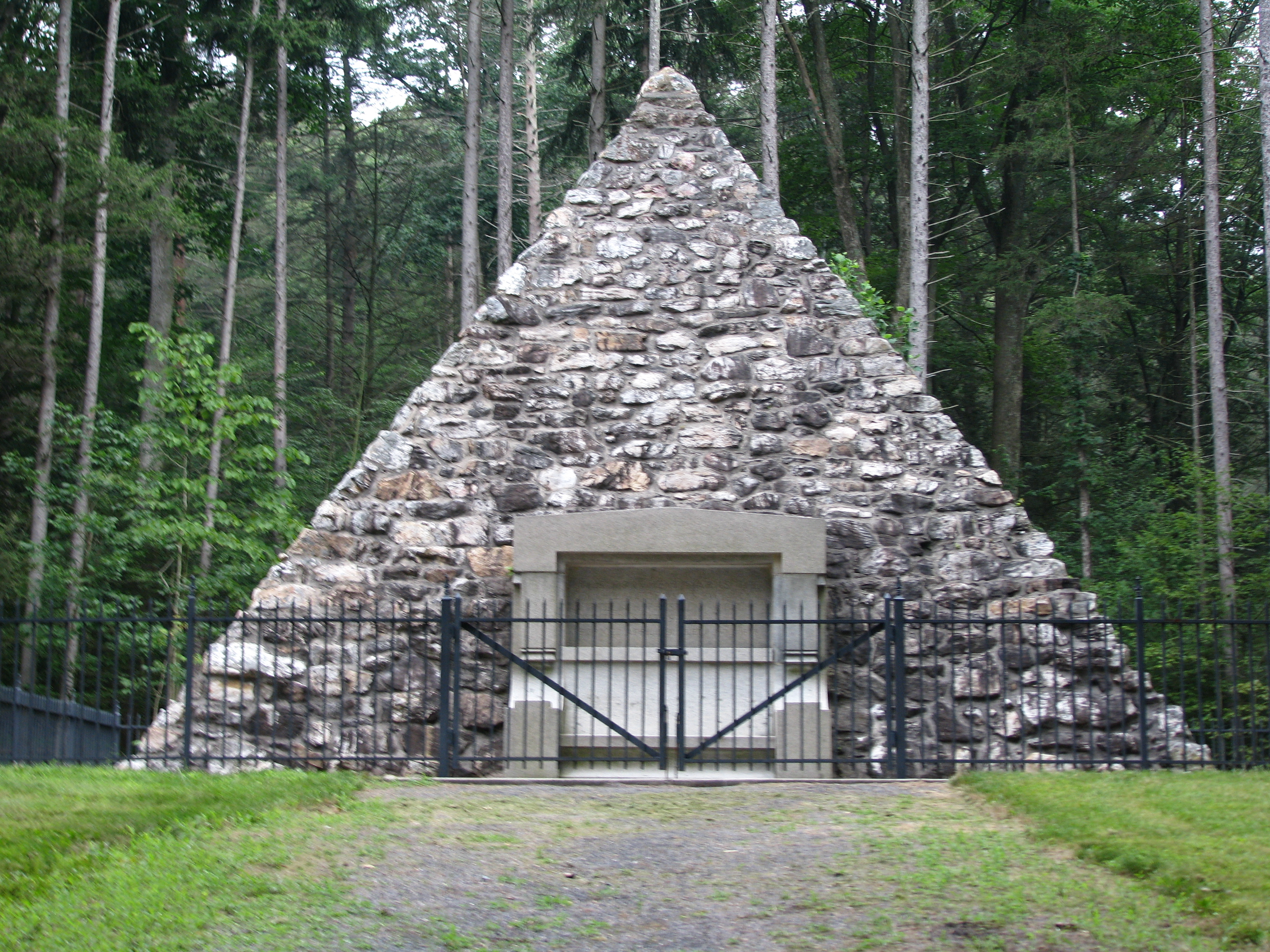

- Location within Pennsylvania Location within the United States
- Interactive map of Buchanan's Birthplace State Park
- Location: Peters Township, Franklin County, Pennsylvania, United States
- Coordinates: 39°52′05″N 77°57′10″W
- Area: 18.5 acres (7.5 ha)
- Elevation: 912 ft (278 m)
- Established: 1911
- Administrator: Pennsylvania Department of Conservation and Natural Resources
- Website: Official website
- Pennsylvania State Parks

Buchanan's Birthplace State Park is an 18.5-acre (7.5 ha) Pennsylvania state park near Cove Gap in Peters Township, Franklin County, Pennsylvania. The park was created from land donated to the state by Harriet Lane in honor of her uncle, the 15th President of the United States, James Buchanan. It is on Pennsylvania Route 16 along Tuscarora Mountain.

== Recreation ==
Recreation facilities are limited. There are two pavilions and a number of picnic tables. Drinking water and two restrooms are located near the picnic area. A pyramid built with native stone stands at the site of the cabin where President Buchanan was born. Buck Run runs through the park and has a population of native trout for fishing. Tuscarora Trail, a bypass trail for the Appalachian Trail, passes just to the west of the park.

== Buchanan's Birthplace ==
President James Buchanan was born into an Ulster Scots family on April 23, 1791, near the village of Cove Gap. He was born in a log cabin on property owned by his father. The complex was known as Stony Batter, named for the family home near Ramelton in County Donegal in Ulster, the northern province in Ireland. At the time of Buchanan's birth, the Cove Gap area was on the edge of the American frontier. Today it is a quite isolated area, but when President Buchanan was born it was a center of frontier commerce. Stony Batter was a complex of cabins, barns, stables, storehouses, a general store, and an orchard. Pioneers travelling from the East Coast through Cove Gap stopped at Stony Batter to rest and replenish their supplies. Buchanan lived at Stony Batter until he was six years old, when his father moved his business to Mercersburg.

== Monument ==
Harriet Lane Johnston was President Buchanan's niece and since he never married she served as his First Lady. She led the effort to create a memorial to her uncle. She made several efforts to purchase his birthplace, Stony Batter, but was ultimately unsuccessful. When she wrote her will in 1895, she created a trust whose task it was to pursue the construction of monuments to her uncle. Upon Harriet Lane's death, in 1903, the responsibility for building the monument devolved upon a banker from Washington, D.C., E. Francis Riggs and a lawyer from Baltimore, Lawrason Riggs (not to be confused with E. Francis' brother of the same name). As the area was no longer a center of commerce, and had become a remote place, it is uncertain why it took years to purchase Stony Batter, but the Riggs' were finally successful in doing so in 1907. The monument in the shape of a pyramid was built of native stone. Wyatt and Nolting, an architectural firm from Baltimore, designed the memorial. The pyramid is 38 feet (12 m) square and 31 feet (9.4 m) high. It is made of 50 short tons (45 t) of American Gray Granite and 250 tons of mortar and native stones. Construction of the pyramid began in October 1907 with a work force of 20 men. They built a small railroad to haul the heavy materials from the mountainside to the construction site. The work force grew to 35 men and the monument was completed by late winter with a surrounding iron railing. The Pennsylvania General Assembly of 1911 accepted the monument from the trust of Harriet Lane Johnston and Buchanan's Birthplace State Park was formally established. The grounds of the park are maintained by the Pennsylvania Department of Conservation and Natural Resources, and is assisted on a volunteer basis by the Cove Gap Historical Society (CGHS).

== See also ==
- Wheatland (James Buchanan House)
