= McCoy–Shoemaker Farm =

Historic house in Pennsylvania, United States

- U.S. National Register of Historic Places
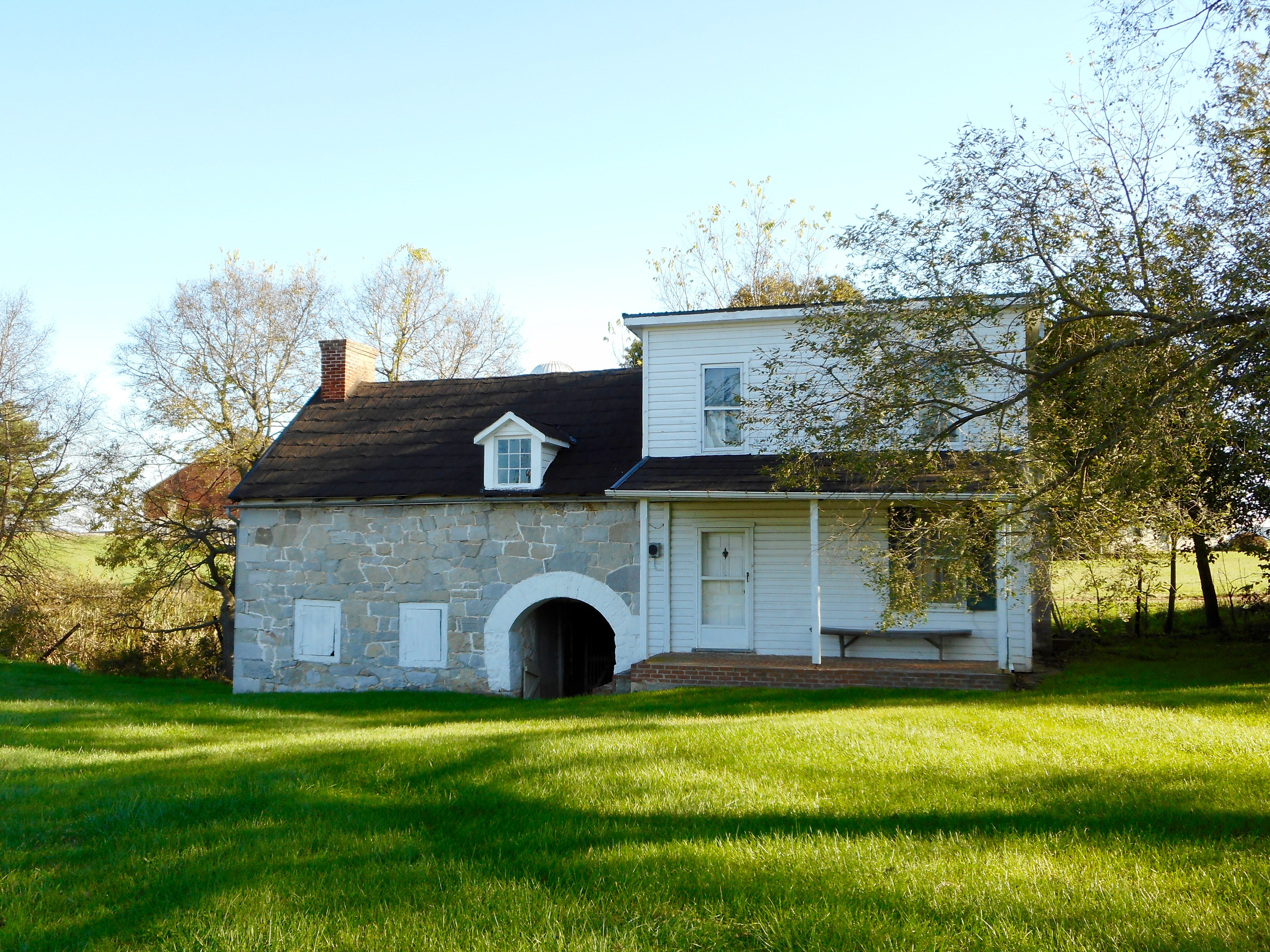
- McCoy–Shoemaker Farm house

- Location within Pennsylvania Location within the United States
- Location: Southwest of Upton on Pennsylvania Route 995, Peters Township, Pennsylvania
- Coordinates: 39°47′57″N 77°49′20″W
- Area: 5 acres (2.0 ha)
- Built: 1800
- NRHP reference No.: 80003500
- Added to NRHP: June 27, 1980

McCoy–Shoemaker Farm is a historic home and farm complex located at Peters Township in Franklin County, Pennsylvania. The property includes a main house dated to the 1820s or 1830s, a 1 1/2-story stone spring house and dwelling built about 1800 with frame addition, large stone end bank barn, frame wash house, stone smokehouse, and brick privy. The main house is a two-story, five-bay, L-shaped brick building on a fieldstone foundation. The stone spring house may have also been used as a distillery.

It was listed on the National Register of Historic Places in 1980.
