= White House Inn =

- U.S. National Register of Historic Places
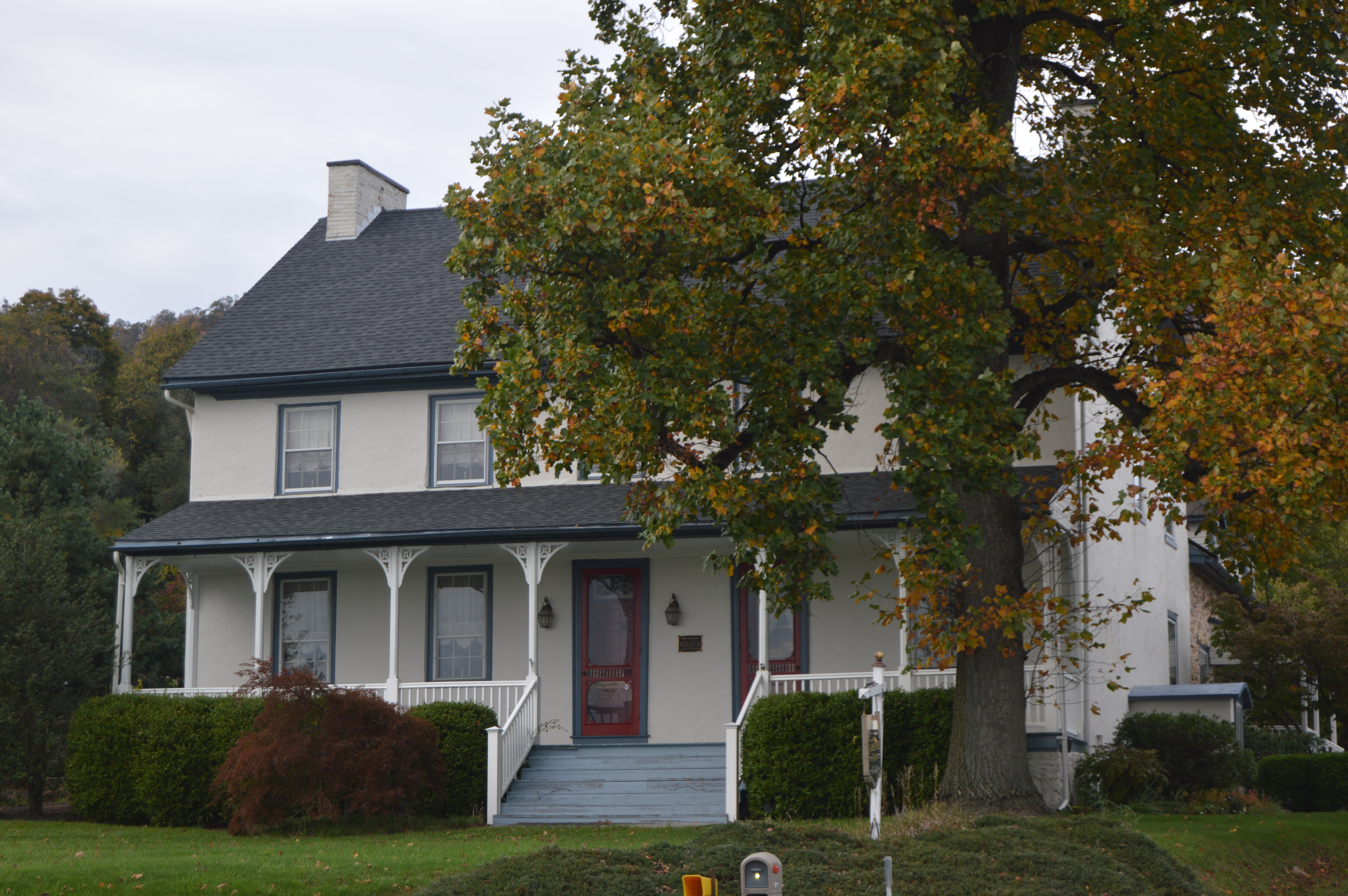
- Front and eastern side

- Location within Pennsylvania Location within the United States
- Location: 10111 Lincoln Way West, Peters Township, Pennsylvania
- Coordinates: 39°54′12″N 77°51′15″W
- Area: 0.3 acres (0.12 ha)
- Built: 1804-1807
- Built by: McDowell, Patrick
- Architectural style: Georgian
- NRHP reference No.: 86000304
- Added to NRHP: February 27, 1986

White House Inn is a historic inn and tavern located in Peters Township, Franklin County, Pennsylvania, United States. The L-shaped building consists of two parts: a two-story, five-bay stuccoed stone section built between 1804 and 1807, and a 1 1/2-story rear stone section dated to the fourth quarter of the 18th century. Its architecture is representative of a transitional Georgian / Federal style.

It was listed on the National Register of Historic Places in 1986.
