= Charlestown, Pennsylvania =

Unincorporated area in Pennsylvania, U.S.

Coordinates: 40.0877°N 75.5536°W

Charlestown is an unincorporated area in Peters Township, in Franklin County, in the U.S. state of Pennsylvania.

== History ==
Charlestown had approximately 50 inhabitants in 1878.
