= Yeakle Mill, Pennsylvania =

- Unincorporated community
- Location within Pennsylvania Location within the United States
- Coordinates: 39°44′2″N 78°2′04″W
- Country: United States
- State: Pennsylvania
- County: Franklin
- Township: Warren
- Elevation: 463 ft (141 m)
- Time zone: UTC-5 (Eastern (EST))
  - Summer (DST): UTC-4 (EDT)
- ZIP code: 17236
- Area code: 717
- GNIS feature ID: 1205003

Yeakle Mill is an unincorporated community in Warren Township in Franklin County, Pennsylvania, United States. Yeakle Mill is located on Mill Drive east of Pennsylvania Route 456.
