= Church Hill Farm =

Historic house in Pennsylvania, United States

- U.S. National Register of Historic Places
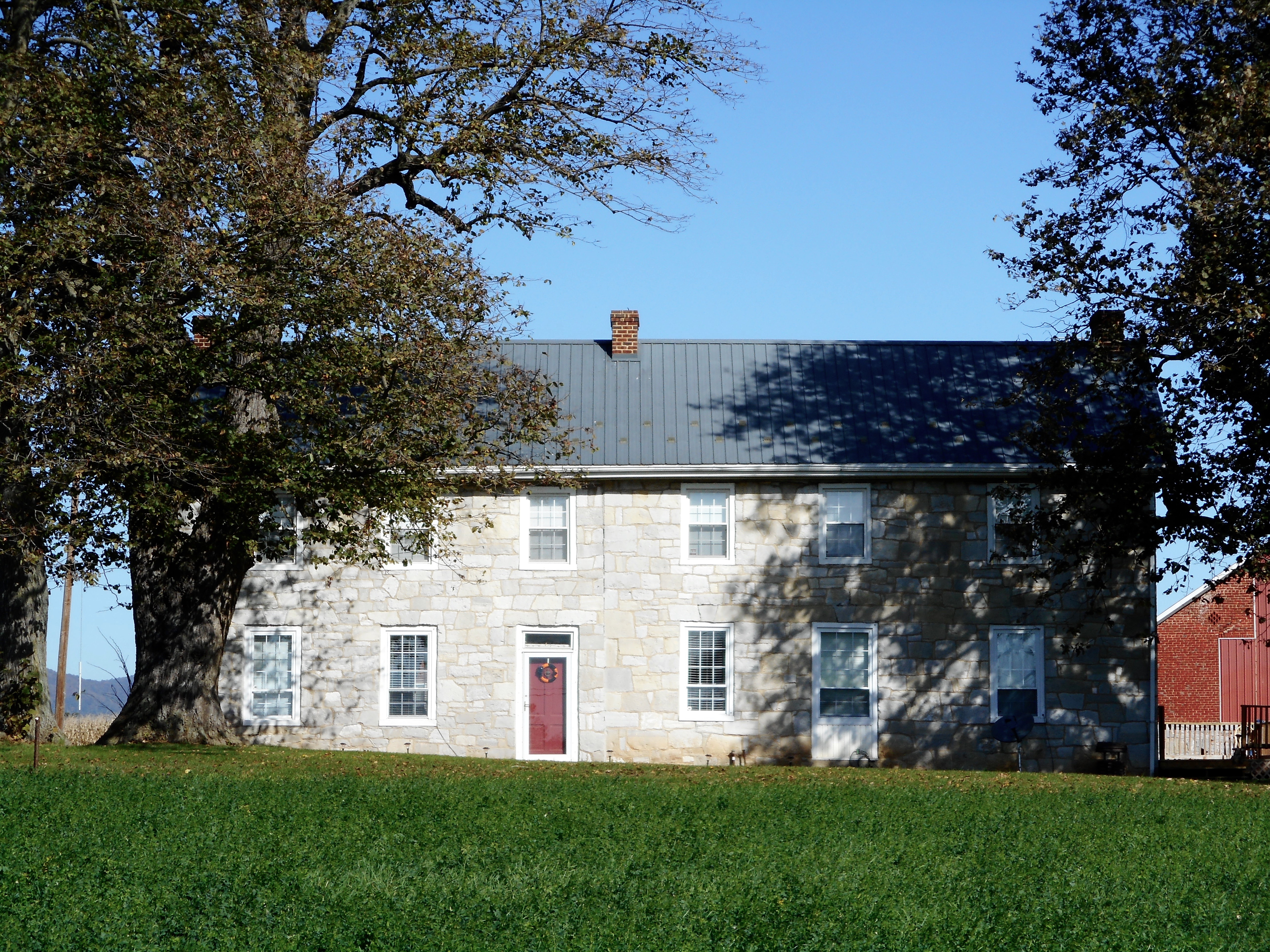

- Location within Pennsylvania Location within the United States
- Location: NE of Mercersburg at 8941 Kings Lane, Peters Township, Pennsylvania
- Coordinates: 39°50′21″N 77°51′11″W
- Area: 5 acres (2.0 ha)
- Built: c. 1820-1830
- NRHP reference No.: 80003498
- Added to NRHP: December 2, 1980

Church Hill Farm is a historic home and farm complex located at Peters Township in Franklin County, Pennsylvania. The house is a three-part, two-story stone-and-frame dwelling. It has 2 three-bay stone sections dated to the 1820s or 1830s, with a two-story, frame addition dated between 1840 and 1900. Also on the property are a contributing barn, out kitchen, corn crib, and wagon shed.

It was listed on the National Register of Historic Places in 1980.
