= Lasley =

Lasley is a surname. Notable people with the surname include:

- Bill Lasley (1902–1990), American baseball player
- Cameron Lasley (born 1982), American rapper
- David Lasley (1947-2021), American singer-songwriter
- Keith Lasley (born 1979), Scottish football player
- Jordan Lasley (born 1996), American football player

== See also ==
- Lashley (disambiguation)
