= LeMaster =

LeMaster is a surname. Notable people with the name include:

- Andy LeMaster (born 1975), American musician, songwriter, engineer
- Denny Lemaster (1939-2024), American baseball player
- Frank LeMaster (1952–2023), American football player
- Jim LeMaster (born 1946), American politician
- Johnnie LeMaster (1954-2013), American baseball player

== See also ==
- LeMasters (disambiguation), includes people with the surname LeMasters
