= Widow Donaldson Place =

Historic house in Pennsylvania, United States

- U.S. National Register of Historic Places
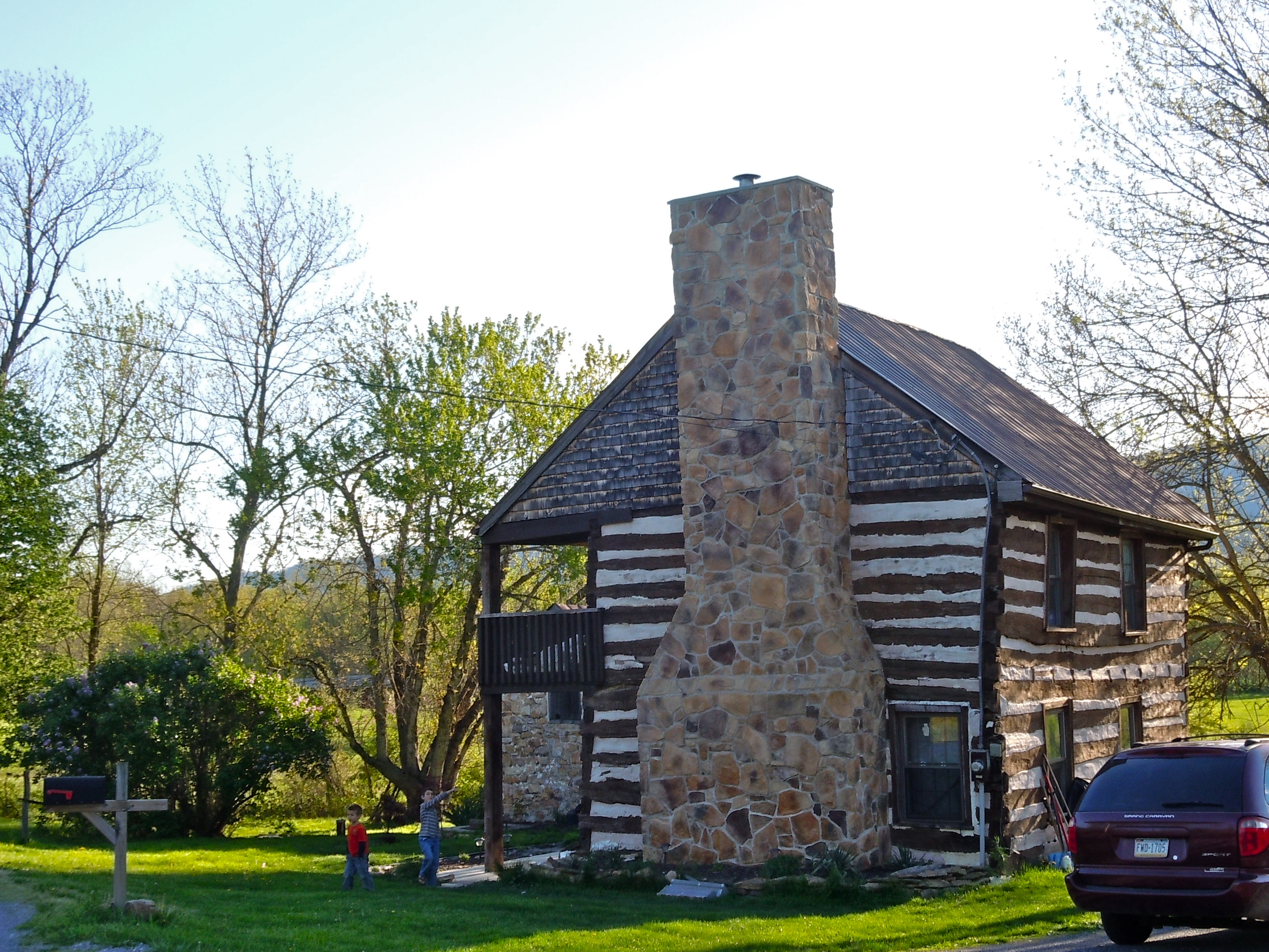
- Widow Donaldson Place, April 2011

- Location within Pennsylvania Location within the United States
- Location: 177 Bear Valley Road near Fort Loudon, Peters Township, Pennsylvania
- Coordinates: 39°54′48″N 77°53′45″W
- Area: 1 acre (0.40 ha)
- Built: c. 1775
- Architectural style: Log cabin style
- NRHP reference No.: 87001983
- Added to NRHP: November 5, 1987

Widow Donaldson Place is a historic home located at Peters Township in Franklin County, Pennsylvania. It was built about 1775, and is a two-story, log dwelling, measuring 24 feet by 20 feet. It has a full-length, two-story front porch and massive rubble sandstone chimney. Also on the property is a late-18th or 19th century summer kitchen.

It was listed on the National Register of Historic Places in 1987.
