= Buck Run (West Branch Conococheague Creek tributary) =

River in Pennsylvania, United States

Coordinates: 39°51′36″N 77°53′10″W

Buck Run (known locally as Dickey's Run) is an 8.8-mile-long (14.2 km) tributary of the West Branch Conococheague Creek in Franklin County, Pennsylvania. Buck Run rises along the eastern base of Tuscarora Mountain, just below Tuscarora Summit, and cuts through Buchanan's Birthplace State Park before meeting the West Branch Conococheague Creek north of Mercersburg.

== See also ==
- List of rivers of Pennsylvania
