= Warren Township, Franklin County, Pennsylvania =

Township in Pennsylvania, US

Coordinates: 39°48′29″N 77°57′25″W

- Township
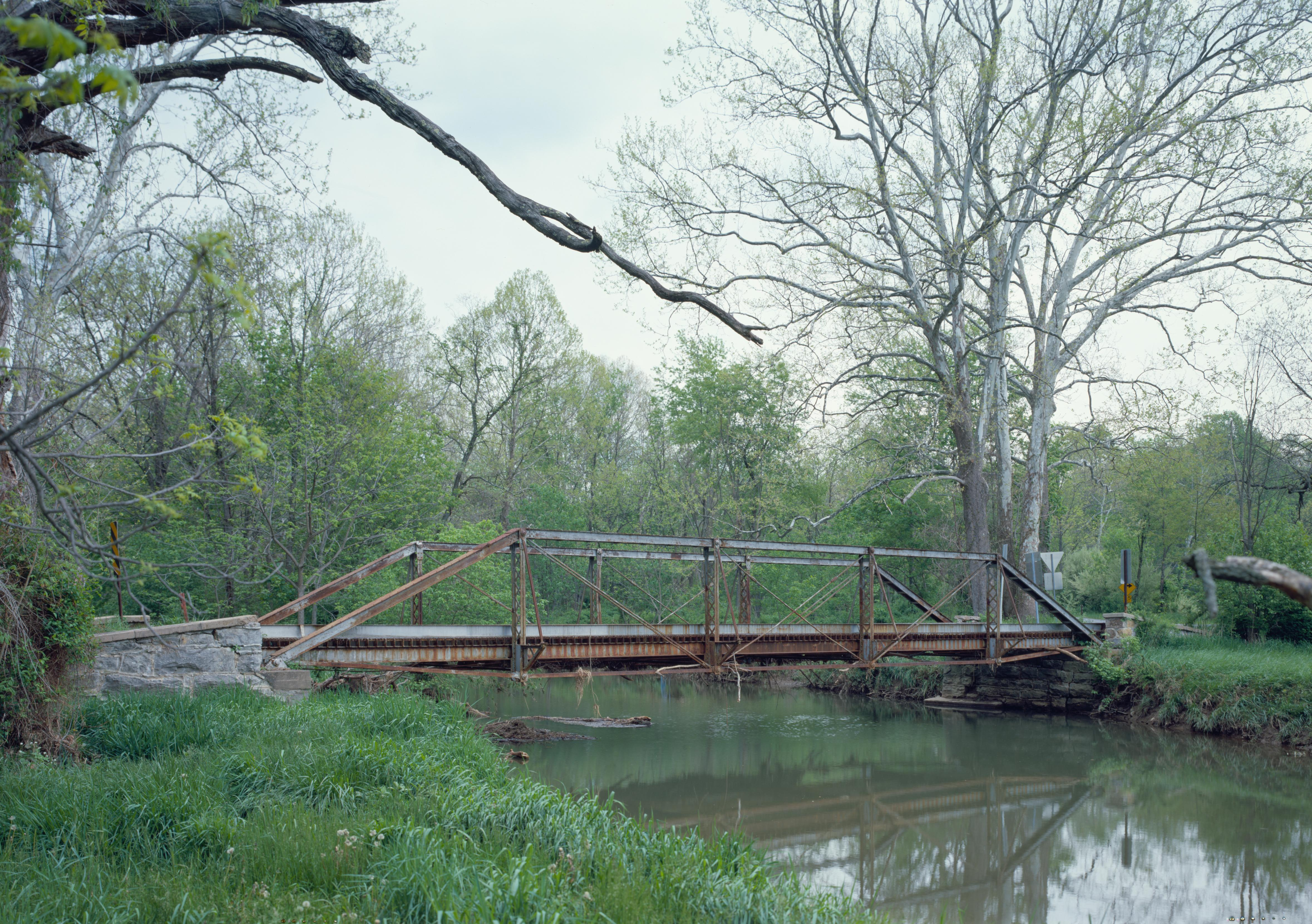
- Yeakle's Mill Bridge, completed 1888

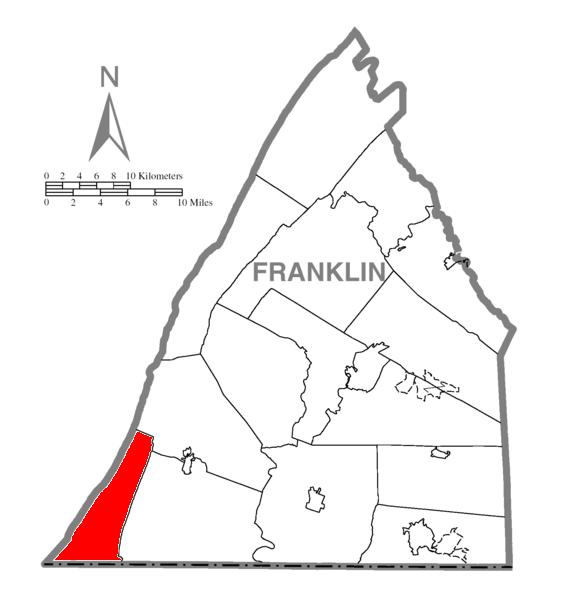
- Map of Franklin County, Pennsylvania highlighting Warren Township

- Map of Franklin County, Pennsylvania
- Country: United States
- State: Pennsylvania
- County: Franklin
- Incorporated: 1798

Area
  - Total: 30.63 sq mi (79.34 km^{2})
  - Land: 30.63 sq mi (79.34 km^{2})
  - Water: 0 sq mi (0.00 km^{2})

Population (2020)
  - Total: 328
  - Estimate (2016): 376
  - Density: 12.3/sq mi (4.74/km^{2})
- Time zone: UTC-5 (Eastern (EST))
  - Summer (DST): UTC-4 (EDT)
- Area code: 717
- FIPS code: 42-055-80992
- Website: https://warrentwpfranklin.com/

Warren Township is a township that is located in Franklin County, Pennsylvania, United States. The population was 328 at the time of the 2020 census.

== History ==
Warren Township's designation was derived from the name of Joseph Warren, an American soldier and doctor.

Yeakle's Mill Bridge was listed on the National Register of Historic Places in 1988.

== Geography ==
The township occupies the southwestern corner of Franklin County, bordered to the west by Fulton County and to the south by Washington County in the state of Maryland. The western boundary of the township follows the crest of Tuscarora Mountain as far as its southern end, and the eastern boundary follows the crest of Cove Mountain. The southern boundary is the Mason–Dixon line.

The settled part of the township occupies the space between the two mountains, known as Little Cove Valley, drained to the south by Little Cove Creek, a tributary of Licking Creek, which flows south across Maryland to the Potomac River.

Pennsylvania Route 456 runs the length of the township through the valley, leading north to Pennsylvania Route 16 in Peters Township, and continuing south in Maryland as unnumbered Hollow Road to Interstate 70 at the Potomac River.

According to the United States Census Bureau, the township has a total area of 30.6 square miles (79.3 km^{2}), all land.

=== Neighboring Townships ===
- Ayr Township (Fulton County), (northwest)
- Montgomery Township (east)
- Peters Township (northeast)
- Thompson Township (Fulton County), (west)

== Communities ==
- Sylvan
- Yeakle Mill

== Demographics ==
Historical population
Census	Pop.	Note	%±
2000	334		—
2010	369		10.5%
2020	328		−11.1%
2016 (est.)	376		1.9%
U.S. Decennial Census

As of the census of 2000, there were 334 people, 131 households, and 104 families residing in the township.

The population density was 10.9 people per square mile (4.2/km^{2}). There were 148 housing units at an average density of 4.8/sq mi (1.9/km^{2}).

The racial makeup of the township was 98.20% White, 0.30% African American, 0.30% from other races, and 1.20% from two or more races. Hispanic or Latino of any race were 0.60% of the population.

There were 131 households documented in the township, out of which 32.1% had children who were under the age of eighteen living with them, 72.5% were married couples living together, 2.3% had a female householder with no husband present, and 20.6% were non-families. Of all of the households documented, 19.1% were made up of individuals, and 12.2% had someone living alone who was sixty-five years of age or older.

The average household size was 2.55 and the average family size was 2.87.

Within the township, the population was spread out, with 23.1% of residents who were under the age of eighteen, 5.1% who were aged eighteen to twenty-four, 32.3% who were aged twenty-five to forty-four, 24.3% who were aged forty-five to sixty-four, and 15.3% who were sixty-five years of age or older. The median age was thirty-eight years.

For every one hundred females, there were 107.5 males. For every one hundred females who were aged eighteen or older, there were 105.6 males.

The median income for a household in the township was $39,375, and the median income for a family was $52,917. Males had a median income of $36,250 compared with that of $19,688 for females.

The per capita income for the township was $19,296.

Approximately 2.0% of families and 2.1% of the population were living below the poverty line, including 4.1% of those who were aged sixty-five or older. No one under the age of eighteen was living in poverty.
