= Lakeside, Pennsylvania =

- Unincorporated community Census designated place
- Location of Susquehanna County in Pennsylvania

- Location within Pennsylvania Location within the United States
- Coordinates: 41°51′21.6″N 75°39′28.8″W
- Country: United States
- State: Pennsylvania
- County: Susquehanna
- Township: New Milford
- Elevation: 1,473 ft (449 m)

Population
  - Estimate (2023): 106
- Time zone: UTC-5 (Eastern (EST))
  - Summer (DST): UTC-4 (EDT)
- GNIS feature ID: 2830822

Lakeside, Pennsylvania is an unincorporated community and census designated place (CDP) in New Milford Township, Susquehanna County, in the U.S. state of Pennsylvania.

== Demographics ==
Historical population
Census	Pop.	Note	%±
2023 (est.)	106
U.S. Decennial Census

The United States Census Bureau defined Lakeside as a census designated place in 2023.
