= Laurel Lake, Pennsylvania =

- Unincorporated community Census designated place
- Location of Susquehanna County in Pennsylvania

- Location within Pennsylvania Location within the United States
- Coordinates: 41°57′21.6″N 75°55′1.20″W
- Country: United States
- State: Pennsylvania
- County: Susquehanna
- Township: Silver Lake
- Elevation: 1,706 ft (520 m)

Population
  - Estimate (2023): 138
- Time zone: UTC-5 (Eastern (EST))
  - Summer (DST): UTC-4 (EDT)
- GNIS feature ID: 2830824

Laurel Lake, Pennsylvania is an unincorporated community and census designated place (CDP) in Silver Lake Township, Susquehanna County, in the U.S. state of Pennsylvania.

== Demographics ==
Historical population
Census	Pop.	Note	%±
2023 (est.)	138
U.S. Decennial Census

The United States Census Bureau defined Laurel Lake as a census designated place in 2023.
