= Lake Wallenpaupack Estates, Pennsylvania =

- Unincorporated community Census designated place
- Location within Pennsylvania Location within the United States
- Coordinates: 41°21′57.6″N 75°20′2.4″W
- Country: United States
- State: Pennsylvania
- County: Pike
- Township: Greene

Area
  - Total: 0.798 sq mi (2.07 km^{2})
  - Land: 0.729 sq mi (1.89 km^{2})
  - Water: 0.069 sq mi (0.18 km^{2})
- Elevation: 1,339 ft (408 m)
- Time zone: UTC-5 (Eastern (EST))
  - Summer (DST): UTC-4 (EDT)
- FIPS code: 42-41076
- GNIS feature ID: 2830821

Lake Wallenpaupack Estates is an unincorporated community and census designated place (CDP) in Greene Township, Pike County, in the U.S. state of Pennsylvania.

== Demographics ==
Historical population
Census	Pop.	Note	%±
U.S. Decennial Census

The United States Census Bureau defined Lake Wallenpaupack Estates as a census designated place in the 2023 American Community Survey.
