= Listie, Pennsylvania =

Unincorporated community in Pennsylvania, US

- Unincorporated community
- Location within Pennsylvania
- Coordinates: 40°01′41″N 79°00′48″W
- Country: United States
- State: Pennsylvania
- County: Somerset
- Elevation: 2,110 ft (640 m)
- Time zone: UTC-5 (Eastern (EST))
  - Summer (DST): UTC-4 (EDT)
- ZIP code: 15549
- Area code: 814
- GNIS feature ID: 1179450

Listie is an unincorporated community in Somerset County, Pennsylvania, United States. The community is located 3.7 miles (6.0 km) east-northeast of Somerset. Listie had a post office until September 28, 2002; it still has its own ZIP code, 15549.
