= Limestone, Pennsylvania =

Unincorporated community in Pennsylvania, US

- Unincorporated community
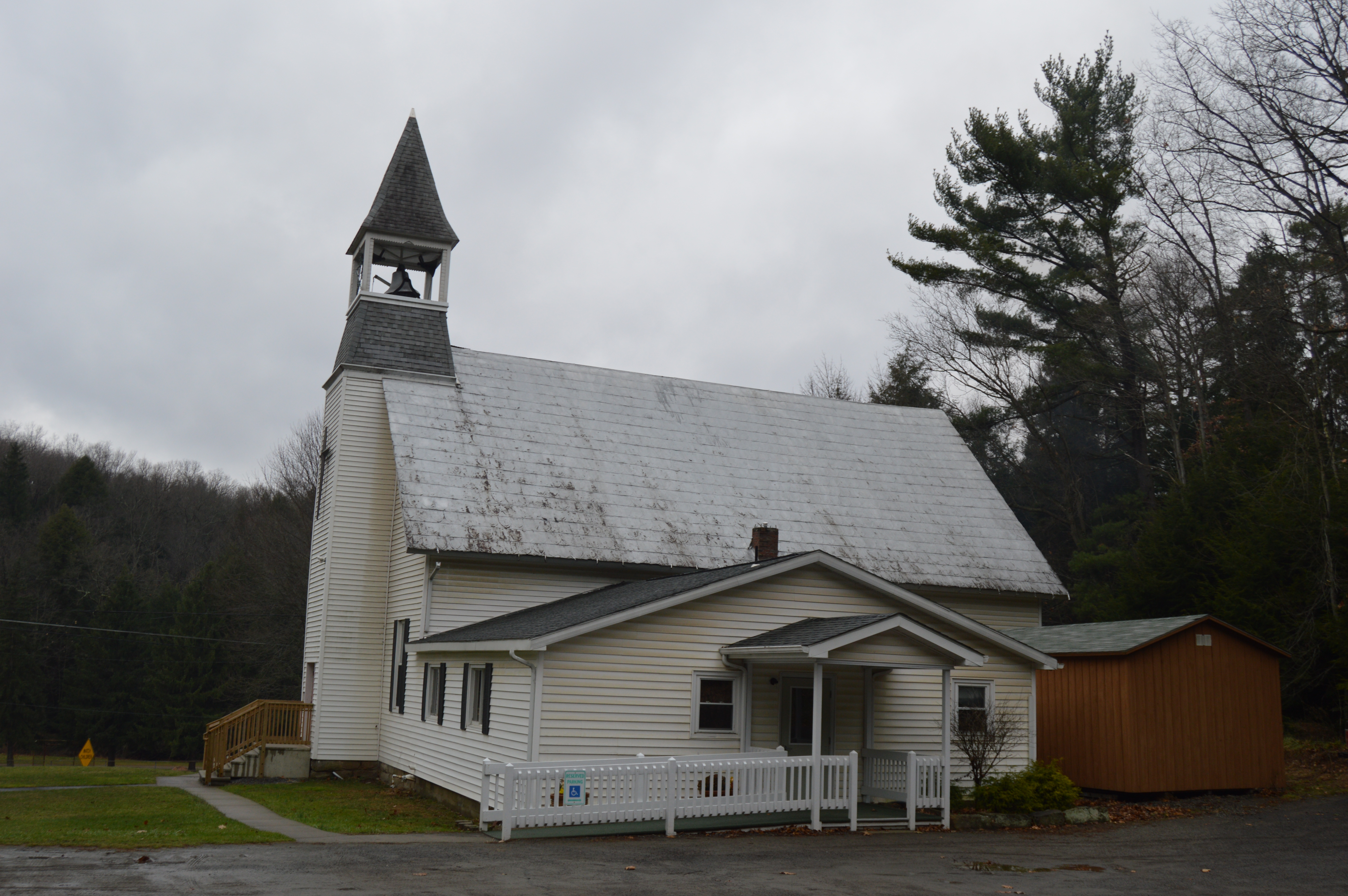
- First Baptist Church of Limestone

- Location within Pennsylvania
- Coordinates: 41°07′43″N 79°19′37″W
- Country: United States
- State: Pennsylvania
- County: Clarion
- Township: Limestone
- Elevation: 1,276 ft (389 m)
- Time zone: UTC-5 (Eastern (EST))
  - Summer (DST): UTC-4 (EDT)
- ZIP code: 16234
- Area code: 814
- GNIS feature ID: 1179355

Limestone is an unincorporated community in Clarion County, Pennsylvania, United States. The community is located on Pennsylvania Route 66, 6.7 miles (10.8 km) south-southeast of Clarion. Limestone has a post office with ZIP code 16234.
