= Lecontes Mills, Pennsylvania =

Unincorporated community in Pennsylvania, US

- Unincorporated community
- Location within Pennsylvania
- Coordinates: 41°04′59″N 78°17′00″W
- Country: United States
- State: Pennsylvania
- County: Clearfield
- Elevation: 1,496 ft (456 m)
- Time zone: UTC-5 (Eastern (EST))
  - Summer (DST): UTC-4 (EDT)
- ZIP code: 16850
- Area code: 814
- GNIS feature ID: 1179108

Lecontes Mills is an unincorporated community in Clearfield County, Pennsylvania, United States. The community is located along Pennsylvania Route 879, 9 miles (14 km) east-northeast of Clearfield. Lecontes Mills had a post office from February 29, 1856, until January 27, 1967; it still has its own ZIP code, 16850.
