= Yeakle's Mill Bridge =

- U.S. National Register of Historic Places
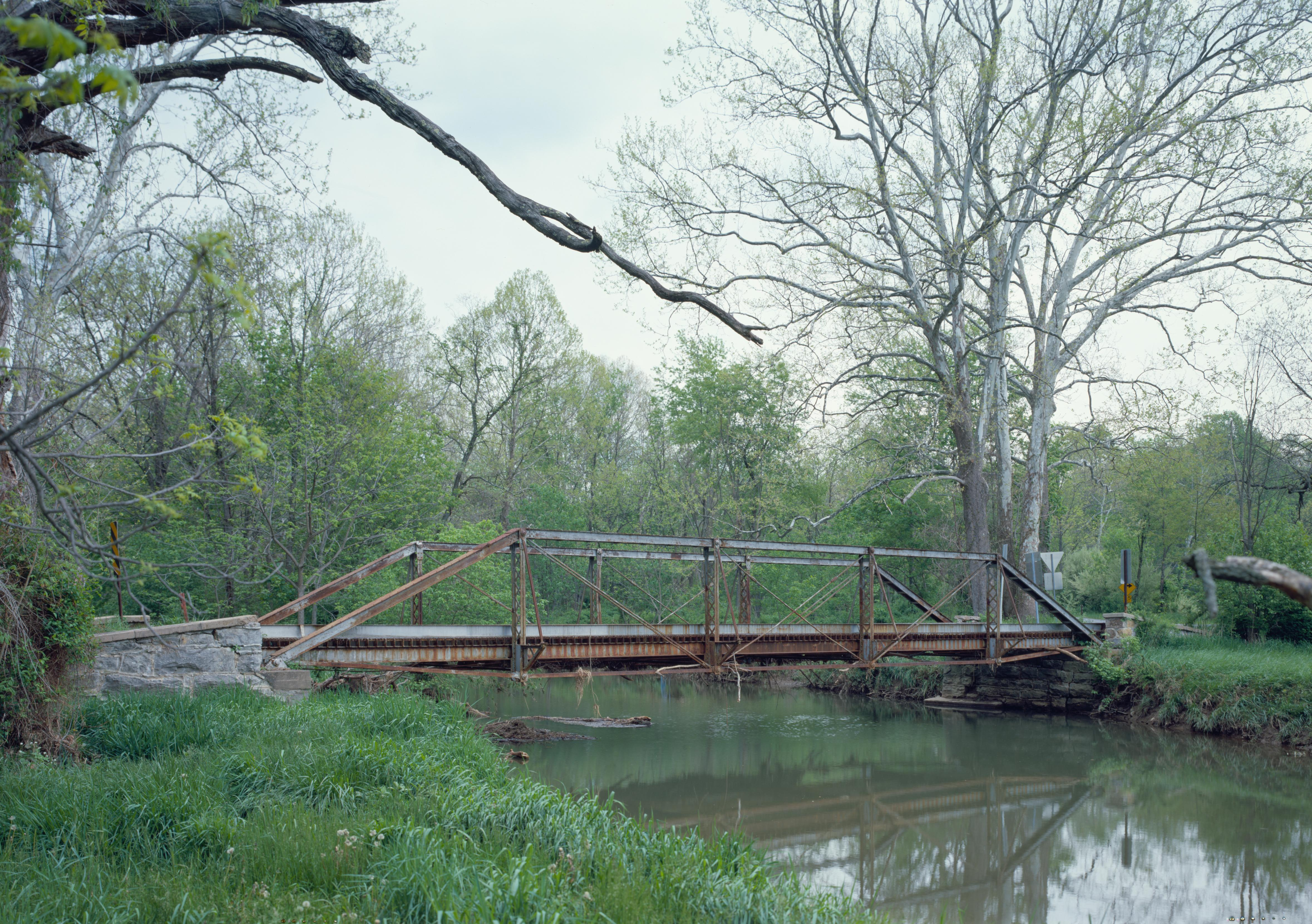
- Yeakle's Mill Bridge, May 2003

- Location within Pennsylvania Location within the United States
- Location: Legislative Route 28042 over Little Cove Creek, Warren Township, Pennsylvania
- Coordinates: 39°44′03″N 78°02′11″W
- Area: less than one acre
- Built: 1887–1888
- Built by: Pittsburgh Bridge Co.
- Architectural style: Pratt pony truss
- MPS: Highway Bridges Owned by the Commonwealth of Pennsylvania, Department of Transportation TR
- NRHP reference No.: 88002169
- Added to NRHP: November 14, 1988

Yeakle's Mill Bridge is a historic metal Pratt pony truss bridge carrying State Route 3026 (Mill Road) across Little Cove Creek in Warren Township, Franklin County, Pennsylvania. It is a 76-foot-long (23 m), single-span bridge. It was constructed in 1887–1888.

It was listed on the National Register of Historic Places in 1988.

== See also ==
- List of bridges documented by the Historic American Engineering Record in Pennsylvania
