= Lickingville, Pennsylvania =

Unincorporated community in Pennsylvania, US

- Unincorporated community
- Location within Pennsylvania
- Coordinates: 41°22′40″N 79°22′06″W
- Country: United States
- State: Pennsylvania
- County: Clarion
- Elevation: 1,588 ft (484 m)
- Time zone: UTC-5 (Eastern (EST))
  - Summer (DST): UTC-4 (EDT)
- ZIP code: 16332
- Area code: 814
- GNIS feature ID: 1209757

Lickingville is an unincorporated community in Clarion County, Pennsylvania, United States. The community is located along Pennsylvania Route 208, 9.3 miles (15.0 km) south-southeast of Tionesta. Lickingville had a post office until June 4, 2011; it still has its own ZIP code, 16332.
