= Limestone Township, Clarion County, Pennsylvania =

Township in Pennsylvania, US

Coordinates: 41°08′05″N 79°16′12″W

- Township
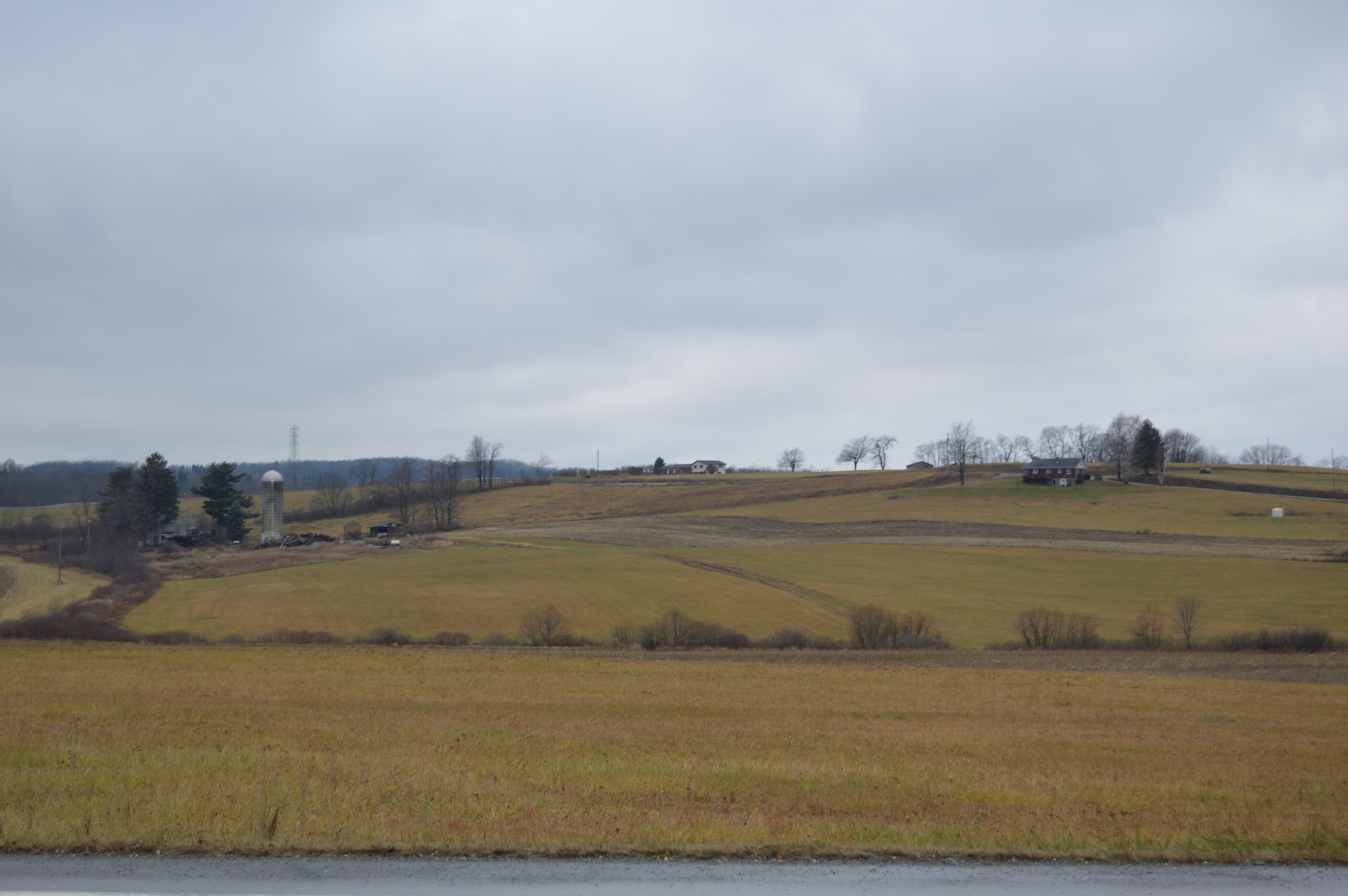
- Agricultural area south of Frogtown

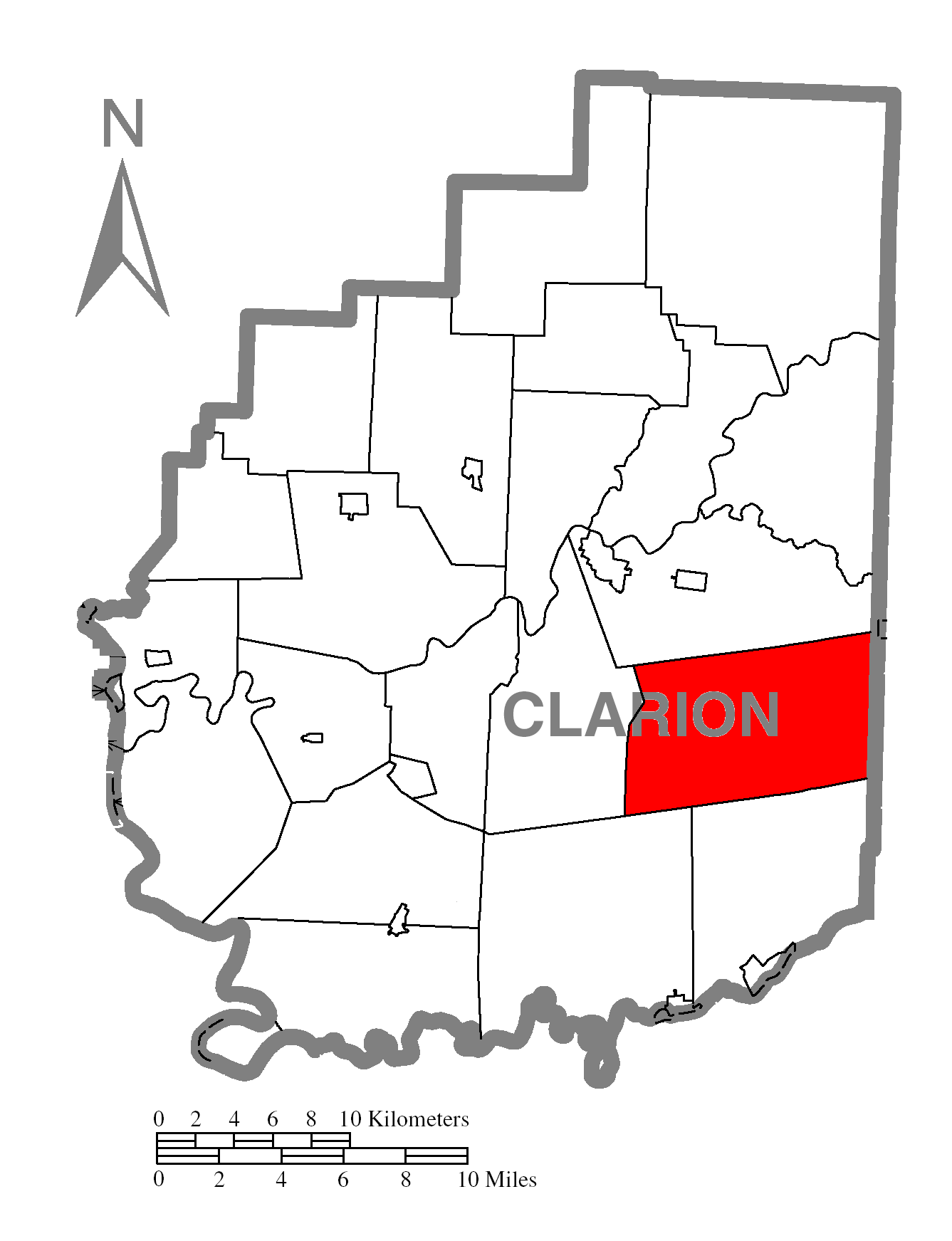
- Map of Clarion County, Pennsylvania highlighting Limestone Township

- Map of Clarion County, Pennsylvania
- Country: United States
- State: Pennsylvania
- County: Clarion
- Settled: 1800
- Incorporated: 1842

Area
  - Total: 37.95 sq mi (98.29 km^{2})
  - Land: 37.83 sq mi (97.99 km^{2})
  - Water: 0.12 sq mi (0.30 km^{2})

Population (2020)
  - Total: 1,870 ▲
  - Estimate (2022): 1,845
  - Density: 49.4/sq mi (19.1/km^{2})
- Time zone: UTC-5 (Eastern (EST))
  - Summer (DST): UTC-4 (EDT)
- FIPS code: 42-031-43344

Limestone Township is a township that is located in Clarion County, Pennsylvania, United States. The population was 1,870 at the time of the 2020 census, an increase from the figure of 1,858 tabulated in 2010.

== Geography ==
This township is located in southeastern Clarion County and is bordered on the east by Jefferson County. The unincorporated community of Limestone is located in the western part of the township on Pennsylvania Route 66 in the valley of Piney Creek.

According to the United States Census Bureau, the township has a total area of 38.0 square miles (98.3 km^{2}), of which 37.8 square miles (98.0 km^{2}) is land and 0.12 square miles (0.3 km^{2}), or 0.31%, is water.

== Demographics ==
Historical population
Census	Pop.	Note	%±
2010	1,858		—
2020	1,870		0.6%
2022 (est.)	1,845		−1.3%
U.S. Decennial Census

As of the census of 2000, there were 1,773 people, 669 households, and 519 families residing in the township.

The population density was 47.1 inhabitants per square mile (18.2/km^{2}). There were 725 housing units at an average density of 19.3/sq mi (7.4/km^{2}).

The racial makeup of the township was 99.61% White, 0.06% African American, 0.11% Asian, and 0.23% from two or more races.

There were 669 households, out of which 36.5% had children under the age of eighteen living with them; 69.1% were married couples living together, 4.9% had a female householder with no husband present, and 22.4% were non-families. 18.1% of all households were made up of individuals, and 7.6% had someone living alone who was sixty-five years of age or older.

The average household size was 2.65 and the average family size was 3.02.

Within the township, the population was spread out, with 24.8% of residents who were under the age of eighteen, 7.8% who were aged eighteen to twenty-four, 30.3% who were aged twenty-five to forty-four, 25.2% who were aged forty-five to sixty-four, and 11.9% who were sixty-five years of age or older. The median age was thirty-eight years.

For every one hundred females there were 104.7 males. For every one hundred females who were aged eighteen or older, there were 99.1 males.

The median income for a household in the township was $40,045, and the median income for a family was $45,368. Males had a median income of $30,691 compared with that of $22,022 for females.

The per capita income for the township was $18,887.

Approximately 4.2% of families and 6.1% of the population were living below the poverty line, including 6.5% of those who were under the age of eighteen and 4.3% of those who were aged sixty-five or older.
