= Lambertsville, Pennsylvania =

Unincorporated community in Pennsylvania, US

Lambertsville
- Unincorporated community
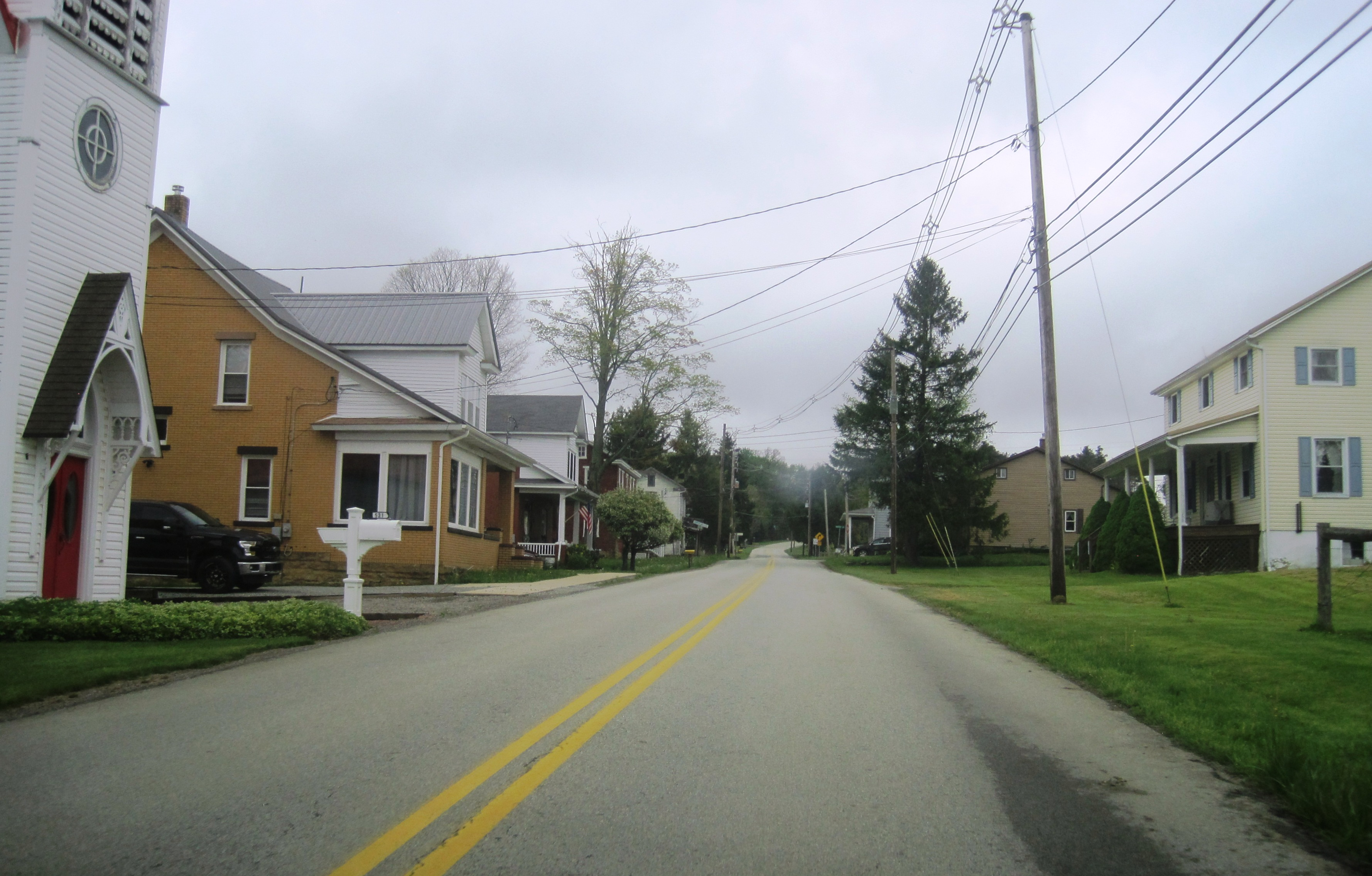
- Northbound Lambertsville Road in the center of the village

- Location within the state of Pennsylvania Lambertsville (the United States)
- Coordinates: 40°4′27″N 78°54′47″W
- Country: United States
- State: Pennsylvania
- County: Somerset
- Elevation: 2,244 ft (684 m)
- Time zone: UTC-5 (Eastern (EST))
  - Summer (DST): UTC-4 (EDT)
- GNIS feature ID: 1178828

Lambertsville is an unincorporated community and coal town in Stonycreek Township within Somerset County, Pennsylvania, United States.

The path of United Airlines Flight 93 flew directly over Lambertsville before crashing in a field southeast of the village on September 11, 2001. Witnesses to the low-flying plane in Lambertsville were the last to see it airborne and the first to place 911 calls after its crash. The Flight 93 National Memorial sits to the east of the village, though access to it is from U.S. Route 30 north of Lambertsville.
