= Lemasters, Pennsylvania =

Unincorporated community in Pennsylvania, US

- Unincorporated community
- Location within Pennsylvania Location within the United States
- Coordinates: 39°51′40″N 77°51′34″W
- Country: United States
- State: Pennsylvania
- County: Franklin
- Township: Peters
- Elevation: 577 ft (176 m)
- Time zone: UTC-5 (Eastern (EST))
  - Summer (DST): UTC-4 (EDT)
- ZIP code: 17231
- Area code: 717
- GNIS feature ID: 1179185

Lemasters is an unincorporated community in Peters Township in Franklin County, Pennsylvania, United States. Lemasters is located at the intersection of Lemar Road and Steele Avenue, northeast of Mercersburg.
