= Peters Township, Franklin County, Pennsylvania =

Township in Pennsylvania, US

Coordinates: 39°50′00″N 77°49′59″W

- Township
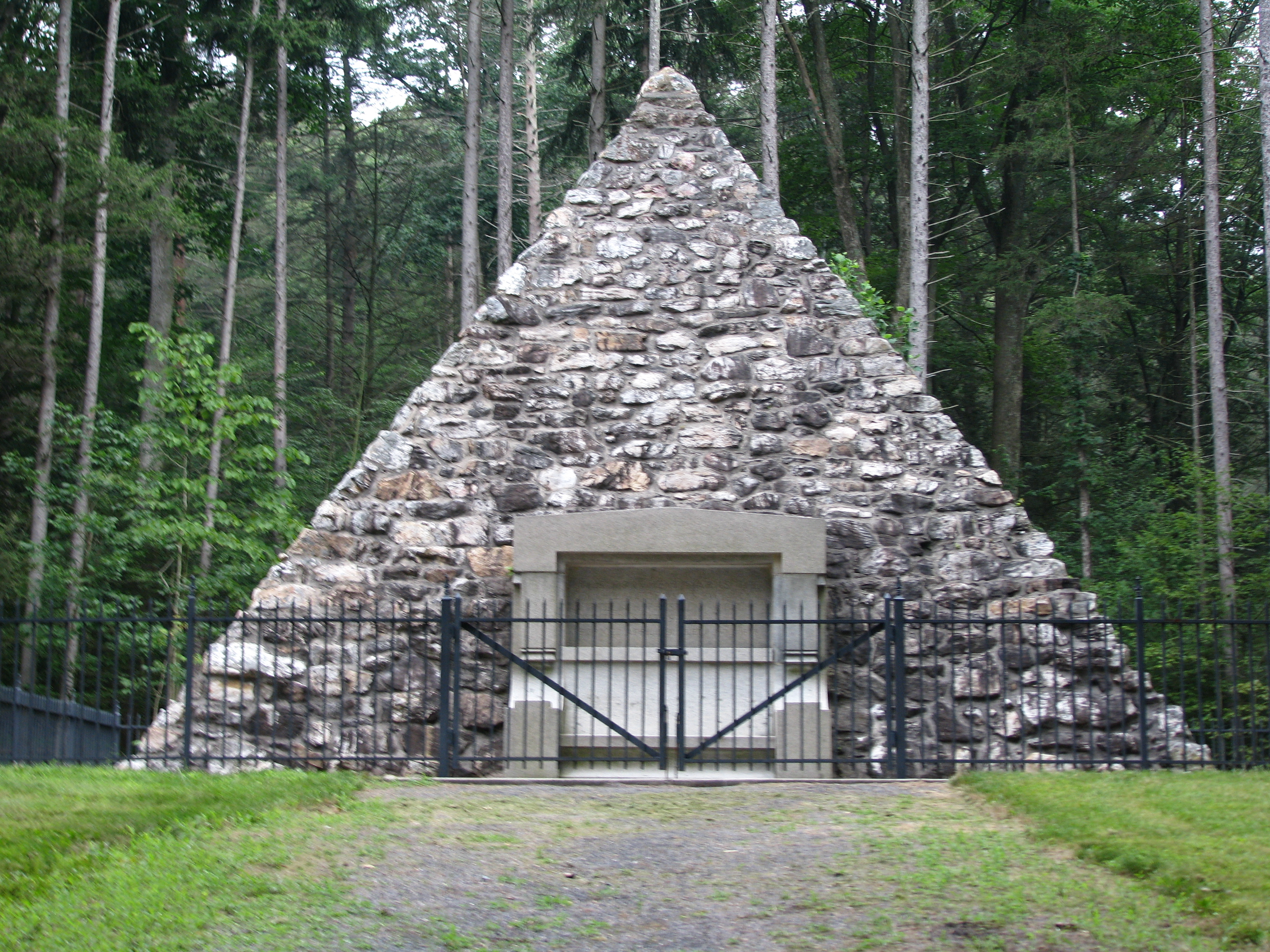
- Buchanan's Birthplace State Park is in the township.

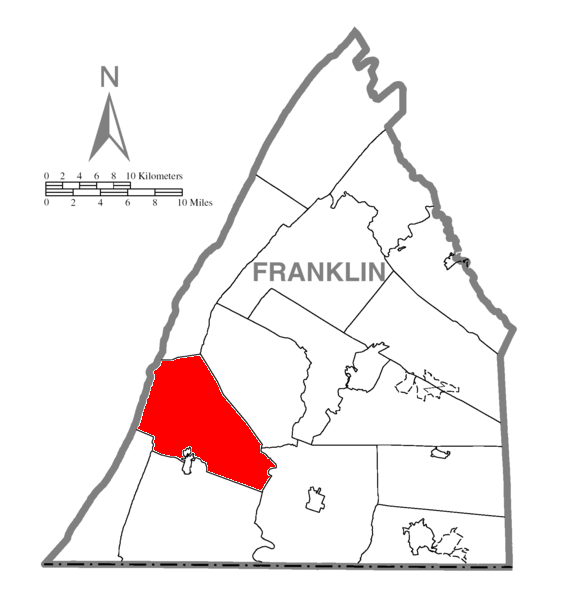
- Map of Franklin County, Pennsylvania highlighting Peters Township

- Map of Franklin County, Pennsylvania
- Country: United States
- State: Pennsylvania
- County: Franklin
- Settled: 1720
- Incorporated: 1751

Area
  - Total: 55.85 sq mi (144.65 km^{2})
  - Land: 55.81 sq mi (144.54 km^{2})
  - Water: 0.042 sq mi (0.11 km^{2})

Population (2020)
  - Total: 4,462
  - Estimate (2016): 4,449
  - Density: 79.7/sq mi (30.78/km^{2})
- Time zone: UTC-5 (Eastern (EST))
  - Summer (DST): UTC−4 (EDT)
- Area code: 717
- FIPS code: 42-055-59600
- Website: https://peterstownshipfcpa.gov/

Peters Township is a township in Franklin County, Pennsylvania, United States. The population was 4,462 at the 2020 census.

== History ==
The township has the name of Richard Peters (1744–1828), Pennsylvania jurist.

The Church Hill Farm, Widow Donaldson Place, Findlay Farm, McCoy–Shoemaker Farm, and the White House Inn are listed on the National Register of Historic Places.

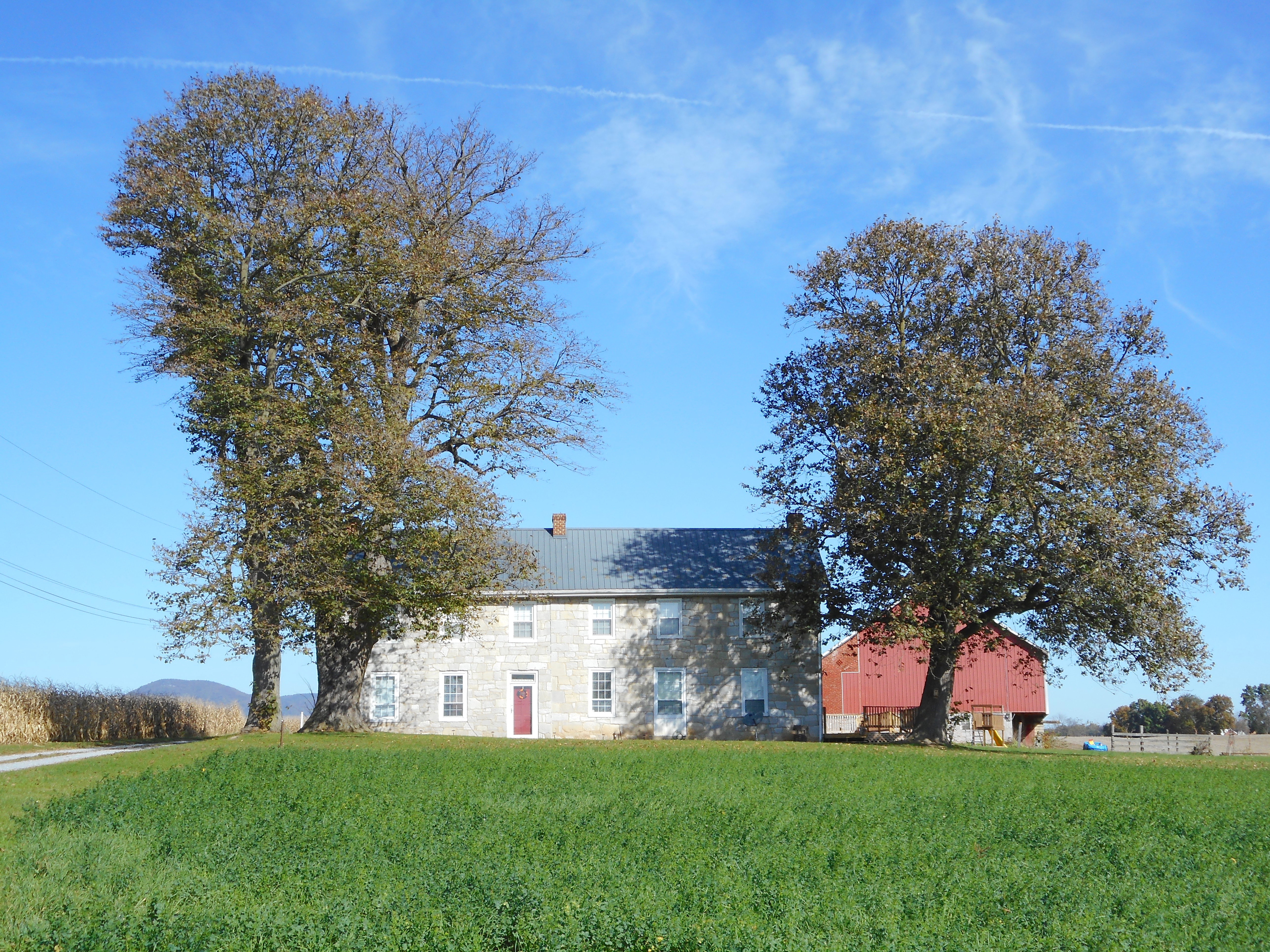
Church Hill Farm

== Geography ==
The township is in western Franklin County, bordered to the west by Fulton County. The borough of Mercersburg is along part of the southern border. The western border follows the crest of Tuscarora Mountain, while a portion of the eastern border follows Conococheague Creek, a tributary of the Potomac River. The West Branch of Conococheague Creek flows from north to south through the center of the township. Cove Mountain is a ridge that runs parallel to Tuscarora Mountain to the east.

U.S. Route 30 passes through the northern part of the township, passing through the unincorporated community of Fort Loudon. US-30 leads east to Chambersburg, the Franklin County seat, and west to McConnellsburg. Pennsylvania Route 75 crosses the center of the township, leading south into Mercersburg. It intersects US-30 at Fort Loudon and leads north towards Fannettsburg in the Path Valley. The unincorporated community of Cove Gap, the birthplace of President James Buchanan, is in the western part of the township. Other unincorporated places include Charlestown, Markes, Lemasters, Church Hill, and Upton.

According to the United States Census Bureau, the township has a total area of 55.9 square miles (144.7 km^{2}), of which 55.8 square miles (144.5 km^{2}) is land and 0.04 square miles (0.1 km^{2}), or 0.08%, is water.

=== Neighboring Townships ===
- Antrim Township (southeast)
- Ayr Township (Fulton County), (west)
- Metal Township (north)
- Montgomery Township (south)
- St. Thomas Township (east)
- Todd Township (Fulton County), (northwest)
- Warren Township (southwest)

== Communities ==
- Charlestown
- Cove Gap
- Dickey
- Dutchtown
- Fort Loudon
- Lemasters
- Markes
- Mercersburg Junction
- Upton

== Demographics ==
Historical population
Census	Pop.	Note	%±
2000	4,251		—
2010	4,430		4.2%
2020	4,462		0.7%
2016 (est.)	4,449		0.4%
U.S. Decennial Census

As of the census of 2000, there were 4,251 people, 1,622 households, and 1,270 families residing in the township. The population density was 76.1 inhabitants per square mile (29.4/km^{2}). There were 1,718 housing units at an average density of 30.7 per square mile (11.9/km^{2}). The racial makeup of the township was 97.81% White, 0.89% African American, 0.05% Native American, 0.12% Asian, 0.52% from other races, and 0.61% from two or more races. Hispanic or Latino of any race were 1.32% of the population.

There were 1,622 households, out of which 33.7% had children under the age of 18 living with them, 66.6% were married couples living together, 7.6% had a female householder with no husband present, and 21.7% were non-families. 17.5% of all households were made up of individuals, and 8.4% had someone living alone who was 65 years of age or older. The average household size was 2.62 and the average family size was 2.94.

In the township the population was spread out, with 24.8% under the age of 18, 7.2% from 18 to 24, 29.2% from 25 to 44, 25.5% from 45 to 64, and 13.3% who were 65 years of age or older. The median age was 38 years. For every 100 females, there were 97.6 males. For every 100 females age 18 and over, there were 95.6 males.

The median income for a household in the township was $41,740, and the median income for a family was $46,375. Males had a median income of $32,618 versus $23,285 for females. The per capita income for the township was $18,791. About 6.9% of families and 8.7% of the population were below the poverty line, including 10.3% of those under age 18 and 8.8% of those age 65 or over.

== Notable people ==
- James Buchanan, the 15th president of the United States, was born in Cove Gap in Peters Township. His birthplace has been protected as Buchanan's Birthplace State Park.
- Thomas A. Scott, ran the trains for the Union in the Civil War, later ensured the growth of the Pennsylvania Railroad to its position as the preeminent U.S. corporation. Born 1823.
