= Cove Gap, Pennsylvania =

Unincorporated community in Pennsylvania, US

Cove Gap
- Unincorporated community
- Cove Gap Cove Gap (the United States)
- Coordinates: 39°51′57″N 77°56′33″W
- Country: United States
- State: Pennsylvania
- County: Franklin
- Incorporated: May 30, 1795

Area
  - Total: 0.922 sq mi (2.39 km^{2})
- Elevation: 239 ft (73 m)

Population (2010)
  - Total: 64
  - Estimate (2016): 64
- Time zone: UTC-5 (EST)
  - Summer (DST): UTC-4 (EDT)

Cove Gap is an unincorporated community in Peters Township in Franklin County, in the U.S. state of Pennsylvania. The community is located along Pennsylvania Route 16 in the western portion of the township, near Buchanan's Birthplace State Park.

== History ==
In 1878, Cove Gap had approximately 50 inhabitants. A post office called Cove Gap was established in 1923, and remained in operation until 1938.

Buchanan's Birthplace State Park is located in Cove Gap and honors the 15th President of the United States, James Buchanan, who was born near the site on April 23, 1791.

Historical population
| Census | Pop. | Note | %± |
|---|---|---|---|
| 1860 | 50 | | — |
| 1870 | 107 | | 114.0% |
| 1880 | 100 | | −6.5% |
| 1890 | 109 | | 9.0% |
| 1900 | 20 | | −81.7% |
| 1910 | 59 | | 195.0% |
| 1920 | 69 | | 16.9% |
| 1930 | 60 | | −13.0% |
| 1940 | 68 | | 13.3% |
| 1950 | 201 | | 195.6% |
| 1960 | 156 | | −22.4% |
| 1970 | 79 | | −49.4% |
| 1980 | 78 | | −1.3% |
| 1990 | 69 | | −11.5% |
| 2000 | 68 | | −1.4% |
| 2010 | 64 | | −5.9% |
| 2016 (est.) | 64 | | 0.0% |
