= Renfrew Museum =

Renfrew Museum may refer to:

- Renfrew Museum and Park in Waynesboro, Pennsylvania
- Renfrew Community Museum in Renfrew, Scotland
- McDougall Mill Museum (informally referred to as Renfrew Museum) in Renfrew, Ontario

== See also ==
- Renfrew
