= Borough Hall =

Borough Hall may refer to:

- Brooklyn Borough Hall, New York
- Bronx Borough Hall, New York
- Queens Borough Hall, New York
- Staten Island Borough Hall, New York
- Borough Hall of the Borough of Waynesboro, Pennsylvania
- Edgewater Borough Hall, New Jersey
- Metuchen Borough Hall, New Jersey
- Borough Hall, Haddonfield, New Jersey
- Borough Hall, Bedford, England

== See also ==
- Court Street – Borough Hall (New York City Subway), station serving Brooklyn Borough Hall
- Seat of local government
