= HoPWF Television Championship =

Professional wrestling championship

Details
- Promotion: House of Pain Wrestling Federation
- Date established: 2004
- Current champion(s): LT
- Date won: November 20, 2004
Statistics
- First champion(s): LT

The HoPWF Television Championship was a secondary professional wrestling title in the House of Pain Wrestling Federation promotion. It was first won by LT who defeated Cabbie in Waynesboro, Pennsylvania on November 20, 2004. The title was defended primarily in the Mid-Atlantic and East Coast, most often in Hagerstown, Maryland, however the title was abandoned the following year.

== Title history ==
Wrestler:	Times:	Date:	Location:	Notes:
LT	1	November 20, 2004	Waynesboro, Pennsylvania	Defeated Cabbie to become the first champion.
The title is abandoned in 2005.
