= Andrew K. Stake =

American politician (died 1876)

Member of the Maryland House of Delegates from the Washington County district
- In office 1874–1874 Serving with Alonzo Berry, George Freaner, W. H. Grimes
- Preceded by: Charles Ardinger, David H. Newcomer, Moses Whitson, Augustus H. Young
- Succeeded by: Joseph Farrow, Henry Ranger, J. McPherson Scott, Lewis C. Smith
- In office 1860–1861 Serving with John C. Brining, James Coudy, Martin Eakle, George Freaner, Lewis P. Firey
- Preceded by: John F. Gray, William A. Riddlemoser, George C. Rohrer, Andrew R. Schnebly, John Wesley Summers
- Succeeded by: John Van Lear Findlay, F. Dorsey Herbert, George Pearson, Samuel Rohrer, John J. Thomas
- In office 1849–1849 Serving with Jeremiah S. Besore, Elie Crampton, Elias Davis, Jacob Smith
- Preceded by: James Biays, Hezekiah Boteler, Robert Fowler, George French, George L. Zeigler
- Succeeded by: George Cushwa, Wilfred D. McCardell, Edward M. Mealey, George Strause, John Wolf

Personal details
- Died: April 15, 1876 Hagerstown, Maryland, U.S.
- Resting place: Williamsport, Maryland, U.S.
- Party: Whig; Union; Democratic
- Spouse(s): Adaline Oster (died 1872) Elizabeth Hawken (m. 1873; died 1873)
- Children: 1
- Occupation: Politician; businessman

Andrew K. Stake (died April 15, 1876) was an American politician from Maryland. He served in the Maryland House of Delegates in 1849, from 1860 to 1861, and in 1874.

== Career ==
Stake was elected as a Whig member of the Maryland House of Delegates, representing Washington County, in 1849. The election was contested by the Democratic candidate Mr. Wolf. He served in the 1849 session. He was chairman of the ways and means committee. He served as an American Party member of the House of Delegates from 1860 to 1861. He was elected as a Democrat in 1873 for the House of Delegates and served in the body in 1874. In March 1874, Stake, while serving on the legislature, was found guilty for giving away liquor on election day. He was fined US$50 and additional costs.

In 1854, Stake became superintendent of the Chesapeake and Ohio Canal. He was elected to the board of directors of the canal in 1868. Between 1857 and 1858, Stake was appointed by Governor Thomas Watkins Ligon as lieutenant colonel to the 45th Maryland state militia. In 1873, he was secretary of the Agricultural Club of Washington County.

== Personal life ==
Stake married Adaline Oster, daughter of Daniel Oster. She died in 1872. He then married Elizabeth Hawken, daughter of Samuel Hawken, of Ohio on January 15, 1873. She died in the summer of 1873. His son Samuel died in 1874 following an accidental self-inflicted gunshot.

Stake died of a stroke on April 15, 1876, at the home of a previous tenant in Hagerstown. He was buried in Williamsport.
