= George Freaner =

American politician (1831–1878)

Member of the Maryland House of Delegates from the Washington County district
- In office 1874–1876 Serving with Alonzo Berry, W. H. Grimes, Andrew K. Stake
- Preceded by: Charles Ardinger, David H. Newcomer, Moses Whitson, Augustus H. Young
- Succeeded by: Joseph Farrow, Henry Ranger, J. McPherson Scott, Lewis C. Smith

Member of the Maryland House of Delegates from the Washington County district
- In office January 1, 1860 – March 7, 1860 Serving with John C. Brining, James Coudy, Martin Eakle, Andrew K. Stake
- Preceded by: John F. Gray, William A. Riddlemoser, George C. Rohrer, Andrew R. Schnebly, John Wesley Summers
- Succeeded by: Lewis P. Firey

Personal details
- Born: January 20, 1831 Washington County, Maryland, U.S.
- Died: November 10, 1878 (aged 47) New York City, U.S.
- Resting place: Rose Hill Cemetery
- Party: Democratic
- Spouse: Sallie A. Murray (m. 1871)
- Children: 2
- Education: Dickinson College
- Occupation: Politician; lawyer; writer; newspaper editor

George Freaner (January 20, 1831 – November 10, 1878) was an American politician and lawyer from Maryland. In the 1850s, he lived in California and was associated with papers there. He served as a member of the Maryland House of Delegates in 1860 before serving as an officer in the Confederate States Army. He served again in the Maryland House of Delegates from 1874 to 1876.

== Early life and family ==
George Freaner was born on January 20, 1831, in Hagerstown, Maryland, to Sarah (née Chambers) and Henry Freaner. His cousin John A. Freaner was deputy sheriff of San Francisco. His cousin James L. Freaner was a journalist who was reportedly killed by the Pit River Tribe. His brother U. B. Freaner was a newspaper publisher.

Freaner graduated from Hagerstown Academy. He entered Dickinson College in 1848, but left in 1851 to pursue studying law. He then studied law under Alexander Neill Sr. of Hagerstown He was admitted to the bar in Hagerstown.

== Career ==
In 1852, Freaner moved to California. In 1853, he published Union, a newspaper that grew out of the Mountain Herald, in Yreka. He also served as the paper's editor. He then moved to San Francisco and worked as a writer of editorials in the San Francisco Herald and as associate editor of the Oakland Times and Transcript. He also practiced law in San Francisco and in Oakland. He was one of California's presidential electors of James Buchanan in 1856. He then became a law partner of Robert Wason and George W. Smith Jr. of Hagerstown.

In 1857, Freaner returned to Hagerstown and began practicing law there, remaining associated with Wason and Smith. In 1858, he became an editor and part owner of The Mail in Hagerstown. In 1859, he was elected as a Democrat to the Maryland House of Delegates, representing Washington County. He served as chairman of the elections committee and investigated the Plug Uglies. He resigned his seat towards the end of the session on March 7, 1860, after he was informed he wasn't constitutionally eligible to serve in the body since he was not a resident of Maryland three years prior to the election. He then returned to his law practice.

Freaner fled Maryland in September 1861 to join the Confederate States Army as an aide to J. E. B. Stuart. He then served as an adjutant of a regiment under Luke Tiernan Brien. He was appointed as first lieutenant and adjutant of the 1st Virginia Cavalry Regiment on October 4, 1862. On November 20, 1863, he was commissioned as a major. He later was an assistant adjutant general of the brigade from December 7, 1863, to May 12, 1864. In 1863, he also served as judge advocate on a military court. He served on the staff of General Stuart until his death. On May 14, 1864, he served as assistant adjutant general on the staff of Fitzhugh Lee. From August 11, 1864, to January 19, 1865, he served as assistant adjutant general and assistant inspector general on the staff of Wade Hampton III. He was then again attached to Fitzhugh Lee's command. On March 27, 1865, he became assistant adjutant general to Wade Hampton. He was paroled in Winchester, Virginia, on April 24, 1865.

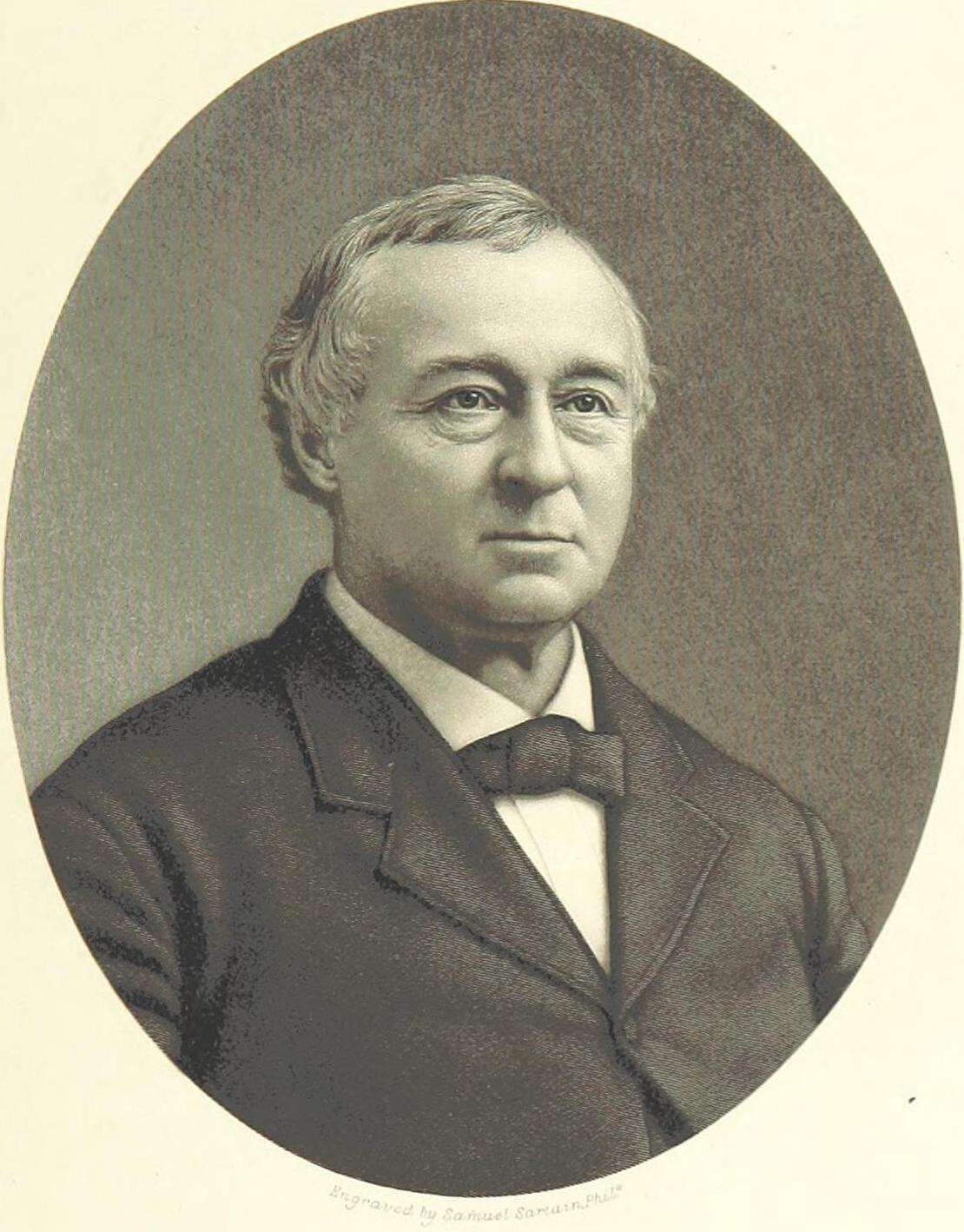
Engraving of Andrew K. Syester

Following the war, Freaner returned to Hagerstown and continued his law practice. In 1874, he served again as a member of the Maryland House of Delegates, representing Washington County. He served on the federal relations committee and was a member of the ways and means committee. He was a delegate to the 1876 Democratic National Convention. He started the law practice Syester & Freaner with Andrew K. Syester in 1866. They continued their practice until his death. In 1867, he was appointed as auditor of the Circuit Court of Washington County. He remained in that role until his death. He was appointed by Governor Oden Bowie as trustee of the Washington County Confederate Cemetery, a portion of the Rose Hill Cemetery established for the graves of Confederate soldiers. He also served as the cemetery's treasurer.

== Personal life ==
Freaner married Sallie A. (née Fechtig) Murray, daughter of Mary E. and George Fechtig, of Hagerstown on January 19, 1871. They had two daughters, Jessie and Lucie Dubois. He was a member of the Society of the Army and Navy of the Confederate States.

Freaner died of a heart ailment on November 10, 1878, in New York City. He was buried in Rose Hill Cemetery. One of his pallbearers was Henry Kyd Douglas.
