= Alexander Hamilton House =

Historic house in Pennsylvania, United States

- U.S. National Register of Historic Places
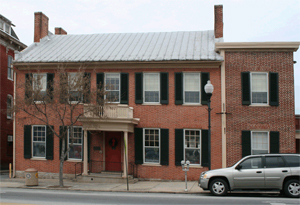
- Alexander Hamilton Memorial Free Library

- Location within Pennsylvania Location within the United States
- Location: 45 E. Main St., Waynesboro, Pennsylvania
- Coordinates: 39°45′18″N 77°34′35″W
- Area: 0.4 acres (0.16 ha)
- Built: 1814
- Built by: Bittinger, Mr.
- Architectural style: Georgian, Georgian vernacular
- NRHP reference No.: 80003501
- Added to NRHP: June 27, 1980

The Alexander Hamilton House is a historic home located at 45 East Main Street in Waynesboro, Franklin County, Pennsylvania. It is now operated as the Alexander Hamilton Memorial Free Library. The house and library are named for Alexander Hamilton, a local Waynesboro land speculator and wagon maker who owned the house (not the Alexander Hamilton on the $10 bill). It remained in his family for a century. The house was listed on the National Register of Historic Places on June 27, 1980.

Built around 1816 by John Bittinger, the two-story, five-bay Georgian-style, 16-room brick house has dual fireplace chimneys. It was purchased by Waynesboro's Alexander Hamilton in 1842. The house remained in the family until the 1943 death of Hamilton's granddaughter, Jane Stover Yost. She bequeathed the property to the Borough of Waynesboro for the town's first permanent public library.

The McCleary house, once located on the east side of the library, was demolished to make way for a library wing added in 1987. The back yard contains a summer kitchen from the Hamilton era. It also has some old gristmill grinding stones donated by Sammy Stoner. The brick courtyard and flower gardens are open to visitors.
