= Jeremiah S. Besore =

American politician (1812–1888)

Member of the Maryland House of Representatives from the Washington County district
- In office 1849–1849 Serving with Elie Crampton, Elias Davis, Jacob Smith, Andrew K. Stake
- Preceded by: James Biays, Hezekiah Boteler, Robert Fowler, George French, George L. Zeigler
- Succeeded by: George Cushwa, Wilfred D. McCardell, Edward M. Mealey, George Strause, John Wolf

Personal details
- Born: January 30, 1812 Waynesboro, Pennsylvania, U.S.
- Died: February 1, 1888 (aged 76) Smithsburg, Maryland, U.S.
- Party: Democratic (Locofocos)
- Spouse: Ann Elizabeth Shank
- Children: 2
- Occupation: Politician; farmer; educator; businessman

Jeremiah S. Besore (January 30, 1812 – February 1, 1888) was an American politician from Maryland. He served in the Maryland House of Delegates in 1849.

== Early life ==
Jeremiah S. Besore was born on January 30, 1812, in Waynesboro, Pennsylvania.

== Career ==
In 1839, Besore was secretary of the organizers of The Zion's Sabbath School in Waynesboro. He was the school's first president. He moved to Smithsburg, Maryland, to engage in merchandising and then became a farmer. Later in life, he was a property assessor.

Besore was a reformer and was associated with the Locofocos faction of the Democratic Party in 1849. He served in the Maryland House of Delegates, representing Washington County, in 1849. He ran again for state delegate in 1875 as a Democrat, but lost.

Besore was appointed as postmaster of Smithsburg in 1855.

== Personal life ==
Besore married Ann Elizabeth Shank, daughter of Adam Shank. They had two children, George and Lorena. He was a member of the Lutheran church in Smithsburg. He became the Sunday school supervisor in 1862 and became an elder of the church in 1884.

Besore died of pneumonia on February 1, 1888, at his home in Smithsburg.
