= Four Locks =

Coordinates: 39.615317°N 77.948333°W

Four Locks is a former small community which is now part of the Chesapeake and Ohio Canal National Historical Park. It was once a thriving community of homes and businesses in Washington County, Maryland that supported the Chesapeake and Ohio Canal from the mid-19th century, until its closure in the 1920s. In its heyday, the small community consisted of two stores, two warehouses, a dry dock for boat repair, a school, and post office, plus about a dozen houses.

== Early history ==
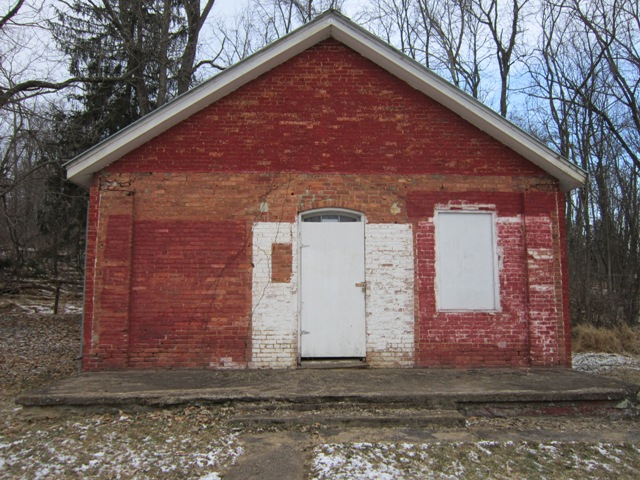
The schoolhouse at Four locks

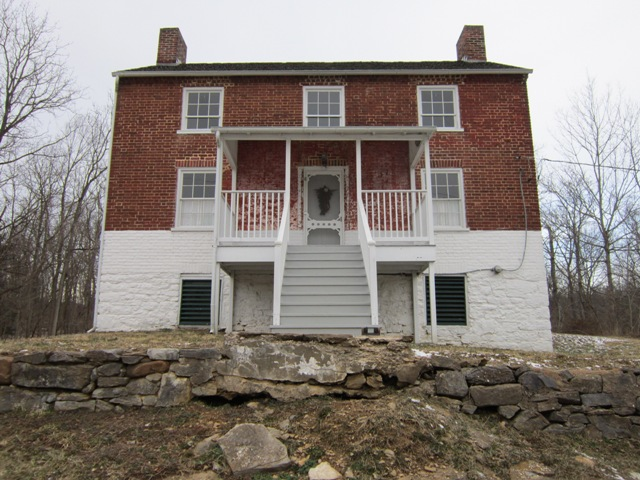
Lockhouse 49 at four locks

Located on the small peninsula known as Prather's Neck, Four Locks was named for the series of four canal locks – 47 through 50 – of the Chesapeake and Ohio Canal, built at the site between 1836 and 1838, to avoid a four-mile loop in the Potomac River and to handle a 33-foot difference in elevation. In time, a close-knit community supporting the canal thrived at the site, and continued for the life of canal operations. Because of its location about midway between Cumberland, Maryland and Washington, D.C., canal boats frequently stopped here for repairs and supplies. Several families, including the Taylors, Flynns, Myers, Bowers, and Hassetts had homes here for several generations during the canal era.

== Civil War ==
Though discussion of secession seemed to threaten Maryland's place in the Union, nearby Clear Spring, along with Four Locks, witnessed a number of pro-Union meetings, beginning as early as January 1861. Some 200 citizens assembled in Four Locks on January 31, 1861, and raised a 113-foot "Union Pole", topped with a streamer bearing the phrase "The Union Forever." Several prominent locals, including Lewis P. Firey, spoke to the assembly, which frequently throughout the speeches, erupted in "the wildest outbursts of applause". Late that same summer, several residents began enlisting in the units that formed in nearby Clear Spring.

Later during the war, on July 27, 1864, Four Locks was in the path of Confederate cavalry en route to Chambersburg, Pennsylvania. A warehouse and two stores were burned here, by the Confederates, on that day. While here, word was received that Pennsylvania militia was moving to intercept the Confederate force. Confederate forces then moved from this point to gain the upper hand, and forced the militia back into Pennsylvania with relative ease.

== Four Locks today ==
After the canal closed in 1924, the community declined and all but disappeared. As part of the C&O Canal National Historical Park, a few historic buildings and interpretive signs give visitors a glimpses into the canal's heyday. The lockhouse at Four Locks (Lock 49) has been rehabilitated and is available for overnight visits through the "Canal Quarters" program operated by the C&O Canal Trust. The building is furnished in the style of the early 1920s, with baseboard heating and a small stove. It has two levels, two bedrooms, and sleeps eight.

== Gallery ==
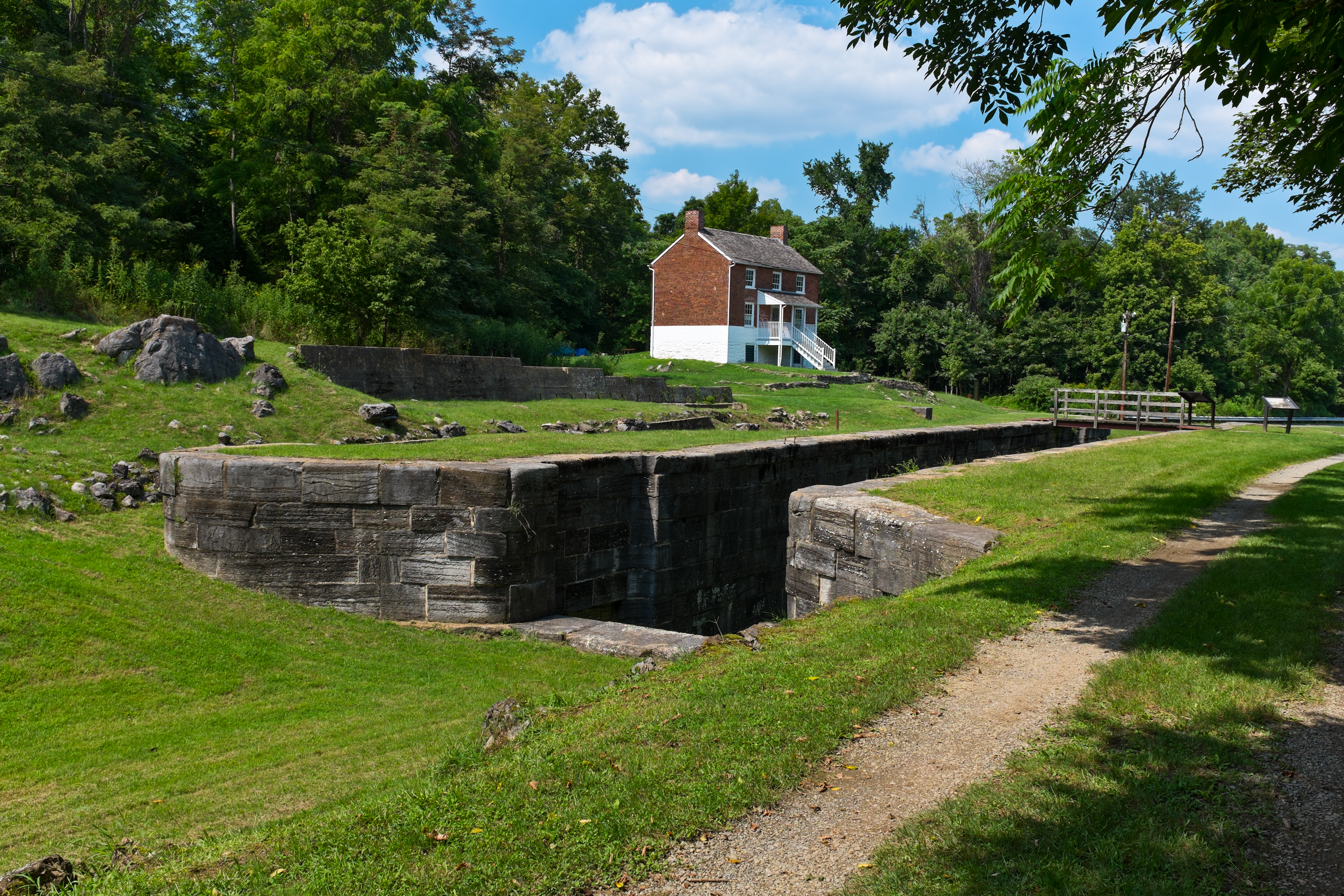
Lock 49.

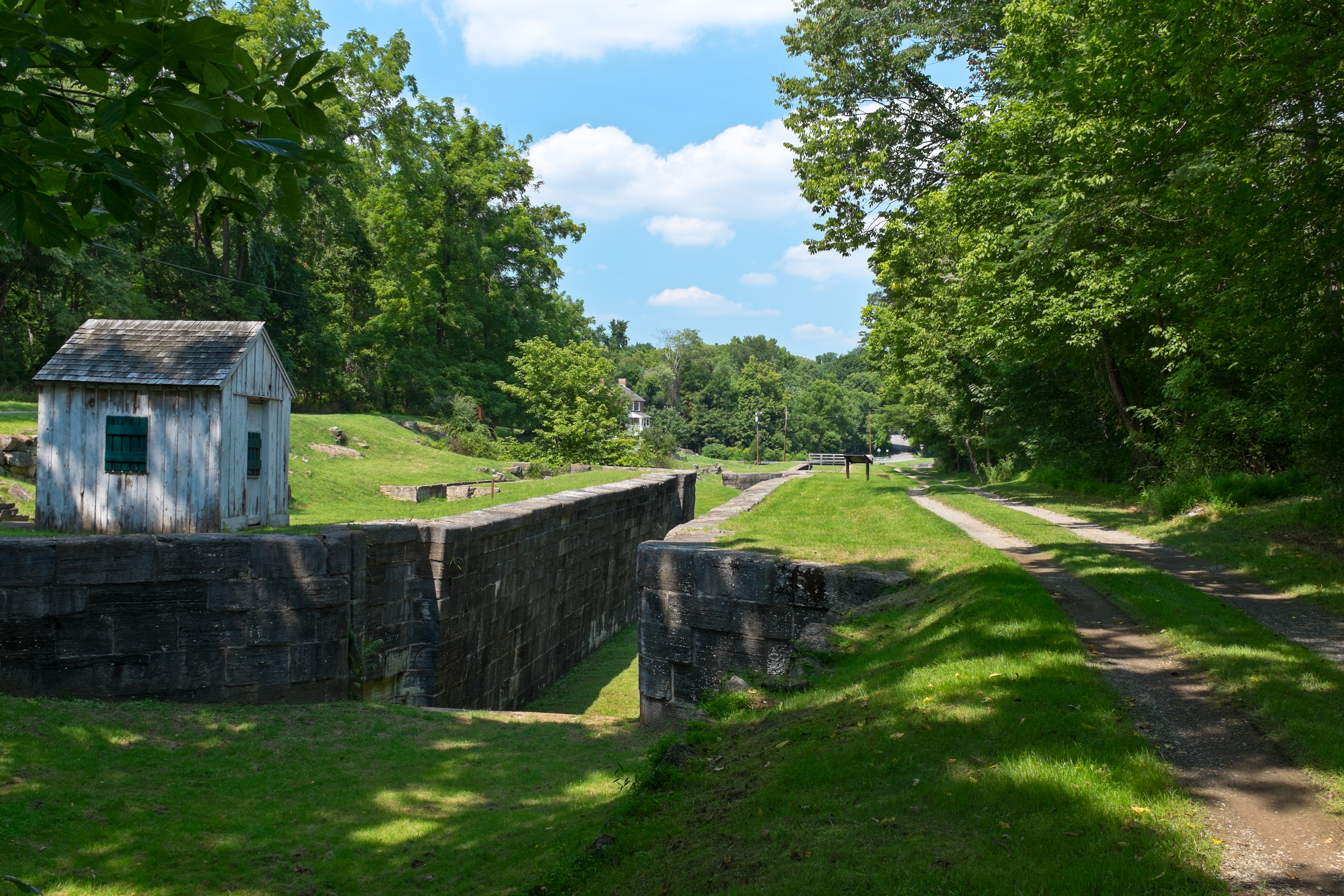
Lockkeeper's shanty, to look out for boats. Lock 50, with Locks 49 and 48 in the background.

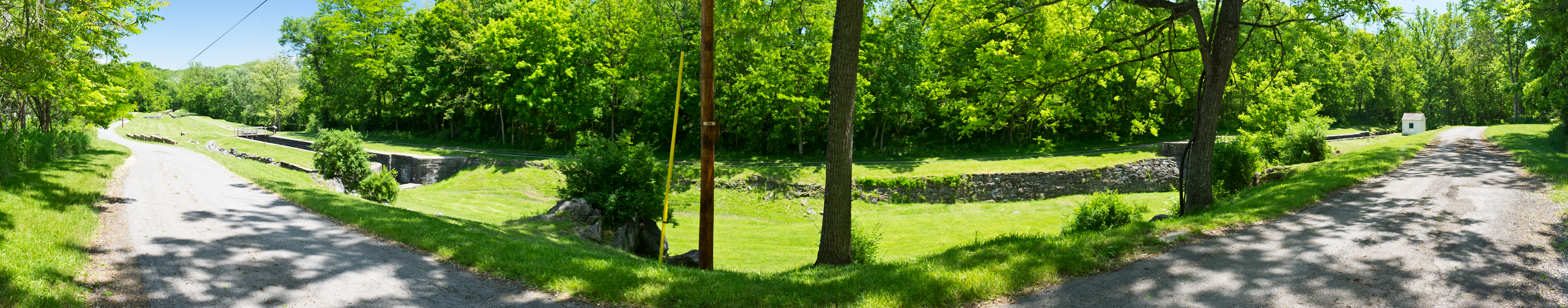
Panorama of the 4 locks area. Lock 50 is to the right.

== See also ==
- Chesapeake and Ohio Canal
