= John Bell Pottery =

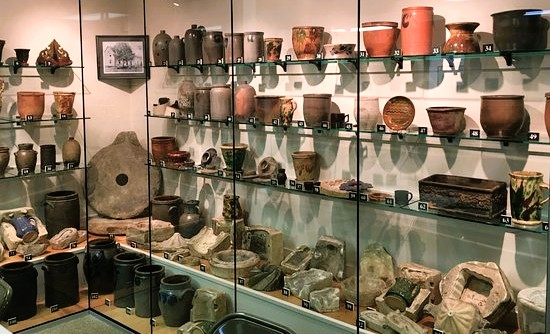
Bell Pottery Display at Renfrew Museum, Waynesboro, Pa.

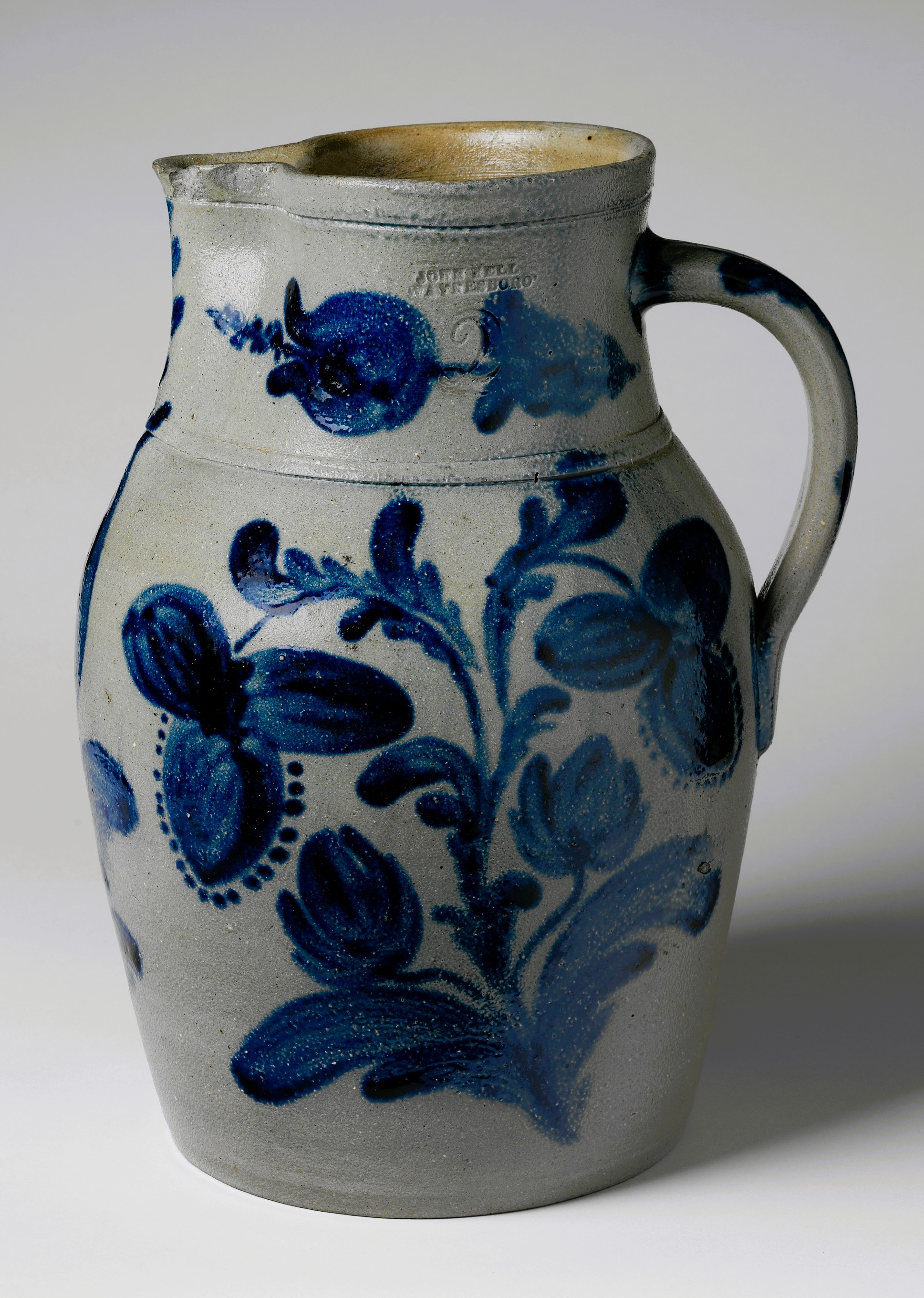
John Bell Pottery - pitcher, Metropolitan Museum of Art

The John Bell Pottery was a 19th-century American pottery manufactory based in Waynesboro, Pennsylvania. Established by potter John B. Bell Sr. in the early 1830s, the pottery became one of the most significant producers of folk ceramics in the Cumberland and Shenandoah Valley regions. Known for its utilitarian stoneware, redware, and later decorative ceramics, the Bell pottery operated in Waynesboro from approximately 1833 until 1898. Its work is regarded as an important contribution to American folk art and 19th-century ceramic production.

== History ==
=== Origins ===
The Bell family pottery tradition originated with Peter Bell Jr. (1775–1847), a potter of Scottish descent who worked in Hagerstown, Maryland, before relocating in 1825 to Winchester, Virginia. Several of his sons apprenticed in his workshops, learning ceramic techniques influenced by 18th-century German pottery traditions.

Among Peter Bell Jr.'s sons were John B. Bell Sr. (1800–1880), Samuel Leonard Bell (1811–1891), and Solomon Bell (1817–1882), all of whom became professional potters and established what became one of the most influential pottery families in the mid-Atlantic region.

In 1828, John B. Bell Sr. moved to Chambersburg, Pennsylvania, where he briefly worked with potter Jacob Heart Sr., before settling permanently in Waynesboro. During this period, Bell is believed to have adopted English ceramic molding techniques that later influenced the Bell pottery's production.

While John Bell operated the Waynesboro pottery, his brothers Samuel and Solomon established a pottery works in Strasburg, Virginia, extending the family's influence throughout the Shenandoah Valley.

=== Establishment in Waynesboro ===
By 1833, John B. Bell Sr. had established his pottery works at the corner of Main and Potomac Streets in Waynesboro. The workshop initially produced functional household wares, including crocks, jugs, pitchers, bowls, milk pans, and storage vessels. These wares were produced using local clay and often decorated with cobalt-blue sponge or brushwork motifs.

From 1839 until 1842, Solomon Bell worked at the Waynesboro pottery before returning to Virginia. As the business expanded, several of John Bell's sons joined the operation, transforming it into a multigenerational family enterprise.

Bell pottery was commonly marked with impressed stamps such as "J. BELL" or "JOHN BELL / WAYNESBORO", identifying the workshop and serving as marks of origin.

=== Family involvement ===
John B. Bell Sr. and his wife, Mary Elizabeth Fry Bell, had nine children. Five of their sons worked in the pottery business:

- John William Bell
- Upton Martin Bell
- Edward Fry Bell
- Charles Frederick Bell
- Victor Conrad Bell

John William Bell managed the pottery from 1879 to 1893, after which Upton Martin Bell managed the business until its closure in 1898.

Family tradition also holds that Bell's daughters, Mary Elizabeth Bell (Newman), Henrietta Virginia Bell, and Matilda Catharine Bell, assisted with glazing and decorative work.

=== Production and artistic development ===
The Waynesboro pottery produced a wide range of ceramic forms, including:

- Utilitarian redware and stoneware
- Tin-glazed (or faience) earthenware
- Slip-decorated bowls and jars
- Molded animal figures
- Presentation and commemorative pieces

By the middle of the 19th century, the pottery expanded beyond utilitarian wares into decorative and figural ceramics. Among its best-known products were molded lions, dogs, birds, deer, and ornamental flowerpots, often finished with blue or brown glazes.

Bell's ceramic lion figures are among the workshop's most recognized works and are held in major museum collections, including the Metropolitan Museum of Art.

=== Decline ===
Following the American Civil War, the expansion of industrial ceramic manufacturing reduced demand for handmade regional pottery. Although the Bell family increasingly produced decorative wares to adapt to changing consumer tastes, competition from factory-made goods gradually weakened the business.

The pottery ceased operations in 1898 under the management of Upton Martin Bell.

== Legacy ==
Bell pottery is highly valued by collectors, museums, and scholars of American folk art. Significant collections of Bell ceramics are preserved at the Royer–Nicodemus House and Farm (Renfrew Museum and Park) in Waynesboro, Pennsylvania.

Today, the Bell family pottery is recognized as one of Pennsylvania's most important 18th-century ceramic traditions and remains an important part of Waynesboro's artistic and industrial heritage.

== See also ==
- American stoneware
