= Bloom Brothers Department Stores =

Bloom Brothers Department Stores were located at sites in Franklin County, Pennsylvania, and Baltimore, Maryland, from the company's founding in 1897 as The Old Reliable Dry Goods Store until the closing of the Chambersburg, Pennsylvania, store in 1944.

== History ==
The Old Reliable Dry Goods Store, Conn and Bloom, Proprietors, opened on April 24, 1897, at 84 South Main Street in downtown Chambersburg, Pennsylvania. Simon Conn (1860–1932) and Benjamin Bloom (1861–1904), an uncle and his nephew, respectively, whose immediate ancestors had emigrated from western Lithuania to Louisiana and Kansas in the 1840s, opened the store after peddling goods from farm to farm in south-central Pennsylvania and northern Maryland since the mid-1880s. A second store in Waynesboro, Pennsylvania, called "Bloom and Conn", succeeded the first (1898–99) but did not flourish; a third, also known as Bloom and Conn, which doubled as a grocery store for its remote Path Valley community, thrived in Dry Run, Pennsylvania, northwest of Chambersburg, at the same time as the Waynesboro store, and the fourth Bloom and Conn began and ended its existence in April 1899 in the Fulton County hamlet of Burnt Cabins, Pennsylvania, for lack of space. The fifth and sixth Bloom stores opened in East Baltimore between 1900 and 1905, offering finer men's clothing and furnishings, respectively, but they closed after less than a year.

In February 1900, with the extended Bloom and Conn families now settled in south-central Pennsylvania and northern Maryland, the partnership between the Conns and Blooms was dissolved and each family started its own company. The Bloom family's oldest child, Jacob Bloom (1869–1898), fell victim to tuberculosis during the company's "Conn and Bloom" phase, leaving Jacob's older brothers Ben and Isaac H. Bloom (1872–1955) to open the first Bloom Brothers store at 84 South Main in Chambersburg on March 10, 1900. Eli F. Bloom (1876–1941), treasurer of the firm, managed the company's finances from an office overlooking the main selling floor in Chambersburg, while Harry M. Bloom (1880–1969) became company sales manager after learning the business as a clerk under Isaac at the Waynesboro location. Bloom Brothers opened its second store on March 21, 1901, in the former Old City Hall on Waynesboro's Town Square. The Dry Run location reverted to Conn family ownership in 1900 upon dissolution of "Conn and Bloom/Bloom and Conn".

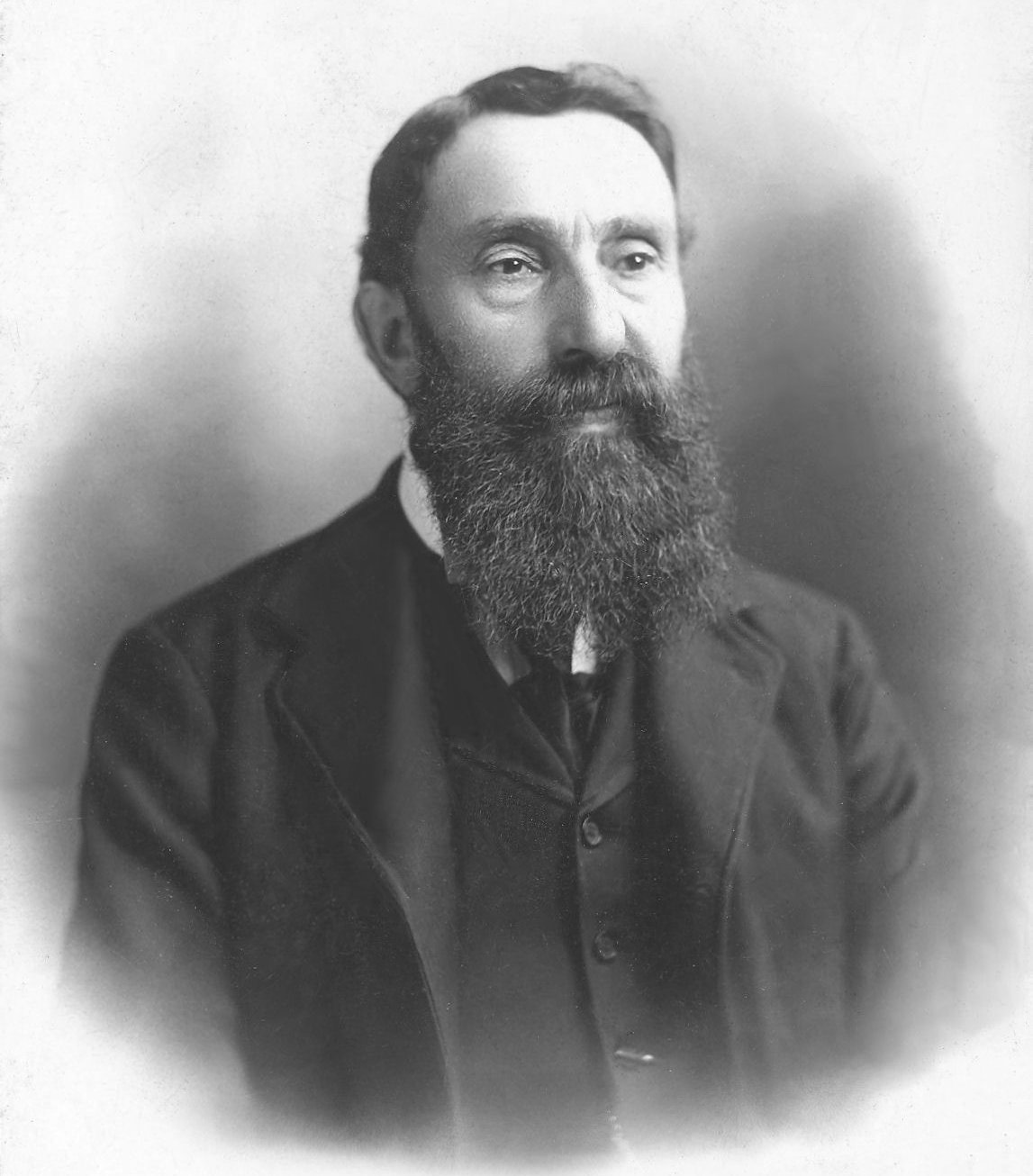
Morris Bloom (1838-1925), learned father of the Bloom brothers and proprietor of the short-lived Baltimore specialty stores (Bloom family)

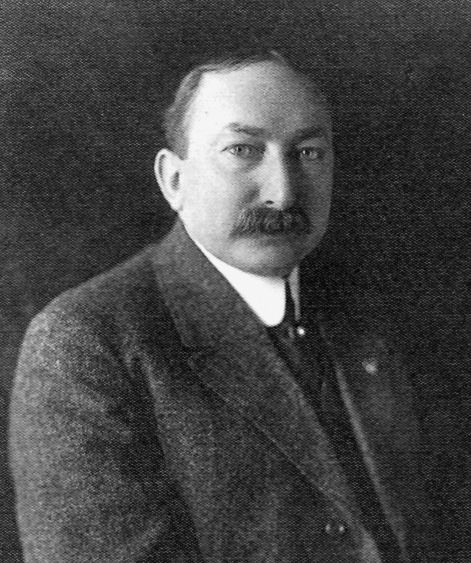
Isaac H. Bloom (1874-1955), president and principal buyer (Bloom family)

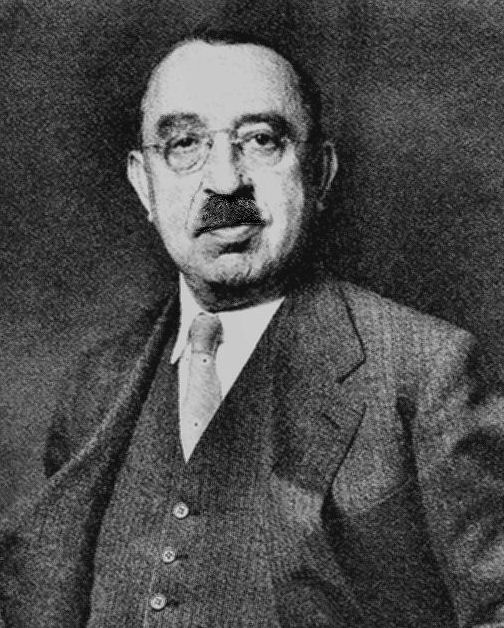
Eli F. Bloom (1876-1941), treasurer and comptroller (Bloom family)

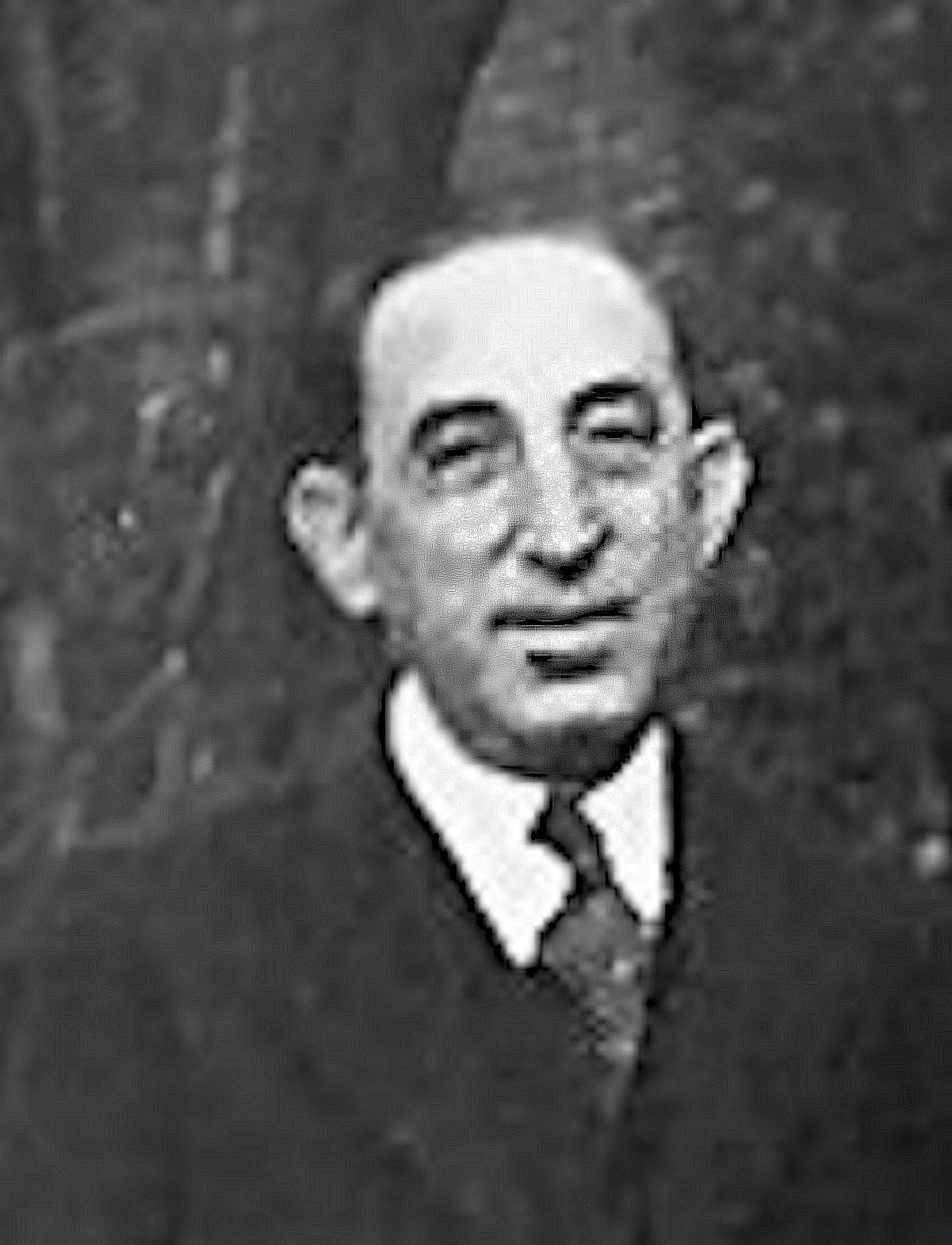
Harry M. Bloom (1880-1969), vice-president and sales manager (Bloom family)

Benjamin Bloom died of tuberculosis in March 1904 at the age of 32, but Bloom Brothers thrived under Isaac as president and principal buyer, earning a dedicated customer base by offering "15% to 25% lower prices than other stores" advertised in the Chambersburg Valley Spirit and the Waynesboro Herald. Having grown too large for its inaugural space, the Chambersburg store moved in April 1903 to its second location at 83 South Main Street on the northwest corner of Main and Queen, where the company began a tradition of offering seven departments of wares to the public: dry goods, men's furnishings (including shoes), millinery, clothing, china, household furnishings, and carpets.

Fire consumes former Bloom Brothers Waynesboro #2 buildings (Zenith and Sherman's), 23-25 West Main Street, June 28, 1973. The Bloom Building stands between Sherman's and columned First National Bank (Waynesboro Record Herald)

Thanks to the company's aggressive discounting, the frugal farmers and merchants of the surrounding Pennsylvania and Maryland countryside, many of them Amish and Mennonite, crowded Bloom Brothers' aisles every Saturday, and the Waynesboro store, having outgrown the first floor of the Old Town Hall, moved to a double-storefront at 23-25 West Main Street in March 1903 (see pictures), where it would remain for the duration of its existence.

In 1905, the brothers’ newly widowed father, Morris Bloom (1838-1925), opened men's clothing and furnishings stores at 32 and 100 Exeter Street, respectively, in East Baltimore, but the elder Bloom left the country in October, 1906, to aid a brother that had contracted tuberculosis while dairy farming in Boksburg, South Africa. When Bloom returned, the Baltimore stores did not reopen; instead, the elder Bloom, educated in German preparatory schools but forbidden by authorities to enroll at a university, seeing that the Pennsylvania stores were in good hands, fulfilled a lifelong dream by visiting Harvard University in Cambridge, Massachusetts, while staying with his younger sister and her family in Boston (1909–12).

The Chambersburg store was the largest of its kind in the Borough of Chambersburg, and both surviving Bloom stores were the first in Franklin County to employ an overhead cash system. Later in their history, the stores pared household furniture, carpeting, and china from their inventory, and by the 1930s they sold mainly clothing.

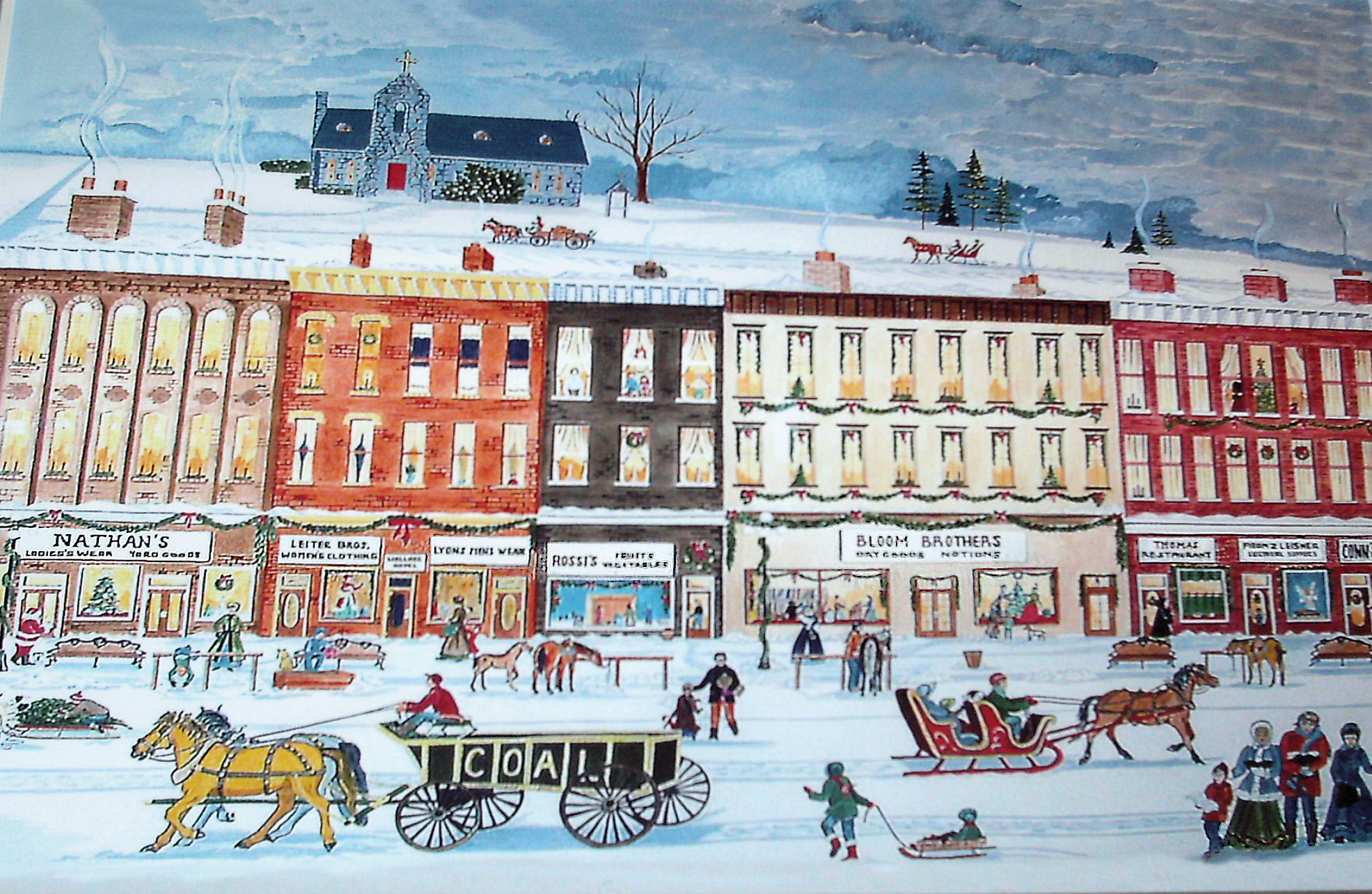
Chambersburg Heritage Center Children's Room painting of Main Street in 1913 includes Bloom Brothers Chambersburg #3, 1913-39 (Chambersburg Heritage Center)

While the Waynesboro store remained at 23-25 West Main, its second location, from March 1903 until it closed in 1933 during the Great Depression, the Chambersburg store had four locations. Begun at 84 South Main as "The Old Reliable Conn and Bloom", it moved in 1903 across the street to the northeast corner of Queen and South Main (1903-1913). The store assumed its third location in the spring of 1913 on the three floors of the Reisher Building in the middle of the first block of South Main Street. Then in 1939, the store moved to its final location in the Keefer Building on the southeast corner of Queen and South Main, occupying three even larger floors. But with World War II claiming virtually all consumer goods and the family's youngest generation serving in the armed forces overseas, the Chambersburg store was forced to close its doors on March 1, 1944, to front-page headlines in the Chambersburg Public Opinion and the surprise of the entire extended community.

The Bloom Building, an office building at 17 West Main in Waynesboro carved out of the National Hotel/Hotel Werner when the First National Bank of Waynesboro (now a part of M&T Bank) built its granite headquarters, survived intact until the bank repurchased it in December 1972 for its annex. On June 28, 1973, a fire consumed the former Bloom Brothers store, occupied since 1933 by Sherman's Shoe Store, hastening the building's demolition by the bank.

Isaac H. Bloom, childless and gifted with seemingly boundless energy, divided his time from 1912 until 1926 between the stores and a newly founded national bank. He served as both chief buyer for the Bloom department stores and as second vice-president and senior lending officer of the Waynesboro Trust Company, catty-corner to the store on Town Square. He also acquired a Maryland real estate salesman's license and investment banker's credentials. When Waynesboro Trust merged with the First National in 1926, Bloom left the bank and moved permanently to Baltimore, where his wife Hannah Jaffe Bloom (1885-1956) had lived alone except on weekends since 1905. Still buying for Bloom Brothers, Isaac now founded the Bloom Building and Loan Association, a commercial lending institution located during its first four years (1925–29) on the sixth floor of downtown Baltimore's fashionable Equitable Life Building, which still stands today. In 1929, the bank moved permanently to a storefront on downtown's North Avenue Baltimore and remained there until Isaac Bloom's death in June 1955, meeting once a week on Thursday evenings to review loan applications. Coincidentally, the area remains a hub of storefront lending companies to this day.

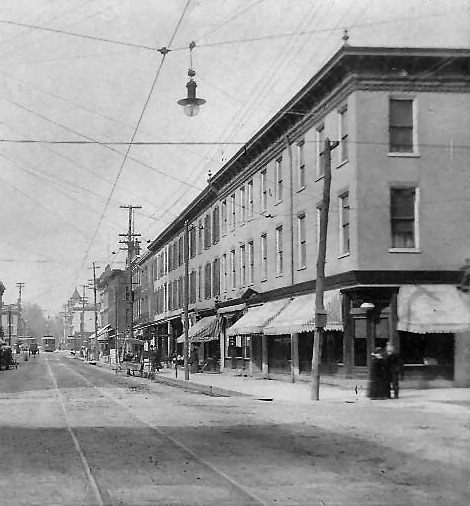
Bloom Brothers Chambersburg #1, 84 South Main Street (first store from right), 1897-1900 and 1900-1903, respectively (Postcard image)

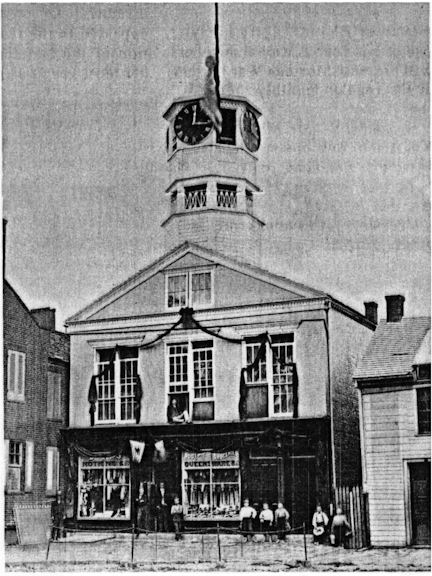
Bloom Brothers Waynesboro #1, Waynesboro Old Town Hall, Town Square, 1901-03 (Waynesboro Record Herald)

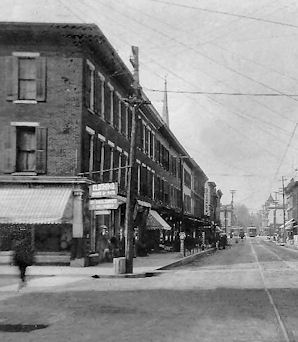
Bloom Brothers Chambersburg #2 (looking north), 83 South Main Street, 1903-13 (Postcard image)

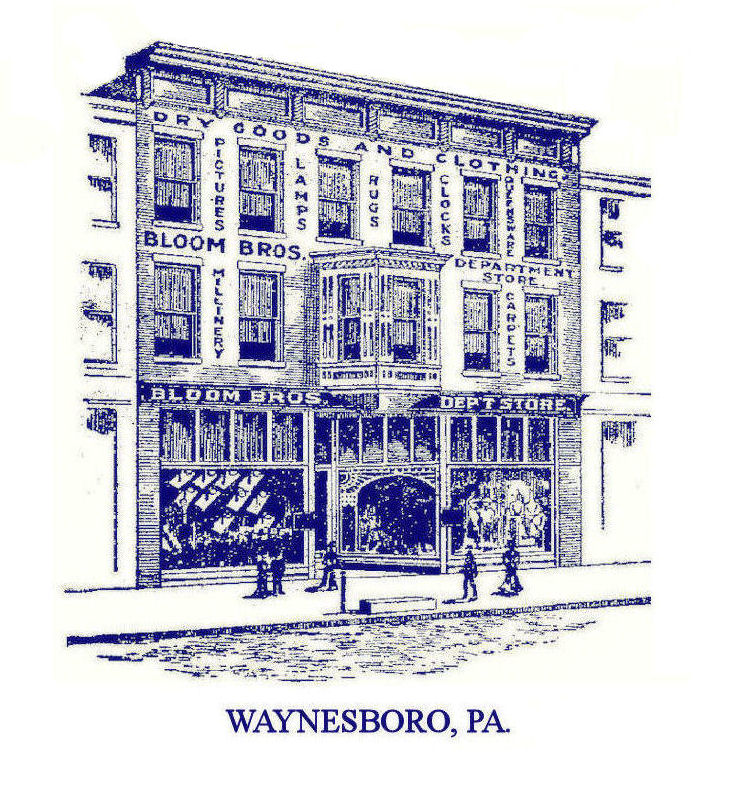
Bloom Brothers Waynesboro #2, 23-25 West Main Street, 1903-31 (Bloom family)

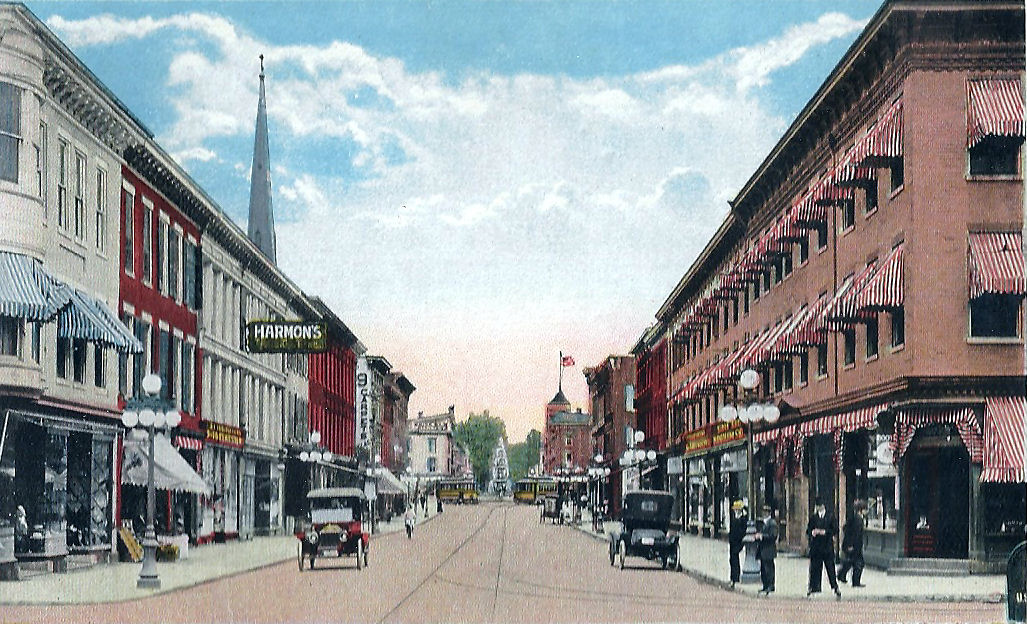
Bloom Brothers Chambersburg #3, 74-76 South Main Street, 1913–39, second store from right (Postcard image)

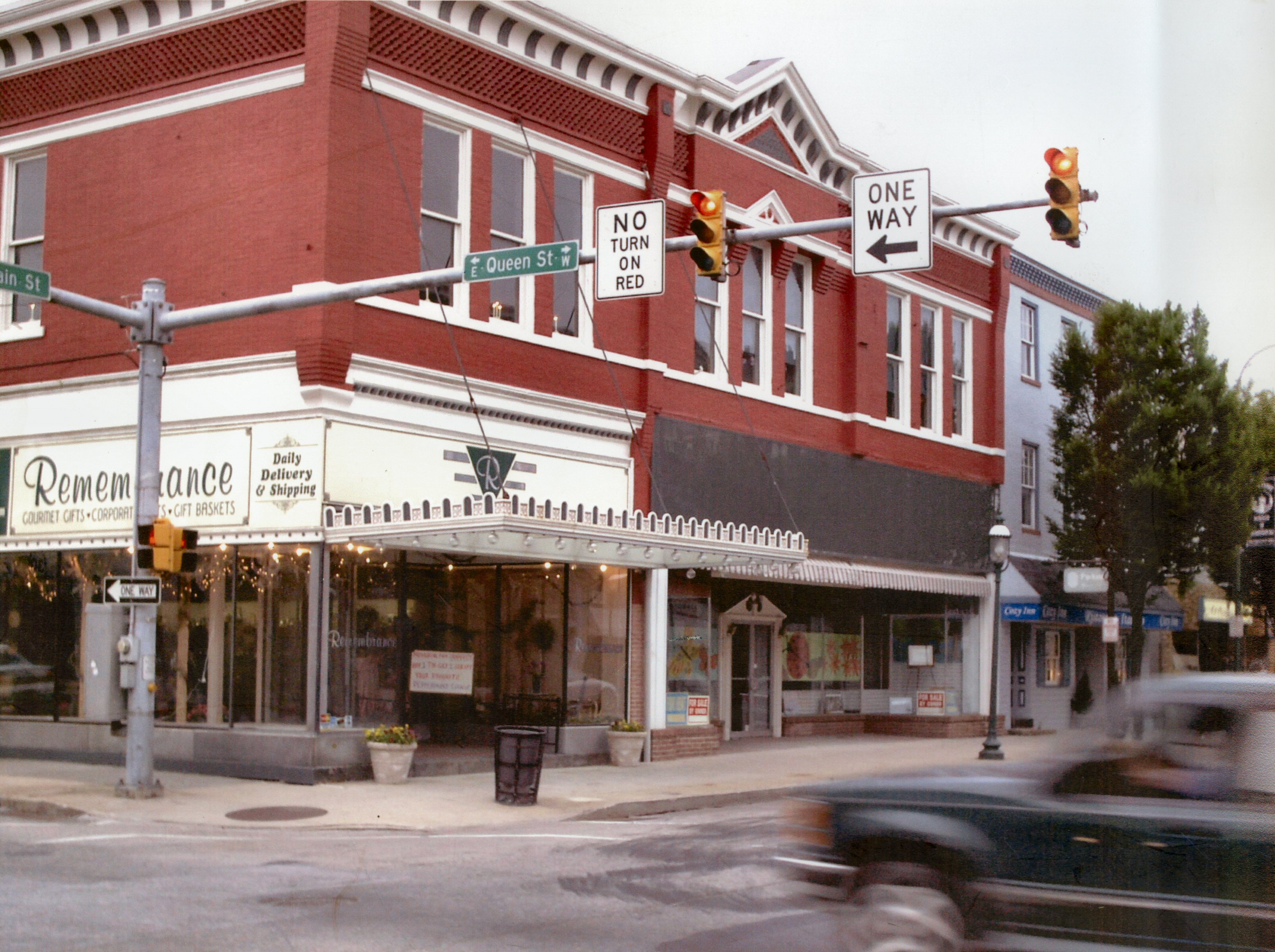
Bloom Brothers Chambersburg #4, 104-108 South Main Street, 1939-44 (Bloom family)
