= Royer–Nicodemus House and Farm =

Historic house in Pennsylvania, United States

- U.S. National Register of Historic Places
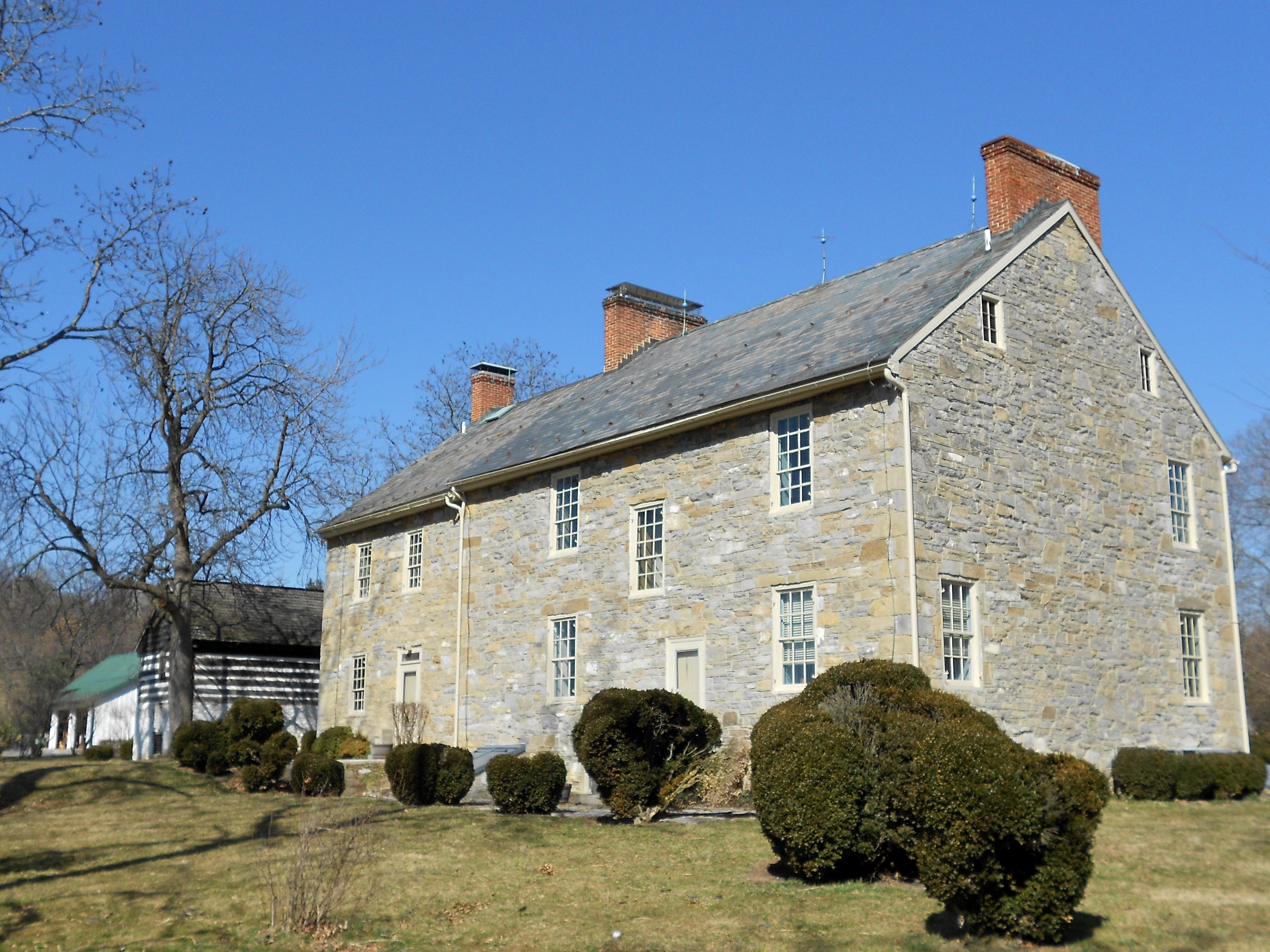

- Location within Pennsylvania Location within the United States
- Location: 1010 E. Main St., Waynesboro, Pennsylvania
- Coordinates: 39°44′35″N 77°33′44″W
- Area: 99.6 acres (40.3 ha)
- Built: c. 1812
- Built by: Daniel Royer
- Architectural style: Federal, Germanic vernacular
- NRHP reference No.: 76001641
- Added to NRHP: August 28, 1976

The Royer–Nicodemus House and Farm, also known as the Renfrew Museum and Park, is an historic home and farm that is located in Waynesboro in Franklin County, Pennsylvania, United States.

It was listed on the National Register of Historic Places in 1976.

== History and architectural features ==
The main house, which was built circa 1812, is a two-and-one-half-story, four-bay, stone dwelling, with a two-bay addition that was built circa 1815. It was restored between 1974 and 1975. The property also includes the brick Fahnestock farmstead (1812), a small stone butcher/smoke house, a stone and log milkhouse, and a large frame barn with distinctive cupolas that was built in 1896.

The property was deeded to the Borough of Waynesboro in 1973, and has operated as the Renfrew Museum and Park since 1975.

== Gallery ==
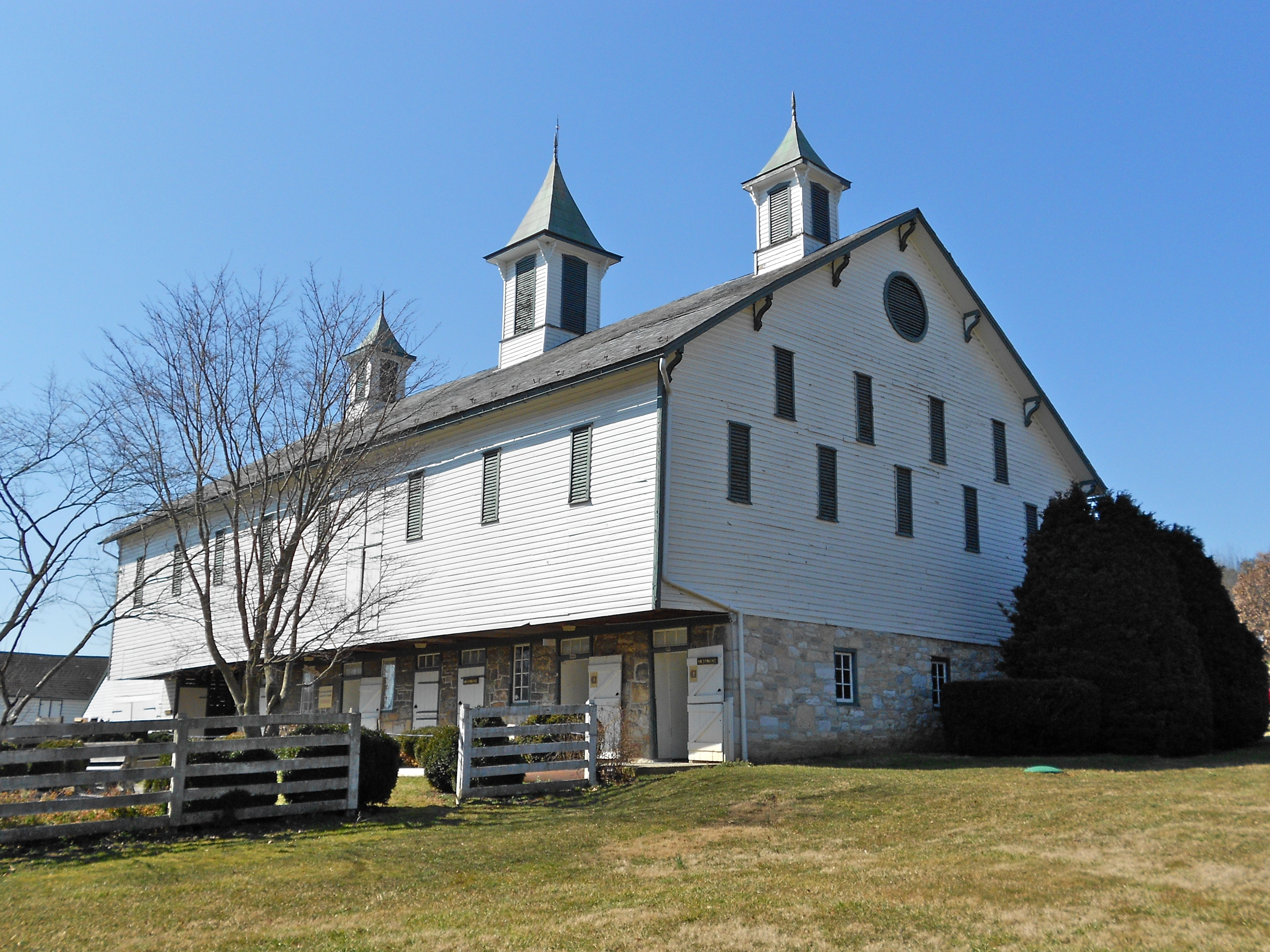
Barn

== See also ==
- John Bell Pottery
