= Borough Hall of the Borough of Waynesboro =

- U.S. National Register of Historic Places
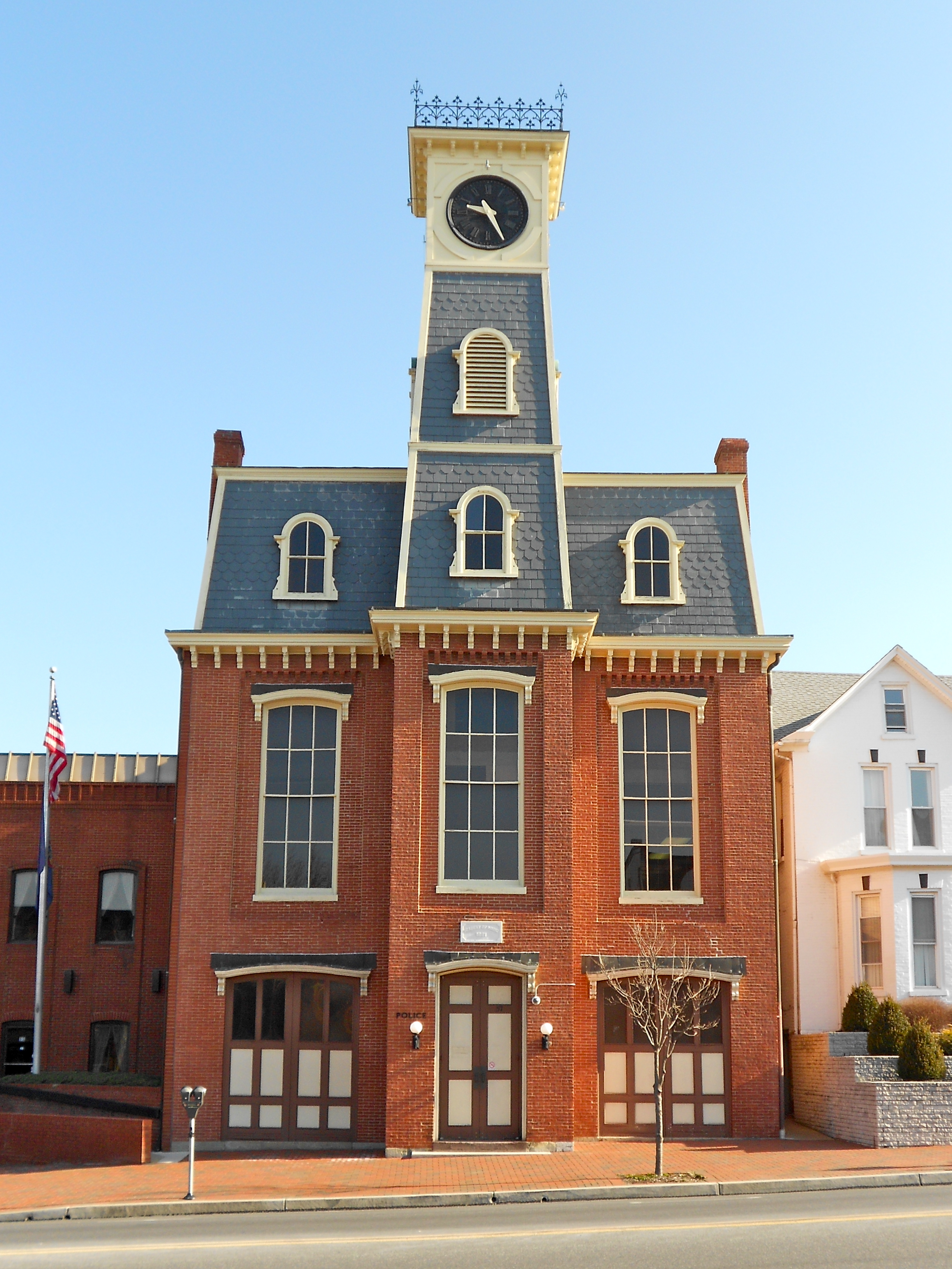
- Borough Hall of the Borough of Waynesboro, February 2012

- Location within Pennsylvania Location within the United States
- Location: 57 E. Main St., Waynesboro, Pennsylvania
- Coordinates: 39°45′18″N 77°34′36″W
- Area: 0.6 acres (0.24 ha)
- Built: 1881
- Architectural style: Second Empire architecture
- NRHP reference No.: 80003496
- Added to NRHP: December 2, 1980

Borough Hall of the Borough of Waynesboro is a historic borough hall in Waynesboro in Franklin County, Pennsylvania. It was built in 1881 by the town council as a public theater and fire station and named the Academy of Music. The first lecture at the theater, "The Rise and Fall of the Moustache", was given by Robert Burdette, one of over 3,000 times he gave the lecture throughout the country. The theater hosted the first motion picture shown in Waynesboro in 1906.

The three-story, square brick building in an Italianate style, modified by Second Empire-style motifs. The building features a mansard roof with straight sides, a central pavilion extending approximately two stories above the roofline, cast-iron roof cresting, and eyebrow-like window heads.

When built, the building housed a number of functions including theater, public market, and library. It has housed solely borough offices since 1976.

It was listed on the National Register of Historic Places in 1980.
