= Edgewater Borough Hall =

- U.S. National Register of Historic Places
- New Jersey Register of Historic Places
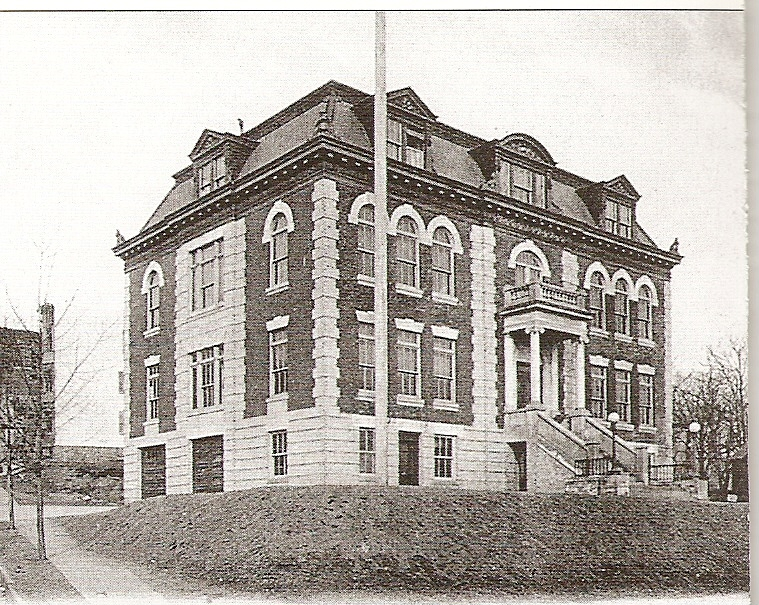

- Location within Bergen County, New Jersey Location within New Jersey Location within the United States
- Location: 916 River Road, Edgewater, New Jersey
- Coordinates: 40°49′38″N 73°58′26″W
- Area: less than one acre
- Built: 1904
- Architectural style: Late 19th And 20th Century Revivals
- NRHP reference No.: 07001401
- NJRHP No.: 4258

Significant dates
- Added to NRHP: January 16, 2008
- Designated NJRHP: September 20, 2007

Edgewater Borough Hall is located in Edgewater, Bergen County, New Jersey, United States. The building was added to the National Register of Historic Places on January 16, 2008. The building was constructed in 1904.

== See also ==
- National Register of Historic Places listings in Bergen County, New Jersey

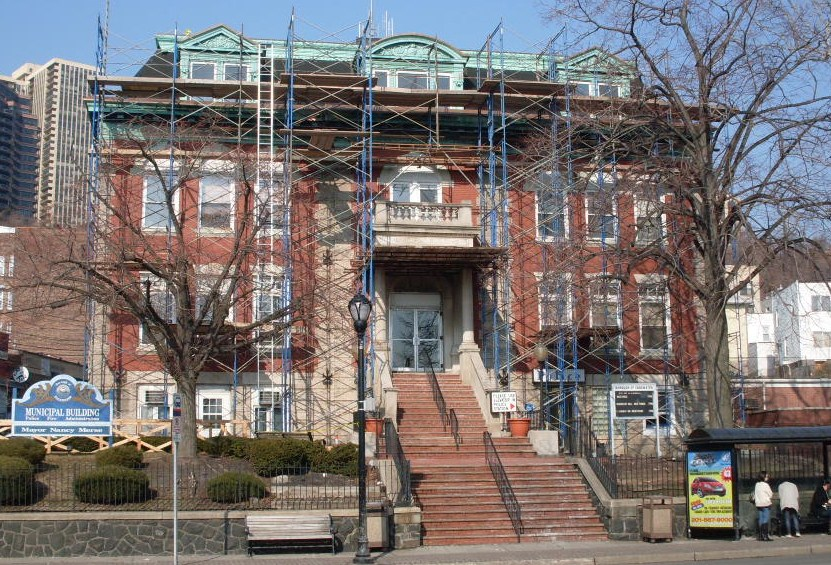
Borough Hall with scaffolding for renovation, 2009

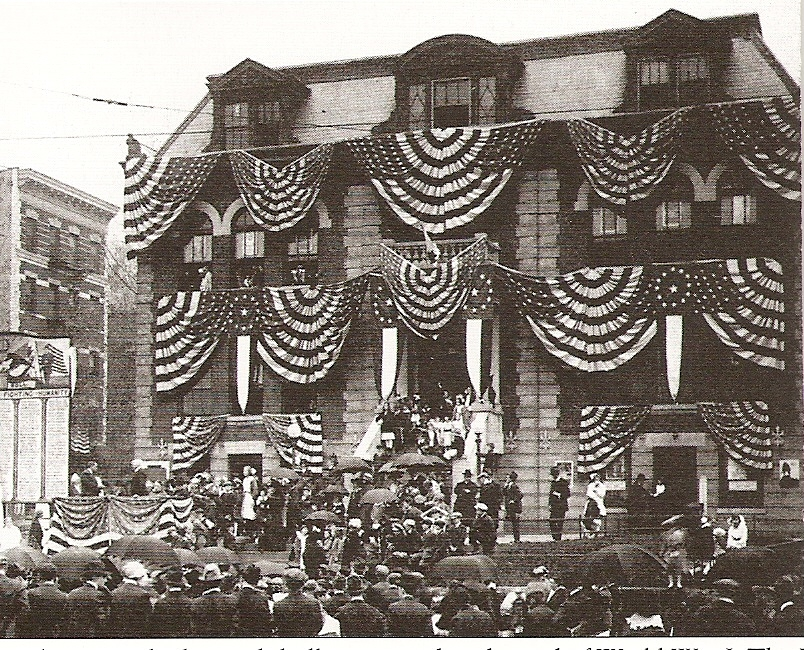
Boro Hall celebration at end of WW I
