= Lewis P. Firey =

American politician

- Born: April 11, 1825; Clear Spring, Maryland
- Died: March 5, 1885; Roanoke, Virginia

Lewis P. Firey (11 April 1825 – 5 March 1885) was a Southern Unionist who served in the Maryland State Convention, and the Maryland State Senate during the American Civil War. He was the originator of the project for the Antietam National Cemetery.

== Early life ==
Firey was born and raised in Clear Spring, Maryland, a son of Henry and Martha Miller Firey. After attending the district school, by the age of 21, he taught at a school for a year, and then entered Pennsylvania College, at Gettysburg, Pennsylvania. He had only been there for two years because of his health problems, he returned to Clear Spring where he began working on his father's farm.

== Politics ==
In 1850, without his knowledge, Firey was nominated as a candidate to Maryland's Constitutional Convention of 1850–1851. Though he initially declined the nomination, prominent locals encouraged him to change his mind, and he was subsequently elected. He was present at the Constitutional Convention of 1850–1851, when it convened in Annapolis, on November 4, 1850.

Despite being the youngest member of the convention, Firey took part in all proceedings, and was recognized as one of the most able debaters. He also drafted a bill regarding the subject of representation in the State Legislature, in which he provided that African-Americans in the State be counted the same as they were for Representatives in Congress (each to count as three-fifths), but the bill was defeated on the final vote. Former Governor William Grason, however, took the same bill, and after amending it to measure representation equally, after 1860, was successful in getting it passed after a vigorous between representatives from the opposing ends of the state. The Convention adjourned on May 13, 1851, and a second state constitution, adopted by the convention, was ratified by the voters on June 14, 1851.

Though he returned once more to farming, Firey was again elected to the State Convention in 1855, and for the special sessions, in April, June, and July, 1861.

== The 1860 Presidential Election and the American Civil War ==
A member of the Constitutional Union Party, Firey was a strong supporter of John Bell in his bid for the U.S. presidency. After the election of Republican Abraham Lincoln, Firey remained true to the Union, and regularly spoke at Unionist meetings - such as the one held on January 31, 1861, at Four Locks - speaking strongly against secession within his district.

When the 1st Potomac Home Brigade Infantry formed, in late summer 1861, Firey was initially selected as major and enrolling officer, but declined further service once he was tapped for a spot in the wartime Maryland legislature.

That winter, during the December Special Session of the Maryland Senate, Firey maintained his position as a Unionist, but sought a compromise that might bring a more rapid end to the war. He is most remembered, from this time, for his February 5, 1862 speech on the compromise resolutions that he proposed.

It was also during this time that Firey became a Republican.

Firey continued as a member of the Maryland Senate for the next two years.

== Antietam National Cemetery ==
In the wake of the Battle of Antietam, it became apparent to Firey that an appropriate cemetery be designated for the battle's dead. In 1864, he introduced, to the Maryland Senate, a plan to establish such a cemetery. The state senate subsequently appointed a joint committee, consisting of three members on the part of the Senate and an equal number on the part of the House, "to inquire into the propriety of purchasing, on behalf of the State, a portion of the battle-field of Antietam, not exceeding twenty acres, for the purposes of a State and National Cemetery, in which the bodies of our heroes who fell in that great struggle and are now bleaching in the upturned furrows, may be gathered for a decent burial, and their memories embalmed in some suitable memorial." Within a few days of appointing the committee and visiting the battlefield, an eligible spot was selected on the battlefield, and, on March 23, 1865, the state established a burial site by purchasing 11¼ acres for $1,161.75. Though interments began in 1866, Antietam National Cemetery was dedicated by President Andrew Johnson on September 17, 1867.

== Postwar ==
Following the completion of his last term in the Maryland Senate, Firey purchased a farm in Anne Arundel County, near Annapolis, but within a few years, owing to poor health, left the farm for Kansas. There, he took an active part with the Evangelical Lutheran Synod of Kansas. He took a particular interest in building a Lutheran church at Topeka, Kansas, and contributed liberally to its erection and support. Having been in poor health for a prolonged period, on March 5, 1885, Lewis P. Firey died at the residence of his brother, Rev. Samuel Firey, in Roanoke, Virginia. He was returned to Clear Spring, and was buried in the family plot in the cemetery of St. Paul's Lutheran Church.
