= Waynesboro, Pennsylvania =

Borough in Pennsylvania, US

- Borough
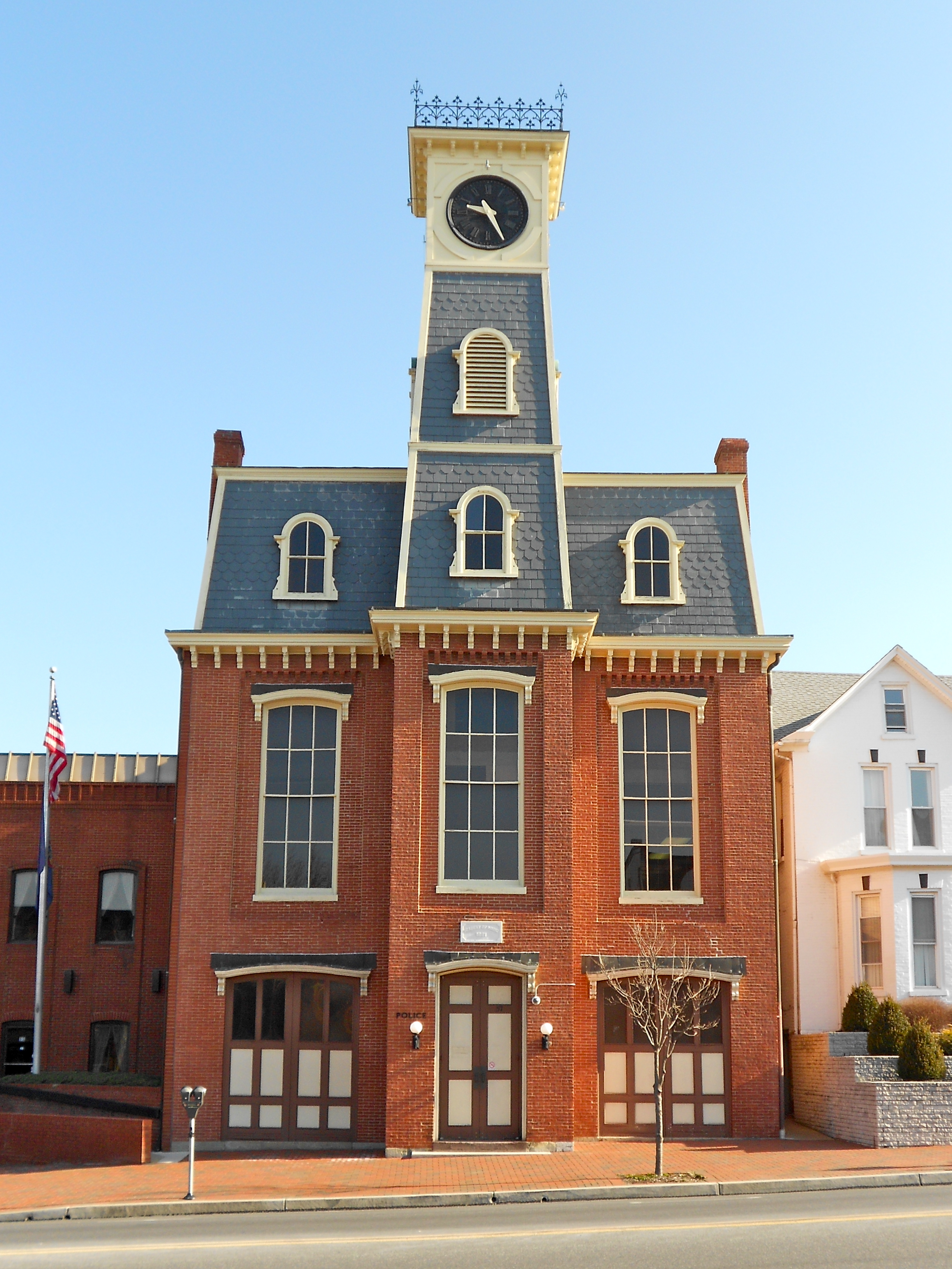
- Waynesboro Borough Hall

- Seal

- Location of Waynesboro in Franklin County, Pennsylvania

- Location within Pennsylvania
- Coordinates: 39°44′56″N 77°34′53″W
- Country: United States
- State: Pennsylvania
- County: Franklin
- Settled: 1749

Government
  - Type: Borough Council
  - Mayor: Dade Royer

Area
  - Total: 3.41 sq mi (8.84 km^{2})
  - Land: 3.41 sq mi (8.84 km^{2})
  - Water: 0 sq mi (0.00 km^{2})
- Elevation: 719 ft (219 m)

Population (2020)
  - Total: 10,951
  - Density: 3,190.7/sq mi (1,231.92/km^{2})
- Time zone: UTC−5 (Eastern (EST))
  - Summer (DST): UTC−4 (EDT)
- ZIP code: 17268
- Area codes: 717, 223
- FIPS code: 42-81824
- GNIS feature ID: 1215248
- Website: Waynesboro

Waynesboro (/ˈweɪnzbʌroʊ/) is a borough in Franklin County, Pennsylvania, United States. Located on the southern border of the state, Waynesboro is in the Cumberland Valley between Hagerstown, Maryland, and Chambersburg, Pennsylvania. It is part of Chambersburg, PA Metropolitan Statistical Area, which is part of the Washington–Baltimore combined statistical area. It is two miles north of the Mason–Dixon line and close to Camp David and the Raven Rock Mountain Complex.

The population within the borough limits was 10,951 at the 2020 census. When combined with the surrounding Washington and Quincy Townships, the population of greater Waynesboro is 31,166. The Waynesboro Area School District serves a resident population of 33,182, according to 2020 federal census data.

== History ==
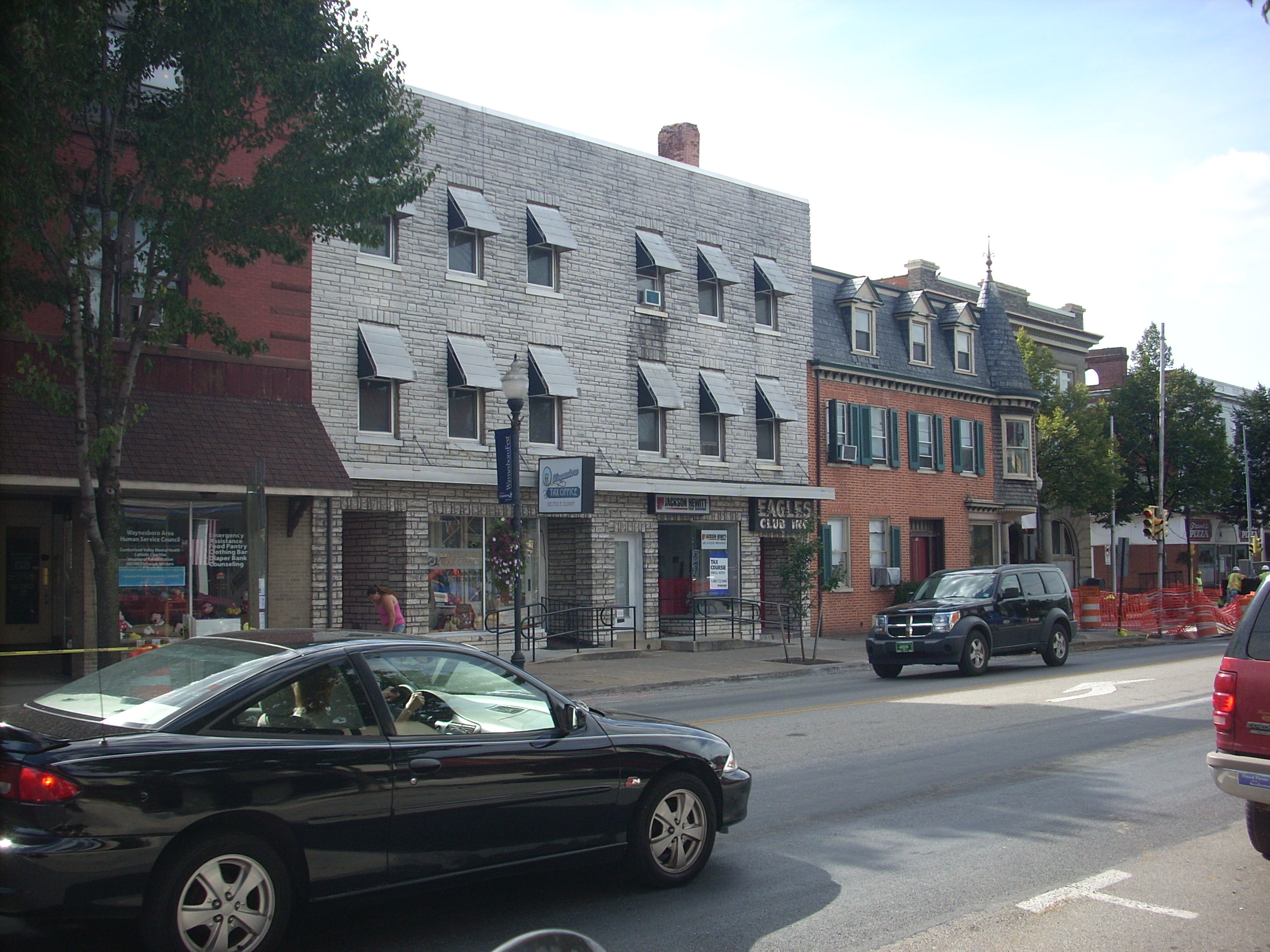
Downtown Waynesboro

The region around Antietam Creek had been home to Native Americans, primarily Susquehannock and Lenape, for thousands of years prior to settlement by Anglo-Europeans in the mid-18th century. Beginning in 1749 and again in 1751, a certain John Wallace obtained several warrants for the land on which the center of the town now stands. In 1797, John Wallace, a son of the original Scottish settler, laid out the town of Waynesburg in Franklin County, Pennsylvania. The place originally incorporated as Waynesburg borough on December 21, 1818, however that charter was repealed March 30, 1825. When reincorporated on January 30, 1831, the borough was given the name "Waynesboro". It is one of several dozen towns, cities, and counties named after General Anthony Wayne, a hero of the American Revolution.

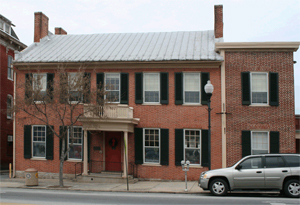
Alexander Hamilton Memorial Free Library

During the Civil War, Waynesboro played a part in the Gettysburg campaign in June and July 1863. In the week before the Battle of Gettysburg, Confederate Major General Jubal Early's division of Lieutenant General Richard S. Ewell's corps of the Army of Northern Virginia passed through the community on its way northward. After the battle, General Robert E. Lee rode through the border community with his retreating forces.

Numerous stone grain mills are in the area: Welty's Mill, Shank's Mill, Hopewell Roller Mill and others. Most of them still standing and in use.

By the early years of the 20th century, Waynesboro had become an industrial town. It was known for the manufacture of engines, boilers, grinders, threshers, boring machines, bolt cutters, wood and iron workers' vises, nut facers, etc. There were also foundries and machine shops and manufacturers of lumber products. Local companies included Frick Company, Geiser Manufacturing, Waynesboro Knitting Mill, Connie's Sportwear, Freeman's Shoes, Landis Machine Company, and Landis Tool Company. The population of the borough had its greatest increase between 1880 and 1920 when the borough grew fivefold from just under 1,900 to almost 10,000.

== Amenities ==
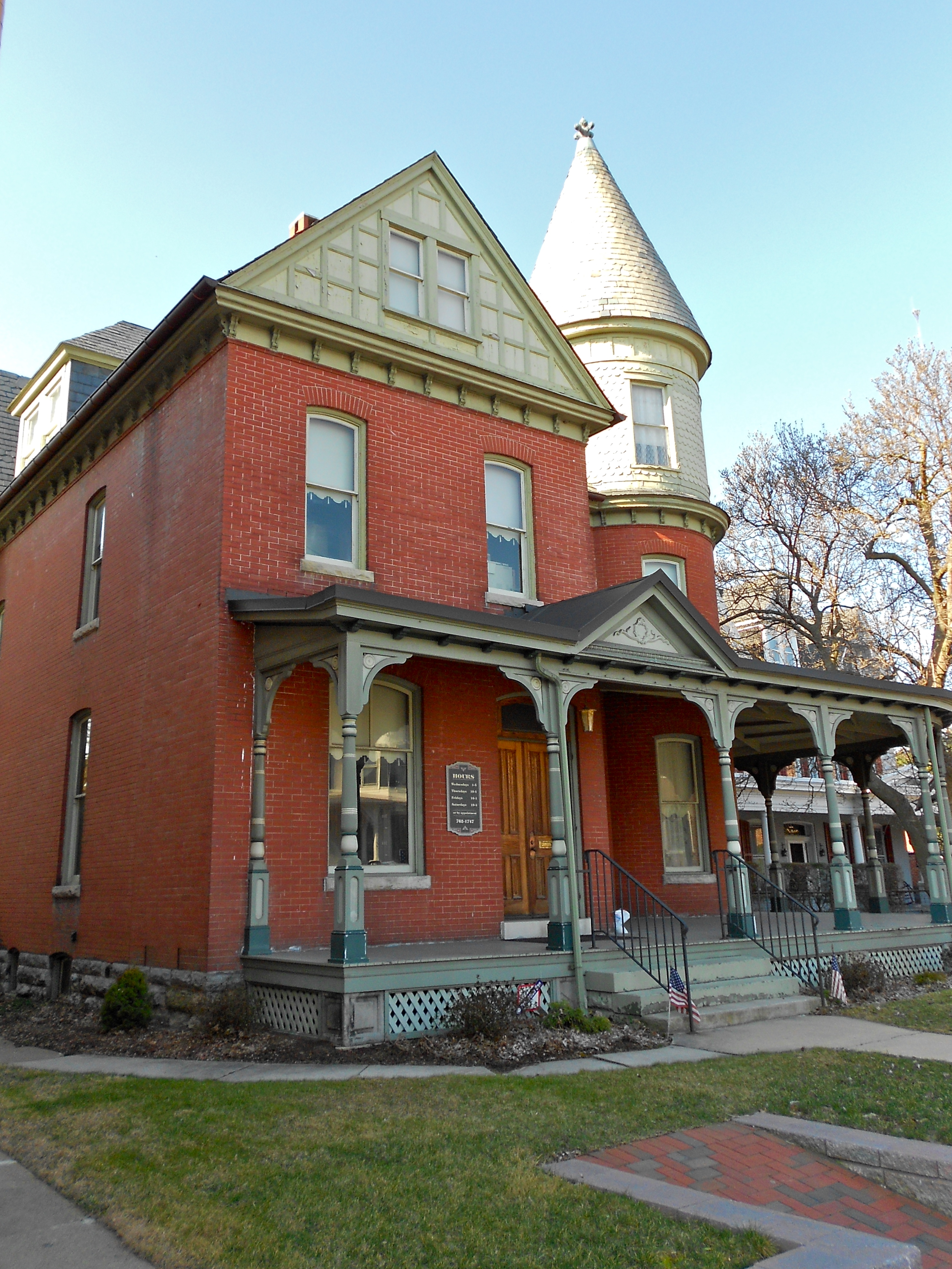
Joseph J. Oller House

Waynesboro is home to Royer–Nicodemus House and Farm (Renfrew Museum and Park), a historical museum depicting 18th-century farm life. It is named after two young sisters who reputedly died there in 1764 during a Native American attack. The museum houses the Bell Collection, which contains works from the John Bell Pottery.

The Alexander Hamilton House, Borough Hall of the Borough of Waynesboro, Joseph J. Oller House, Royer–Nicodemus House and Farm, and Welty's Mill Bridge are listed on the National Register of Historic Places.

Camp Penn is located across from Old Forge State Park, nestled in the southern edge of the Michaux State Forest.

== Geography ==
According to the U.S. Census Bureau, the borough has a total area of 3.4 square miles (8.8 km^{2}), all land.

== Demographics ==
Historical population
Census	Pop.	Note	%±
1840	799		—
1850	1,019		27.5%
1860	1,233		21.0%
1870	1,345		9.1%
1880	1,888		40.4%
1890	3,811		101.9%
1900	5,396		41.6%
1910	7,199		33.4%
1920	9,720		35.0%
1930	10,167		4.6%
1940	10,231		0.6%
1950	10,334		1.0%
1960	10,427		0.9%
1970	10,011		−4.0%
1980	9,726		−2.8%
1990	9,578		−1.5%
2000	9,614		0.4%
2010	10,568		9.9%
2020	10,951		3.6%

=== 2020 census ===
As of the 2020 census, Waynesboro had a population of 10,951. The median age was 38.5 years. 22.9% of residents were under the age of 18 and 17.9% of residents were 65 years of age or older. For every 100 females there were 90.6 males, and for every 100 females age 18 and over there were 88.9 males age 18 and over.

99.9% of residents lived in urban areas, while 0.1% lived in rural areas.

There were 4,766 households in Waynesboro, of which 28.0% had children under the age of 18 living in them. Of all households, 36.8% were married-couple households, 21.1% were households with a male householder and no spouse or partner present, and 32.3% were households with a female householder and no spouse or partner present. About 35.6% of all households were made up of individuals and 14.2% had someone living alone who was 65 years of age or older.

There were 5,243 housing units, of which 9.1% were vacant. The homeowner vacancy rate was 2.4% and the rental vacancy rate was 8.5%.

Racial composition as of the 2020 census
Race	Number	Percent
White	9,537	87.1%
Black or African American	394	3.6%
American Indian and Alaska Native	46	0.4%
Asian	50	0.5%
Native Hawaiian and Other Pacific Islander	1	0.0%
Some other race	267	2.4%
Two or more races	656	6.0%
Hispanic or Latino (of any race)	487	4.4%

=== 2010 census ===
As of the 2010 census, there were 10,568 people, 4,512 households, and 2,740 families residing in the borough. The population density was 3,108.2 inhabitants per square mile (1,200.1/km^{2}). There were 4,969 housing units at an average density of 1,461.4 per square mile (564.2/km^{2}). The racial makeup of the borough was 90.6% White, 2.9% African American, 0.3% Native American, 0.6% Asian, 0.0% Pacific Islander, 0.1% from other races, and 1.9% from two or more races. Hispanic or Latino of any race were 3.7% of the population.

There were 4,512 households, out of which 27.4% had children under the age of 18 living with them, 40.7% were married couples living together, 14.1% had a female householder with no husband present, and 39.3% were non-families. 32.7% of all households were made up of individuals, and 12.7% had someone living alone who was 65 years of age or older. The average household size was 2.33 and the average family size was 2.91.

In the borough, the population was spread out, with 23.4% under the age of 18, 9.8% from 18 to 24, 27.7% from 25 to 44, 24.2% from 45 to 64, and 15.1% who were 65 years of age or older. The median age was 36.6 years. For every 100 females there were 91.8 males. For every 100 females age 18 and over, there were 88.8 males.

=== Income and poverty ===
The median income for a household in the borough was $41,155, and the median income for a family was $48,379. Males had a median income of $35,754 versus $30,872 for females. The per capita income for the borough was $21,749. About 7.0% of families and 10.3% of the population were below the poverty line, including 13.2% of those under age 18 and 8.4% of those age 65 or over.

== Notable people ==
- Fred Bear, American bow hunter, bow manufacturer, author, and television host
- Jeremiah S. Besore, Maryland state delegate
- Max Bishop, second baseman from 1924 through 1935 for the Philadelphia Athletics
- Tom Breneman, Hollywood radio personality, known for the Breakfast in Hollywood radio show
- Rip Engle, American former football coach
- John Goucher, Methodist pastor
- Roy Hess, American politician, entrepreneur, and private pilot
- Edward Thomas McCaffrey, American former professional football player
- Matthew Edward White, American former professional baseball pitcher

== See also ==
- Bloom Brothers Department Stores
- Anthony Wayne, Revolutionary War general
- Geiser Manufacturing, a leading Waynesboro manufacturer in its heyday
