= Pennsylvania Route 641 =

State highway in Pennsylvania, US

Pennsylvania Route 641
- PA 641 in red and PA 641 Truck in blue

Route information
- Maintained by PennDOT
- Length: 57.895 mi (93.173 km)

Major junctions
- West end: US 522 near Shade Gap
- PA 35 near Shade Gap; PA 75 in Spring Run; PA 997 in Roxbury; PA 696 in Newburg; PA 233 in Newville; US 11 / PA 34 / PA 74 in Carlisle; I-81 near Carlisle; PA 174 near Mechanicsburg; PA 114 in Mechanicsburg; US 11 / PA 581 in Camp Hill
- East end: US 11 / US 15 in Camp Hill

Location
- Country: United States
- State: Pennsylvania
- Counties: Huntingdon, Franklin, Cumberland

Highway system
- Pennsylvania State Route System; Interstate; US; State; Scenic; Legislative
← PA 639	→ PA 642

Pennsylvania Route 641 (PA 641) is a state route that is located in Central Pennsylvania in the United States. The route is 57.9 miles (93.2 km) long and runs from U.S. Route 522 (US 522) near Shade Gap east to US 11/US 15 in Camp Hill.

PA 641 heads east from Shade Gap in Huntingdon County and immediately crosses PA 35 before it heads across Tuscarora Mountain into Franklin County. The route intersects PA 75 in Spring Run before it crosses Kittatinny and Blue mountains and reaches a junction with PA 997 in Roxbury. PA 641 heads into the agricultural Cumberland Valley and enters Cumberland County, where it intersects PA 696 in Newburg and PA 233 in Newville before reaching Carlisle.

In Carlisle, the route runs concurrent with US 11 and PA 74 on High Street and crosses PA 34 in the center of town. East of here, PA 641 has an interchange with Interstate 81 (I-81) and heads to Mechanicsburg, where it intersects PA 114. The route continues through the western suburbs of Harrisburg and has an interchange with US 11/PA 581 before ending in Camp Hill. PA 641 has a truck route, PA 641 Truck, that bypasses the winding stretch across Kittatinny Mountain.

PA 641 was designated in 1928 to run from PA 74 in Carlisle east to US 11 (Carlisle Pike) in Camp Hill. The same year, the road between Shade Gap and east of Spring Run and for a short distance to the west of Roxbury became part of PA 433 while PA 333 was designated onto the road between Roxbury and Newburg.

In 1937, PA 641 was extended west to PA 433 east of Spring Run, replacing the portion of PA 333 between Roxbury and Newburg and running concurrent with PA 433 for a short distance to the west of Roxbury. The east end was moved to its current location at US 15 in the 1950s, with a realigned US 15 replacing the section of PA 641 north on 32nd Street to Carlisle Pike. In the 1960s, PA 641 was extended west to Shade Gap, replacing that stretch of PA 433 while the PA 433 designation was also removed from the road to the west of Roxbury.

== Route description ==
=== Huntingdon and Franklin counties ===
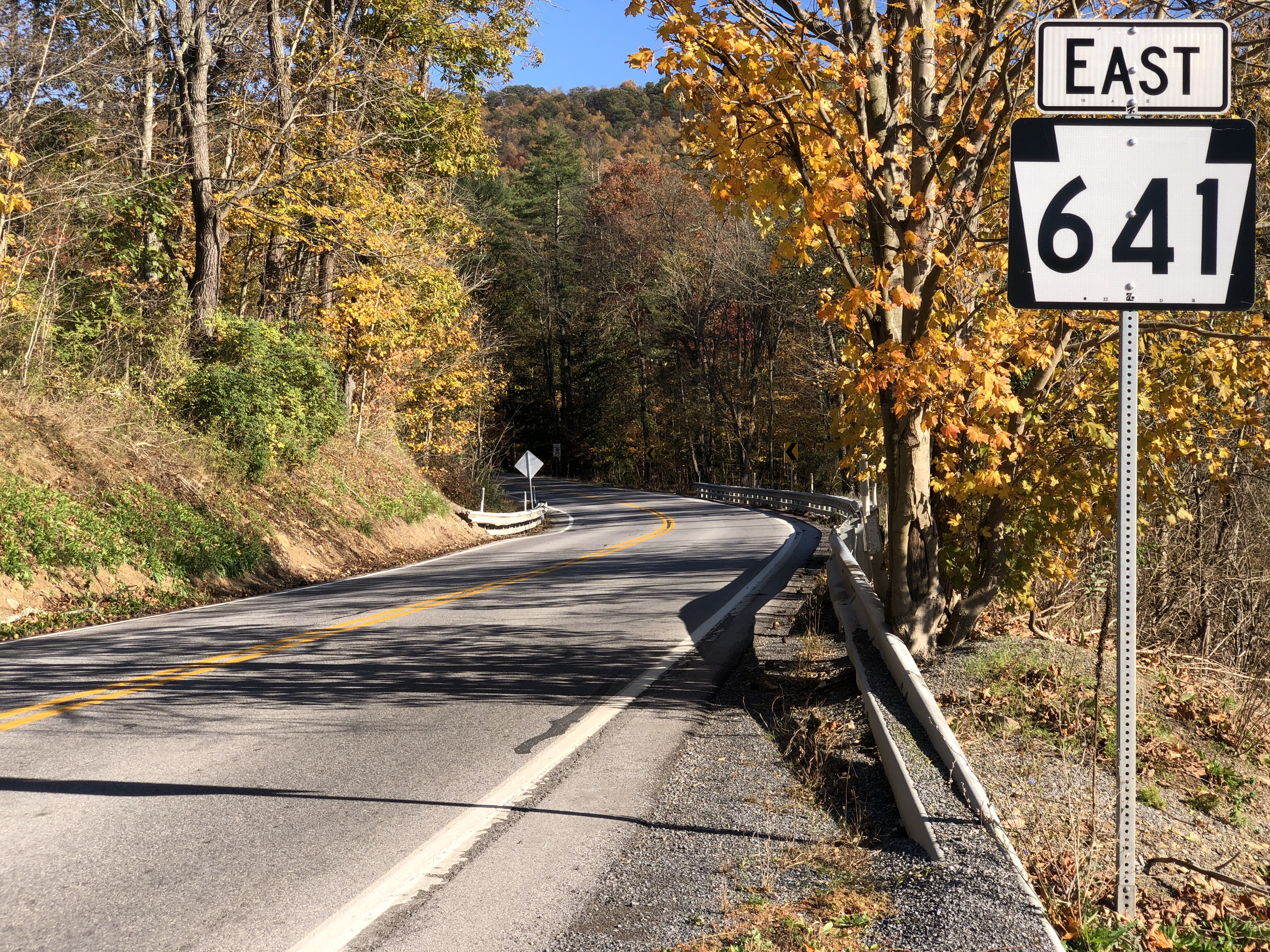
PA 641 eastbound in Dublin Township

PA 641 begins at an intersection with US 522 north of the borough of Shade Gap in Dublin Township, Huntingdon County, heading east on two-lane undivided road past homes and businesses and soon crossing PA 35. Past here, the road curves to the southeast and runs past more development before heading into forested areas. The route continues through woodland with sparse homes and curves to the east, running through a mix of fields and trees and passing through the community of Neelyton. PA 641 heads back into forests and turns northeast to ascend Tuscarora Mountain. The road makes a hairpin turn to the south and continues to climb the mountain.

At the summit of Tuscarora Mountain, the route enters Fannett Township in Franklin County and continues south as it begins to descend the mountain, making a hairpin turn to the northeast and becoming Spring Run Road. PA 641 makes another hairpin turn to the southwest before curving southeast to reach the base of the mountain. The road heads into farmland with some woods and homes, coming to an intersection with PA 75 in the community of Spring Run. From here, the route winds south through more farms and woods before passing to the west of a forested mountain.

PA 641 turns east and curves southeast to pass under the Pennsylvania Turnpike (I-76). Immediately after, the route turns south onto Timmons Road, with PA 641 Truck continuing east as Amberson Road. PA 641 continues through farmland with some woods before it curves east into forested areas, where it heads northeast to ascend Kittatinny Mountain. At the summit, the road makes a hairpin turn to the southeast to descend the mountain. The route curves northeast and then south to intersect the eastern terminus of PA 641 Truck at the base of the mountain.

PA 641 continues east into Lurgan Township and becomes Forge Hill Road, winding east through forests and traversing Blue Mountain. Past the mountain, the road heads east into the community of Roxbury, where it passes homes and a few businesses and comes to an intersection with PA 997. At this point, PA 997 turns east for a concurrency with PA 641 before it splits to the north. PA 641 continues east and leaves Roxbury, where it becomes Newburg Road and heads east-northeast through farmland with some trees and residences, passing through the community of Otterbein.

=== Cumberland County ===
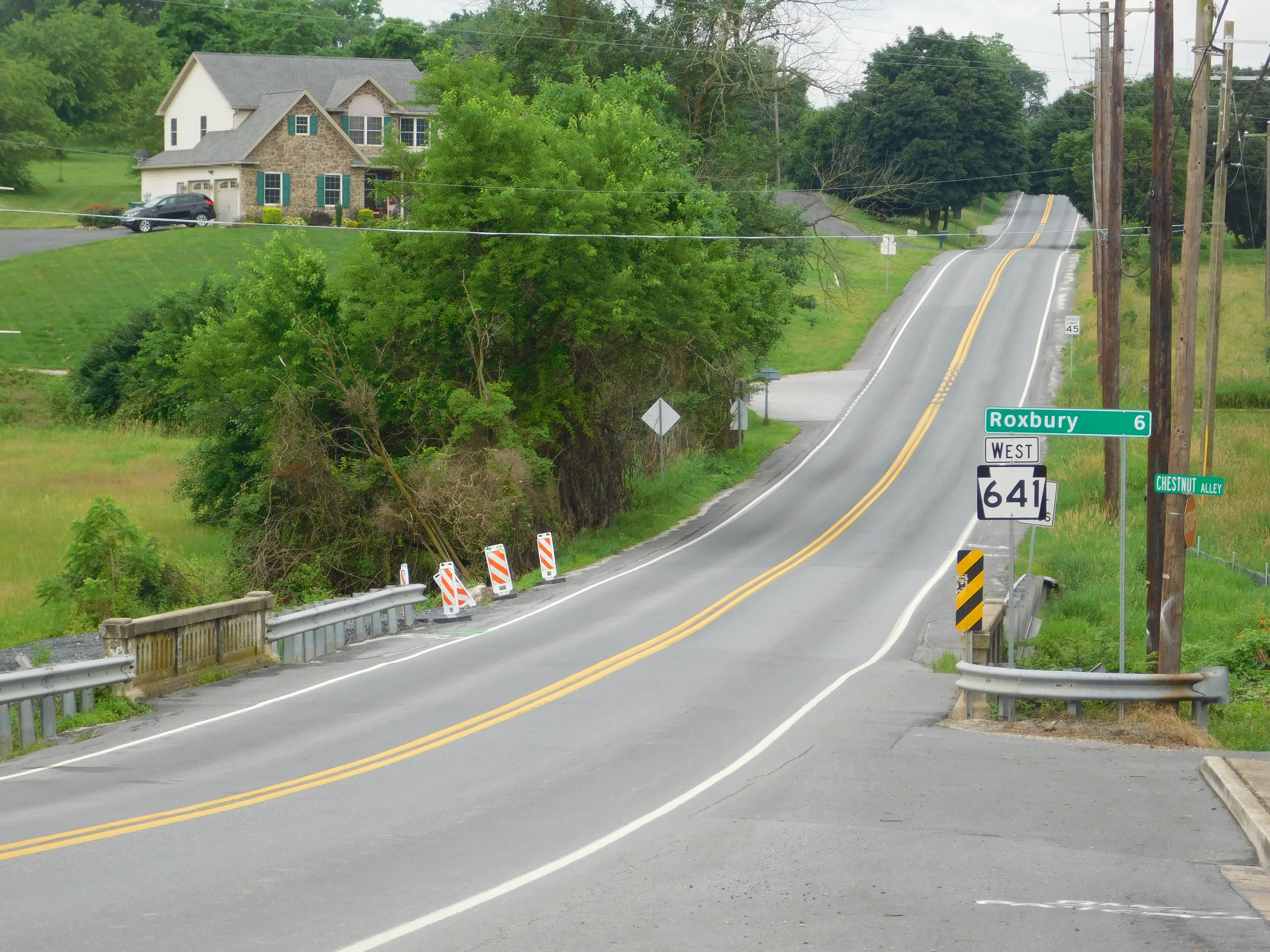
PA 641 westbound in Newburg

After crossing Laughlin Run, this route enters Hopewell Township in Cumberland County and continues through agricultural areas with a few homes. PA 641 enters the borough of Newburg and becomes West Main Street, passing homes and forming a one-block concurrency with PA 696. The road crosses High Street and becomes East Main Street, running past more residences before leaving Newburg for Hopewell Township again. Here, the route becomes Newville Road and runs east-northeast through farmland with scattered homes.

PA 641 heads east into a mix of fields and woods and crosses Conodoguinet Creek, curving northeast and heading into North Newton Township. The road becomes Greenspring Road and runs east through a mix of farms, woods, and homes. The route reaches the community of Green Spring and turns northeast, running through more rural areas with some development.

PA 641 becomes the border between North Newton Township to the north and the borough of Newville to the south before it fully enters Newville and becomes Main Street, passing homes. In the center of Newville, the route crosses PA 233 and continues through more of the borough. The road crosses Big Spring Creek and leaves Newville for West Pennsboro Township, where the name becomes Carlisle Road and it passes residences and a few businesses.

PA 641 continues northeast through farmland with some woods and homes, passing through Bears Crossroads and West Hill, where the name changes to Newville Road. At this point, the route runs a short distance to the south of the Pennsylvania Turnpike (I-76) and runs through a mix of farmland and residences before it heads through the community of Plainfield, where it becomes Main Street and passes homes and a few businesses. From here, the road becomes Newville Road again and heads through agricultural areas with some development, passing to the north of the community of Elliottson.

PA 641 enters North Middleton Township and passes between warehouses to the north and homes and fields to the south as it comes to an intersection with the northern terminus of PA 465. The road continues through a mix of residential and commercial development as it crosses into the borough of Carlisle. Here, PA 641 turns south onto North Orange Street and passes under Norfolk Southern's Shippensburg Secondary railroad line before it comes to an intersection with US 11.

At this point, PA 641 turns east for a concurrency with US 11 on West High Street, passing between the railroad tracks to the north and businesses to the south. The railroad tracks head further to the north and the road continues east through the campus of Dickinson College, passing to the north of a few homes and businesses. US 11/PA 641 runs through more of the college campus and comes to an intersection with PA 74, at which point that route joins US 11/PA 641 on West High Street. The three routes head into the commercial downtown of Carlisle, where it comes to an intersection with PA 34 at Hanover Street at the center of town adjacent to the Cumberland County Courthouse.

Here, US 11 turns north to follow PA 34 while PA 74/PA 641 continue east on East High Street, heading through more of the downtown. Past the downtown area, the road runs past homes before passing businesses as a three-lane road with a center left-turn lane. PA 74 splits from PA 641 by heading southeast on York Road, providing access to southbound I-81. PA 641 continues east along East High Street and passes north of The Point at Carlisle Plaza shopping mall, leaving Carlisle and becoming the border between North Middleton Township to the north and South Middleton Township to the south and heading into residential areas on two-lane West Trindle Road.

The route becomes the border between Middlesex Township to the north and South Middleton Township to the south and widens into a four-lane divided highway and reaches a partial interchange with I-81, providing access to the northbound lanes and from the southbound lanes of I-81.

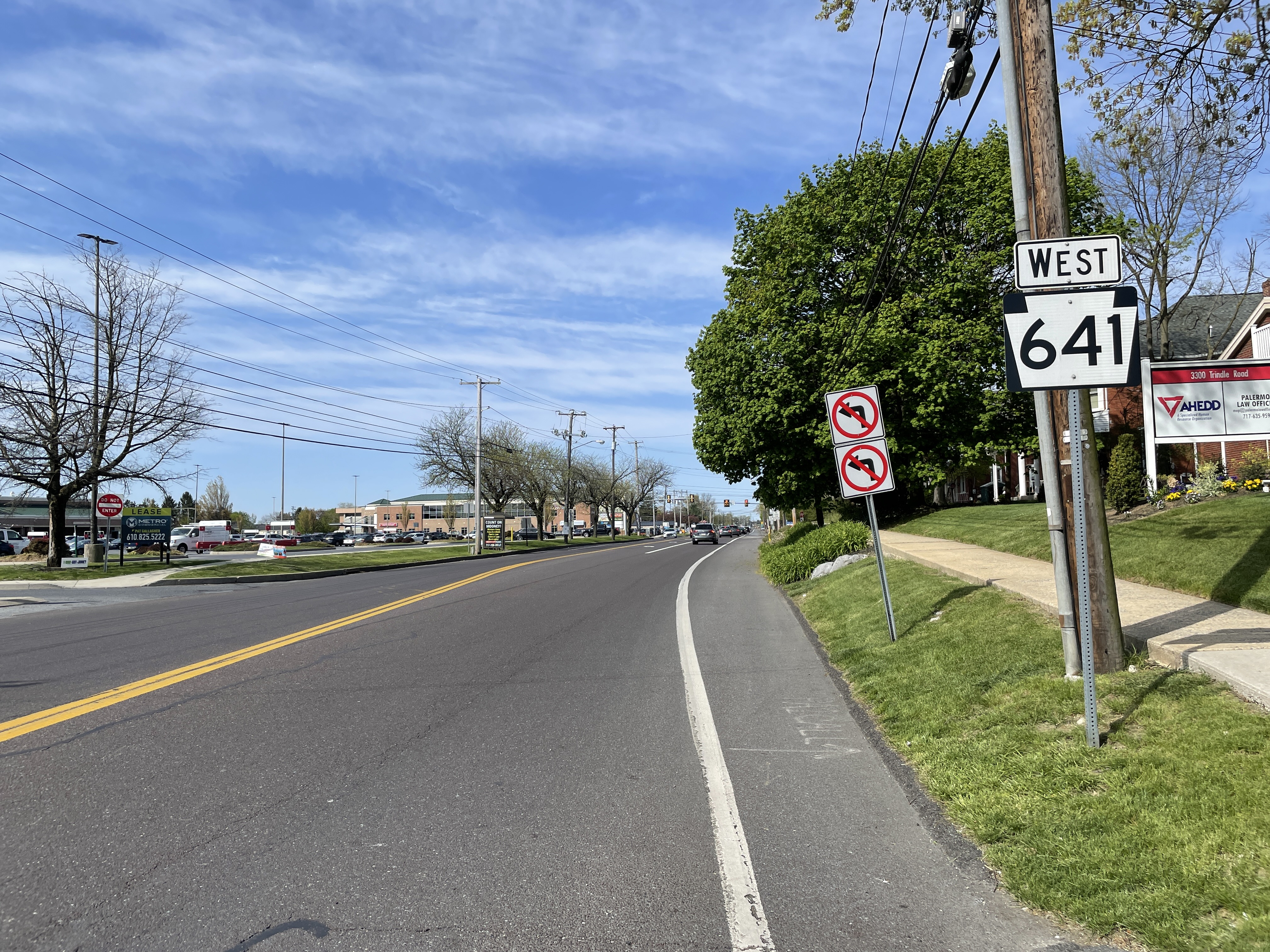
PA 641 westbound past eastern terminus at US 11/US 15 in Camp Hill

Past the I-81 interchange, the route passes businesses and narrows back to a two-lane undivided road. The road heads through farmland before heading through a mix of woods and homes and passing through the community of Hickorytown.

PA 641 continues through a mix of farms, woods, and residences, becoming the border between Silver Spring Township to the north and Monroe Township to the south, crossing the Appalachian Trail at Stony Ridge. Farther east, the roadway passes through the community of Locust Point. The route bends to the east-northeast and comes to an intersection with the eastern terminus of PA 174 in the community of Roxbury. The road comes to a bridge over the Pennsylvania Turnpike (I-76) and heads into residential areas, passing through the community of Trindle Spring. PA 641 enters the borough of Mechanicsburg and becomes West Main Street, passing a mix of homes and businesses. The route comes to an intersection with PA 114, which heads north (west), where that route forms a concurrency with PA 641. The two routes head into the commercial downtown of Mechanicsburg, where PA 114 splits to the south (east). PA 641 continues along East Main Street and runs through residential areas. The route heads into business areas and leaves Mechanicsburg for Hampden Township, where it becomes East Trindle Road and crosses Norfolk Southern's Shippensburg Secondary at-grade. The road continues northeast past homes and commercial establishments a short distance to the south of Naval Support Activity Mechanicsburg.

PA 641 passes under a Norfolk Southern branch line serving the naval facility and continues through developed areas. The route comes to a partial interchange with the US 11/PA 581 freeway (Capital Beltway), with access to northbound US 11/eastbound PA 581 and from southbound US 11/westbound PA 581. Past this interchange, the road continues through residential and commercial areas, entering the borough of Camp Hill. Here, PA 641 becomes a three-lane road with a center left-turn lane and passes north of the Camp Hill Shopping Center before it comes to its eastern terminus at an intersection with US 11/US 15. Past this intersection, the road continues east as Chestnut Street, a local street.

== History ==
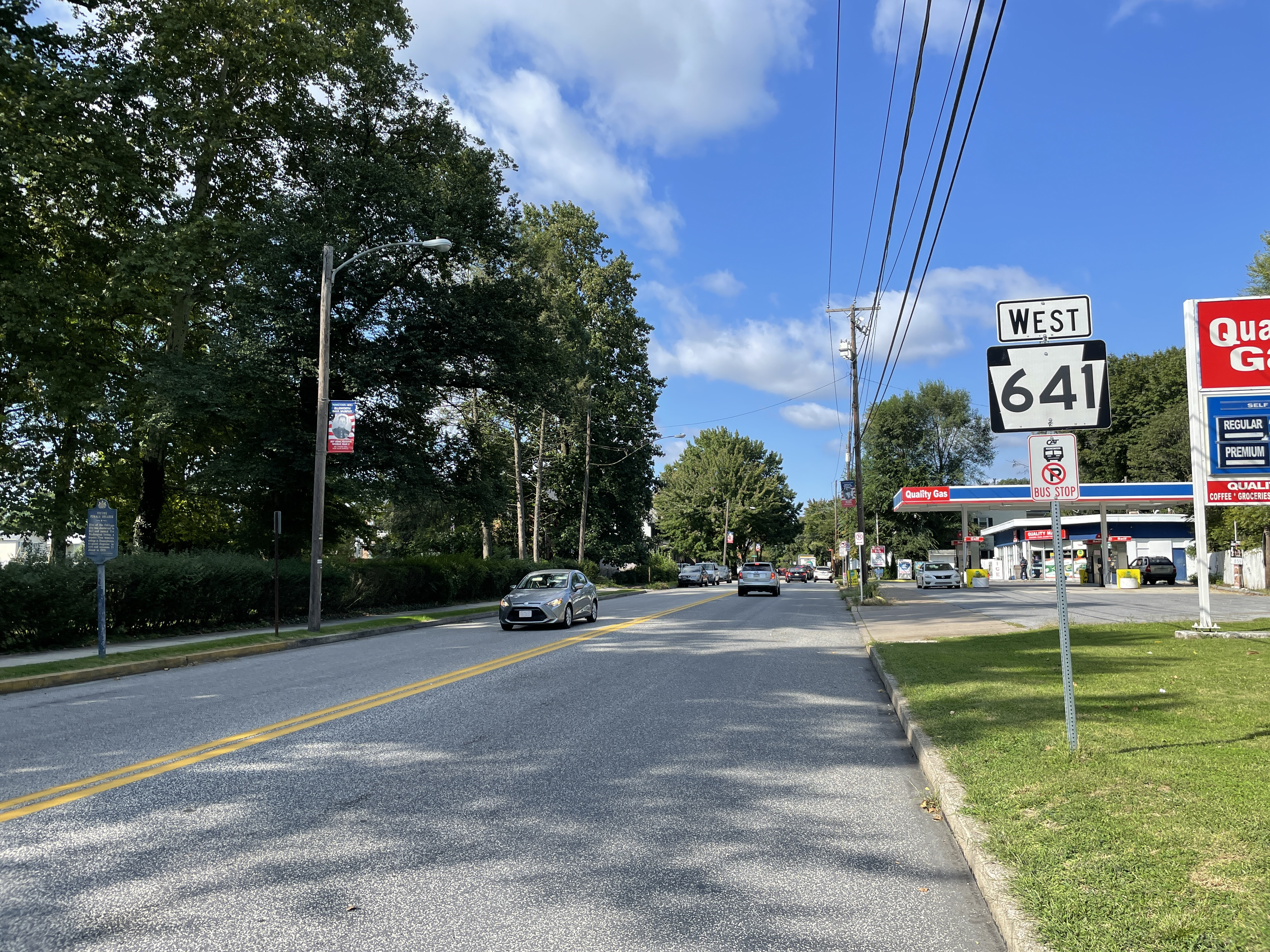
PA 641 westbound entering Mechanicsburg

When Pennsylvania legislated routes in 1911, what is now PA 641 was designated as part of Legislative Route 121 between Shade Gap and Spring Run and as part of Legislative Route 264 between Spring Run and Roxbury. At this time, the current alignment of the route between Carlisle and Camp Hill was a paved road. PA 641 was designated in 1928 to run from PA 74 in Carlisle east to US 11 (Market Street) in Camp Hill, following its current alignment east before turning north on 32nd Street to US 11. The same year, PA 433 was designated onto the road between US 522 in Shade Gap and Amberson Road and between Cold Spring Road and Roxbury while PA 333 was designated onto the road between Roxbury and Newburg, both these sections of PA 433 and PA 333 were unpaved. The road between Newburg and Carlisle was an unnumbered road that was unpaved between Newburg and Green Spring and paved between Green Spring and Carlisle.

In 1937, PA 641 was extended west from Carlisle to PA 433 at the intersection of Amberson Road and Timmons Road, following its current alignment. The route ran concurrent with PA 433 between Roxbury and Cold Spring Road. The extended PA 641 designation replaced PA 333 between Roxbury and Newburg. The entire length of PA 641 was paved in the 1930s along with the section of PA 433 between Shade Gap and the western terminus of PA 641. The eastern terminus of PA 641 was moved to its present location at US 15 in the 1950s, with a rerouted US 15 replacing the route along 32nd Street. In the 1960s, PA 641 was extended west to its current terminus at US 522 in Shade Gap, replacing the section of PA 433 between Shade Gap and Amberson Road. In addition, the concurrent PA 433 designation was removed from PA 641 between Cold Spring Road and Roxbury.

== Major intersections ==
County	Location	mi	km	Destinations	Notes
Huntingdon	Dublin Township	0.000	0.000	US 522 – McConnellsburg, Mount Union	Western terminus
Huntingdon	Dublin Township	0.152	0.245	PA 35 – Mifflin, Shade Gap	
Franklin	Fannett Township	8.413	13.539	PA 75 (Path Valley Road) to Penna Turnpike – Dry Run, Fort Loudon	
Franklin	Fannett Township	10.043	16.163	PA 641 Truck east (Amberson Road) – Amberson, Roxbury	Western terminus of PA 641 Truck
Franklin	Fannett Township	14.025	22.571	PA 641 Truck west (Cold Spring Road)	Eastern terminus of PA 641 Truck
Franklin	Lurgan Township	16.988	27.340	PA 997 south (Cumberland Highway) – Letterkenny Army Depot, Pleasant Hall, Shippensburg, Chambersburg	West end of PA 997 concurrency
Franklin	Lurgan Township	17.124	27.558	PA 997 north (Cumberland Highway) to Penna Turnpike	East end of PA 997 concurrency
Cumberland	Newburg	22.977	36.978	PA 696 north (Mountain Street) to Penna Turnpike	West end of PA 696 concurrency
Cumberland	Newburg	23.023	37.052	PA 696 south (Water Street) – Shippensburg	East end of PA 696 concurrency
Cumberland	Newville	32.042	51.567	PA 233 (High Street) to I-81 – Doubling Gap	
Cumberland	North Middleton Township	40.879	65.788	PA 465 south (Allen Road) to I-81	Northern terminus of PA 465
Cumberland	Carlisle	42.778	68.845	US 11 south (Ritner Highway) to I-81	West end of US 11 concurrency
Cumberland	Carlisle	43.398	69.842	PA 74 north (College Street)	West end PA 74 concurrency
Cumberland	Carlisle	43.790	70.473	US 11 north / PA 34 (Hanover Street) to I-81	East end of US 11 concurrency
Cumberland	Carlisle	44.333	71.347	PA 74 south (York Road) to I-81 south	East end of PA 74 concurrency
Cumberland	Middlesex Township	45.394– 45.413	73.055– 73.085	I-81 north – Harrisburg	Exit 49 (I-81); access from I-81 south and to I-81 north only
Cumberland	Monroe Township	51.220	82.431	PA 174 west (Boiling Springs Road) – Williams Grove, Boiling Springs	Eastern terminus of PA 174
Cumberland	Mechanicsburg	53.316	85.804	PA 114 west (York Street)	West end of PA 114 concurrency
Cumberland	Mechanicsburg	53.613	86.282	PA 114 east (Market Street)	East end of PA 114 concurrency
Cumberland	Hampden Township	56.938	91.633	US 11 north / PA 581 east (Harrisburg Expressway/Capital Beltway) to I-83 – Harrisburg, Hershey, York	Exit 4 (US 11 / PA 581); access from US 11 south/PA 581 west and to US 11 north/PA 581 east only
Cumberland	Camp Hill	57.895	93.173	US 11 / US 15 (32nd Street) – Harrisburg, Dillsburg, Gettysburg	Eastern terminus
1.000 mi = 1.609 km; 1.000 km = 0.621 mi: Concurrency terminus; Incomplete access

== PA 641 Truck ==
Pennsylvania Route 641 Truck
- Location: Franklin County, Pennsylvania
- Length: 8.375 mi (13.478 km)

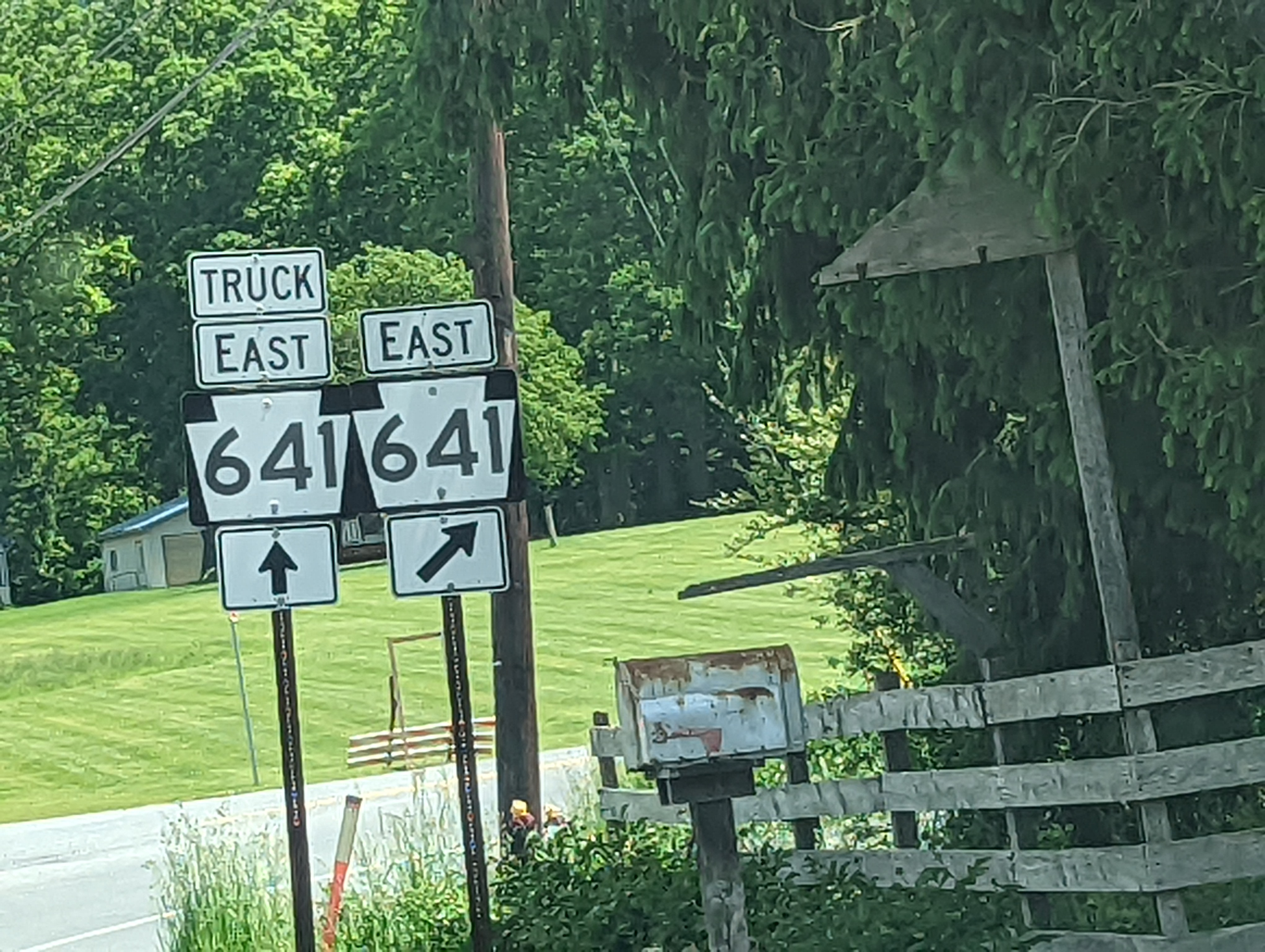
PA 641 Truck begins eastbound from mainline PA 641 and continues along Amberson Road in Franklin County

Pennsylvania Route 641 Truck (PA 641 Truck) is an 8.4-mile-long (13.5 km) truck route of PA 641 in Fannett Township in Franklin County that bypasses a winding section of PA 641 that crosses Kittatinny Mountain. PA 641 Truck begins at PA 641 by heading east-southeast on two-lane undivided Amberson Road, which is designated as State Route 4006 (SR 4006). The road soon turns to the northeast and runs through a mix of farmland and woodland, with the Pennsylvania Turnpike (I-76) parallel to the northwest. The truck route heads through the community of Laurel Grove before it passes under the Pennsylvania Turnpike. PA 641 Truck curves to the east and runs through farmland before it turns southeast onto Cold Spring Road, still following SR 4006. The road curves to the south as it comes to a bridge over the Pennsylvania Turnpike just west of the Kittatinny Mountain Tunnel. The truck route heads southwest through forested areas as it traverses Kittatinny Mountain. PA 641 Truck reaches its eastern terminus at another intersection with PA 641 between Kittatinny and Blue mountains.

In 1928, Amberson Road and Cold Spring Road were designated as part of PA 433; both roads were unpaved. This section of PA 433 was paved in the 1930s. The PA 433 designation was removed from Amberson Road and Cold Spring Road in the 1960s, leaving these roads unnumbered. With the creation of the Location Referencing System in 1987, Amberson Road and Cold Spring Road were designated as SR 4006. PA 641 Truck was assigned to its current alignment by 1991.
