= Pennsylvania Route 174 =

State highway in Cumberland County, Pennsylvania, US

Pennsylvania Route 174

Route information
- Maintained by PennDOT
- Length: 28.088 mi (45.203 km)

Major junctions
- West end: US 11 / PA 533 in Shippensburg
- I-81 near Shippensburg; PA 233 in Penn Township; PA 465 in Dickinson Township; PA 34 near Mount Holly Springs; PA 74 near Boiling Springs
- East end: PA 641 in Monroe Township

Location
- Country: United States
- State: Pennsylvania
- Counties: Cumberland

Highway system
- Pennsylvania State Route System; Interstate; US; State; Scenic; Legislative
← PA 173	→ I-176

Pennsylvania Route 174 (PA 174) is a 28-mile-long (45 km) state highway located in Cumberland County, Pennsylvania. The western terminus is at U.S. Route 11 (US 11)/PA 533 in Shippensburg. The eastern terminus is at PA 641 in Monroe Township. PA 174 is a two-lane undivided road that runs through farmland in southern Cumberland County. The route heads east from Shippensburg and comes to an interchange with Interstate 81 (I-81). PA 174 continues through rural land, intersecting PA 233 in Dickinson, PA 465 in Mooredale, and PA 34 north of Mount Holly Springs before passing through Boiling Springs. From here, the route heads northeast and crosses PA 74 before coming to its end at PA 641 west of Mechanicsburg.

The portion of the present-day route west of PA 465 in Mooredale became part of US 11 and PA 13 in 1926, with the latter designation removed two years later. PA 174 was designated in 1928 between Boiling Springs and PA 641 west of Mechanicsburg. In 1937, the route was extended west from Boiling Springs to US 11 in Mooredale. US 11 and PA 33 switched alignments between Shippensburg and Carlisle in 1941, with PA 33 designated onto the present-day route west of Mooredale. In the 1960s, PA 33 was decommissioned and PA 174 was extended west to US 11/PA 533 in Shippensburg.

== Route description ==
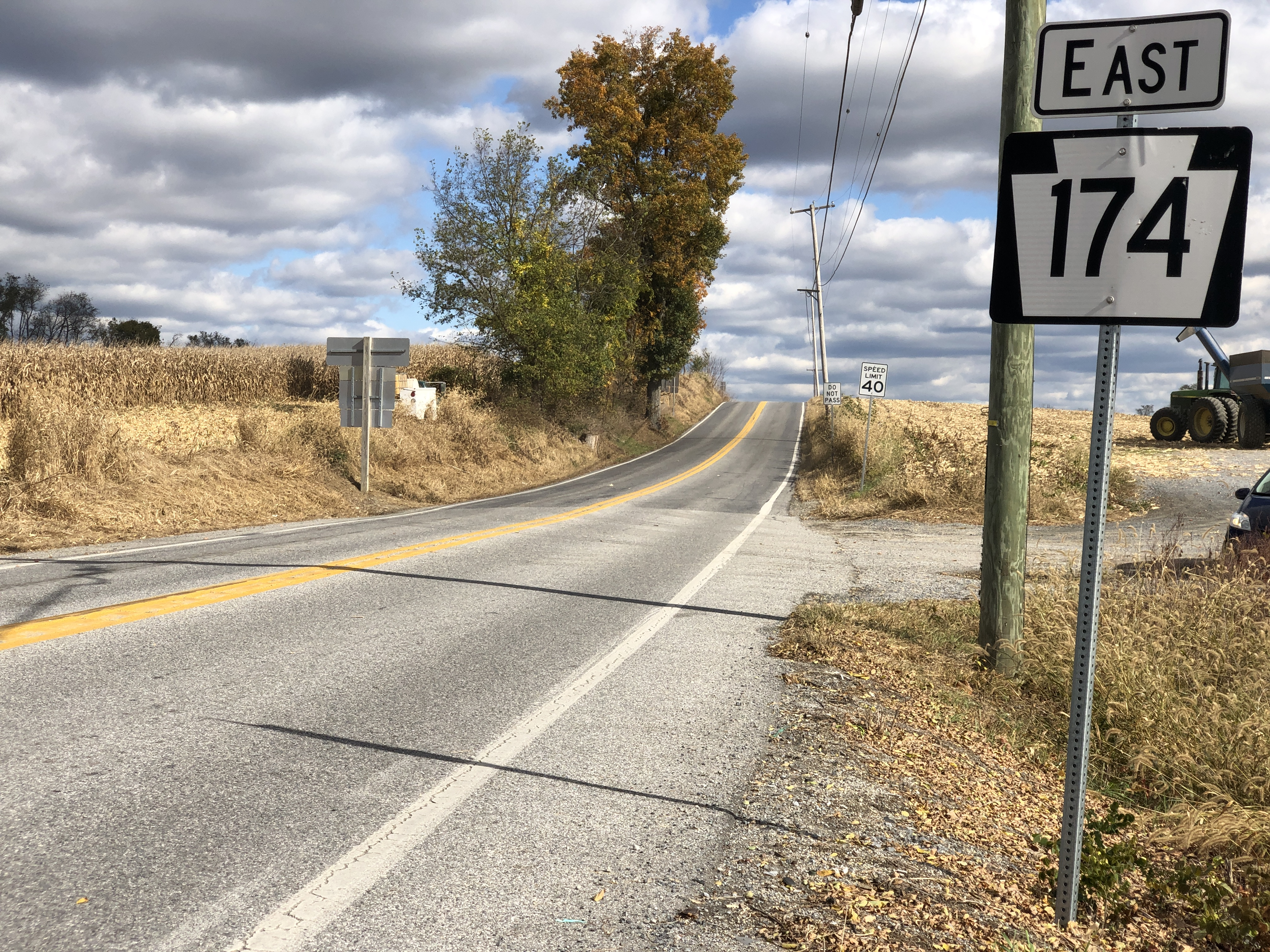
PA 174 eastbound past PA 34 in South Middleton Township

PA 174 begins at an intersection with US 11/PA 533 in the borough of Shippensburg, heading east on two-lane undivided Walnut Bottom Road. The road forms the border between Shippensburg to the south and Shippensburg Township to the north, passing through residential and commercial areas. The route fully enters Shippensburg Township and passes more businesses along with some fields, reaching a diamond interchange with I-81. Past the I-81 interchange, PA 174 continues into Southampton Township and heads into agricultural areas with sparse homes, passing through the community of Lees Cross Roads. At this point, the route begins to run a short distance to the north of Norfolk Southern's Lurgan Branch. The road heads into South Newton Township and becomes West Main Street, turning northeast and passing rural areas of homes in the communities of New Lancaster and Brookside. In the residential community of Walnut Bottom, PA 174 becomes East Main Street. The road heads east into Penn Township and becomes Walnut Bottom Road again, heading farther north from the Lurgan Branch and running through a mix of farms and woods. The route continues through more open areas of agriculture as it passes through the communities of Hockersville and Centerville, reaching an intersection with PA 233 after the latter. PA 174 continues through more farmland with some homes, passing through Cumminstown before entering Dickinson Township and intersecting PA 465 in Mooredale.

At this point, PA 465 continues along Walnut Bottom Road and PA 174 heads east along West Old York Road, passing through more agricultural areas. The route heads into South Middleton Township and crosses PA 34, becoming East Old York Road at that point. The road continues east and passes through the residential community of Boiling Springs on 1st Street, where it follows the Appalachian Trail for a short distance. PA 174 crosses into Monroe Township and becomes Boiling Springs Road, passing through Allenberry. From here, the road turns northeast past more farms and crosses PA 74 before heading through Churchtown. PA 174 heads through more agricultural areas with some residences before coming to its eastern terminus at PA 641.

== History ==
When Pennsylvania legislated routes in 1911, Walnut Bottom Road was designated as part of Legislative Route 35, which ran between Chambersburg and Carlisle. By 1926, PA 13 was designated along Walnut Bottom Road, which was paved. With the creation of the U.S. Highway System in 1926, US 11 was designated along Walnut Bottom Road, concurrent with PA 13. The concurrent PA 13 designation was removed from US 11 in 1928. PA 174 was designated in 1928 to run from Boiling Springs northeast to PA 641 west of Mechanicsburg along a paved road. From Boiling Springs, an unnumbered, unpaved road continued west to PA 34. By 1930, the present-day route between US 11 (Walnut Bottom Road) and PA 34 was an unnumbered, unpaved road.

PA 174 was extended west from Boiling Springs to US 11 (Walnut Bottom Road) in Mooredale in 1937. The entire length of the route was paved in the 1930s. In 1941, US 11 switched alignments with PA 33 between Shippensburg and Carlisle, with US 11 moved to its current alignment between the two towns and PA 33 being designated onto Walnut Bottom Road. In 1963, PA 33 was decommissioned and PA 174 was extended west along Walnut Bottom Road from Mooredale to US 11/PA 533 in Shippensburg.

== Major intersections ==
The entire route is in Cumberland County.

Location	mi	km	Destinations	Notes
Shippensburg	0.000	0.000	US 11 / PA 533 (King Street) – Chambersburg, Harrisburg	Western terminus
Southampton Township	1.559	2.509	I-81 – Carlisle, Chambersburg	Exit 29 (I-81)
Penn Township	10.472	16.853	PA 233 to I-81 – Newville, Pine Grove Furnace	
Dickinson Township	12.749	20.518	PA 465 north (Walnut Bottom Road) to I-81	Southern terminus of PA 465
Mount Holly Springs	18.080	29.097	PA 34 (Holly Pike) – Carlisle, Mt. Holly Springs	
Monroe Township	24.059	38.719	PA 74 (York Road) – Carlisle, Williams Grove, Dillsburg	
Monroe Township	28.088	45.203	PA 641 (Trindle Road) – Carlisle, Mechanicsburg	Eastern terminus
1.000 mi = 1.609 km; 1.000 km = 0.621 mi
