= Fannett =

Fannett can refer to:

- Fannett Township, Pennsylvania
- Fannett, Texas
- Fanad, County Donegal, Ireland, a peninsula once known as Fannett
