= Pennsylvania Route 465 =

State highway in Cumberland County, Pennsylvania, US

Pennsylvania Route 465

Route information
- Maintained by PennDOT
- Length: 6.644 mi (10.692 km)
- Existed: 1961–present

Major junctions
- South end: PA 174 in Mooreville
- I-81 near Carlisle; US 11 in Carlisle
- North end: PA 641 near Carlisle

Location
- Country: United States
- State: Pennsylvania
- Counties: Cumberland

Highway system
- Pennsylvania State Route System; Interstate; US; State; Scenic; Legislative
← PA 464	→ PA 466

Pennsylvania Route 465 (PA 465) is a 6.64-mile-long (10.69 km) state highway located in Cumberland County, Pennsylvania. The southern terminus is at PA 174 in Mooredale. The northern terminus is at PA 641 outside of Carlisle. PA 465 heads northeast from PA 174 along Walnut Bottom Road, passing through farmland. The route reaches developed areas on the western edge of Carlisle and turns north onto Allen Road, intersecting Interstate 81 (I-81) and U.S. Route 11 (US 11) before ending at PA 641. Walnut Bottom Road became part of US 11 and PA 13 in 1926, with the latter designation removed two years later. US 11 and PA 33 switched alignments between Shippensburg and Carlisle in 1941, with PA 33 designated onto Walnut Bottom Road. PA 465 was designated to its present alignment in the 1960s, replacing the PA 33 designation along Walnut Bottom Road.

== Route description ==
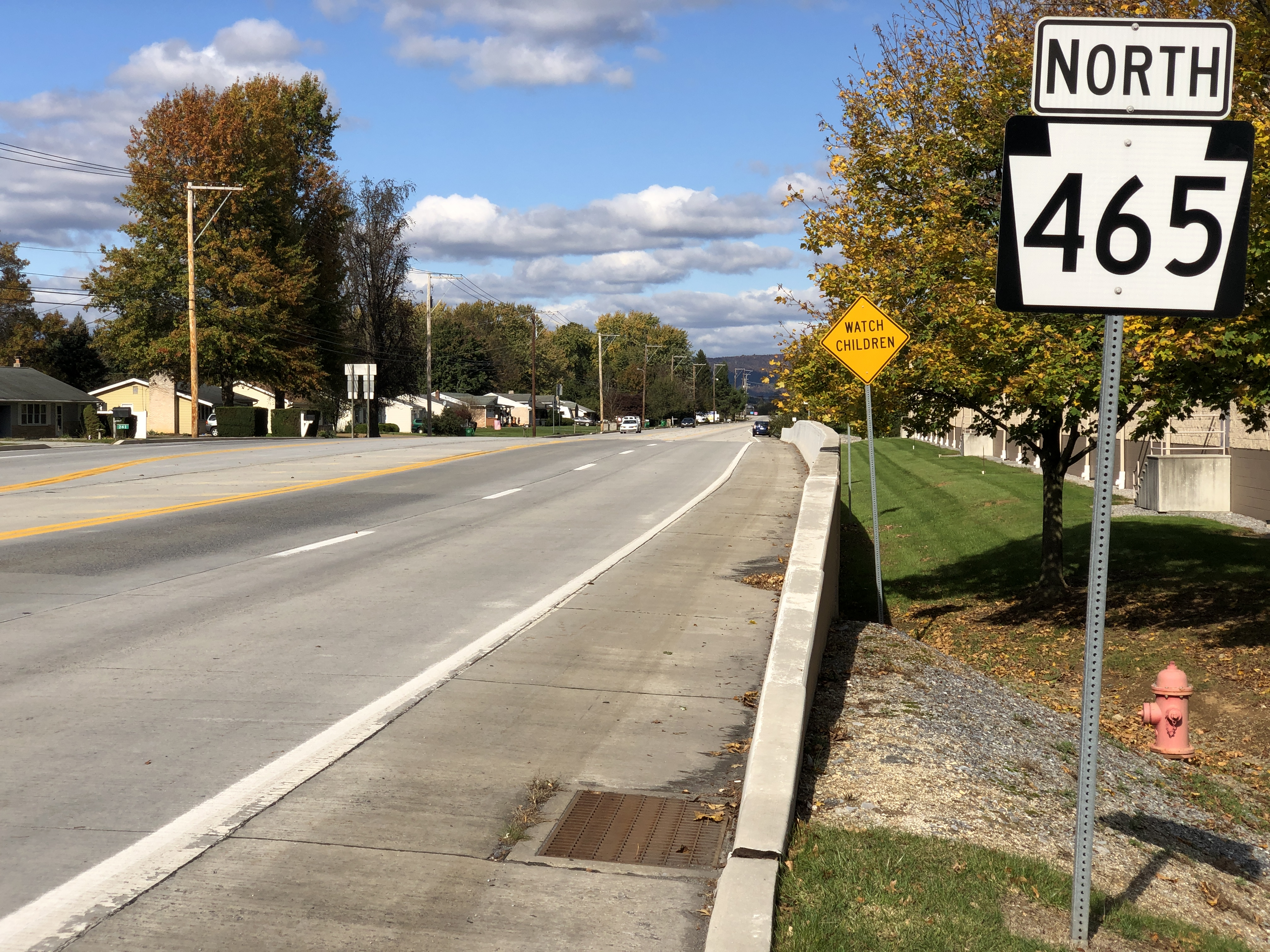
PA 465 northbound past US 11 in Carlisle

PA 465 begins at an intersection with PA 174 in the community of Mooredale in Dickinson Township, heading northeast on two-lane undivided Walnut Bottom Road. The road passes through open agricultural areas with occasional patches of woods. Upon crossing into South Middleton Township, the route turns north onto Allen Road and heads past industrial warehouses. PA 465 comes to an interchange with I-81 and continues into the borough of Carlisle, passing woods to the west and warehouses to the east. The route intersects US 11 and passes near farmland and distribution centers. After entering North Middleton Township, PA 465 reaches its northern terminus at PA 641.

== History ==
When Pennsylvania legislated routes in 1911, Walnut Bottom Road was designated as part of Legislative Route 35, which ran between Chambersburg and Carlisle. By 1926, PA 13 was designated along Walnut Bottom Road, which was paved. With the creation of the U.S. Highway System in 1926, US 11 was designated along Walnut Bottom Road, concurrent with PA 13. The concurrent PA 13 designation was removed from US 11 in 1928. In 1941, US 11 switched alignments with PA 33 between Shippensburg and Carlisle, with US 11 moved to its current alignment between the two towns and PA 33 being designated onto Walnut Bottom Road. In the 1960s, PA 33 was decommissioned and PA 465 was designated to run from PA 174 in Mooredale north to PA 641 west of Carlisle, following its current alignment on Walnut Bottom Road and Allen Road.

== Major intersections ==
The entire route is in Cumberland County.

Location	mi	km	Destinations	Notes
Dickinson Township	0.000	0.000	PA 174 (Walnut Bottom Road/Old York Road)	Southern terminus
South Middleton Township	5.440	8.755	I-81 – Carlisle, Chambersburg	Exit 44 (I-81)
Carlisle	5.916	9.521	US 11 (Ritner Highway) – Carlisle, Shippensburg	
North Middleton Township	6.644	10.692	PA 641 (Carlisle Newville Road)	Northern terminus
1.000 mi = 1.609 km; 1.000 km = 0.621 mi
