= Concord, Pennsylvania =

Unincorporated community in Pennsylvania, US

- Unincorporated community
- Location within Pennsylvania Location within the United States
- Coordinates: 40°15′06″N 77°42′01″W
- Country: United States
- State: Pennsylvania
- County: Franklin
- Township: Fannett
- Elevation: 876 ft (267 m)
- Time zone: UTC-5 (Eastern (EST))
  - Summer (DST): UTC-4 (EDT)
- ZIP code: 17217
- Area code: 717
- GNIS feature ID: 1172280

Concord is an unincorporated community in Fannett Township, Franklin County, Pennsylvania, United States. The community lies on the South side of Tuscarora Mountain, straddling Pennsylvania Route 75, and is 9.6 miles (15.4 km) south-southwest of East Waterford. Concord has a post office, with ZIP code 17217.

Concord was platted in 1797, and named after the Battle of Concord. A post office called Concord has been in operation since 1811.
