= Neelyton, Pennsylvania =

Unincorporated community in Pennsylvania, US

- Unincorporated community
- Location within Pennsylvania Location within the United States
- Coordinates: 40°09′39″N 77°49′21″W
- Country: United States
- State: Pennsylvania
- County: Huntingdon
- Township: Dublin
- Elevation: 984 ft (300 m)
- Time zone: UTC-5 (Eastern (EST))
  - Summer (DST): UTC-4 (EDT)
- ZIP code: 17239
- Area code: 814
- GNIS feature ID: 1182212

Neelyton is an unincorporated community in Huntingdon County, Pennsylvania, United States. The community is located along Pennsylvania Route 641, 2.7 miles (4.3 km) southeast of Shade Gap. Neelyton has a post office with ZIP code 17239.
