= Boiling Springs Tavern =

The Boiling Springs Tavern
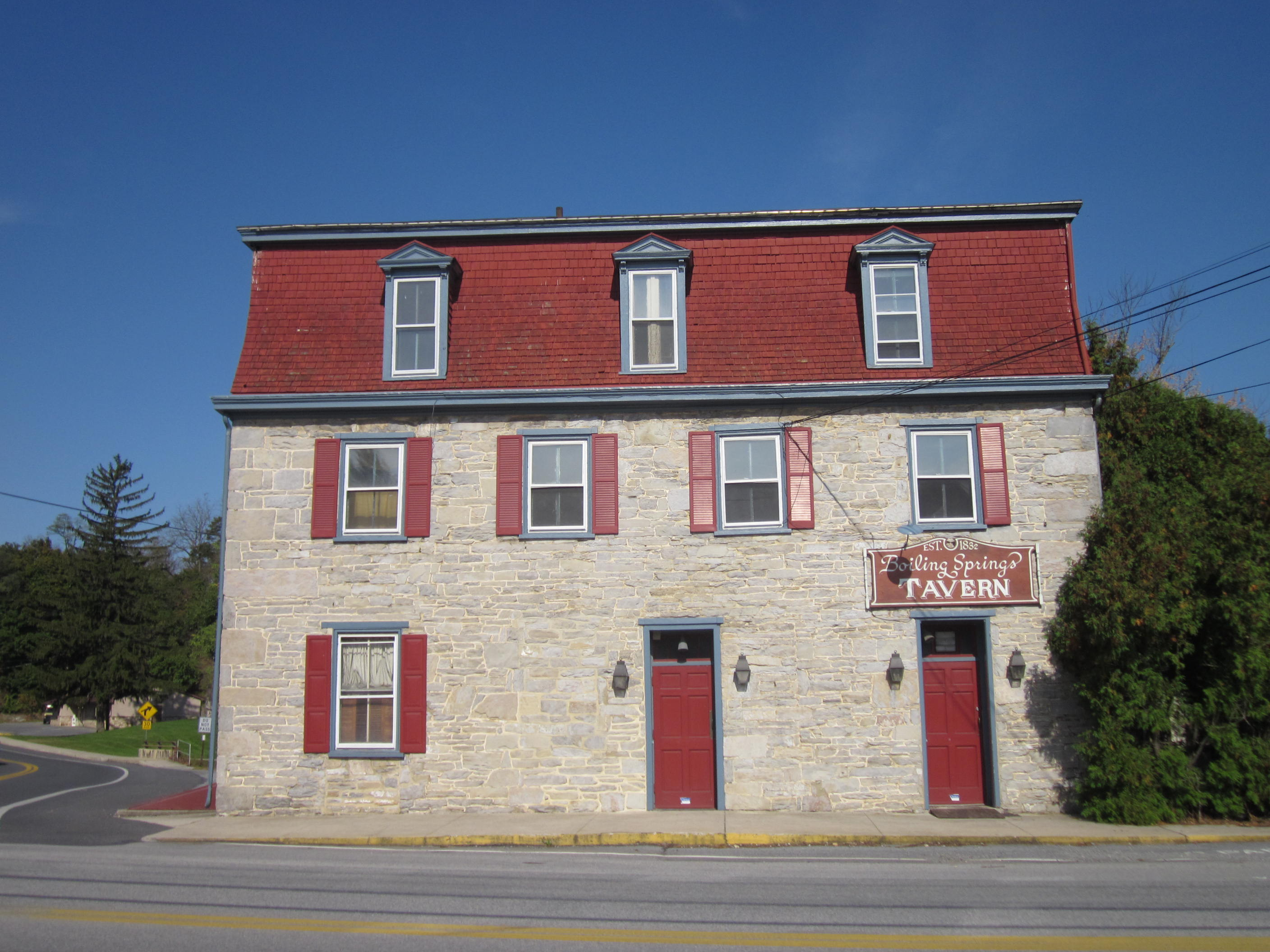
- Interactive map of The Boiling Springs Tavern

Restaurant information
- Established: 1832
- Closed: 2020
- Owners: Terry & Kathleen Rickert
- Food type: American Cuisine
- Dress code: Casual
- Location: 1 East 1st Street, Boiling Springs, Pennsylvania, 17007, United States
- Coordinates: 40°09′01″N 77°07′43″W
- Reservations: Not required but suggested
- Website: BoilingSpringsTavern.net

The Boiling Springs Tavern was a restaurant located in Boiling Springs, Pennsylvania.

The Boiling Springs Tavern was built in 1832 by Philip Brechbill in the Federal style with native limestone and originally was used as a hotel. Anheuser-Busch was its first owner.

Today the Boiling Springs Tavern is closed and has been since the COVID-19 pandemic. It was previously a restaurant and bar. It was purchased by Terry Rickert in 2020.
