= Boiling Springs Historic District =

Historic district in Pennsylvania, United States

- U.S. National Register of Historic Places
- U.S. Historic district
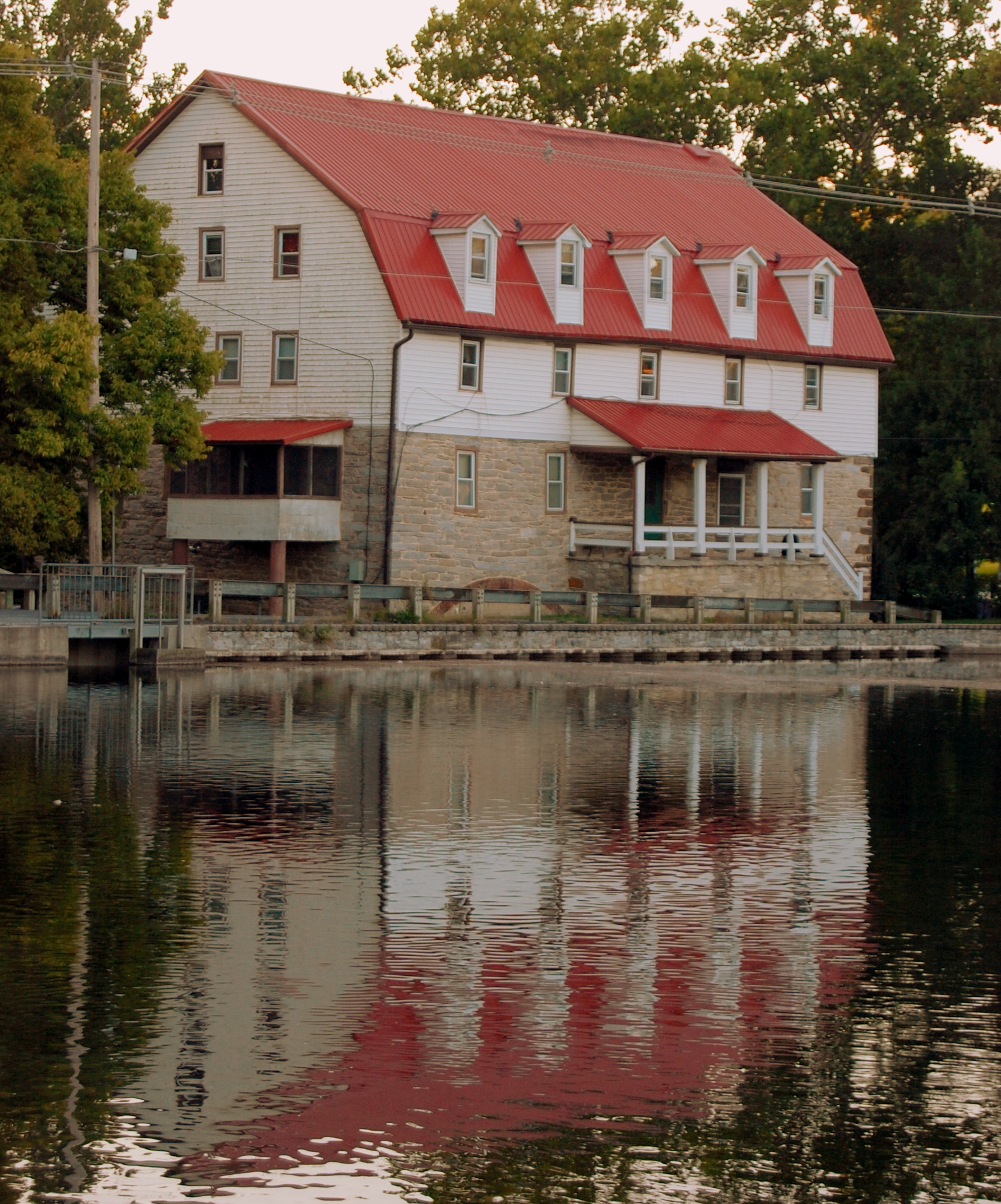
- A Mill in the Boiling Springs Historic District

- Location within Pennsylvania Location within the United States
- Location: Roughly bounded by High and First Sts., Boiling Springs Lake, and Yellow Breeches Creek, Boiling Springs, Pennsylvania
- Coordinates: 40°08′54″N 77°07′40″W
- Area: 27.9 acres (11.3 ha)
- Built: c. 1750
- Architect: Multiple
- Architectural style: Bungalow/craftsman, Late Victorian, Federal
- NRHP reference No.: 84000566
- Added to NRHP: December 3, 1984

Boiling Springs Historic District is a national historic district located at Boiling Springs, Cumberland County, Pennsylvania. The district includes 127 contributing buildings, 1 contributing site, and 1 contributing structure associated with its role as an early iron manufacturing center and surrounding residential areas of Boiling Springs. Most of the contributing buildings date to the mid-19th century starting in 1845, with a few dated to the early period of development. The oldest buildings are a grist mill (c. 1750), the ironmaster's, Michael Ege, mansion (1795), and the restored Boiling Springs Tavern (1832). Other notable non-residential buildings include the former stone stables (1829) and forge building (1850s). Residential areas include notable examples of the Bungalow/craftsman, Late Victorian, and Federal styles. The contributing structure is a stone three-arched bridge (1854).

It was added to the National Register of Historic Places in 1984.

== Gallery ==
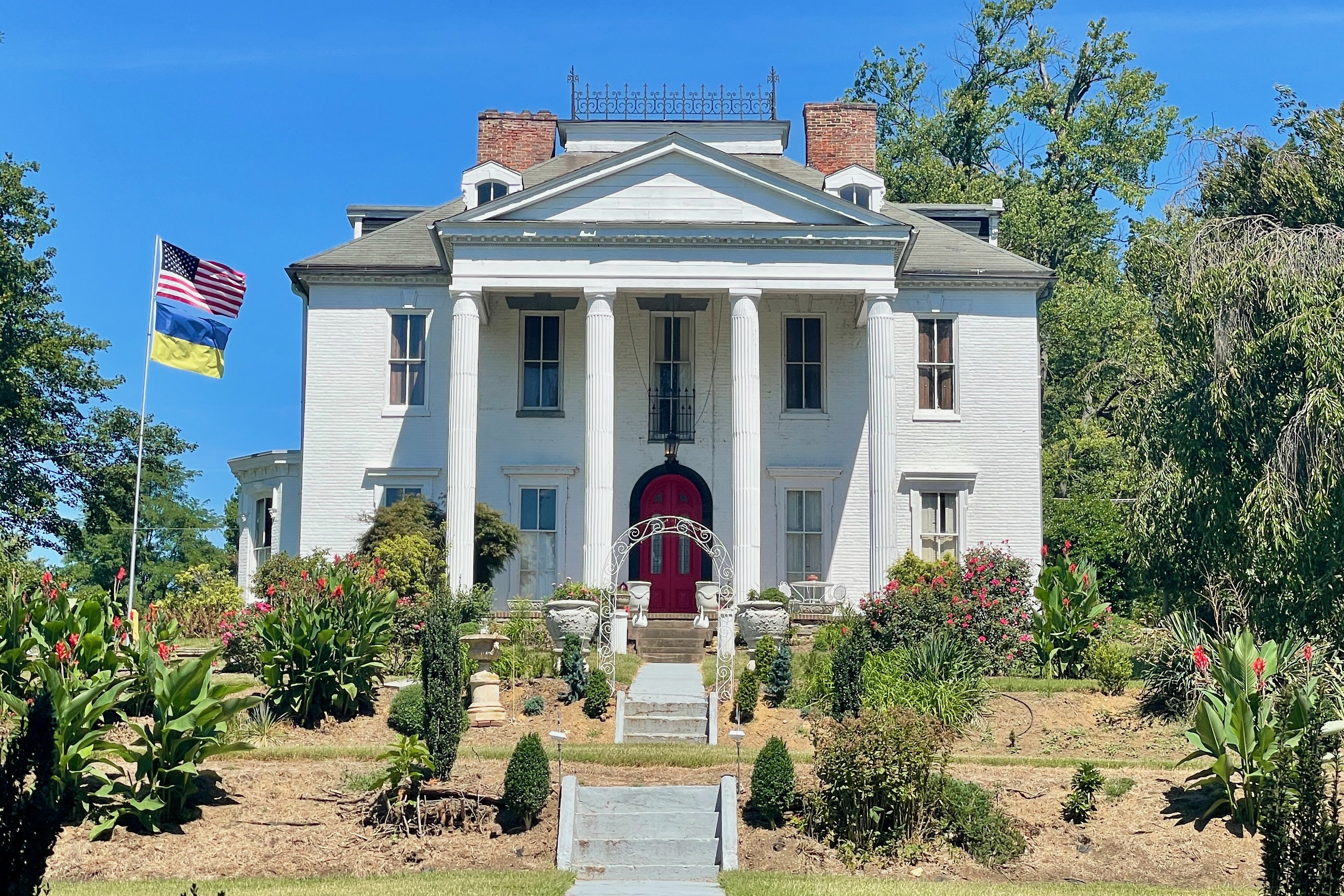
Michael Ege Mansion

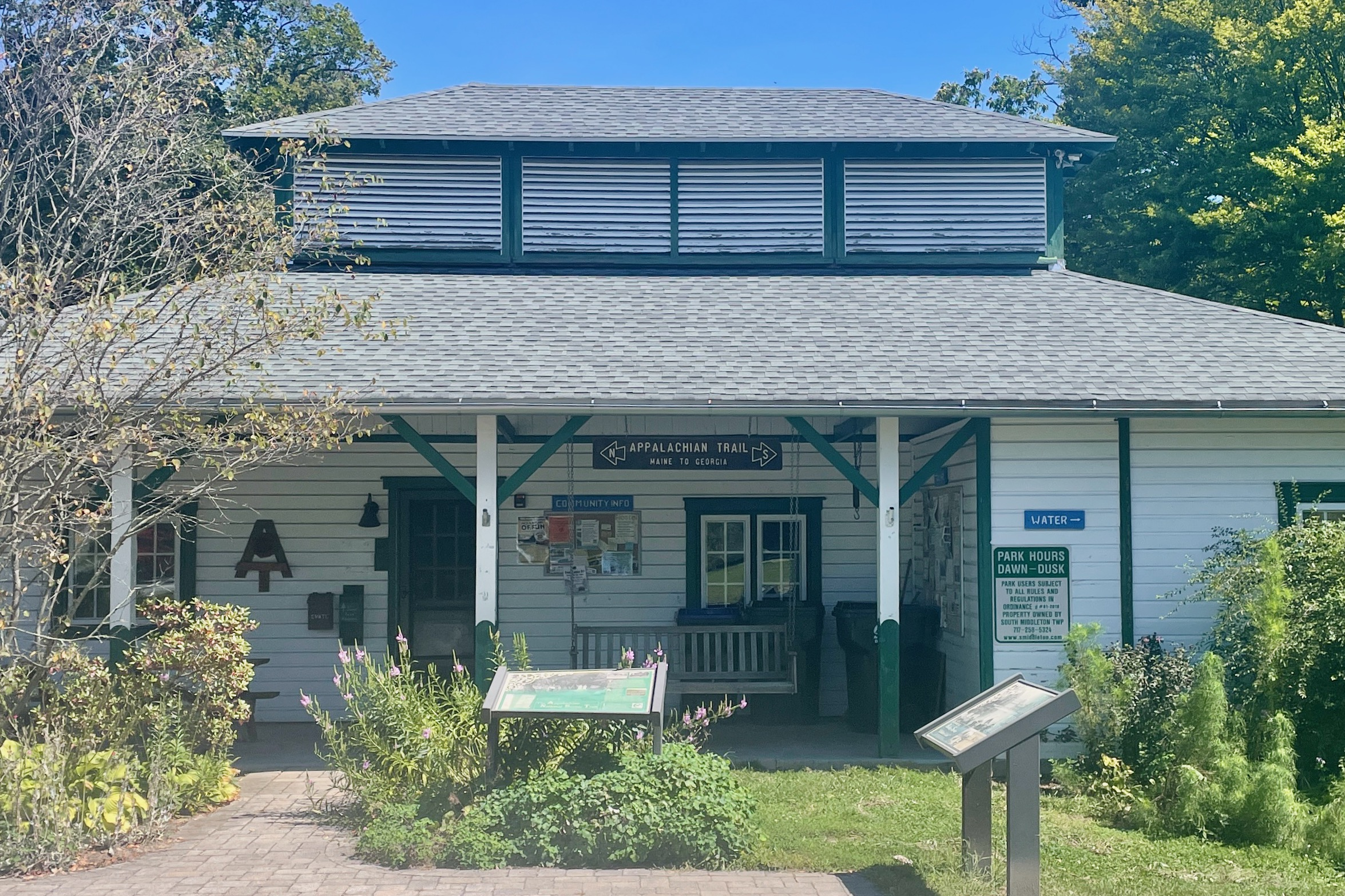
Appalachian Trail Conservancy visitor center

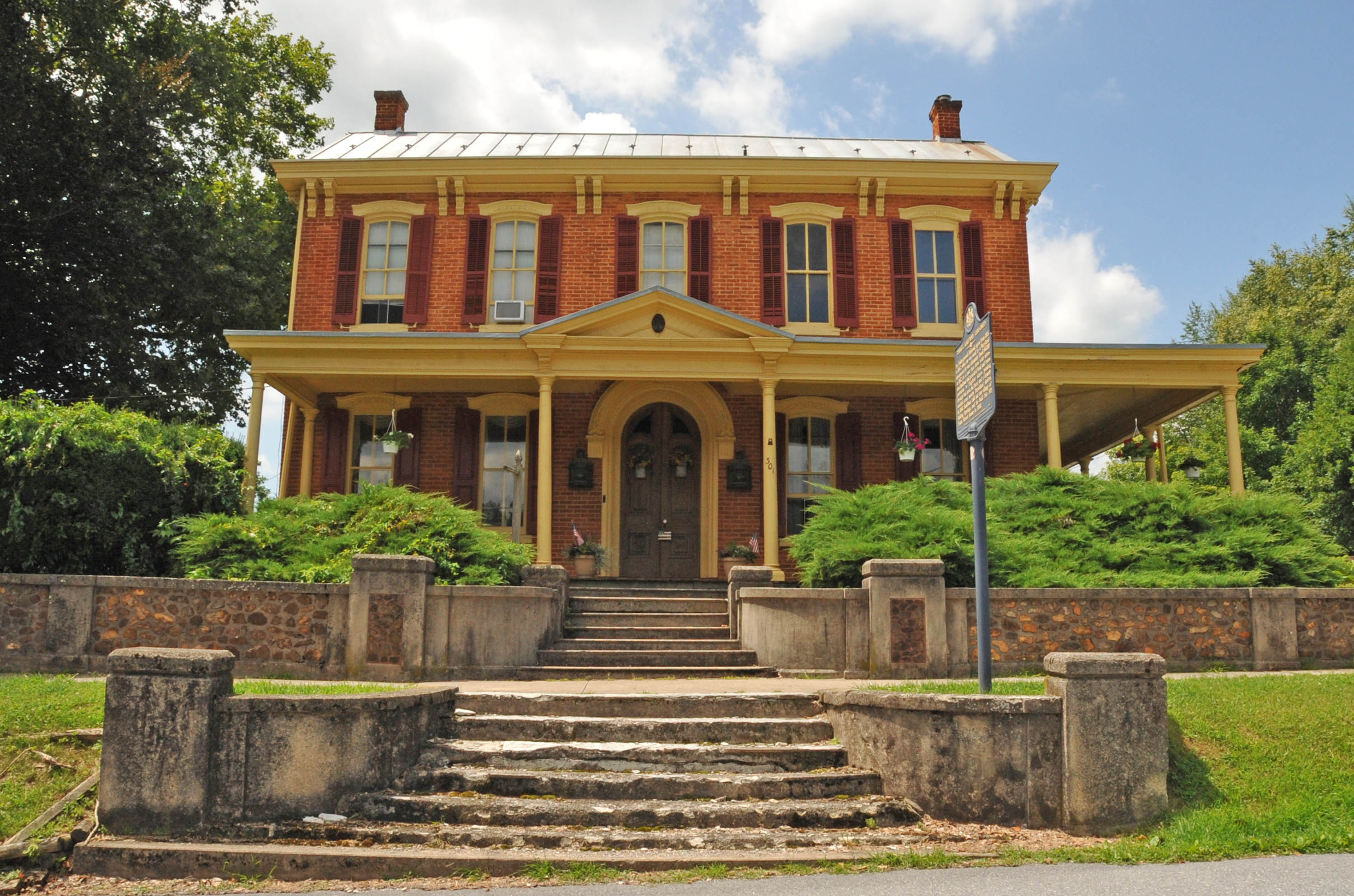
Daniel Kaufman house

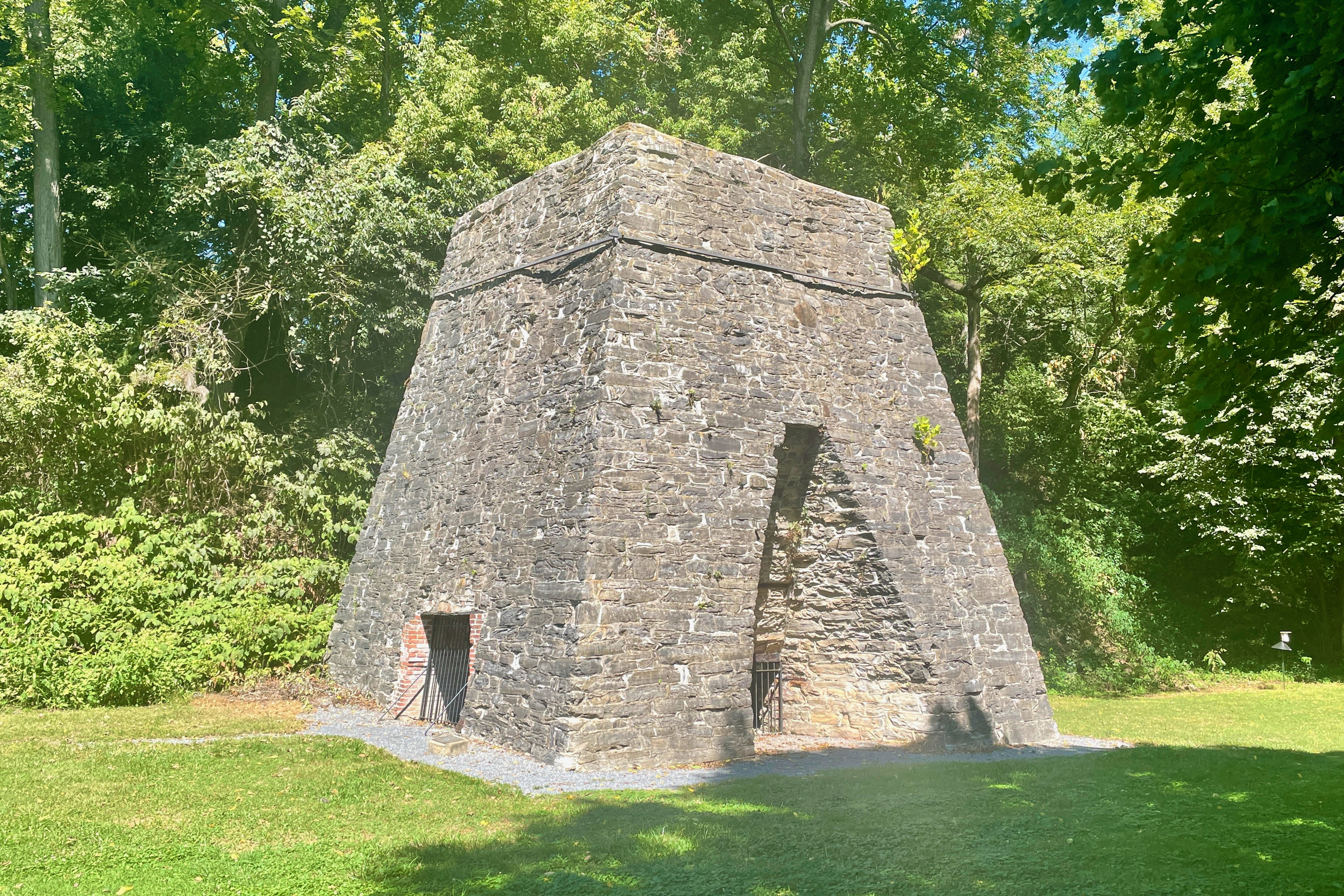
Carlisle Iron Works Furnace

== See also ==
- National Register of Historic Places listings in Cumberland County, Pennsylvania
