= Walnut Bottom, Pennsylvania =

Unincorporated community in Pennsylvania, US

- Unincorporated community
- Location within Pennsylvania
- Coordinates: 40°05′22″N 77°24′14″W
- Country: United States
- State: Pennsylvania
- County: Cumberland
- Elevation: 725 ft (221 m)
- Time zone: UTC-5 (Eastern (EST))
  - Summer (DST): UTC-4 (EDT)
- ZIP code: 17266
- Area codes: 223 & 717
- GNIS feature ID: 1190539

Walnut Bottom is an unincorporated community in Cumberland County, Pennsylvania, United States. The community is located along Pennsylvania Route 174, 6.7 miles (10.8 km) east-northeast of Shippensburg. Walnut Bottom has a post office, with ZIP code 17266, which opened on January 14, 1850.
