= Dry Run, Pennsylvania =

Unincorporated community in Pennsylvania, US

- Unincorporated community
- Location within Pennsylvania Location within the United States
- Coordinates: 40°10′3″N 77°45′14″W
- Country: United States
- State: Pennsylvania
- County: Franklin
- Township: Fannett
- Elevation: 902 ft (275 m)
- Time zone: UTC-5 (Eastern (EST))
  - Summer (DST): UTC-4 (EDT)
- ZIP code: 17220
- Area code: 717
- GNIS feature ID: 1173525

Dry Run is an unincorporated community in Fannett Township in Franklin County, Pennsylvania, United States. Dry Run is located at the intersection of Pennsylvania Route 75 and Back Road.

Dry Run was originally called Morrowstown, and under the latter name was platted in 1838, and named after the maiden name of the founder's wife. The present name is derived from nearby Dry Run creek. A post office called Dry Run has been in operation since 1825.
