= Boiling Springs, Pennsylvania =

Unincorporated community in Pennsylvania, US

- Census-designated place
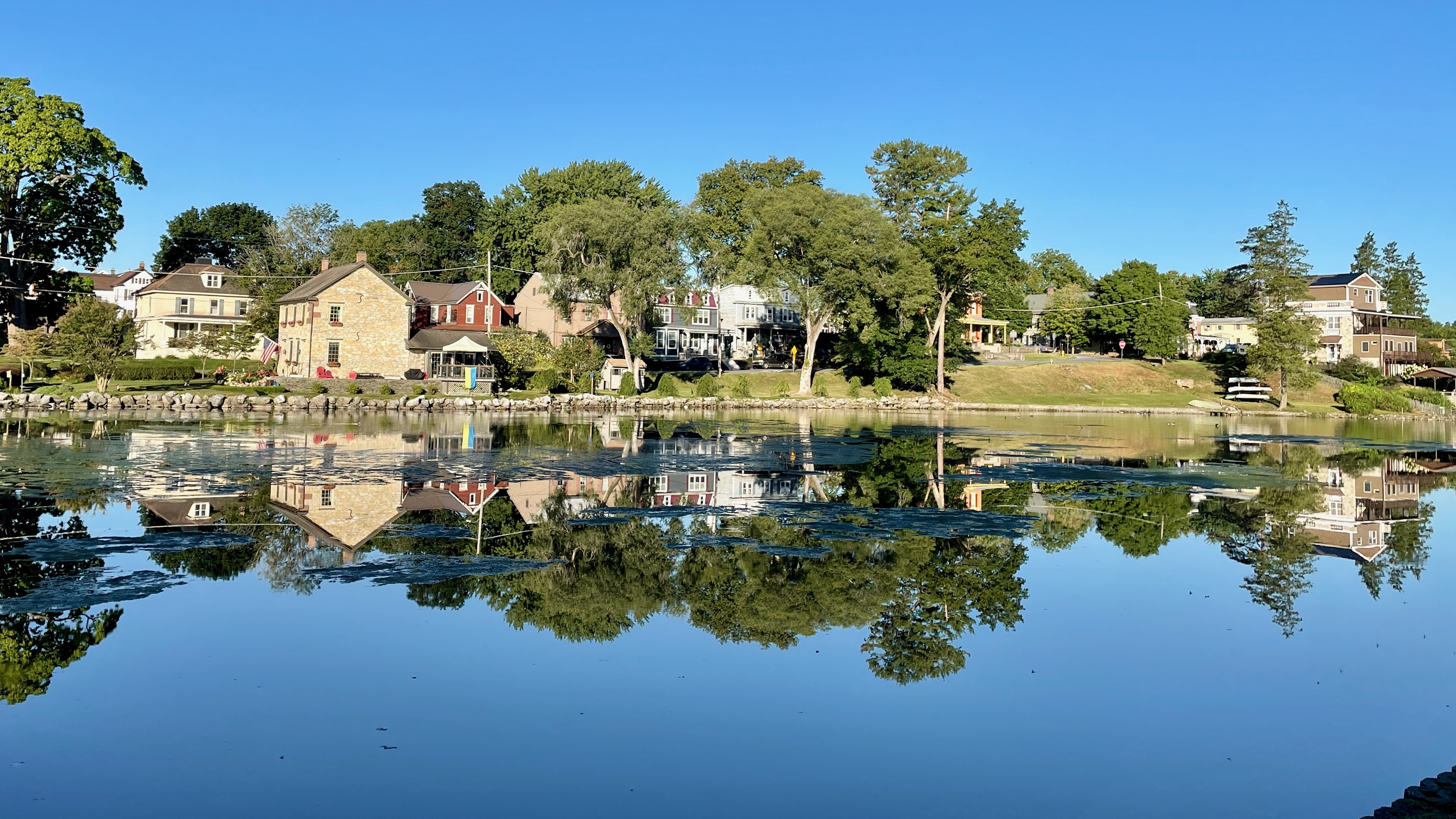
- Children's Lake, in the center of Boiling Springs
- Nicknames: Bubbletown
- Location within Pennsylvania
- Coordinates: 40°8′59″N 77°7′41″W
- Country: United States
- State: Pennsylvania
- County: Cumberland
- Township: South Middleton

Area
  - Total: 2.48 sq mi (6.43 km^{2})
  - Land: 2.47 sq mi (6.39 km^{2})
  - Water: 0.012 sq mi (0.03 km^{2})
- Elevation: 490 ft (150 m)

Population (2020)
  - Total: 3,449
  - Density: 1,397.1/sq mi (539.43/km^{2})
- Time zone: UTC-5 (Eastern (EST))
  - Summer (DST): UTC-4 (EDT)
- ZIP Code: 17007
- Area code: 717
- FIPS code: 42-07472

Boiling Springs is a census-designated place (CDP) in South Middleton Township, Cumberland County, Pennsylvania, and is part of the Harrisburg–Carlisle metropolitan statistical area. The population was 3,225 at the 2010 census, up from 2,769 at the 2000 census.

== Hydrogeology ==
Boiling Springs is located on the eastern side of South Middleton Township at 40°09′25″N 77°07′57″W, on the north side of Yellow Breeches Creek. Pennsylvania Route 174 passes through the town as 1st Street and leads 8 miles (13 km) northeast to Mechanicsburg and west 22 miles (35 km) to Shippensburg. Carlisle, the Cumberland County seat, is 6 miles (10 km) to the northwest via Front Street/Forge Road.

According to the U.S. Census Bureau, Boiling Springs has a total area of 2.48 square miles (6.43 km^{2}), of which 2.47 square miles (6.39 km^{2}) is land and 0.01 square miles (0.03 km^{2}), or 0.49%, is water.

Boiling Springs gets its name from the natural artesian well springs located in and around the town. Boiling Springs ranks seventh in size of springs in the Commonwealth of Pennsylvania. The largest of these springs named "the Bubble" is a 2nd magnitude spring based on its average discharge of around 0.7 cubic meters per second. About 22 million US gallons (83,000,000 L) of water flows per day from a total of 30 springs dotted across approximately 2 acres (8,100 m^{2}).

The impression of "boiling" does not result from the temperature of the water, which stays at 55.5–55.8 °F (13.1–13.2 °C) year-round, but rather from a unique hydrogeological feature. Two vertical diabase dikes, made up of highly impermeable igneous basalt parent rock, cut through the limestone bedrock in the area and form a subterranean "V", with Boiling Springs located at the interior tip of the V.

The dikes were formed around 200 million years ago, during the late Triassic and early Jurassic periods, when Pangaea broke apart: the same period of geological activity that formed the Palisades Sill. What is now eastern North America began to separate from what is now north-western Africa. Deep faults formed in the Earth's crust as the continental sections pulled apart. Magma was generated through decompression melting, and this molten rock pushed up to fill the faults. The cooler temperatures of the upper crust quickly solidified the hot rock, preventing it from reaching the surface. This geological process created large, thin, subvertical sheets of impermeable basalt, or diabase dikes.

When precipitation flows down South Mountain, a large amount of groundwater is produced. Much of the water, which has an acidic pH, is able to erode the valley's limestone bedrock and continue flowing at about 45 feet (14 m) below the soil. However, some of the water is trapped by the impermeable diabase dikes, which act as a hydrologic barrier. The water becomes progressively confined by the dikes as it nears the tip of the "V". Due to the positive pressure created by this confinement, water is pushed up to the surface and out of the artesian aquifer, giving the impression of "boiling" springs. The springs have a median flow of 11,500 US gallons (44,000 L) per minute. These springs, collectively known as a "spring swarm" discharge 5 to 7 times the expected infiltration given its topographic watershed. Data collected via the use of highly precise and accurate data loggers have revealed the springs hydrograph to display discharge surges, while temperature, conductivity, and turbidity remain constant. Water temperature varies seasonally by 0.3 °C but is 6 months out of phase with air temperature. A new model that has been proposed to account for these findings suggests that the excess water emanating from the springs originates from an area 60 km to the southeast on the southern side of South Mountain near the West Conewago Creek, Lat 40`04'56", long 76`43'13".

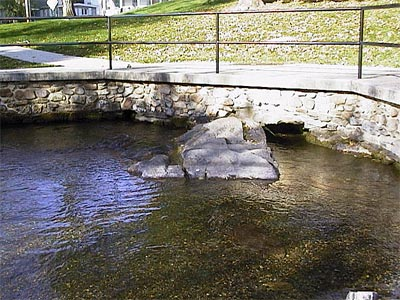
The Bubble

One of the most prominent springs in this area is called the "Bubble". It is located directly behind the Boiling Springs Tavern, at the intersection of 1st Street and Front Street. The name of the Boiling Springs High School mascot, "The Bubblers", was inspired by this spring.

== Children's Lake ==
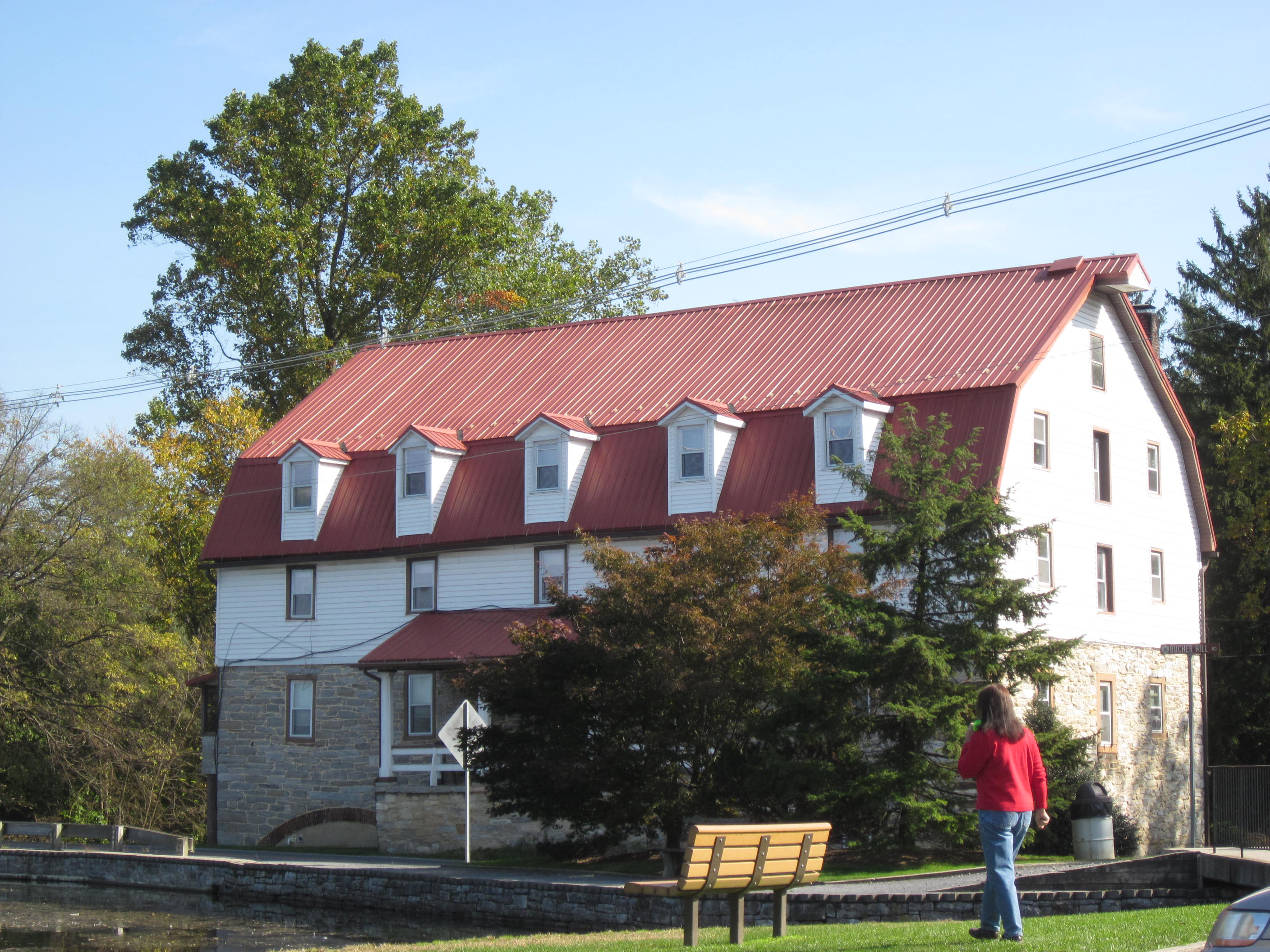
Historic grist mill in Boiling Springs

This 7-acre (2.8 ha) body of water was formed by partially damming the brook fed from 30 natural springs, including the "Bubble". Children's Lake is home to many ducks, swans, and geese throughout the year. The lake dates to the 1750s when the dam was used to provide water power for iron production. In the mid-18th century, a grist mill was built by Michael Ege on the southeast shore of the lake, to provide flour and grain for the iron works. This building has been converted into apartments. On January 29, 2022, a fire occurred and caused significant damage to the mill building. The building is slated to be converted

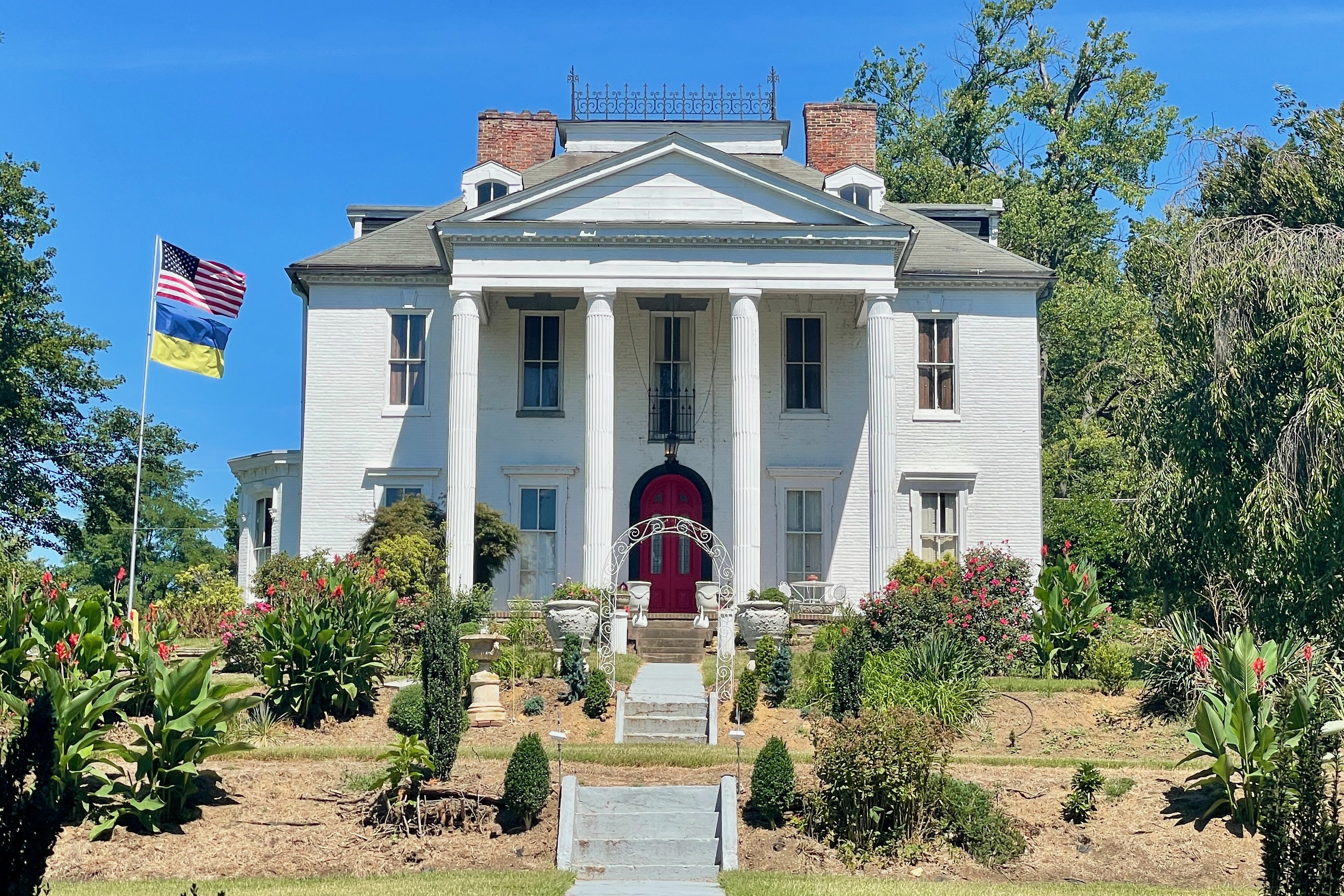
Michael Ege Mansion

On the east shore, remaining from the pre-revolutionary iron forge complex, are the original forge and the iron master's mansion with the remnants of its terraced gardens. This 1795 Georgian structure is the most outstanding example of architecture in the Boiling Springs Historic District and of major historical significance as the home of the Ege family.

The lake feeds into Yellow Breeches Creek. A picturesque, natural stone three-arch bridge, built in 1854, stands behind the mill, spanning the creek. This limestone trout stream has developed a national reputation for fly fishing. Where Children's Lake runs into the Yellow Breeches, a one-mile stretch of water known as "The Junction" provides quality catch-and-release fishing year round. This is arguably the most intensely fished section of water in Pennsylvania when the White Mayfly hatches. Limestone bedrock streams are rich in minerals, which serve as the basis for the trout's food chain and contribute to healthy growth rates for trout.

== Appalachian Trail ==
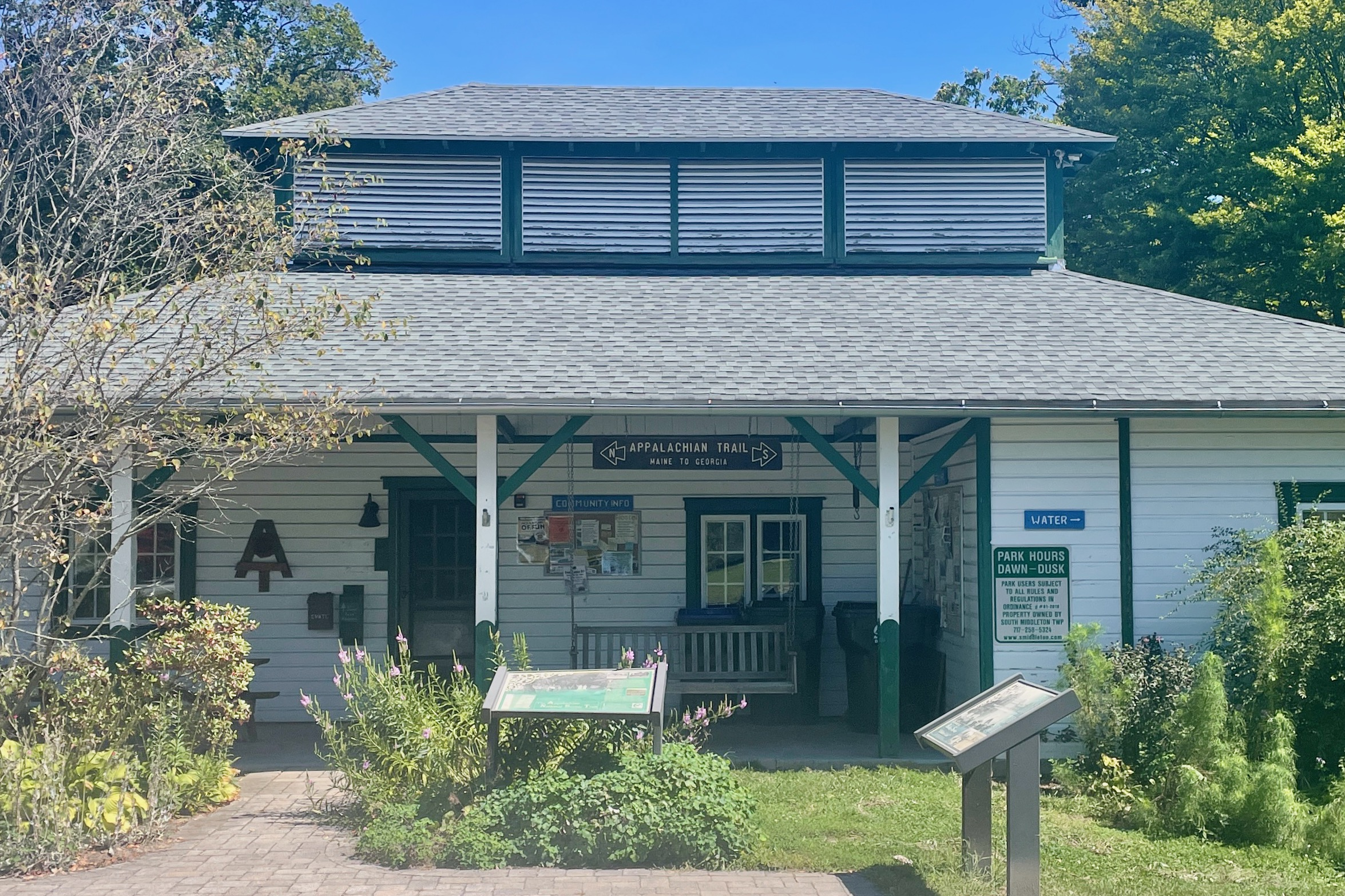
ATC visitor center

Boiling Springs and South Middleton Township, which are near the halfway point of the 2,200-mile (3,500 km) Appalachian Trail, were designated Pennsylvania's first Appalachian Trail Community. In 2010, the Appalachian Trail Conservancy started recognizing towns near the trail that are assets to hikers and the trail. As of 2012, Boiling Springs is one of 23 designated Appalachian Trail Communities. The Mid-Atlantic Regional Office of the Appalachian Trail Conservancy is located at 4 East First Street in Boiling Springs, sharing space with the Boiling Springs Appalachian Trail Information Center. As one of only four regional offices along the trail, the staff covers New York, New Jersey, Pennsylvania, Maryland, West Virginia, and Virginia south through Shenandoah National Park. It is the only Appalachian Trail Conservancy office that is located on the famous footpath itself.

Several hundred hikers pass through every week during the busy seasons. Hikers often mail themselves packages to pick up at the Boiling Springs Post Office, which is just feet from the trail. The Boiling Springs Pool offers hikers a shower for $1, and there are several bed and breakfasts, a nearby campground and even a resident who lets hikers sleep in the backyard. Nearby Allenberry Resort Inn and Playhouse rents rooms to hikers for a reasonable rate.

== History ==
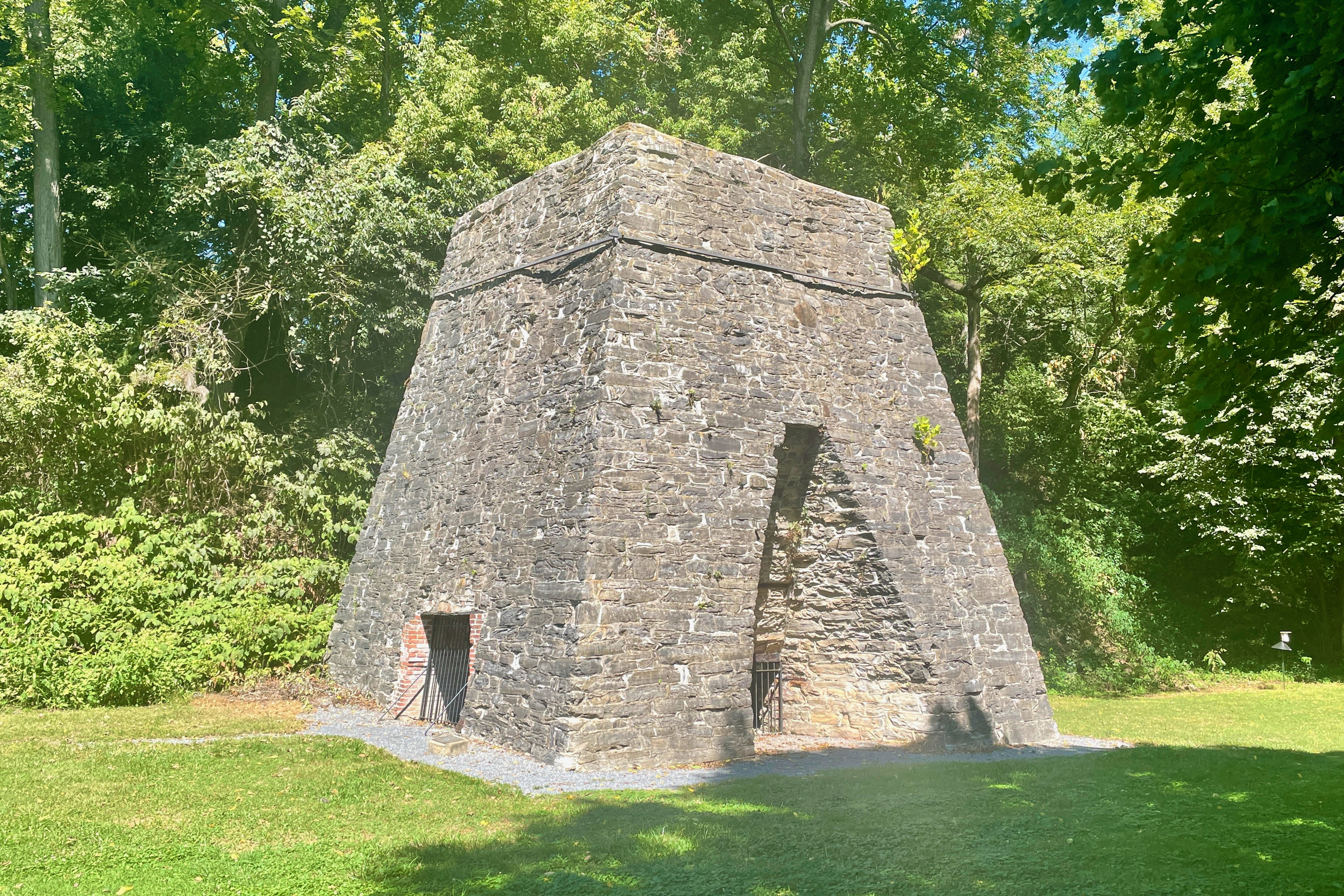
Carlisle Iron Works Furnace

Boiling Springs was settled by Europeans prior to 1737.

The springs were partially dammed in the 1750s to provide water power for iron production, with raw materials of iron ore, timber and limestone plentiful in the neighboring mountains. The Carlisle Iron Works was in full production by the 1760s, and a grist mill was built at the end of the lake in 1762. While the foundry's iron was probably used to make ammunition and weapons for the Continental Army, no cannons were made.

Daniel Kaufman, who laid out the village of Boiling Springs in 1845, purchased 48 acres (19 ha) from his father, Abraham, in 1843. He built his 301 Front Street home in 1880.

Kaufman and Boiling Springs played a role in the Underground Railroad. Kaufman was an Underground Railroad agent from 1835 to 1847. The Underground Railroad asked him to set up a necessary stopover between Shippensburg and Harrisburg. Kaufman provided food and transportation to fugitive slaves passing through the area; his barn and a densely wooded area nearby served as shelter. Kaufman was sued by a Maryland slave owner in 1847 and convicted in Cumberland County, but the verdict was overturned by the state Supreme Court. He was then charged in U.S. District Court in Philadelphia and convicted. He was ultimately fined $4,000 (~$154,800 in 2025) in 1852, in a case that drew wide attention.

Boiling Springs is now part of the Network to Freedom, a series of noteworthy sites along the Underground Railroad.

The area around the lake was a recreation spot as early as 1875 when a steam launch began to operate to carry picnickers down the mill race to Island Grove, on Yellow Breeches Creek. In 1895, trolley car lines were added running from Carlisle and Harrisburg. The Valley Traction Company leased the lake in 1900 and built a park as a destination for passengers on their trolleys. Boiling Springs became a resort community, with travelers coming to picnic and boat on the lake, with such park attractions as a dance pavilion, picnic pavilion, miniature steam railway and a merry-go-round. The trolley was operated until around 1930.

The Boiling Springs Historic District was added to the National Register of Historic Places in 1984.

Episode #13 of the second season of the classic TV series Route 66 was set in and filmed in Boiling Springs. The episode was titled "Burning for Burning" and was first aired on December 29, 1961.

== Entertainment ==
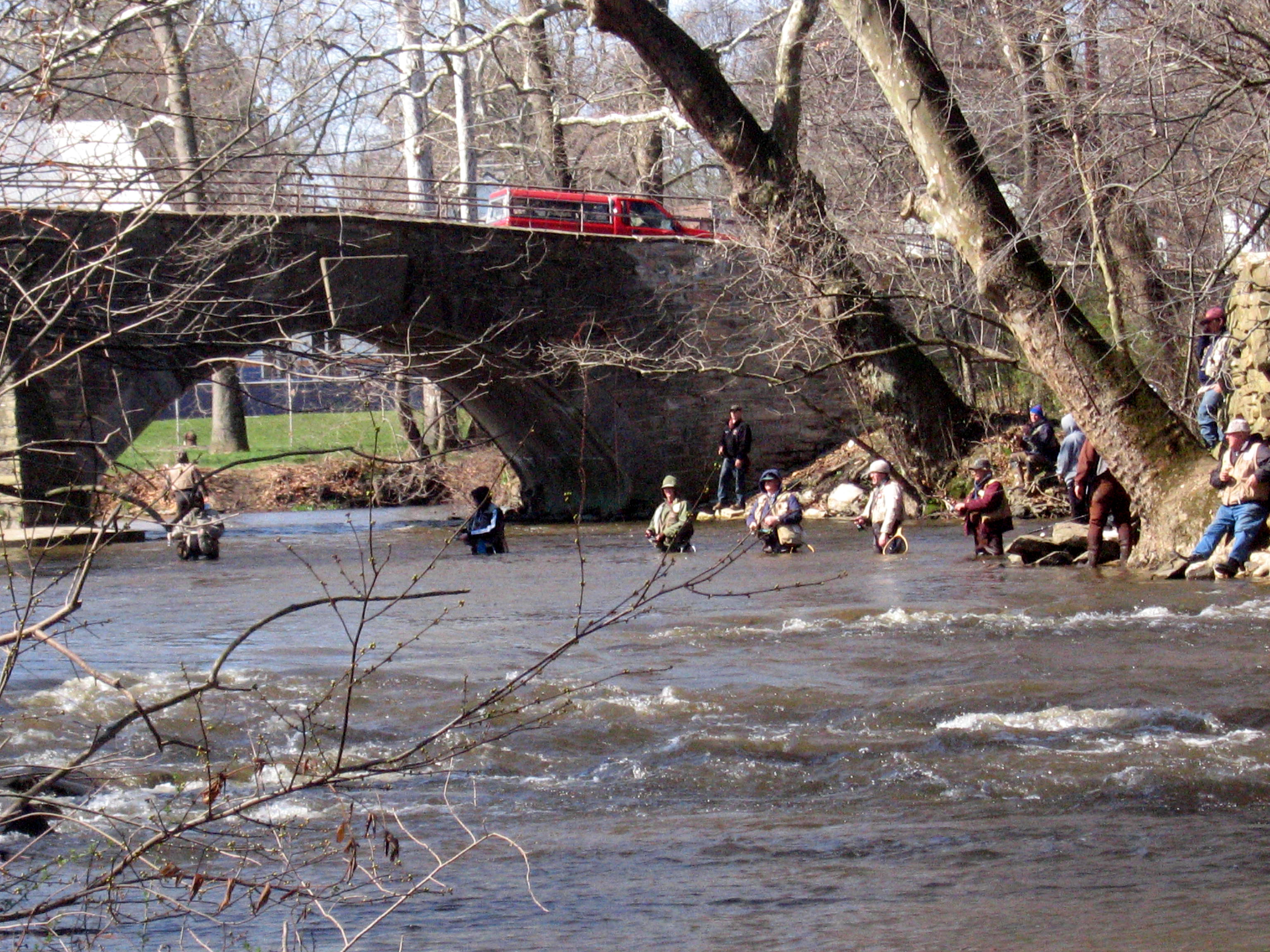
Opening day of trout season, Yellow Breeches Creek, Boiling Springs

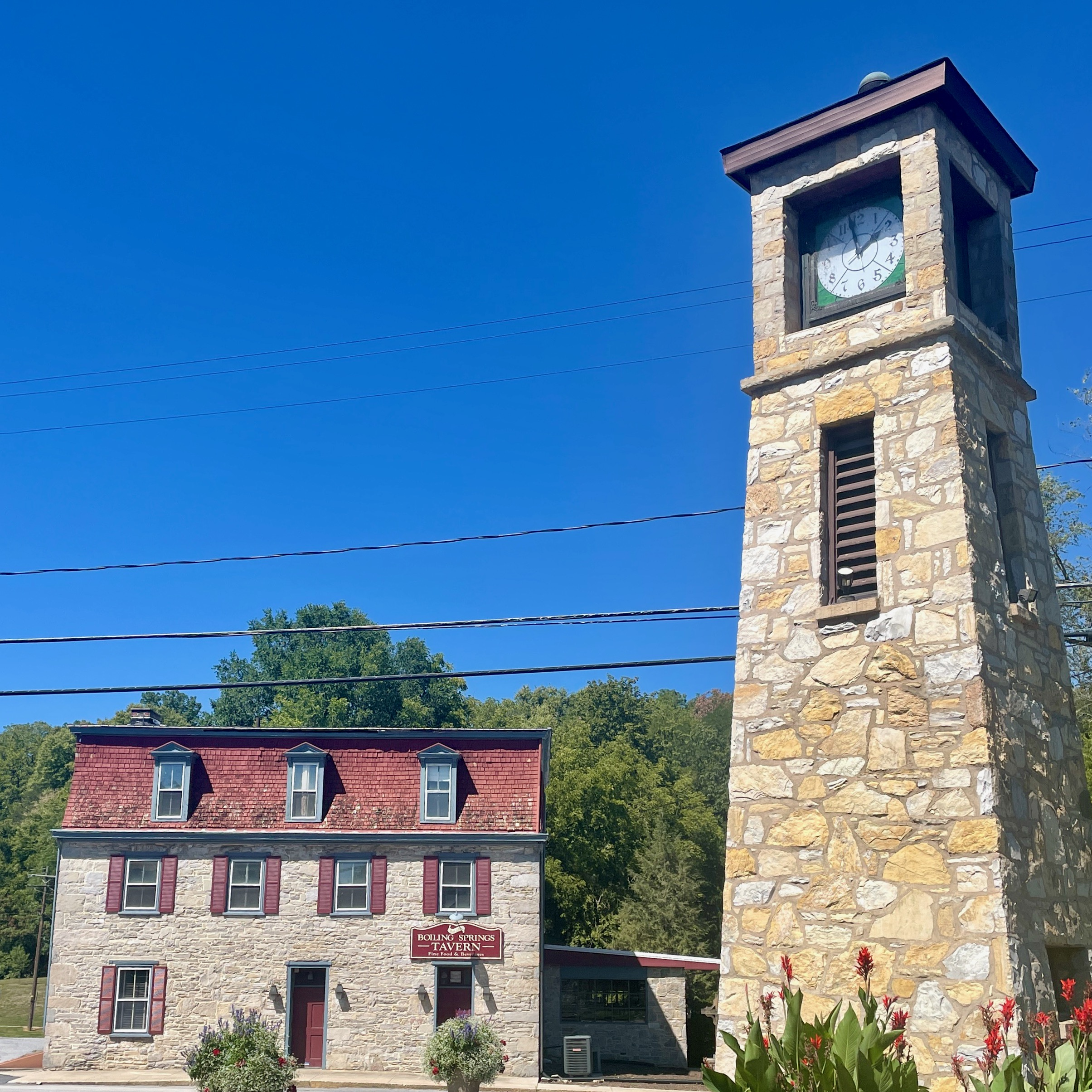
Veterans Memorial Clock Tower and Boiling Springs Tavern

Recreation continues to bring people to Boiling Springs, ranging from fly-fishing on Yellow Breeches Creek to theater, dining and lodging at Allenberry Resort, which opened in the summer of 1946. Allenberry Playhouse, whose season runs more than 40 weeks - from March to December - produced its first stage performance in 1949. The Boiling Springs Tavern, previously a restaurant in downtown Boiling Springs, was a popular dining destination. Parts of the tavern, which is located along an old stagecoach route, date to 1832. In 2020, during the pandemic, the Tavern was closed, and remains in that state.

Boiling Springs has an annual juried arts and crafts show, called Foundry Day, on the first Saturday in June. The booths and food vendors stretch down Front Street, next to Children's Lake.

The annual Carlisle Summerfair Festival's Anything Floats event is held on the 4th of July. Teams create their own vessel and then paddle the boat from one end of Children's Lake (near the Boiling Springs Tavern) to the other end (near the Grist Mill and the Boiling Springs Pool).

The Boiling Springs Pool was built in 1927 by Gilbert Malcolm, husband of Helen Bucher. It was the first public swimming facility in Cumberland County and remains open to the public. The facility offers four pools and three waterslides as well as a full-service snackbar.

== Demographics ==
=== 2020 census ===
As of the 2020 census, Boiling Springs had a population of 3,449. The median age was 45.0 years. 23.9% of residents were under the age of 18 and 20.4% of residents were 65 years of age or older. For every 100 females there were 100.1 males, and for every 100 females age 18 and over there were 95.9 males age 18 and over.

100.0% of residents lived in urban areas, while 0.0% lived in rural areas.

There were 1,330 households in Boiling Springs, of which 30.6% had children under the age of 18 living in them. Of all households, 64.0% were married-couple households, 12.4% were households with a male householder and no spouse or partner present, and 17.8% were households with a female householder and no spouse or partner present. About 16.6% of all households were made up of individuals and 9.3% had someone living alone who was 65 years of age or older.

There were 1,363 housing units, of which 2.4% were vacant. The homeowner vacancy rate was 0.8% and the rental vacancy rate was 2.3%.

Racial composition as of the 2020 census
| Race | Number | Percent |
|---|---|---|
| White | 3,154 | 91.4% |
| Black or African American | 42 | 1.2% |
| American Indian and Alaska Native | 2 | 0.1% |
| Asian | 34 | 1.0% |
| Native Hawaiian and Other Pacific Islander | 2 | 0.1% |
| Some other race | 30 | 0.9% |
| Two or more races | 185 | 5.4% |
| Hispanic or Latino (of any race) | 89 | 2.6% |

=== 2000 census ===
As of the census of 2000, there were 2,769 people, 1,035 households, and 838 families residing in the CDP. The population density was 1,108.0 inhabitants per square mile (427.8/km^{2}). There were 1,070 housing units at an average density of 428.2 per square mile (165.3/km^{2}). The racial makeup of the CDP was 97.98% White, 0.65% Black, 0.04% Native American, 0.58% Asian, 0.18% Pacific Islander, 0.07% from other races, and 0.51% from two or more races. Hispanic or Latino of any race were 0.54% of the population.

There were 1,035 households, out of which 39.7% had children under the age of 18 living with them, 68.7% were married couples living together, 9.8% had a female householder with no husband present, and 19.0% were non-families or non-traditional families. 16.2% of all households were made up of individuals, and 7.3% had someone living alone who was 65 years of age or older. The average household size was 2.67 and the average family size was 2.99.

In the CDP, the population was spread out, with 28.1% under the age of 18, 5.5% from 18 to 24, 26.4% from 25 to 44, 28.0% from 45 to 64, and 12.1% who were 65 years of age or older. The median age was 39 years. For every 100 females, there were 93.9 males. For every 100 females age 18 and over, there were 91.8 males.

The median income for a household in the CDP was $57,708, and the median income for a family was $62,154. Males had a median income of $43,594 versus $28,958 for females. The per capita income for the CDP was $23,857. About 7.1% of families and 5.9% of the population were below the poverty line, including 9.4% of those under age 18 and 10.2% of those age 65 or over.

Historical population
| Census | Pop. | Note | %± |
|---|---|---|---|
| 2000 | 2,769 | | — |
| 2010 | 3,225 | | 16.5% |
| 2020 | 3,449 | | 6.9% |

== Education ==
The school district is South Middleton School District.

== Notable people ==
- J. E. Keeny, president of Louisiana Tech University from 1908 to 1926, was reared and educated in Boiling Springs.
- Rob Moore, Canadian citizen who lived here during his teenage years, and member of the Canadian Parliament for Fundy Royal (2004–present) and current Parliamentary Secretary to the Minister of Justice and Attorney General of Canada (2006–present).
- David Spangler Kaufman, 19th-century Texas attorney, politician, and diplomat, serving in both houses of its legislature while the Republic of Texas was independent and later as U.S. Representative from Texas. He is the eponym of Kaufman County, Texas, and the county seat with the same name.
