= Amberson, Pennsylvania =

Unincorporated community in Pennsylvania, US

- Unincorporated community
- Location within Pennsylvania Location within the United States
- Coordinates: 40°10′13″N 77°40′38″W
- Country: United States
- State: Pennsylvania
- County: Franklin
- Township: Fannett
- Elevation: 948 ft (289 m)
- Time zone: UTC-5 (Eastern (EST))
  - Summer (DST): UTC-4 (EDT)
- ZIP code: 17210
- Area code: 717
- GNIS feature ID: 1168249

Amberson is an unincorporated community in Fannett Township in Franklin County, Pennsylvania, United States.

== Geography ==
Amberson is located along Amberson Road in a narrow valley to the northwest of Roxbury.

== History ==
Fannett Township was incorporated as part of Cumberland County in 1761, and Francis Amberson settled in the valley in 1763. Evidence points to there having been settlers in Amberson prior to Francis, however. Fannett Township was included in the new Franklin County when it was incorporated in 1784.
