= Fannett Township, Pennsylvania =

Township in Pennsylvania, US

Coordinates: 40°13′00″N 77°36′59″W

Fannett Township, Franklin County, Pennsylvania
- Township
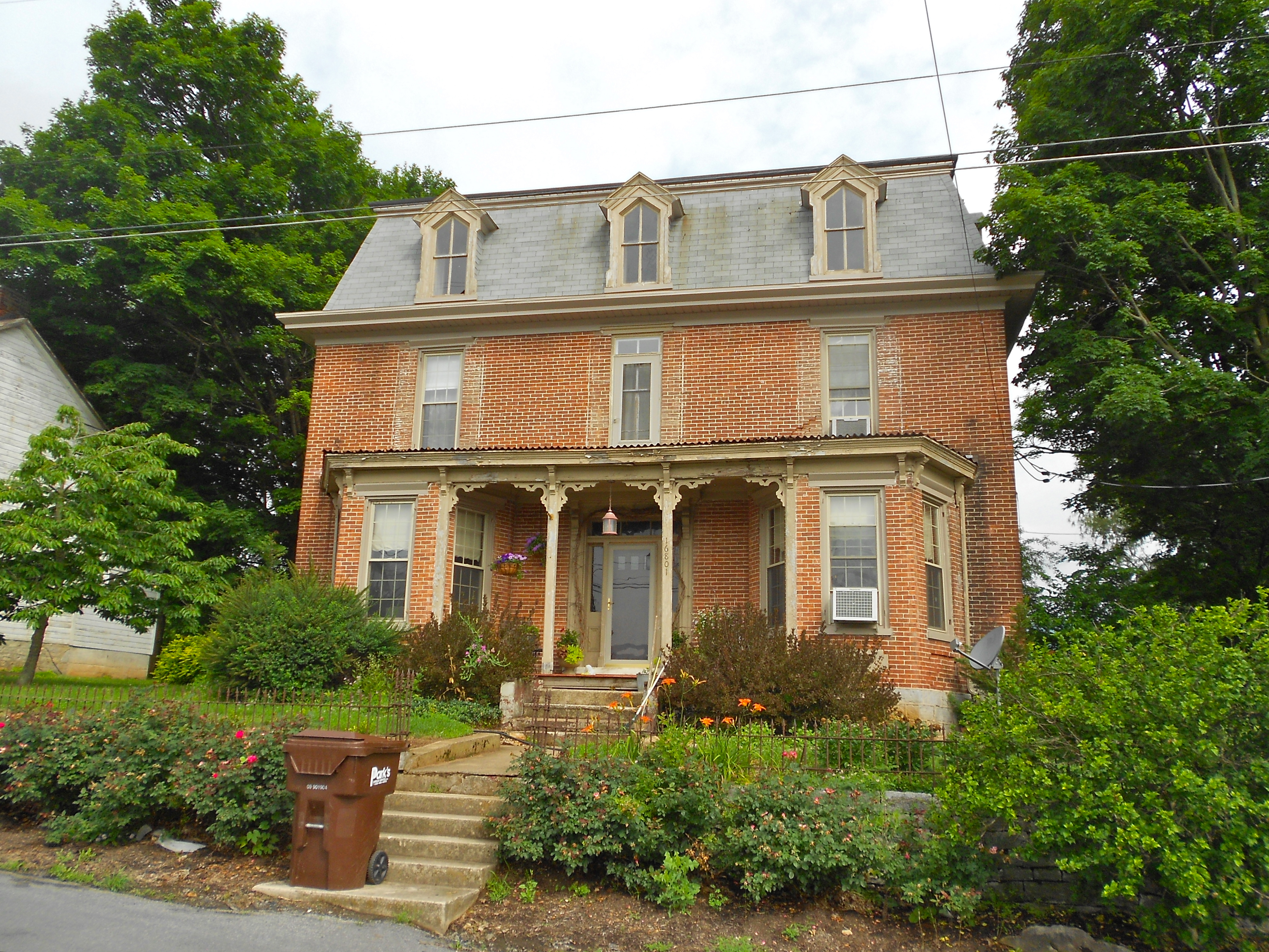
- House in Spring Run

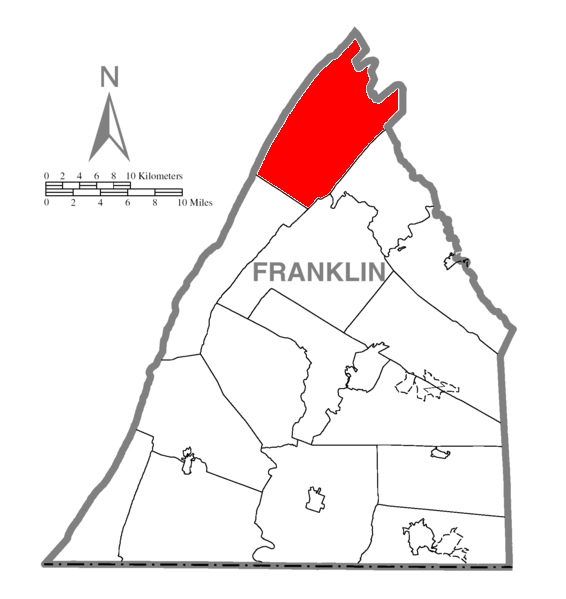
- Map of Franklin County, Pennsylvania highlighting Fannett Township

- Map of Franklin County, Pennsylvania
- Country: United States
- State: Pennsylvania
- County: Franklin
- Incorporated: 1761

Area
  - Total: 68.21 sq mi (176.67 km^{2})
  - Land: 68.20 sq mi (176.63 km^{2})
  - Water: 0.015 sq mi (0.04 km^{2})

Population (2020)
  - Total: 2,483
  - Estimate (2016): 2,598
  - Density: 38.1/sq mi (14.71/km^{2})
- Time zone: UTC-5 (Eastern (EST))
  - Summer (DST): UTC-4 (EDT)
- Area code: 717
- FIPS code: 42-055-25176

Fannett Township is a township in Franklin County, Pennsylvania, United States. The population was 2,483 at the 2020 census. The township derives its name as an older variant spelling of Fanad, County Donegal, from early Irish settlement in the area. It was formed before 1762, and until about 1795 included the area now in Metal Township.

== Geography ==
Fannett Township is the northernmost township in Franklin County. It is bordered to the west by Huntingdon County, to the north by Juniata County, to the northeast by Perry County, and to the east by Cumberland County. The township is in the Ridge and Valley Province of the Appalachian Mountains: Tuscarora Mountain forms the western boundary of the township, and the eastern boundary follows the crest of Kittatinny Mountain (known as Sherman Mountain to the northeast).

According to the United States Census Bureau, the township has a total area of 68.2 square miles (176.7 km^{2}), of which 0.02 square miles (0.04 km^{2}), or 0.02%, is water.

Interstate 76, the Pennsylvania Turnpike, crosses the southeastern part of the township, but with no direct access. The turnpike enters the township from the east via the Kittatinny Mountain Tunnel.

Unincorporated communities in the township include Spring Run in the southwest, Dry Run in the west-central area, Doylesburg in the center, and Concord in the north, all along Pennsylvania Route 75. Amberson is in the eastern part of the township, in the Amberson Valley between Rising Mountain to the northwest and Kittatinny Mountain to the southeast. The southern half of the township is drained by the West Branch of Conococheague Creek, a tributary of the Potomac River, while the northern half is drained by the Narrows Branch of Tuscarora Creek, a tributary of the Juniata River and part of the Susquehanna River watershed.

=== Neighboring Townships ===
- Dublin Township (Huntingdon County), (west)
- Hopewell Township (Cumberland County), (east)
- Lack Township (Juniata County), (north)
- Letterkenny Township (south)
- Lurgan Township (southeast)
- Metal Township (southwest)
- Tell Township (Huntingdon County), (northwest)
- Toboyne Township (Perry County), (northeast)

== Communities ==
- Amberson
- Concord
- Doylesburg
- Doylestown
- Dry Run
- Laurel Grove
- Newbridge
- Spring Run

== Demographics ==
Historical population
| Census | Pop. | Note | %± |
|---|---|---|---|
| 2000 | 2,370 | | — |
| 2010 | 2,548 | | 7.5% |
| 2020 | 2,483 | | −2.6% |
| 2016 (est.) | 2,598 | | 2.0% |
U.S. Decennial Census

As of the census of 2000, there were 2,370 people, 824 households, and 619 families residing in the township. The population density was 34.6 inhabitants per square mile (13.4/km^{2}). There were 1,045 housing units at an average density of 15.3/sq mi (5.9/km^{2}). The racial makeup of the township was 98.73% White, 0.68% African American, 0.17% Asian, 0.30% from other races, and 0.13% from two or more races. Hispanic or Latino of any race were 0.42% of the population.

There were 824 households, out of which 34.5% had children under the age of 18 living with them, 65.5% were married couples living together, 6.3% had a female householder with no husband present, and 24.8% were non-families. 21.8% of all households were made up of individuals, and 10.0% had someone living alone who was 65 years of age or older. The average household size was 2.82 and the average family size was 3.27.

In the township the population was spread out, with 29.7% under the age of 18, 8.4% from 18 to 24, 26.7% from 25 to 44, 22.5% from 45 to 64, and 12.6% who were 65 years of age or older. The median age was 34 years. For every 100 females, there were 96.2 males. For every 100 females age 18 and over, there were 99.2 males.

The median income for a household in the township was $35,179, and the median income for a family was $38,250. Males had a median income of $27,309 versus $21,452 for females. The per capita income for the township was $14,915. About 12.7% of families and 20.3% of the population were below the poverty line, including 31.4% of those under age 18 and 8.6% of those age 65 or over.

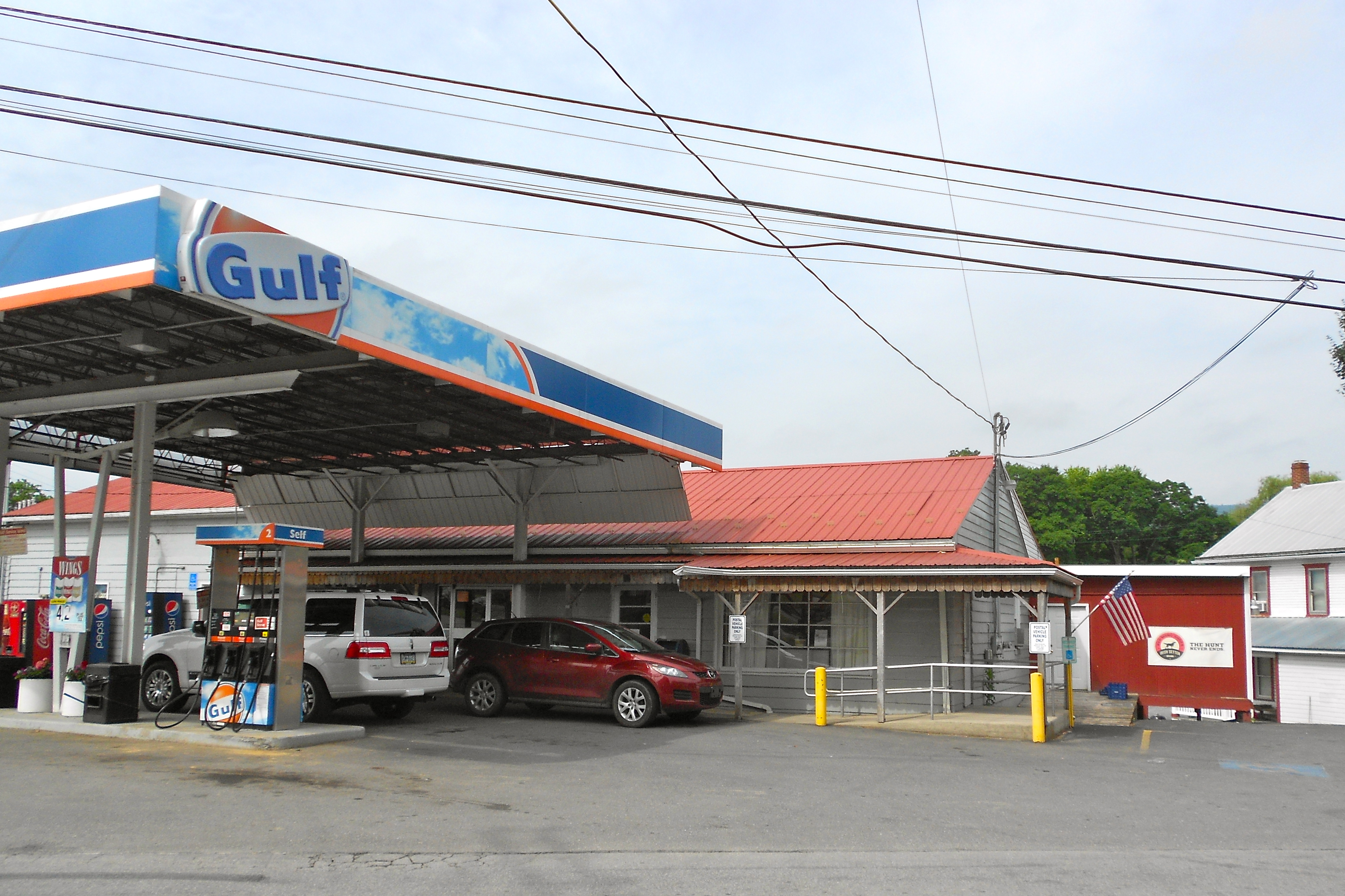
Post office (right) and gas station in Spring Run

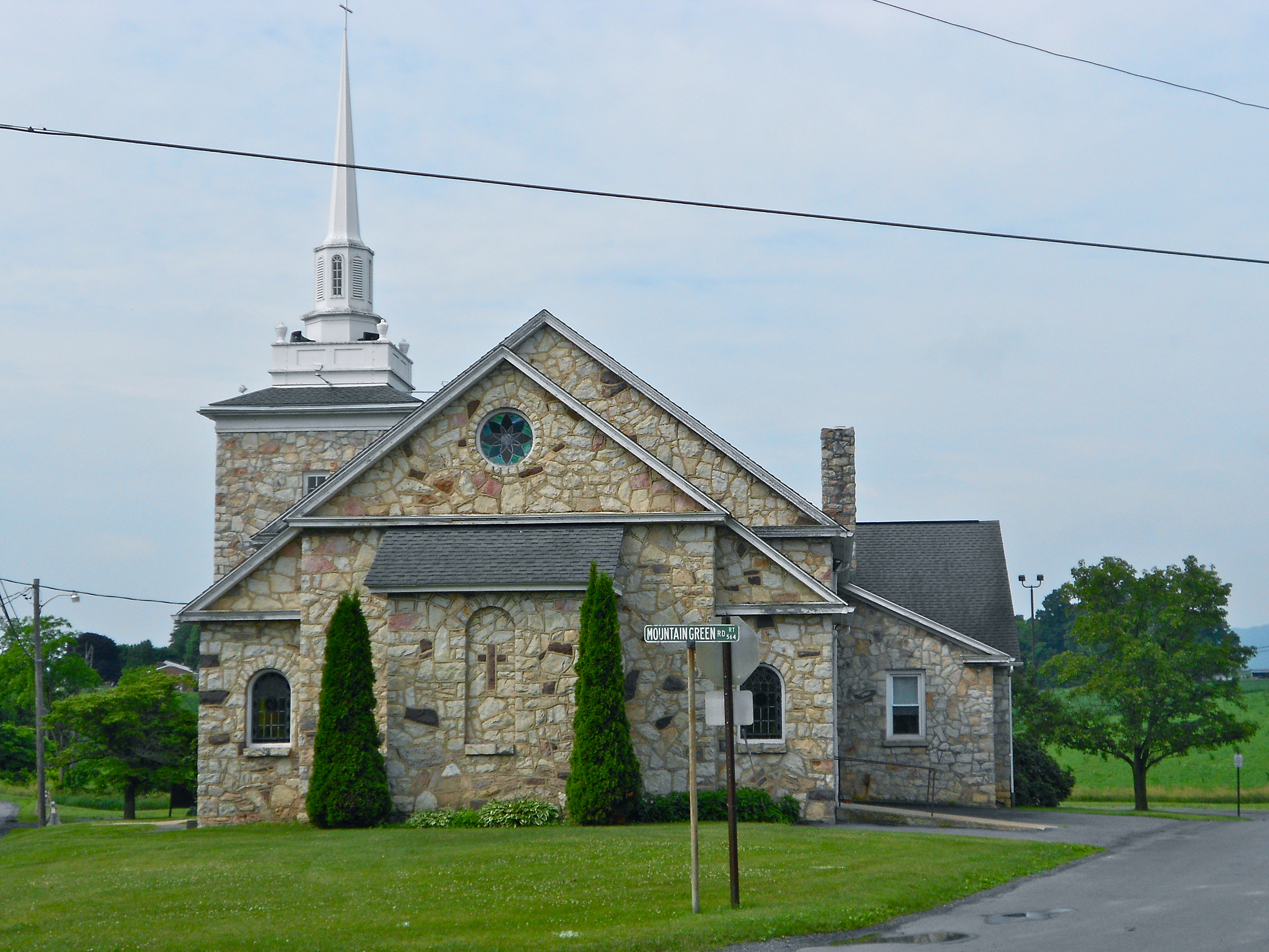
United Methodist Church

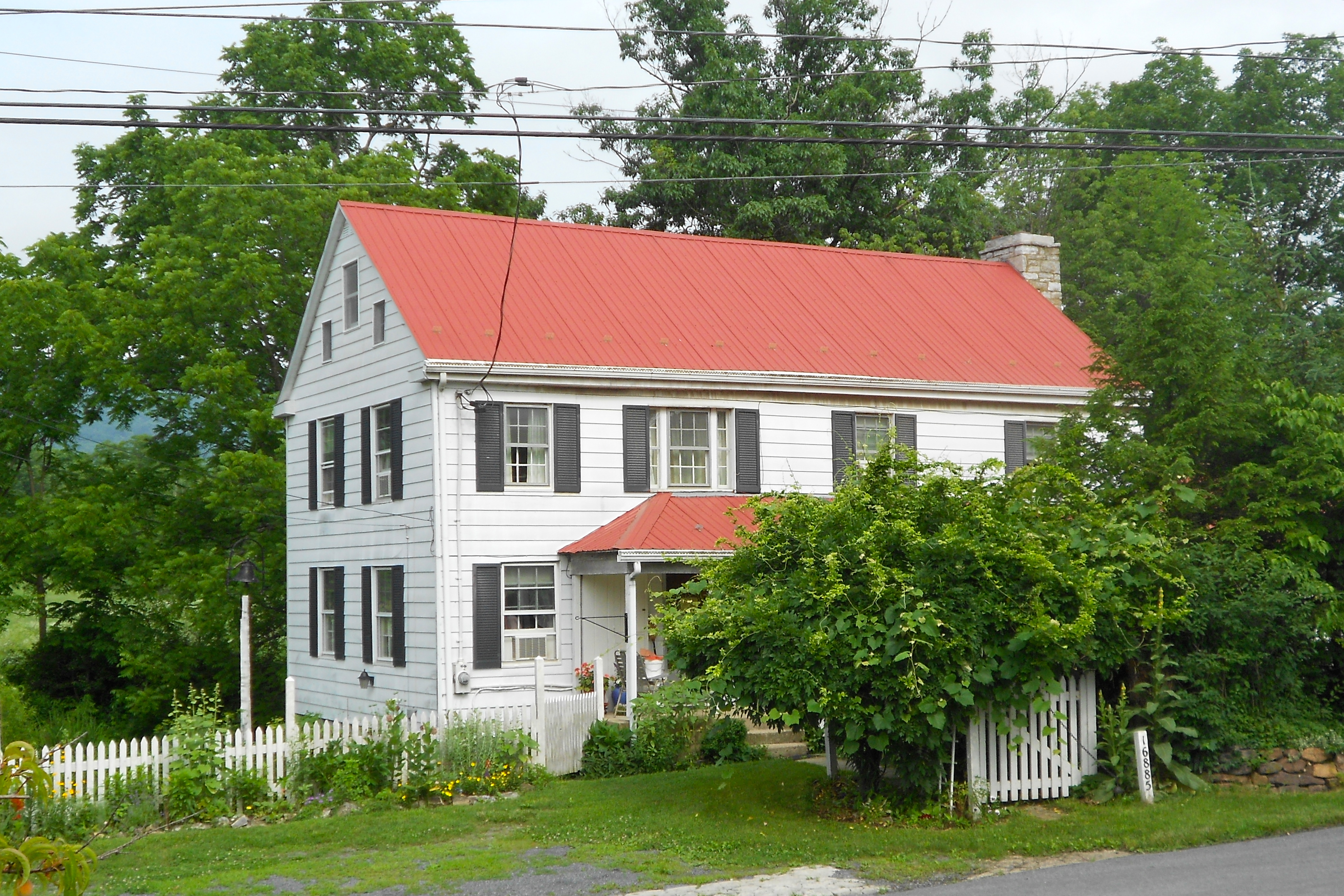
House in Spring Run
