= Monroe Township, Cumberland County, Pennsylvania =

Township in Pennsylvania, US

Coordinates: 40°07′00″N 77°04′59″W

- Township
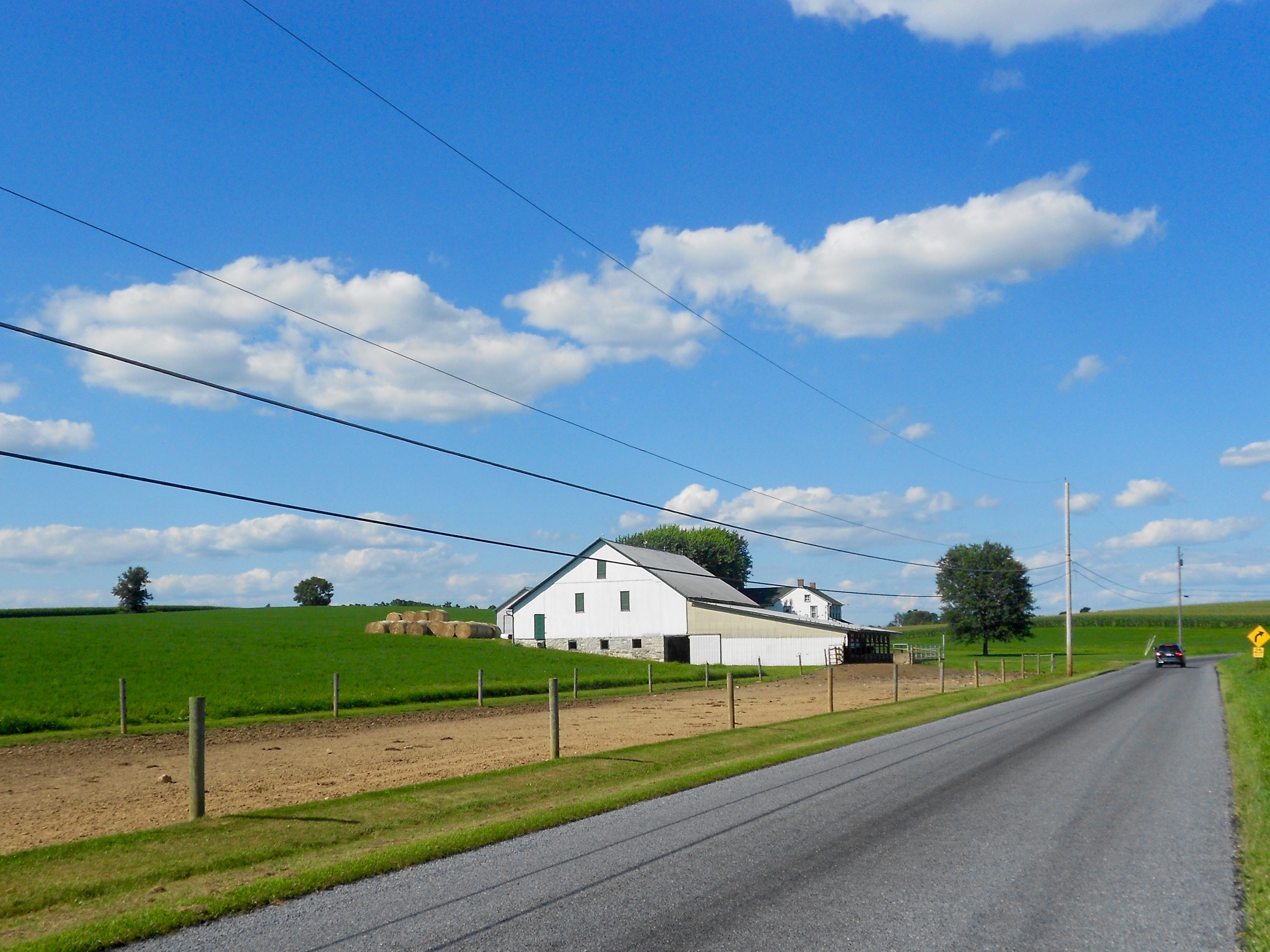
- Farm in Monroe Township

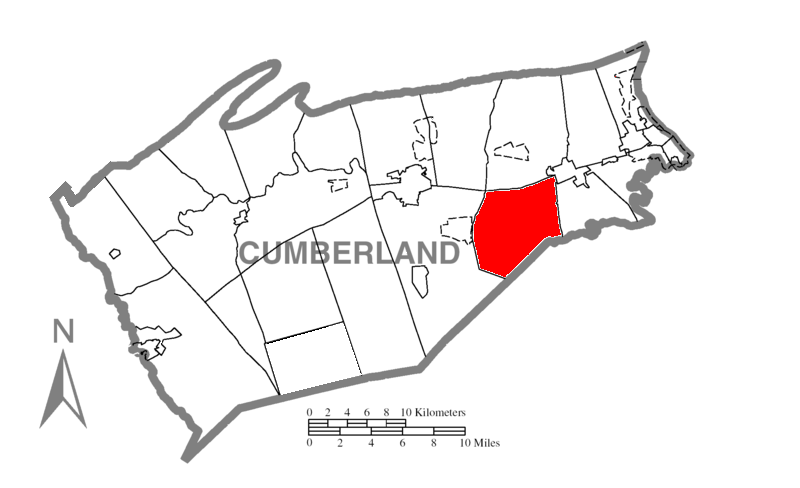
- Map of Cumberland County, Pennsylvania highlighting Monroe Township

- Map of Cumberland County, Pennsylvania
- Country: United States
- State: Pennsylvania
- County: Cumberland

Government
  - Type: Board of Supervisors

Area
  - Total: 26.30 sq mi (68.12 km^{2})
  - Land: 26.09 sq mi (67.57 km^{2})
  - Water: 0.21 sq mi (0.55 km^{2})

Population (2010)
  - Total: 5,823
  - Estimate (2016): 6,113
  - Density: 234.3/sq mi (90.47/km^{2})
- Time zone: UTC-5 (Eastern (EST))
  - Summer (DST): UTC-4 (EDT)
- Area code: 717
- FIPS code: 42-041-50472
- Website: monroetwp.net

Historical population
Census	Pop.	Note	%±
2000	5,530		—
2010	5,823		5.3%
2016 (est.)	6,113		5.0%
U.S. Decennial Census

Monroe Township is a township in Cumberland County, Pennsylvania, United States. The population was 5,823 at the 2010 census.

== Geography ==
The township is in eastern Cumberland County and is bordered to the south by York County. Most of the township is in the Cumberland Valley area of Pennsylvania, but the southern end of the township contains the northeastern end of South Mountain. Yellow Breeches Creek, a tributary of the Susquehanna River, crosses the township just north of South Mountain.

Unincorporated communities in the township include Churchtown, Brandtsville, and Williams Grove. According to the United States Census Bureau, the township has a total area of 26.3 square miles (68.1 km^{2}), of which 26.1 square miles (67.6 km^{2}) is land and 0.2 square miles (0.6 km^{2}), or 0.81%, is water.

== Demographics ==
At the 2000 census there were 5,530 people, 2,073 households, and 1,652 families in the township. The population density was 211.5 inhabitants per square mile (81.7/km^{2}). There were 2,165 housing units at an average density of 82.8 units per square mile (32.0 units/km^{2}). The racial makeup of the township was 98.59% White, 0.22% African American, 0.04% Native American, 0.56% Asian, 0.02% Pacific Islander, 0.02% from other races, and 0.56% from two or more races. Hispanic or Latino of any race were 0.47%.

There were 2,073 households, 34.3% had children under the age of 18 living with them, 71.2% were married couples living together, 5.5% had a female householder with no husband present, and 20.3% were non-families. 16.4% of households were made up of individuals, and 5.6% were one person aged 65 or older. The average household size was 2.67 and the average family size was 2.99.

In the township the population was spread out, with 24.5% under the age of 18, 6.2% from 18 to 24, 28.1% from 25 to 44, 30.0% from 45 to 64, and 11.2% 65 or older. The median age was 40 years. For every 100 females, there were 101.1 males. For every 100 females age 18 and over, there were 99.8 males.

The median household income was $57,351 and the median family income was $62,599. Males had a median income of $42,857 versus $32,067 for females. The per capita income for the township was $23,963. About 3.5% of families and 5.4% of the population were below the poverty line, including 4.3% of those under age 18 and 12.7% of those age 65 or over.
