= Five Forks =

Five Forks may refer to:

- The Battle of Five Forks, a battle of the American Civil War in Dinwiddie County, Virginia

== Places ==
=== United States ===
- Five Forks, Gwinnett County, Georgia, an unincorporated community
- Five Forks, North Carolina (disambiguation), multiple places
- Five Forks, Franklin County, Pennsylvania, an unincorporated community
- Five Forks, Greenville County, South Carolina, a census-designated place
- Five Forks, Virginia (disambiguation), multiple places
- Five Forks, West Virginia (disambiguation), multiple places
