= Meeting of the Pines Natural Area =

Natural area in Pennsylvania

- Location within Pennsylvania
- Location: Franklin County, Pennsylvania
- Nearest town: Mont Alto
- Coordinates: 39°50′19″N 77°31′55″W
- Area: 611 acres (247 ha)
- Established: 1974

Meeting of the Pines Natural Area is a 611-acre (247 ha) protected area in Franklin County, Pennsylvania, United States. It is part of Michaux State Forest.

== Description ==
The Natural Area was established in 1974 to preserve a forest grove containing five of the six species of pine tree that are native to Pennsylvania, and to allow natural forest propagation processes. The area includes some of the few specimens of shortleaf pine to be found in the northeastern United States.

Meeting of the Pines Natural Area is adjacent to the Penn State Mont Alto campus, and across PA 233 from Mont Alto State Park. The area is frequently the site of forestry research by the university.
