= Quincy Township, Pennsylvania =

Township in Pennsylvania, US

Coordinates: 39°49′00″N 77°28′59″W

Quincy Township, Franklin County, Pennsylvania
- Township
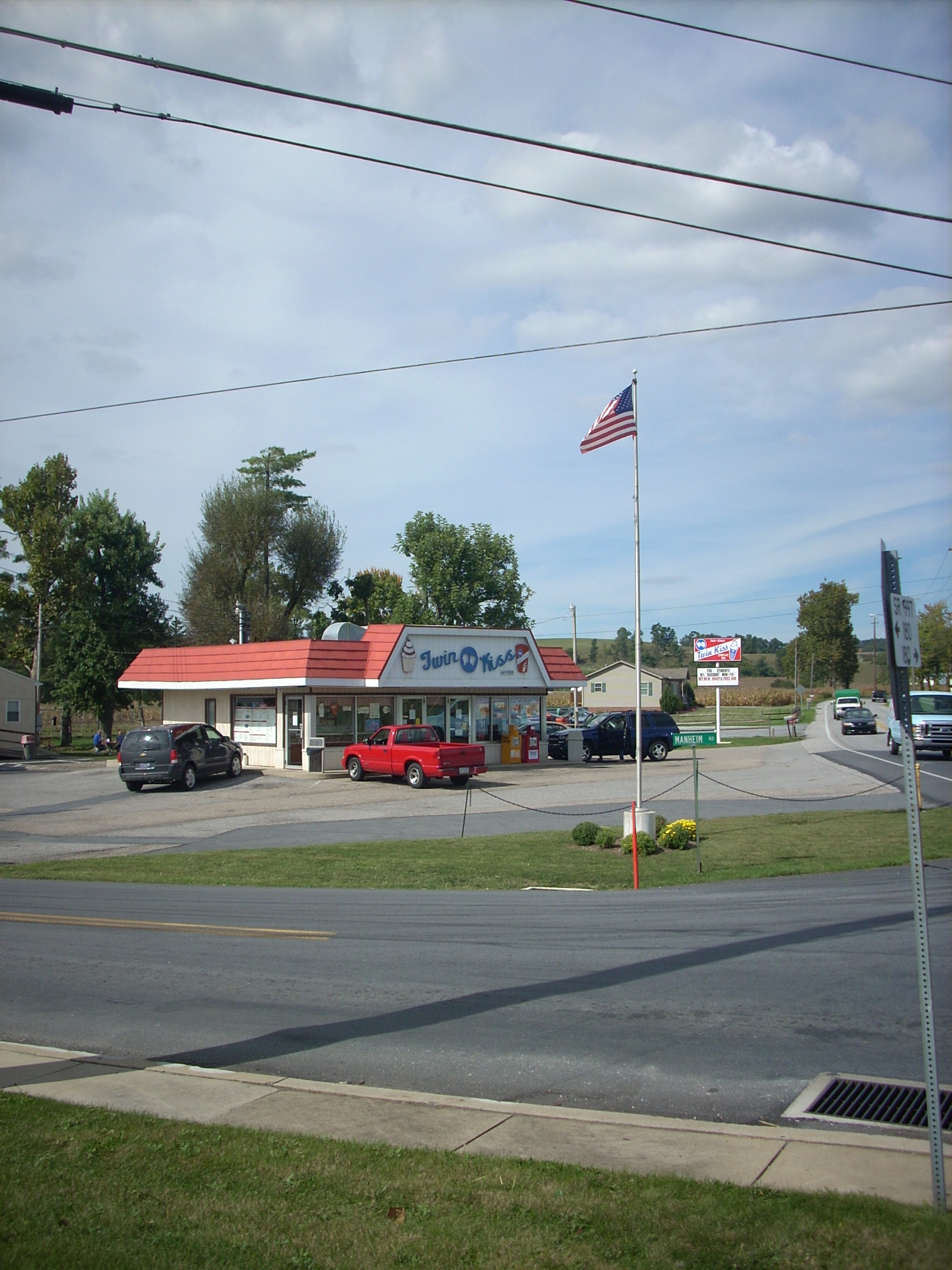
- The Twin Kiss in Quincy Township

- Flag Seal

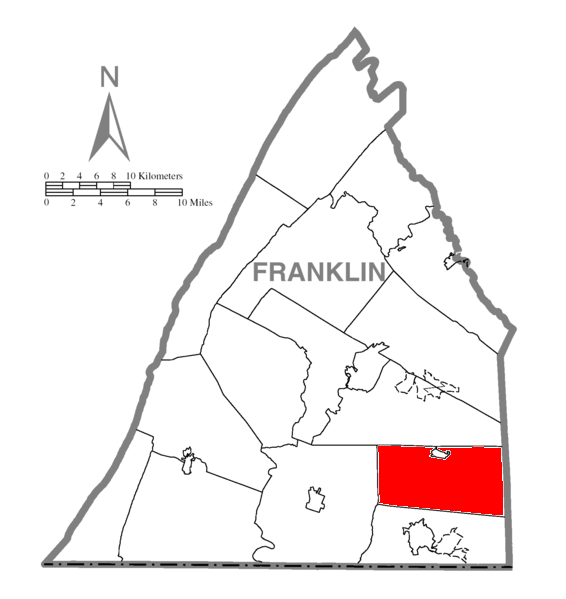
- Map of Franklin County, Pennsylvania highlighting Quincy Township

- Map of Franklin County, Pennsylvania
- Country: United States
- State: Pennsylvania
- County: Franklin
- Settled: 1733
- Incorporated: 1838

Area
  - Total: 45.21 sq mi (117.10 km^{2})
  - Land: 45.20 sq mi (117.08 km^{2})
  - Water: 0.0077 sq mi (0.02 km^{2})

Population (2020)
  - Total: 5,318
  - Estimate (2016): 5,494
  - Density: 121.5/sq mi (46.92/km^{2})
- Time zone: UTC-5 (Eastern (EST))
  - Summer (DST): UTC-4 (EDT)
- Area code: 717
- FIPS code: 42-055-63200
- Website: www.quincytwp.org

Quincy Township is a township that is located in Franklin County, Pennsylvania. The population was 5,318 at the time of the 2020 census, a decline from the figure of 5,541 that was tabulated during the 2010 census.

== History ==
The township was named after John Quincy Adams, sixth President of the United States.

== Geography ==
The township is located in southeastern Franklin County and is bordered to the east by Adams County. The western half of the township is part of the Great Appalachian Valley, an agricultural area with elevations in the township ranging from 650 to 1,100 feet (200 to 340 m), while the eastern half is on the slopes and crests of South Mountain, the highest point of which is the summit of Snowy Mountain, with an elevation exceeding 2,080 feet (630 m). The Appalachian Trail traverses the eastern side of the township.

The borough of Mont Alto is surrounded by the northern part of the township but is a separate municipality.

Pennsylvania Route 997 crosses the center of the township, leading north through Mont Alto to Scotland, and south to Waynesboro. Pennsylvania Route 316 passes through the western part of the township, leading north to Chambersburg, the county seat, and south to Waynesboro. Pennsylvania Route 233 runs east from Mont Alto through the northern part of the township, passing Mont Alto State Park and leading north into Guilford Township and then to Caledonia State Park.

The unincorporated community of Old Forge is located in the southeastern part of the township, where the East Branch of Antietam Creek emerges from South Mountain. Other unincorporated communities include Quincy, which lies along PA 997 between Mont Alto and Waynesboro, and South Mountain, in the northeast corner of the township and home of the South Mountain Restoration Center.

According to the United States Census Bureau, the township has a total area of 45.2 square miles (117.1 km^{2}), of which 0.01 square miles (0.02 km^{2}), or 0.02%, is water.

=== Neighboring Townships ===
- Antrim Township (west)
- Guilford Township (north)
- Hamiltonban Township (Adams County), (east)
- Washington Township (south)

== Communities ==
- Altenwald
- Biesecker Gap
- Elbrook
- Fairview
- Five Forks
- Fox Hill
- Jugtown
- Knepper
- Nicodemus
- Nunnery
- Old Forge
- Quinsonia
- Quincy
- South Mountain
- Tomstown

== Demographics ==
Historical population
Census	Pop.	Note	%±
2000	5,846		—
2010	5,541		−5.2%
2020	5,318		−4.0%
2016 (est.)	5,494		−0.8%
U.S. Decennial Census

As of the census of 2000, there were 5,846 people, 1,816 households, and 1,416 families residing in the township.

The population density was 130.9 inhabitants per square mile (50.5/km^{2}). There were 1,917 housing units at an average density of 42.9 per square mile (16.6/km^{2}).

The racial makeup of the township was 95.84% White, 2.22% African American, 0.12% Native American, 0.48% Asian, 0.02% Pacific Islander, 0.68% from other races, and 0.63% from two or more races. Hispanic or Latino of any race were 1.18% of the population.

There were 1,816 households, out of which 30.8% had children under the age of eighteen living with them; 66.7% were married couples living together, 6.9% had a female householder with no husband present, and 22.0% were non-families. 18.9% of all households were made up of individuals, and 10.8% had someone living alone who was sixty-five years of age or older.

The average household size was 2.67 and the average family size was 3.02.

Within the township, the population was spread out, with 23.3% of residents who were under the age of eighteen, 13.9% who were aged eighteen to twenty-four, 22.9% who were aged twenty-five to forty-four, 20.4% who were aged forty-five to sixty-four, and 19.6% who were sixty-five years of age or older. The median age was thirty-seven years.

For every one hundred females, there were 100.1 males. For every one hundred females who were aged eighteen or older, there were 90.9 males.

The median income for a household in the township was $41,214, and the median income for a family was $47,350. Males had a median income of $30,451 compared with that of $23,663 for females.

The per capita income for the township was $16,816.

Approximately 4.2% of families and 8.5% of the population were living below the poverty line, including 13.1% of those who were under the age of eighteen and 10.3% of those who were aged sixty-five or older.
