= Mont Alto Railroad =

Railway line in Pennsylvania, United States

Mont Alto Rail Road

Overview
- Headquarters: Mont Alto?
- Locale: Franklin County, Pennsylvania
- Dates of operation: 1872–1901
- Successor: Cumberland Valley and Waynesboro Railroad

Technical
- Track gauge: 4 ft 8 1/2 in (1,435 mm) standard gauge

The Mont Alto Rail Road was a railroad in Franklin County, Pennsylvania, originally built to connect the blast furnaces of the Mont Alto Iron Company to the Cumberland Valley Railroad. It was later extended south to reach Waynesboro.

== History ==
Incorporated as the Scotland and Mont Alto Railroad on May 3, 1864, it was proposed to run from the Cumberland Valley Railroad near Scotland to the iron company's furnaces near Mont Alto. Renamed the Mont Alto Rail Road on November 22, 1871, it opened from Chambersburg to Mont Alto in October 1872.

In 1875, the iron company opened Mont Alto Park on its property, and the railroad began carrying picnickers to the park. In May 1878, the company began extending a new line south from Ledy, near Mont Alto, to Waynesboro. This was done in part to interfere with the Harrisburg and Potomac Railroad. The new line was completed in April 1879, and the Mont Alto Rail Road was leased to the Cumberland Valley Railroad. However, it continued to operate its own locomotives until 1894.

In 1891, the short-lived Chambersburg and Gettysburg Railroad opened from a connection with the Mont Alto RR at Conococheague Junction, near Fayetteville. The iron ore and lumber it hauled proved insufficient to sustain it, and it ended operations in 1893.

Cumberland Valley and Waynesboro Railroad
Overview
- Locale: Franklin County, Pennsylvania
- Dates of operation: 1901–1906
- Successor: Cumberland Valley Railroad

Technical
- Track gauge: 4 ft 8 1/2 in (1,435 mm) standard gauge

On April 27, 1901, the Mont Alto Rail Road was sold at foreclosure, and reorganized on June 7, 1901, as the Cumberland Valley and Waynesboro Railroad. Mont Alto Park was turned over to the Commonwealth of Pennsylvania in 1902. The new company was sold to the Cumberland Valley Rail Road on June 30, 1906.

The Cumberland Valley was itself merged into the Pennsylvania Railroad on 1919; the bulk of the Cumberland Valley & Waynesboro became the Waynesboro Branch, and the spur from Ledy to Mont Alto Park the Mont Alto Park Track. The PRR List of Stations and Sidings (CT 1000) from 1923 reveals a mostly rural branch, with little industry online except for sand mining at Pond Bank and manufacturing in the town of Waynesboro. Passenger service on the Waynesboro and the Mont Alto Park Track ended June 28, 1933. The 1945 CT 1000 shows a picture not dissimilar to that of 1923. The sand companies at Pond Bank had disappeared and an elevator company opened in East Fayetteville, but the branch was still essentially rural, except for the industries it served at Waynesboro.

The Mont Alto Park spur was the first part to be dismantled; then in 1972, the entire railroad from Chambersburg to Waynesboro was abandoned by Penn Central. After a brief revival of service in 1975, it was permanently abandoned in 1976 on the formation of Conrail.

== Stations ==
Waynesboro Branch

Name	Mileage	Notes
Waynesboro Junction	0.0	connection with Cumberland Valley Railroad
Burgner	1.8	
Brookside	3.5	
Woodstock	4.0	
Fayetteville	5.6	
East Fayetteville	7.2	
Pond Bank	10.0	
Ledy	10.8	junction Mont Alto Park Track, 10.7 mi.
Mont Alto	12.2	
Knepper	13.1	
Good	14.2	
Quincy	14.9	
Orphanage	15.2	
Nunnery	16.2	
Waynesboro	18.3	connection with Western Maryland Railway at 18.0 and 19.1 mi.

Mont Alto Park Track

Name	Mileage	Notes
Ledy	0.0	connection with Waynesboro Branch
Mont Alto Park	1.4	no station listed in CT 1000
