= Michaux State Forest =

State forest in southern Pennsylvania, United States

- IUCN category VI (protected area with sustainable use of natural resources)
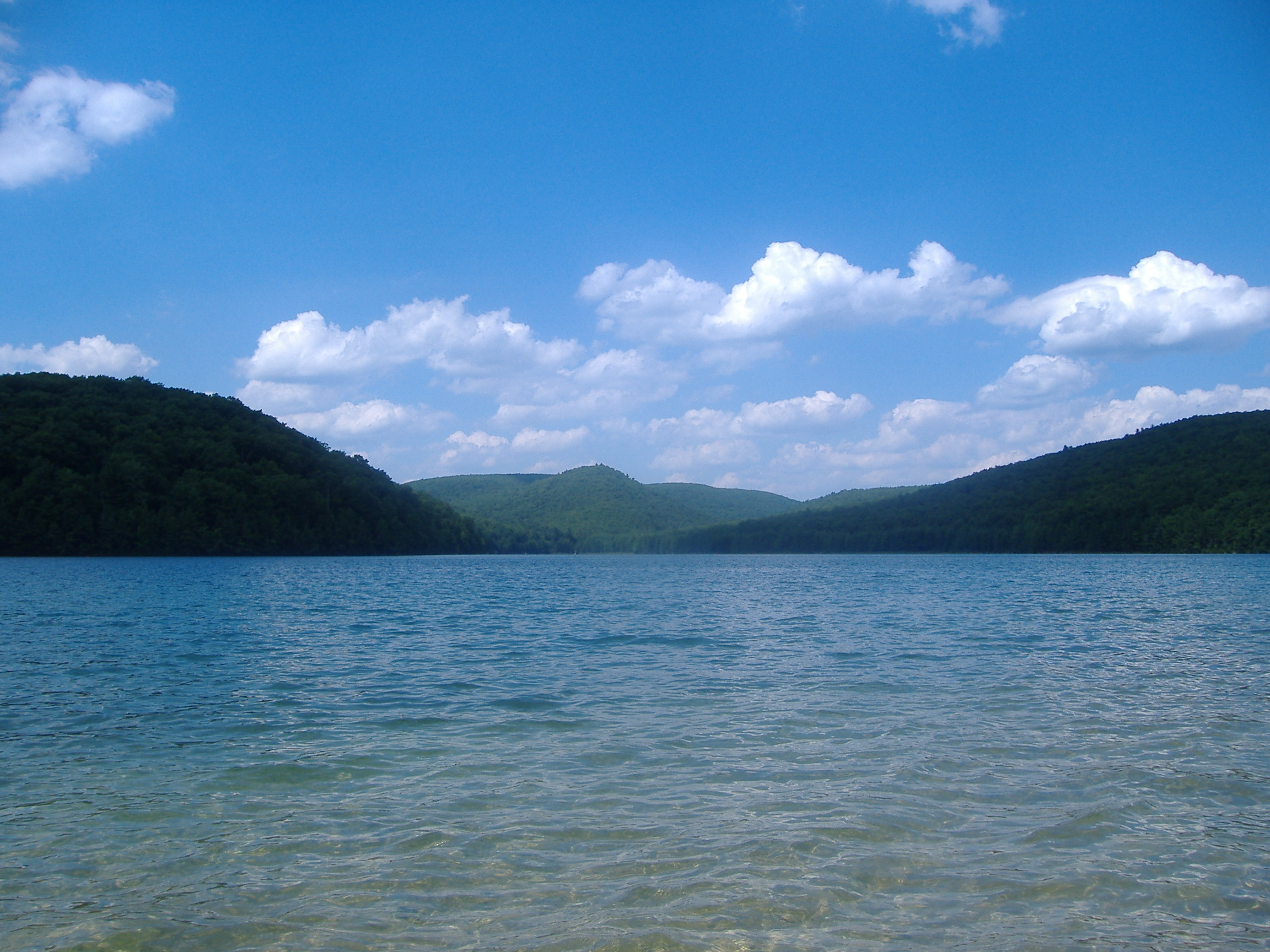
- Long Pine Run Reservoir in Michaux State Forest

- Location within Pennsylvania
- Location: Pennsylvania, United States
- Coordinates: 39°54′43″N 77°33′49″W
- Area: 85,000 acres (340 km^{2})
- Named for: André Michaux
- Governing body: Pennsylvania Department of Conservation and Natural Resources
- Website: Michaux State Forest

Michaux State Forest is a Pennsylvania State Forest in Pennsylvania Bureau of Forestry District #1. The main offices are located in Fayetteville in Franklin County, Pennsylvania, USA.

The Michaux State Forest is in several tracts covering 85,500 acres (34,600 ha) located in Adams County, southern Cumberland County, eastern Franklin County, and northwestern York County. The Appalachian Trail also runs through Michaux State Forest.

== History ==
Michaux State Forest is named for André Michaux, a French botanist. He was dispatched in 1785 by King Louis XVI and his Queen Marie Antoinette to gather plants for the Royal Gardens.

Michaux State Forest was formed as a direct result of the depletion of the forests of Pennsylvania that took place during the mid-to-late 19th century. Conservationists such as Joseph Rothrock became concerned that the forests would not regrow if they were not managed properly. Lumber and iron companies had harvested the old-growth forests for various reasons. They clear cut the forests and left behind nothing but dried tree tops and rotting stumps. The sparks of passing steam locomotives ignited wildfires that prevented the formation of second growth forests. The conservationists feared that the forest would never regrow if there was not a change in the philosophy of forest management. They called for the state to purchase land from the lumber and iron companies and the lumber and iron companies were more than willing to sell their land since that had depleted the natural resources of the forests. The changes began to take place in 1895 when Rothrock was appointed the first commissioner of the Pennsylvania Department of Forests and Waters, the forerunner of today's Pennsylvania Department of Conservation and Natural Resources. The Pennsylvania General Assembly passed a piece of legislation in 1897 that authorized the purchase of "unseated lands for forest reservations". This was the beginning of the State Forest system.

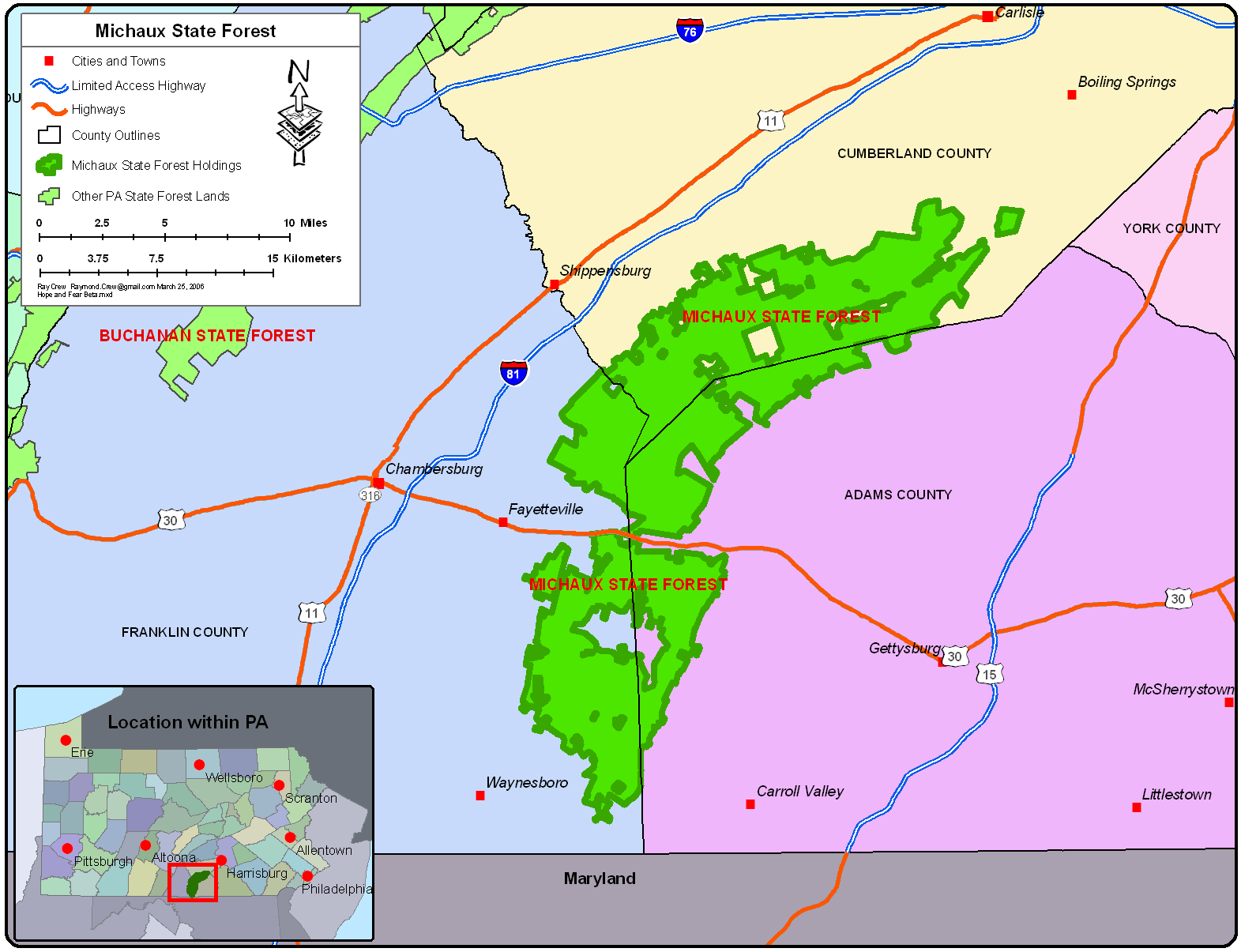
A map of the state forest showing forest boundaries and nearby highways.

The land that is now Michaux State Forest was once owned by several large iron companies. The iron companies used the old growth forests of South Central Pennsylvania to fire their iron furnaces such as Pine Grove Furnace, Caledonia, and Mont Alto. Colliers gathered the wood and created charcoal by slowly burning the logs in massive charcoal kilns that dotted the landscape of what is now Michaux State Forest.

Michaux State Forest is the location of several "firsts" in Pennsylvania Forestry. The first state nursery was established at Mont Alto in 1902. Rothrock opened the first forestry school in Pennsylvania and the second in the United States at what is now Penn State Mont Alto. Ralph E. Brock, the first academically trained African American forester in the United States, supervised the seed nursery at the state forest from 1906 to 1911. Michaux State Forest saw the first wooden fire tower in 1905 as well as the first steel fire tower in 1914.

Michaux State Forest is now a thriving second growth forest. It is open to recreational hunting, fishing, hiking, mountain biking, and horse riding. It is crossed by the Appalachian Trail. Remnants of the charcoal days can still be seen in the state forest as the land where the kilns burned for so many years has yet to fully recover. Visitors to the park will notice these areas as large grassy meadows that are surrounded by the woods of Michaux State Forest.

== Neighboring state forest districts ==
The U.S. state of Maryland is to the south

- Tuscarora State Forest (north)
- Weiser State Forest (northeast)
- William Penn State Forest (east)
- Buchanan State Forest (west)

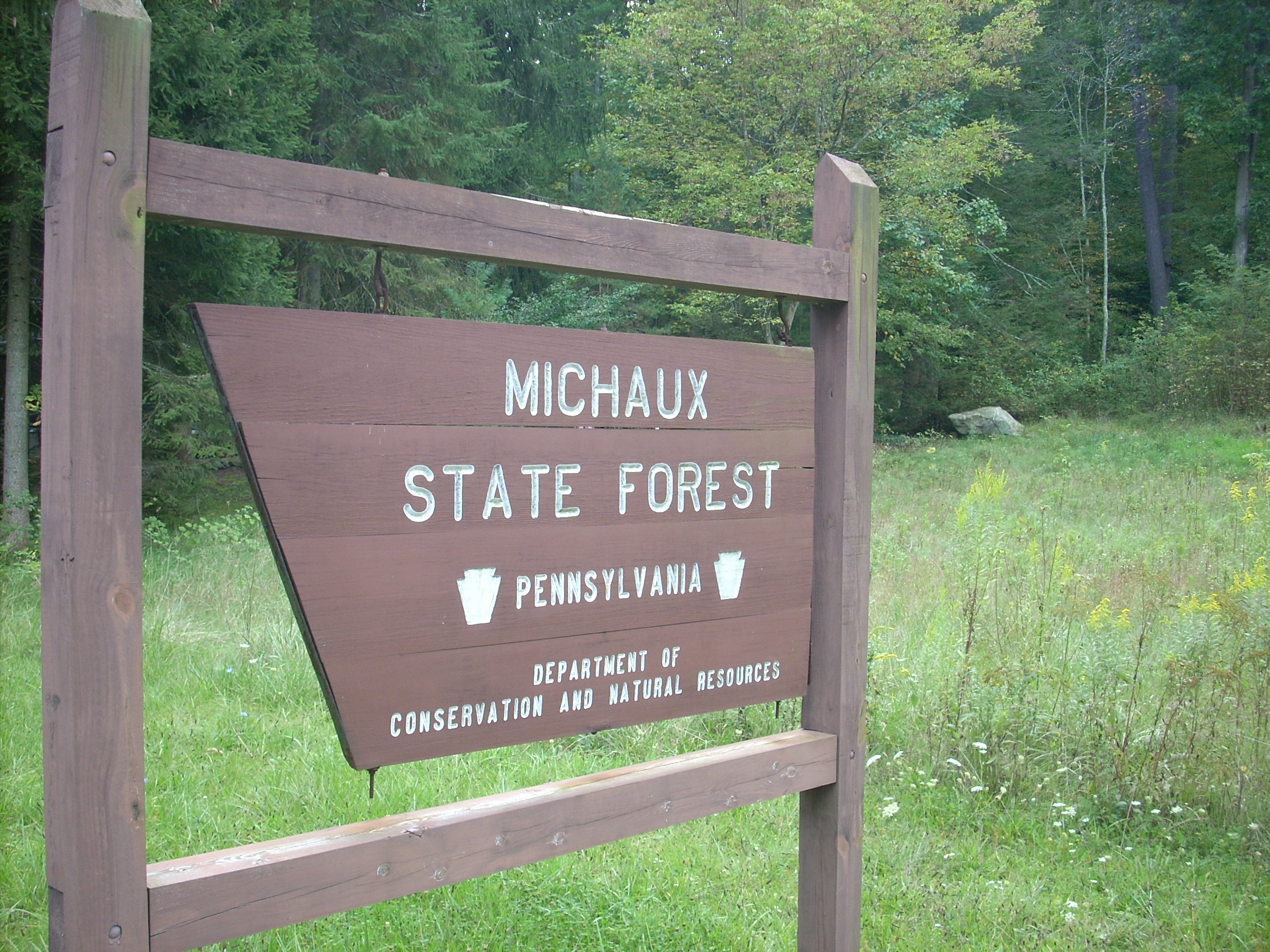

== Nearby state parks ==
- Caledonia State Park
- Pine Grove Furnace State Park
- Mont Alto State Park
- Kings Gap Environmental Education and Training Center

== Natural and wild areas ==
- Beartown Woods Natural Area
- Carbaugh Run Natural Area
- Meeting of the Pines Natural Area
- Mount Cydonia Ponds Natural Area
