= Old Forge, Pennsylvania =

Old Forge, Pennsylvania may refer to:

- Old Forge, Franklin County, Pennsylvania
- Old Forge, Lackawanna County, Pennsylvania
