= Tomstown =

Tomstown may refer to:

- Tomstown, Ontario
- Tomstown, Pennsylvania
