= List of Pennsylvania state historical markers in Franklin County =

Location of Franklin County in Pennsylvania

This is a list of the Pennsylvania state historical markers in Franklin County.

This is intended to be a complete list of the official state historical markers placed in Franklin County, Pennsylvania by the Pennsylvania Historical and Museum Commission (PHMC). The locations of the historical markers, as well as the latitude and longitude coordinates as provided by the PHMC's database, are included below when available. There are 70 historical markers located in Franklin County.

== Historical markers ==
| Marker title | Image | Date dedicated | Location | Marker type | Topics |
| 54th Mass. Infantry Regiment, US Colored Troops (The) | | November 7, 2009 | Zion Union Cemetery, Bennette Ave., Mercersburg; 39.82031°N 77.90564°W | Roadside | African American, Civil War, Military |
| Brown's Mill School | | April 20, 1966 | At site - off Rt. 11 via Kaufman Rd., at Angle & Brown's Mill Rds., SE of Marion; 39.8307°N 77.702°W | Roadside | Buildings, Education |
| Buchanan House | | July 2, 1953 | 17 N Main St., Mercersburg; 39.8288°N 77.0963°W | City | Exploration, Government & Politics, Government & Politics 19th Century, Professions & Vocations |
| Burning of Chambersburg | | December 5, 1947 | SE corner of square at Rts. 30 & 11, Chambersburg; 39.9375°N 76.3389°W | Roadside | Civil War, Military |
| Burning of Chambersburg | | December 5, 1947 | Pa. 416, 200 yards N of state line 39.7222°N 76.1963°W | Roadside | Civil War, Military |
| Caledonia Furnace | | August 25, 1947 | US 30 & PA 233, Caledonia State Park, east end of Fayetteville | Roadside | African American, Business & Industry, Civil War, Furnaces, Military |
| Captain Ulric Dahlgren | | June 1, 1954 | SE section of Square, Greencastle; 39.79°N 77.7275°W | City | Civil War, Military |
| Chambersburg | | 1948 | U.S. 11, .3 mile S of borough line | Roadside | Cities & Towns, Civil War, Early Settlement, Government & Politics |
| Chambersburg | | n/a | US 11 & Roland Ave., 1.5 miles N of Chambersburg, near borough line 39.9559°N 77.64507°W | Roadside | Cities & Towns, Civil War, Early Settlement, Government & Politics |
| Chambersburg | | 1948 | US 30 W end of Chambersburg | Roadside | Cities & Towns, Civil War, Early Settlement, Government & Politics |
| Chambersburg | | n/a | US 30 at I-81, west side of intersection, E end of Chambersburg; 39.9294°N 76.3631°W | Roadside | Cities & Towns, Civil War, Government & Politics |
| Confederate Conference | | August 10, 1953 | SW quadrant of public square, Chambersburg; 39.9372°N 76.3384°W | City | Civil War, Military |
| Dr. Henry Harbaugh | | December 5, 1947 | 14301 Harbaugh Church Rd., (@ church), off Midvale Rd. south of Midvale; 39.7214°N 76.4664°W | Roadside | Education, Ethnic & Immigration, Professions & Vocations, Religion |
| Falling Spring Church | | May 10, 1948 | US 11 at church, 2 blocks N of Square, Chambersburg | City | Buildings, Ethnic & Immigration, Religion |
| First Lutheran Church | | August 10, 1953 | W. Washington St. at church (near Black St.), Chambersburg; 39.9344°N 76.3366°W | City | Buildings, Religion |
| Fort Chambers | | June 3, 1947 | W. King St., 1 block W of US 11, Chambersburg; 39.9391°N 76.3378°W | City | Early Settlement, Forts, French & Indian War, Military, Mills, Native American |
| Fort Davis | | October 29, 1946 | PA 995 & Bain Rd. (near Church of Brethren at Welsh Run); 39.75952°N 77.86262°W | Roadside | Forts, French & Indian War, Military |
| Fort Davis - PLAQUE | | June 1, 1931 | on private farm, W side of Bain Rd., 1.3 mi. S of PA 995 at Welsh Run; 39.744°N 76.1239°W | Plaque | Forts, French & Indian War, Government & Politics 18th Century, Military |
| Fort Loudon | | May 27, 1947 | US 30 & Brooklyn Rd., ~1 mile E of Fort Loudon (Missing); 39.9063°N 76.119°W | Roadside | Forts, French & Indian War, Military |
| Fort Loudon - PLAQUE | | October 1, 1915 | US 30 (Old Lincoln Hwy.), in center of Fort Loudon; 39.9148°N 76.0951°W | Plaque | Forts, French & Indian War, Military |
| Fort Marshall | | 1946 | Valley Rd. & Shimpstown Rd., S of Mercersburg | Roadside | Forts, French & Indian War, Military |
| Fort McCord | | August 8, 1947 | ~2.5 miles NE of Edenville on SR 4008 at Rumler Rd. 39.986°N 76.2277°W | Roadside | Forts, French & Indian War, Military, Native American |
| Fort McCord - PLAQUE | | October 1, 1914 | ~2.5 mi. NE of Edenville up SR 4008 to Rumler Rd., ~.5 mi. south to barn, plaque within fence on left 39.985°N 76.2266°W | Plaque | Early Settlement, Forts, French & Indian War, Military, Native American |
| Fort McDowell | | September 10, 1947 | Pa. 416 at Markes, junction of Mercersburg & Lamar Rds. 39.8747°N 76.1284°W | Roadside | Forts, French & Indian War, Military, Mills |
| Fort McDowell - PLAQUE | | October 1, 1916 | PA 416 at Markes, junction of Mercersburg & Lamar Rds. 39.8747°N 76.1284°W | Plaque | Forts, French & Indian War, Military, Mills, Roads |
| Fort Waddell | | May 27, 1947 | U.S. 30, near junction Pa. 416, 1 mile W of St. Thomas (MISSING); 39.9612°N 76.1793°W | Roadside | Early Settlement, Forts, French & Indian War, Military, Native American |
| Fort Waddell (1754) - PLAQUE | | n/a | Route 30, W of Chambersburg, near PA416 junction, 1 mi W of St. Thomas (N side); 39.9112°N 76.1795°W | Plaque | Forts, French & Indian War, Military |
| Franklin County | | May 15, 1982 | County Courthouse, Memorial Square (N. Main St.), corner of U.S. 11 & 30, Chambersburg; 39.9376°N 76.3389°W | City | Cities & Towns, Government & Politics, Government & Politics 18th Century |
| Frederick Douglass and John Brown | | August 21, 1994 | West Washington St., behind Southgate Mall, Chambersburg; 39.93476°N 77.66664°W | Roadside | African American, Government & Politics 19th Century, Military |
| George H. Wirt (1880 - 1961) | | October 1, 2005 | near PSU Mont Alto campus, approx. 120 yds. E of Slabtown Rd. on south side of PA 233 | Roadside | Environment, Government & Politics 20th Century |
| Gettysburg campaign | | November 2, 1964 | PA 16 at Roadside Ave., E of square in Waynesboro; 39.7516°N 76.4296°W | Roadside | Civil War, Military |
| Gettysburg campaign | | November 2, 1964 | US 11, just N of Greencastle; 39.8041°N 76.2775°W | Roadside | Civil War, Military |
| Gettysburg campaign | | December 5, 1997 | US 11, 1 mile N of State Line; 39.7321°N 76.2751°W | Roadside | Civil War, Military |
| Gettysburg campaign | | January 10, 1948 | US 30E near intersection w/ Willowbrook Dr., just E of Chambersburg, ~.5 mi past I81 (at veterinary clinic); 39.9268°N 76.3734°W | Roadside | Civil War, Military |
| Gettysburg campaign | | December 5, 1947 | US 11 near Roland Ave., 1.5 mi. N of Chambersburg; 39.9569°N 76.3557°W | Roadside | Civil War, Military |
| Gettysburg campaign | | December 5, 1947 | US 11 at Kriner, at Trickling Spgs. Creamery, S of Chambersburg; 39.90486°N 77.67223°W | Roadside | Civil War, Military |
| Israel Benevolent Society Cemetery | | May 12, 2002 | 361 East Washington Street, Chambersburg; 39.9336°N 76.3441°W | Roadside | Civil War, Military, Religion |
| Jacob Nelson "Nellie" Fox | | August 3, 2001 | 7417 Lincoln Hwy. (US 30), at Schoolhouse Road (square), St. Thomas; 39.9174°N 76.2016°W | City | Baseball, Sports |
| James Buchanan | | January 1, 1955 | PA 16W, @ fork of Stoney Batter & Buchanan Sts., at Buchanan State Park entrance, Cove Gap; 39.8665°N 76.0553°W | Roadside | Buildings, Education, Government & Politics, Government & Politics 18th Century |
| John Brown | | n/a | 225 E. King St., Chambersburg; 39.93881°N 77.65831°W | City | African American, Government & Politics 19th Century, Military |
| John Brown Raid | | June 11, 1947 | PA 233, 1 mile E of Mont Alto, across from PSU campus 39.8404°N 76.4553°W | Roadside | African American, Government & Politics 19th Century, Military |
| John Wallace Jr. | | June 27, 1955 | E. Main & Enterprise Sts., Waynesboro; 39.751°N 76.4317°W | City | Professions & Vocations |
| Joseph G. Armstrong | | May 14, 1960 | SR 4010 at Coble Rd. near Edenville; 39.9631°N 76.2139°W | Roadside | Early Settlement, French & Indian War, Government & Politics 18th Century, Military, Native American |
| Joseph Winters | | May 23, 2005 | Junior Hose and Truck Company #2, 130 N Second St., Chambersburg | City | African American, Entrepreneurs, Invention, Native American, Police and Safety, Underground Railroad |
| Lane House | | July 2, 1953 | 16 N. Main St., Mercersburg; 39.8287°N 76.0962°W | City | Government & Politics, Government & Politics 19th Century |
| Margaret Cochran Corbin | | October 1, 1961 | US 11 near Roand Ave., 1.5 miles N of Chambersburg; 39.9572°N 76.356°W | Roadside | American Revolution, Military, Women |
| Marshall College | | May 1, 1953 | PA 16 at entrance to Mercersburg Academy, Mercersburg; 39.8283°N 76.1005°W | Roadside | Education, Religion |
| Martin Delany (1812-1885) | | October 25, 2003 | 566 S. Main St., Chambersburg | Roadside | African American, Civil Rights, Military, Professions & Vocations, Publishing, Underground Railroad |
| Masonic Temple | | November 30, 1964 | S. 2nd St. near E. Queen St., Chambersburg; 39.9359°N 76.3406°W | City | Buildings, Civil War, Military |
| Masonic Temple | | November 30, 1964 | S 2nd St. (northbound) near E. Queen St., Chambersburg (Missing) | City | Religion |
| Messersmith's Wood | | August 20, 1973 | Lincoln Hwy. (US 30) near Colbrook Ave., Chambersburg; 39.9318°N 76.3555°W | City | Civil War, Military |
| Morrow Tavern | | August 1, 1953 | 37 S. Main St., Chambersburg; 39.9368°N 76.3385°W | City | Buildings, Business & Industry, George Washington, Military, Inns & Taverns, Whiskey Rebellion |
| Old Franklin County Jail | | May 9, 1975 | N. 2nd St. at E. King St. (US 11), Chambersburg; 39.939°N 76.341°W | Roadside | Government & Politics, Government & Politics 19th Century |
| Old Log Building | | June 27, 1955 | E. Main St. & Roadside Ave., Waynesboro; 39.752°N 76.4294°W | City | Buildings, Education |
| Patrick Gass (1771-1870) | | January 13, 2004 | 181 Franklin Farm Lane, Chambersburg, off Rt. 30 at Sheetz | Roadside | Environment, Exploration, Military, War of 1812 |
| Pennsylvania | | January 1, 1949 | US 11 at Mason Dixon Rd., Middleburg, near MD state line | Roadside | Early Settlement, Government & Politics 17th Century, William Penn |
| Pennsylvania State Forest Academy | | May 13, 2003 | just off Park St. (Rt. 233) on Campus Dr., at entrance of PSU, Mont Alto | Roadside | Education, Environment, Government & Politics 20th Century |
| Philip Berlin | | August 10, 1953 | W. Washington St. & Black Ave. at Lutheran Church, Chambersburg; 39.9345°N 76.3369°W | City | Invention, Professions & Vocations, Railroads, Transportation |
| Ralph Elwood Brock | | October 24, 2003 | Park St. (Rt. 233) at Slabtown Rd., entrance to PSU, Mont Alto | Roadside | African American, Education, Environment, Professions & Vocations |
| Reformed Theological Seminary | | May 1, 1953 | PA 16 at entrance to Mercersburg Academy, Mercersburg; 39.8284°N 76.1006°W | Roadside | Education, Religion |
| Rev. Steel's Fort | | June 3, 1947 | Buchanan Trail (PA 16) at Findley Rd., 2.3 miles SE of Mercersburg; 39.804°N 76.1302°W | Roadside | French & Indian War, Military, Native American |
| Shippensburg | | June 1, 1948 | W King St. (US 11) at Park Heights Ave., W end of Shippensburg; 40.0425°N 76.4648°W | Roadside | Cities & Towns |
| Snow Hill Cloister | | December 21, 1966 | PA 997 just S of Quincy; 39.7898°N 76.425°W | Roadside | Religion |
| Stuart's Raid | | December 5, 1947 | Blair's Valley Rd., about 100 yds. N of state line | Roadside | Civil War, Military |
| Suesserott House | | May 1, 1969 | SW corner of Main & Washington Sts., Chambersburg; 39.9342°N 76.3377°W | City | Buildings, Civil War, Houses & Homesteads, Military, Professions & Vocations |
| Thompson's Rifle Battalion: Capt. James Chambers' Company | | July 28, 1991 | W King St., 1 block W of US 11, in Ft. Chambers Park, Chambersburg; 39.9388°N 76.3377°W | Roadside | American Revolution, Military |
| Underground Railroad Activity in Chambersburg | | January 15, 2003 | Main St. & Lincoln Hwy. (Rt. 30), on NE quadrant of the "diamond," Chambersburg | Roadside | African American, Underground Railroad |
| Widow Barr Place | | June 20, 1955 | PA 75, 1.4 miles S of Fort Loudon (Missing); 39.8944°N 76.1023°W | Roadside | American Revolution, Buildings, Early Settlement, Native American |
| William Findlay | | April 1, 1950 | N. Main St. at Mill Rd., Mercersburg; 39.8303°N 76.096°W | City | Government & Politics, Government & Politics 18th Century, Governors |
| Wilson College | | October 10, 1952 | Edgar Ave. near Ramsey Ave., off US 11 at campus, Chambersburg; 39.9499°N 76.3515°W | Roadside | Education, Women |

== See also ==
- List of Pennsylvania state historical markers
- National Register of Historic Places listings in Franklin County, Pennsylvania
