= South Mountain, Pennsylvania =

Unincorporated community in Pennsylvania, US

- Unincorporated community
- Location within Pennsylvania
- Coordinates: 39°50′47″N 77°29′16″W
- Country: United States
- State: Pennsylvania
- County: Franklin
- Elevation: 1,594 ft (486 m)
- Time zone: UTC-5 (Eastern (EST))
  - Summer (DST): UTC-4 (EDT)
- ZIP code: 17261
- Area codes: 223 & 717
- GNIS feature ID: 1188089

South Mountain is an unincorporated community in Quincy Township in southeastern Franklin County, Pennsylvania, United States. The community is located 3.8 miles (6.1 km) east of Mont Alto. South Mountain has a post office, with ZIP code 17261.
