= Carbaugh Run Natural Area =

Natural area in Pennsylvania

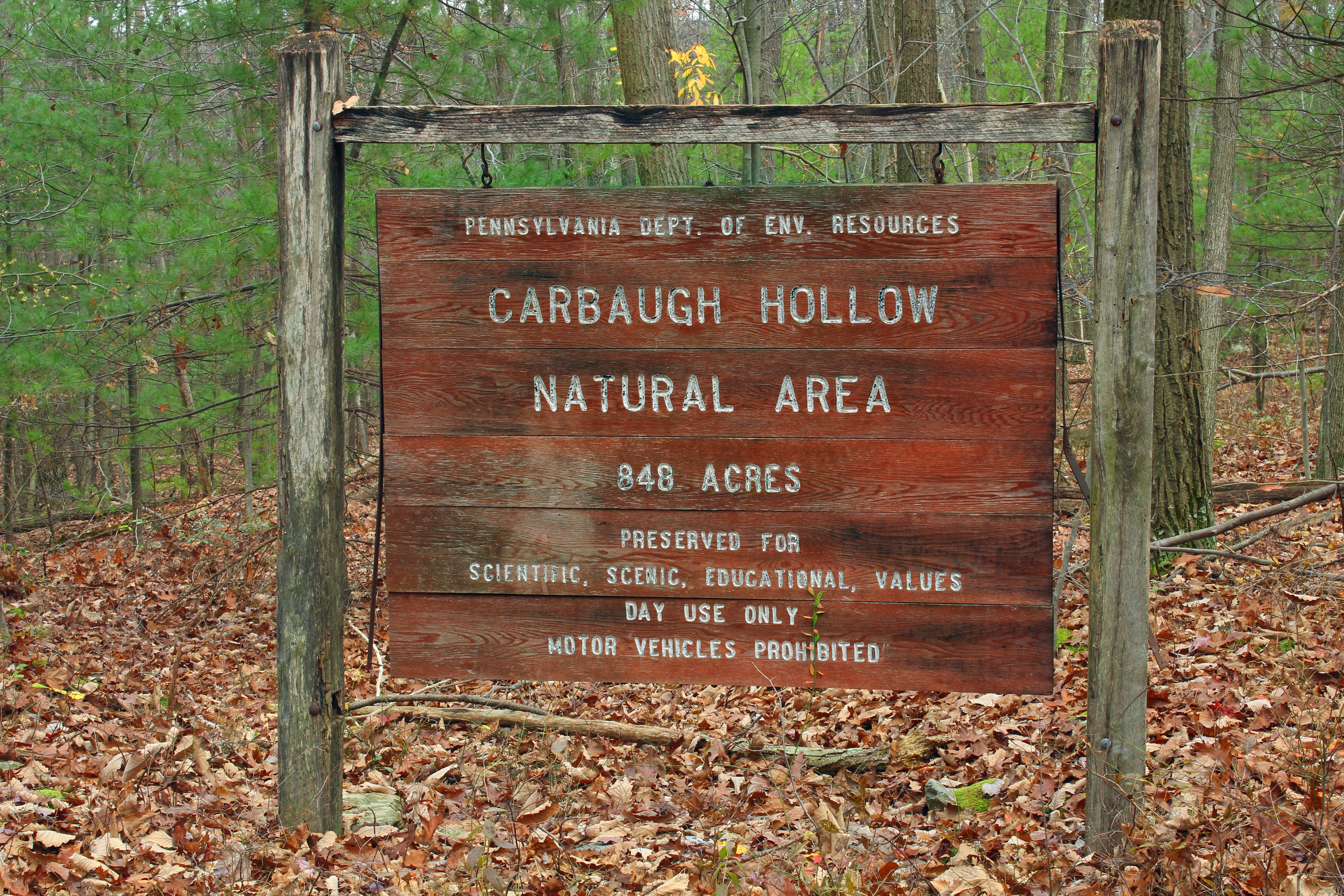
- An old sign at Carbaugh Run Natural Area, which has since been renamed

- Location within Pennsylvania
- Location: Adams County, Pennsylvania
- Nearest town: Fayetteville
- Coordinates: 39°53′24″N 77°26′51″W
- Area: 780 acres (320 ha)

Carbaugh Run Natural Area is a 780-acre (320 ha) protected area in Adams County, Pennsylvania, United States. It is part of Michaux State Forest.

== Description ==
The Natural Area was established to protect a Native American archeological site, and it is also a designated Reptile and Amphibian Protection Area. The area is rich in the mineral rhyolite, which has been used by Native Americans to make tools for more than 12,000 years. The area is a site of ongoing research by archeologists.
