= Mount Cydonia Ponds Natural Area =

Natural area in Pennsylvania

- Location within Pennsylvania
- Location: Franklin County, Pennsylvania
- Nearest town: Fayeteeville
- Coordinates: 39°53′44″N 77°30′42″W
- Area: 183 acres (74 ha)

Mount Cydonia Ponds Natural Area is a 183-acre (74 ha) protected area in Franklin County, Pennsylvania, United States. It is part of Michaux State Forest.

== Description ==
The Natural Area was established to protect more than 60 vernal pools that serve as breeding grounds for amphibians in the spring. Salamanders and frogs are especially prevalent, and the area is also critical habitat for several threatened species of reptiles. While a few of the ponds originated from iron ore mining pits, most are natural and preserve pollen and spores dating back to the last ice age.
