= Ralph E. Brock =

American forester (1881–1959)

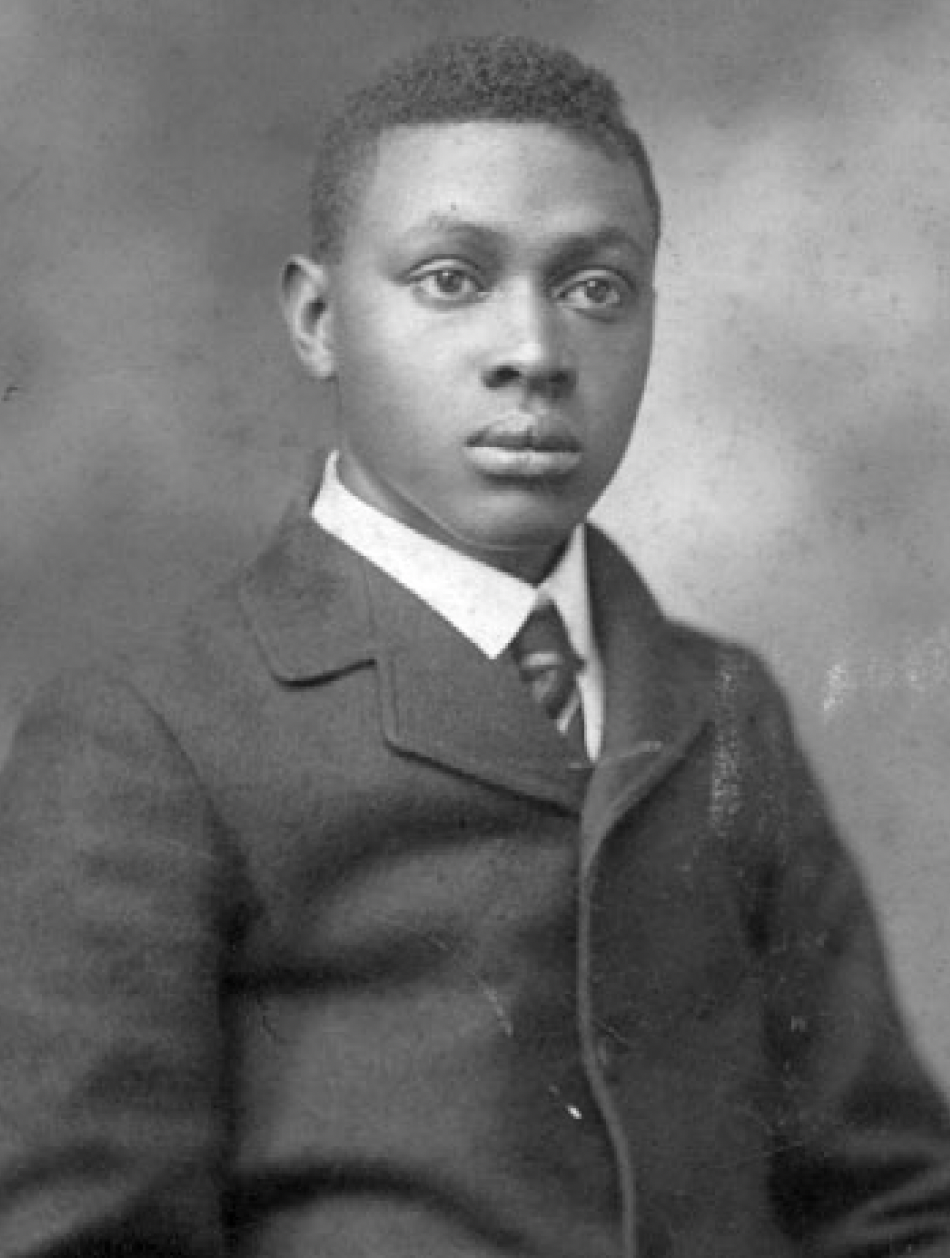
- Brock c. 1903
- Born: Ralph Elwood Brock; February 15, 1881; Pottsville, Pennsylvania, U.S.
- Died: December 9, 1959 (aged 78); Lawnside, New Jersey, U.S.
- Resting place: Chestnut Grove Cemetery, West Chester, Pennsylvania
- Education: University of Pennsylvania; Penn State Mont Alto
- Occupation: Forester
- Known for: First African American trained forester in the United States

Ralph Elwood Brock (February 15, 1881 – December 9, 1959) was an American forester and protégé of Joseph Trimble Rothrock. Graduating from the Pennsylvania State Forest Academy in 1906, he worked as the Michaux State Forest nursery superintendent from 1906 to 1911. In 2003, the Pennsylvania Historical and Museum Commission commemorated him with a state historical marker at the Penn State Mont Alto campus. Brock was the first academically trained African American forester in the United States.

== Early life and education ==
Brock was born on February 15, 1881, in Pottsville, Pennsylvania, to John C. Brock (1843–1901) and Alcinda Jane (Dickson) Brock. A Union Army veteran who served in the 43rd Colored Infantry Regiment during the American Civil War, John Brock worked as a schoolteacher and a minister of the African Methodist Episcopal Church. The family lived in Harrisburg, West Chester, Carlisle, and other Pennsylvania towns during Ralph's childhood. Brock attended West Chester public schools and graduated from Howard High School, a respected preparatory school for African American students in Wilmington, Delaware, in 1900.

Brock soon became a protégé of Pennsylvania forestry commissioner Joseph Trimble Rothrock, to whom West Chester school superintendent Addison L. Jones had introduced him. Brock briefly studied botany at the University of Pennsylvania and in 1904 published a short paper in Forest Leaves, the official organ of the Pennsylvania Forestry Association. In 1901, Rothrock arranged for Brock to accompany forester George H. Wirt as a student assistant to establish the Mont Alto State Forest Reserve (now Michaux State Forest).

In 1903, Brock enrolled in the Pennsylvania State Forest Academy (the future Penn State Mont Alto), one of only three forestry schools in the United States at the time. He ranked second in the academy's inaugural graduating class of 1906. Of his six-man cohort, Brock was the only African American, making him the first academically trained forester in Pennsylvania and in the United States. More than thirty years later, the University of Washington would graduate the nation's second Black forester, Jim Johnston, in 1942.

== Forestry and gardening career ==
On graduation, Brock became full-time supervisor of the state forest's seed nursery, overseeing the nursery's predominantly White staff and students from September 1, 1906, until March 1, 1911. He authored technical reports and presented two papers at the first state foresters' convention in 1908, speaking on the subjects of "Fertilizers in Renewing Nursery Soil" and "Broadcast Sowing vs. Drill Planting."

Brock left state service after three years and six months to start his own business managing landscaping, gardens, and orchards. Someone who graduated from the academy in 1909 said that “Brock had a hard time of it for none of the boys could quite content himself being ordered around by a darky, regardless of his ability.” In addition to the racism he faced, Brock and his wife, accustomed to bustling towns and rolling farmland, may have struggled with isolation. On rainy days, he reportedly sat for hours staring out of the window and was heard to mutter, "Trees, trees, nothing but trees!"

After moving back to West Chester, Brock founded a seed nursery and cared for gardens and orchards at estates in the region. He worked in the nursery business in Cleveland, Ohio, probably from 1918 to 1928. In 1928, Brock was hired by John D. Rockefeller Jr. as a gardener for the Paul Laurence Dunbar Apartments in Harlem, where Brock worked until at least 1937. Brock also was employed as a supervisor of the Radio City Gardens at Rockefeller Center and at Riverside Park in Manhattan, though historians have not identified his dates of employment at these two sites. From 1944 to 1945, Brock worked part-time as an assistant gardener at the Harlem River Houses, a public housing development in Harlem.

== Personal life and death ==
Brock retired in 1957 due to failing health. He died in Lawnside, New Jersey, on December 9, 1959, at the age of 79. He was survived by his wife, Pauline Wethers of West Chester, whom he had married in 1908, and their son Russell T.

Brock's remains were interred in Chestnut Grove Cemetery outside West Chester.

== Legacy ==
Brock was the first African American forester in the United States to complete a formal training program in forestry. In 2000, the Pennsylvania Department of Conservation and Natural Resources renamed Mont Alto's South Mountain Seed Orchard to the Ralph E. Brock Seed Orchard to mark the forester's 120th birthday. On Arbor Day in 2001, the City of Pottsville planted a tree in his honor at the historic Charles Baber Cemetery. In 2003, the Pennsylvania Historical and Museum Commission commemorated his accomplishments with a historic marker at the entrance to the Penn State Mont Alto campus. In the mid-2000s, the State Museum of Pennsylvania installed an exhibit in the museum's Ecology Hall showcasing Brock's career at Mont Alto.
