= Fairview, Franklin County, Pennsylvania =

Unincorporated community in Pennsylvania, U.S.

Coordinates: 39°47′59″N 77°33′18″W

Fairview is an unincorporated community in Quincy Township, Franklin County, Pennsylvania, United States.

== History ==
Historian I. H. McCauley, in his 1878 work Historical Sketch of Franklin County, noted that the community of Fairview had been planned out by William G. McClellan, Esq. circa 1853, was located "at the point where the road from Shippensburg to Roxbury crosses the Conodoguinet creek," and had a population of 90 as the 1870s waned.
