= Five Forks, North Carolina =

Five Forks, North Carolina may refer to:

- Five Forks, Person County, North Carolina, an unincorporated community in North Carolina
- Five Forks, Robeson County, North Carolina, an unincorporated community
- King, North Carolina (formerly called Five Forks) a city in Stokes and Forsyth counties

== See also ==
- Five Forks (disambiguation)
