= McVeytown, Pennsylvania =

Borough in Pennsylvania, US

- Borough
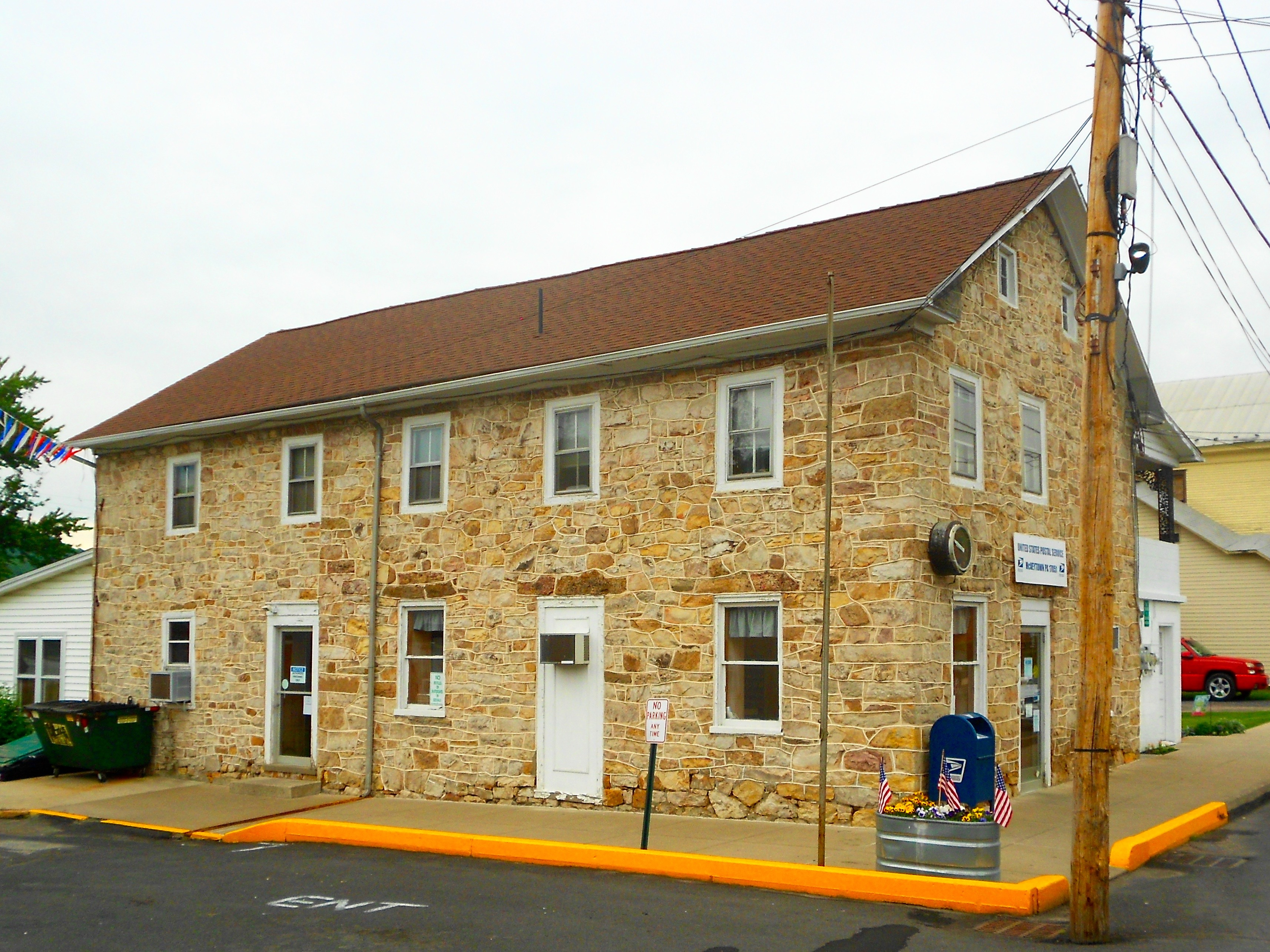
- Post office

- Location of McVeytown in Mifflin County, Pennsylvania.

- Location within Pennsylvania Location within the United States
- Coordinates: 40°29′51″N 77°44′27″W
- Country: United States
- State: Pennsylvania
- County: Mifflin
- Settled: 1762
- Laid out: 1795
- Incorporated: 1833

Government
  - Type: Borough Council
  - Mayor: Wilda Fisher
  - Council President: Steve Feathers
  - Council Vice President: Roland Fagan

Area
  - Total: 0.11 sq mi (0.28 km^{2})
  - Land: 0.097 sq mi (0.25 km^{2})
  - Water: 0.012 sq mi (0.03 km^{2})

Population (2020)
  - Total: 344
  - Density: 3,603.9/sq mi (1,391.46/km^{2})
- Time zone: UTC-5 (Eastern (EST))
  - Summer (DST): UTC-4 (EDT)
- Zip code: 17051
- Area code: 717
- FIPS code: 42-46400
- Website: McVeytown
- Local phone exchange: 899

McVeytown is a borough in Mifflin County, Pennsylvania, United States, on the west bank of the Juniata River. Formerly known as Waynesburg, it was settled in 1762, laid out in 1795, and incorporated in 1833. The population was 344 at the 2020 census. The "Father of Pennsylvania Forestry", Dr. Joseph Rothrock was born in McVeytown on April 9, 1839. He was largely responsible for the acquisition of the lands that became Pennsylvania state parks and forests, including Rothrock State Forest.

== History ==
The settlement of what is now McVeytown was begun by Samuel Holliday in 1755, but it was only in 1762 that he settled in permanently and not until 1795 that the town of Waynesburg (present day McVeytown) was laid out. John McVey owned the land and was the founder of McVeytown.

Samuel, Adam, John and William Holliday, and his two sisters, Elizabeth and Nancy, the latter of whom would become the wife of Andrew Bratton, immigrated to the U.S. in 1745 and located on the “manor” of Lancaster County. They moved later to Conococheague in what is now Franklin County, and John removed to Path Valley, where he lived and died. Adam and William took up land at Hollidaysburg, and it was from him that the borough took its name. In early 1775, Samuel Holliday and Andrew Bratton, just after the New Purchase of the Indians, went out into that region in search for land to settle. After they made a decision on the land, they went to the land-office, at the time located in Philadelphia, and in 1775 received their warrants. Bratton was in what is now Bratton Township, and Holliday at what is now McVeytown and vicinity.

== Geography ==
McVeytown is located at 40°29′51″N 77°44′27″W (40.497584, -77.740796). The unincorporated settlement Mattawana Village lies across the Juniata River, on its east bank.

According to the United States Census Bureau, the borough has a total area of 0.1 square miles (0.26 km^{2}), of which 0.1 square miles (0.26 km^{2}) is land and 10.00% is water.

== Demographics ==
Historical population
Census	Pop.	Note	%±
1840	348		—
1850	580		66.7%
1860	541		−6.7%
1870	685		26.6%
1880	679		−0.9%
1890	599		−11.8%
1900	520		−13.2%
1910	514		−1.2%
1920	480		−6.6%
1930	566		17.9%
1940	581		2.7%
1950	546		−6.0%
1960	488		−10.6%
1970	486		−0.4%
1980	447		−8.0%
1990	408		−8.7%
2000	405		−0.7%
2010	342		−15.6%
2020	344		0.6%
2021 (est.)	342	▼	−0.6%

As of the census of 2000, there were 305 people, 168 households, and 115 families residing in the borough. The population density was 4,379.9 inhabitants per square mile (1,691.1/km^{2}). There were 182 housing units at an average density of 1,968.2 per square mile (759.9/km^{2}). The racial makeup of the borough was 99.26% White, 0.25% African American, and 0.49% from two or more races. Hispanic or Latino of any race were 0.25% of the population.

There were 168 households, out of which 29.2% had children under the age of 18 living with them, 53.6% were married couples living together, 11.3% had a female householder with no husband present, and 31.0% were non-families. 28.6% of all households were made up of individuals, and 18.5% had someone living alone who was 65 years of age or older. The average household size was 2.41 and the average family size was 2.91.

In the borough the population was spread out, with 21.7% under the age of 18, 5.4% from 18 to 24, 28.9% from 25 to 44, 18.8% from 45 to 64, and 25.2% who were 65 years of age or older. The median age was 41 years. For every 100 females there were 88.4 males. For every 100 females age 18 and over, there were 85.4 males.

The median income for a household in the borough was $32,500, and the median income for a family was $41,250. Males had a median income of $28,571 versus $19,286 for females. The per capita income for the borough was $16,116. About 3.5% of families and 6.5% of the population were below the poverty line, including 2.5% of those under age 18 and 7.6% of those age 65 or over.

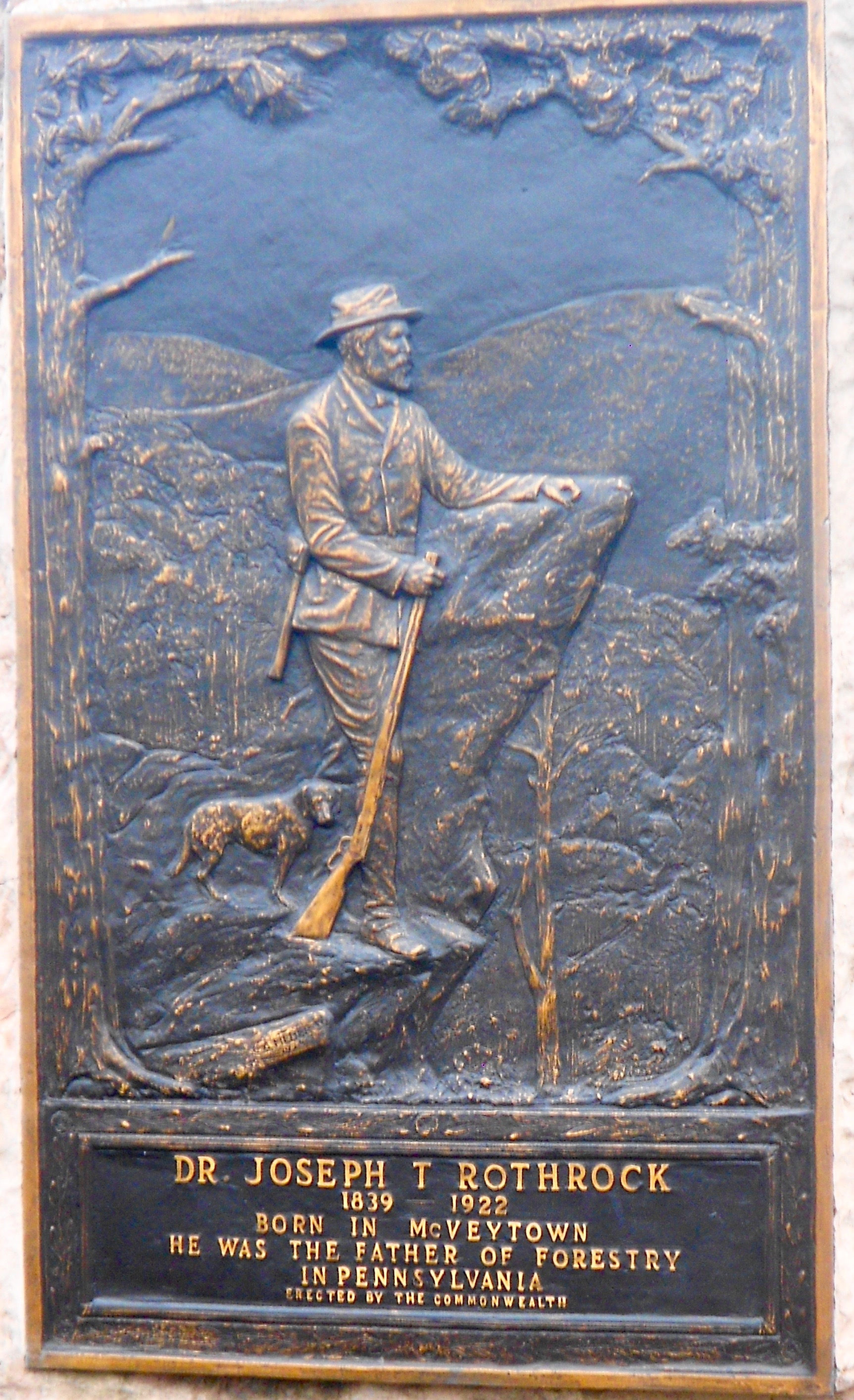
Rothrock plaque

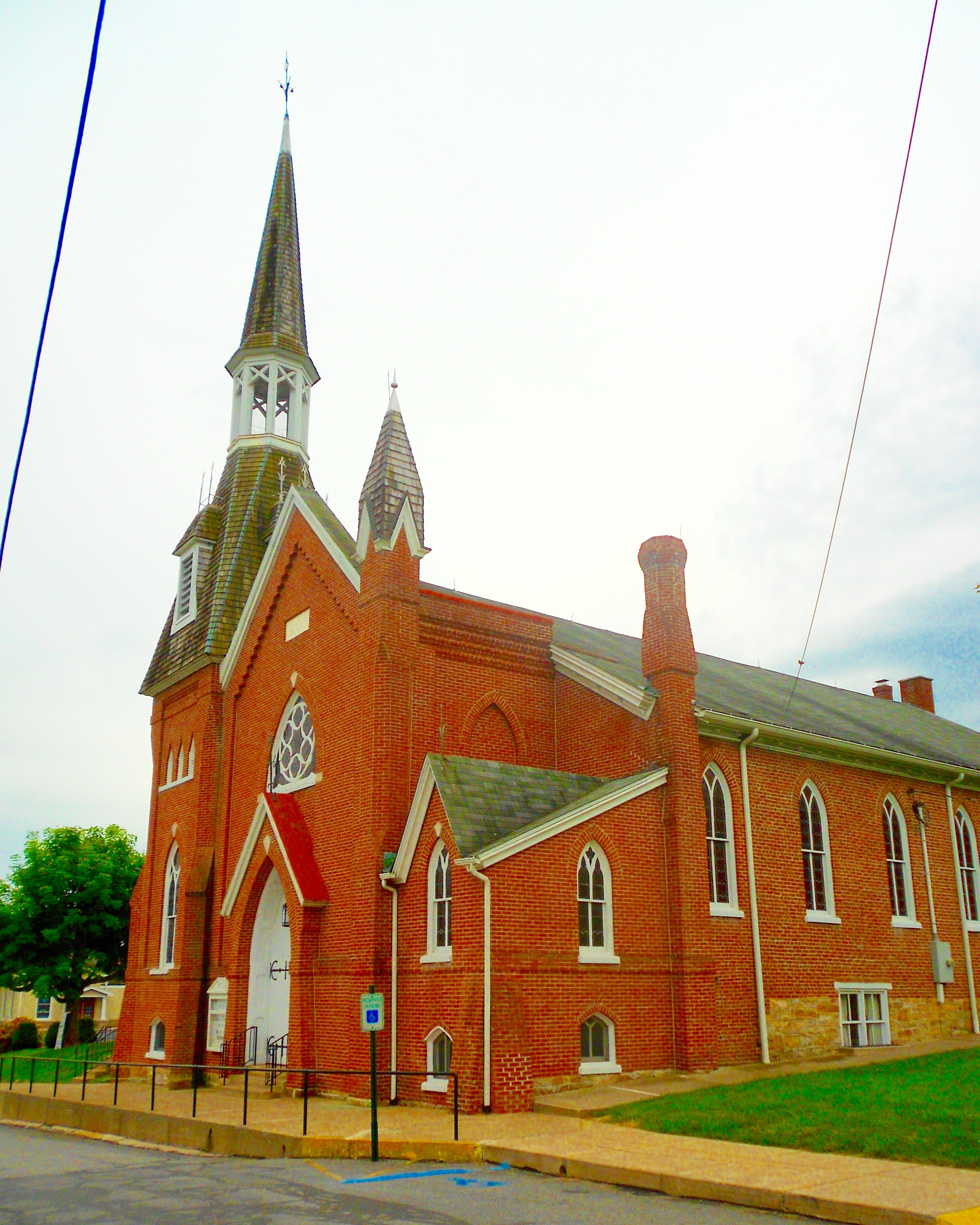
Presbyterian Church

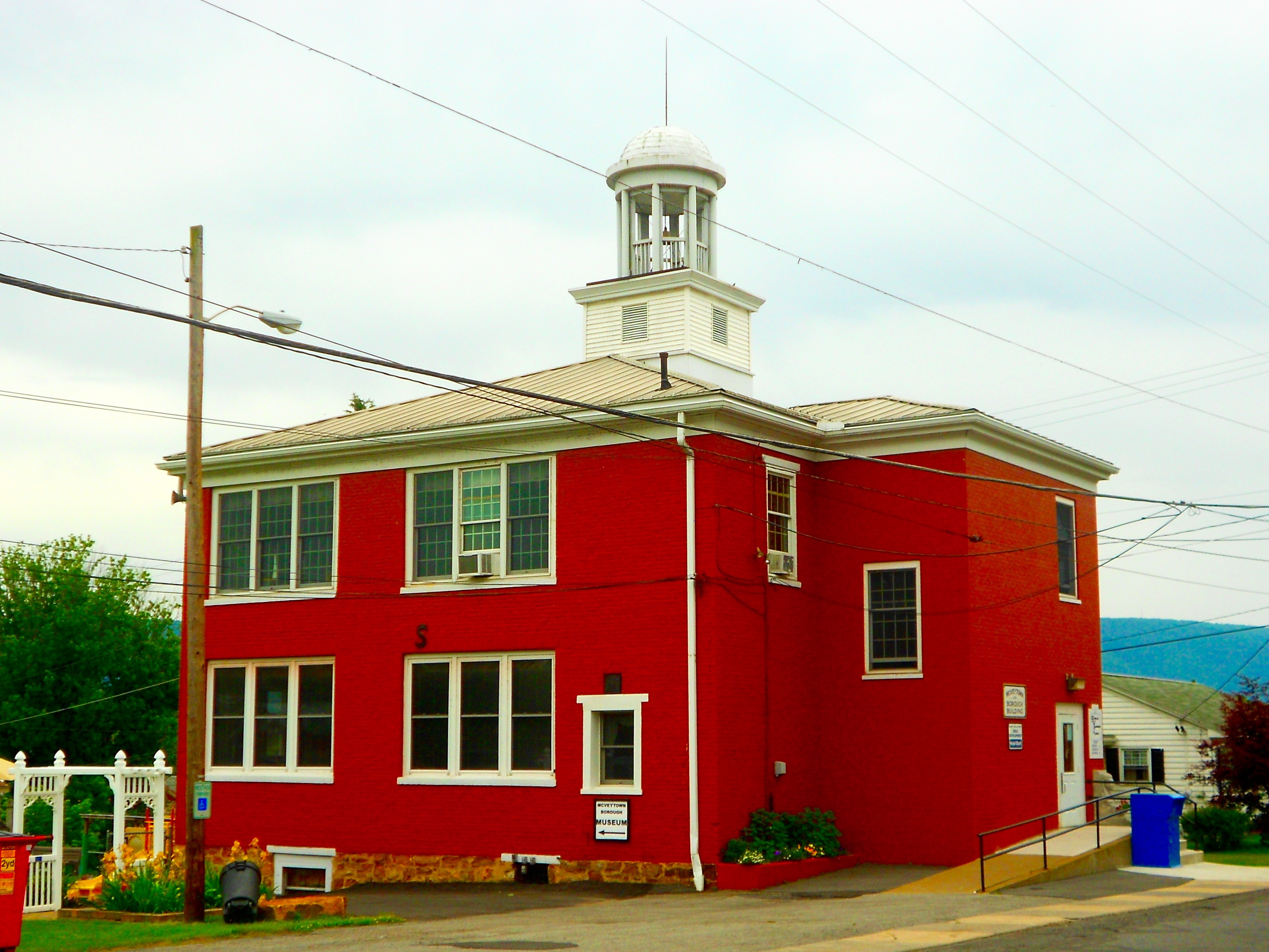
Borough Hall
