= Five Forks, West Virginia =

Five Forks, West Virginia may refer to:

- Five Forks, Calhoun County, West Virginia, an unincorporated community
- Five Forks, Ritchie County, West Virginia, an unincorporated community
- Five Forks, Upshur County, West Virginia, an unincorporated community
