= Beartown Woods Natural Area =

Natural area in Pennsylvania

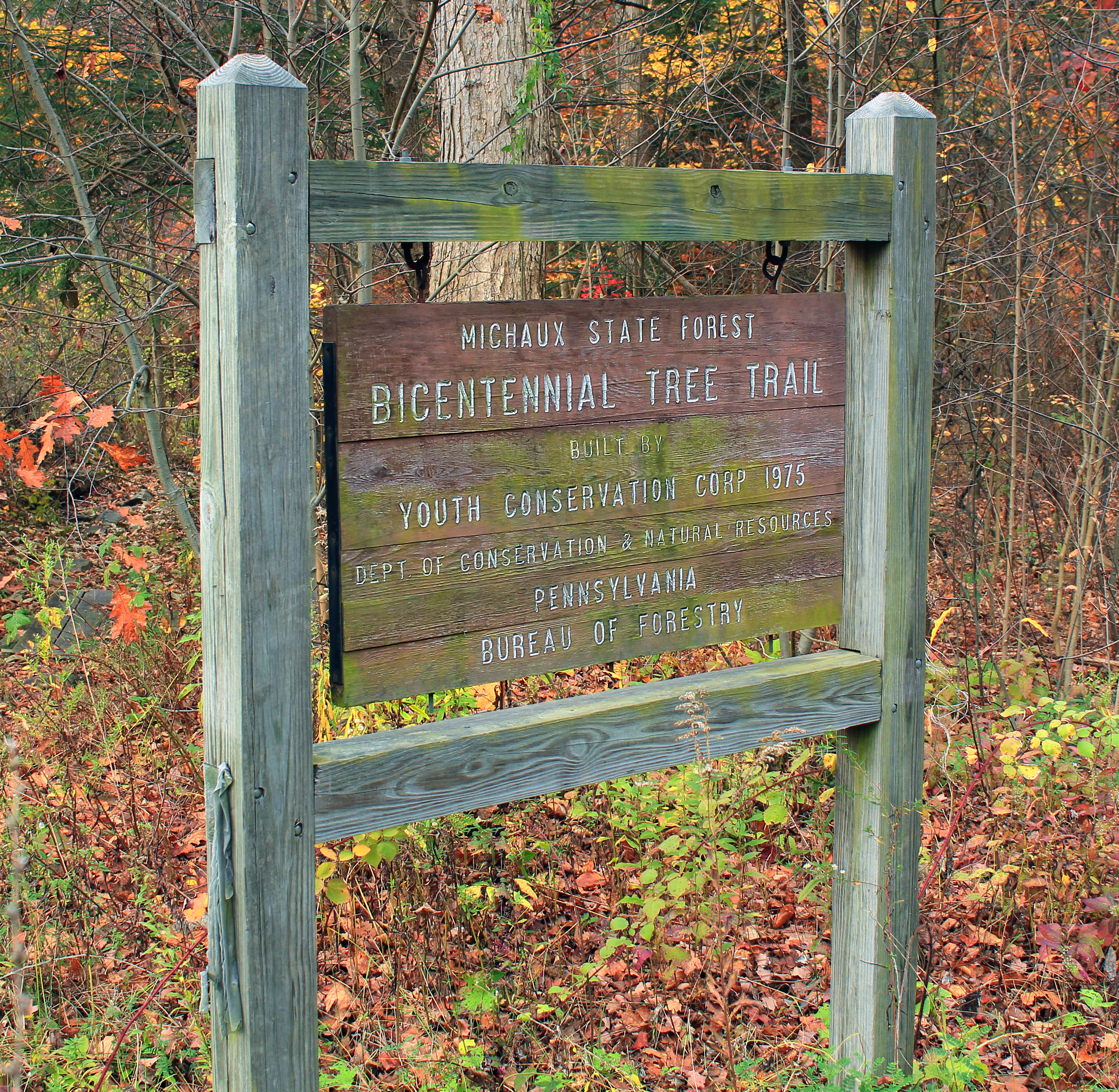
- The Bicentennial Tree Trail visits the old growth trees in Beartown Woods Natural Area

- Location within Pennsylvania
- Location: Franklin County, Pennsylvania
- Nearest town: Blue Ridge Summit
- Coordinates: 39°44′28″N 77°29′25″W
- Area: 27 acres (11 ha)

Beartown Woods Natural Area is a 27-acre (11 ha) protected area in Franklin County, Pennsylvania, United States, that is part of Michaux State Forest.

== Description ==
The Natural Area protects a grove of northern hardwood forest that is uncommon for the southern edge of Pennsylvania and more likely to be seen in New York State and New England. The grove includes sugar maple, yellow birch, American beech, and eastern hemlock trees, some of which are old growth.

Beartown Woods is found at the side of PA 16 and is traversed by the Appalachian Trail. The area includes several educational displays on local forest ecology.
