= Old Forge, Franklin County, Pennsylvania =

Unincorporated community in Pennsylvania, U.S.

Old Forge is an unincorporated community in Quincy Township, Franklin County, Pennsylvania, United States, within the Michaux State Forest, at 39°47′40″N 77°29′3″W (39.7945378, -77.4841559), at altitude of 892 feet (272 m).
