= Israel Benevolent Society Cemetery =

Jewish cemetery in Pennsylvania, USA

Coordinates: 39.934°N 77.655°W

Hebrew and English epitaphs

The Israel Benevolent Society Cemetery also known as the Old Jewish Cemetery of Chambersburg, Pennsylvania is believed to be the earliest Jewish American burial ground west of the Susquehanna River.

== History ==
The oldest headstone refers to a burial in July 1840. At that time only a handful of Jewish families, mostly recent immigrants from Germany, lived in the small towns and villages of south-central Pennsylvania and adjoining counties of Maryland.

As there was no organized Jewish community life anywhere in the area until late in the 19th century, the Jewish burial society (Chevra kadisha), which administered the Chambersburg cemetery, was the main organizational structure of the Jewish minority in south-central Pennsylvania and northern Maryland. Among those who buried their dead in the Jewish cemetery in Chambersburg were the Jewish inhabitants of Hagerstown, Carlisle, and Mechanicsburg.

Isaac Burgauer, a Confederate soldier from Arkansas, who was wounded at the Battle of Gettysburg and died soon after in Hagerstown, is buried here.

Around 1900 the burial society dissolved, and the cemetery fell into disrepair and dilapidation. It was restored in 1988, and again in 2000.

In 2002, the Pennsylvania Historical & Museum Commission erected a historical marker there, noting its historic importance.
