= Five Forks, Ritchie County, West Virginia =

Unincorporated community in West Virginia, United States

Five Forks
- Unincorporated community
- Location within the state of West Virginia Five Forks (the United States)
- Coordinates: 39°10′35″N 80°58′42″W
- Country: United States
- State: West Virginia
- County: Ritchie
- Elevation: 1,079 ft (329 m)
- Time zone: UTC-5 (Eastern (EST))
  - Summer (DST): UTC-4 (EDT)
- GNIS ID: 1554462

Five Forks is an unincorporated community in Ritchie County, West Virginia, United States.
