= Quincy, Pennsylvania =

Unincorporated community in Pennsylvania, US

- Unincorporated community
- Location within Pennsylvania
- Coordinates: 39°48′12″N 77°34′28″W
- Country: United States
- State: Pennsylvania
- County: Franklin
- Elevation: 709 ft (216 m)
- Time zone: UTC-5 (Eastern (EST))
  - Summer (DST): UTC-4 (EDT)
- ZIP code: 17247
- Area codes: 223 & 717
- GNIS feature ID: 1184560

Quincy is an unincorporated community in Quincy Township in southeastern Franklin County, in the U.S. state of Pennsylvania.

== History ==
A post office has been in operation at Quincy since 1830. Quincy originally was built up chiefly by Germans.
