= Five Forks, Franklin County, Pennsylvania =

Unincorporated community in Pennsylvania, U.S.

Coordinates: 39°48′05″N 77°36′31″W

Five Forks is an unincorporated community in Quincy Township in southeastern Franklin County, in the U.S. state of Pennsylvania.

== History ==
An early variant name was "Mount Hope". A post office called Five Forks was established in 1873, the name was changed to Fiveforks in 1895, and the post office closed in 1909. Beside the post office, the community had a gristmill and a country store.
