= Mont Alto, Pennsylvania =

Borough in Pennsylvania, US

- Borough
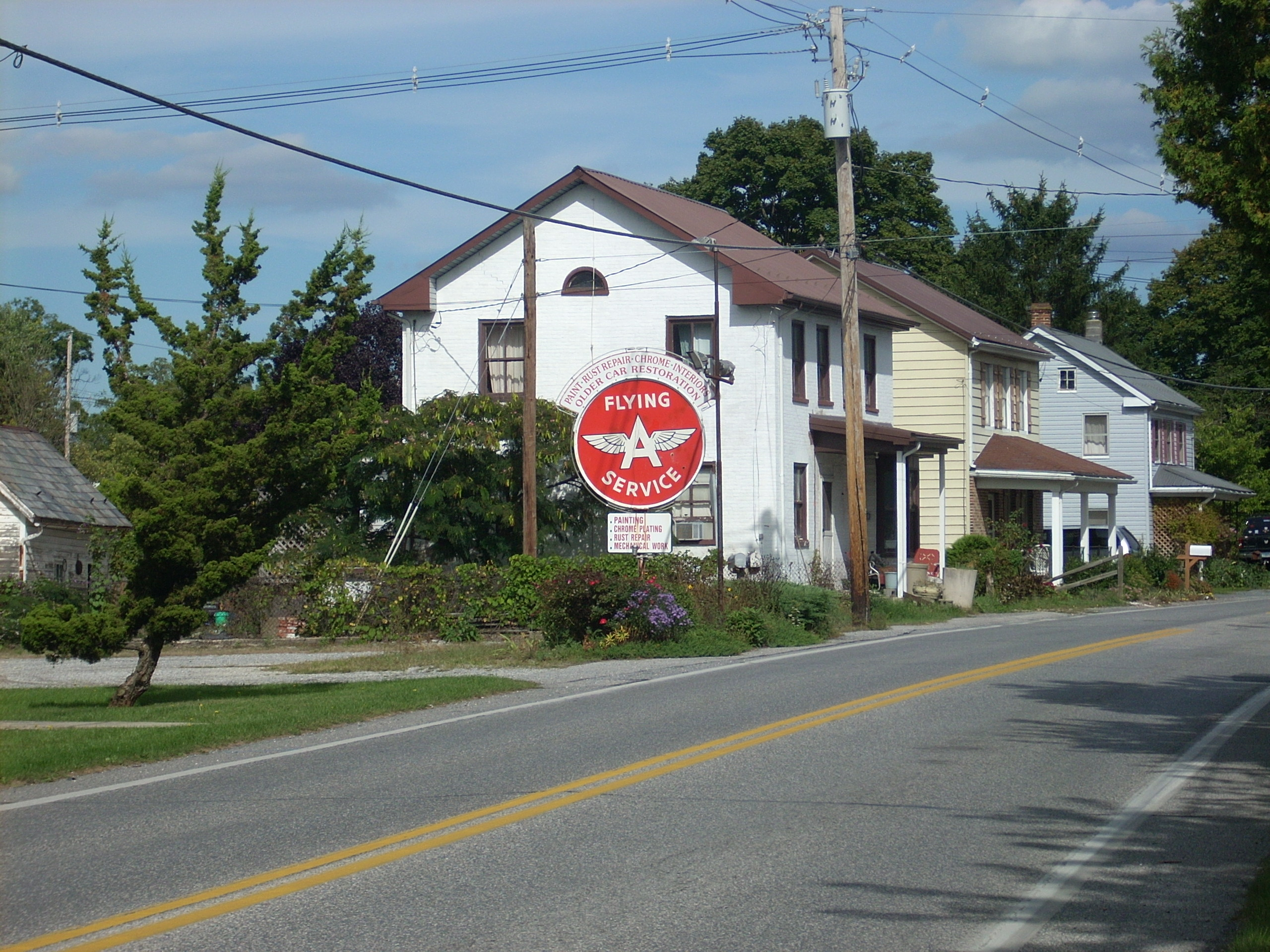
- Mont Alto, Pennsylvania

- Location of Mont Alto in Franklin County, Pennsylvania.

- Location within Pennsylvania Location within the United States
- Coordinates: 39°50′25″N 77°33′21″W
- Country: United States
- State: Pennsylvania
- County: Franklin
- Settled: 1762
- Incorporated: 1915

Government
  - Type: Borough Council
  - Mayor: John Esser

Area
  - Total: 0.56 sq mi (1.46 km^{2})
  - Land: 0.56 sq mi (1.46 km^{2})
  - Water: 0 sq mi (0.00 km^{2})
- Elevation: 876 ft (267 m)

Population (2020)
  - Total: 1,580
  - Density: 2,808.2/sq mi (1,084.24/km^{2})
- Time zone: UTC-5 (Eastern (EST))
  - Summer (DST): UTC-4 (EDT)
- ZIP code: 17237
- Area code: 717
- FIPS code: 42-50544
- GNIS feature ID: 1215246
- Website: www.montaltoborough.com

Mont Alto is a borough in Franklin County, Pennsylvania, United States. The population was 1,580 at the 2020 census.

== History ==
John Funk built the first house in the borough (then unestablished) in 1817 on what is now Main Street. At this time the town was known as "Funkstown". Eventually the town of Altodale and the surrounding area, called Mont Alto, combined into what is now known as Mont Alto.

In 1915 the town of Mont Alto was incorporated with a population of 800.

In the beginning of the 20th century, Mont Alto contained one of the largest sanatoriums in the area for treatment of tuberculosis.

== Geography ==
Mont Alto is located in southeastern Franklin County at 39°50′36″N 77°33′18″W (39.843234, -77.555023). It sits at the western base of South Mountain along the headwaters of the West Branch of Antietam Creek. Mont Alto State Park is located in the creek valley, 1 mile (1.6 km) east of the borough.

Pennsylvania Route 997 passes through the center of town as Main Street; it leads north 5 miles (8 km) to U.S. Route 30 near Fayetteville and south 7 miles (11 km) to Waynesboro. Pennsylvania Route 233 runs east out of the borough as Park Street, leading northeast 9 miles (14 km) to US 30 at Caledonia State Park.

According to the U.S. Census Bureau, the borough has a total area of 0.57 square miles (1.47 km^{2}), all land.

== Demographics ==
Historical population
Census	Pop.	Note	%±
1890	658		—
1920	589		—
1930	606		2.9%
1940	661		9.1%
1950	984		48.9%
1960	1,039		5.6%
1970	1,532		47.4%
1980	1,592		3.9%
1990	1,395		−12.4%
2000	1,357		−2.7%
2010	1,705		25.6%
2020	1,580		−7.3%

As of the census, of 2000, there were 1,357 people, 541 households, and 413 families residing in the borough. The population density was 2,339.5 inhabitants per square mile (903.3/km^{2}). There were 576 housing units at an average density of 993.1 per square mile (383.4/km^{2}). The racial makeup of the borough was 97.72% White, 0.96% African American, 0.15% Native American, 0.81% Asian, 0.07% from other races, and 0.29% from two or more races. Hispanic or Latino of any race were 0.22% of the population.

There were 541 households, out of which 33.6% had children under the age of 18 living with them, 63.4% were married couples living together, 10.4% had a female householder with no husband present, and 23.5% were non-families. 20.1% of all households were made up of individuals, and 8.9% had someone living alone who was 65 years of age or older. The average household size was 2.51 and the average family size was 2.87.

In the borough, the population was spread out, with 24.2% under the age of 18, 6.7% from 18 to 24, 33.8% from 25 to 44, 22.4% from 45 to 64, and 12.9% who were 65 years of age or older. The median age was 36 years. For every 100 females there were 95.8 males. For every 100 females age 18 and over, there were 91.1 males.

The median income for a household in the borough was $37,163, and the median income for a family was $41,705. Males had a median income of $32,169 versus $21,579 for females. The per capita income for the borough was $17,216. About 4.0% of families and 4.7% of the population were below the poverty line, including 5.9% of those under age 18 and 6.1% of those age 65 or over.

== Colleges and universities ==
Penn State Mont Alto is located at the intersection of Slabtown Road and Campus Drive; Route 233 passes by the university.

== Points of interest ==
- Mont Alto Arboretum, on the campus of Penn State Mont Alto
- Mont Alto State Park
- Mont Alto Railroad
