= Joseph Rothrock =

U.S. botanist. mycologist, lichenologist & conservationist (1839–1922)

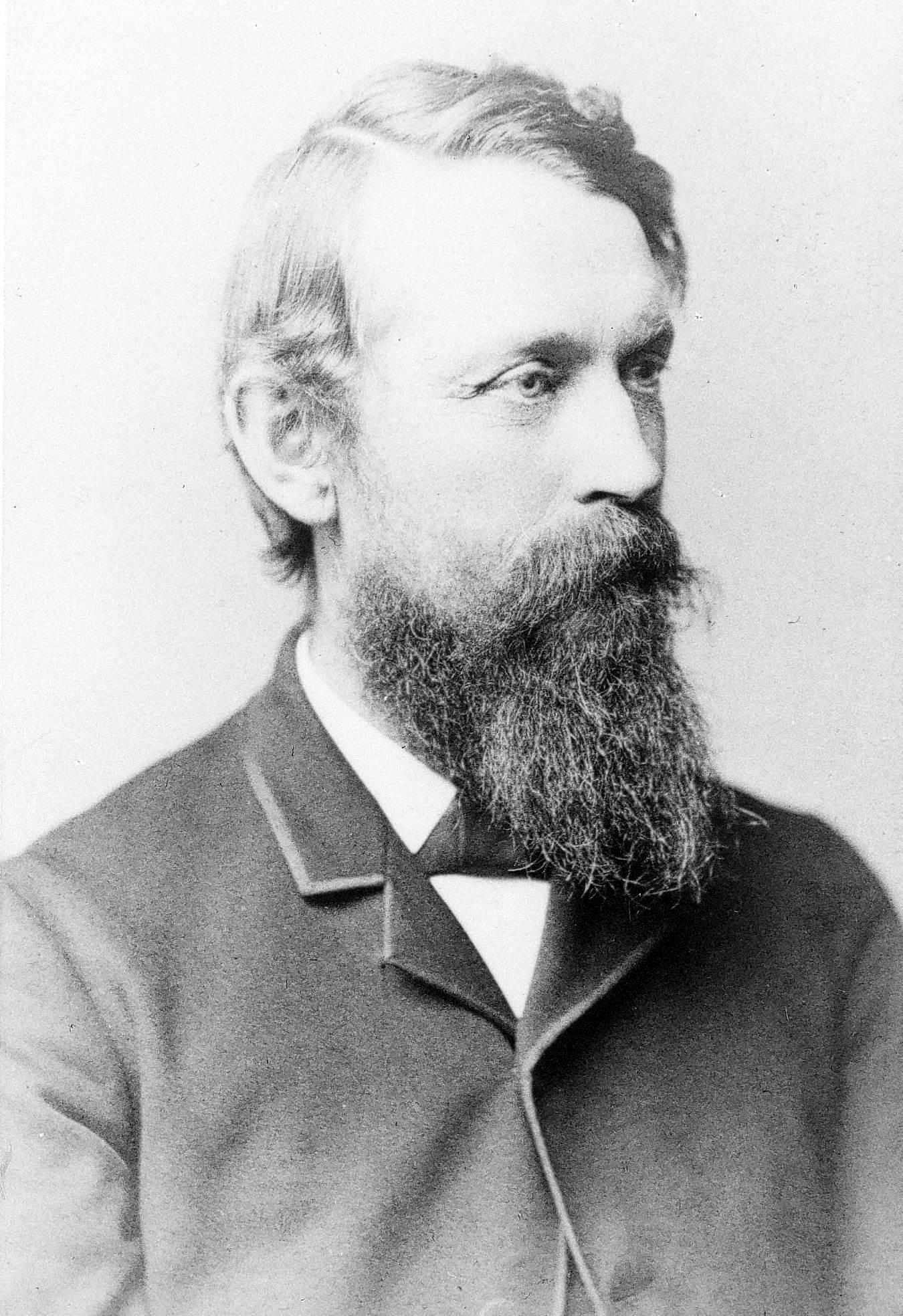

Commissioner of the Pennsylvania Department of Forests and Waters
- In office 1895–1904

President of the Pennsylvania Forestry Association

Personal details
- Born: Joseph Trimble Rothrock; April 9, 1839 McVeytown, Pennsylvania, U.S.
- Died: June 2, 1922 (aged 83) West Chester, Pennsylvania, U.S.
- Resting place: Oaklands Cemetery; West Chester, Pennsylvania, U.S.
- Party: Republican
- Profession: Explorer; surgeon; botanist; professor

Joseph Trimble Rothrock (April 9, 1839 – June 2, 1922) was an American environmentalist, recognized as the "Father of Forestry" in Pennsylvania. In 1895, Rothrock was appointed the first forestry commissioner to lead the newly formed Division of Forestry in the Pennsylvania Department of Agriculture. Two of his major accomplishments as commissioner were his land acquisition program and the creation of a forest academy to train foresters for state service.

== Biography ==
=== Early life ===
Joseph Rothrock was born in McVeytown in Mifflin County, Pennsylvania in the United States to a German farming family. He was often ill as a child and spent many hours hiking the woods of Mifflin County for exercise to combat his illnesses. It was while on these walks that Rothrock developed a love for the outdoors. He went on to become a pioneering environmentalist in Pennsylvania, helping preserve and re-establish the forests that he so loved.

=== Education and early career ===
Joseph Rothrock studied under Asa Gray, a renowned botanist at Harvard University. Rothrock received a Bachelor of Science in botany from Harvard in 1862 (possibly 1864). He enlisted in the Union Army the following year, saw action during the American Civil War and was seriously wounded at the Battle of Fredericksburg. Rothrock was discharged from the Army on June 6, 1864, having reached the rank of captain in the 20th Pennsylvania Cavalry. He furthered his education at the University of Pennsylvania, receiving a doctor of medicine degree in 1867.

Rothrock began practice in Centre County, Pennsylvania, but in 1870 moved to Wilkes-Barre, making a specialty of diseases of the eye and ear. He was one of the founders of Wilkes-Barre Hospital, and served on the faculty of Penn State University from 1867 to 1869, where he taught botany, human anatomy and physiology.

Rothrock was associated with the exploring party of the Western Union extension telegraph in British Columbia 1865–1866. He served as a surgeon and botanist for the geographical and geological exploration and survey west of the 100th meridian under Lieut. George M. Wheeler, the Wheeler Survey, 1873–1875. In 1876, he established the North Mountain School of Physical Culture in Luzerne County, also during the same year he was appointed by the American Philosophical Society lecturer on forestry in execution of the Michaux legacy. He studied botany in Alsace at the University of Strassburg in 1880. It was while Rothrock was in Europe that he began to study forest management, which led him to be a pioneer in forest management in Pennsylvania and the United States.

=== Later career ===
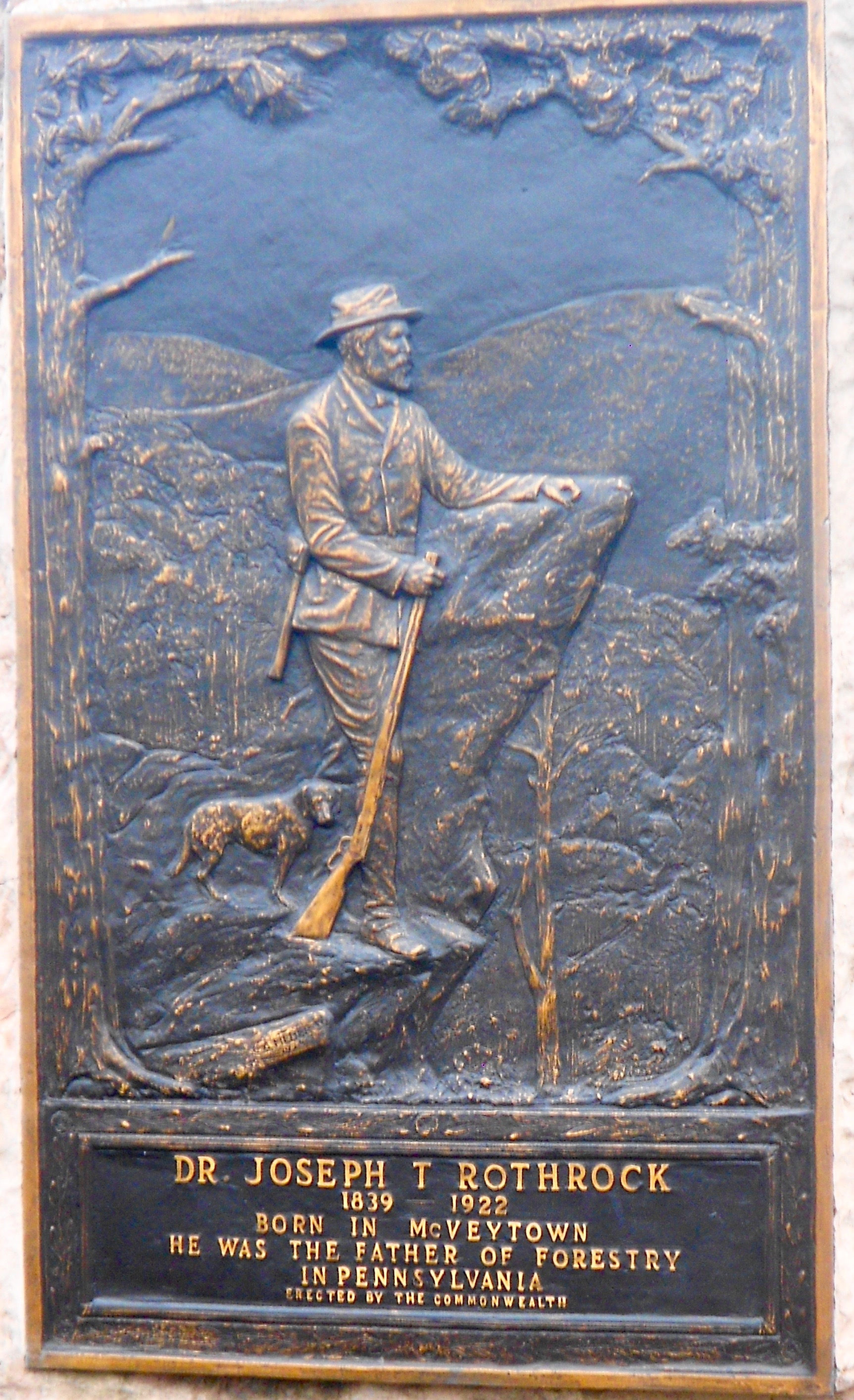
Plaque in McVeytown, Pennsylvania dedicated in 1924 to Rothrock

Rothrock served as the first president of the Pennsylvania Forestry Association (PFA) in 1886. The PFA sought promote conservation and support the creation of state parks and state forests in Pennsylvania. Rothrock was a member of the PFA for most of the rest of his life. He used it as a pulpit to "incite the interest of people throughout the state on forestry—to preserve, protect and propagate the forest."

Rothrock was appointed Commissioner of Forestry in Pennsylvania in 1895. He led the drive to purchase land from lumber companies to create many of the state forests that are spread throughout Pennsylvania. Rothrock used his medical expertise to open a sanatorium at what is now Mont Alto State Park. The sanatorium treated those afflicted with tuberculosis and other respiratory illnesses. He also opened the Pennsylvania State Forestry Academy, now Penn State Mont Alto, in 1903 under the authorization of Pennsylvania Governor, Samuel W. Pennypacker. He arranged for Ralph E. Brock to attend the academy and become the first African American forester in the United States. Rothrock resigned as Commissioner of Forestry in 1904, but continued to serve on the commission until 1914.

== Legacy ==
Joseph Trimble Rothrock died in 1922 at West Chester, Pennsylvania and was interred at Oaklands Cemetery. He left behind a legacy of environmental restoration and conservation. In his position as Pennsylvania Commissioner of Forestry he was able to begin the process of acquiring land for the creation of the many state forests and parks that now dot Pennsylvania's landscape. As a voice for environmental protection, he inspired succeeding generations to conserve and manage the use of Pennsylvania's extensive forests. Rothrock pioneered the treatment of tuberculosis in sanatoriums, established a hospital in Wilkes-Barre and helped explore the Canadian frontier.

In a speech given in 1915, Rothrock recalled the forests of his youth: "Sixty years ago I walked from Clearfield to St. Marys; thence to Smethport— 60 miles; most of the way through glorious white pine and hemlock forests. Now these forests are gone." In describing the forest conditions of 1915 he said, "6,400 square miles; more than 4 million acres [16,000 km²] of the state are desolated, cut and unprotected from fire." Rothrock compared Pennsylvania's situation to similar forest destruction in China. He worried that "unless we reforest, Pennsylvania's highlands will wash into the oceans." Because of men like Joseph Rothrock, Jacob Nolde, Maurice Goddard and Gifford Pinchot, Pennsylvania has thriving second-growth forests that have recovered from the ravages of the lumber era that swept across its hills and valleys in the late nineteenth century.

== Works ==
- Flora of Alaska (1867)
- Botany of the Wheeler Expedition (1878)
- Vacation Cruisings (1884)
- Pennsylvania Forest Reports (1895–97)
