= Tomstown, Pennsylvania =

Unincorporated community in Pennsylvania, U.S.

Coordinates: 39°47′34″N 77°33′42″W

Tomstown is an unincorporated community in Quincy Township in southeastern Franklin County, in the U.S. state of Pennsylvania.

== History ==
A post office called Tomstown was established in 1892, and remained in operation until 1901. The community was named after John Toms, a first settler. A variant name is "Toms Town".
