= Mont Alto State Park =

State park in Pennsylvania, United States

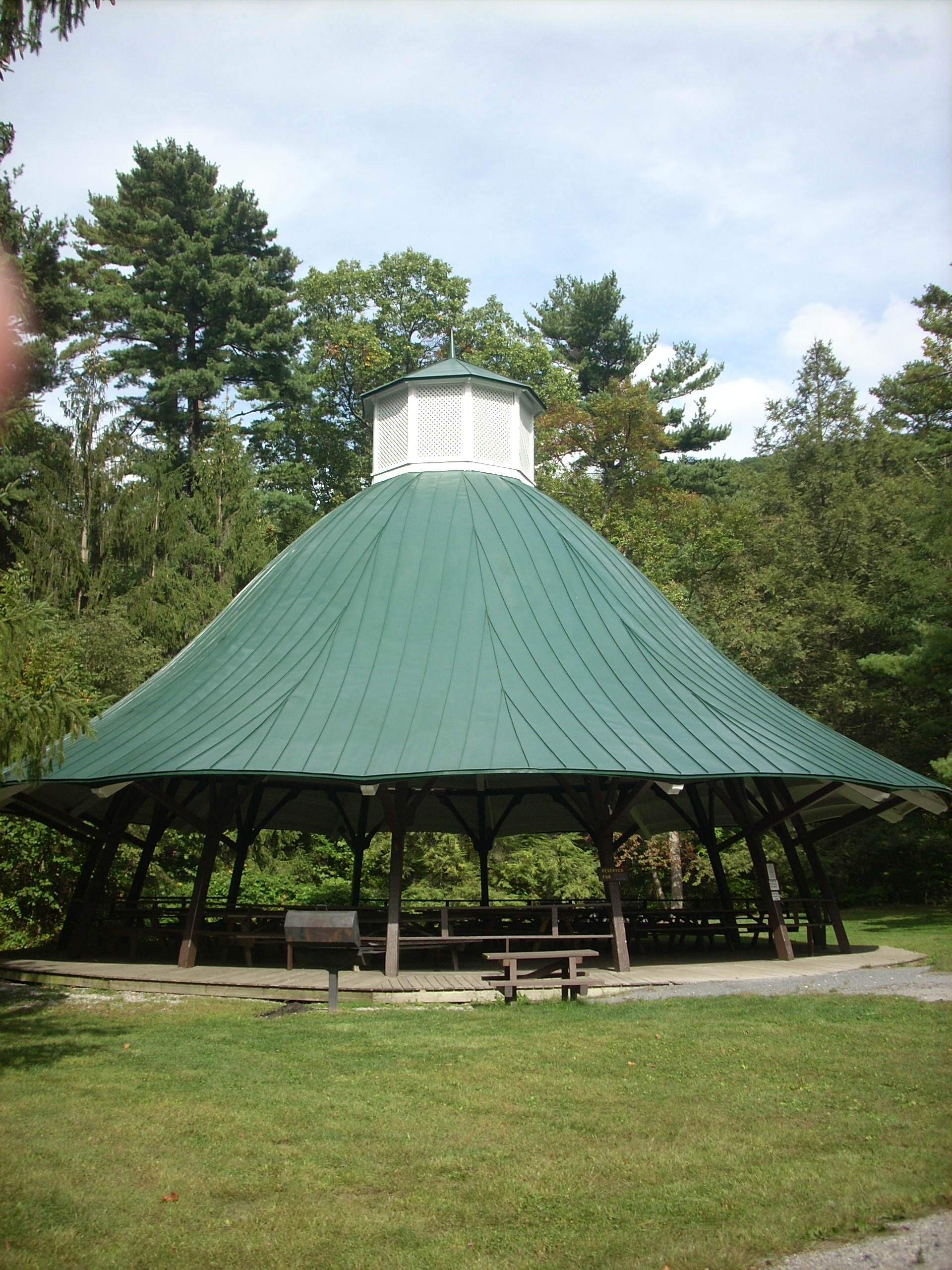

- Location within Pennsylvania Location within the United States
- Interactive map of Mont Alto State Park
- Location: Franklin County, Pennsylvania, United States
- Coordinates: 39°50′20″N 77°32′14″W
- Area: 24 acres (9.7 ha)
- Elevation: 1,086 feet (331 m)
- Established: 1902
- Administrator: Pennsylvania Department of Conservation and Natural Resources
- Website: Official website
- Pennsylvania State Parks

Mont Alto State Park is a Pennsylvania state park on 24 acres (9.7 ha) in Quincy Township, Franklin County, Pennsylvania in the United States. The park is on Pennsylvania Route 233 one mile from Mont Alto.

== History ==
=== Mont Alto Iron Company ===
Mont Alto State Park is the oldest state park in Pennsylvania. Its history began with the former Mont Alto Iron Furnace, a blast furnace built in 1807. It was 31 feet (9.4 m) high and 8 feet (2.4 m) wide at the boshes. The furnace produced between 2 and 3 short tons (1.8 and 2.7 t) of iron a day. The area was a center of iron production for many years. The Mont Alto Railroad was built by the Mont Alto Iron Company to connect the furnaces of the area to the Cumberland Valley Railroad near Chambersburg. This railroad served a dual purpose, carrying iron shipments from the furnace and bringing visitors to Mont Alto Park. The park was opened by the Mont Alto Iron Company. Ownership of Mont Alto Park was transferred to the Commonwealth of Pennsylvania on May 1, 1902.

=== The First State Park ===
Mont Alto Park became the first "state forest park" in Pennsylvania. The park had a swimming pool, refreshment stand, hiking trails and a carousel. It was also the site of South Mountain Camp Sanitorium. This sanitorium was founded by Dr. Joseph Rothrock, a medical doctor and forester who opened several sanitoriums in the forests of Pennsylvania and became known as the father of forestry in Pennsylvania. The sanitorium treated those afflicted with tuberculosis and other respiratory illnesses. Over the years the park has gradually become less and less of a destination for visitors. It is now a quiet park with minimal facilities. The building that housed the carousel, which now serves as a picnic pavilion, is a reminder of the past.

== Recreation ==
The West Branch Antietam Creek flows through Mont Alto State Park and provides visitors to the park to fish for trout. Logging and forest management roads provide access to hiking opportunities in the nearby Michaux State Forest. There are two picnic areas with approximately 50 tables and two pavilions, one being the former carousel house. The park also provides parking and restroom facilities for hunters and other outdoorsman that venture into Michaux State Forest.
