= Five Forks, Virginia =

Five Forks is the name of several populated places in the U.S. state of Virginia.

- Five Forks, Dinwiddie County, Virginia
- Five Forks, Fairfax County, Virginia
