= Penn State Mont Alto =

Public university to Mont Alto, Pennsylvania, US

- Former name: Pennsylvania State Forest Academy
- Type: Public satellite campus
- Established: 1903
- Parent institution: Pennsylvania State University
- Affiliations: PSUAC (USCAA)
- Chancellor: Marilyn Wells
- President: Neeli Bendapudi
- Students: 587 (Fall 2025)
- Undergraduates: 586 (Fall 2025)
- Postgraduates: 1 (Fall 2025)
- Location: Mont Alto, Pennsylvania, U.S.
- Campus: Rural area
- Nickname: Nittany Lions
- Website: montalto.psu.edu/

Penn State Mont Alto is a residential commonwealth campus of the Pennsylvania State University. Located in Mont Alto, Pennsylvania, the campus offers nine four-year and seven two-year degree programs, including nursing, forest technology, occupational therapy assistant, physical therapist assistant, business, information technology, and project and supply chain management.

In 2021, 672 students were enrolled at the campus. In May 2025, the Board of Trustees of Pennsylvania State University announced the closure of seven of its twenty regional Commonwealth campuses after the Spring 2027 semester, including Penn State Mont Alto.

== History ==
=== Pennsylvania State Forest Academy ===
Joseph Rothrock, an explorer, botanist and medical doctor founded the academy to train men for service in the state forests. In May 1903, Samuel W. Pennypacker, governor of Pennsylvania, established the Pennsylvania State Forest Academy in Mont Alto. With the precipitous closure of the New York State College of Forestry at Cornell in the same month, the new Pennsylvania school became one of three forestry schools in the nation, along with Yale and Biltmore. George Wirt, the academy's first administrator, patterned the curriculum after curricula in Germany. All first year students were required to bring a horse with them to the academy until the late 1920s. The horses were used to fight forest fires in the Michaux State Forest. The nation's first academically trained African American forester, Ralph E. Brock, graduated from the academy in 1906 as a member of the first graduating class.

The yearbook of the Pennsylvania State Forest Academy was called "The Oak Leaf". It was published in 1914, 1920, 1923 and 1927, and may now be viewed online through the Pennsylvania State University Libraries along with other items documenting the history of this campus.

=== Merger with Penn State ===
In 1929 the Forest Academy merged with Pennsylvania State University, establishing Penn State Mont Alto. Students were adamantly opposed to the merger, and they protested by hanging two state officials in effigy.

The campus closed from 1943 to 1946 because the students and faculty were fighting in WWII.In 1963, Penn State Mont Alto became a Penn State campus. In 1997, Mont Alto joined the Commonwealth College, and began to offer baccalaureate degrees.

=== Closure ===
On May 22, 2025 the Board of Trustees of Pennsylvania State University announced the closure of seven of its twenty regional Commonwealth campuses, including Penn State Mont Alto. Enrollment had dropped to 613 students as of Fall 2024, a 51% decline from its peak and a drop of 35% in the past ten years. There were 4 other colleges within 30 miles (48 km) of the campus, which was the only Penn State campus slated for closure with on-campus housing. In Fall 2024, the occupancy rate for on-campus housing was 40%, lowest of all of the Penn State 12 campuses originally considered for closure. In fiscal 2024, financial losses for campus were $3.0 million, and the campus had $32.2 million in deferred maintenance (or $53,000 per student). Penn State Mont Alto will close after the Spring 2027 semester. Current students, faculty and staff will be offered support as the campus transitions to closure over a two-year period.

== Campus ==
Undergraduate demographics as of Fall 2023
Race and ethnicity	Total
White	78%
Hispanic	8%
Black	5%
Asian	4%
Two or more races	4%
International student	1%
Unknown	1%
Economic diversity
Low-income (Note: The percentage of students who received an income-based federal Pell grant intended for low-income students.)	28%
Affluent (Note: The percentage of students who are a part of the American middle class at the bare minimum.)	72%

=== Residence halls ===
Penn State Mont Alto offers two residence halls to students: Mont Alto Hall and Penn Gate II.

- Mont Alto Hall offers traditional dorm life. All three floors of the building are broken up into an east and a west side, with only one gender belonging to a particular wing. Each room holds two people, although it is possible to obtain a single room given certain circumstances. The rooms are not carpeted, and lack a central AC unit. They do however, include a heater. Each resident is provided with a desk, a phone jack, an Ethernet connection, a dresser, and a closet. The "Microfridge", a combination microwave and refrigerator, is standard as well. Every wing of the building includes a bathroom that the entire hall shares, making for two per floor. Mont Alto Hall also includes a basement with washers/dryers and study rooms. This hall is a mere 4-5 minute walk from virtually anything on campus, with the exception of the Penn Gate dorms and other parts of the campus east of PA 233 (softball fields, etc.).
- Penn Gate II offers four-person suite living. Similar to Mont Alto Hall, the building is three stories tall. While halls themselves are not gender specific, each individual suite is. The four-person suite includes two spacious bedrooms as well as a bathroom that is shared by all four people in the suite. Each room is carpeted and also includes a central air conditioning unit. Penn Gate II is located across Route 233 and is near the campus' baseball and softball fields.
- Penn Gate I, also located across Route 233 was built in the late 1960s and demolished in 2023 after remaining vacant for several years.

=== Classroom buildings ===
- Conklin Hall was originally built as a dormitory by students of the forestry school starting in 1909 and completed in 1911. The building is now home to the Student Center, Student Affairs offices and the archives.
- The General Studies Building is where the majority of classes at Penn State Mont Alto are held. The three-story brick building includes many traditional classrooms for lectures. The first floor holds an auditorium that is frequently used for special shows and speakers, as well as large lecture classes. In addition to the auditorium, the first floor holds the Learning Center, a place where students can go to study with a professional or student tutor. Several computer labs are held in the building as well.
- The Science and Technology building is primarily used for science courses at Penn State Mont Alto. In it, you will find several labs specific to different courses such as chemistry and nursing. Many general education courses are held in this building as well, particularly those with large class sizes. It was built in the 1970s.
- The Bookstore has a computer lab in the basement. Classes such as Computer Science and Management & Information Systems are typically held here.
- The Allied Health Building was opened in 2022 and is a learning hub for the campus' nursing, occupational therapy assistant, and physical therapist assistant programs. The new facility includes simulation laboratories and an ambulance port for the Nursing program, enhanced clinical lab space and equipment for the PTA program and a modern simulated living space for the OTA program.

=== Other notable buildings ===
- Wiestling Hall, located in the center of the campus mall, was built in 1807 and is the oldest building in the Penn State system outside of the Penn State University Park campus in State College, Pennsylvania. Originally built as an iron master's house it has served as the campus dining hall, classroom and dormitory. The second floor of Wiestling Hall is home to faculty and staff offices. The third floor of Wiestling has never been renovated, and remains true to the 1807 design. This third floor is only accessible through two hidden entranceways on the second floor of the building. Local legend holds that Wiestling is haunted by a ghost named Sarah and by the ghost of Col. Wiestling, the ironmaster who lived there. Wiestling Hall was originally called the "Hughes Mansion." It was built by Samuel and Daniel Hughes, owners of the original Mont Alto Iron Works. Samuel Lane supervised the construction of the Iron Works and the Mansion House between 1807 and 1808. Holker Hughes, Isaac Waterman, Thomas Bever and Col. George Wiestling, built the reconstituted Mont Alto Iron Works in 1864. Wiestling made the Hughes Mansion House his home and named it "Wiestling Hall." Wiestling Hall was modernized and now it serves as the student building and houses the campus Student Government Association office.
- History has it that John Brown spent time at Emmanuel Chapel before his raid on Harper's Ferry in 1859. Penn State Mont Alto bought the chapel in 1992 for $1 and reopened it in 1999.
- The MAC (Multipurpose Activities Center) is the gym at Penn State Mont Alto. This building sports a few classrooms, a basketball gym, a weight room, a racquetball court, and a multipurpose room used for conferences, dances, and other occasions. Two tennis courts are located outside of the MAC as well.
- The library at Penn State Mont Alto includes a variety of books and research databases that serve faculty, staff, and students, as well as members of the local community. Any Pennsylvania resident may borrow items from the Penn State University library system.
- The most recent building to be added on campus was the Allied Health Building, completed in 2021 at a cost of approximately $13 million.
- The dining hall, formerly known as the Millstream Cafe, and later known as The Mill Cafe, was built in 1968. In 1988, the band Phish played a show at the location.
- September 10, 2014, Penn State Mont Alto opened its Veterans Center. The center was spearheaded by the Penn State Mont Alto Student Veterans Association (SVA), which received a $10,000 VetCenter Initiative grant from the SVA and The Home Depot Foundation partnership to refurbish the spring house on campus, which was built in 1905. It had previously served as a faculty lounge and mailroom. Now it has computers for Internet access and space for student veterans to study and gather.

== Arboretum ==
The Arboretum at Penn State Mont Alto is an arboretum located on the campus (40.81004°N 77.87744°W). It was established on Arbor Day in 1905, just two years after the founding of the Pennsylvania State Forest Academy in Mont Alto. According to the college, on that day students searched for native tree species not present on campus, and brought back more than 400 specimens (30 species). These original plantings were then augmented by seeds from other trees native to the United States. This arboretum continues to provide a training ground for students, as well as a research site for the development of new hybrids. In 2008 Bartlett Tree Experts completed a survey of all arboretum specimens and created a searchable online map. As of 2014, the arboretum contains over 1,000 trees representing 29 families, 70 genera, and 174 species.

== Athletics ==
Penn State Mont Alto teams participate as a member of the United States Collegiate Athletic Association (USCAA). The Nittany Lions are a member of the Pennsylvania State University Athletic Conference (PSUAC). Men's varsity sports include baseball, basketball, golf, and soccer. Women's varsity sports include basketball, golf, soccer, softball, and volleyball. Mont Alto also offers cheerleading as a club sport.

== See also ==
- Bernhard Fernow
- Mont Alto Arboretum
- Pennsylvania State University Commonwealth campuses
