= Caledonia State Park =

State park in Pennsylvania, United States

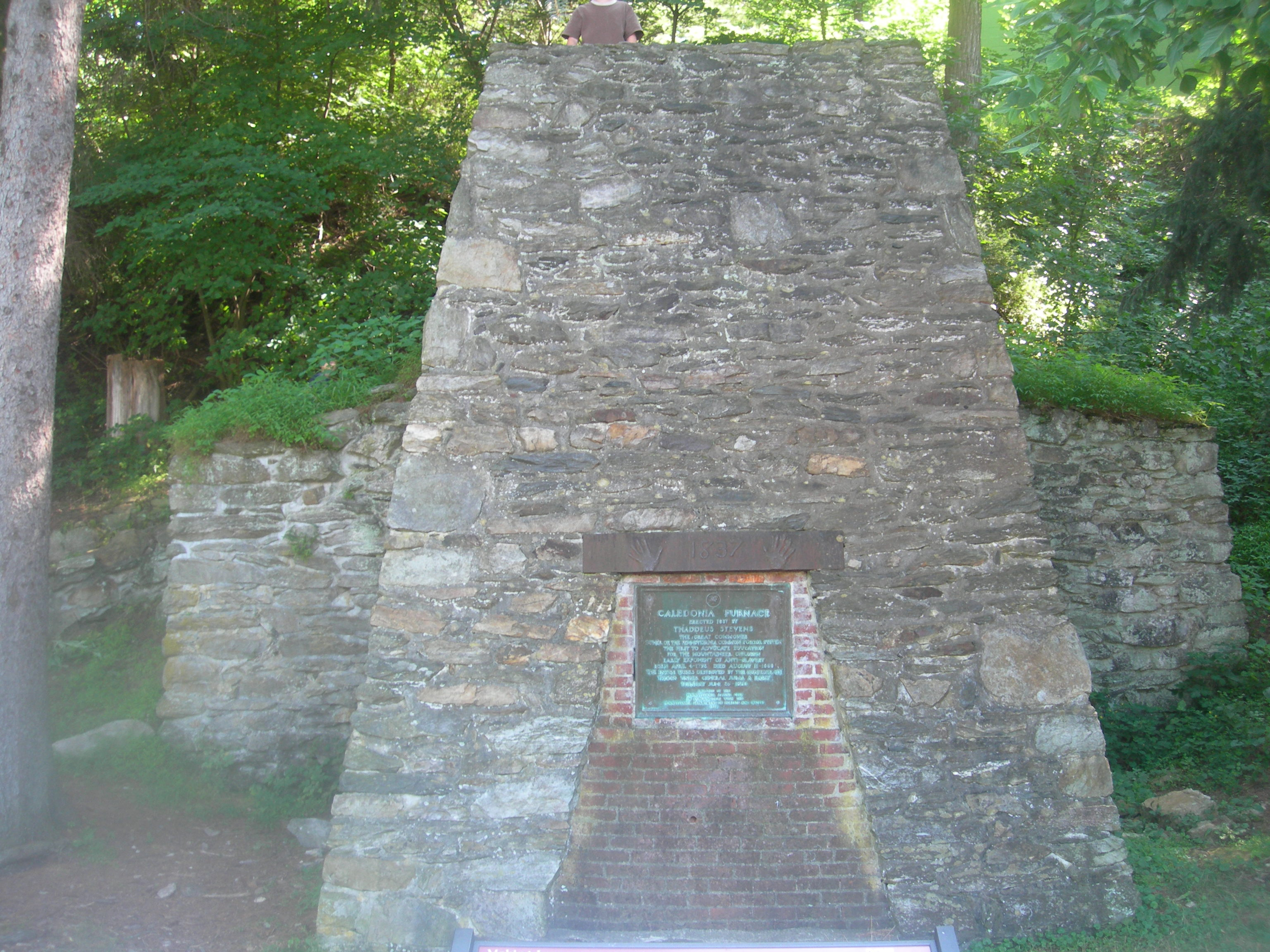
- Reconstruction of Caledonia Furnace

- Location within Pennsylvania Location within the United States
- Interactive map of Caledonia State Park
- Location: Franklin and Adams counties, Pennsylvania, United States
- Coordinates: 39°54′32″N 77°28′42″W
- Area: 1,125 acres (455 ha)
- Elevation: 1,096 ft (334 m)
- Established: 1903
- Administrator: Pennsylvania Department of Conservation and Natural Resources
- Named for: Caledonia Furnace
- Website: Official website
- Pennsylvania State Parks

Caledonia State Park is a 1,125-acre (455 ha) Pennsylvania state park in Greene Township, Franklin County and Franklin Township, Adams County in southern Pennsylvania. It is named for the Caledonia Furnace, an iron furnace that was owned by Thaddeus Stevens beginning in 1837. The park is known for its recreational activities and the Totem Pole Playhouse, a summer stock theater.

== Geography ==
Caledonia State Park is in a valley between Blue Mountain and the South Mountain Range of the northern Blue Ridge Mountains System.

The park is at the intersection of U.S. Route 30 and Pennsylvania Route 233 in Fayetteville, between Chambersburg and Gettysburg.

== History ==
Caledonia State Park was once the site of an iron furnace owned by Thaddeus Stevens, a native of Caledonia County, Vermont. Stevens began operation on the furnace in 1837. He was a member of the U.S. House of Representatives, a noted abolitionist, and is known as the father of the public school system in the Commonwealth of Pennsylvania.

The iron furnace was destroyed during the American Civil War in June 1863 by the Confederate cavalry under the command of General Jubal Early. Some historians believe that the furnace was destroyed not just to slow the industrial power of the Union but also because of Stevens' views opposing slavery. The furnace frequently employed formerly enslaved people, including residents of the nearby Underground Railroad stop at Africa, now known as Brownsville. The pastures surrounding the furnace were used as field hospitals during the Battle of Gettysburg later in July 1863.

The furnace was rebuilt following the war, but was closed by 1902 when the land was sold to the Commonwealth of Pennsylvania. Caledonia State Park was opened in 1903.

The land was leased to the Chambersburg and Gettysburg Trolley Company for a number of years. It became a popular tourist destination for visitors to the Gettysburg Battlefield. The trolley company built various amusement rides at the park that have long since been removed.

A nine-hole golf course was opened in 1922, and has since been expanded to 18 holes. The Pennsylvania Alpine Club paid for the reconstruction of the stack of the old furnace and built a monument. A blacksmith shop, the stack, and numerous charcoal hearths and charcoal roads are visible reminders of the iron-making days. Many of the roads and facilities used today at Caledonia State Park were built during the Great Depression by the young men of the Civilian Conservation Corps (CCC).

== Recreation ==
Caledonia State Park has 10 miles (16 km) of hiking trails, a swimming pool, golf course, a summer stock theater, and is open to hunting and fishing to provide recreation and entertainment for park visitors.

=== Campground ===
Caledonia State Park has a total of 184 tent and trailer campsites at two campgrounds. They open in mid-April for the first weekend of trout season and close in December at the conclusion of deer season. The camping area has hot showers, flush toilets, and a sanitary dump station. A large area for organized group tenting accommodates up to 100 people. The large group camping area has picnic tables, fire rings, and flush toilets.

Two year-round cabins are available to rent. Both cabins can sleep up to 10 people. They have central heat, modern kitchens and bathrooms, three bedrooms, and a living room.

=== Fishing ===
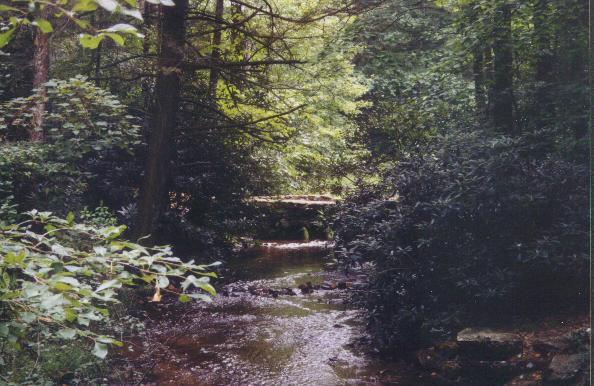
A creek in Caledonia State Park

Fishing is a popular recreational activity at Caledonia State Park and the surrounding Michaux State Forest. Three streams, East Branch Conococheague Creek, Rocky Mountain Creek and Carbaugh Run, flow through the park and forest. The streams are home to some warm water fish as well as brown trout, native brook trout, and rainbow trout. The brown and rainbow trout are stocked by the Pennsylvania Fish and Boat Commission.

=== Hiking ===
The Appalachian Trail passes through Caledonia State Park as it traverses the Appalachian Mountains between Georgia and Maine. Ramble Trail (2.2 miles (3.5 km)) is a trail that passes the old millrace left over from the days of the Caledonia Iron Furnace. There are ten other trails in the park that pass through a variety of habitats and historical sites.

=== Hunting ===
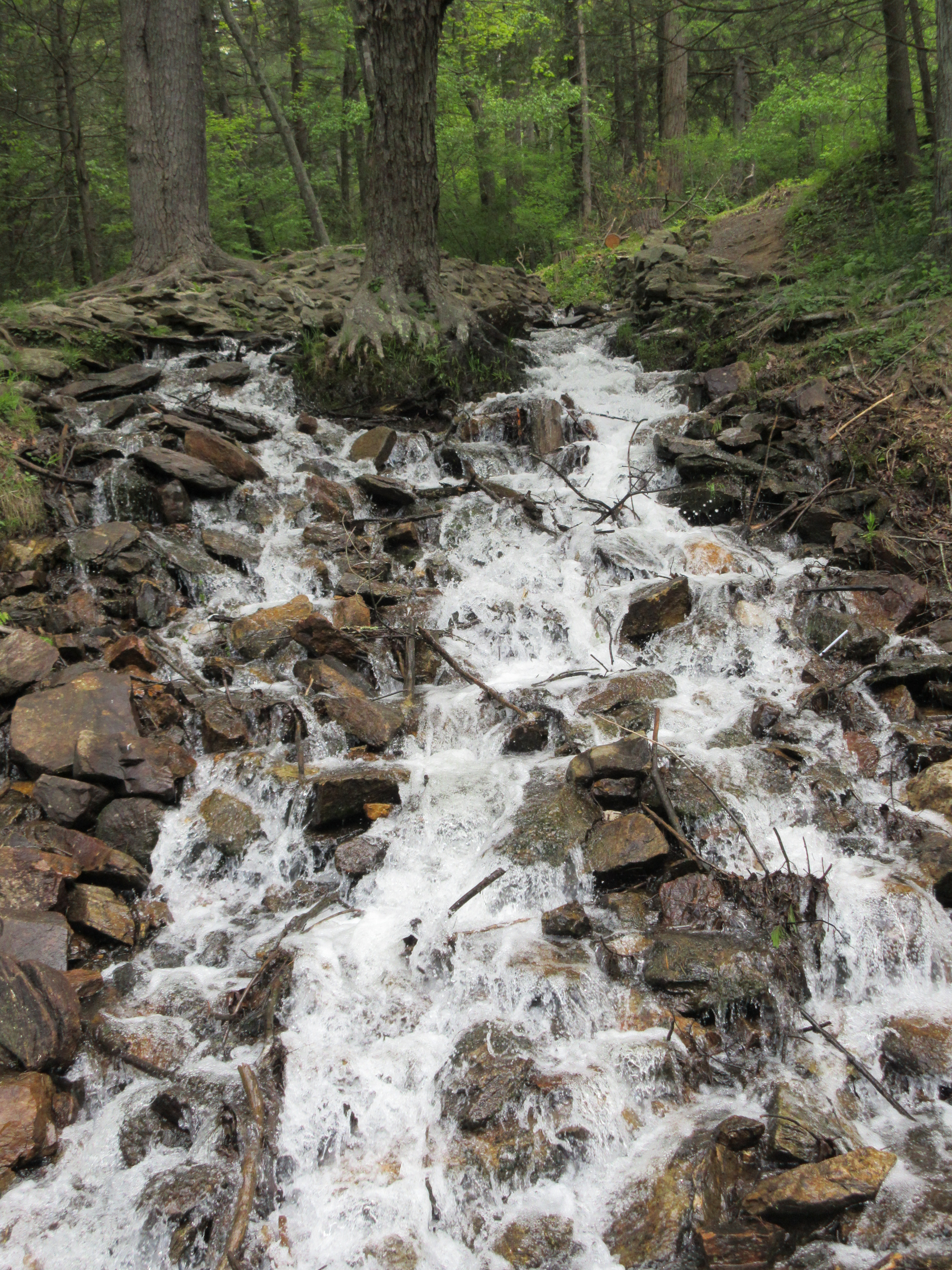
Caledonia Falls.

There are about 740 acres (300 ha) of woods open to hunting at Caledonia State Park. Hunters are expected to follow the rules and regulations of the Pennsylvania Game Commission. The common game species are rabbits, squirrels, white-tailed deer, and turkeys. The hunting of groundhogs is prohibited. Hunters may access the adjoining Michaux State Forest by using the parking lots at Caledonia State Park and hiking in on the trails.

=== Totem Pole Playhouse ===
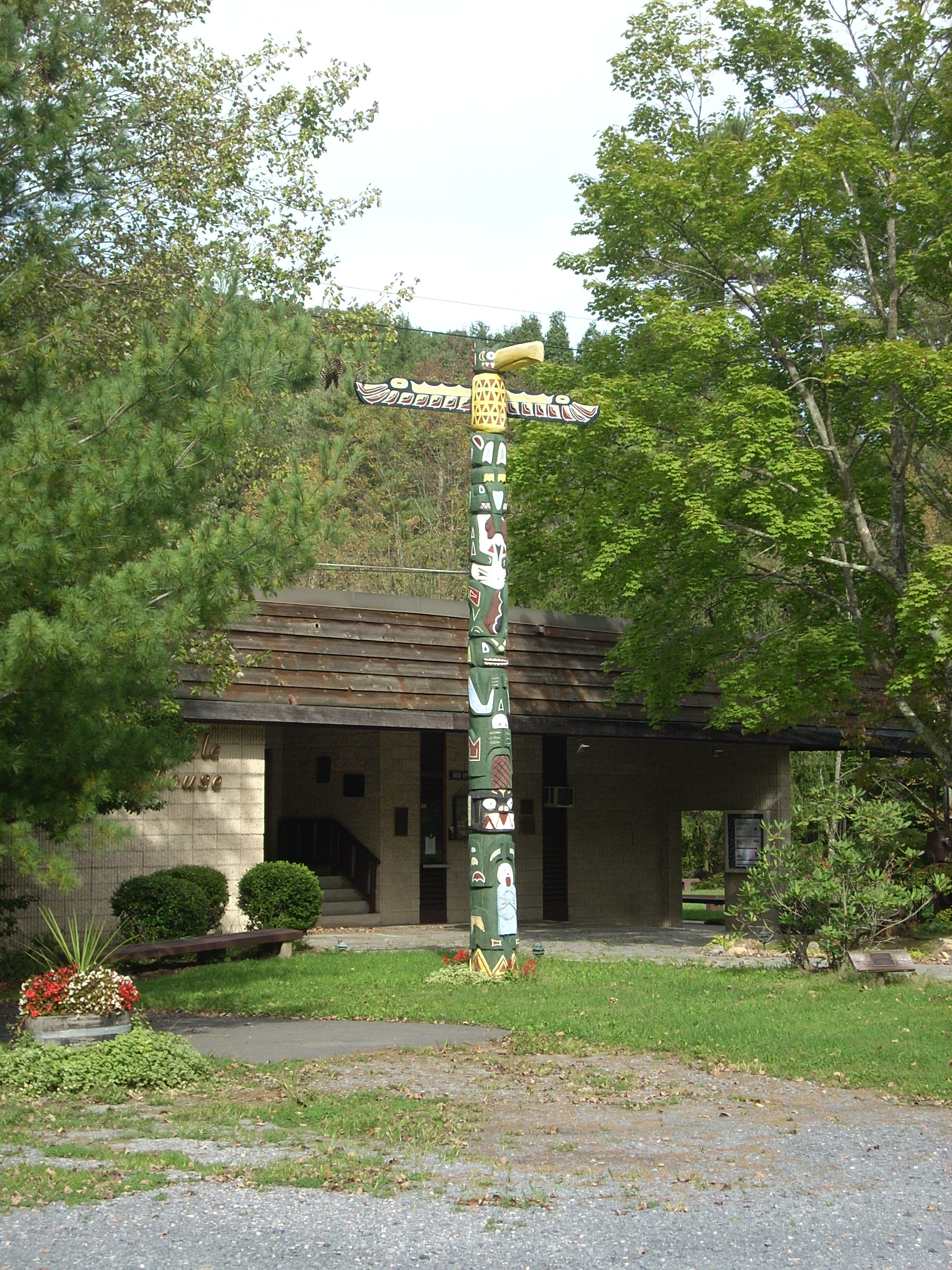
Totem Pole Playhouse

Totem Pole Playhouse, a summer stock theatre at Caledonia State Park, is nationally known for attracting high quality actors and for having a wide variety of theatrical performances. The playhouse began operation in 1950 under the direction of Karl Genus. At that time it was in a concrete block building about 7.5 miles north of Caledonia on the Pine Grove Road near the intersection with the Shippensburg Road before moving to a better location at Caledonia. That building still stands, obscured by trees that have grown in front of it. In the late 1950s that building was used by Duffy Mott Company in Aspers, Pennsylvania as storage.

The Totem Pole Playhouse began to come to national prominence under the direction of William H. Putch, the husband of actress Jean Stapleton. She also acted in many of the playhouse's productions. Putch directed the playhouse for 30 years and was responsible for the production of 270 plays. Famous actors and actresses such as John Ritter, Sandy Dennis, Curtis Armstrong, Eric Szmanda, Granville Van Dusen, Betsy Randle, Michael Learned, Meredith Baxter, and Michael Gross have worked with the resident company of performers over the years.
