= Fayetteville, Pennsylvania =

Unincorporated community in Pennsylvania, US

- Census-designated place
- Location within the U.S. state of Pennsylvania Fayetteville (the United States)
- Coordinates: 39°54′41″N 77°33′54″W
- Country: United States
- State: Pennsylvania
- County: Franklin
- Townships: Greene and Guilford

Area
  - Total: 3.26 sq mi (8.45 km^{2})
  - Land: 3.26 sq mi (8.45 km^{2})
  - Water: 0 sq mi (0.00 km^{2})
- Elevation: 833 ft (254 m)

Population (2020)
  - Total: 3,208
  - Density: 982.7/sq mi (379.43/km^{2})
- Time zone: UTC-5 (Eastern (EST))
  - Summer (DST): UTC-4 (EDT)
- ZIP code: 17222
- Area codes: 717 and 223
- FIPS code: 42-25464
- GNIS feature ID: 2389077

Fayetteville is an unincorporated community and census-designated place (CDP) in Franklin County, Pennsylvania, United States. The population was 3,208 at the 2020 census.

== History ==
A post office called Fayetteville has been in operation since 1826. The community has the name of Gilbert du Motier, Marquis de Lafayette (1757–1834), American Revolutionary War general.

== Geography ==
Fayetteville is located in eastern Franklin County. U.S. Route 30 passes through the community, leading east 18 miles (29 km) to Gettysburg and west 6 miles (10 km) to Chambersburg, the Franklin County seat. Conococheague Creek, a tributary of the Potomac River, forms the northern edge of the community.

According to the United States Census Bureau, the CDP has a total area of 3.2 square miles (8.2 km^{2}), all land.

== Demographics ==
Historical population
Census	Pop.	Note	%±
2020	3,208		—
U.S. Decennial Census

=== 2020 census ===
As of the 2020 census, Fayetteville had a population of 3,208. The median age was 43.3 years. 20.3% of residents were under the age of 18 and 19.6% of residents were 65 years of age or older. For every 100 females there were 90.7 males, and for every 100 females age 18 and over there were 90.5 males age 18 and over.

96.5% of residents lived in urban areas, while 3.5% lived in rural areas.

There were 1,348 households in Fayetteville, of which 29.5% had children under the age of 18 living in them. Of all households, 50.4% were married-couple households, 16.5% were households with a male householder and no spouse or partner present, and 23.5% were households with a female householder and no spouse or partner present. About 25.9% of all households were made up of individuals and 12.4% had someone living alone who was 65 years of age or older.

There were 1,399 housing units, of which 3.6% were vacant. The homeowner vacancy rate was 0.9% and the rental vacancy rate was 2.5%.

Racial composition as of the 2020 census
Race	Number	Percent
White	2,737	85.3%
Black or African American	133	4.1%
American Indian and Alaska Native	15	0.5%
Asian	36	1.1%
Native Hawaiian and Other Pacific Islander	2	0.1%
Some other race	90	2.8%
Two or more races	195	6.1%
Hispanic or Latino (of any race)	216	6.7%

=== 2000 census ===
As of the 2000 census, there were 2,774 people, 1,108 households, and 809 families residing in the CDP. The population density was 851.2 inhabitants per square mile (328.7/km^{2}). There were 1,147 housing units at an average density of 352.0 per square mile (135.9/km^{2}). The racial makeup of the CDP was 95.53% White, 2.27% African American, 0.25% Native American, 0.29% Asian, 0.25% from other races, and 1.41% from two or more races. Hispanic or Latino of any race were 0.87% of the population.

There were 1,108 households, out of which 29.2% had children under the age of 18 living with them, 62.7% were married couples living together, 8.3% had a female householder with no husband present, and 26.9% were non-families. 22.7% of all households were made up of individuals, and 10.3% had someone living alone who was 65 years of age or older. The average household size was 2.43 and the average family size was 2.85.

In the CDP, the population was spread out, with 21.7% under the age of 18, 5.9% from 18 to 24, 26.8% from 25 to 44, 25.2% from 45 to 64, and 20.3% who were 65 years of age or older. The median age was 42 years. For every 100 females, there were 93.3 males. For every 100 females age 18 and over, there were 90.9 males.

The median income for a household in the CDP was $46,014, and the median income for a family was $49,944. Males had a median income of $35,398 versus $22,773 for females. The per capita income for the CDP was $19,537. About 4.1% of families and 4.3% of the population were below the poverty line, including 4.8% of those under age 18 and 10.0% of those age 65 or over.

== Notable people ==
- Tom Brookens, third baseman for Major League Baseball teams
- Benjamin Franklin Heintzleman, governor of the Alaska Territory
- Jean Stapleton, professional actress
- Emma Cooke, archer
