= Pennsylvania Route 997 =

State highway in Pennsylvania, US

Pennsylvania Route 997

Route information
- Maintained by PennDOT
- Length: 48.966 mi (78.803 km)
- Existed: 1928–present

Major junctions
- South end: MD 64 at the Maryland state line in Waynesboro
- PA 16 in Waynesboro; PA 233 in Mont Alto; US 30 near Fayetteville; I-81 / PA 696 near Chambersburg; US 11 near Chambersburg; PA 433 near Chambersburg; PA 533 in Pleasant Hall; PA 641 in Roxbury; I-76 / Penna Turnpike near Roxbury; PA 696 near Newburg
- North end: PA 233 in McCrea

Location
- Country: United States
- State: Pennsylvania
- Counties: Franklin, Cumberland

Highway system
- Pennsylvania State Route System; Interstate; US; State; Scenic; Legislative
← PA 996	→ PA 998

Pennsylvania Route 997 (PA 997) is a 49.0-mile (78.9 km) route that is located in Franklin and Cumberland counties in central Pennsylvania in the United States. This route runs from the Maryland state line south of Waynesboro, where the road continues into that state as Maryland Route 64 (MD 64), north to PA 233 in the Upper Mifflin Township community of McCrea.

PA 997 heads north from the state line through agricultural areas in the Cumberland Valley and passes through Waynesboro, where it intersects PA 16, and Mont Alto, where it intersects the south end of PA 233, before coming to U.S. Route 30 (US 30) in Greenwood. From here, the route turns northwest and comes to a junction with Interstate 81 (I-81) and PA 696 near Scotland and US 11 in Green Village.

PA 997 crosses PA 433 in Culbertson and heads north along the eastern border of Letterkenny Army Depot to Pleasant Hall, where it crosses PA 533. The route continues north through rural areas and intersects PA 433 near Lurgan and PA 641 in Roxbury before heading northeast and reaching an interchange with the Pennsylvania Turnpike (I-76) near Blue Mountain. PA 997 leaves Franklin County for Cumberland County and intersects the north end of PA 696 before continuing to McCrea.

PA 997 was designated in 1928 between Mont Alto and US 30 in Fayetteville along Mont Alto Road. The same year, the present route between the Maryland border and Waynesboro became part of PA 316 while the section between Lurgan and Roxbury became part of PA 433.

PA 333 was designated in 1928 to run from US 30 in Chambersburg northeast to US 11 in Shippensburg, heading north to Pleasant Hall, west to Upper Strasburg, northeast to Roxbury, east to Newburg, and south to Shippensburg. By 1930, PA 997 was extended south from Mont Alto to PA 16 in Waynesboro, while PA 333 was moved to a more direct alignment between Pleasant Hall and Roxbury (running concurrent with PA 433 between Lurgan and Roxbury) and PA 996 was designated onto the road between Scotland and Green Village.

In 1937, PA 997 was extended south to MD 60 at the Maryland border south of Waynesboro and northwest to US 11 in Green Village, replacing PA 996 between Scotland and Green Village, while the north end of PA 333 was cut back to PA 433 in Lurgan and PA 944 was designated onto the road between Roxbury and McCrea. PA 997 swapped alignments with PA 316 south of Waynesboro in 1941, being rerouted to end at MD 64 at the Maryland border.

PA 333 was rerouted to head southeast from Pleasant Hall to PA 433 in Culbertson in the 1940s, with a section of the former alignment south of Pleasant Hall removed for the Letterkenny Army Depot. PA 997 was extended north from Green Village to PA 233 in McCrea, replacing the entire length of PA 333, PA 433 between Lurgan and Roxbury, and PA 944 between Roxbury and McCrea. The route was shifted east to its current alignment between Mont Alto and north of Fayetteville in 1977.

== Route description ==
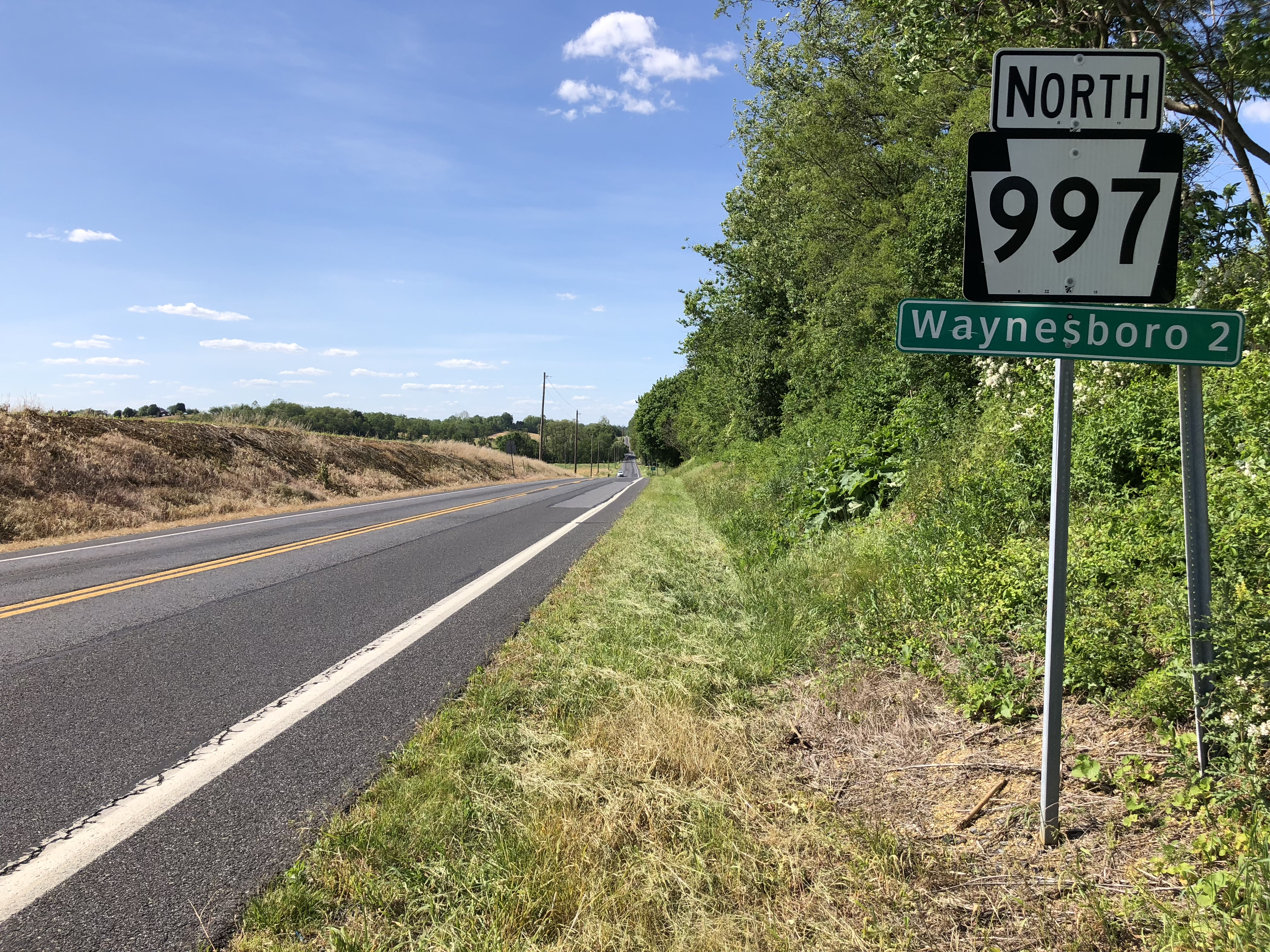
PA 997 northbound past its southern terminus at MD 64 at the Maryland border in Washington Township

PA 997 begins at the Maryland state line in Washington Township, Franklin County, where the road continues south into that state as MD 64. From the state line, the route heads north-northwest as two-lane undivided Anthony Highway through farmland with some trees and homes. The road crosses the East Branch Little Antietam Creek and soon enters the borough of Waynesboro, where the name becomes State Hill Road, where it passes residences and commercial development. PA 997 curves northwest and immediately turns northeast onto Clayton Avenue, passing homes and coming to an intersection with PA 16. Here, the route turns northwest to form a concurrency with PA 16 on East Main Street, passing homes and businesses before continuing into the downtown area.

At the center of town, PA 997 splits from PA 16 by turning northeast onto North Church Street, heading through more residential areas with a few businesses. The route leaves Waynesboro for Washington Township again and becomes Anthony Highway, passing more development before heading into a mix of farms and woods. The road crosses into Quincy Township and curves northwest and north again as it runs through more rural areas with some residential and commercial development, passing through the communities of Quincy and Knepper.

PA 997 curves northeast and heads into the borough of Mont Alto, where it becomes Main Street and passes homes and a few businesses, coming to an intersection with the southern terminus of PA 233. A short distance past this intersection, the route crosses back into Quincy Township and becomes Anthony Highway again, heading into farmland and entering Guilford Township. The road curves north and passes a golf course and residential development in the community of Ledy before heading through Pond Bank. PA 997 heads north-northeast between farm fields and some homes to the west and a section of Michaux State Forest to the east, passing through the community of Sidetown and crossing into Greene Township, where it continues northeast to an intersection with US 30 in the community of Greenwood.

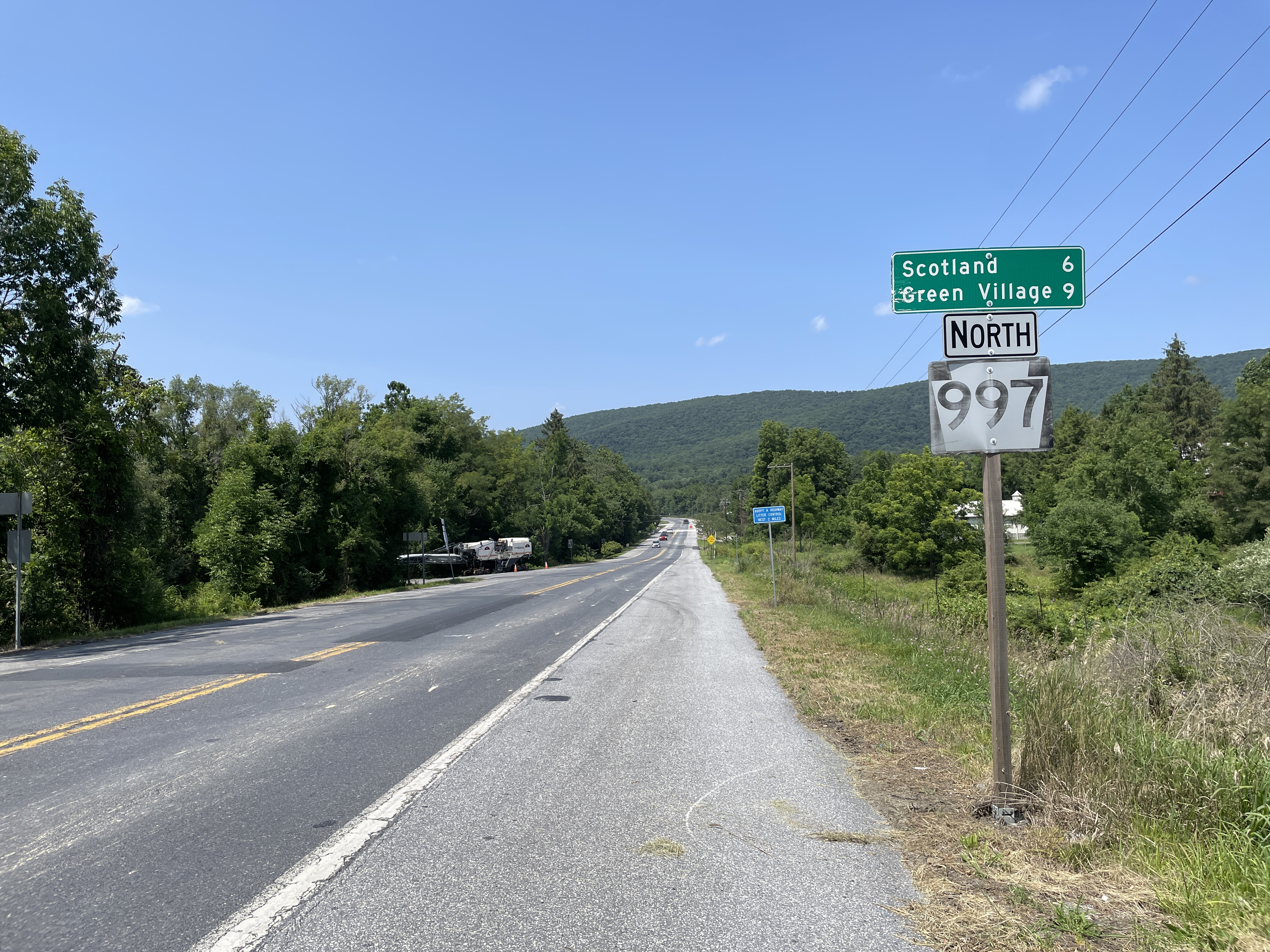
PA 997 northbound past US 30 in Greene Township

At this point, PA 997 turns east for a short concurrency with US 30 on Lincoln Way East before turning north onto Black Gap Road. The road curves northwest and heads through wooded areas with some fields and homes. Farther northwest, the route runs through farmland with some residential and commercial development, and gains a center left-turn lane as it passes to the northeast of the Chambersburg Mall. PA 997 widens to a four-lane divided highway and comes to an intersection with the southern terminus of PA 696 and an interchange with I-81, with the ramps serving the northbound lanes of I-81 connecting to PA 696. Past this interchange, the route narrows to a two-lane undivided road and turns north and northwest through fields and woods to bypass the community of Scotland, coming to a bridge over Norfolk Southern's Lurgan Branch. The road curves west and then northwest and becomes Cumberland Highway, running through farmland with some woods and residential and commercial development. PA 997 comes to an intersection with US 11 in the community of Green Village, where PA 997 Truck heads south along US 11. From here, the route passes homes and businesses with some nearby farmland, crossing the north end of the Pennsylvania & Southern Railways Main Line, and passing through the community of Culbertson.

PA 997 intersects PA 433, where PA 997 Truck returns to the route, and turns north-northwest to run between the Letterkenny Army Depot to the west and agricultural areas to the east. The road crosses into Letterkenny Township and continues north and then northwest through a mix of fields and woods with some development along the eastern border of the military installation. The route curves northeast and heads into the community of Pleasant Hall, where it passes homes and crosses PA 533. From here, PA 997 runs through a mix of farmland and woodland, crossing the Conodoguinet Creek into Lurgan Township. The road continues north and comes to an intersection with the northern terminus of PA 433 near the community of Lurgan. The route runs through more rural land and curves northwest, passing over the Conodoguinet Creek again and heading back into Letterkenny Township. PA 997 curves north and passes some residential development before heading into wooded areas and crossing the creek a third time and reentering Lurgan Township.

At this point, the route heads into the community of Roxbury and comes to a junction with PA 641, where it turns east to follow that route, passing homes. PA 997 splits from PA 641 by turning northeast onto Cumberland Highway, heading through a mix of farmland and woods with some homes a short distance to the southeast of Blue Mountain. Farther northeast, the route passes businesses and comes to a ramp providing access to the Pennsylvania Turnpike (I-76) at the Blue Mountain interchange. After this, the road curves east and runs through the community of McKinney.

PA 997 crosses Laughlin Run into Hopewell Township in Cumberland County and winds east along Enola Road through agricultural areas with some trees and homes, coming to an intersection with the northern terminus of PA 696. At this point, the route turns northeast through more rural land, turning east and northeast again before passing under the Pennsylvania Turnpike. The road enters Upper Mifflin Township and becomes Roxbury Road, continuing through farmland with some wooded areas and residences. PA 997 curves east and then northeast before it makes a turn southeast. In the community of Heberlig, the route makes another turn to the northeast and runs through more rural areas, passing through the community of Little Washington. The road heads into Lower Mifflin Township, where it makes quick turns to the southeast and then to the northeast. PA 997 continues northeast to the community of McCrea, where it comes to its northern terminus at an intersection with PA 233.

== History ==
Pennsylvania Route 333
- Location: Culbertson–Lurgan
- Existed: 1928–1964

When routes were legislated in Pennsylvania in 1911, what is now PA 997 between the Maryland border and Waynesboro was designated as part of Legislative Route 44 while a section of the current route south of Roxbury became part of Legislative Route 264. At this time, an unpaved road ran between Waynesboro, Mont Alto, and Fayetteville. PA 997 was signed in 1928 from Mont Alto, where an unnumbered paved road continued south to Waynesboro, north to US 30 in Fayetteville, following Mont Alto Road. Upon designation, the entire length of PA 997 was paved. The present route between the Maryland border and Waynesboro was designated as part of PA 316, which was paved, while PA 433 was designated onto the unpaved road between Lurgan and Roxbury. PA 333 was designated in 1928 to run from US 30 in Chambersburg northeast to US 11 in Shippensburg, heading north on North Franklin Street and Letterkenny Road to Pleasant Hall before heading west to Upper Strasburg, northeast to Roxbury, east to Newburg, and south to Shippensburg. Upon designation, PA 333 was paved between Chambersburg and Pleasant Hall and Newburg and Shippensburg and was unpaved between Pleasant Hall and Newburg. On February 25, 1929, a bill passed that authorized the state to take over the road between Newburg and McCrea.

By 1930, PA 997 was extended south from Mont Alto to PA 16 in Waynesboro, following a paved road. The same year, PA 333 was shifted east to a more direct alignment between Pleasant Hall and Roxbury that was under construction, running concurrent with PA 433 between Lurgan and Roxbury, while PA 996 was designated onto the paved road between Scotland and US 11 in Green Village. The former alignment of PA 333 became PA 633 (now PA 533) between Pleasant Hall and Upper Strasburg and an unnumbered road between Upper Strasburg and Roxbury. At this time, the road between Mont Alto and Scotland was an unnumbered, unpaved road, the road between Green Village and Culbertson was an unnumbered, paved road, and the road between Roxbury and McCrea was an unnumbered, unpaved road.

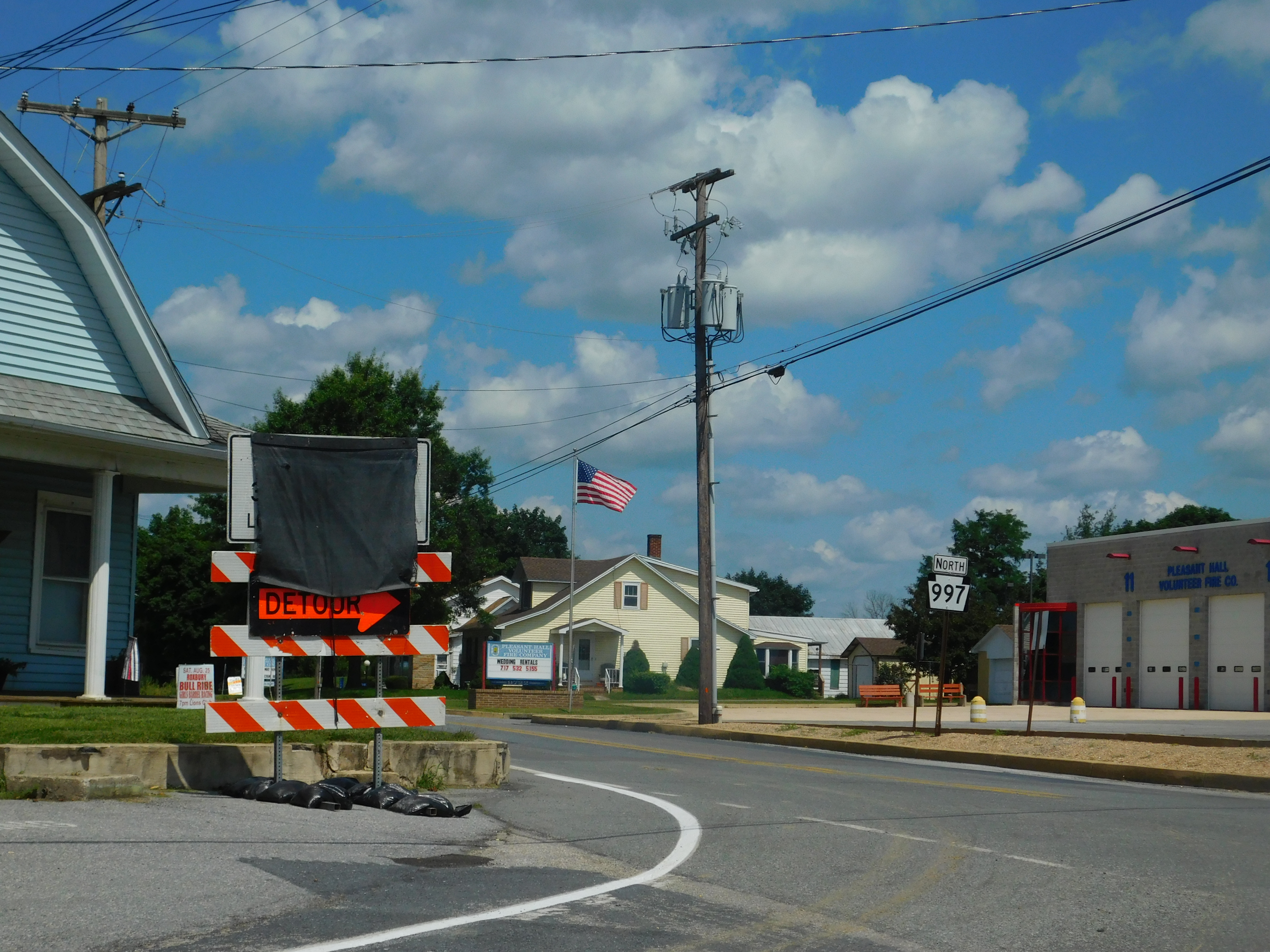
PA 997 north from PA 533 in Letterkenny Township

In 1937, PA 997 was extended south from Waynesboro to MD 60 at the Maryland border, following Potomac Street and Wayne Highway, and was extended northwest from Fayetteville to US 11 in Green Village, following Mont Alto Road, Main Street and Mount Pleasant Road before picking up its current alignment. PA 997 replaced the PA 996 designation between Scotland and Green Village. In addition, the north end of PA 333 was cut back to PA 433 near Lurgan, with PA 641 replacing the route between Roxbury and Newburg and PA 696 replacing the route between Newburg and Shippensburg, and an extended PA 944 was designated onto the road between Roxbury and McCrea.

In the 1930s, the entire length of both PA 333 and PA 997 were paved along with PA 433 between Lurgan and Roxbury, PA 944 between Roxbury and McCrea, and the unnumbered road between Mont Alto and north of Fayetteville via Black Gap. In 1941, PA 997 switched alignments with PA 316 south of Waynesboro, with PA 997 rerouted to head south along Clayton Avenue, State Hill road, and Anthony Highway to MD 64 at the Maryland border. In the 1940s, PA 333 was rerouted to head southeast from Pleasant Hall to PA 433 in Culbertson along a new paved road, with a section of the former route between Beautiful and Pleasant Hall removed for the Letterkenny Army Depot.

In 1964, PA 997 was extended north from Green Village to PA 233 in McCrea, replacing the entire length of PA 333 between Culbertson and Lurgan, the section of PA 433 between Lurgan and Roxbury, and the section of PA 944 between Roxbury and McCrea. In the 1960s, PA 997 was rerouted to bypass Scotland to the northeast, with the former alignment now unnumbered Main Street. In 1977, PA 997 was moved off its alignment on Mont Alto Road, Main Street and Mount Pleasant Road and shifted east onto its current route via Black Gap.

== Major intersections ==
County	Location	mi	km	Destinations	Notes
Franklin	Washington Township	0.000	0.000	MD 64 west (Smithsburg Pike) – Ringgold	Continuation into Maryland
Franklin	Waynesboro	2.467	3.970	PA 16 east (Main Street) – Emmitsburg, MD	South end of PA 16 overlap
Franklin	Waynesboro	2.788	4.487	PA 16 west (Main Street) – Greencastle	North end of PA 16 overlap
Franklin	Mont Alto	9.519	15.319	PA 233 north (Park Street)	Southern terminus of PA 233
Franklin	Greene Township	14.400	23.175	US 30 west (Lincoln Way) – Chambersburg	South end of US 30 overlap
Franklin	Greene Township	14.515	23.360	US 30 east (Lincoln Way) – Gettysburg, Caledonia State Park	North end of US 30 overlap
Franklin	Greene Township	19.654	31.630	PA 696 north (Olde Scotland Way) to I-81 north – Carlisle	Southern terminus of PA 696
Franklin	Greene Township	19.677	31.667	I-81 south – Chambersburg	Exit 20 on I-81
Franklin	Greene Township	22.591	36.357	US 11 / PA 997 Truck north (Molly Pitcher Highway) – Chambersburg, Shippensburg	Southern terminus of PA 997 Truck
Franklin	Greene Township	23.846	38.376	PA 433 / PA 997 Truck south (Sunset Pike/Rowe Run Road) – Chambersburg, Orrstown	Northern terminus of PA 997 Truck
Franklin	Letterkenny Township	27.814	44.762	PA 533 (Orrstown Road) – Upper Strasburg, Orrstown, Shippensburg	
Franklin	Lurgan Township	29.938	48.181	PA 433 south (Tanyard Hill Road) – Orrstown, Shippensburg	Northern terminus of PA 433
Franklin	Lurgan Township	32.530	52.352	PA 641 west (Newburg Road) – Spring Run	South end of PA 641 overlap
Franklin	Lurgan Township	32.666	52.571	PA 641 east (Newburg Road) – Newburg	North end of PA 641 overlap
Franklin	Lurgan Township	36.654	58.989	I-76 / Penna Turnpike – Pittsburgh, Harrisburg	Exit 201 on I-76 / Turnpike; E-ZPass or toll-by-plate
Cumberland	Hopewell Township	38.303	61.643	PA 696 south – Newburg, Shippensburg	Northern terminus of PA 696
Cumberland	Lower Mifflin Township	48.966	78.803	PA 233 – Landisburg, Newville, Enola	Northern terminus
1.000 mi = 1.609 km; 1.000 km = 0.621 mi: Concurrency terminus; Electronic toll collection

== PA 997 Truck ==
Pennsylvania Route 997 Truck
- Location: Franklin County, Pennsylvania
- Length: 2.978 mi (4.793 km)

Pennsylvania Route 997 Truck (PA 997 Truck) is a 3.0-mile (4.8 km) truck route of PA 997 in Greene Township in Franklin County. The truck route begins at PA 997 in Green Village by heading southwest concurrent with US 11 on Philadelphia Avenue, a three-lane road with a center left-turn lane that passes through a mix of farmland and residential and commercial development. The road intersects the southern terminus of PA 433, where PA 997 Truck splits from US 11 by heading north with PA 433 on two-lane undivided Sunset Pike. The road passes through agricultural areas with some industrial development, crossing CSX's Lurgan Subdivision railroad line. At this point, the route passes to the east of an industrial area adjacent to the Letterkenny Army Depot. The roadway comes to a junction with PA 997, where PA 997 Truck ends and PA 433 continues north.
