= Pennsylvania Route 433 =

State highway in Franklin County, Pennsylvania, US

Pennsylvania Route 433

Route information
- Maintained by PennDOT
- Length: 9.125 mi (14.685 km)
- Existed: 1928–present

Major junctions
- South end: US 11 in Greene Township
- PA 997 near Letterkenny Army Depot; PA 533 in Orrstown
- North end: PA 997 in Lurgan Township

Location
- Country: United States
- State: Pennsylvania
- Counties: Franklin

Highway system
- Pennsylvania State Route System; Interstate; US; State; Scenic; Legislative
← PA 432	→ PA 434

Pennsylvania Route 433 (PA 433) is a 9.1-mile-long (14.6 km) state highway located in Franklin County, Pennsylvania. The southern terminus is at U.S. Route 11 (US 11) near Red Bridge. The northern terminus is at PA 997 in Lurgan Township. PA 433 is a two-lane undivided road that passes through farmland in northern Franklin County. The route passes to the east of the Letterkenny Army Depot before it crosses PA 997. The route heads northeast and north before curving northwest and crossing PA 533 in Orrstown. PA 433 continues northwest to its end at PA 997.

PA 433 was designated in 1928 to run from US 11 near Red Bridge north to US 522 in Shade Gap, heading north along its present route and then heading northwest through Roxbury and Spring Run before reaching Shade Gap. PA 641 became concurrent with a portion of PA 433 west of Roxbury in 1937. In the 1960s, the north end of PA 433 was cut back to PA 997 in Lurgan Township, with the former alignment north of there becoming PA 997 to Roxbury, solely PA 641 to the west of Roxbury, unnumbered Cold Spring Road and Amberson Road (now PA 641 Truck), and an extended PA 641 west to Shade Gap.

== Route description ==
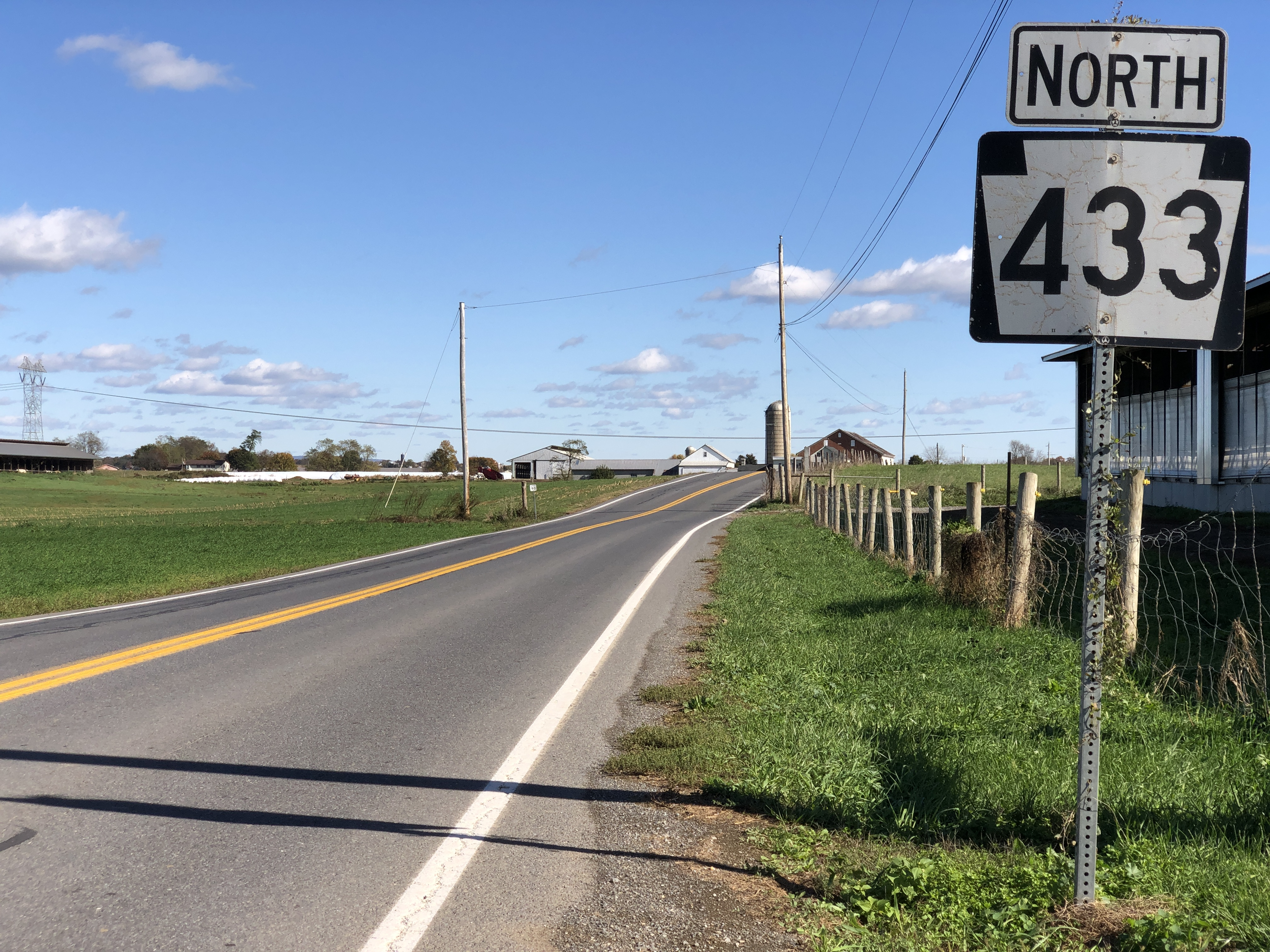
PA 433 northbound in Southampton Township

PA 433 begins at an intersection with US 11 in Greene Township, heading north on two-lane undivided Sunset Pike concurrent with PA 997 Truck. The road passes through agricultural areas with some industrial development, crossing the Pennsylvania & Southern Railway's Main line. At this point, the route passes to the east of an industrial area adjacent to the Letterkenny Army Depot. PA 433 comes to a junction with PA 997, where the truck route ends, and turns northeast onto Rowe Run Road, heading into open farm fields. The road continues into Southampton Township and passes through the community of Pinola, turning to the north into farmland with some woods. The road curves to the northwest and heads into the borough of Orrstown, where it passes homes and crosses PA 533. PA 433 crosses back into Southampton Township before crossing the Conodoguinet Creek into Lurgan Township and becoming Tanyard Hill Road. The road continues through farmland with some woods and homes before reaching its northern terminus at another intersection with PA 997.

== History ==
When routes were legislated in Pennsylvania in 1911, what would become PA 433 was legislated as part of Legislative Route 264 between Orrstown and Spring Run and as part of Legislative Route 121 between Spring Run and Shade Gap. PA 433 was designated in 1928 to run from US 11 northeast of Chambersburg north to US 522 in Shade Gap, following its present alignment before heading northwest and passing through Roxbury and Spring Run before coming to Shade Gap. Upon designation, PA 433 was paved between US 11 and south of Orrstown while the remainder was unpaved. By 1930, the route was under construction along the PA 333 (now PA 997) concurrency to the south of Roxbury. In 1937, an extended PA 641 became concurrent with PA 433 between Roxbury and the point PA 433 turned north onto Cold Spring Road to the west of Roxbury. The entire length of PA 433 was paved in the 1930s. The northern terminus of PA 433 was cut back to its current location at PA 997 in the 1960s. The former alignment became PA 997 (which replaced PA 333) north to Roxbury, solely PA 641 between Roxbury and Cold Spring Road, unnumbered Cold Spring Road and Amberson Road (now PA 641 Truck), and a westward extension of PA 641 between Amberson Road and US 522 in Shade Gap.

== Major intersections ==
The entire route is in Franklin County.

Location	mi	km	Destinations	Notes
Greene Township	0.000	0.000	US 11 / PA 997 Truck south (Philadelphia Avenue) to I-81 – Shippensburg, Chambersburg	Southern terminus; south end of PA 997 Truck overlap
Greene Township	1.668	2.684	PA 997 (Cumberland Highway) – Pleasant Hall, Roxbury	North end of PA 997 Truck overlap
Orrstown	6.788	10.924	PA 533 (Orrstown Road) – Pleasant Hall, Shippensburg	
Lurgan Township	9.125	14.685	PA 997 (Cumberland Highway) – Pleasant Hall, Roxbury	Northern terminus
1.000 mi = 1.609 km; 1.000 km = 0.621 mi: Concurrency terminus
