= Pennsylvania Route 533 =

State highway in Pennsylvania, US

Pennsylvania Route 533

Route information
- Maintained by PennDOT
- Length: 21.738 mi (34.984 km)

Major junctions
- West end: SR 4004 (Mountain Road/Valley Road) in Upper Strasburg
- PA 997 in Pleasant Hall; PA 433 in Orrstown; US 11 in Shippensburg; PA 696 in Shippensburg; PA 174 in Shippensburg; US 11 near Shippensburg
- East end: PA 233 in Newville

Location
- Country: United States
- State: Pennsylvania
- Counties: Franklin, Cumberland

Highway system
- Pennsylvania State Route System; Interstate; US; State; Scenic; Legislative
← PA 532	→ PA 534
← PA 632	PA 633	→ PA 639

Pennsylvania Route 533 (PA 533) is a 21.7-mile-long (34.9 km) state highway located in Franklin and Cumberland counties in Pennsylvania. The western terminus is at State Route 4004 (SR 4004) at a junction with Mountain Road, Valley Road, and Community Road in the community of Upper Strasburg in Letterkenny Township. The eastern terminus is at PA 233 in Newville. PA 533 heads east from Upper Strasburg as a two-lane undivided road through farmland, passing to the north of Letterkenny Army Depot before crossing PA 997 in Pleasant Hall. The route continues east and crosses PA 433 in Orrstown before reaching Shippensburg, where it reaches U.S. Route 11 (US 11). Here, PA 533 becomes concurrent with US 11 and intersects PA 696 in the downtown area and PA 174 upon leaving Shippensburg. PA 533 splits from US 11 and runs northeast through more agricultural areas before reaching Newville.

The section of road between Upper Strasburg and Pleasant Hall was designated as part of PA 333 in 1928. PA 533 was designated in 1930 to run from PA 433 in Orrstown east to US 11 in Shippensburg. The same year, PA 633 was designated to run from Upper Strasburg east to PA 333 (now PA 997) in Pleasant Hall after PA 333 was realigned. In 1937, PA 533 was extended west to PA 944 in Upper Strasburg, replacing all of PA 633, and extended east to PA 233 in Newville. The intersecting PA 944 designation was removed from the western terminus in the 1940s.

== Route description ==
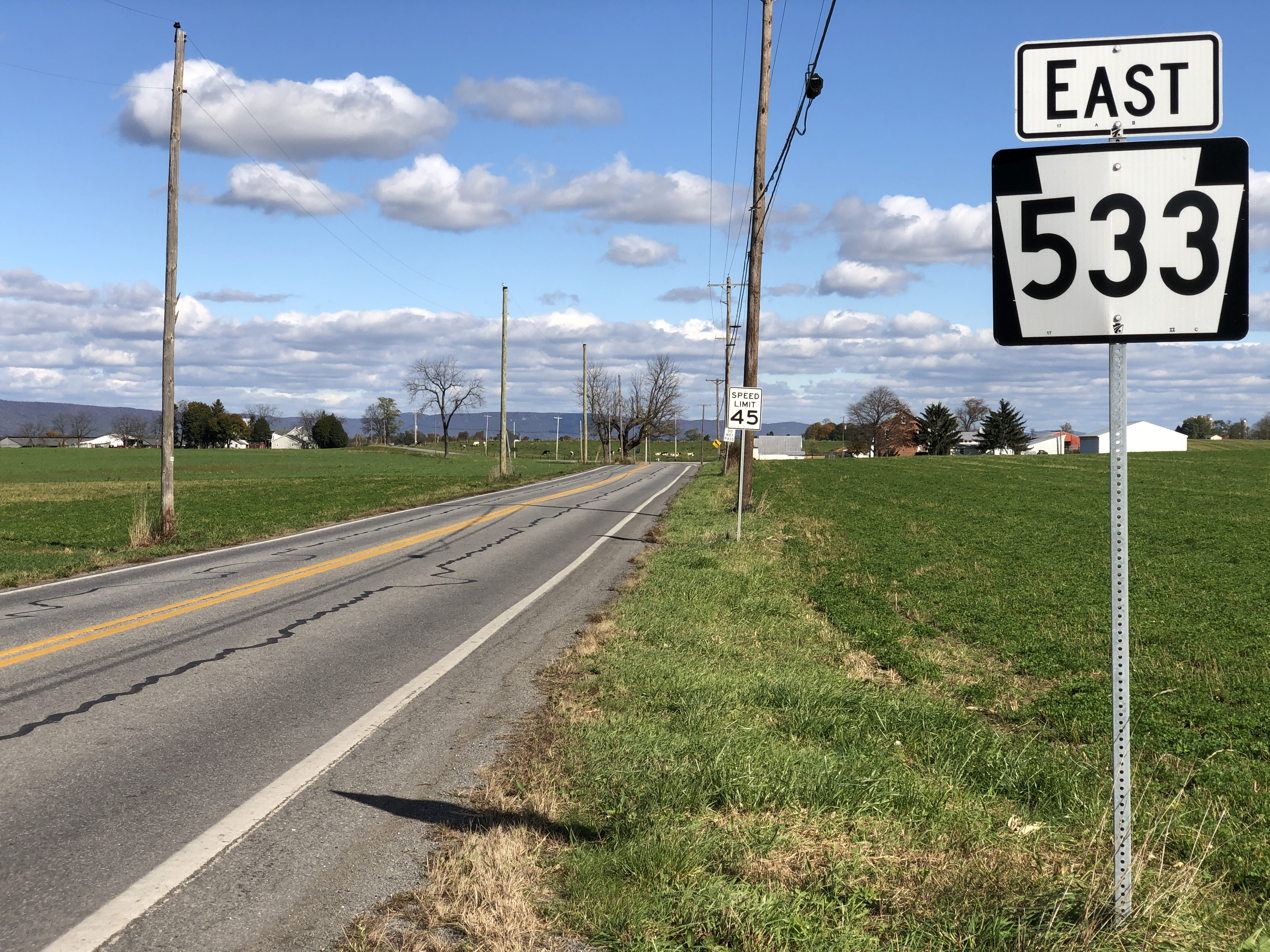
PA 533 eastbound in North Newton Township

PA 533 begins at an intersection with SR 4004 (Mountain Road/Valley Road) and Community Road in the community of Upper Strasburg in Letterkenny Township, Franklin County. At the western terminus, Valley Road heads to the west, Mountain Road heads to the north, and Community Road heads to the south. From this intersection, the route heads east on two-lane undivided Upper Strasburg Road past homes before heading into open farmland with a few residences, forming the northern boundary of the Letterkenny Army Depot. In the community of Pleasant Hall, PA 533 crosses PA 997. Past this intersection, the route becomes Orrstown Road and heads away from the Letterkenny Army Depot, continuing through more agricultural areas with occasional homes. The road curves northeast and heads into Southampton Township and passes through more rural areas before entering the borough of Orrstown. Here, PA 533 is lined with homes and intersects PA 433. The route heads back into Southampton Township and runs through more farmland with a few residences, turning to the east. Farther east, the road heads into the borough of Shippensburg and becomes North Morris Street, passing several homes.

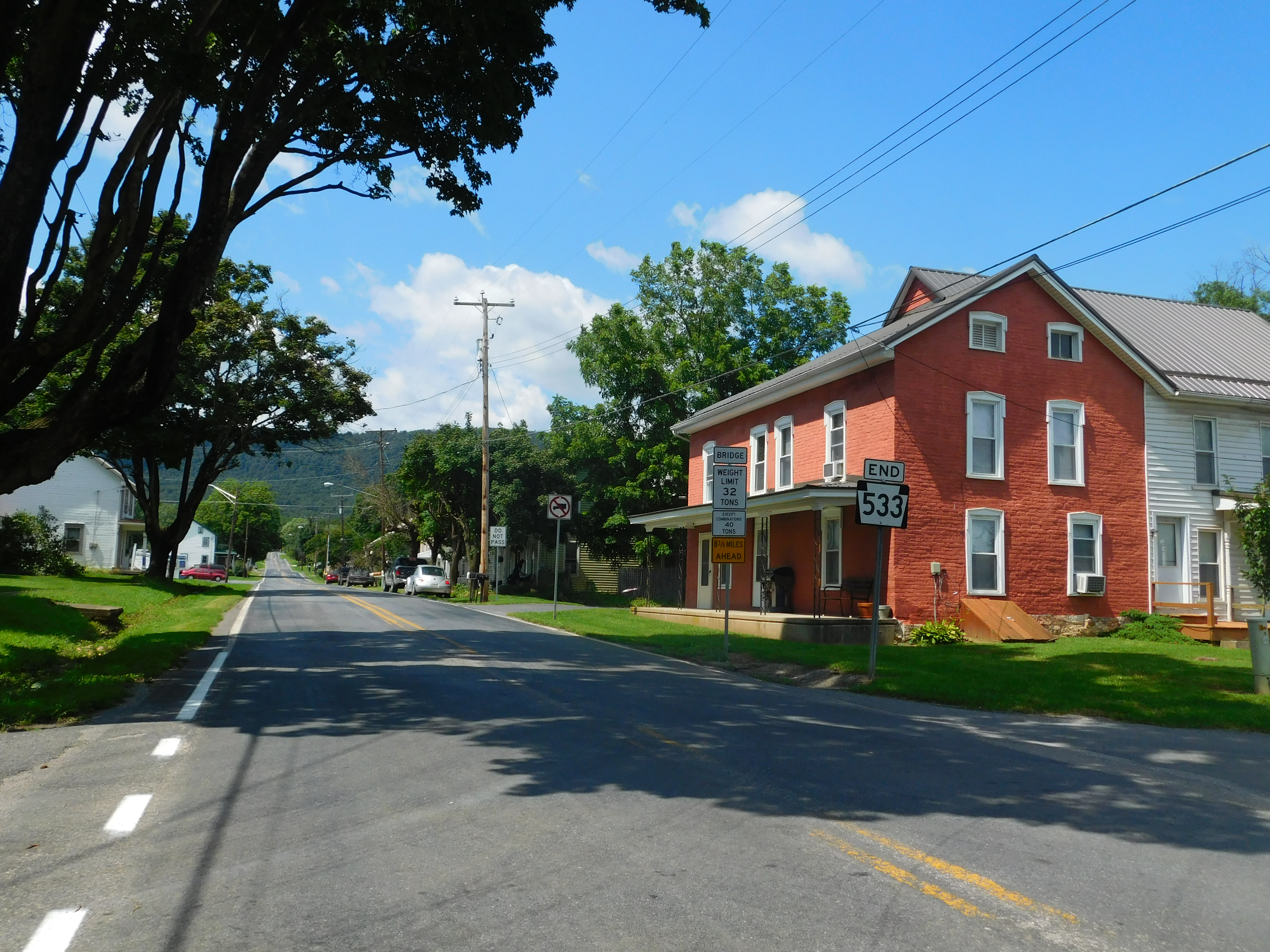
PA 533 in Upper Strasburg

PA 533 becomes the border between Cumberland County to the north and Franklin County to the south and runs through more residential areas of Shippensburg, intersecting US 11. At this point, the route turns northeast to form a concurrency with US 11 on West King Street, fully entering Cumberland County. The road heads into the commercial downtown, reaching an intersection with PA 696. Here, PA 696 joins US 11/PA 533 and runs through more of the downtown. PA 696 splits to the north and US 11/PA 533 becomes East King Street, leaving the downtown and heading into more residential areas. Upon intersecting the western terminus of PA 174, the road heads into Shippensburg Township and passes a few businesses before heading into a mix of farmland and woodland with a few homes. US 11/PA 533 continues into Southampton Township and becomes Ritner Highway. PA 533 splits from US 11 by heading northwest onto Newville Road. The route curves to the northeast and runs through open agricultural areas with some residences and woods. The road passes to the east of a quarry before it continues into North Newton Township and continues through agricultural surroundings. At the Oakville Road junction, PA 533 becomes Shippensburg Road and runs through more rural areas. Farther northeast, the route passes over the Cumberland Valley Rail Trail. The road continues into the borough of Newville and becomes Fairfield Avenue, turning east into residential areas. PA 533 becomes Vine Street at the West Big Spring Avenue intersection and continues east to its terminus at PA 233.

== History ==
Pennsylvania Route 633
- Location: Upper Strasburg – Pleasant Hall
- Existed: 1930–1937

When Pennsylvania first legislated routes in 1911, what is now PA 533 was not assigned a number. At this time, the roadway between Upper Strasburg and Shippensburg was an unpaved road. By 1928, the road between Orrstown and Shippensburg was paved while PA 333 was designated onto the section of unpaved road between Upper Strasburg and Pleasant Hall. In 1930, PA 533 was designated to run from PA 433 in Orrstown east to US 11 in Shippensburg while PA 633 was designated to run from Upper Strasburg east to PA 333 (now PA 997) in Pleasant Hall after PA 333 was realigned to a more direct route between Pleasant Hall and Roxbury. By this time, PA 633 was a paved road while the unnumbered roadways between Pleasant Hall and Orrstown and Shippensburg and Newville were unpaved. In 1937, PA 533 was extended west from Orrstown to PA 944 (Community Road/Mountain Road) in Upper Strasburg, replacing the entire length of PA 633, and was extended east from Shippensburg to PA 233 in Newville. The entire length of PA 533 was paved in the 1930s. In the 1940s, the intersecting PA 944 designation was removed at the western terminus, leaving PA 533 ending at an unnumbered road.

== Major intersections ==
County	Location	mi	km	Destinations	Notes
Franklin	Letterkenny Township	0.000	0.000	SR 4004 (Mountain Road / Valley Road) – Roxbury	Western terminus
Franklin	Letterkenny Township	3.044	4.899	PA 997 (Cumberland Highway) – Roxbury, Chambersburg	
Franklin	Orrstown	5.725	9.213	PA 433 (Tanyard Hill Road / Rowe Run Road) – Roxbury, Chambersburg	
Franklin–Cumberland county line	Shippensburg	10.402	16.740	US 11 south (King Street) – Chambersburg	West end of US 11 concurrency
Cumberland	Shippensburg	10.620	17.091	PA 696 south (Fayette Street) to I-81	West end of PA 696 concurrency
Cumberland	Shippensburg	10.846	17.455	PA 696 north (Earl Street)	East end of PA 696 concurrency
Cumberland	Shippensburg–Shippensburg Township line	11.689	18.812	PA 174 east (Walnut Bottom Road) to I-81	Western terminus of PA 174
Cumberland	Southampton Township	13.084	21.057	US 11 north (Ritner Highway) – Carlisle	East end of US 11 concurrency
Cumberland	Newville	21.738	34.984	PA 233 (High Street) – Doubling Gap, Pine Grove Furnace	Eastern terminus
1.000 mi = 1.609 km; 1.000 km = 0.621 mi: Concurrency terminus
