= Pennsylvania Route 696 =

State highway in Pennsylvania, US

Pennsylvania Route 696

Route information
- Maintained by PennDOT
- Length: 16.017 mi (25.777 km)
- Existed: 1930–present

Major junctions
- South end: PA 997 in Greene Township
- I-81 in Greene Township; I-81 in Southampton Township; US 11 / PA 533 in Shippensburg; PA 641 in Newburg
- North end: PA 997 in Hopewell Township

Location
- Country: United States
- State: Pennsylvania
- Counties: Franklin, Cumberland

Highway system
- Pennsylvania State Route System; Interstate; US; State; Scenic; Legislative
← I-695	→ PA 701

Pennsylvania Route 696 (PA 696) is a 16.0-mile-long (25.7 km) state highway located in Franklin and Cumberland counties in Pennsylvania. The southern terminus is at PA 997 in Greene Township. The northern terminus is at PA 997 in Hopewell Township. PA 696 begins at PA 997 adjacent to an interchange with Interstate 81 (I-81) and heads northeast through farmland parallel to the interstate. The route turns north and has an interchange with I-81 before it continues into Shippensburg, where it has a brief concurrency with U.S. Route 11 (US 11) and PA 533 in the downtown area. Past Shippensburg, PA 696 runs north through more farmland and heads to Newburg, where it has a short concurrency with PA 641. The route heads northwest from here to its terminus at PA 997.

In 1928, the road between Shippensburg and Newburg was designated as part of PA 333. PA 696 was designated in 1930 to run from US 11 in Chambersburg northeast to PA 996 (Main Street) in Scotland, running along Scotland Road. In 1937, PA 696 was extended north from Scotland to PA 641 in Newburg, replacing the section of PA 333 between Shippensburg and Newburg. The south end of the route was cut back to its current location at PA 997 in the 1960s, with the road between Chambersburg and Scotland becoming unnumbered. In the 1970s, PA 696 was extended north from Newburg to PA 997.

== Route description ==
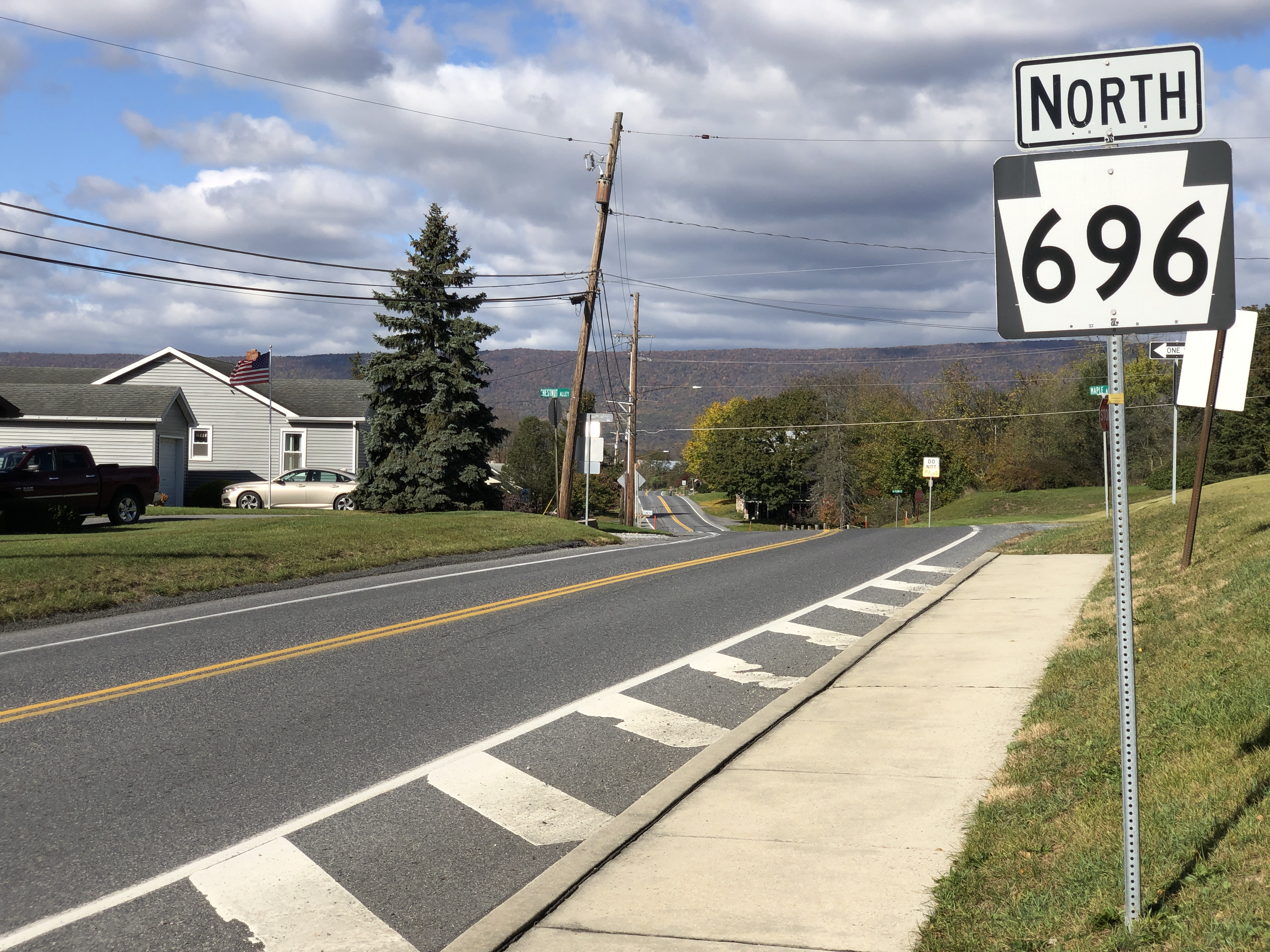
PA 696 northbound past PA 641 in Newburg

PA 696 begins at an intersection with PA 997 a short distance to the east of I-81 in Greene Township, Franklin County, heading north on two-lane undivided Olde Scotland Road. A short distance later, the route comes to a pair of ramps providing access to and from the northbound lanes of I-81. The road continues immediately to the east of I-81 as it heads into agricultural areas, turning northeast away from the interstate. PA 696 runs through more open farmland with a few homes, crossing into Southampton Township. In this area, the road turns north again and comes to a full interchange with I-81. Past this interchange, the route turns northeast again and runs through more rural areas with some residential and commercial development, running a short distance to the east of Norfolk Southern's Lurgan Branch railroad line.

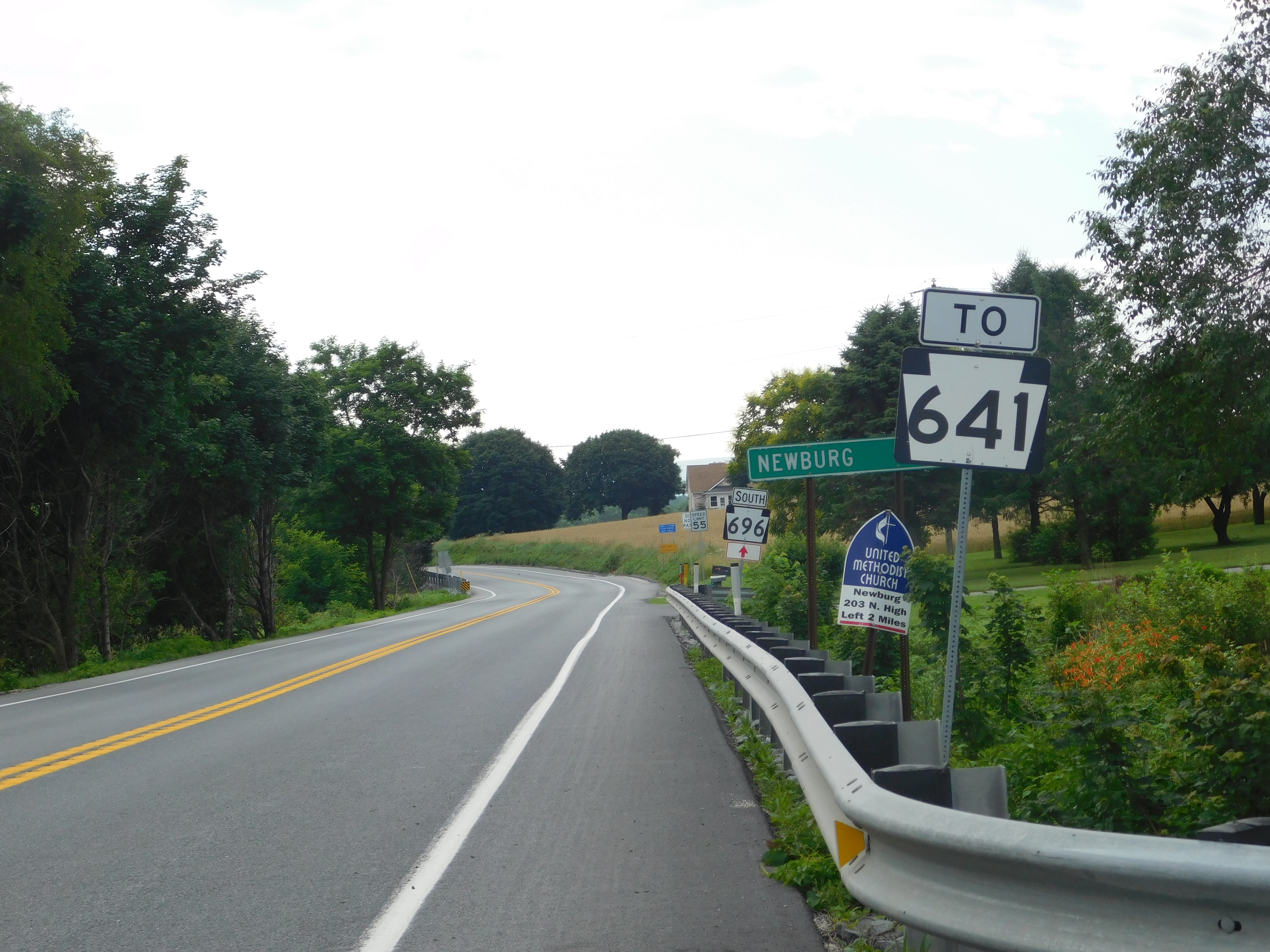
PA 696 in Hopewell Township from PA 997

PA 696 crosses into Shippensburg Township in Cumberland County and curves east, making a turn north onto South Fayette Street. The route briefly becomes the border between Shippensburg Township to the west and the borough of Shippensburg to the east before fully entering Shippensburg Township again, passing under the Lurgan Branch and crossing Middle Spring Creek prior to heading back into Southampton Township, Franklin County. The road runs through commercial areas, heading into Shippensburg before crossing back into Cumberland County and passing under Norfolk Southern's Lurgan Running Track railroad line. PA 696 passes a few homes before entering the commercial downtown of Shippensburg, turning east to form a concurrency with US 11/PA 533 on West King Street. PA 696 splits from US 11/PA 533 by turning north onto North Earl Street and heading past homes. The road passes to the west of the trailhead for the Cumberland Valley Rail Trail. The route heads back into Shippensburg Township and passes between residential areas to the west and Shippensburg University of Pennsylvania to the east, briefly gaining a center left-turn lane near the York Drive intersection before becoming a two-lane road again. The road turns northwest and heads into Southampton Township, becoming Newburg Road as it enters agricultural areas with some woods and housing developments, curving north again. PA 696 enters more rural areas as it heads farther north, crossing into Hopewell Township. In this area, the route becomes Shippensburg Road as it passes through more farmland with some woods and homes. The road crosses the Conodoguinet Creek and curves northwest, heading into the borough of Newburg and becoming South Water Street, passing homes. PA 696 curves north and turns west to follow PA 641 for a block on West Main Street. The route splits from PA 641 by turning northwest onto North Mountain Street. The road heads back into Hopewell Township and becomes Turnpike Road, passing through agricultural areas with a few homes. PA 696 continues northwest to its northern terminus at another intersection with PA 997.

== History ==
When Pennsylvania first legislated routes in 1911, what is now PA 696 was not assigned a number. By this time, a paved road ran between Chambersburg and Scotland. In 1928, the road between US 11 in Shippensburg and Newburg was designated as part of PA 333, which was paved. On February 25, 1929, a bill passed that authorized the state to take over the road between Newburg and McCrea. PA 696 was designated in 1930 to run from US 11 in Chambersburg northeast to PA 996 (Main Street) in Scotland, following Broad Street, Scotland Avenue, and Scotland Road. In 1937, PA 696 was extended north from Scotland to PA 641 in Newburg, replacing the former section of PA 333 between Shippensburg and Newburg. The entire length of PA 696 was a paved road in the 1930s along with the unnumbered road from Newburg north to PA 944 (now PA 997). In the 1960s, the south end of PA 696 was moved to its current location at PA 997 near the I-81 interchange, with the road between Chambersburg and Scotland becoming unnumbered. PA 696 was extended north from Newburg to its present northern terminus at PA 997 in the 1970s.

== Major intersections ==
County	Location	mi	km	Destinations	Notes
Franklin	Greene Township	0.000	0.000	PA 997 (Black Gap Road) to I-81 south – Fayetteville, Scotland	Southern terminus
Franklin	Greene Township	0.135– 0.140	0.217– 0.225	I-81 north – Carlisle	Exit 20 (I-81); I-81 northbound entrance / exit only
Franklin	Southampton Township	4.423	7.118	I-81 – Carlisle, Chambersburg	Exit 24 (I-81)
Cumberland	Shippensburg	7.083	11.399	US 11 south / PA 533 west (West King Street)	South end of US 11/PA 533 overlap
Cumberland	Shippensburg	7.309	11.763	US 11 north / PA 533 east (East King Street)	North end of US 11/PA 533 overlap
Cumberland	Newburg	13.885	22.346	PA 641 east (West Main Street) – Newville, Carlisle	South end of PA 641 overlap
Cumberland	Newburg	13.930	22.418	PA 641 west (West Main Street) – Roxbury	North end of PA 641 overlap
Cumberland	Hopewell Township	16.017	25.777	PA 997 (Enola Road) – Roxbury	Northern terminus
1.000 mi = 1.609 km; 1.000 km = 0.621 mi: Concurrency terminus; Incomplete access
