= Muddy Run (Conodoguinet Creek tributary) =

River

Coordinates: 40.071493°N 77.597111°W

Muddy Run is a 12.6-mile-long (20.3 km) tributary of the Conodoguinet Creek in Franklin County, Pennsylvania in the United States.

The 4.4-mile-long (7.1 km) tributary Rowe Run joins Muddy Run southeast of Orrstown.

The 5.3-mile-long (8.5 km) tributary Lehman Run joins the Muddy Run near Pleasant Hall, Pennsylvania.

The headwaters begin in the Letterkenny Army Depot. Muddy Run joins the Conodoguinet near Orrstown.

== See also ==
- List of rivers of Pennsylvania
