= Newburg, Cumberland County, Pennsylvania =

Borough in Pennsylvania, US

- Borough
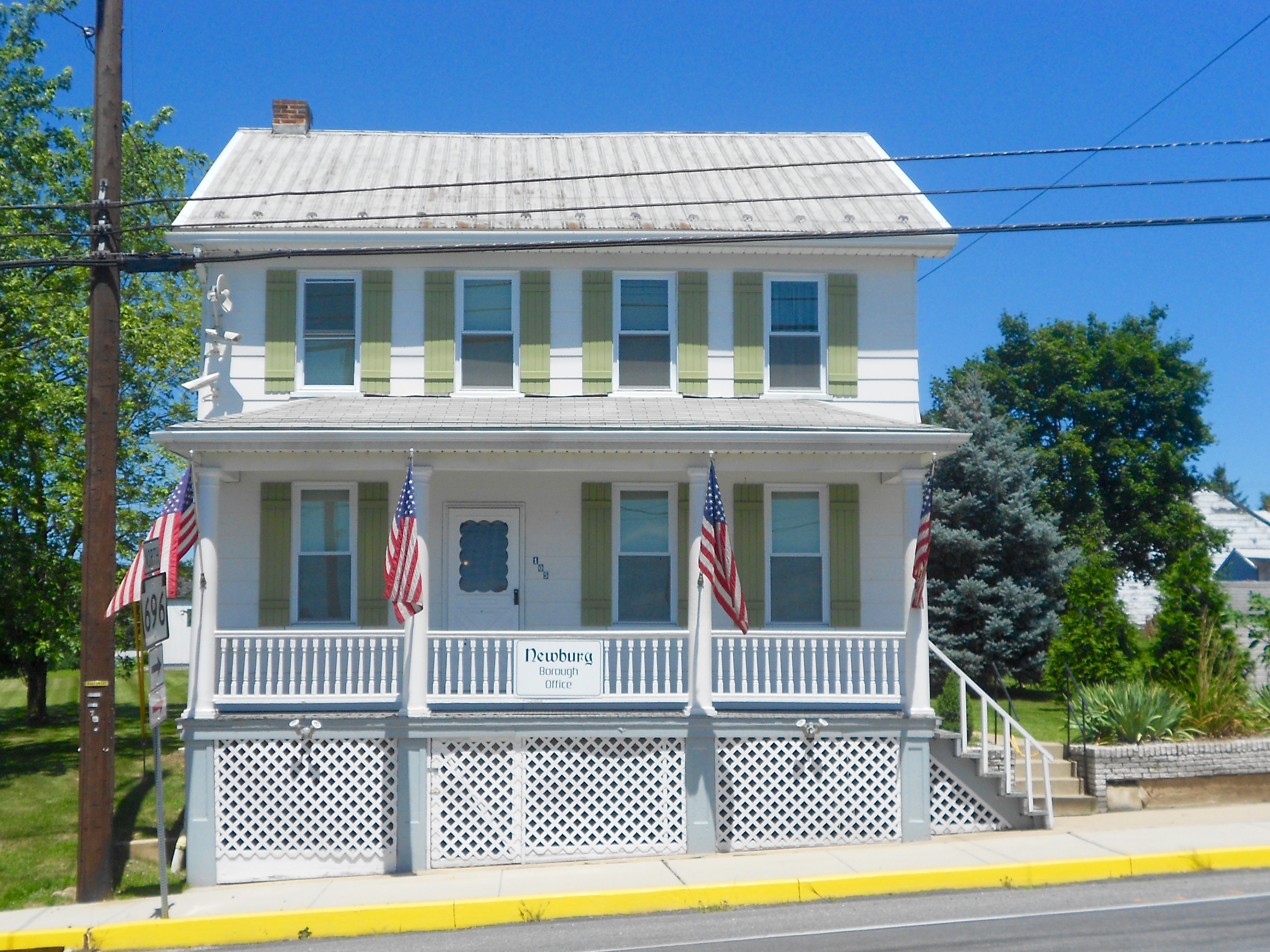
- Borough office

- Seal

- Location of Newburg in Cumberland County, Pennsylvania

- Location in Pennsylvania and the United States Newburg (the United States)
- Coordinates: 40°08′15″N 77°33′21″W
- Country: United States
- State: Pennsylvania
- County: Cumberland

Government
  - Type: Borough Council

Area
  - Total: 0.19 sq mi (0.48 km^{2})
  - Land: 0.19 sq mi (0.48 km^{2})
  - Water: 0 sq mi (0.00 km^{2})
- Elevation: 594 ft (181 m)

Population (2020)
  - Total: 364
  - Density: 1,971.8/sq mi (761.31/km^{2})
- Time zone: UTC-5 (Eastern (EST))
  - Summer (DST): UTC-4 (EDT)
- ZIP Code: 17240
- Area code: 717
- FIPS code: 42-53344
- GNIS feature ID: 1215151
- Website: www.newburgborough.com

Newburg is a borough in Cumberland County, Pennsylvania, United States. The population was 364 at the 2020 census. It is part of the Harrisburg–Carlisle metropolitan statistical area.

== Geography ==
Newburg is located in western Cumberland County at 40°8′15″N 77°33′21″W (40.137528, -77.555696). It is surrounded by Hopewell Township, a separate municipality. Pennsylvania Route 641 passes through the borough, leading east 9 miles (14 km) to Newville and west 6 miles (10 km) to Roxbury. Pennsylvania Route 696 crosses PA 641 on the west side of town and leads south 6 miles (10 km) to Shippensburg. To the northwest, via PA 696 and then Pennsylvania Route 997, it is 4 miles (6 km) to Exit 201 on the Pennsylvania Turnpike (Interstate 76).

According to the U.S. Census Bureau, the borough has a total area of 0.19 square miles (0.48 km^{2}), all land.

== Demographics ==
Historical population
Census	Pop.	Note	%±
1870	392		—
1880	433		10.5%
1890	376		−13.2%
1900	340		−9.6%
1910	264		−22.4%
1920	180		−31.8%
1930	222		23.3%
1940	278		25.2%
1950	289		4.0%
1960	283		−2.1%
1970	320		13.1%
1980	303		−5.3%
1990	312		3.0%
2000	372		19.2%
2010	336		−9.7%
2020	364		8.3%

As of the 2000 census, there were 372 people, 142 households, and 112 families residing in the borough. The population density was 1,458.1 inhabitants per square mile (563.0/km^{2}). There were 148 housing units at an average density of 580.1 units per square mile (224.0 units/km^{2}). The racial makeup of the borough was 97.04% White, 2.69% Native American, and 0.27% from two or more races.

There were 142 households, out of which 40.8% had children under the age of 18 living with them, 70.4% were married couples living together, 7.7% had a female householder with no husband present, and 21.1% were non-families. 18.3% of all households were made up of individuals, and 7.7% had someone living alone who was 65 years of age or older. The average household size was 2.62 and the average family size was 3.00.

In the borough, the population was spread out, with 27.2% under the age of 18, 5.6% from 18 to 24, 29.8% from 25 to 44, 22.8% from 45 to 64, and 14.5% who were 65 years of age or older. The median age was 37 years. For every 100 females, there were 88.8 males. For every 100 females age 18 and over, there were 85.6 males.

The median income for a household in the borough was $38,000, and the median income for a family was $44,250. Males had a median income of $34,722 versus $23,333 for females. The per capita income for the borough was $19,950. About 4.9% of families and 5.6% of the population were below the poverty line, including 4.5% of those under age 18 and 12.9% of those age 65 or over.
