= DC-1 (disambiguation) =

DC-1 or DC1 may refer to:

- Douglas DC-1, an American airliner design
- Pirs (ISS module), also known as DC-1 (Docking Compartment 1)
- C0 and C1 control codes#DC1, computer control codes
