= Carl Cover =

American aviator (1893–1944)

Carl Anson Cover
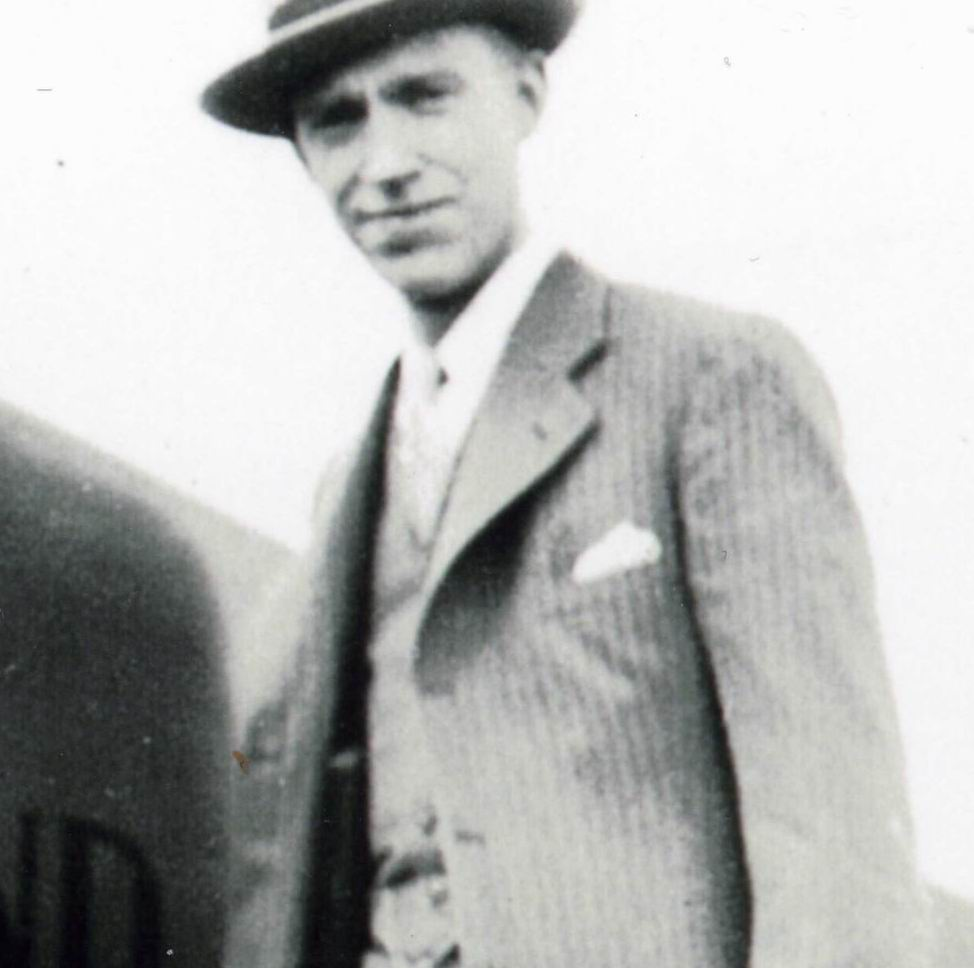
- Photo Courtesy of Hawaiian Airlines Archives
- Born: 26 April 1893; Roxbury, Pennsylvania, US
- Died: 27 November 1944 (aged 51); Dayton, Ohio, US
- Cause of death: Plane Crash
- Known for: Test Pilot/Aero-Space Executive
- Spouse: Mina "Minette" Jeanette Miller
- Children: 2
- Aviation career
- Famous flights: First test flight for the DC-1, DC-2, DC-3, DC-4, DC-5
- Air force: United States Army Air Service; United States Army Air Corps; United States Army Air Forces
- Battles: World War I World War II
- Rank: Colonel

Carl Anson Cover (26 April 1893 – 27 November 1944) was the chief test pilot and first to fly the Douglas Aircraft Company DC-1, DC-2, DC-3, DC-4, and the DC-5 airliners. Cover became Senior Vice President and general manager for Douglas Aircraft and later Vice President of Bell Aircraft.

== Early life ==
Cover was born on 26 April 1893, to Hugh and Helen Cover in Roxbury, Pennsylvania. He attended high school in Harrisburg, Pennsylvania and worked as a millwright machinist at Bethlehem Steel, where his father was a foreman. Cover had three younger sisters, Margaret, Mary, and Anna.

== Aviation career ==
=== US Army Air Service ===
Cover enlisted in the US Army on 1 August 1917, and was sent to Kelly Field in San Antonio for pilot training. He was initially assigned to the 50th Aero Squadron, but was transferred to the 110th Aero Squadron later that same month. Cover was sent to the Military School of Aeronautics at UC Berkeley in November 1917. He was commissioned as a Lieutenant in June 1918, and was assigned to Brooks Field as an instructor. In 1923, Cover was stationed at Langley Field in Virginia.

=== Inter-Island Airways ===
In 1929, Cover was flying for the Army Reserves in Honolulu, Hawaii. He was approached by Stanley Kennedy Sr. to be the Operations Manager and first employee for his start-up airline Inter-Island Airways (re-named Hawaiian Airlines in 1941). Kennedy was impressed by his background as an Army test pilot and his history of aero-engineering work. One of Cover's initial tasks was to fly Inter-Island Airways' first airplane, a Bellanca Pacemaker, from Delaware to San Francisco where it was shipped to Hawaii. Cover and Kennedy hired Navy pilot Charles Elliott as Chief Pilot. Cover, Kennedy, and Elliott, all being WWI veterans, decided on Armistice Day to be the inaugural scheduled airline flight between the Hawaiian Islands. On 11 November 1929, Elliott and Cover flew Inter-Island Airways' Sikorsky S-38 amphibious seaplanes in formation from Honolulu to Maui, then on to Hilo, introducing air travel to the residents and visitors of Hawaii.

=== Douglas Aircraft Company ===
Major Cover left the Army and Inter-Island Airways in 1930 to become a test pilot for the Douglas Aircraft Company in Santa Monica, California. He soon became the Chief Test Pilot and Vice President of Sales, and eventually Senior Vice President and general manager of Douglas Aircraft.

In 1931, a TWA Fokker F-10 tri-motor airplane had a fatal crash killing Notre Dame University football coach Knute Rockne. The cause of the crash was failure of the wooden wing spar. TWA's Jack Frye lead the campaign for aircraft manufacturers to develop rugged airliners using metal construction. Douglas Aircraft responded to this request with the DC-1.

On 1 July 1933, Cover flew the first test flight of the DC-1. Shortly after take-off both engines quit; Cover pushed the nose over and the engines re-started. Cover safely managed to get the airplane back on the ground after a short 12-minute flight, to find the carburetors had been installed backwards.

After TWA gained experience with the DC-1, they created a list of improvements for the airliner resulting in the creation of the DC-2. On 11 May 1934, Cover flew the first test flight of the DC-2. The DC-2 was a commercial success, selling 198 aircraft.

American Airlines approached Douglas Aircraft with more improvements for the DC-2. American wanted an aircraft that was bigger, could fly farther, and wide enough to accommodate sleeping berths. These design changes lead to the DC-3. On 17 December 1935, Cover flew the first test flight of the DC-3. The DC-3 is credited as one of the most significant airliners ever produced, helping create the modern airline industry and aid the Allies victory in World War II. There were over 16,000 DC-3's and military version C-47's built.

On 7 June 1938, Cover flew the first test flight of the four-engine DC-4. Two days later, Cover flew the plane on a demonstration flight for United Airlines with Orville Wright onboard. The prototype DC-4 had three tail-fins and was overly complex for airlines to make a profit. The plane was re-engineered with one tail-fin, simplified systems and entered service in 1942. Douglas built 1,241 civilian and military versions of the DC-4. The prototype was renamed the DC-4E for experimental.

On 20 February 1939 Cover flew the first test flight of the DC-5. There were only 12 DC-5's built, and it has been called "The Forgotten Douglas."

=== World War II and Bell Aircraft ===
During World War II, General Hap Arnold requested that Cover return to active duty and help with the production and testing of the B-29 Superfortress. Cover was made Colonel and put in charge of United States Air Force Plant 6 at Dobbins Air Force Base in Marietta, Georgia. Plant 6 was subcontracted to Bell Aircraft for the production of the B-29 under license of Boeing. He was released from active duty in August 1944.

In September 1944, Cover accepted an offer from Bell Aircraft as Vice President and the civilian general manager of Plant 6.

== Death and honors ==
On 27 November 1944, Cover died in a plane crash while trying to land during a snow storm in Dayton, Ohio. He is buried at the Forest Lawn Memorial Park in Glendale, California.

Cover Street in the Douglas Industrial Park at the Long Beach Airport is named in his honor.

Lawrence Bell, founder of Bell Aircraft, said about Cover, "In my opinion no single individual in the aircraft industry has contributed more to commercial and military aviation than Carl Cover. His abilities encompass all phases from engineering and flight test to sales direction and over-all organization."
