= Orrstown, Pennsylvania =

Borough in Pennsylvania, US

- Borough
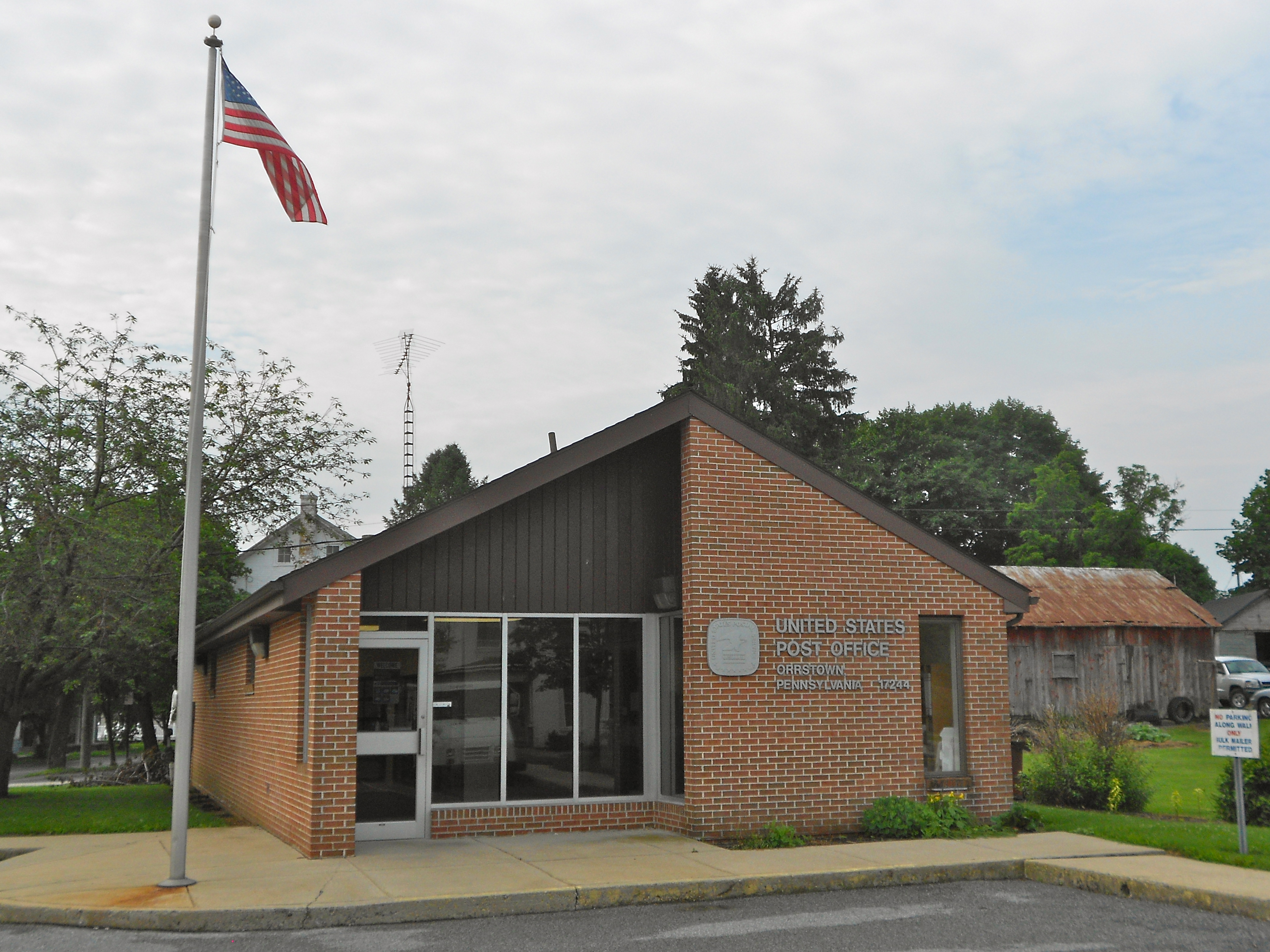
- Orrstown Post Office

- Location of Orrstown in Franklin County, Pennsylvania.

- Location within Pennsylvania Location within the United States
- Coordinates: 40°03′32″N 77°36′29″W
- Country: United States
- State: Pennsylvania
- County: Franklin
- Settled: 1833

Government
  - Type: Borough Council

Area
  - Total: 0.062 sq mi (0.16 km^{2})
  - Land: 0.062 sq mi (0.16 km^{2})
  - Water: 0 sq mi (0.00 km^{2})
- Elevation: 676 ft (206 m)

Population (2020)
  - Total: 214
- Time zone: UTC-5 (Eastern (EST))
  - Summer (DST): UTC-4 (EDT)
- ZIP code: 17244
- Area code: 717
- FIPS code: 42-57112
- GNIS feature ID: 1215247

Orrstown is a borough in Franklin County, Pennsylvania, United States. The population was 214 at the 2020 census.

== History ==
Orrstown was founded in 1919 by the Orr brothers. It is surrounded by Southampton Township in Franklin County, on the old state road from Shippensburg to Upper Strasburg. Settlements were made in that neighborhood as early as 1738. Before the completion of the Pennsylvania Railroad, horses and cattle were annually driven down the state road (now Pennsylvania Route 533/Orrstown Road) to eastern markets. The town was laid out in 1833, by John, William and James Orr. At first, they called it "Southampton", after the township; but in 1835, when application was made for a post office to be called Southampton, the Post Office Department refused because there was already a post office of that name. George Chambers, who represented the area in Congress, named the post office "Orrstown", and the name has since been attached to the town.

It was incorporated as a borough on May 3, 1847, and in 1878 the town had one hotel, two stores, one carriage factory, and four churches: Lutheran, Presbyterian, United Brethren and Winebrennerian. The populations was then 325.

== Geography ==
Orrstown is located in northeastern Franklin County at the intersection of Pennsylvania Routes 433 (Rowe Run Road) and 533 (Orrstown Road). PA 433 leads northwestward 5 miles (8 km) to Roxbury and south 5 miles to the Letterkenny Army Depot. Chambersburg, the county seat, is 11 miles (18 km) to the south via PA 433 and U.S. Route 11. PA 533 leads east five miles to Shippensburg and west 6 miles (10 km) to Upper Strasburg.

According to the United States Census Bureau, the borough has a total area of 0.06 square miles (0.16 km^{2}), all land. The borough sits on a low ridge between Conodoguinet Creek to the north and its tributary, Muddy Run to the south.

== Demographics ==
Historical population
Census	Pop.	Note	%±
1860	356		—
1870	305		−14.3%
1880	302		−1.0%
1890	262		−13.2%
1910	247		—
1920	217		−12.1%
1930	211		−2.8%
1940	294		39.3%
1950	295		0.3%
1960	318		7.8%
1970	262		−17.6%
1980	247		−5.7%
1990	220		−10.9%
2000	231		5.0%
2010	262		13.4%
2020	214		−18.3%

As of the census of 2000, there were 231 people, 79 households, and 59 families residing in the borough. The population density was 3,714.2 inhabitants per square mile (1,434.1/km^{2}). There were 85 housing units at an average density of 1,366.7 per square mile (527.7/km^{2}). The racial makeup of the borough was 99.57% White, 0.43% from other races. Hispanic or Latino of any race were 0.43% of the population.

There were 79 households, out of which 32.9% had children under the age of 18 living with them, 65.8% were married couples living together, 3.8% had a female householder with no husband present, and 24.1% were non-families. 17.7% of all households were made up of individuals, and 8.9% had someone living alone who was 65 years of age or older. The average household size was 2.67 and the average family size was 2.98.

In the borough the population was spread out, with 24.7% under the age of 18, 9.1% from 18 to 24, 27.7% from 25 to 44, 18.6% from 45 to 64, and 19.9% who were 65 years of age or older. The median age was 38 years. For every 100 females there were 958 males. For every 100 females age 18 and over, there were 851 males.

The median income for a household in the borough was $38,542, and the median income for a family was $39,583. Males had a median income of $27,188 versus $21,250 for females. The per capita income for the borough was $14,346. None of the families and 1.4% of the population were living below the poverty line.
