= Scotland, Pennsylvania =

Unincorporated community in Pennsylvania, US

- Census-designated place
- Location within Pennsylvania Location within the United States
- Coordinates: 39°57′58″N 77°35′44″W
- Country: United States
- State: Pennsylvania
- County: Franklin
- Township: Greene
- Elevation: 725 ft (221 m)

Population (2020)
  - Total: 1,353
  - Density: 1,693/sq mi (653.6/km^{2})
- Time zone: UTC-5 (Eastern (EST))
  - Summer (DST): UTC-4 (EDT)
- ZIP code: 17254
- Area code: 717
- FIPS code: 42-68376
- GNIS feature ID: 2633813

Scotland is an unincorporated community and census-designated place (CDP) in Greene Township, Franklin County, Pennsylvania, United States. The community was named after Scotland, the ancestral home of an early settler. As of the 2010 census, the population was 1,353.

The Chambersburg Mall is located in the area, next to the Scotland exit of I-81. The Scotland School for Veterans' Children was long part of the community.

== Geography ==
Scotland is located in eastern Franklin County, near the center of Greene Township. Interstate 81 passes through the southeastern side of the community, with access from Exit 20. I-81 leads southwest 5 miles (8 km) to Chambersburg, the county seat, and northeast 27 miles (43 km) to Carlisle. Pennsylvania Route 997 passes along the northeastern edge of the community, leading northwest 2 miles (3 km) to U.S. Route 11 at Green Village, and southeast 6 miles (10 km) between Fayetteville and Caledonia State Park.

Conococheague Creek, a tributary of the Potomac River, forms the southwestern edge of the community.

== Scotland School for Veterans' Children ==
The Scotland School for Veterans' Children was located in Scotland until Governor Rendell forced the school to close in 2009 by eliminating the state funding.

Scotland was originally built as a school for orphaned children shortly after the Civil War. It was then converted into a school for children in grades 3-12 that had family members in the military.

== Geology ==
The type section of the Conococheague Formation, a Cambrian limestone and dolomite, is located in Scotland.

== See also ==
- Chambersburg, Pennsylvania: Scotland School for Veterans' Children
