= Douglas DC-1 =

Piston airliner

DC-1
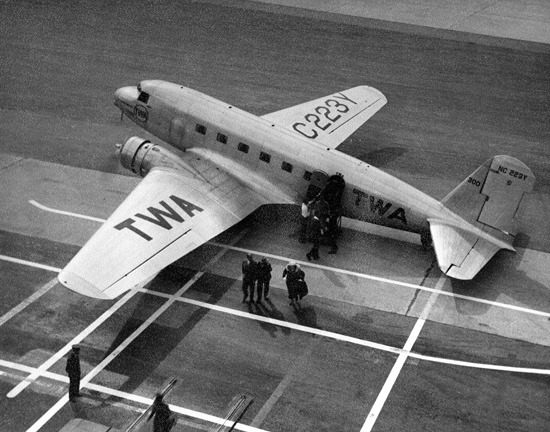
- Douglas DC-1 on its handover to Transcontinental & Western Air (predecessor to Trans World Airlines) in December 1933

General information
- Type: Prototype airliner
- Manufacturer: Douglas Aircraft Company
- Status: Destroyed
- Primary user: Transcontinental & Western Air
- Number built: 1

History
- Introduction date: December 1933
- First flight: July 1, 1933
- Developed into: Douglas DC-2

The Douglas DC-1 was the first model of the famous American DC (Douglas Commercial) commercial transport aircraft series. Although only one example of the DC-1 was produced, the design was the basis for the DC-2 and DC-3, the latter being one of the most successful aircraft in the history of aviation.

== Design and development ==
Development of the DC-1 can be traced back to the 1931 crash of a TWA airliner, a Fokker F-10 trimotor in which a wing failed, likely because water had seeped between the layers of the wood laminate and dissolved the glue holding the layers together. Following the accident, the Aeronautics Branch of the U.S. Department of Commerce placed stringent restrictions on the use of wooden wings on passenger airliners. Boeing developed an answer, the 247, a twin-engined all-metal monoplane with a retractable undercarriage, but their production capacity was reserved to meet the needs of United Airlines, part of United Aircraft and Transport Corporation which also owned Boeing. TWA needed a similar aircraft to respond to competition from the Boeing 247 and they asked five manufacturers to bid for construction of a three-engined, 12-seat aircraft of all-metal construction, capable of flying 1,080 mi (1,740 km) at 150 mph (242 km/h). The most demanding part of the specification was that the airliner would have to be capable of safely taking off from any airport on TWA's main routes (and in particular Albuquerque, at high altitude and with severe summer temperatures) with one engine non-functioning.

Donald Douglas was initially reluctant to participate in the invitation from TWA. He doubted that there would be a market for 100 aircraft, the number of sales necessary to cover development costs. Nevertheless, he submitted a design consisting of an all-metal, low-wing, twin-engined aircraft seating 12 passengers, a crew of two and a flight attendant. The aircraft exceeded the specifications of TWA even with only two engines, principally through the use of controllable pitch propellers. It was insulated against noise, heated, and fully capable of both flying and performing a controlled takeoff or landing on one engine.

Donald Douglas stated in 1935 that the first DC-1 cost $325,000 to design and build.

== Operational history ==
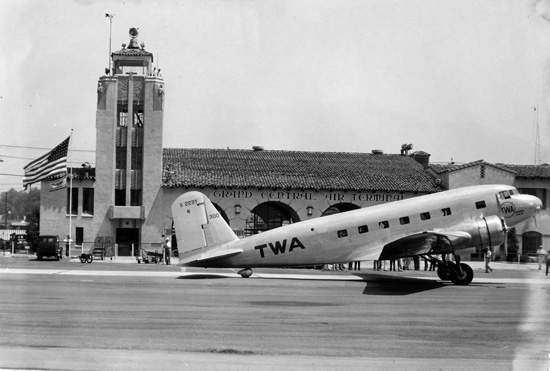
DC-1 in TWA markings

Only one aircraft was produced. The prototype first flew on July 1, 1933, flown by Carl Cover. It was given the model name DC-1, or Douglas Commercial Model 1. During a half-year of testing, it performed more than 200 test flights and demonstrated its superiority over the most-used airliners at that time, the Ford Trimotor and Fokker Trimotor. It was flown across the United States on February 19, 1934, making the journey in the record time of 13 hours 5 minutes.

TWA accepted the aircraft on 15 September 1933 with a few modifications (mainly increasing seating to 14 passengers and adding more powerful engines) and subsequently ordered 20 examples of the developed production model which was named the Douglas DC-2.

The DC-1 was sold to Lord Forbes in the United Kingdom in May 1938, who operated it for a few months before selling it in France in October 1938. It was then sold to Líneas Aéreas Postales Españolas (L.A.P.E.) in Spain in November 1938 and was also used by the Spanish Republican Air Force as a transport aircraft. It was later operated by Iberia Airlines from July 1939 with the name Negrón; it force-landed at Málaga Airport, Spain, on October 4, 1940 and was damaged beyond repair.

== Specifications (DC-1) ==
Data from McDonnell Douglas Aircraft since 1920

General characteristics

- Crew: 2 pilots
- Capacity: 12 passengers
- Length: 60 ft 0 in (18.29 m)
- Wingspan: 85 ft 0 in (25.91 m)
- Height: 16 ft 0 in (4.88 m)
- Wing area: 942 sq ft (87.5 m^{2})
- Airfoil: root: NACA 2215; tip: NACA 2209
- Empty weight: 11,780 lb (5,343 kg)
- Gross weight: 17,500 lb (7,938 kg)
- Powerplant: 2 × Wright SGR-1820F3 Cyclone 9-cylinder air-cooled radial piston engines, 690 hp (510 kW) each
- Propellers: 3-bladed variable-pitch metal propellers

Performance

- Maximum speed: 210 mph (340 km/h, 180 kn)
- Cruise speed: 190 mph (310 km/h, 170 kn) at 8,000 ft (2,400 m)
- Range: 1,000 mi (1,600 km, 870 nmi)
- Service ceiling: 23,000 ft (7,000 m)

== See also ==
Related development

- Douglas DC-2
- Douglas DC-3

Aircraft of comparable role, configuration, and era

- Boeing 247

Related lists

- List of civil aircraft
