= Greenwood, Franklin County, Pennsylvania =

Unincorporated community in Pennsylvania, U.S.

Coordinates: 39°54′21″N 77°31′10″W

Greenwood is an unincorporated community in Franklin County, in the U.S. state of Pennsylvania.

== History ==
A variant name of Greenwood was "Black's Gap", after Robert Black, a pioneer settler. A post office called Black's Gap was established in 1869, and remained in operation until 1930.
