= Spring Run, Pennsylvania =

Unincorporated community in Pennsylvania, US

- Unincorporated community
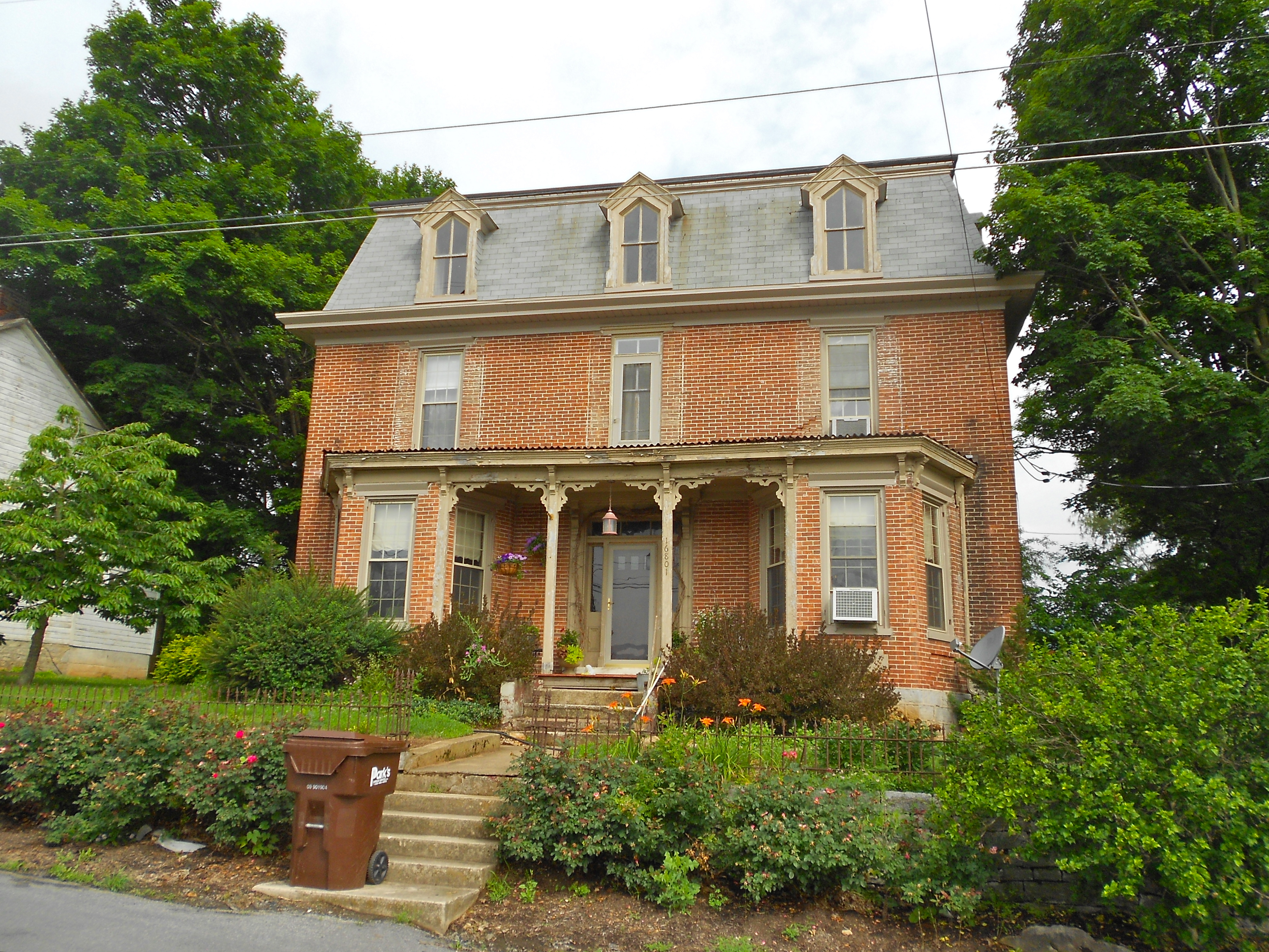
- House in Spring Run

- Location within Pennsylvania Location within the United States
- Coordinates: 40°8′31″N 77°46′25″W
- Country: United States
- State: Pennsylvania
- County: Franklin
- Township: Fannett
- Elevation: 840 ft (260 m)
- Time zone: UTC-5 (Eastern (EST))
  - Summer (DST): UTC-4 (EDT)
- ZIP code: 17262
- Area code: 717
- GNIS feature ID: 1188253

Spring Run is an unincorporated community in Fannett Township in Franklin County, Pennsylvania, United States. Spring Run is located at the intersection of state routes 75 and 641, west of Roxbury.

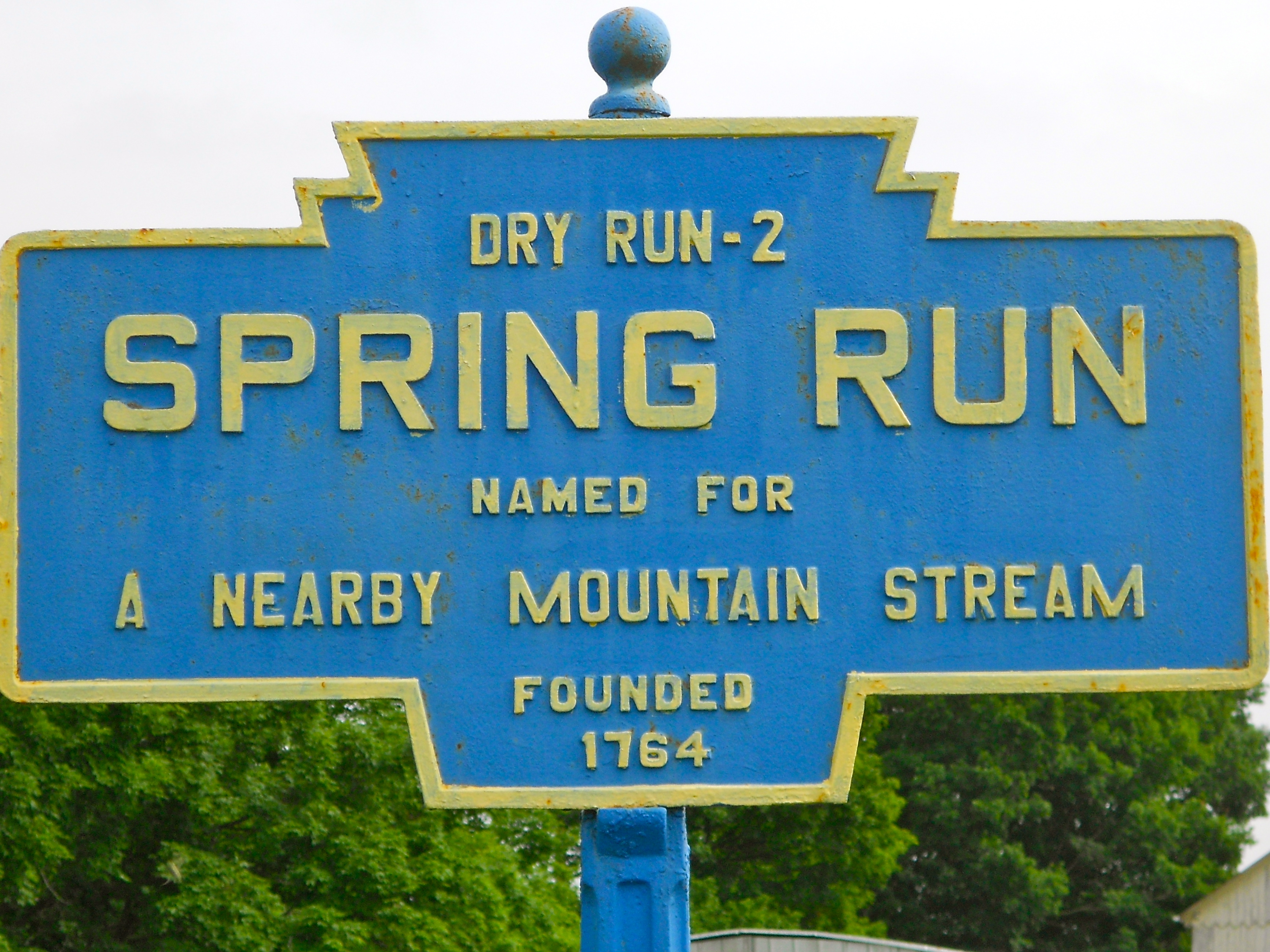
Keystone Marker
