= Lurgan, Pennsylvania =

Unincorporated community in Pennsylvania, US

- Unincorporated community
- Location within Pennsylvania
- Coordinates: 40°05′38″N 77°37′52″W
- Country: United States
- State: Pennsylvania
- County: Franklin
- Elevation: 735 ft (224 m)
- Time zone: UTC-5 (Eastern (EST))
  - Summer (DST): UTC-4 (EDT)
- ZIP code: 17232
- Area codes: 223 & 717
- GNIS feature ID: 1180081

Lurgan is an unincorporated community in Lurgan Township in northern Franklin County, Pennsylvania, United States. The community is 6.6 miles (10.6 km) west-northwest of Shippensburg. Lurgan has a post office, with ZIP code 17232.
