= Pleasant Hall, Pennsylvania =

Unincorporated community in Pennsylvania, US

- Unincorporated community
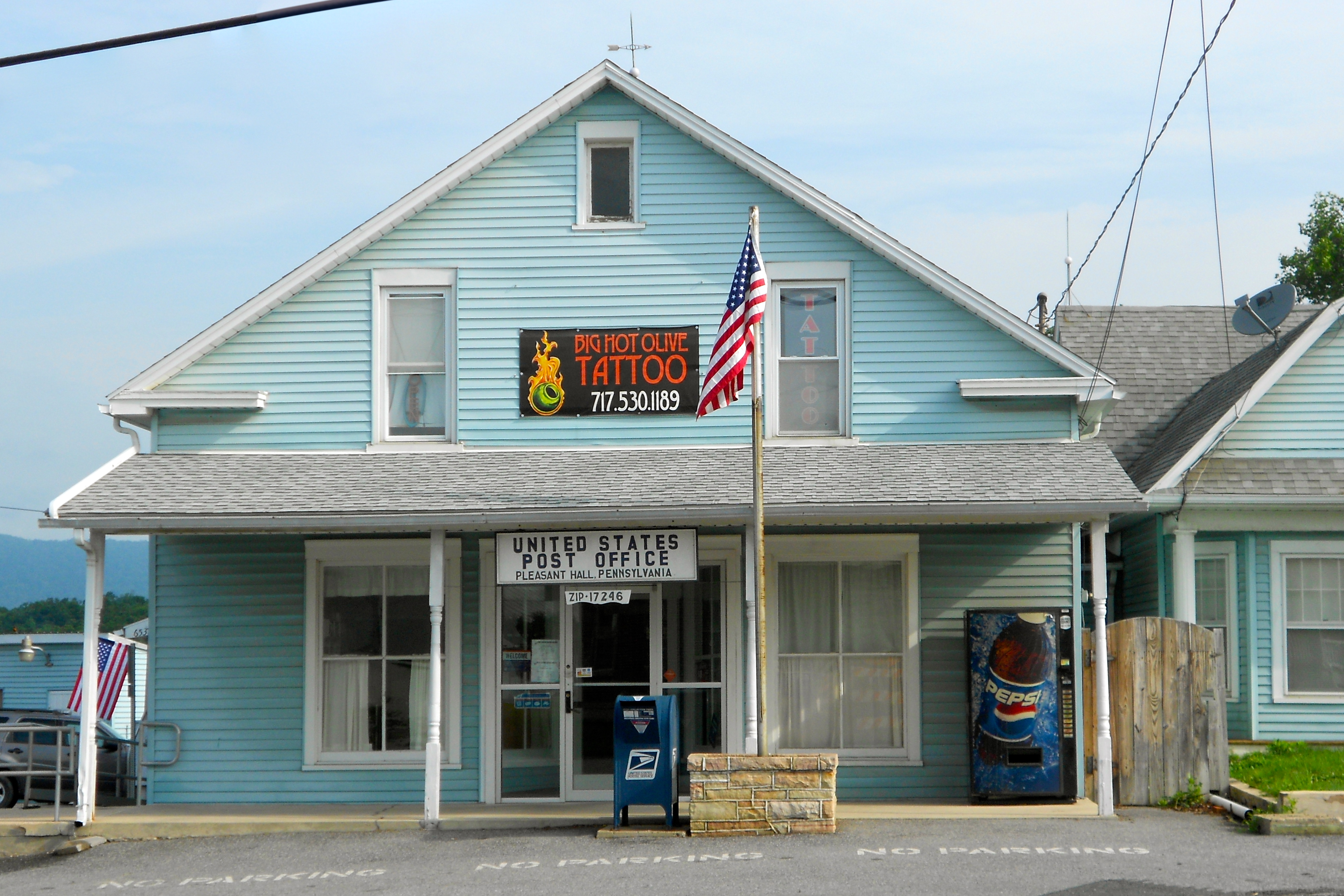
- Post office

- Location within Pennsylvania Location within the United States
- Coordinates: 40°3′11″N 77°39′14″W
- Country: United States
- State: Pennsylvania
- County: Franklin
- Township: Letterkenny
- Elevation: 705 ft (215 m)
- Time zone: UTC-5 (Eastern (EST))
  - Summer (DST): UTC-4 (EDT)
- ZIP code: 17246
- Area code: 717
- GNIS feature ID: 1184018

Pleasant Hall is an unincorporated community in Letterkenny Township in Franklin County, Pennsylvania, United States. Pleasant Hall is located at the intersection of state routes 533 and 997, north of Chambersburg and northeast of the Letterkenny Army Depot.

The Pleasant Hill ZIP code 17246 covers 1.63 sq mi (4.2 km^{2}) and a population of 195.

Pleasant Hall was platted circa 1840. A post office called Pleasant Hall has been in operation since 1851.
