= Cumberland Valley Rail Trail =

Rail trail in Pennsylvania, United States

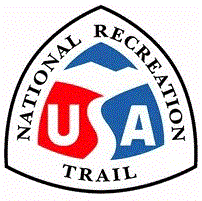
- Length: 13 miles (21 km)
- Location: Cumberland County, Pennsylvania
- Designation: National Recreation Trail
- Trailheads: Shippensburg; Newville
- Use: Hiking, biking, horseback riding
- Difficulty: Easy, level, ADA accessible
- Surface: Crushed stone

Cumberland Valley Rail Trail (CVRT) is a National Recreation Trail rail trail that follows the former Cumberland Valley Railroad corridor for 9.5 miles in Cumberland County, Pennsylvania. CVRT travels through the farmlands from Shippensburg to Newville.

== Historical development ==
Historical significance

The Cumberland Valley Railroad (CVR) began service in the Cumberland Valley on the current CVRT corridor in 1837. In 1838 CV was the first railroad in the U.S. to offer overnight sleeping cars. Twenty years later, John Brown and his abolitionist compatriots traveled to Harpers Ferry on CVR to stage their famous raid. After the Civil War began, CVR played a strategically important role by transporting Union troops to the Shenandoah Valley. CVR also served as a resupply route for Union troops. During the war Confederate forces destroyed various sections of CVR roadbed.

Trail history

CVR became part of the Conrail (CR) network in 1975. CR donated the corridor to Cumberland Valley Rails-to-Trails Council (CVRTC) in 1995. The first 4.5 miles of trail was completed in the fall of 2004, followed by five additional miles two years later.

== Trail development ==
Design and construction

The majority of the trail's ten-foot-wide walking-biking path consists of crushed, then packed limestone. The trail becomes macadam at the eight secondary road crossings which are all and marked with perpendicular crossing angles. The trail is wheelchair accessible and all road crossings meet ADA specifications. A grassy bridle path parallels the pedestrian path the entire route of the trail.

Trail amenities

Parking, restroom facilities, and picnic areas are located in Shippensburg Township Park trailhead at the CVRT's western terminus and at the Newville trailhead at the CVRT's eastern terminus. Access to the trail near its midpoint, is provided at the Oakville trailhead . There are also several park benches located along the route where trail users can rest.

== Community ==
Trail supporters

The CVRT is managed and maintained by the Cumberland Valley Rails-to-Trail Council (CVRTC). The CVRTC is an all-volunteer, non-profit, 501(c)(3) charitable corporation dedicated to conservation, historic preservation, recreation, and alternative transportation through the development of multi-use trails along former railroad corridors and other areas. In addition to state and federal funding and dues collected from local members of the CVRTC, the following local and community organizations have provided funding and in-kind support for the CVRT:

- Shippensburg Area United Way and Unitarian Universalists of Cumberland Valley (funding)
- Boy Scouts with the New Birth of Freedom Council (construction, maintenance, and several special Eagle Scout projects)
- Newville Borough; North Newton and Shippensburg Townships (construction and maintenance)
- Cumberland County (equipment)
- West Pennsboro Township (construction)
- Carlisle Area Health & Wellness Foundation (funding)
- PA Dept. of Conservation and Natural Resources (funding)
- Shippensburg Borough (trail support)
- Southampton Township (trail maintenance)

Special events

Each spring the CVRT stages its annual “Race, Run, Ride & Ramble” from the Shippensburg Township Park trail head. This event includes a 15km hike, a 30km bike ride, and runs of 5km and 15km. Each fall the CVRT stages its annual “Fall Down on the Trail” from the Newville trailhead. This event includes a 5km race and 4 mile hike. Other walks and rides on the trail have been organized by the following organizations:

- Carlisle Parks & Recreation Department and the Carlisle Area Health & Wellness Foundation (walks)
- Big Spring School District students (annual dog walk to benefit the Humane Society)
- The Kings Gap Environmental Education Center (bike rides)

== Gallery ==
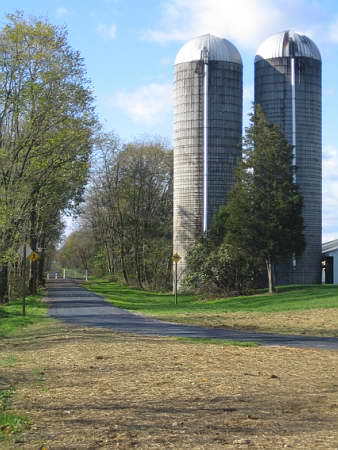
The Cumberland Valley Rail Trail winds its way through the farmlands of western Cumberland County, PA.

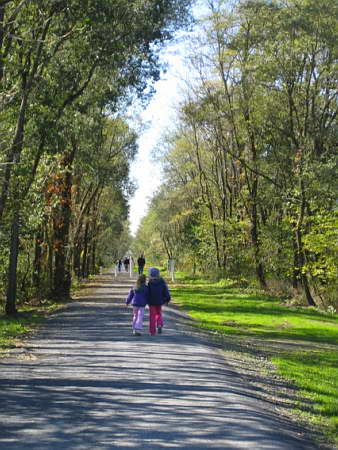
The Cumberland Valley Rail Trail heading west from Newville

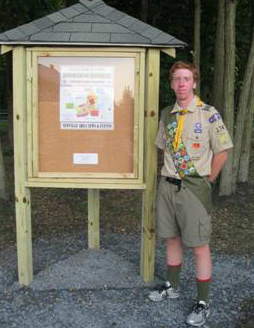
Doug Kennedy completed this information kiosk at the CVRT trailhead in Newville as his Eagle Scout project.

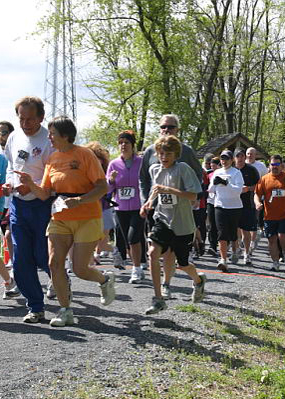
CVRTC's annual "Race, Run, Ride, and Ramble," Spring 2011
