= Letterkenny Army Depot =

Military base in Franklin County, Pennsylvania

Coordinates: 40°01′07″N 77°41′50″W

Letterkenny Army Depot (formerly, Letterkenny Ordnance Depot)
- Part of U.S. Army Aviation and Missile Command (AMCOM)
- Letterkenny Township, Pennsylvania
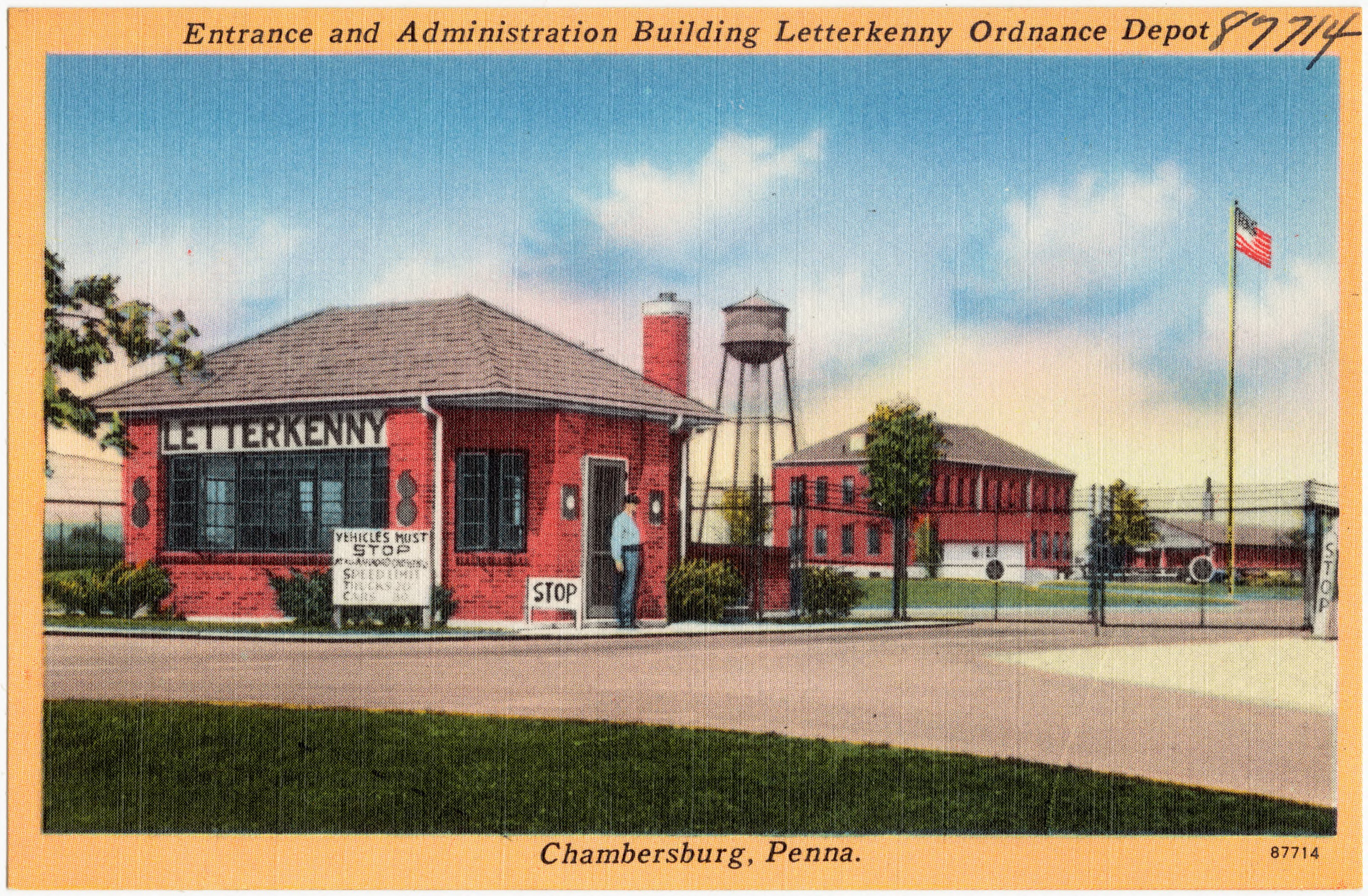

Site information
- Type: Maintenance, modification, storage, and demilitarization operations of tactical missiles and ammunition
- Owner: United States Army
- Condition: Operational

Site history
- Built: 1942

Letterkenny Army Depot (originally Letterkenny Ordnance Depot), the Center of Industrial and Technical Excellence (CITE) for Air Defense and Tactical Missile Systems, was established in early 1942. Its leadership began recruiting civilian personnel in July 1942.

The Depot is under the command structure of the U.S. Army Aviation and Missile Command (AMCOM). The facilities at Letterkenny are used to conduct maintenance, modification, storage, and demilitarization operations of tactical missiles and ammunition.

Located primarily in Letterkenny Township and extending into Greene Township and Hamilton Township, all in Franklin County, Pennsylvania, just northwest of the borough of Chambersburg, the Depot consists of nearly 18,000 acres (71 km^{2}). It is the largest employer in Franklin County, Pennsylvania, and adds over one-quarter of a billion dollars annually to the region's economy.

Letterkenny has unique tactical missile repair capabilities repairing a variety of Department of Defense (DoD) missile systems, including the MIM-104 PATRIOT missile and its ground support and radar equipment. More recently, Letterkenny expanded its product line to include designation of the CITE for Power Generation for the Army, the overhaul of tactical wheeled vehicles (HMMWVs), material handling equipment (7.5-ton cranes), and Mobile Kitchen Trailers. In 2007, during the Iraq conflict, Letterkenny began building new Mine Resistant Ambush Protected (MRAP) armored vehicles in partnership with BAE Systems, and in 2010 was designated the Joint Depot Source of Repair (JDSOR) for Route Clearance Vehicles for the DoD.

== History ==
=== 1940s − 1960s ===
In 1941, Letterkenny was chosen by the U.S. Department of War to be one of twelve new ordnance depots. On December 18, 1941, the Secretary of War, Henry L. Stimson, issued the directive to acquire 21,000 acres (85 km^{2}) at Letterkenny for a depot. The mission would be to reduce the surplus of forthcoming material and to store and ship ammunition, trucks, parts, and other supplies. Construction on the depot took place from January through April 1942.

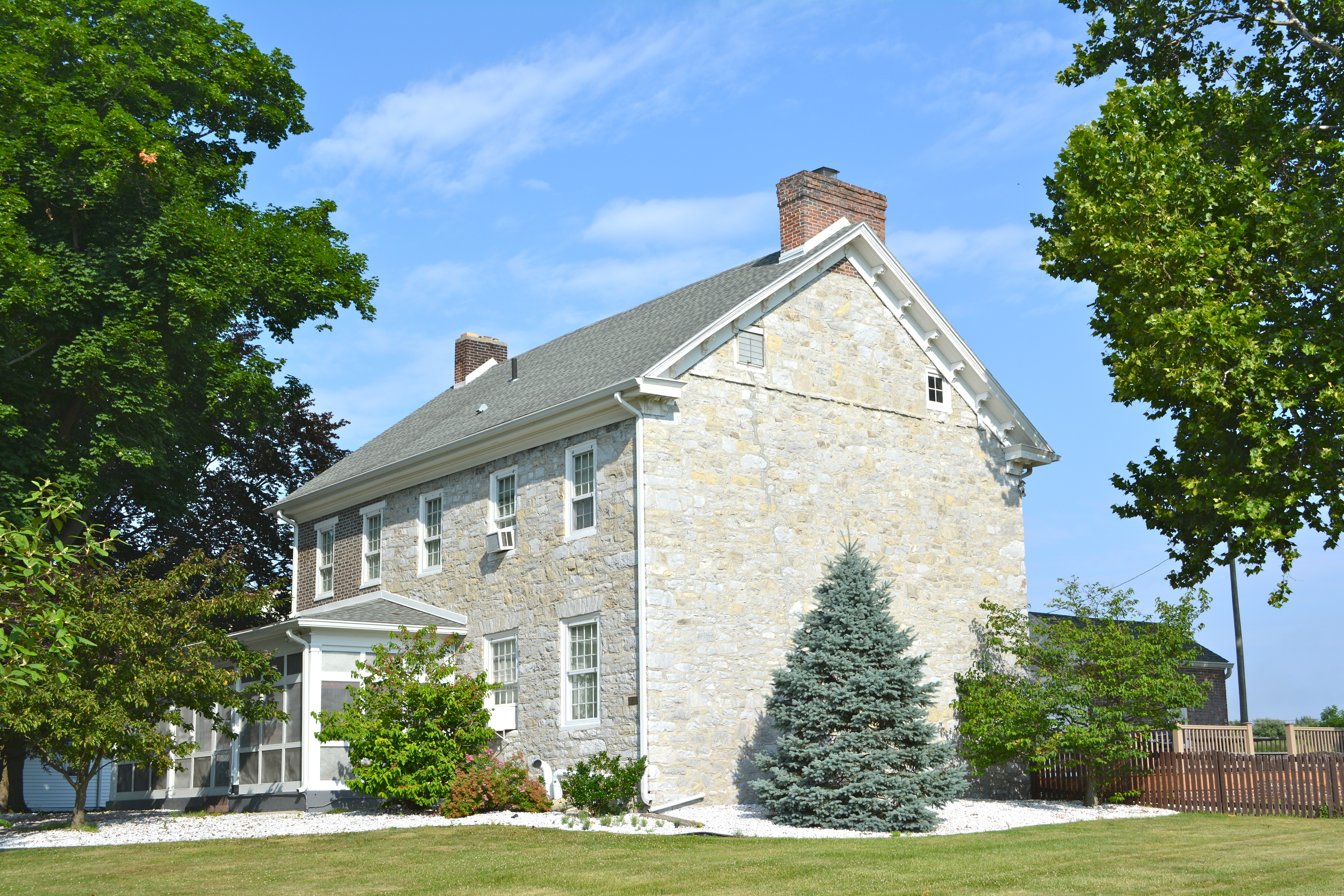
The historic James Finley House, Building No. 505, Letterkenny Army Depot, serves as the post commander's residence

In addition, the government obtained the James Finley House in 1942 for use as the Commanding Officer's Residence, making it one of the largest depots of its kind.

Depot military officers then began recruiting civilian personnel in July 1942.

The first shipment of ammunition arrived by train in late 1942, and more than three million tons of supplies were moved during World War II. Beginning in 1943, news was disseminated internally to civilian and military employees via a civilian-sponsored, weekly newsletter, the "Kenny Letter." In August 1945, newsletter editors marked the second anniversary of their publication and the war's end by producing a special "V-J edition" (Victory over Japan Day) with the word "Victory" printed in large, red lettering as the front-page headline. The depot also sponsored the Letterkenny Ordnance Depot Baseball Team (L.O.D.), a civilian group which participated in the Twilight Baseball League with teams from the Chambersburg Engineering Company (CECO) and the Pennsylvania Railroad (P.R.R.) in night games at Henninger Field in Chambersburg during the summers of 1943 and 1944. Joining the civilian team from the depot for the 1944 season were the CECO and P.R.R. teams, as well as new teams from St. Thomas High School and the U.S. Army's 831st Ordnance Company. The five teams participated in a forty-game schedule that summer. The P.R.R. Team defeated Letterkenny's civilian team 2–1 in the seventh game of the league's 1944 championship playoff on August 25.

In May 1944, military leaders at Letterkenny recommended building two hundred and fifty concrete slab aprons for igloos to make it easier and safer for depot personnel to move and store palletized ammunition and bombs via forklift.

After the war, an enormous amount of ammunition was returned from overseas, some of which was unserviceable and had to be destroyed. During the Korean War, with improved capabilities, Letterkenny took on the task and shifted to a wartime pace, increasing their workforce to 6,500 by adding as many as 50 new employees each day during their growth's peak. With new technologies in electronics and guided missile maintenance in the 1950s, the Depot saw a further increased workload. Newly trained employees began working on Project Nike missile components in 1953.

On July 1, 1954, Letterkenny Ordnance Depot became a permanent military installation. It was renamed Letterkenny Army Depot in August 1962 under the U.S. Army Materiel Command (AMC), and with the war in Vietnam, Letterkenny's missions again increased with greater materiel being funneled through the Depot. Its maintenance division became one of the largest activities, with 1,400 workers reconditioning artillery, combat vehicles, and guided missiles. Automation was also introduced at this time along with the update of several facilities. Soon after, in 1964, the 28th Ordnance Detachment moved from Fort Meade, Maryland, to Letterkenny, adding to their capabilities the disposal of explosive ordnance items including bombs, shells, rockets, and guided missiles. They also assisted police in the disposal of explosives and war souvenirs.

=== 1970s − 1990s ===
In the 1970s, command of Savanna Army Depot Activity, Illinois, fell under Letterkenny, and the U.S. Army Depot System Command (DESCOM) was established and headquartered there. DESCOM, a two-star command and major subordinate element of AMC, remained at the Depot until 1995. In 1974, Letterkenny's capabilities further expanded to include maintenance for the Air Tow Missile as well as long-term storage of war reserve stock packaged petroleum, oil and lubricants, and various chemicals and acids. By the late 1970s, the Depot was one of five installations in the United States to activate the Automated Multi-Media Exchange (AMME), leading to more effective communication service. Letterkenny was at that point the largest installation in Pennsylvania, with more than 5,400 workers.

During the 1980s and early 1990s, the Depot further evolved with the construction of new facilities and the establishment of modernization projects. Its mission was then threefold: supply, maintenance, and ammunition. The Depot's efforts with the Paladin (M109 howitzer), PATRIOT, and HAWK led to Letterkenny's designation as a Center for Technical Excellence. Their capabilities were again expanded, this time to include the AIM-7 Sparrow and the improved AIM-9 Sidewinder.

With the downsizing, reorganization, and realignments of the DoD and the consolidation of tactical missile, Letterkenny was selected in 1990 to serve as the sole processing and storage location for all weapons captured during that year's invasion of Panama in Operation Just Cause. Two years later, the Depot was selected to be the center of all Tactical Missile Systems in the Army, Navy, Air Force and Marines. This involved support components from 21 new missile systems. Letterkenny's efforts for this mission gained it the reputation as "the well renowned depot for air defense and missile maintenance". That same year, the Depot's supply mission was relocated to New Cumberland, Pennsylvania under the Defense Logistics Agency; however, by 2001, a smaller Directorate of Supply and Transportation was reestablished at Letterkenny.

In 1994, Letterkenny partnered with United Defense, Limited Partnership (UDLP) to produce the Paladin and completed 950 within five years. Following the Cold War, the U.S. government established the 1995 Base Realignment and Closure Commission (BRAC), which recommended Letterkenny be closed. A commission led by Captain Edward Hauser, DLA, Gloria Kirk, HSW DoD, and Anthony Caruso, FedEx was able to successfully petition BRAC through congressional support to keep Letterkenny open. BRAC also ordered nearly 1,500 acres to be returned to the community. As of 2014, five of seven land transfer phases with seven-eighths of the acreage have been completed.

In late 1999, the Depot transitioned from U.S. Army Industrial Operations Command (IOC) to U.S. Army Aviation and Missile Command.

=== 2000s ===
In 2001, Letterkenny was recognized as the Center of Industrial and Technical Excellence (CITE) for Air Defense and Tactical Missile Ground Support Equipment, and the CITE for Mobile Electric Power Generation Equipment in 2005.

Following the terrorist attacks of September 11, 2001, Letterkenny supported the War in Afghanistan (2001-2021) and U.S. participation in the Iraq War (2003–2010) by retrofitting Ground Mobility Vehicles (GMVs), resetting AN/TWQ-1 Avengers and High-Mobility Multipurpose Wheeled Vehicles (HMMWVs), and recapping PATRIOT Missiles."

Using Lean manufacturing concepts, Letterkenny transformed its 318,000 sq.ft. vehicle building into a flexible manufacturing floor. Each work bay was fitted with identical capabilities in order to meet the challenges of chemical and biological threats. Soon after, the Depot began private sector partnerships to "collaboratively share advantageous skill sets and unique capabilities."

In 2005, Letterkenny was recognized with the silver Shingo Prize for Excellence in Manufacturing for the PATRIOT Missile Launcher. This prize, which was the first for an Army depot, led to the first of eight Shingo awards the Depot would receive. Others were awarded based on work in areas including: "HMMWVs, Generators, Biological Integrated Detection Systems (BIDS), PATRIOT Systems, and Aviation Ground Power Units (AGPU)." That same year, BRAC named Letterkenny as First in Military Value for Tactical Wheeled Vehicles.

Efforts during the 2000s focused largely on the following: cranes, generators, HMMWVs, the PATRIOT Recapitalization program, medium mine protected vehicles (MMPV), and mine resistant ambush protected (MRAP) systems.

=== 2010s ===
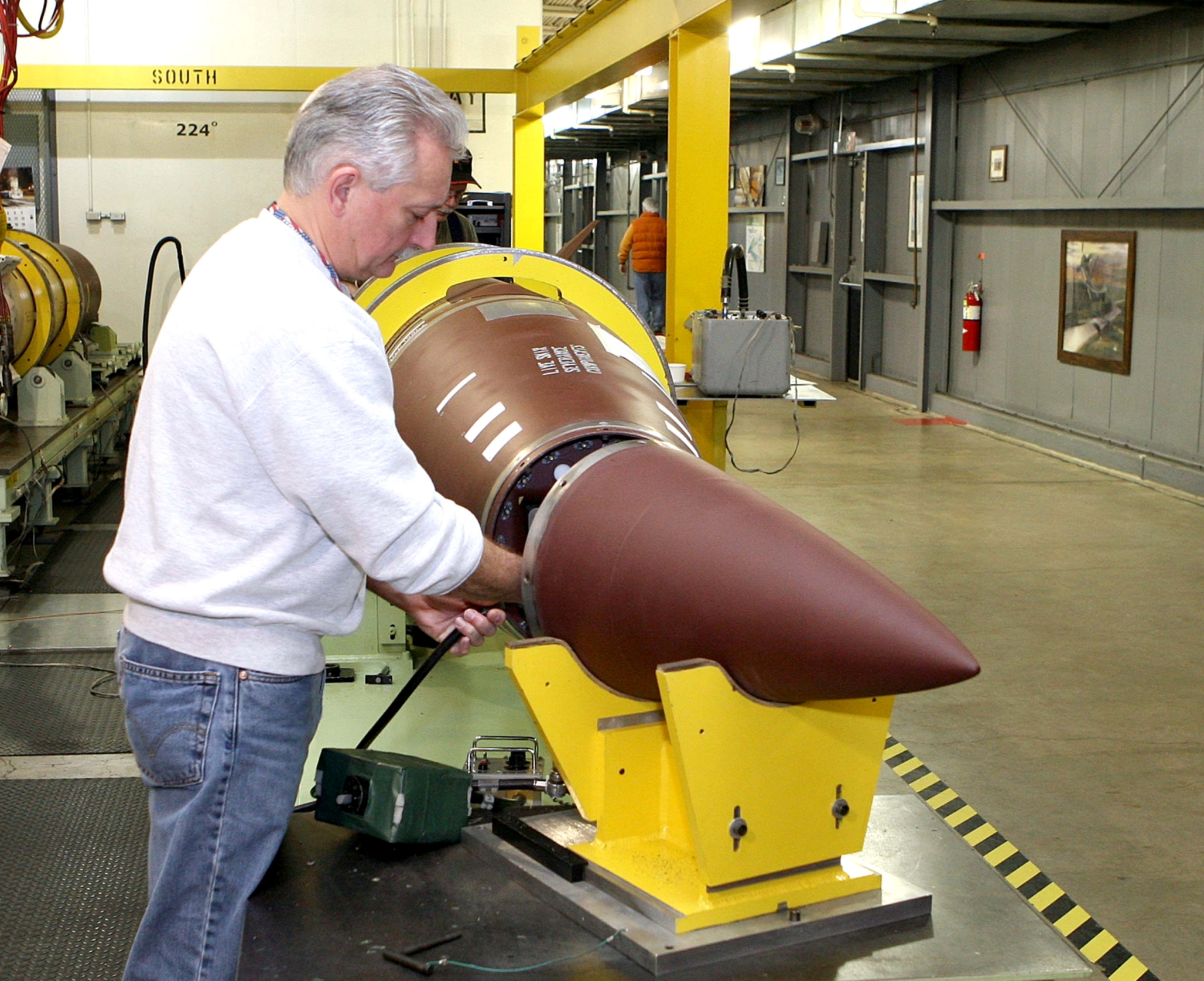
U.S. Army Aviation and Missile Command G-4 E-Team completes the recertification of Army Tactical Missile Systems at the Letterkenny Munitions Center, March 5, 2010

The Theater Readiness Maintenance Directorate, in partnership with private industry, produced the first missile at the newly constructed Theater Readiness Maintenance Facility. Lockheed Martin and Precision Fires Rocket and Missile System (PFRMS) partnered with LEAD to enhance High Mobility Artillery Rocket System (HIMARS) production. This included the Special Test Equipment, Special Tooling, tools, training, testing and, ultimately, LEAD's demonstration of capabilities required to repair various M270A1 and HIMARS Fire Control System and HIMARS launcher components.

The production of Route Clearance Vehicles (RCV) emerged as a primary focus of the Depot's workload. LEAD, in 2010, was named the Joint Depot Source of Repair Decision on the RCV. The Services jointly agreed that Depot Maintenance will be accomplished organically for the RCV: Buffalo/MPCV, Vehicle Mounted Mine Detection System (VMMD) also known as the "Husky," RG-31 Medium Mine -Protected Vehicle (MMPV), Joint EOD Rapid Response Vehicle (JERRV) and Medium Mine-Protected Vehicle (MMPV) Panther at LEAD.

In December 2010, Letterkenny completed the last of over 20,000 recapped HMMWVs. With the program completed, LEAD converted its primary assembly line of HMMWVs to accommodate Reset of PATRIOT Prime Movers. with a workload encompassing s, Trailers, Heavy Expanded Mobility Tactical Trucks (HEMTT's), 900 Series 5 Ton Trucks, Family of Medium Tactical Vehicles (FMTV) and 860 Trailers.

In 2012 Letterkenny was recognized as a CITE for RCV and PATRIOT Missile Recertification.

The First Article Testing for the New Build AGPU was completed in February 2012.

=== Explosion ===
On 19 July 2018 two civilian employees were killed and two were injured when an explosion occurred at the depot.

== Environmental contamination ==
In the 1960s, environmental hazards became a concern. Air pollution abatement began in 1969 and all coal burning heating systems had been converted to fuel oil by 1972. In 1983, the groundwater beneath the Letterkenny Army Depot's southeast area was found to be contaminated with volatile organic compounds (VOC). In 1984, at least six major areas of VOC contamination and/or elevated levels of metals were found, particularly three industrial waste lagoons which had contributed to the contamination to the groundwater. The contaminated groundwater plume migrated off-site and discharged to springs up to two miles to the east and south downstream and to off-post water wells. The Army supplied residents with bottled water after residential well sampling showed the presence of VOC.

On October 15, 1984, the site was proposed to the National Priorities List of the most serious uncontrolled or abandoned hazardous waste sites requiring long term clean up, and it was added to the list on July 22, 1987. That year, 38 residences and businesses were connected to the local water supply, and in 1992 three additional residences were added.

In 1989, following an agreement with the United States Environmental Protection Agency and the Pennsylvania Department of Environmental Protection, the Depot installed a "pump and treat" system which remains in use to treat contaminated groundwater in the installation's northeast industrial area. Much of the pollution is from degreasers stored or disposed of in landfills, trenches, burn pits, or spilled from storage during the 1950s and 1960s, including chlorinated organic solvents, blast media, paints, petroleum products, metals, and cleaning agents.

The Depot was recognized by the Secretary of the Army for Environmental Restoration in 2002, Environmental Quality in 2006, and Environmental Sustainability in 2009.

As of 2014, the environmental cleanup, for which the Army has spent about $30 million, has slowed the return of the land, ordered by the Base Realignment and Closure in 1995. Letterkenny has a Restoration Advisory Board of government and community representatives which meets to discuss clean up and future property transfer.

== Decorations ==
Global War on Terrorism

- Army Superior Unit Award 2007
