= Roxbury, Pennsylvania =

Unincorporated community in Pennsylvania, US

- Unincorporated community
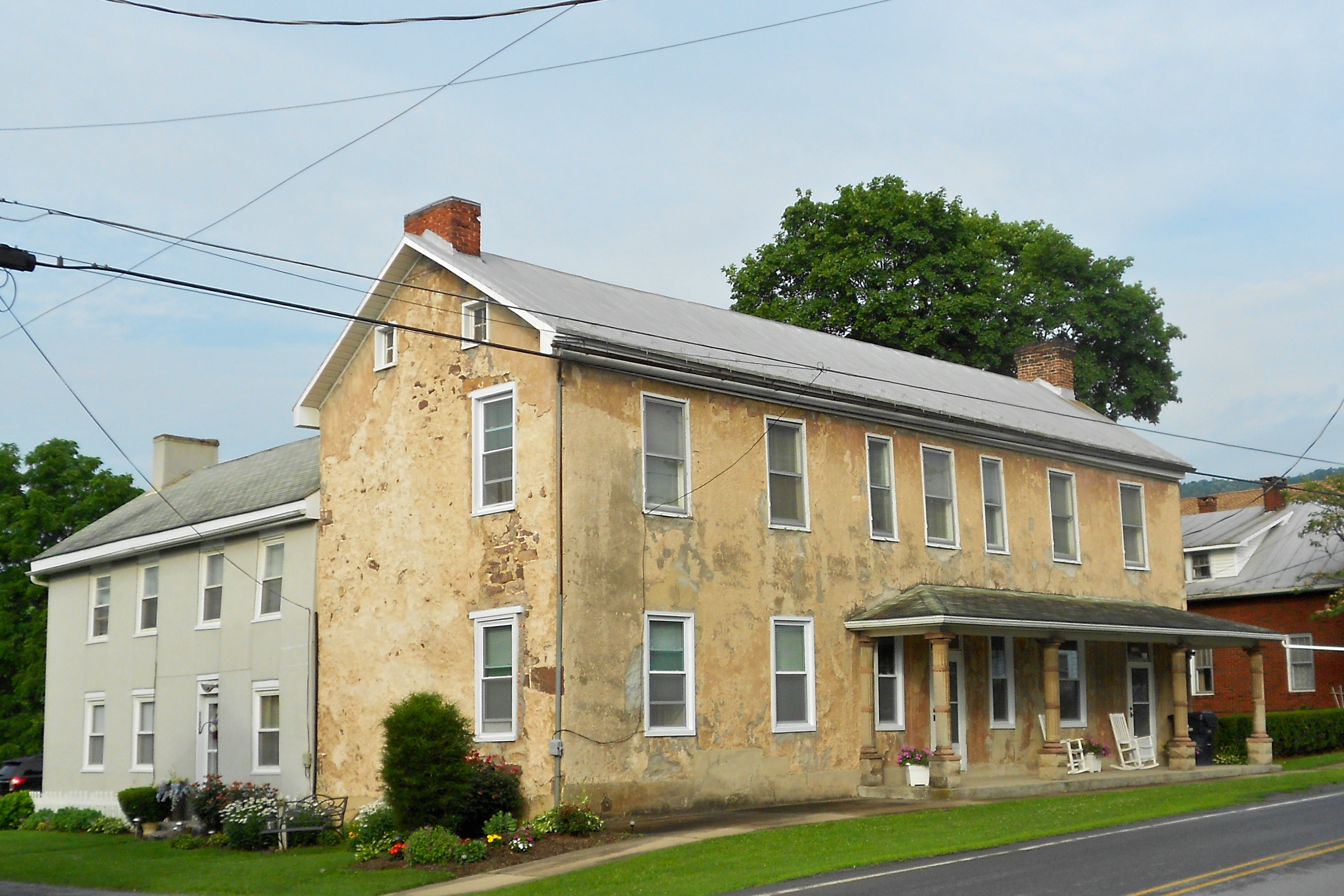
- House in Roxbury

- Location within Pennsylvania Location within the United States
- Coordinates: 40°6′37″N 77°39′43″W
- Country: United States
- State: Pennsylvania
- County: Franklin
- Township: Lurgan
- Elevation: 748 ft (228 m)
- Time zone: UTC-5 (Eastern (EST))
  - Summer (DST): UTC-4 (EDT)
- ZIP code: 17251
- Area code: 717
- GNIS feature ID: 1185584

Roxbury is an unincorporated community located off the Blue Mountain exit of the Pennsylvania Turnpike (Interstate 76) in Lurgan Township, Franklin County, Pennsylvania, United States. Route 641 and Route 997 meet there.

Roxbury was laid out circa 1778. A post office called Roxbury has been in operation since 1822.

== Notable person ==
• Carl Cover, (1893–1944) aviation pioneer
