= William E. Miller (soldier, born 1836) =

American soldier (1836–1919)

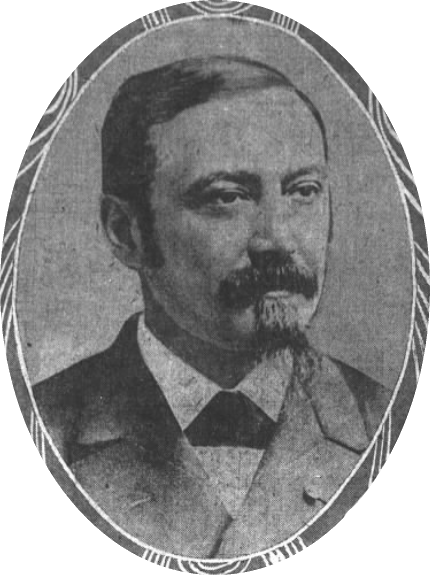

Member of the Pennsylvania Senate from the 32nd district
- In office 1899–1902
- Preceded by: Alfred W. Milleisen
- Succeeded by: Donald P. McPherson Sr

Personal details
- Born: February 5, 1836 West Hill, Cumberland County, Pennsylvania, US
- Died: December 10, 1919 (aged 83) Carlisle, Cumberland County, Pennsylvania, US
- Resting place: Gettysburg National Cemetery
- Party: Democratic
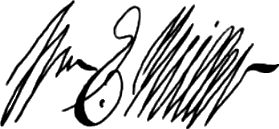
- Signature

Military service
- Allegiance: United States of America
- Branch/service: United States Army
- Years of service: 1861 - 1864
- Rank: Captain
- Unit: Company H, 3rd Pennsylvania Cavalry
- Battles/wars: Battle of Gettysburg; American Civil War
- Awards: Medal of Honor

William Edward Miller (February 5, 1836 – December 10, 1919) was an American soldier and Pennsylvania State Senator who fought with the Union Army in the American Civil War. Miller received his country's highest award for bravery during combat, the Medal of Honor, for actions taken on July 3, 1863, during the Battle of Gettysburg. While ordered to keep his company stationed on a hill, he disobeyed these orders to lead a surprise attack against a Confederate charge. Said to have saved Gettysburg for his decision to break rank, this was claimed to be the first time in American military history where a soldier was awarded for disobeying a direct order.

== Early life ==
William Edward Miller was born to Andrew G. Miller and Eleanor Umberger Miller in West Hill, Pennsylvania, one mile west of Plainfield, on February 5, 1836. As the oldest son, William helped his father run the family farm and care for his five younger siblings. He received a limited education in the local school system and at 16 joined a local cavalry militia, the "Big Spring Adamantite Guard".

== Civil War service ==
At the onset of the American Civil War, Miller's cavalry unit was one of the first militia to offer their services to Pennsylvania Governor Andrew Gregg Curtin. Miller was mustered into the Union Army as a second lieutenant on August 8, 1861, for a three-year enlistment, and the unit was given the designation Company H of the 3rd Pennsylvania Cavalry. Because Miller had served with the militia for nine years preceding the war, he was one of the few guards who kept his former rank. After cavalry training at Camp Marcey near Washington, D.C., Miller was one of the few officers who retained his commission.

Miller first saw service in 1862 during the Peninsula campaign. After fighting in skirmishes around Yorktown, Virginia, the 3rd Pennsylvania was relocated to Williamsburg. Once in Williamsburg, Miller was ordered by Brigadier General Samuel P. Heintzelman to deliver a message to Major General George B. McClellan back at Yorktown. After successfully completing his orders he received commendations from both generals. During this campaign, Miller met with Prince Philippe, the Count of Paris, who was serving as assistant adjutant general to McClellan with the rank of captain. The two maintained a friendship following the war.

In September 1862, the 3rd Pennsylvania was sent to Maryland to defend against the invasion force of Robert E. Lee. On September 16, the regiment helped lead Brigadier General Joseph Hooker's corps across Antietam Creek and Company H was assigned to Hooker's headquarters. The following afternoon, as Confederate Lieutenant General Stonewall Jackson was pushing towards the Union line, one of his brigades rushed forward on a Union gun battery. Miller came to the aid of the battery and helped rescue guns before they fell to the enemy, and for his gallantry was promoted to captain for his efforts and bravery. With his promotion to captain, Miller became the commander of Company H.

=== Gettysburg ===
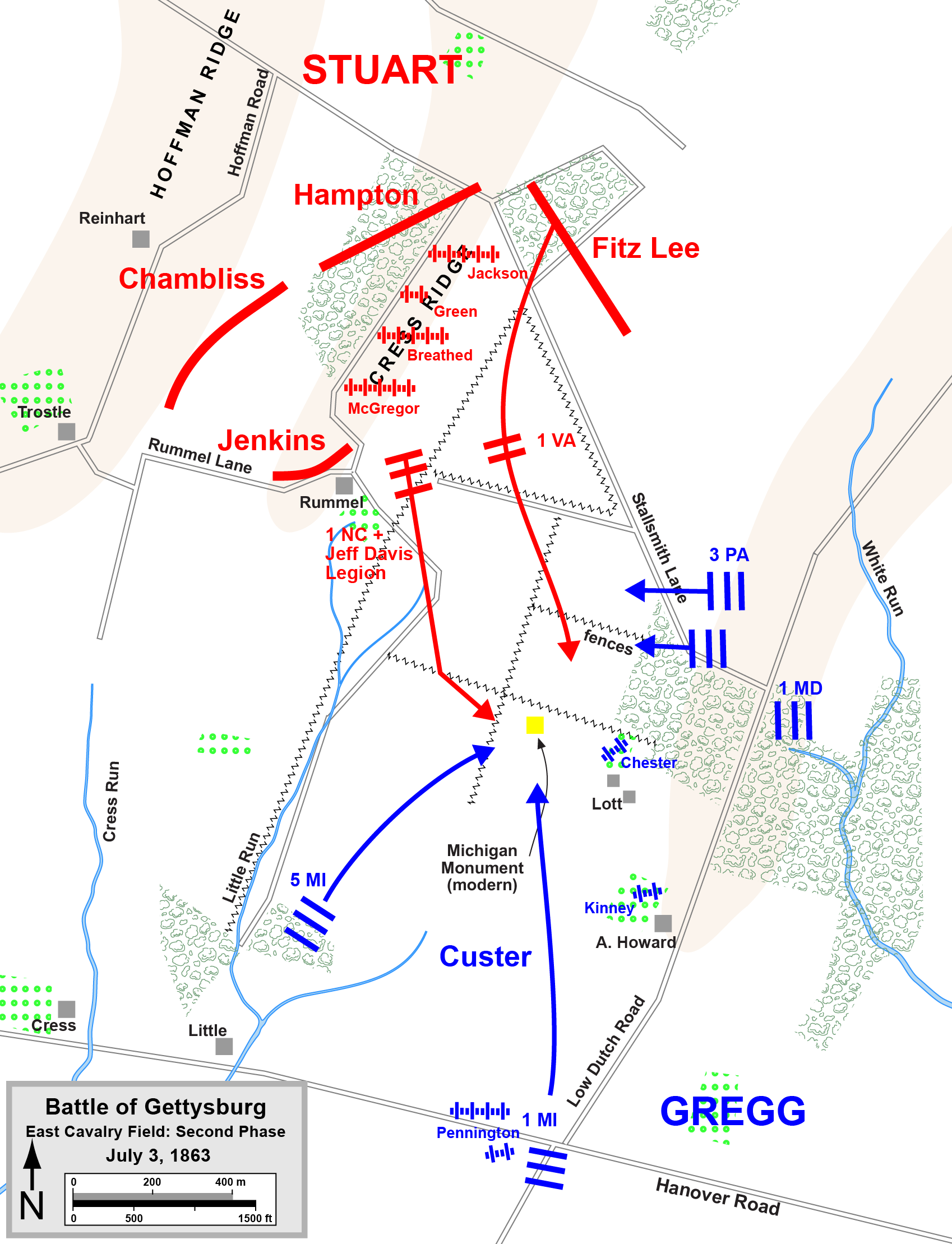
East Cavalry Field at the end of the battle on July 3. Miller's regiment, 3 PA, can be seen advancing on Fitz Lee's left flank.

On July 2, 1863, the 3rd Pennsylvania Cavalry arrived at Brinkerhoff's Ridge to the east of Gettysburg, Pennsylvania. Miller's company, totaling roughly 100 troops, assumed a position on the right flank of the Union line near Cress Run which they held for the rest of the day. In the evening, Miller's Company H pushed forward with Company M to slow the advance of the 2nd Virginia Cavalry along the ridge. This prevented the Confederate army from fully fortifying the later attack on Culp's Hill as it would have left their flank uncovered.

On July 3, Miller was given orders to hold his company "at all hazards" in the woods north of the Lott house and assist the 1st New Jersey Cavalry Regiment in repelling Brigadier General Wade Hampton's advance. When the enemy brigade advanced, Miller noticed a large contingent led by Confederate Brigadier General Fitzhugh Lee threatening to break through a main section of the Union line. From his flank position he decided to disobey his orders and attack the Confederate from the side and stated to his adjutants, "I have been ordered to hold this position, but, if you will back me up in case I am court-martialed for disobedience, I will order a charge." With full company agreement, Miller led his men into the flank of the Confederate advance causing confusion among the rebels who believed their retreat path was about to be cut off. Because of Miller's surprise attack, the Confederate rear line was dispersed, and the Union line saved. During the melee, Miller was shot through the right arm. After the fighting, Colonel John Baillie McIntosh, who had attacked the Confederate charge from the opposite flank, congratulated Miller on his attack.

=== Late Civil War service ===
Miller fought with the Union army for another year before being mustered out of service on August 24, 1864. Despite disobeying a direct order he was never court-martialed for his decision to break rank. Indeed, his decision to charge the Confederate advance earned him the Medal of Honor, which was awarded in July 1897. It was stated at the time that Miller's action was the first and only instance in which a US soldier was awarded for disobeying a direct order. Later reports credited Miller's decision as one of the turning points of the Battle of Gettysburg, with one reporter even calling him the man who "won Gettysburg".

In a 1906 work by Arthur L. Wagner on military tactics, Wagner contrasted Miller's surprise attack with Lord Cardigan's Charge of the Light Brigade in the Battle of Balaclava. Whereas Cardigan's inaction to attack an exposed flank of the Russian cavalry caused his own brigade to lose the battle, Miller's disobedience served as the catalyst to end the Confederate approach and save the day.

After he was mustered out of service, Miller was elected a companion of the Pennsylvania Commandery of the Military Order of the Loyal Legion of the United States.

== Medal of Honor citation ==
The President of the United States of America, in the name of Congress, takes pleasure in presenting the Medal of Honor to Captain William Edward Miller, United States Army, for extraordinary heroism on 3 July 1863, while serving with Company H, 3d Pennsylvania Cavalry, in action at Gettysburg, Pennsylvania. Without orders, Captain Miller led a charge of his squadron upon the flank of the enemy, checked his attack, and cut off and dispersed the rear of his column.

== Personal life ==
On October 23, 1856, Miller married Elizabeth "Betsy" Ann Hocker. Together they had two children, Caroline and Elizabeth (Lizzie). Betsy died of typhoid in 1859 at the age of 24 before the Civil War began. His daughter Lizzie died in 1862 during the war.

In 1868, following the Civil War, Miller married for a second time, to Anna Depui Bush. Together they moved to Carlisle, Pennsylvania, where Miller began a hardware business on North Hanover Street, which he continued in until 1898. Miller was active in local politics, and served as the Chair of the Democratic committee in 1877 and 1888, and Burgess of Carlisle in 1882 and 1883. In 1894 his wife Anna died and Miller never remarried. That same year, he served as the president of the Carlisle Board of Health, a position he held for four years. In 1898 he was elected to the Pennsylvania State Senate as a Democrat, serving from 1899 to 1902. Following his stint in the State Senate, Miller sold fire insurance.

Miller was also an active force in creating the Hamilton Library Association, which was the forerunner to the Cumberland County Historical Society. To this organization he donated many artifacts from the Civil War, and served as secretary of its library until 1918.

Miller died at his home in Carlisle on December 10, 1919, and is buried at Gettysburg National Cemetery.

Pennsylvania State Senate
Preceded by Alfred W. Milleisen	Member of the Pennsylvania Senate for the 32nd District; 1889–1902	Succeeded by Donald P. McPherson Sr
