= Elmer Yoter =

American baseball player (1900–1966)

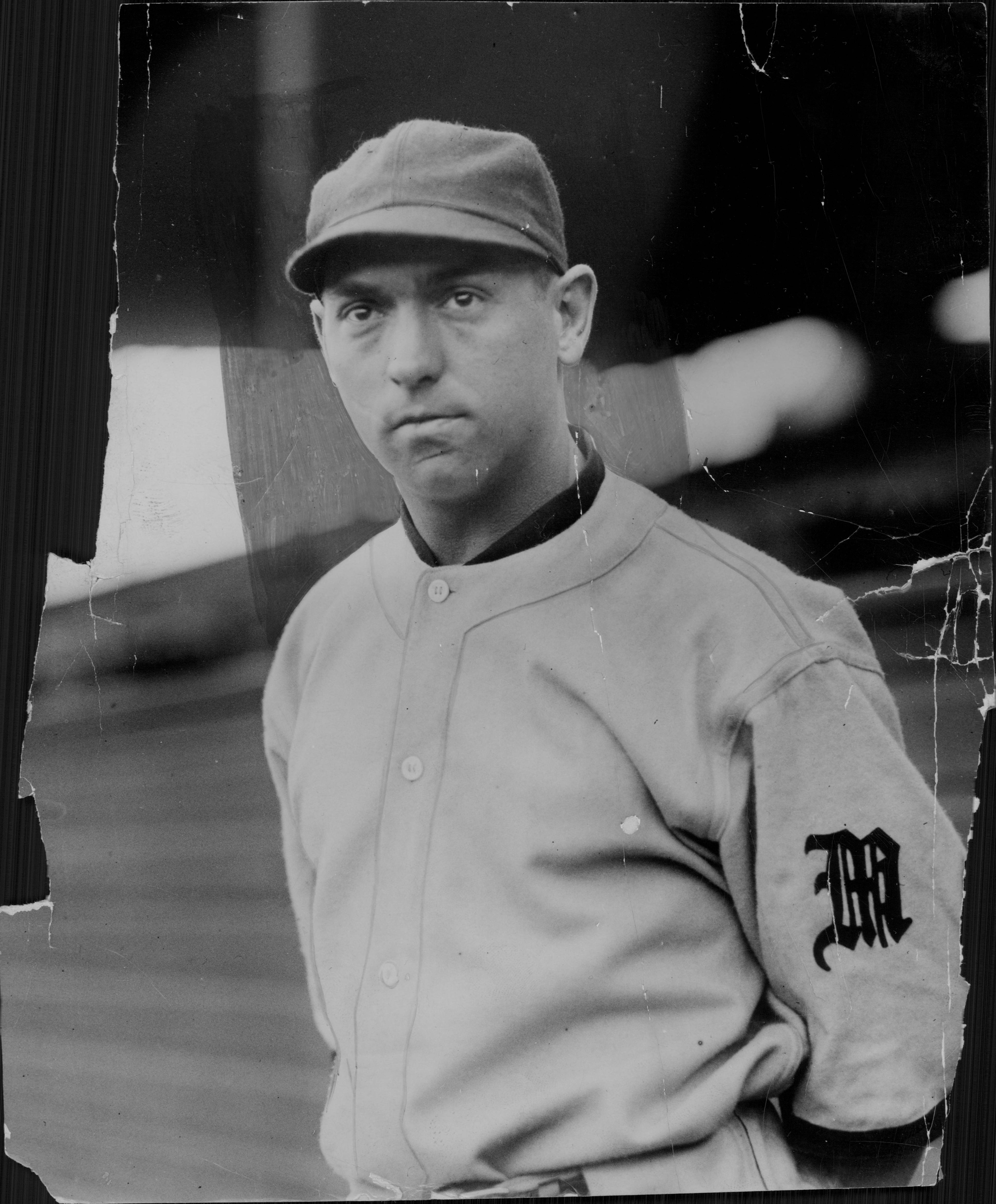
- Third baseman
- Born: June 26, 1900; Plainfield, Pennsylvania, U.S.
- Died: July 26, 1966 (aged 66); Camp Hill, Pennsylvania, U.S.
- Batted: Right Threw: Right

MLB debut
- September 9, 1921, for the Philadelphia Athletics

Last MLB appearance
- April 18, 1928, for the Chicago Cubs

MLB statistics
- Batting average: .250
- Home runs: 0
- RBI: 12
- Stats at Baseball Reference

Teams
- Philadelphia Athletics (1921); Cleveland Indians (1924); Chicago Cubs (1927–1928)

Elmer Ellsworth Yoter (June 26, 1900 – July 26, 1966) was an American professional baseball third baseman.

Yoter was born in Plainfield, Pennsylvania on June 26, 1900. He played parts of four seasons in Major League Baseball between 1921 and 1928 for the Philadelphia Athletics, Cleveland Indians and Chicago Cubs. In 36 MLB games, he collected 24 hits with two doubles and two triples, hitting .250 with 12 runs batted in. He threw and batted right-handed, stood 5 feet 7 inches (1.70 m) tall and weighed 155 pounds (70 kg). Yoter spent twenty-one seasons as a minor league manager, much of that time in the farm system of the Boston Red Sox, compiling a record of 1,331-1,220 (.522). He also was a longtime scout for the Bosox.

Yoter died in Camp Hill, Pennsylvania on July 26, 1966, at the age of sixty-six.
