= Randy Shughart =

United States Army Medal of Honor recipient (1958–1993)

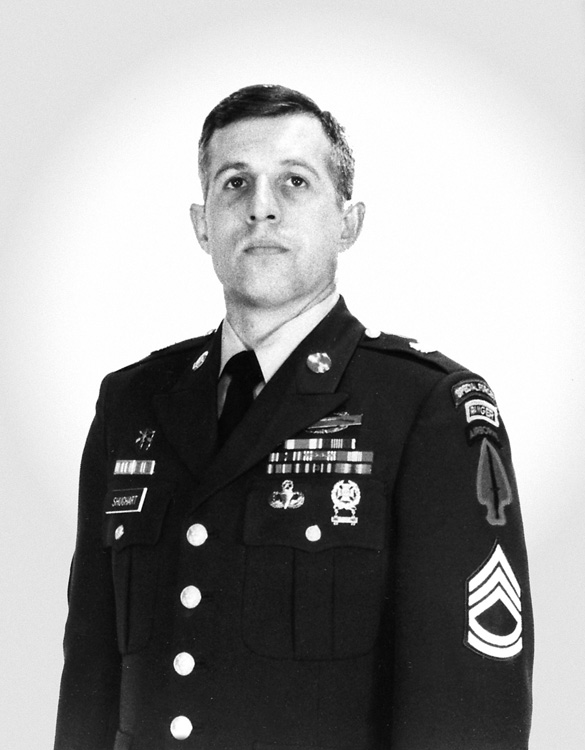
- Born: August 13, 1958; Lincoln, Nebraska, United States
- Died: October 3, 1993 (aged 35); Mogadishu, Somalia
- Burial place: Westminster Cemetery, Carlisle, Pennsylvania
- Military career
- Allegiance: United States
- Branch: United States Army
- Service years: 1976–1993
- Rank: Sergeant First Class
- Units: 2nd Ranger Battalion; Delta Force
- Conflicts: Operation Just Cause; Operation Gothic Serpent; Battle of Mogadishu †
- Awards: Medal of Honor; Purple Heart

Randall David Shughart (August 13, 1958 – October 3, 1993) was a United States Army Delta Force operator who was posthumously awarded the Medal of Honor for his actions during the Battle of Mogadishu, during Operation Gothic Serpent in October 1993.

== Early life ==
Shughart was born August 13, 1958, in Lincoln, Nebraska. After his father, Herbert Shughart, left the Air Force, the Shugharts moved to Newville, Pennsylvania, to live and work on a dairy farm.

== Military career ==
Shughart joined the United States Army while attending Big Spring High School in Newville, entering upon graduation in 1976. After completing basic training, he successfully completed infantry AIT (advanced individual training), Airborne School, and in 1978 was assigned to the 2nd Ranger Battalion, 75th Ranger Regiment, at Fort Lewis, Washington. Several months later, he completed a pre-ranger course (formerly known as SURT, Small Unit Ranger Tactics), was granted a slot to attend Ranger School, graduated, and earned the Ranger Tab. Shughart left active duty and went into the Army Reserve in June 1980. In December 1983, Shughart returned to active duty and the following year attended special forces training. Shughart was assigned to Delta Force and was transferred to Fort Bragg, North Carolina in June 1986. As a Delta Force operator, he advanced to Assistant Team Sergeant.

Shughart was deployed to Mogadishu, Somalia in 1993 as part of Task Force Ranger. On October 3, 1993, during an assault mission to apprehend advisors to the Somali warlord Mohamed Farrah Aidid, a Black Hawk helicopter with the call sign Super Six-One was shot down in the city. A combat search and rescue (CSAR) team was sent in to secure the survivors. Then, a second Black Hawk helicopter, call sign Super Six-Four, was shot down.

Shughart, Master Sergeant Gary Gordon, and Sergeant First Class Brad Halling had been providing sniper cover from the air from Black Hawk Super Six-Two. Gordon wanted to be inserted to secure the crash site as hostile Somalis were converging on the area.

Mission commanders denied Gordon's request twice, saying that the situation was too dangerous for the snipers to protect the crew from the ground. Command's position was that the snipers could be of more assistance by providing air cover. Gordon, however, repeated his request until he got permission. Halling stayed behind to man a door gun as one of the helicopter's gunners had been wounded.

Armed with their sniper rifles and sidearms, Shughart and Gordon were inserted approximately 100 metres (330 ft) from the crash site and made their way to the downed Black Hawk. Chief Warrant Officer Mike Durant was already defending the aircraft with an MP5, but was unable to move from his seat due to injuries sustained in the crash. When they reached Super Six-Four, they extracted Durant and the other crew from the helicopter and defended the aircraft. It is believed that Gordon was the first of the two to be killed by the surrounding mob. Shughart retrieved Gordon's CAR-15 rifle and gave it to Durant to use. Shortly after, Shughart was killed, the site was overrun and Durant was taken hostage. According to Durant's book In the Company of Heroes, the Somalis counted 25 of their militia dead after the firefight.

There was some confusion in the aftermath of the action as to who had been killed first. The official citation states that Shughart had been killed first but Mark Bowden, author of Black Hawk Down: A Story of Modern War, relates an account by Sergeant Paul Howe who heard Shughart call for help on the radio and noted that the weapon handed to Durant was not the distinctive M14 rifle that Shughart used. Howe said that Gordon would not have given his weapon to someone while he could still fight. Durant acknowledged that he might have been wrong in his identification but was reluctant to push for the record to be changed since he was not sure. Shughart's body was eventually recovered and is buried in Westminster Cemetery, Carlisle, Pennsylvania.

== In popular culture ==
In the 2001 film Black Hawk Down, Shughart was portrayed by actor Johnny Strong.

== Awards and decorations ==
SFC Shughart's awards and decorations include:

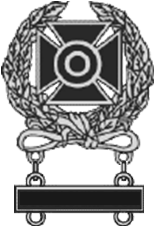

Combat Infantryman Badge with star (denoting second award)
Medal of Honor		Purple Heart
Meritorious Service Medal	Army Commendation Medal	Army Achievement Medal with oak leaf cluster
Army Good Conduct Medal, 5 awards	National Defense Service Medal	Armed Forces Expeditionary Medal
Non-Commissioned Officer Professional Development Ribbon with Award numeral 3	Army Service Ribbon	United Nations Medal
Master Parachutist Badge	Military Freefall Parachutist Badge	Expert Marksmanship badge with rifle component bar
Special Forces Tab		Ranger Tab
Joint Meritorious Unit Award		Valorous Unit Award

=== Medal of Honor ===
On May 23, 1994, Shughart and Gordon were posthumously decorated with the Medal of Honor for protecting the crew of Super Six Four. They were the first Medal of Honor recipients since the Vietnam War.

Herbert Shughart, Randall Shughart's father, attended the Medal of Honor presentation ceremony at the White House, where he refused to shake hands with U.S. President Bill Clinton. He then proceeded to openly criticize the president, telling him, "You are not fit to be president of the United States. The blame for my son's death rests with the White House and with you. You are not fit to command."

=== Medal of Honor citation ===

Sergeant First Class Shughart, United States Army, distinguished himself by actions above and beyond the call of duty on 3 October 1993, while serving as a Sniper Team Member, United States Army Special Operations Command with Task Force Ranger in Mogadishu, Somalia. Sergeant First Class Shughart provided precision sniper fires from the lead helicopter during an assault on a building and at two helicopter crash sites, while subjected to intense automatic weapon fire and numerous rocket propelled grenades. While providing critical suppressive fire at the second crash site, Sergeant First Class Shughart and his team leader learned that ground forces were not immediately available to secure the site. Sergeant First Class Shughart and his team leader unhesitatingly volunteered to be inserted to protect the four critically wounded personnel, despite being well aware of the growing number of enemy personnel closing in on the site. After their third request to be inserted, Sergeant First Class Shughart and his team leader received permission to perform this volunteer mission. When debris and enemy ground fires at the site caused them to abort the first attempt, Sergeant First Class Shughart and his team leader were inserted one hundred meters south of the crash site. Equipped with only his sniper rifle and a pistol, Sergeant First Class Shughart and his team leader, while under intense fire from the enemy, fought their way through a dense maze of shanties and shacks to reach the critically injured crew members. Sergeant First Class Shughart pulled the pilot and the other crew members from the aircraft, establishing a perimeter which placed him and his fellow sniper in the most vulnerable position. Sergeant First Class Shughart used his long range rifle and side arm to kill an undetermined number of attackers while traveling the perimeter, protecting the downed crew. Sergeant First Class Shughart continued his protective fire until he depleted his ammunition and was fatally wounded. His actions saved the pilot's life. Sergeant First Class Shughart's extraordinary heroism and devotion to duty were in keeping with the highest standards of military service and reflect great credit upon him-self, his unit and the United States Army.

== Commemorations ==
=== USNS Shughart ===
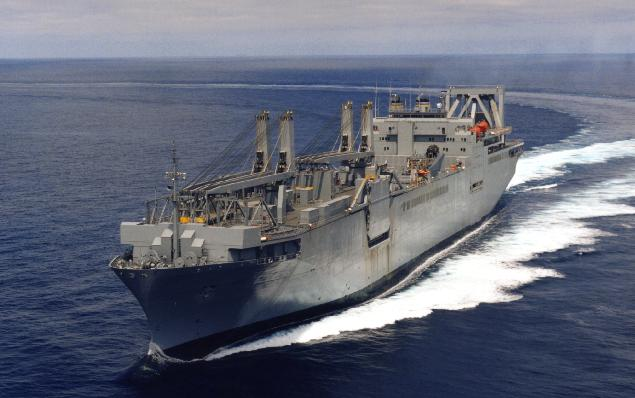
Roll-on/roll-off ship Shughart

In 1997, the Navy named roll-on/roll-off ship USNS Shughart (T-AKR-295) in a ceremony at the National Steel and Shipbuilding Company, San Diego. The ceremony was attended by a number of officers and politicians including Shughart's commanding officer at the time of his death; John W. Douglass, Assistant Secretary of the Navy for Research, Development and Acquisition; Senator Bob Kerrey; and others. The ship was the first "Large Medium Speed Roll On/Roll Off (LMSR) ship" to undergo conversion from a commercial container vessel to a sealift cargo ship.

=== Memorial Bridge ===
The Pennsylvania Route 641 bridge over the Big Spring Creek (Pennsylvania) was dedicated May 30, 2024 as the SFC Randall Shughart Memorial Bridge.

=== Army Shughart-Gordon Urban Operations Training Center ===
Shughart-Gordon Urban Operations Training Center (Military Operations in Urban Terrain (MOUT) Site"), US Army Joint Readiness Training Center, Fort Polk, Louisiana, was named for Shughart and Gary Gordon.

=== Shughart Middle School - Cameron, NC ===
    - Shughart Middle School Blackhawks * * *

https://shughartms.dodea.edu/school-about-us

== See also ==
- List of post-Vietnam Medal of Honor recipients
