= North Newton =

North Newton is the name of the following places:

- North Newton, Kansas, United States of America
- North Newton Township, Pennsylvania, United States of America
- North Newton, Somerset, United Kingdom
