= McCullough House =

McCullough House may refer to:

== United States ==
(by state)

- McCullough House, a women's dorm at Hoosac School, Hoosick Falls, New York
- John McCullough House, listed on the NRHP in Cumberland County, Pennsylvania
- Charles S. McCullough House, Darlington, South Carolina, listed on the NRHP in Darlington County, South Carolina
- John Hunter House (Franklin, Tennessee), also known as McCullough House, NRHP-listed
- Park-McCullough Historic House, North Bennington, Vermont, NRHP-listed

== See also ==
- Alan McCullough (architect), who designed houses in Virginia
