= The Republican Compiler =

Former newspaper published in Gettysburg

- Truth is mighty, and will prevail
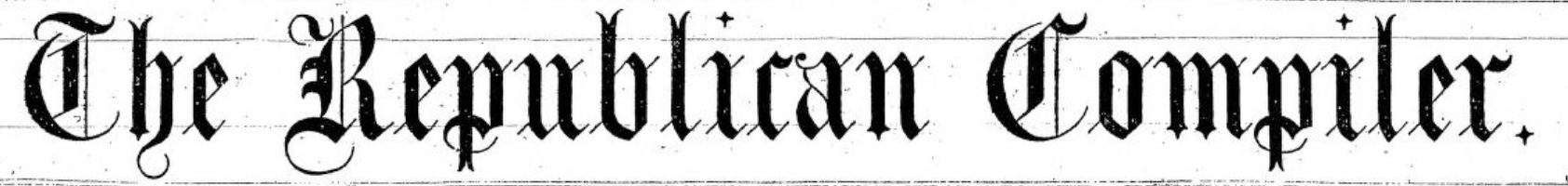

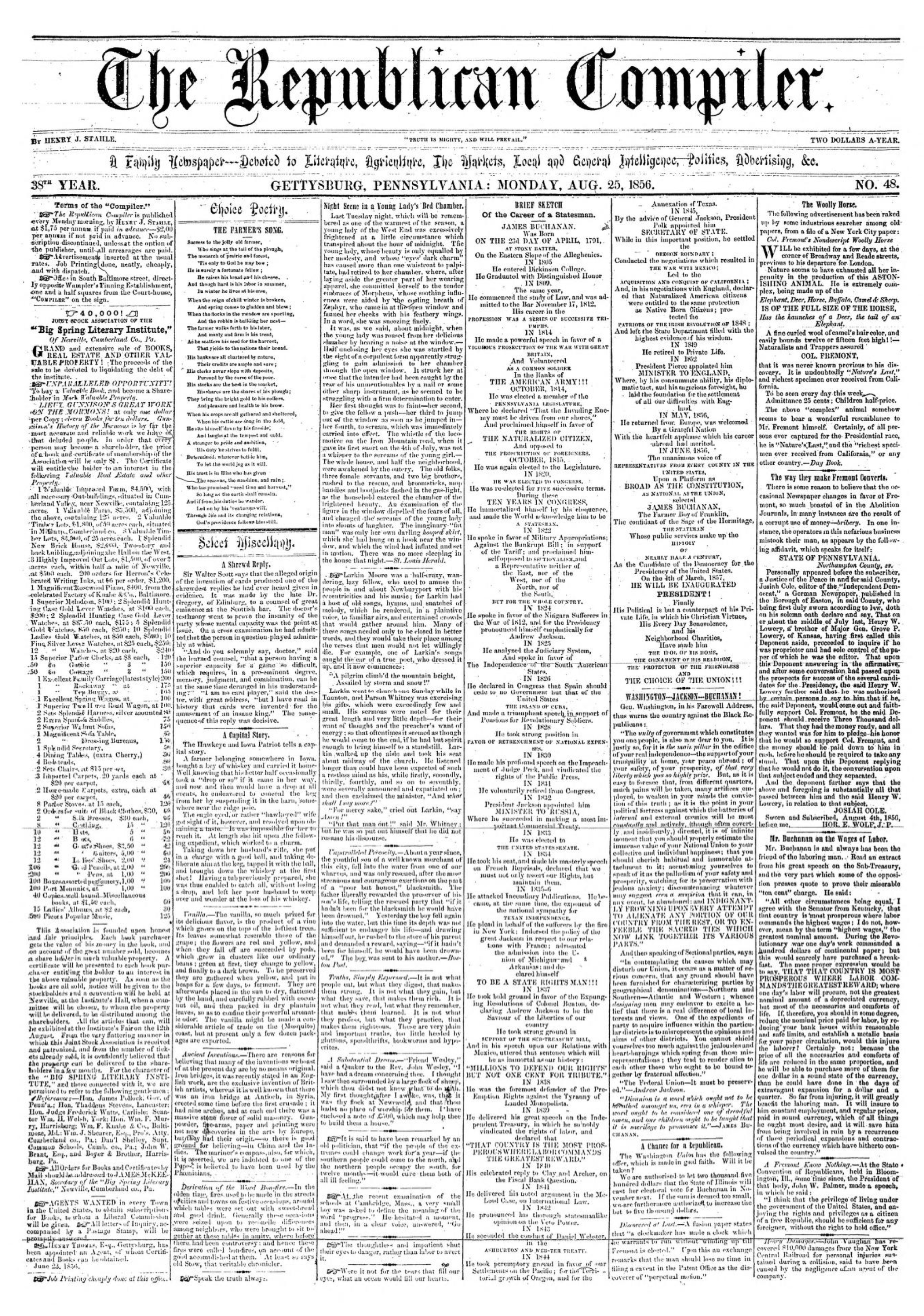
- The Republican Compiler's front page on August 25, 1856 including an endorsement for James Buchanan
- Type: Weekly newspaper
- Owner(s): Jacob Lefever; E.W. Stahle; Henry J. Stahle
- Founder: Jacob Lefever
- Founded: 1818
- Ceased publication: 1857; 169 years ago
- Political alignment: Democratic-Republican; Democratic
- Language: English
- City: Gettysburg, Pennsylvania
- Country: United States
- Sister newspapers: The Compiler; The Gettysburg Compiler
- OCLC number: 11172036

The Republican Compiler was a newspaper printed in Gettysburg, Pennsylvania servicing Adams County. The newspaper predated the Republican Party, and its name instead refers to early American Republicanism.

== History ==
=== Lefever family ===
The newspaper was founded by Jacob Lefever in 1819, the second oldest newspaper in Gettysburg, behind just The Adams Sentinel. Lefever operated as the paper's chief executive and publisher until 1839 when he gave the newspaper to his son, Isaac Lefever, to pursue a political career, ultimately serving a single term in the Pennsylvania House of Representatives in 1848.

==== Stevens libel case ====
In 1831, then Gettysburg lawyer and borough councilman Thaddeus Stevens, gave a speech in Hagerstown, Maryland, where he strongly condemned freemasonry claiming that the organization was seeking to undermine the United States and enslave the American people. The newspaper, staunchly Democratic, attacked the personal appearance and character of Stevens, in an attempt to undermine the popularity of the local Anti-Masonic Party. Calling Stevens "bald" "stout" "lame" and a "harlot", and that his speech was "the vilest slanders barefaced falsehood and pandemoniac malignity against a large and respectable portion of our citizens that ever fell from the lips of any man." The newspaper also attacked Stevens place of birth for not being Pennsylvania when seeking to impact Pennsylvanian politics. In response, Stevens sued Lefever and the paper for libel, to which Lefever argued no defense and had to pay a $50 fine ($1,768.90 in 2023), retract the article, and was sentenced to three months in prison. The severity of the punishment that presiding Judge John Reed gave Lefever troubled Democratic governor George Wolf and his State Attorney Samuel Douglas, who sent his Adams County deputy, Andrew G. Miller to request Reed remit the prison sentence, Reed refused. After the trial, former state senator Zephaniah Herbert accused Reed, and the other presiding Judge, McClean, of prejudice as both were very active in local anti-masonic circles. A petition was also signed by most of Gettysburg's founding families requested they remit Lefever's prison sentence. Seventeen days after his sentencing, Governor Wolf pardoned Lefever. Later in Stevens' career, it was revealed that he bribed the editors of the Adams Sentinel and the Antimasonic Star to publish inflammatory rhetoric against The Republican Compiler which compelled Lefever to print the piece against Stevens.

=== Stahle family ===
Isaac, who was never a journalist or politician, sold the paper in 1843 to Edward Stahle to finance his tuition at the University of Pennsylvania's Medical School. Edward gave the newspaper to his son Henry Stahle shortly after in 1845. The newspaper maintained and even increased their ties to the Democratic Party, publishing their statements and declarations, as such, with the founding of the Republican Party in 1854 Henry would cease publication of The Republican Compiler in 1857, when he rebranded the newspaper as The Compiler.
