= Andrew G. Miller (Pennsylvania politician) =

American politician (1811–1880)

Member of the Pennsylvania Senate from the 18th district
- In office 1869–1871
- Preceded by: James C. Brown
- Succeeded by: Samuel C. Shimer

Personal details
- Born: June 7, 1811 Lower Allen Township
- Died: February 14, 1880 (aged 68) Shippensburg
- Party: Democratic
- Spouse: Eleanor Umberger Miller
- Children: William Edward Miller; Sarah Eleanor Snyder; Henrietta Bridges

Andrew G. Miller (June 7, 1811 – February 14, 1880) was an American politician from Pennsylvania who represented the 18th district of the Pennsylvania State Senate as a Democrat from 1869 to 1871.

== Biography ==
Andrew G. Miller was born on a farm along the Yellow Breeches Creek in Lower Allen Township, Cumberland County to Abraham and Elizabeth Miller. He worked at a Fulling mill along the Conodoguinet Creek in West Pennsboro Township and lived in West Hill operating a general store and hotel. He married Eleanor Umberger Miller in 1835 and had three children. His eldest child, William Edward Miller, served as a state senator and received the medal of honor during the American Civil War.

Miller's political career started in 1830 when he was elected a delegate to the Democratic-Republican Party convention in Gettysburg. There, he signed a declaration where the Democratic-Republican party of Adams County condemned the Anti-Masonic Party and stated that Freemasonry should be allowed to succeed or fail under its own merits.

In 1832 Miller was one of the principal organizers of the infant Democratic Party, helping to found the party's branch in Adams County. He espoused the belief that Andrew Jackson and the Democrats would return to the Agrarian roots of the Democratic-Republican Party and touted Jackson's first term as preserving the Union and guaranteeing American economic well-being.

Miller was elected a delegate to the Democratic Party in 1835, representing Adams County. That year he served as the secretary to a Democratic Convention in Gettysburg. The convention denounced the Second Bank of the United States for threatening the fundamental rights of men and creating a so-called "Bank Aristocracy" that was usurping political power, engaging in corrupt exchanges, and funneling money into political campaigns. The party also denounced Freemasons as supporters of the Bank.

As a delegate to the 1835 Democratic Gubernatorial convention, he was a prominent "Mule," or supporter of Henry A. P. Muhlenberg, signing a letter denouncing the "Wolves" who supported incumbent Governor George Wolf. The Democratic Convention in Harrisburg deadlocked, with 52 Mules and 41 Wolves, and was adjourned, with another convention to be held in Lewisburg. However, the Wolves, and a single Mule that switched sides, held a rump convention in the Pennsylvania Supreme Court where they nominated Wolf 42-0. The Mules would go on to host their own rump convention in Lewisburg, nominating Muhlenberg 51-0. The split in the Democratic party allowed Joseph Ritner of the Anti-Masonic Party to win with 46.9% of the vote.

Miller moved to Newville and worked as a blacksmith, but he suffered an injury that resulted in the amputation of his arm. Afterwards, he founded the Farmers and Mechanics Bank of Shippensburg, where he worked from 1856 to 1876. Concurrently, he was elected for a single term to the Pennsylvania State Senate as a Democrat for the newly redistricted 18th district from 1869 to 1871. During his tenure he secured passage of funds to found the Shippensburg State Normal School. He was defeated in the Democratic primaries.
