= West Pennsboro Township, Pennsylvania =

Township in Pennsylvania, US

Coordinates: 40°12′00″N 77°14′58″W

- Township
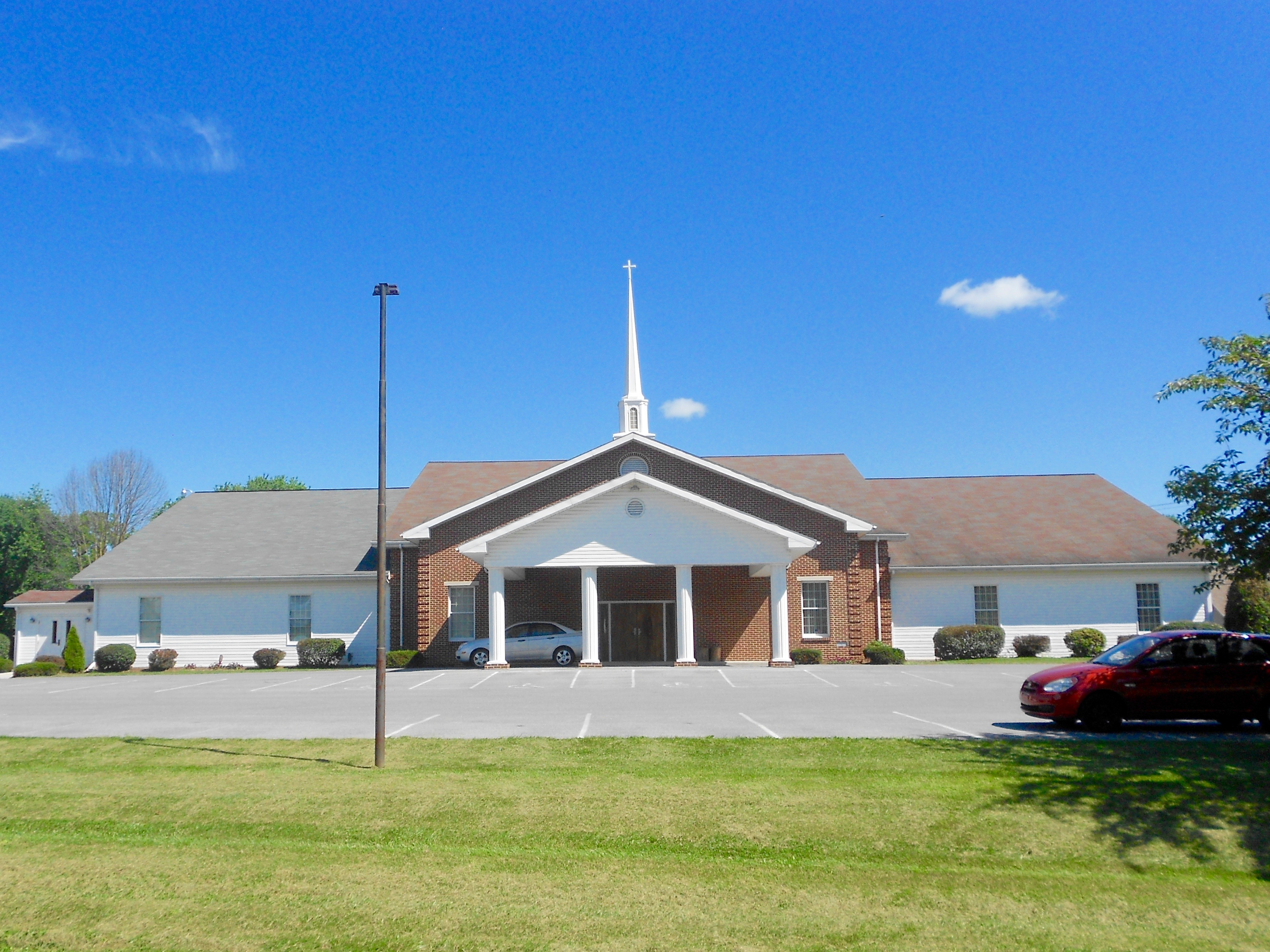
- Newville Assembly of God

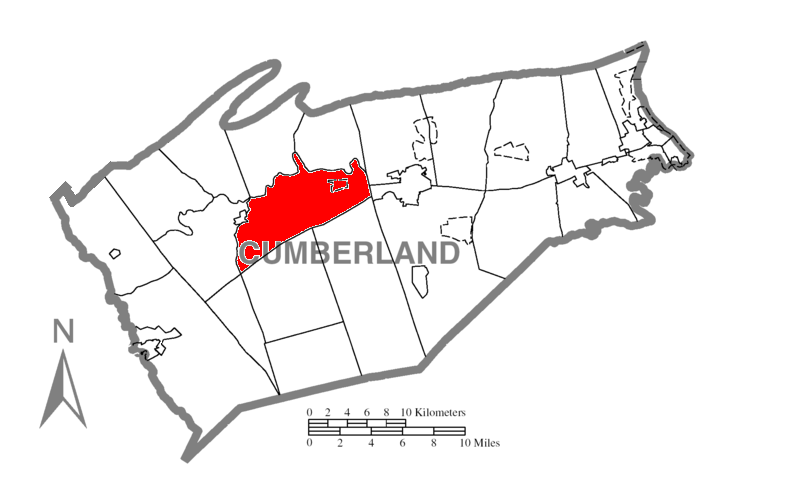
- Map of Cumberland County, Pennsylvania highlighting West Pennsboro Township

- Map of Cumberland County, Pennsylvania
- Country: United States
- State: Pennsylvania
- County: Cumberland

Government
  - Type: Board of Supervisors

Area
  - Total: 30.27 sq mi (78.41 km^{2})
  - Land: 30.23 sq mi (78.29 km^{2})
  - Water: 0.046 sq mi (0.12 km^{2})

Population (2010)
  - Total: 5,561
  - Estimate (2016): 5,614
  - Density: 185.7/sq mi (71.71/km^{2})
- Time zone: UTC-5 (Eastern (EST))
  - Summer (DST): UTC-4 (EDT)
- Area code: 717
- FIPS code: 42-041-83800
- Website: www.westpennsborotwp.org

Historical population
| Census | Pop. | Note | %± |
|---|---|---|---|
| 2000 | 5,263 | | — |
| 2010 | 5,561 | | 5.7% |
| 2016 (est.) | 5,614 | | 1.0% |
U.S. Decennial Census

West Pennsboro Township is a township that is located in Cumberland County, Pennsylvania, United States. The population was 5,561 at the time of the 2010 census.

== History ==
The John McCullough House was added to the National Register of Historic Places in 1978, though it has been demolished.

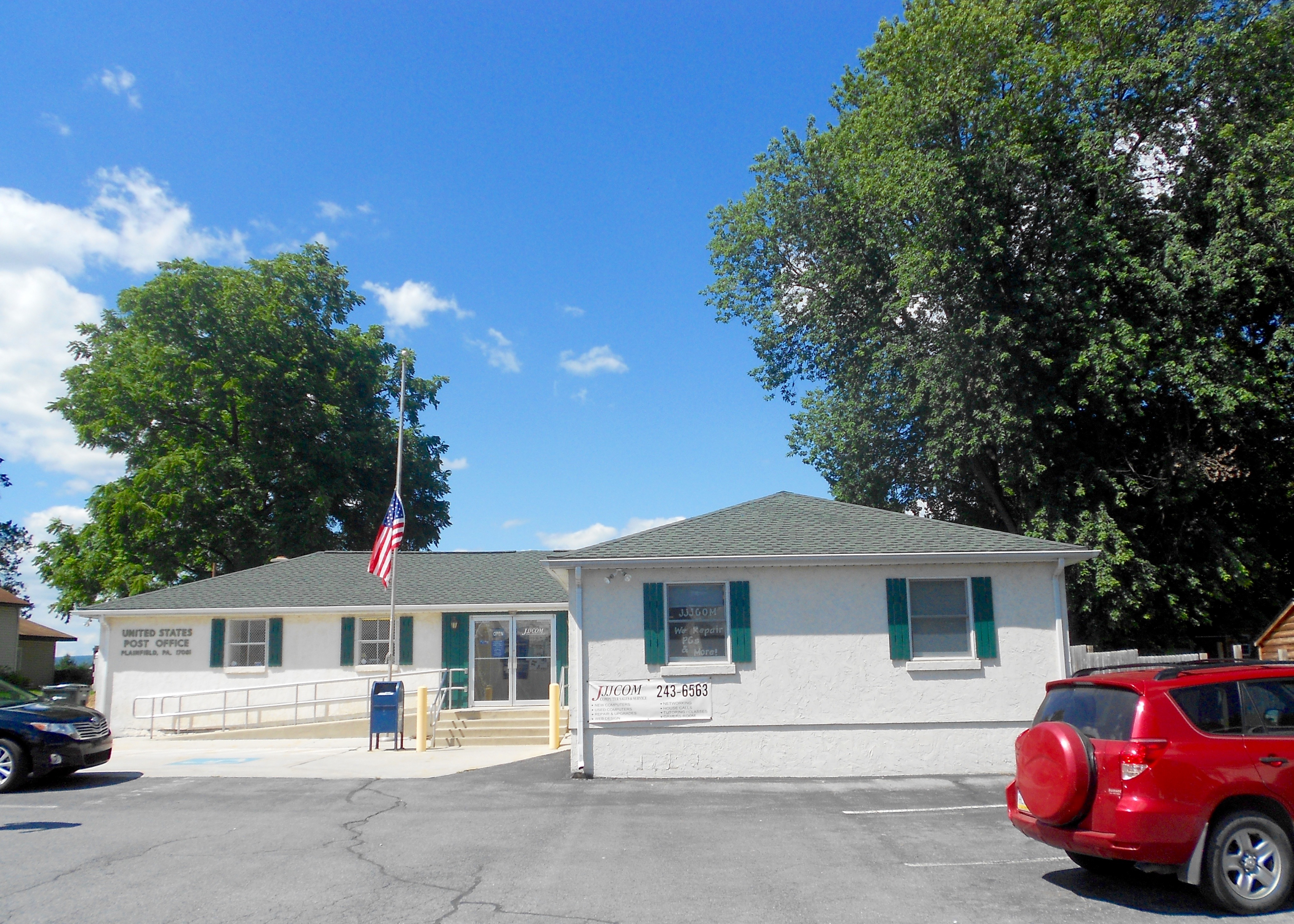
Post office in Plainfield

== Geography ==
The township is located just west of the geographic center of Cumberland County and is bordered to the east by the borough of Carlisle, the county seat. The borough of Newville is situated on part of the western border.

Conodoguinet Creek, a tributary of the Susquehanna River, forms the northern border of the township, and Big Spring Creek, a tributary of the Conodoguinet, forms most of the western boundary. The southern boundary follows U.S. Route 11.

There are several unincorporated communities located in the township. Plainfield, in the eastern part of the township, is a census-designated place. Elliottson, Greason, and West Hill are also in the east. Mount Rock is situated on U.S. 11 near the center point of the southern border, and Big Spring is near the southwest corner of the township.

According to the United States Census Bureau, the township has a total area of 30.3 square miles (78.4 km^{2}), of which 30.2 square miles (78.3 km^{2}) is land and 0.04 square miles (0.1 km^{2}), or 0.15%, is water.

== Demographics ==
As of the census of 2000, there were 5,263 people, 1,938 households, and 1,501 families residing in the township.

The population density was 172.6 inhabitants per square mile (66.6/km^{2}). There were 2,016 housing units at an average density of 66.1 per square mile (25.5/km^{2}).

The racial makeup of the township was 98.71% White, 0.30% African American, 0.15% Native American, 0.30% Asian, 0.02% Pacific Islander, 0.08% from other races, and 0.44% from two or more races. Hispanic or Latino of any race were 0.34% of the population.

There were 1,938 households, out of which 32.5% had children who were under the age of eighteen living with them, 68.2% were married couples living together, 5.8% had a female householder with no husband present, and 22.5% were non-families. Out of all of the householt were documented, 18.3% were made up of individuals, and 9.0% had someone living alone who was sixty-five years of age or older.

The average household size was 2.65 and the average family size was 3.00.

Within the township, the population was spread out, with 24.2% of residents who were under the age of 18, 6.8% from 18 to 24, 27.9% from 25 to 44, 25.7% from 45 to 64, and 15.4% who were 65 years of age or older. The median age was 40 years.

For every one hundred females, there were 97.0 males. For every one hundred females who were aged eighteen or older, there were 96.0 males.

The median income for a household in the township was $45,873, and the median income for a family was $50,208. Males had a median income of $35,966 compared with that of $24,438 for females.

The per capita income for the township was $19,382.

Approximately 6.2% of families and 8.4% of the population were living below the poverty line, including 15.4% of those who were under the age of eighteen and 5.0% of those who were aged sixty-five or older.
