= The Compiler =

- Truth is Mighty and will Prevail
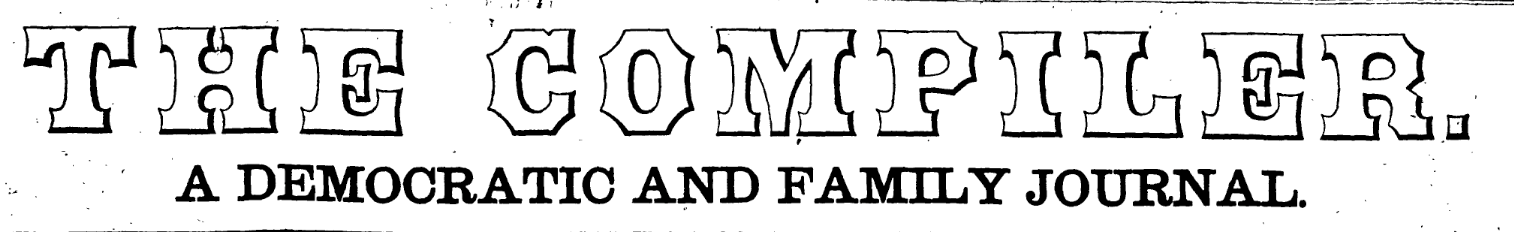

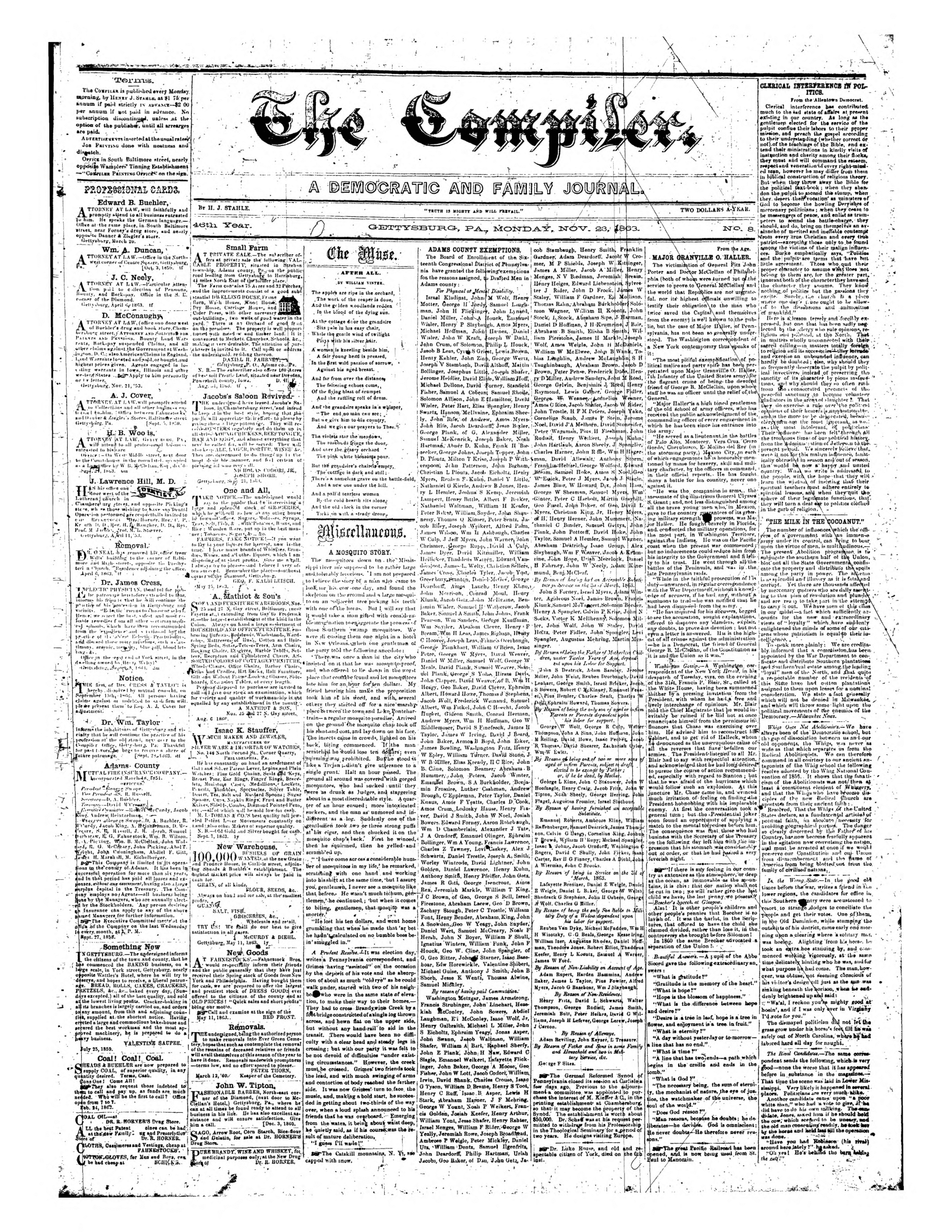
- The Compiler's front page on November 23, 1863
- Type: Weekly Newspaper
- Owner: Henry Stahle
- Editor: Henry Stahle; M. E. Doll
- Founded: 1857
- Ceased publication: 1866
- Political alignment: Democratic
- Language: English
- Headquarters: Gettysburg, Pennsylvania
- Country: United States
- Sister newspapers: The Republican Compiler; The Gettysburg Compiler
- OCLC number: 10153007

The Compiler was a newspaper founded in 1857 in Gettysburg, Pennsylvania, that also serviced the wider Adams County. The successor to The Republican Compiler, the newspaper's owner, publisher, and editor, Henry Stahle, rebranded the newspaper after the advent of the Republican Party, due to the newspaper catering to local Democrats.

== History ==
The newspaper would play a prominent role in the American Civil War, namely by being the main voice in Adams County opposing the war. Stahle was vehemently against a war with the south, and had his newspaper often ran pro-Democrat, anti-Black, and anti-War material. On May 4, 1863, the newspaper moved to a larger building and sought to take a more prominent role in state politics, hosting a conference of Democratic newspapers in Harrisburg on June 1, 1863.

The Compiler missed their first ever edition the week of July 7, 1863, the week after Gettysburg was under occupation of Confederate troops during the Battle of Gettysburg, two weeks later the newspaper reported the arrest of its own owner, Henry Stahle, by a U.S. Marshal who sent him to be detained in Fort McHenry in Baltimore under accusation of aiding the Confederates during the occupation. He would be released two weeks later without being formally charged of any crime. During Stahle's imprisonment his cousin, M. E. Doll, acted as owner, editor, and publisher in his place.

Despite weekly articles attacking the local Black community in Gettysburg, the newspaper still reported on the creation of Black Regiments in the Union Army, and printed abolitionist declarations sent to the newspaper. However, the newspaper strongly attacked the Gettysburg Address, calling it the "Relief of the Contrabands," and "The Negro Proclamation," warning their readers that the millions of freed slaves will move to the north and flood major U.S. cities.

After the Civil War in 1866, the newspaper ceased publication as Stahle rebranded The Compiler into The Gettysburg Compiler.
