= North Newton Township, Pennsylvania =

Township in Pennsylvania, US

Coordinates: 40°07′00″N 77°26′59″W

- Township
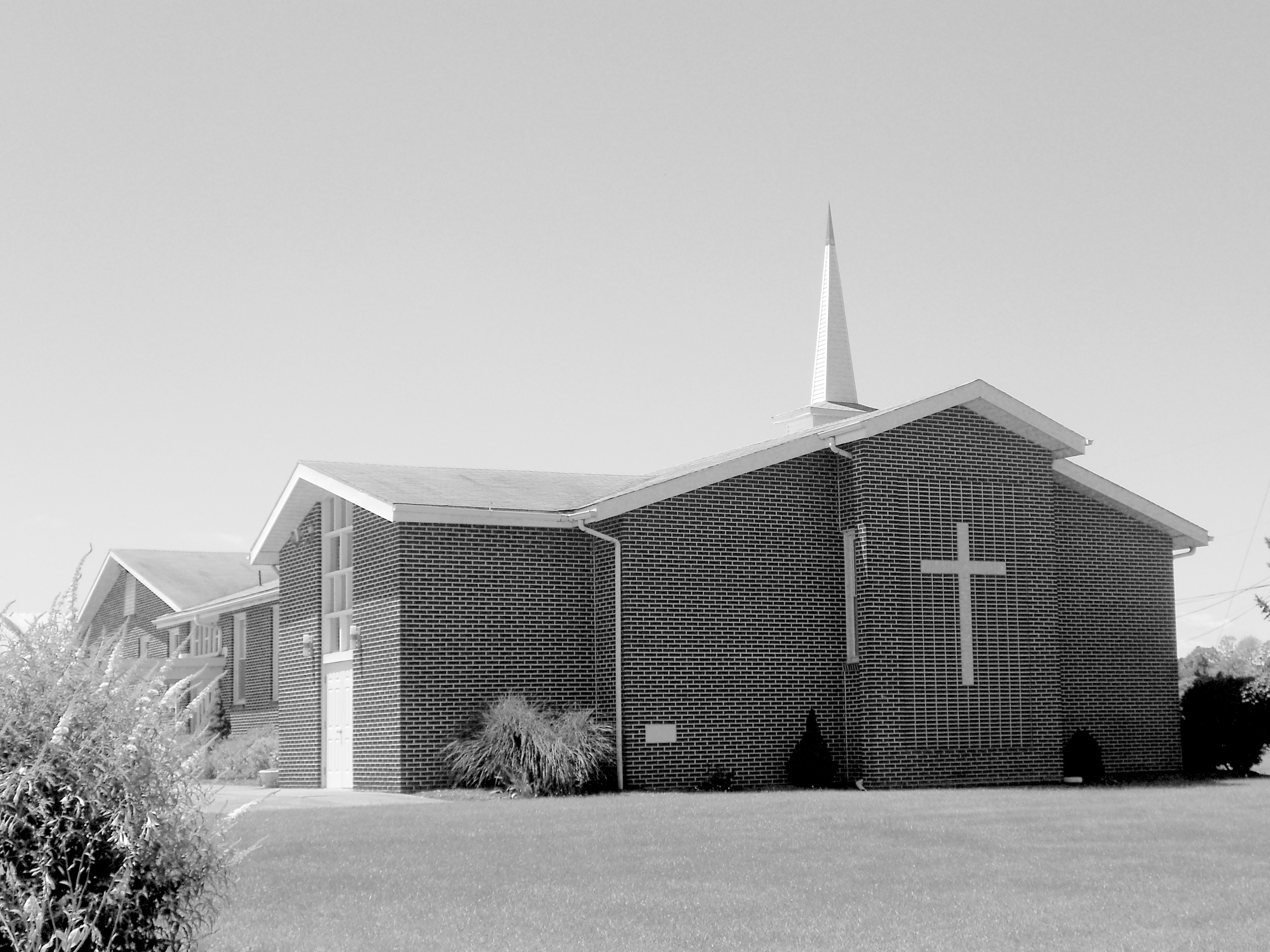
- Green Spring First Church of God

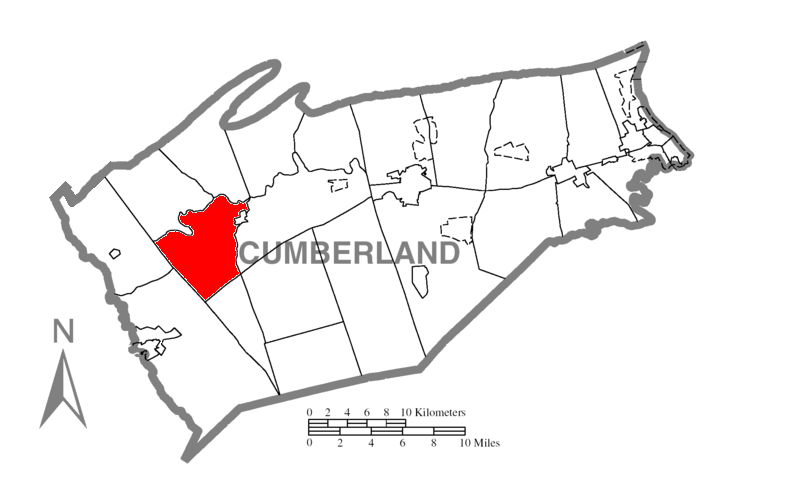
- Map of Cumberland County, Pennsylvania highlighting North Newton Township

- Map of Cumberland County, Pennsylvania
- Country: United States
- State: Pennsylvania
- County: Cumberland

Government
  - Type: Board of Supervisors

Area
  - Total: 22.85 sq mi (59.18 km^{2})
  - Land: 22.76 sq mi (58.96 km^{2})
  - Water: 0.085 sq mi (0.22 km^{2})

Population (2010)
  - Total: 2,430
  - Estimate (2016): 2,511
  - Density: 110.3/sq mi (42.59/km^{2})
- Time zone: UTC-5 (Eastern (EST))
  - Summer (DST): UTC-4 (EDT)
- Area code: 717
- FIPS code: 42-041-55248
- Website: northnewtontownship.com

Historical population
Census	Pop.	Note	%±
2000	2,169		—
2010	2,430		12.0%
2016 (est.)	2,511		3.3%
U.S. Decennial Census

North Newton Township is a township in Cumberland County, Pennsylvania, United States. The population was 2,546 at the 2020 census.

== Geography ==
The township is in western Cumberland County, bordered on the north by Conodoguinet Creek, on the east partially by Big Spring Creek, and on the south by U.S. Route 11. The borough of Newville, a separate municipality, is near the northeastern corner. Unincorporated communities in the township are Green Spring in the north and part of Stoughstown at the southeastern corner. The entire township is within the Cumberland Valley.

According to the United States Census Bureau, the township has a total area of 22.9 square miles (59.2 km^{2}), of which 22.8 square miles (59.0 km^{2}) is land and 0.1 square miles (0.2 km^{2}), or 0.37%, is water.

== Demographics ==
As of the census of 2000, there were 2,169 people, 766 households, and 614 families residing in the township. The population density was 96.4 inhabitants per square mile (37.2/km^{2}). There were 784 housing units at an average density of 34.8 per square mile (13.4/km^{2}). The racial makeup of the township was 98.39% White, 0.41% African American, 0.41% Asian, 0.23% from other races, and 0.55% from two or more races. Hispanic or Latino of any race were 0.65% of the population.

There were 766 households, out of which 35.1% had children under the age of 18 living with them, 73.2% were married couples living together, 4.6% had a female householder with no husband present, and 19.8% were non-families. 17.5% of all households were made up of individuals, and 9.4% had someone living alone who was 65 years of age or older. The average household size was 2.81 and the average family size was 3.19.

In the township the population was spread out, with 27.3% under the age of 18, 7.4% from 18 to 24, 27.8% from 25 to 44, 25.0% from 45 to 64, and 12.4% who were 65 years of age or older. The median age was 37 years. For every 100 females, there were 102.3 males. For every 100 females age 18 and over, there were 100.3 males.

The median income for a household in the township was $42,460, and the median income for a family was $46,680. Males had a median income of $31,331 versus $21,768 for females. The per capita income for the township was $16,719. About 3.8% of families and 6.0% of the population were below the poverty line, including 7.7% of those under age 18 and 7.8% of those age 65 or over.

== Board of Supervisors ==
- Ralph Fisher, Chairman
- Michael Gutshall, Vice Chairman
- Joshua Shotto
