= 3rd Pennsylvania Cavalry Regiment =

American Civil War Union Army unit

3rd Pennsylvania Cavalry, 60th regiment Pennsylvania Volunteers
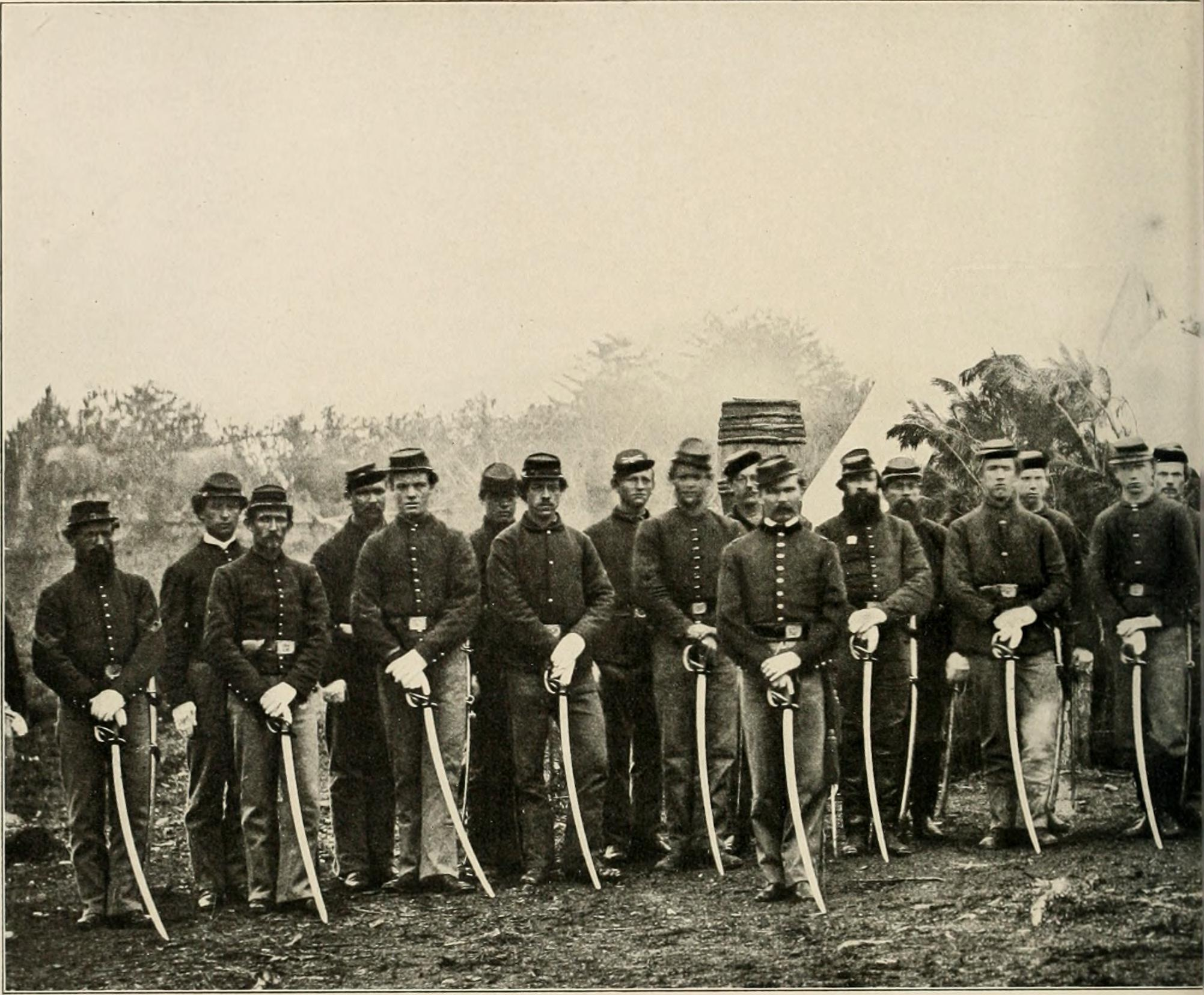
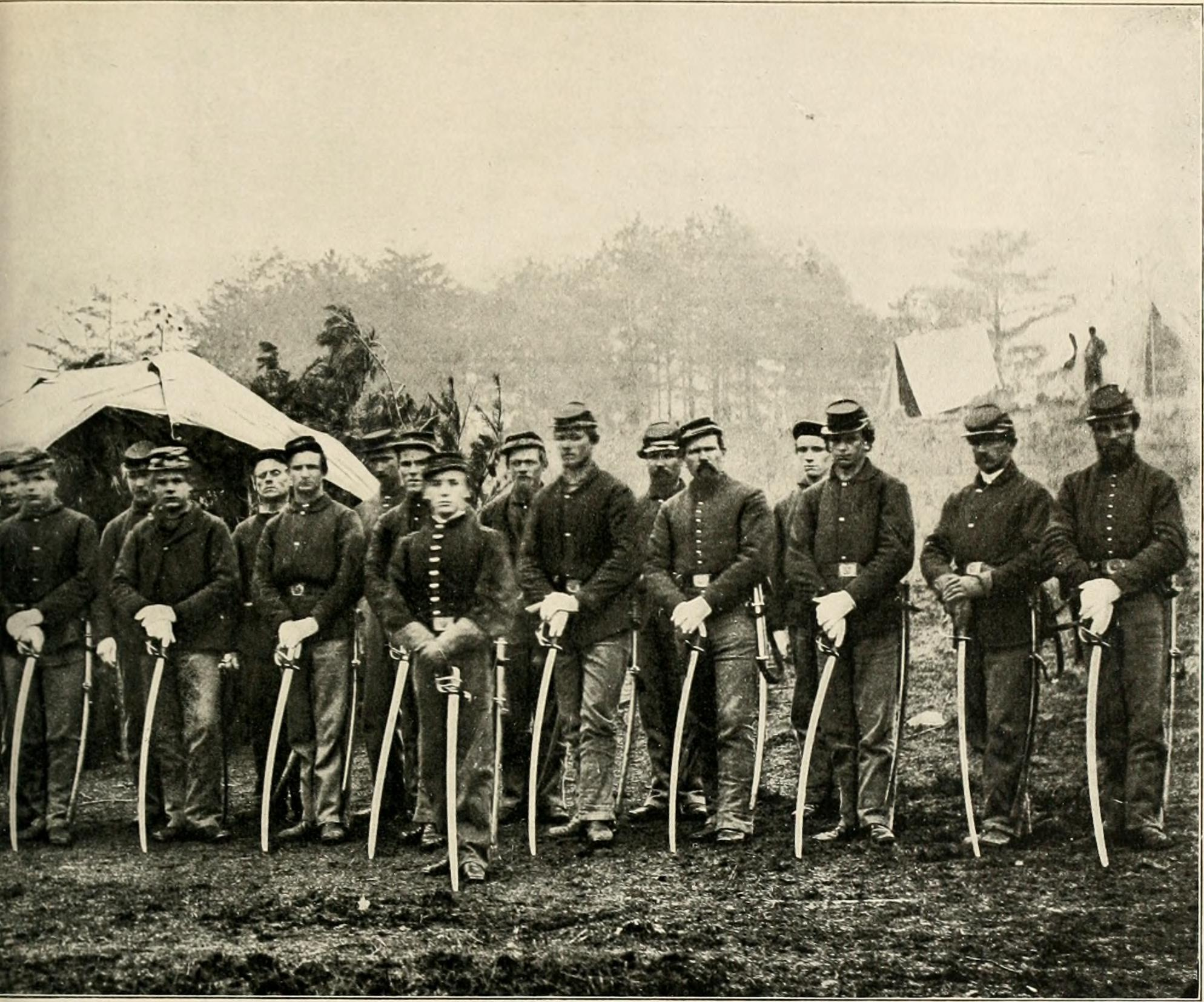
- Company D, 3rd Pennsylvania Cavalry
- Active: July 18, 1861 to August 15, 1865
- Country: United States
- Allegiance: Union
- Branch: Cavalry
- Engagements: Battle of Manassas; Battle of Antietam; Battle of Williamsburg; Battle of Fredericksburg; Battle of Kelly's Ford; Battle of Gettysburg; Siege of Petersburg (incomplete list)

Commanders
- Notable commanders: Col. William W. Averell

The 3rd Pennsylvania Cavalry Regiment (also known as the 60th Regiment, Pennsylvania Volunteers or Young's Kentucky Light Cavalry) was a cavalry regiment in the Union Army during the American Civil War.

The unit was recruited by Colonel William H. Young at Philadelphia during July and August 1861. Company A was formed around a local independent cavalry company, the Merchants' Troop of Philadelphia. As companies were formed, they were immediately sent to Camp Park in Washington, DC, for outfitting and training. Among those who assisted in their training was Lieutenant George A. Custer. The regiment was initially named the Kentucky Light Cavalry in an effort to influence citizens of that border state to remain in the Union. Although the first Pennsylvania cavalry unit formed in response to President Lincoln's call for volunteers, this initial designation caused it to lose its numbering priority to regiments formed later.

The regiment served in the Army of the Potomac through the rest of the Civil War, losing a total of 169 men. It became part of the 5th Pennsylvania Cavalry May 8, 1865.

A monument recognizing the unit's role in stopping forces under Major General J. E. B. Stuart from assaulting the rear of the Union lines on Cemetery Ridge on July 3, 1863, stands east of Gettysburg, Pennsylvania at the East Cavalry Battlefield.

== Commanders ==
- William H. Young Recruited Kentucky Light Cavalry regiment.
- William W. Averell Commanded from August 23, 1861, to September 26, 1862.
- John B. McIntosh Commanded from September 26, 1862, to July 21, 1864.
- Edward S. Jones Commanded from July 21, 1864, until mustered out, August 24, 1864.
- James W. Walsh Commanded reorganized 'Veteran Battalion'- those who reenlisted after expiration of three years service- from August 24, 1864.
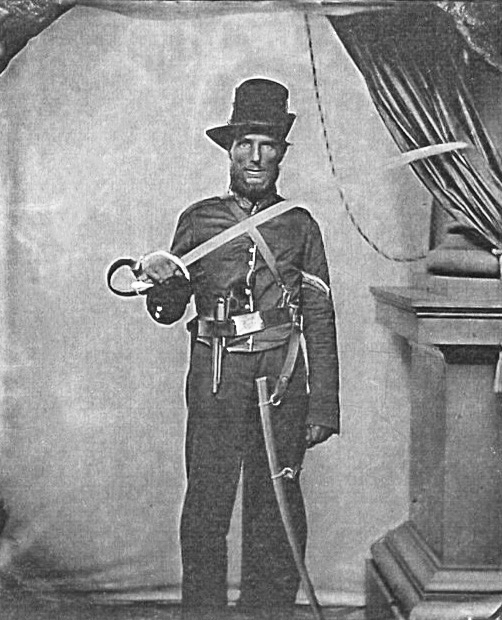
David Snavely, a private in the 3rd Pennsylvania Cavalry H Company

== Notable members ==
- William E. Miller, Commander of Company H, recipient of the Medal of Honor.

== See also ==
- List of Pennsylvania Civil War regiments
- Pennsylvania in the Civil War
