= John McCullough House =

Historic house in Pennsylvania, United States

- Formerly listed on the U.S. National Register of Historic Places
- Location within Pennsylvania Location within the United States
- Location: Southeast of Newville on Pennsylvania Route 233, West Pennsboro Township, Pennsylvania
- Coordinates: 40°9′29″N 77°23′3″W
- Area: 1.8 acres (0.73 ha)
- Built: 1804–1807
- Architectural style: Vernacular Georgian
- NRHP reference No.: 78002385

Significant dates
- Added to NRHP: December 20, 1978
- Removed from NRHP: June 25, 2013

John McCullough House was a historic home located at West Pennsboro Township in Cumberland County, Pennsylvania. It was built between 1804 and 1807, and was a 2 1/2-story, 5-bay brick dwelling with a gable roof in a vernacular Georgian style. It featured an unusual two-story, inset portico. The house has been demolished.

It was listed on the National Register of Historic Places in 1978.
