= Plainfield, Pennsylvania =

Unincorporated community in Pennsylvania, US

- Census-designated place
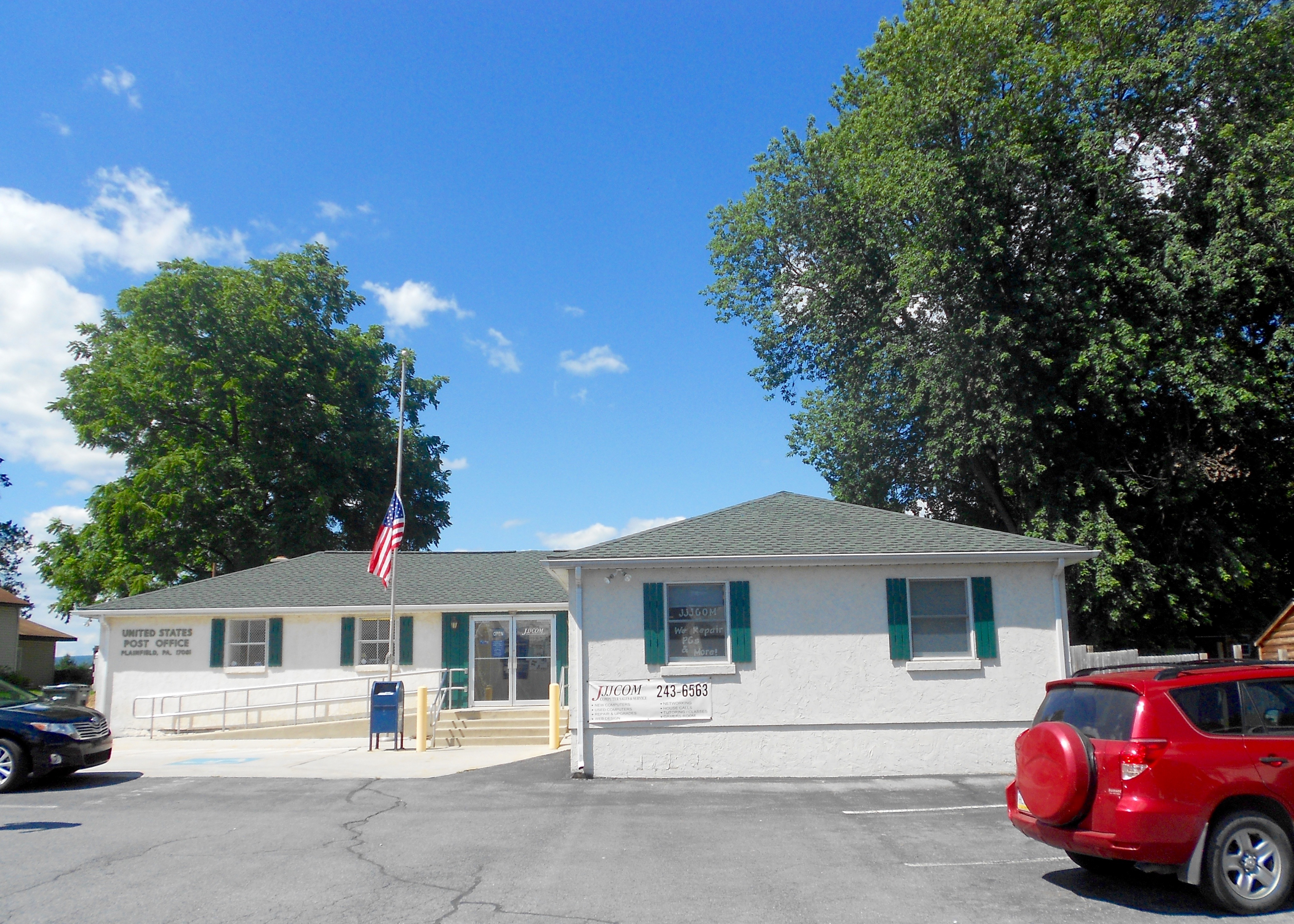
- The Plainfield post office

- Location of Plainfield in Pennsylvania Plainfield (the United States)
- Coordinates: 40°12′7″N 77°17′12″W
- Country: United States
- State: Pennsylvania
- County: Cumberland
- Township: West Pennsboro

Area
  - Total: 0.64 sq mi (1.67 km^{2})
  - Land: 0.64 sq mi (1.67 km^{2})
  - Water: 0 sq mi (0.00 km^{2})
- Elevation: 509 ft (155 m)

Population (2020)
  - Total: 443
  - Density: 685.8/sq mi (264.78/km^{2})
- Time zone: UTC-5 (Eastern (EST))
  - Summer (DST): UTC-4 (EDT)
- ZIP Code: 17081
- FIPS code: 42-61080
- GNIS feature ID: 1183987

Plainfield is a census-designated place (CDP) in Cumberland County, Pennsylvania, United States. The population was 399 at the 2010 census. It is part of the Harrisburg–Carlisle metropolitan statistical area.

== Geography ==
Plainfield is located in the eastern part of West Pennsboro Township at 40°12′7″N 77°17′12″W (40.202023, -77.286621), along Pennsylvania Route 641 (Main Street), which leads east 5 miles (8 km) to the center of Carlisle, the county seat, and west 6 miles (10 km) to Newville. The Pennsylvania Turnpike (Interstate 76) passes along the northern edge of the CDP, but the nearest exit is 8 miles (13 km) to the east, on the other side of Carlisle.

According to the U.S. Census Bureau, Plainfield has a total area of 0.64 square miles (1.67 km^{2}), all of which is land.

== Demographics ==
Historical population
Census	Pop.	Note	%±
2020	443		—
U.S. Decennial Census

As of the 2000 census, there were 376 people, 141 households, and 109 families residing in the CDP. The population density was 594.3 inhabitants per square mile (229.5/km^{2}). There were 162 housing units at an average density of 256.1 per square mile (98.9/km^{2}). The racial makeup of the CDP was 98.94% White, and 1.06% from two or more races. Hispanic or Latino of any race were 0.53% of the population.

There were 141 households, out of which 32.6% had children under the age of 18 living with them, 66.7% were married couples living together, 9.2% had a female householder with no husband present, and 22.0% were non-families. 17.0% of all households were made up of individuals, and 8.5% had someone living alone who was 65 years of age or older. The average household size was 2.67 and the average family size was 2.98.

In Plainfield, the population was spread out, with 23.9% under the age of 18, 6.4% from 18 to 24, 31.4% from 25 to 44, 25.0% from 45 to 64, and 13.3% who were 65 years of age or older. The median age was 39 years. For every 100 females, there were 102.2 males. For every 100 females age 18 and over, there were 100.0 males.

The median income for a household in the CDP was $27,500, and the median income for a family was $27,000. Males had a median income of $33,150 versus $23,875 for females. The per capita income for the CDP was $13,993. About 9.5% of families and 14.5% of the population were below the poverty line, including 25.9% of those under age 18 and none of those age 65 or over.

== Education ==
The school district is Big Spring School District.
