= West Hill, Pennsylvania =

Unincorporated community in Pennsylvania, US

- Unincorporated community
- Location within Pennsylvania Location within the United States
- Coordinates: 40°12′11″N 77°18′48″W
- Country: United States
- State: Pennsylvania
- County: Cumberland
- Township: West Pennsboro Township

Government
  - Type: Unincorporated area
- Elevation: 466 ft (142 m)
- Time zone: UTC-5 (Eastern (EST))
  - Summer (DST): UTC-4 (EDT)
- Area codes: 717 & 223
- GNIS feature ID: 1191041

West Hill is an unincorporated community in Cumberland County, Pennsylvania, United States. The community is in West Pennsboro Township, and is home of the township's Board.

== Notable residents ==
- Andrew G. Miller (1811-1880) Pennsylvania State Senator from 1869 to 1871.
