= Newville, Pennsylvania =

Borough in Pennsylvania, US

- Borough
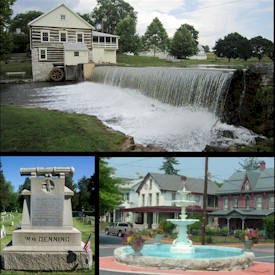
- Top - Laughlin Mill, Bottom left - William Denning Monument, Bottom right - Newville Fountain Square

- Seal

- Location of Newville in Cumberland County, Pennsylvania.

- Location in Pennsylvania and the United States Newville (the United States)
- Coordinates: 40°10′11″N 77°24′07″W
- Country: United States
- State: Pennsylvania
- County: Cumberland

Government
  - Type: Borough Council
  - Mayor: Michael Croutch

Area
  - Total: 0.43 sq mi (1.11 km^{2})
  - Land: 0.42 sq mi (1.09 km^{2})
  - Water: 0.0077 sq mi (0.02 km^{2})
- Elevation: 528 ft (161 m)

Population (2020)
  - Total: 1,376
  - Density: 3,280.7/sq mi (1,266.67/km^{2})
- Time zone: UTC-5 (Eastern (EST))
  - Summer (DST): UTC-4 (EDT)
- ZIP code: 17241
- Area code: 717
- FIPS code: 42-54320
- Website: www.newvilleborough.com

Newville is a borough in Cumberland County, Pennsylvania, United States. The borough is located west of Carlisle. The population was 1,376 at the 2020 census. It is part of the Harrisburg–Carlisle metropolitan statistical area.

Newville is served by the Big Spring School District.

== Geography ==
Newville is located in west-central Cumberland County at 40°10′11″N 77°24′7″W (40.169614, -77.402029), on the west side of Big Spring Creek, a tributary of Conodoguinet Creek and part of the Susquehanna River watershed. The borough is bordered on the north and west by North Newton Township and on the south and east by West Pennsboro Township.

Pennsylvania Route 641 passes through the borough as Main Street, leading west 9 miles (14 km) to Newburg and east 11 miles (18 km) to Carlisle, the county seat. Pennsylvania Route 233 (High Street) crosses PA 641 at the center of town and leads north 16 miles (26 km) to Landisburg and southeast 5 miles (8 km) to Interstate 81 near Dickinson. Pennsylvania Route 533 leads southwest from Newville 11 miles (18 km) to Shippensburg.

According to the U.S. Census Bureau, Newville has a total area of 0.43 square miles (1.11 km^{2}), of which 0.42 square miles (1.09 km^{2}) is land and 0.01 square miles (0.02 km^{2}), or 2.02%, is water.

== Demographics ==
Historical population
Census	Pop.	Note	%±
1820	412		—
1830	531		28.9%
1850	715		—
1860	885		23.8%
1870	907		2.5%
1880	1,547		70.6%
1890	1,562		1.0%
1900	1,655		6.0%
1910	1,449		−12.4%
1920	1,482		2.3%
1930	1,482		0.0%
1940	1,758		18.6%
1950	1,788		1.7%
1960	1,656		−7.4%
1970	1,631		−1.5%
1980	1,370		−16.0%
1990	1,349		−1.5%
2000	1,367		1.3%
2010	1,326		−3.0%
2020	1,376		3.8%

As of the census of 2000, there were 1,367 people, 579 households, and 386 families residing in the borough. The population density was 3,084.2 inhabitants per square mile (1,190.8/km^{2}). There were 620 housing units at an average density of 1,398.8 units per square mile (540.1 units/km^{2}). The racial makeup of the borough was 97.07% White, 0.88% African American, 0.22% Native American, 0.44% from other races, and 1.39% from two or more races. Hispanic or Latino of any race were 1.17% of the population.

There were 579 households, out of which 31.8% had children under the age of 18 living with them, 42.7% were married couples living together, 17.4% had a female householder with no husband present, and 33.3% were non-families. 29.4% of all households were made up of individuals, and 9.7% had someone living alone who was 65 years of age or older. The average household size was 2.31 and the average family size was 2.78.

In the borough, the population was spread out, with 25.2% under the age of 18, 10.4% from 18 to 24, 29.0% from 25 to 44, 19.7% from 45 to 64, and 15.7% who were 65 years of age or older. The median age was 34 years. For every 100 females, there were 95.3 males. For every 100 females age 18 and over, there were 87.5 males.

The median income for a household in the borough was $30,313, and the median income for a family was $34,423. Males had a median income of $28,214 versus $21,875 for females. The per capita income for the borough was $17,922. About 12.2% of families and 12.9% of the population were below the poverty line, including 18.6% of those under age 18 and 8.0% of those age 65 or over.

== History ==
Newville (New Village) was founded in 1790 when the Big Spring Presbyterian church laid out the town on their land and sold the lots. The first lots were sold to Samuel Finley, Hugh Holmes, William McElwain, Robert and David Officer, Isaac Jamison, and William McMonnagle. The town remained a part of Allemstraf Township until 1817 when it was granted a charter as a borough. In 1837 the Cumberland Valley Railroad came through the area, and in 1874 the borough was extended to the south to include the homes and businesses that had grown up along the railroad.

The Newville Post Office was established in 1800.

The Newville Historic District was added to the National Register of Historic Places in 2010.

== Notable people ==
On May 4, 2005, federal legislation was passed in Congress designating the post office facility in Newville as the Randall D. Shughart United States Post Office Building. The naming is in honor and commemoration of U.S. Army Sergeant First Class Randall Shughart, a Medal of Honor recipient whose courageous actions in combat cost him his life during the Battle of Mogadishu, Somalia, where he fought under Special Operations Command in October 1993. Shughart's story is depicted in Black Hawk Down, a 2001 film by Ridley Scott, based on the book Black Hawk Down: A Story of Modern War by Mark Bowden. Shughart was a native of Newville.

Other notable residents include:

- W. Paris Chambers, composer and cornet soloist
- Clement Finley, 10th Surgeon General of the United States Army
- Andy Oyler, Major League ballplayer
- Andrew G. Miller (1811–1880) Pennsylvania State Senator from 1869 to 1871.
- Zach Miller, musician and backup vocalist of Dr. Dog
