= Big Spring Creek (Pennsylvania) =

Body of water in Cumberland County, Pennsylvania, United States

Coordinates: 40°11′20″N 77°23′31″W

Big Spring Creek is a 5.0-mile-long (8.0 km) tributary of Conodoguinet Creek in Cumberland County, Pennsylvania in the United States.

Big Spring Creek, the fifth largest spring in Pennsylvania with a median flow of 18 million US gallons/27 cfs (0.7 m³/s) a day, emerges near U.S. Route 11, approximately 8 miles (13 km) northeast of Shippensburg, and feeds Conodoguinet Creek near Newville.

== See also ==
- List of rivers of Pennsylvania
