= U.S. Route 30 in West Virginia =

Highway in West Virginia

U.S. Route 30
- US 30 highlighted in red

Route information
- Maintained by WVDOH
- Length: 3.49 mi (5.62 km)
- Existed: 1927–present
- Tourist routes: Lincoln Highway

Major junctions
- West end: US 30 / SR 11 at the Ohio state line in Chester
- WV 2 in Chester; WV 8 near Chester
- East end: US 30 at the Pennsylvania state line near Hookstown, PA

Location
- Country: United States
- State: West Virginia
- Counties: Hancock

Highway system
- United States Numbered Highway System; List; Special; Divided; West Virginia State Highway System; Interstate; US; State
| ← WV 29 | → WV 31 |

U.S. Route 30 (US 30) is the portion of the United States Numbered Highway System that travels east–west across the state of West Virginia along what was previously West Virginia Route 79 (WV 79).

== Route description ==
US 30 in West Virginia starts off at the corner of the Ohio River, where it immediately runs into Chester. After about 0.4 miles (0.64 km), the highway has an interchange with WV 2. The freeway portion that was carried over from Ohio ends shortly after. After an intersection with WV 8, US 30 continues into Pennsylvania. The overall length is 3.49 miles (5.62 km), making this segment of US 30 the shortest.

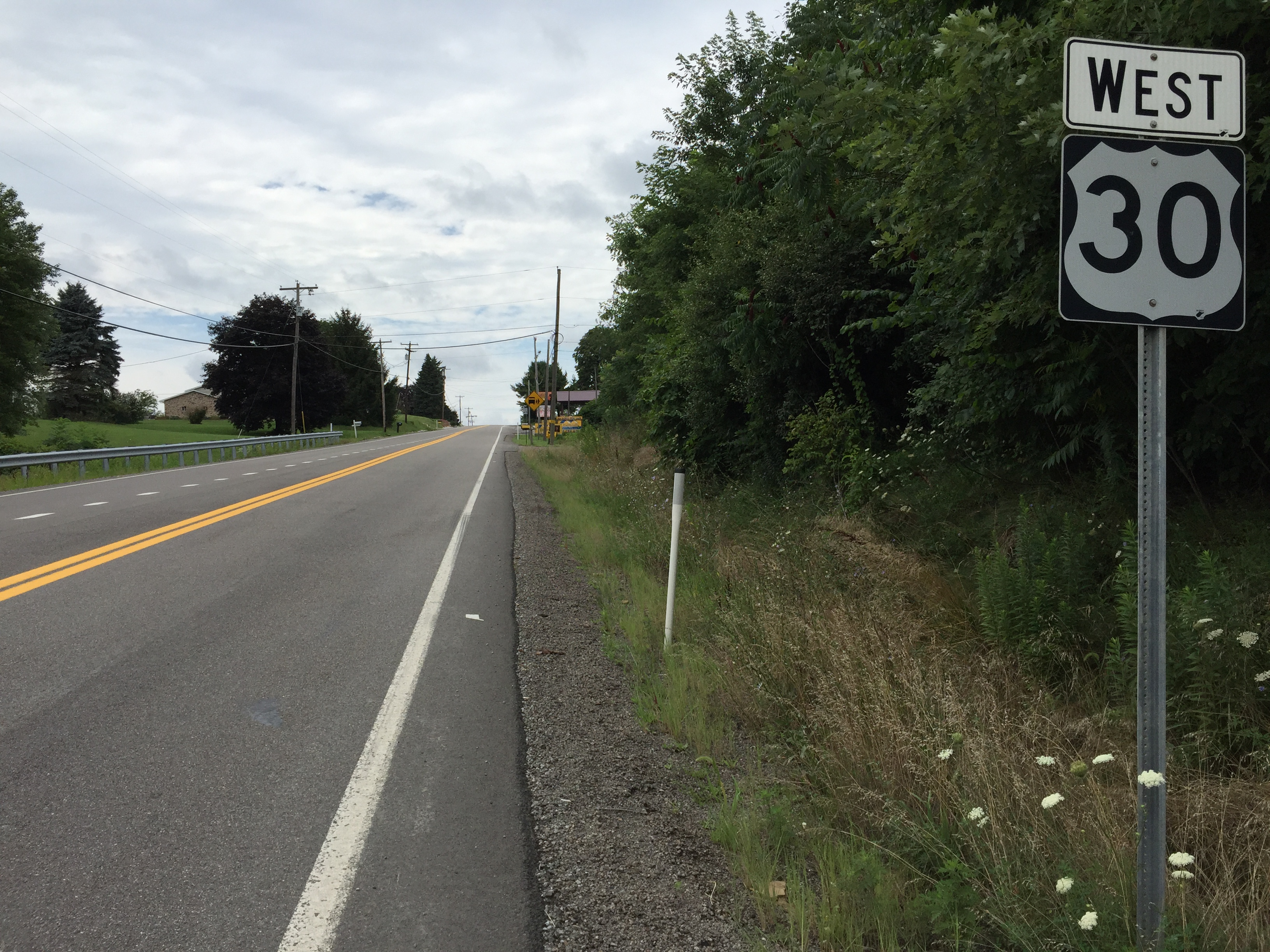
View west along US 30 at WV 8 in Lawrenceville

== History ==
The Lincoln Highway was realigned in 1927, and it was redesignated as US 30 for about five miles (8.0 km) in West Virginia.

== Junction list ==
The entire route is in Hancock County.

| Location | mi | km | Destinations | Notes |
|---|---|---|---|---|
| Ohio River | 0.00 | 0.00 | US 30 west / SR 11 north / SR 39 west – East Liverpool | Continuation into Ohio |
| Ohio River | 0.00 | 0.00 | SR 39 east – Midland | Jennings Randolph Bridge; interchange extends into Ohio |
| Chester | 0.4– 0.7 | 0.64– 1.1 | WV 2 south – Chester | East end of freeway, northern terminus of WV 2 |
| | 2.5 | 4.0 | WV 8 south – New Manchester | Northern terminus of WV 8 |
| | 3.49 | 5.62 | US 30 east (Lincoln Highway) – Pittsburgh | Continuation into Pennsylvania |
1.000 mi = 1.609 km; 1.000 km = 0.621 mi

U.S. Route 30
| Previous state: Ohio | West Virginia | Next state: Pennsylvania |
