= Lawrenceville, West Virginia =

- Unincorporated community
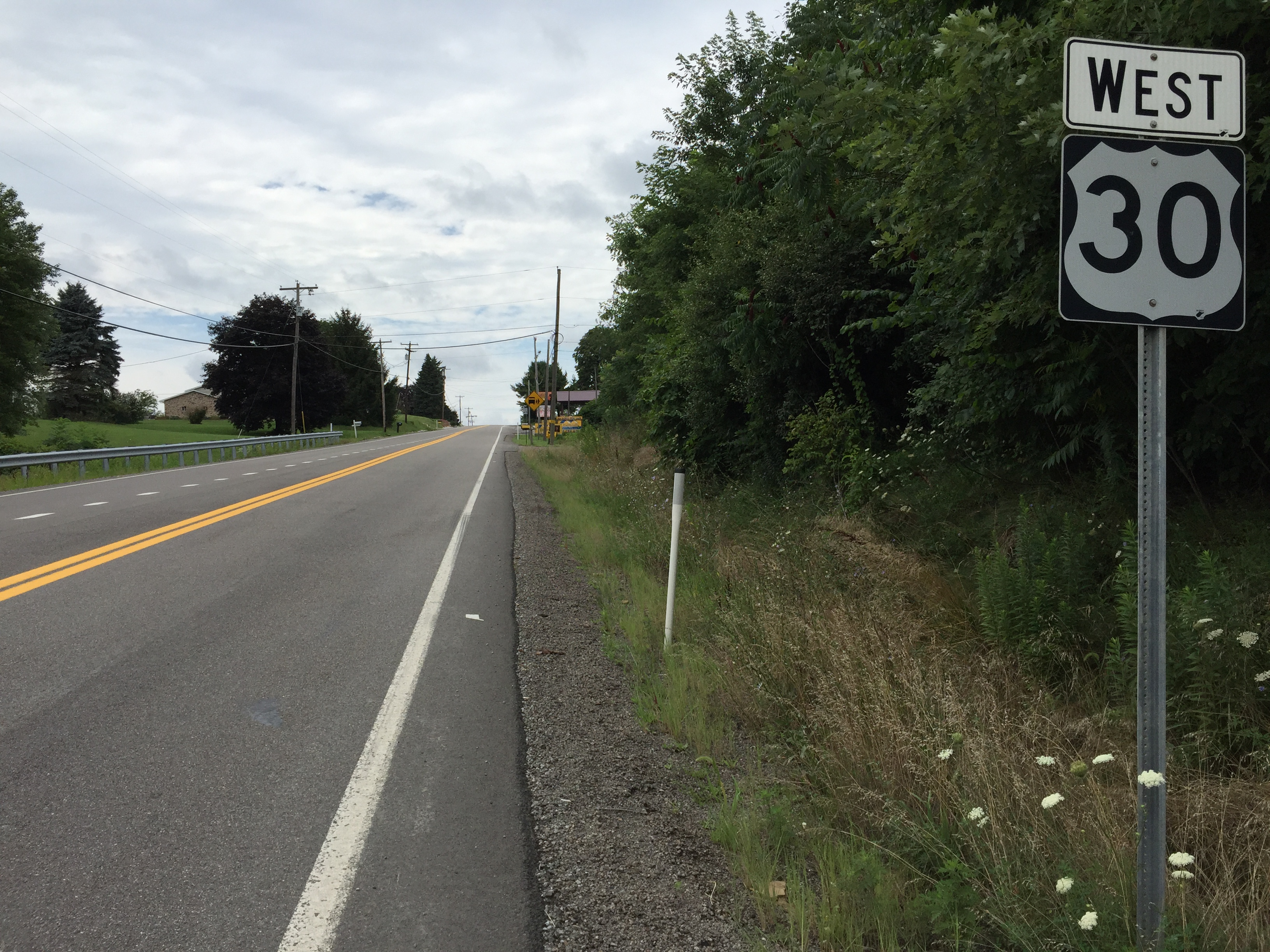
- U.S. Route 30 at West Virginia State Route 8 in Lawrenceville

- Location within West Virginia Location within the United States
- Coordinates: 40°37′03″N 80°32′37″W
- Country: United States
- State: West Virginia
- County: Hancock
- Time zone: UTC-5 (Eastern (EST))
  - Summer (DST): UTC-4 (EDT)
- ZIP codes: 26034
- GNIS feature ID: 1554924

Lawrenceville is an unincorporated community in northeastern Hancock County, West Virginia, United States. It is directly adjacent to the city of Chester, and has been closely connected to it throughout its history. It is part of the Weirton–Steubenville metropolitan area.

== Geography ==
Lawrenceville is located on the East Liverpool South U.S. Geological Survey Map, and lies at an elevation of 978 feet (289 m). The GNIS ID codes for Lawrenceville is 1554924. Little Blue Run Lake, once the largest coal ash impound in the United States, is near Lawrenceville.
