= U.S. Route 30 in Pennsylvania =

Section of U.S. Route in Pennsylvania

U.S. Route 30
- US 30 highlighted in red

Route information
- Maintained by PennDOT, DRPA
- Length: 333 mi (536 km)
- Existed: 1926–present
- Tourist routes: Exton Bypass Scenic Byway

Major junctions
- West end: US 30 at the West Virginia state line near Hookstown
- I-376 / Orange Belt / PA 60 in Robinson Township; I-79 near Carnegie; I-76 Toll / Penna Turnpike in North Huntingdon Township; US 220 in Bedford; I-70 in Breezewood; I-81 in Chambersburg; I-83 in York; I-476 in Villanova; I-76 in Philadelphia; I-95 in Philadelphia
- East end: I-676 / US 30 at the New Jersey state line in Philadelphia

Location
- Country: United States
- State: Pennsylvania
- Counties: Beaver, Allegheny, Westmoreland, Somerset, Bedford, Fulton, Franklin, Adams, York, Lancaster, Chester, Delaware, Montgomery, Philadelphia

Highway system
- United States Numbered Highway System; List; Special; Divided; Pennsylvania State Route System; Interstate; US; State; Scenic; Legislative
← PA 29	→ PA 31
← US 1	PA 1	→ PA 2

U.S. Route 30 (US 30) is a United States Numbered Highway that runs east–west across the southern part of Pennsylvania, passing through Pittsburgh and Philadelphia on its way from the West Virginia state line east to the Benjamin Franklin Bridge over the Delaware River into New Jersey.

In Pennsylvania, US 30 runs along or near the transcontinental Lincoln Highway, an auto trail which ran from San Francisco to New York City before the U.S. Numbered Highways were designated. The Lincoln Highway turned northeast at Philadelphia, however, using present US 1 and its former alignments to cross the Delaware River into Trenton, New Jersey.

Points of interest along US 30 include the Gettysburg Battlefield, Dutch Wonderland, the Flight 93 National Memorial, Fort Ligonier, Westmoreland Mall, Jennerstown Speedway Complex, Idlewild and Soak Zone, and Independence Mall at the Independence National Historical Park.

== Route description ==
=== West Virginia to Pittsburgh ===
US 30 enters Pennsylvania from West Virginia in Beaver County, heading east along the two-lane undivided Lincoln Highway. The road passes through rural areas and comes to an intersection with Pennsylvania Route 168 (PA 168) south of Hookstown, where it briefly becomes a divided highway. US 30 continues as an undivided road, turning northeast and then southeast before it comes to a junction with the western terminus of PA 151. The road heads southeast and crosses PA 18 in Harshaville.

US 30 enters Allegheny County and continues east along the Lincoln Highway, reaching Clinton. Here, the route turns to the southeast and comes to an interchange with the PA 576 toll road to the southwest of Pittsburgh International Airport, where the route briefly becomes a divided highway. The road continues southeast and reaches Imperial, where it passes under the Montour Trail.

US 30 heads into developed areas, crossing Steubenville Pike, and comes to a partial cloverleaf interchange with the US 22 freeway, where US 30 heads east in concurrency with US 22, and PA 978 begins (running southeast). US 22/US 30 runs east as a four-lane freeway through suburban areas, coming to a partial cloverleaf interchange with Oakdale Road that serves Hankey Farms. Farther east, the freeway has a westbound exit and eastbound entrance with McKee Road that provides access to Oakdale to the south.

I-376/US 22/US 30 heads southeast as the four-lane Penn-Lincoln Parkway, reaching an interchange with Ridge Road. The freeway comes to a westbound exit and eastbound entrance with Campbell's Run Road, where it widens to six lanes. The highway curves to the east and meets I-79 at an interchange. Past this interchange, I-376/US 22/US 30 narrows to two lanes eastbound and heads into Rosslyn Farms, turning southeast and coming to a westbound exit and eastbound entrance with Rosslyn Road that serves Rosslyn Farms.

The freeway crosses into Carnegie. It reaches a bus-only eastbound exit and westbound entrance connecting to Pittsburgh Regional Transit (PRT)'s West Busway before passing over a Pittsburgh and Ohio Central Railroad line. The highway passes over Chartiers Creek and another Pittsburgh and Ohio Central Railroad line as it leaves Carnegie and comes to the PA 50 interchange. I-376/US 22/US 30 narrows to four lanes, passing under a Wheeling and Lake Erie Railway line and curving northeast into Green Tree.

The freeway reaches the PA 121 interchange, where it gains a third westbound lane, and heads east, entering Pittsburgh and coming to a westbound exit and eastbound entrance with Parkway Center Drive. The highway turns north and reaches a westbound exit and eastbound entrance with US 19, where US 19 joins I-376/US 22/US 30 on the Penn-Lincoln Parkway. Within this interchange, the road has an eastbound runaway truck ramp and passes under a ramp carrying both directions of US 19 Truck.

The freeway widens to six lanes and passes under a Wheeling and Lake Erie Railway line before reaching an interchange with PA 51, where US 19 Truck joins the Penn-Lincoln Parkway from PA 51 and US 19 splits from the Penn-Lincoln Parkway by heading north along with PA 51. Past this interchange, I-376/US 19 Truck/US 22/US 30 narrows to four lanes and passes under Mount Washington in the Fort Pitt Tunnel.

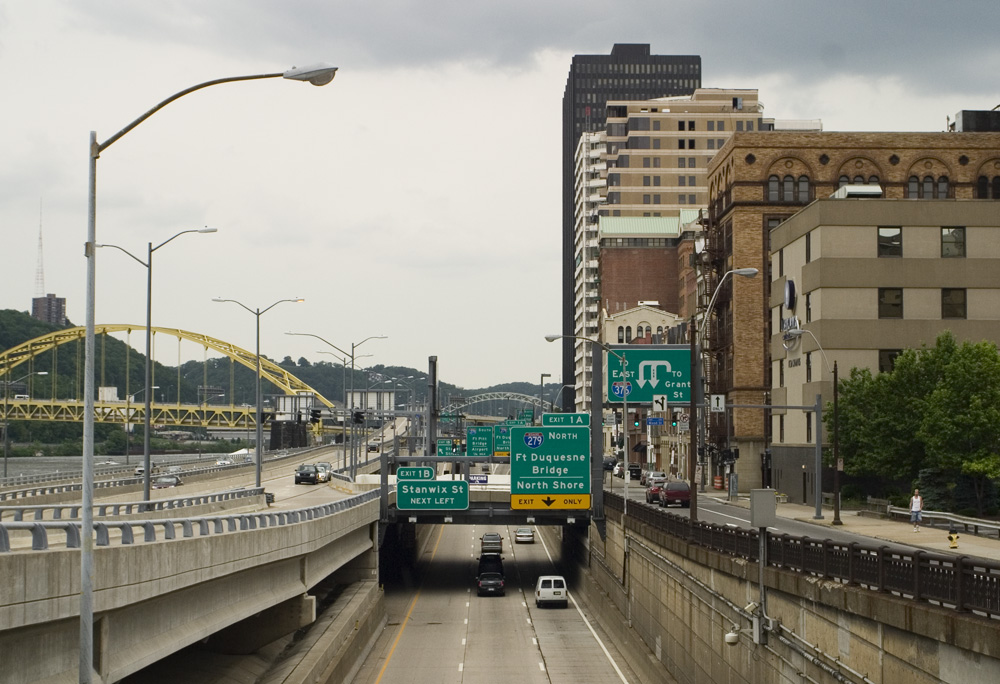
US 30 westbound concurrent with I-376 and US 22 on the Penn-Lincoln Parkway in Pittsburgh

After emerging from the Fort Pitt Tunnel, the freeway passes over Norfolk Southern Railway's Mon Line and PA 837, coming to a westbound exit and eastbound entrance that connects to northbound PA 837. The Penn-Lincoln Parkway heads onto the Fort Pitt Bridge, a double-decker bridge carrying four lanes in each direction, and passes over CSX Transportation's Pittsburgh Subdivision railroad line and the Monongahela River as it heads into Downtown Pittsburgh at Point State Park and comes to an interchange with the southern terminus of I-279, where US 19 Truck heads north along I-279 and I-376/US 22/US 30 continues east along the Penn-Lincoln Parkway. The I-279 interchange also includes eastbound exits and westbound entrances with Boulevard of the Allies/Liberty Avenue and Fort Duquesne Boulevard that serve Downtown Pittsburgh.

The four-lane freeway heads east-southeast between Downtown Pittsburgh to the north and the Monongahela River to the south, reaching a partial interchange with Stanwix Street with no eastbound exit. The highway passes under the Smithfield Street Bridge and reaches an interchange with Grant Street, where it widens to six lanes. I-376/US 22/US 30 pass under the Panhandle Bridge carrying PRT's Pittsburgh Light Rail line and then the Liberty Bridge before the lanes split as it reaches a westbound ramp to Second Avenue north of the South Tenth Street Bridge and south of the Duquesne University campus.

Past this point, the highway continues east between urban areas to the north and the Monongahela River to the south, with the Three Rivers Heritage Trail in the median. The freeway comes to an interchange connecting to PA 885 and Forbes Avenue north of the Birmingham Bridge, at which point the trail leaves the median of the freeway and the river heads further south from the freeway. I-376/US 22/US 30 head southeast, with the Three Rivers Heritage Trail parallel to the south, and reaches a westbound exit and eastbound entrance with PA 885. The highway turns east away from the trail and passes over the Allegheny Valley Railroad's P&W Subdivision line.

The freeway comes to an interchange with Beechwood Boulevard before it narrows to four lanes and passes under the southern portion of Squirrel Hill in the Squirrel Hill Tunnel. Past the tunnel, I-376/US 22/US 30 heads through wooded areas and passes over Ninemile Run in Frick Park. The highway leaves Pittsburgh as it comes to an interchange with Braddock Avenue that serves Edgewood and Swissvale. The freeway continues east through suburban areas in Edgewood, passing under Norfolk Southern Railway's Pittsburgh Line and the PRT's Martin Luther King Jr. East Busway.

I-376/US 22/US 30 turns to the northeast and heads through a corner of Braddock Hills before entering Wilkinsburg. In Wilkinsburg, the freeway comes to an interchange with the southern terminus of PA 8, where US 30 splits from I-376/US 22 on the Penn-Lincoln Parkway by heading southeast at-grade on Ardmore Boulevard.

=== Pittsburgh to Breezewood ===
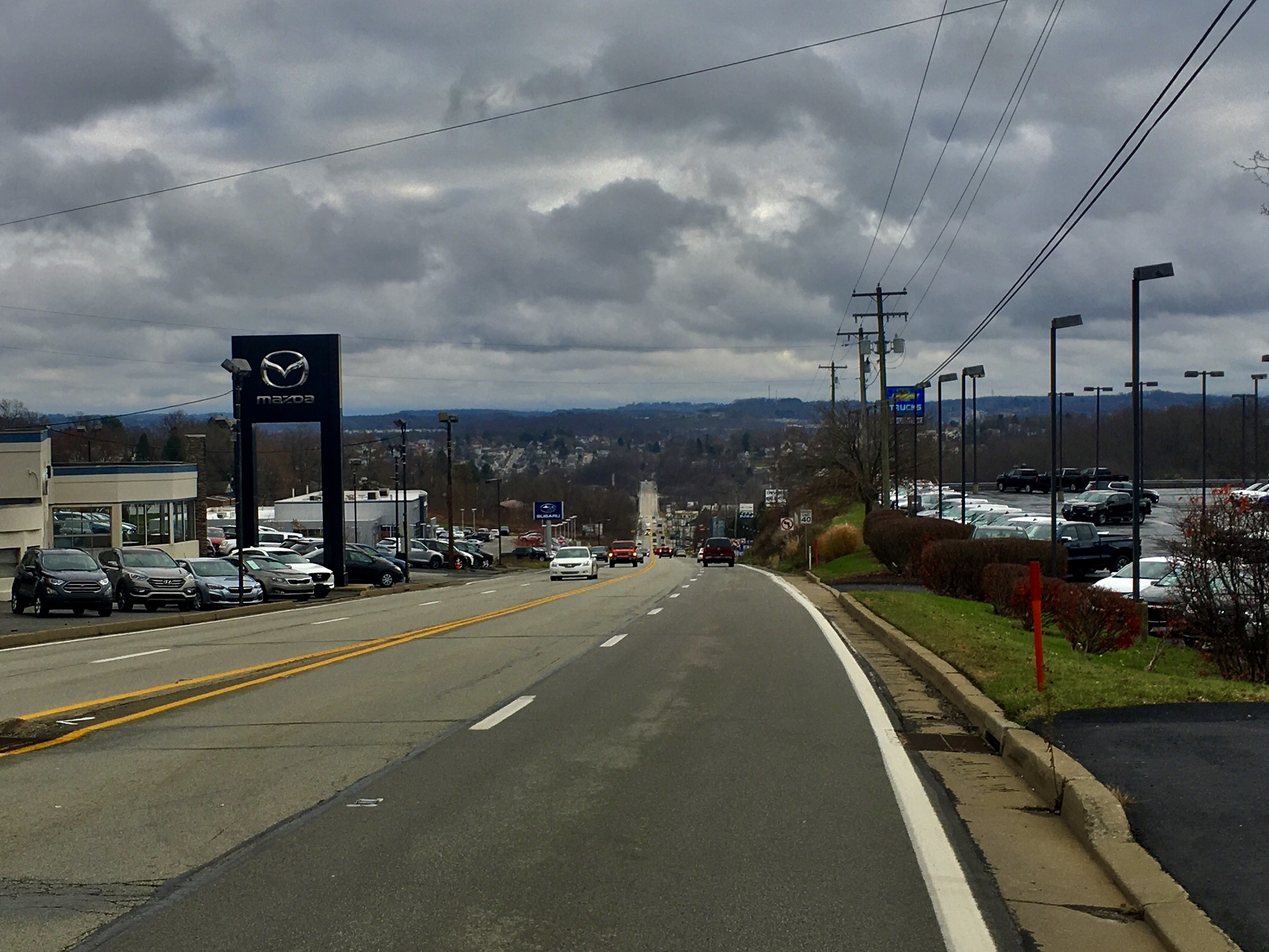
US 30 eastbound in North Huntingdon Township

US 30 follows Ardmore Boulevard, a five-lane divided highway with two eastbound lanes and three westbound lanes, and enters Forest Hills, running through suburban development as it curves to the south. The road narrows to two westbound lanes before it curves to the southeast. The route turns to the south-southeast and passes through the center of Forest Hills.

US 30 gains a third eastbound lane before it skirts the border between North Braddock to the west and Chalfant to the east as it comes to an eastbound exit and westbound entrance with Electric Avenue. Past this interchange, the route becomes the four-lane undivided Lincoln Highway and heads south, crossing into East Pittsburgh. The road crosses over Bessemer Avenue on a bridge before it curves southeast and heads onto George Westinghouse Bridge, where it passes over Braddock Avenue, a Union Railroad line, Norfolk Southern Railway's Pittsburgh Line, Turtle Creek, and Norfolk Southern Railway's Port Perry Branch.

After passing over Turtle Creek, US 30 leaves East Pittsburgh, turning into a divided highway and passing over East Pittsburgh McKeesport Boulevard. The route comes to an interchange with Greensburg Pike and becomes undivided before it enters East McKeesport as Greensburg Avenue. Here, the road turns northeast, curving east and intersecting the northern terminus of PA 148. US 30 runs east-southeast as it leaves East McKeesport and continues along the Lincoln Highway. Along this stretch, the route briefly becomes a divided highway at intersections with Luehm Avenue and PA 48.

US 30 enters Westmoreland County in the Laurel Highlands region and continues south along the four-lane undivided Lincoln Highway, curving southeast and passing through Stewartsville. The road briefly becomes a divided highway at intersections with Leger Road/Carpenter Lane and Center Highway/Robbins Station Road. The route turns to the east and comes to an eastbound exit and entrance with Main Street in Fairmont before entering Irwin.

US 30 gains a center left-turn lane before it leaves Irwin and becomes a four-lane divided highway as it comes to the Irwin interchange with the Pennsylvania Turnpike (I-76). Past this interchange, the median becomes a center-left turn lane.

US 30 runs along the southern border of Adamsburg and becomes a divided highway as it reaches an interchange with Edna Road serving Adamsburg. The road becomes five lanes with a center left-turn lane and passes through Lincoln Heights and runs along the southern border of Jeannette.

Past Jeannette, US 30 curves southeast and turns into a four-lane divided highway, coming to an interchange with the PA 66 toll road. After this interchange, the route briefly widens to six lanes before curving east and becoming a five-lane road with a center left-turn lane, turning into a four-lane divided highway as it passes south of the Greengate Centre shopping center and comes to a bridge over the Southwest Pennsylvania Railroad's Radebaugh Subdivision line.

US 30 becomes a freeway that bypasses Greensburg to the south and curves southeast, reaching an eastbound exit and westbound entrance with West Pittsburgh Street. The road enters Greensburg and comes to a partial cloverleaf interchange with PA 136. The route runs along the southwest border of Southwest Greensburg and reaches a partial cloverleaf interchange with US 119/PA 66 Business (PA 66 Bus.)/PA 819.

Past this interchange, US 30 passes over the Southwest Pennsylvania Railroad's Greensburg Industrial Track line and the Five Star Trail, at which point it heads through a section of South Greensburg before it comes to a right-in/right-out interchange with Cedar Street. At this point, the freeway curves northeast, reaching a diamond interchange with Mt. Pleasant Road. The road passes through a section of Greensburg and comes to an eastbound exit and westbound entrance with PA 130. A short distance later, the freeway section ends at the westbound exit and eastbound entrance with East Pittsburgh Street to the east of Greensburg.

US 30 heads east as the six-lane, divided Lincoln Highway and reaches an interchange serving Westmoreland Mall to the south of the road. The road narrows to four lanes and continues east-southeast. Farther east, the route runs through rural areas with some development, passing to the north of Arnold Palmer Regional Airport as it widens to six lanes and comes to an intersection with PA 981 to the south of Latrobe.

US 30 narrows to four lanes before it reaches a cloverleaf interchange with PA 982 that provides access to Latrobe to the north and Youngstown to the south. The median of the road widens and the westbound lanes cross the Loyalhanna Creek, at which point the Loyalhanna Creek runs in the median of US 30. The route comes to an intersection with the southern terminus of PA 217. Past this intersection, US 30 winds southeast through a gap in Chestnut Ridge, with the eastbound lanes crossing the Loyalhanna Creek.

At this point, the road heads east as a four-lane divided highway with the Loyalhanna Creek parallel to the south, passing to the north of the Idlewild and Soak Zone amusement park. The median widens again, and the route intersects the southern terminus of PA 259 in Millbank. US 30 curves south and turns to the east. The road curves southeast and the median narrows, at which point it heads along the southwest border of Ligonier as a four-lane divided highway. The route crosses PA 711 and passes to the south of Fort Ligonier. US 30 leaves Ligonier and narrows to a two-lane undivided road, intersecting the northern terminus of PA 381. The route passes through the Laughlintown and runs along the southern border of Laurel Mountain. Past the Laurel Mountain, the road ascends Laurel Hill and comes to a westbound runaway truck ramp. Further up the hill, the route reaches a westbound truck brake check station, then briefly becomes a divided highway through a sharp turn before reaching another westbound truck brake check station.

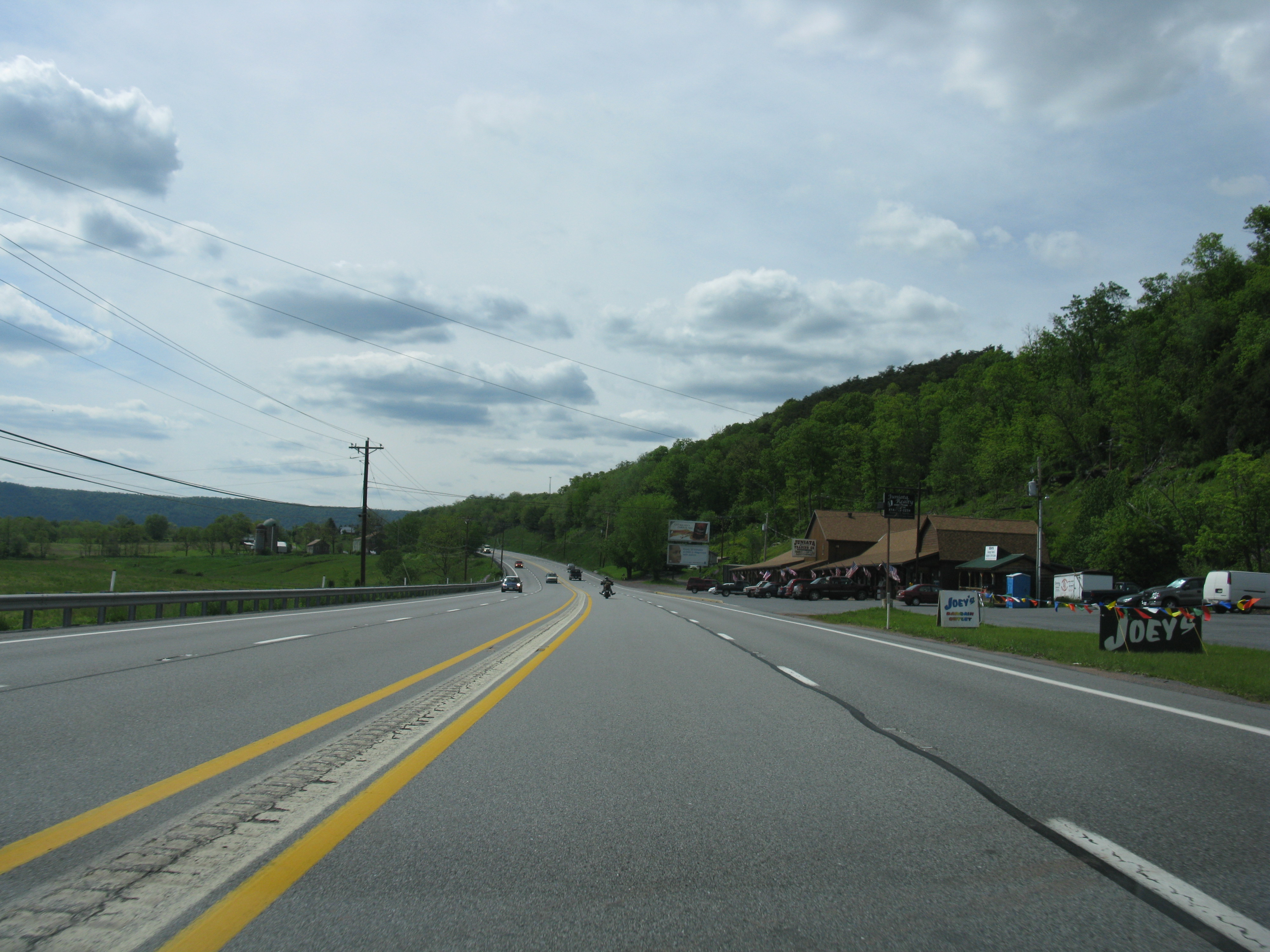
US 30 westbound in West Providence Township in Bedford County

At the summit of Laurel Hill, US 30 enters Somerset County and begins to descend the hill along the two-lane undivided Lincoln Highway, passing through a section of Laurel Ridge State Park where it crosses the Laurel Highlands Hiking Trail. After descending the hill, the road runs east-southeast. The route enters Jennerstown and becomes West Pitt Street. US 30 intersects PA 985 and becomes East Pitt Street.

The road leaves Jennerstown and becomes the Lincoln Highway again. The route heads through Jenners Crossroads before it has a junction with PA 601 in Ferrellton. US 30 briefly becomes a four-lane divided highway as it comes to an interchange with the US 219 freeway.

Past this interchange, the route becomes a two-lane, undivided road again and winds southeast. The road runs along the southwest border of Stoystown and passes under Somerset Street before it reaches an interchange with the northern terminus of PA 281.

Past Stoystown, US 30 crosses the Stonycreek River and intersects the southern terminus of PA 403 before it comes to a bridge over CSX Transportation's S&C Subdivision railroad line. The route comes to the entrance road to the Flight 93 National Memorial to the south. The road runs through Buckstown and passes north of Indian Lake before reaching an intersection with PA 160 in Reels Corner. US 30 continues east-southeast and passes to the north of the Stony Creek Wind Farm before it begins to ascend Allegheny Mountain, winding to the east. Approaching the summit of the mountain, the road comes to an eastbound truck brake check station.

US 30 leaves the Laurel Highlands region as it crosses into Bedford County and reaches the summit of Allegheny Mountain, where it turns north-northeast and begins to descend the mountain. The road makes a hairpin turn to the southeast, then winds east, coming to an eastbound truck brake-check station as it continues to descend. The route heads east-northeast and enters Schellsburg, where US 30 becomes Pitt Street and crosses PA 96.

Upon leaving Schellsburg, the road becomes the Lincoln Highway again and passes north of Shawnee State Park, curving southeast and then east. The route passes under the Pennsylvania Turnpike (I-70/I-76) before intersecting the eastern terminus of PA 31.

US 30 heads east-northeast a short distance to the south of the Pennsylvania Turnpike and reaches a junction with the eastern terminus of PA 56 before it curves southeast and crosses the Raystown Branch Juniata River in Wolfsburg. The route runs south and comes to an intersection with the western terminus of US 30 Bus., at which point US 30 becomes a four-lane freeway that bypasses Bedford to the north.

US 30 heads southeast and reaches a cloverleaf interchange with the US 220 freeway. The freeway crosses the Raystown Branch Juniata River and runs to the north of the river, passing over US 220 Bus. The route leaves Bedford and crosses the river again before it comes to a westbound exit and eastbound entrance with the eastern terminus of US 30 Bus., where the freeway section ends and US 30 becomes the four-lane divided Lincoln Highway.

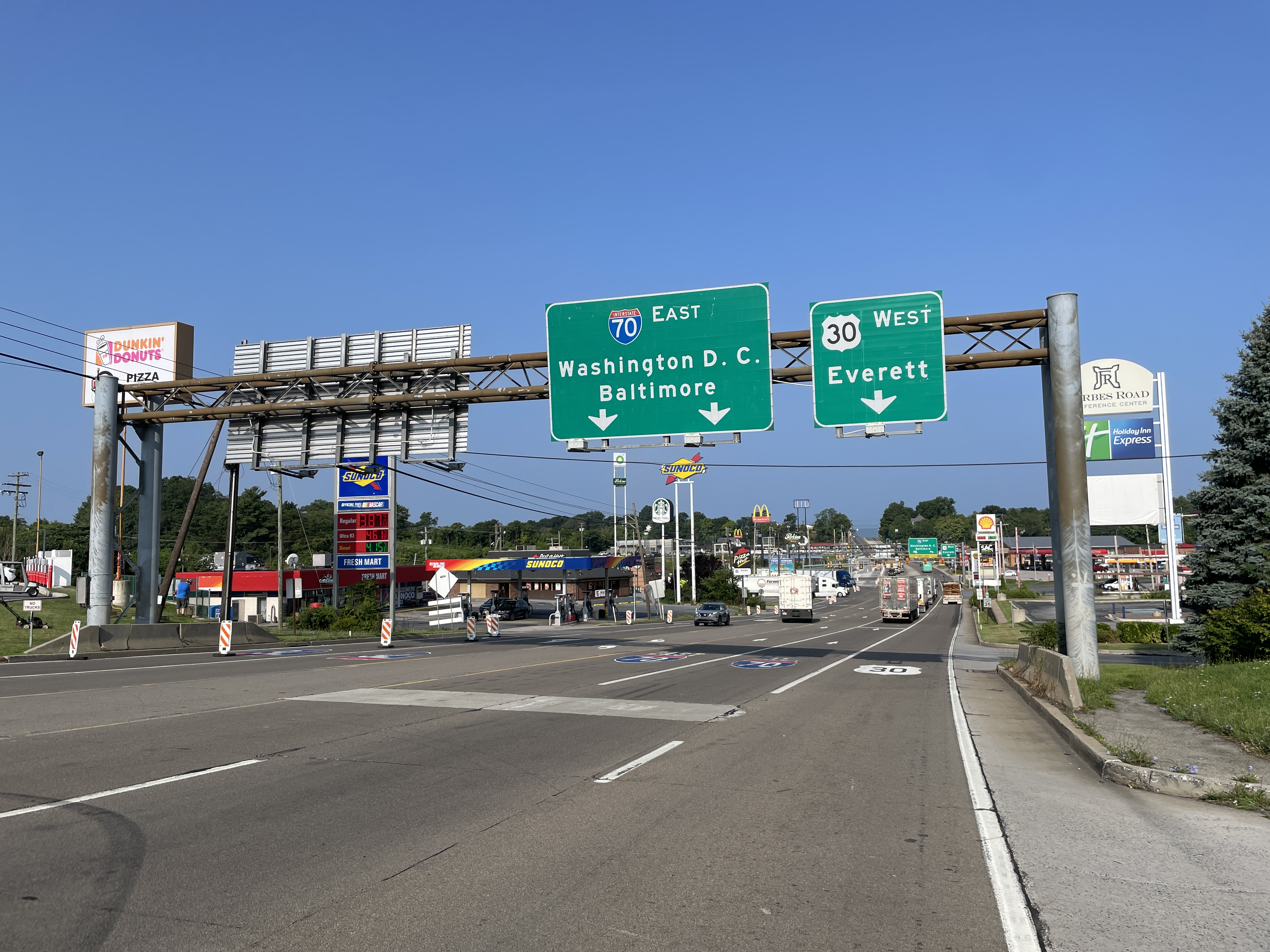
View east along the non-freeway portion of I-70 and west along US 30 in Breezewood

US 30, the Raystown Branch Juniata River, and the Pennsylvania Turnpike pass southeast through The Narrows, a gap in Evitts Mountain. Here, US 30 intersects the northern terminus of PA 326 and curves northeast, crossing over the river and under the turnpike. The route becomes a five-lane road with a center left-turn lane, curving east. The road becomes a four-lane divided highway with interchanges at Pennknoll Road, south of UPMC Bedford Hospital, and at Lutzville Road. US 30 continues east and southeast and passes east through a gap in Tussey Mountain. The route has an eastbound exit and westbound entrance with the western terminus of US 30 Bus., where it becomes a freeway that bypasses Everett to the north. The freeway turns north between the mountain to the west and Everett to the east before it turns east and passes over PA 26 before an interchange with the Bud Shuster Bypass that connects to PA 26. The freeway section of US 30 ends at an intersection with the eastern terminus of US 30 Bus. east of Everett, where US 30 becomes the four-lane divided Lincoln Highway. The road curves southeast as it runs north of the Raystown Branch Juniata River. The route crosses the river and winds east, heading into Breezewood, where it passes several businesses and comes to an at-grade intersection with I-70. At this point, I-70 joins US 30 in a wrong-way concurrency on a non-limited-access section of Interstate Highway that has two eastbound lanes, three westbound lanes, and a center left-turn lane before the road comes to an interchange with the Pennsylvania Turnpike, where I-70 splits from US 30 and heads west along with I-76 on the turnpike. From here, US 30 narrows to a two-lane undivided road and crosses the Abandoned Pennsylvania Turnpike before it heads northeast into rural areas and climbs Rays Hill, gaining a second eastbound lane and passing over the Pennsylvania Turnpike (I-76).

=== Breezewood to Lancaster ===
At the summit of Rays Hill, US 30 enters Fulton County and descends the hill as the two-lane, undivided Lincoln Highway, with the Pennsylvania Turnpike parallel to the north. The route turns east away from the turnpike and comes to an intersection with PA 915, at which point PA 915 heads east for a concurrency with US 30. The road heads into Buchanan State Forest, with PA 915 splitting to the north. US 30 ascends Sideling Hill and reaches the summit, where it comes to an eastbound truck brake check station. At this point, the road begins to descend Sideling Hill, winding east. During the descent, the roadway features two truck brake-check stations and two runaway-truck ramps in the eastbound direction. The route leaves the state forest and heads southeast, passing through the Saluvia. US 30 curves east-southeast and comes to an intersection with PA 655 in Harrisonville. The road turns southeast in Breezy Point and ascends Scrub Ridge. The route comes to a westbound truck brake check station before it reaches Summit, where it heads south to descend Scrub Ridge. US 30 continues south and briefly becomes a divided highway as it intersects Lincoln Way, where it turns into a two-lane expressway that bypasses McConnellsburg to the north. The road makes a hairpin turn to the northeast and gains a second westbound lane. The route curves east and comes to a diamond interchange with US 522 that serves McConnellsburg, where it becomes a four-lane divided expressway. Past this interchange, the expressway becomes a three-lane undivided road with two eastbound lanes and one westbound lane, turning to the south-southeast. US 30 becomes a divided highway and intersects Lincoln Way again, where the expressway section ends. The route becomes a three-lane undivided road with two eastbound lanes and one westbound lane as it ascends Tuscarora Mountain. The road narrows to two lanes as it continues to climb the mountain and follow a winding alignment.

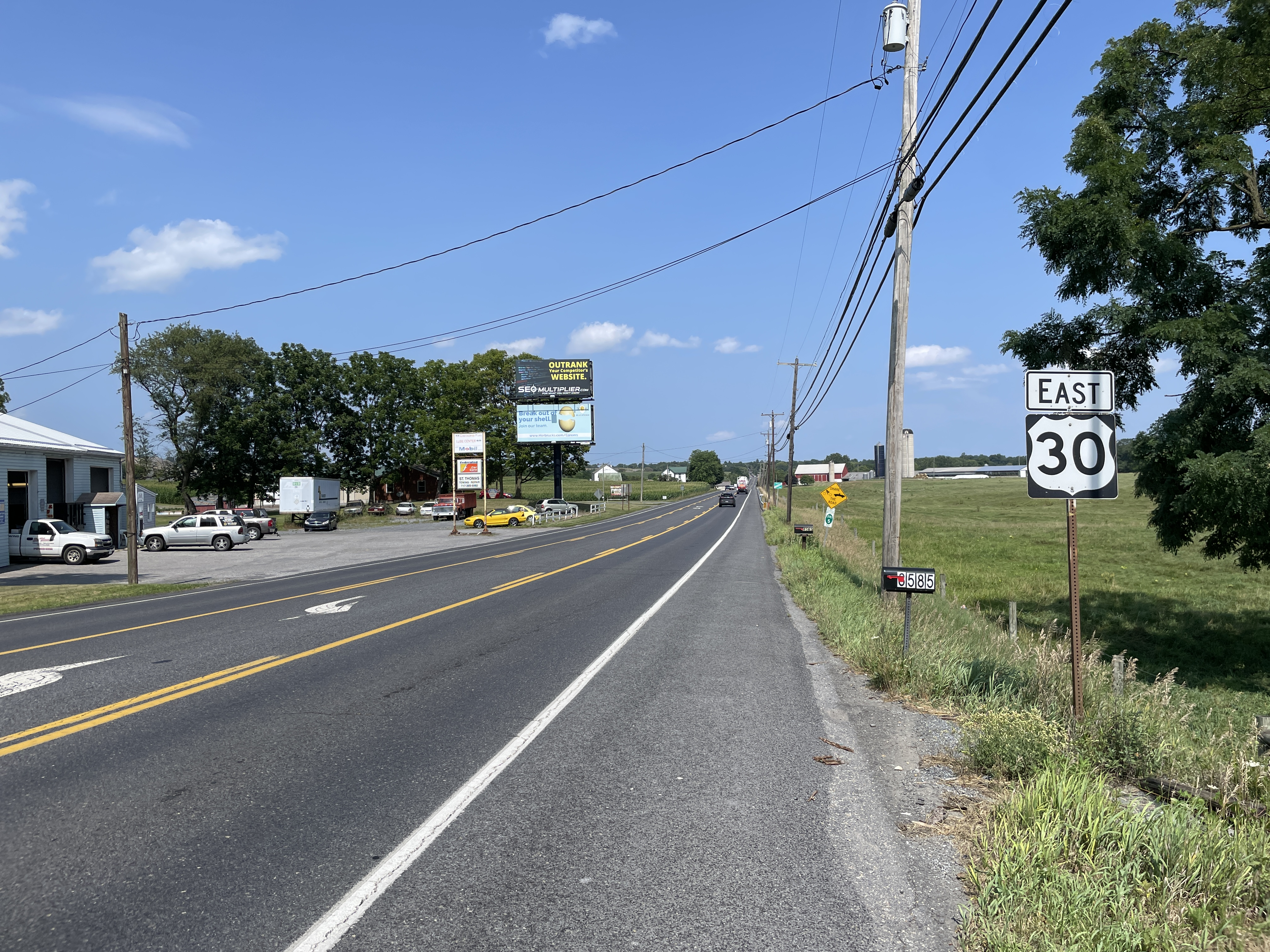
US 30 eastbound past PA 416 in St. Thomas Township

At the summit of Tuscarora Mountain, US 30 enters Franklin County and curves northeast to descend the mountain. The road comes to an eastbound truck brake-check station as it winds northeast, reaches an eastbound runaway-truck ramp, and gains a westbound truck lane. The route curves to the east-southeast and narrows to two lanes. At the bottom of the mountain, US 30 enters the Cumberland Valley and becomes Lincoln Way West, briefly turning into a divided highway as it reaches an intersection with PA 75. The road becomes undivided again and heads south of Fort Loudon. The route continues east-northeast through rural areas in the valley, intersecting the northern terminus of PA 416 and passing through St. Thomas Township. US 30 gains a center left-turn lane, crossing Back Creek. Farther east, the road has a junction with the northern terminus of PA 995 before it enters Chambersburg. At this point, the route runs through developed areas and splits into the one-way pair of West Loudon Street eastbound and Lincoln Way West westbound, with West Loudon Street a two-way two-lane road and Lincoln Way West carrying two lanes of one-way traffic. US 30 crosses the Conococheague Creek and the Chambersburg Rail-Trail, with the eastbound direction shifting to West Queen Street, which carries two lanes of one-way traffic. The route heads into downtown Chambersburg and intersects US 11, which is routed on the one-way pair of Main Street southbound and 2nd Street northbound. Westbound US 30 meets southbound US 11 at Memorial Square adjacent to the Franklin County Courthouse, which features a fountain in the middle of the intersection. Upon crossing southbound US 11, US 30 becomes East Queen Street eastbound and Lincoln Way East westbound, crossing under Norfolk Southern Railway's Lurgan Branch railroad line before both directions of US 30 rejoin on Lincoln Way East, a three-lane road with a center left-turn lane. The road runs east and passes south of WellSpan Chambersburg Hospital before it widens to five lanes as it comes to an interchange with I-81 on the eastern border of Chambersburg. Past this interchange, the route heads through Stoufferstown as a four-lane divided highway, soon becoming a five-lane road with a center left-turn lane. US 30 narrows to three lanes as it continues through a mix of rural areas and development, passing south of Fayetteville before it forms a short concurrency with PA 997 upon intersecting that route in Greenwood. The road leaves the Cumberland Valley as it heads into Michaux State Forest, where it crosses South Mountain. The route passes south of Caledonia State Park and becomes a three-lane road with two eastbound lanes and one westbound lane, crossing the Appalachian Trail. US 30 briefly becomes four lanes before it loses the second lane eastbound and intersects PA 233, where it turns into a three-lane road with a center left-turn lane.

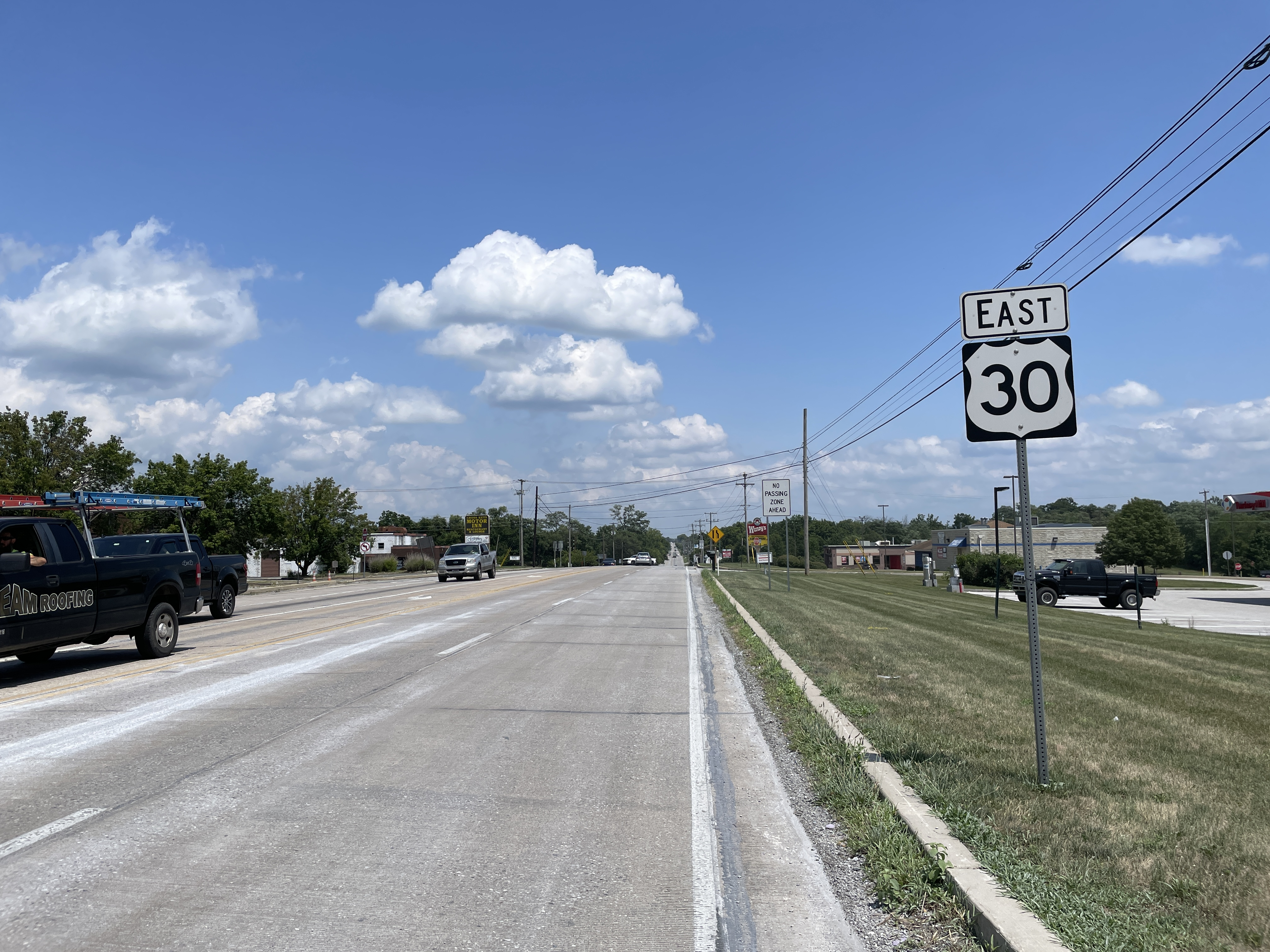
US 30 eastbound past PA 94 in Cross Keys

US 30 enters Adams County and becomes Chambersburg Road, continuing east through Cashtown Gap in South Mountain. The road becomes three lanes with two eastbound lanes and one westbound lane before it turns back to a three-lane road with a center left-turn lane. The route intersects the western terminus of PA 234. US 30 continues east with one eastbound lane and two westbound lanes before narrowing to a two-lane road. The route curves southeast in Hilltown and gains a center left-turn lane. The road passes through McKnightstown, where it narrows to two lanes. US 30 crosses CSX Transportation's Hanover Subdivision railroad line at-grade in Seven Stars. The route heads north of Gettysburg Regional Airport and passes through Stremmels before it runs through a section of Gettysburg National Military Park. US 30 enters Gettysburg and becomes Buford Avenue, passing north of United Lutheran Seminary as it heads into developed areas and turns east onto Chambersburg Street. The route continues into downtown Gettysburg and meets US 15 Bus./PA 116 at Lincoln Square, a traffic circle. At this point, US 30 heads east concurrent with PA 116 on York Street, with PA 116 splitting to the east and US 30 continuing northeast along York Street. The route leaves Gettysburg upon crossing Rock Creek. It becomes York Road, a three-lane road with a center left-turn lane, with CSX Transportation's Hanover Subdivision parallel to the northwest. The road turns into a four-lane divided highway as it comes to an interchange with the US 15 freeway. US 30 continues east-northeast as a three-lane road with a center left-turn lane through a mix of rural areas and development, passing through Guldens. The route curves east and briefly gains a second westbound lane before heading through Brush Run. The road narrows to two lanes and crosses the South Branch Conewago Creek, where the name changes to Lincoln Way West. US 30 enters New Oxford, crossing CSX Transportation's Hanover Subdivision at-grade and meeting Carlisle Street/Hanover Street at the New Oxford Town Square, a traffic circle. The route becomes Lincoln Way East before leaving New Oxford, where it turns into York Road and gains a center-left turn lane. The road crosses PA 94 in Cross Keys and gains a second westbound lane further east before it reaches Abbottstown. Upon entering Abbottstown, US 30 becomes two-lane West King Street, meeting PA 194 at the Abbottstown Square traffic circle, before it continues along East King Street.

Upon crossing Beaver Creek, US 30 leaves Abbottstown and heads into York County. The route follows Lincoln Highway, a three-lane road with a center left-turn lane. The road curves northeast, passes through Farmers, then bends east-northeast. US 30 heads north of York Airport before it reaches Thomasville, where it narrows to two lanes and crosses a York Railway line at-grade. The route gains a center left-turn lane and passes through more developed areas. The road widens to a four-lane divided highway and reaches an intersection with the eastern terminus of PA 116. US 30 heads east-northeast as West Market Street, a five-lane road with a center left-turn lane, and turns into a four-lane divided highway as it comes to a junction with the northern terminus of PA 616. Past this intersection, US 30 splits from West Market Street at a trumpet interchange by heading north onto a four-lane freeway, with PA 462 continuing east along West Market Street towards York. The freeway passes over a York Railway line and curves northeast, passing under PA 234. The route continues northeast and comes to a diamond interchange with PA 74 in a business area north of West York, with the West Manchester Town Center shopping center located northwest of the interchange. US 30 widens to six lanes before the freeway section ends, with US 30 becoming a six-lane divided highway with at-grade intersections called Loucks Road that passes development. The road enters York and curves east. The route leaves the York and crosses Susquehanna Trail/11th Avenue, where the name changes to Arsenal Road, before it reaches an intersection with I-83 Bus. and the southern terminus of PA 181 north of North York. US 30 comes to a partial cloverleaf interchange with I-83, where it narrows to four lanes, before it passes over Codorus Creek and the York County Heritage Rail Trail and then Norfolk Southern Railway's York Secondary railroad line. The route continues east, turning into an unnamed four-lane freeway and reaching an interchange with Memory Lane that serves East York. The freeway reaches a partial cloverleaf interchange with PA 24 south of the York Galleria shopping mall. US 30 continues east-northeast and passes north of the Haines Shoe House as it heads into rural areas, coming to a diamond interchange with Kreutz Creek Road that provides access to PA 462 and Hallam to the south. The freeway reaches a diamond interchange at Cool Springs Road, which heads south to connect to PA 462 and Wrightsville.

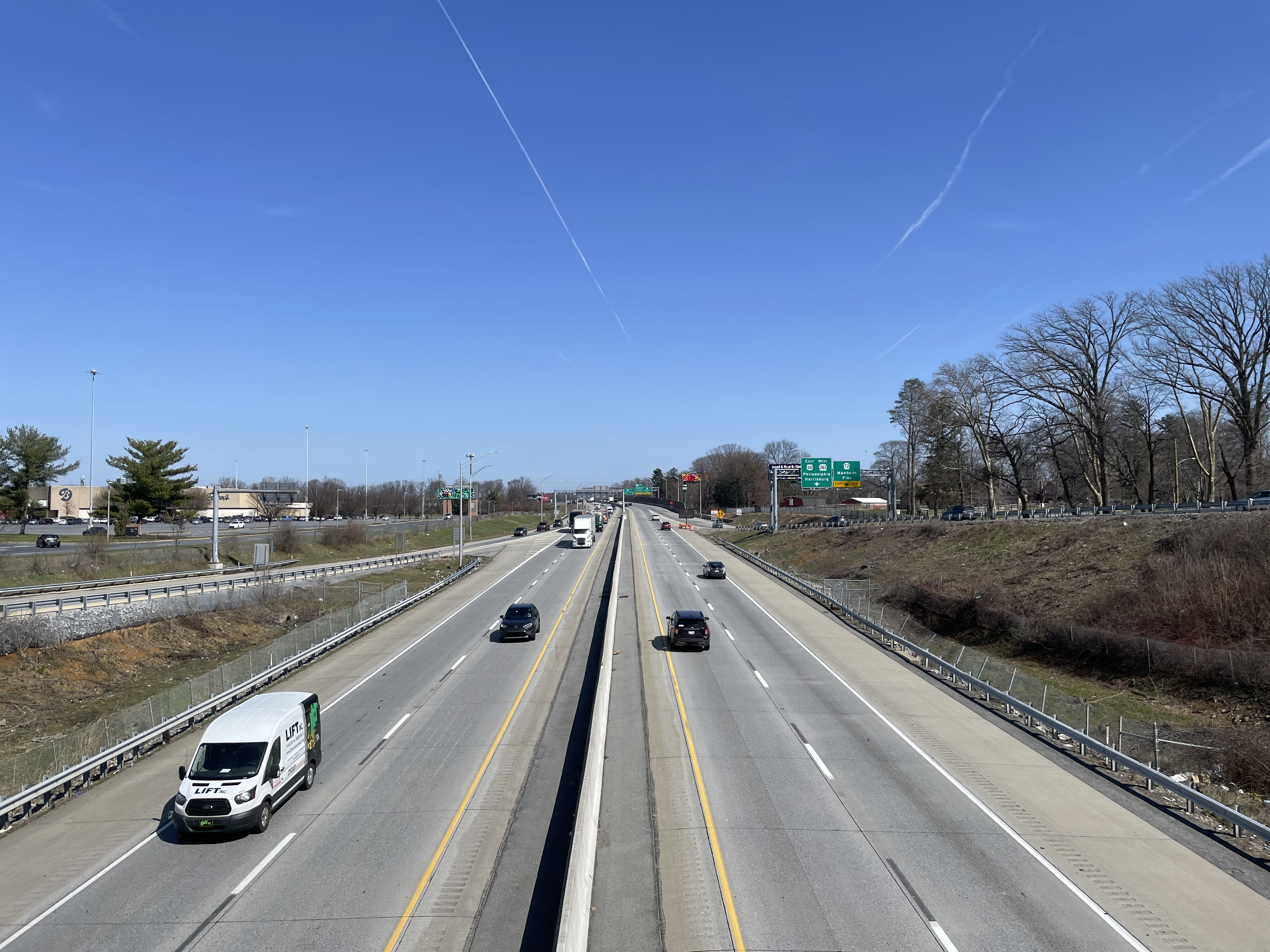
US 30 eastbound at the Harrisburg Pike interchange in Lancaster

US 30 crosses the Susquehanna River on the Wright's Ferry Bridge into Lancaster County, where it heads into Columbia and passes over Norfolk Southern Railway's Port Road Branch railroad line and the Northwest Lancaster County River Trail before coming to an interchange with PA 441 that serves Columbia; the Turkey Hill Experience is located south of this interchange. From here, the freeway heads northeast, then curves southeast. The route leaves Columbia and turns east, coming to a diamond interchange with Prospect Road. US 30 passes through Mountville before it reaches a diamond interchange with Stony Battery Road that serves Mountville. The freeway runs east-northeast through suburban development, coming to a partial cloverleaf interchange with Centerville Road. The route turns northeast and crosses under PA 23. US 30 curves east as it reaches a diamond interchange with PA 741. The freeway widens to six lanes before it curves northeast and crosses the Little Conestoga Creek. The route reaches an interchange with Harrisburg Pike. At this point, it enters Lancaster. It narrows to four lanes, with an auxiliary lane in each direction, passing southeast of the Park City Center shopping mall, which is served by the Harrisburg Pike interchange. US 30 leaves Lancaster as it passes over Amtrak's Keystone Corridor and Norfolk Southern Railway's Lititz Secondary railroad lines, reaching an eastbound exit and westbound entrance with PA 72. The route comes to an interchange with the eastern terminus of the PA 283 freeway. At this point, the US 30 freeway widens to six lanes and turns east as it becomes paralleled by a pair of frontage roads called Chester Road eastbound and York Road westbound. The frontage roads serve the interchanges at PA 672 (Fruitville Pike), PA 501, and US 222/PA 272 to the north of Lancaster. Past the US 222/PA 272 interchange, the frontage roads end and US 222 heads east concurrent with US 30 on the freeway before US 222 splits northeast on a freeway at a trumpet interchange. From here, US 30 continues southeast as a four-lane freeway with an auxiliary lane in each direction, coming to a diamond interchange with PA 23 at New Holland Pike. At this point, PA 23 joins US 30 in a wrong-way concurrency, with the freeway crossing the Conestoga River before PA 23 splits to the southwest at a partial cloverleaf interchange. US 30 runs through a section of Lancaster before it meets Greenfield Road at a partial cloverleaf interchange; Greenfield Road provides access to the Discover Lancaster Visitors Center. The freeway curves to the south-southeast, passing over Norfolk Southern Railway's New Holland Secondary and Amtrak's Keystone Corridor railroad lines before coming to a partial interchange with PA 340 that has no westbound exit. US 30 continues as a four-lane freeway with an eastbound auxiliary lane before the freeway section ends at an interchange with the eastern terminus of PA 462 to the east of Lancaster.

=== Lancaster to New Jersey ===
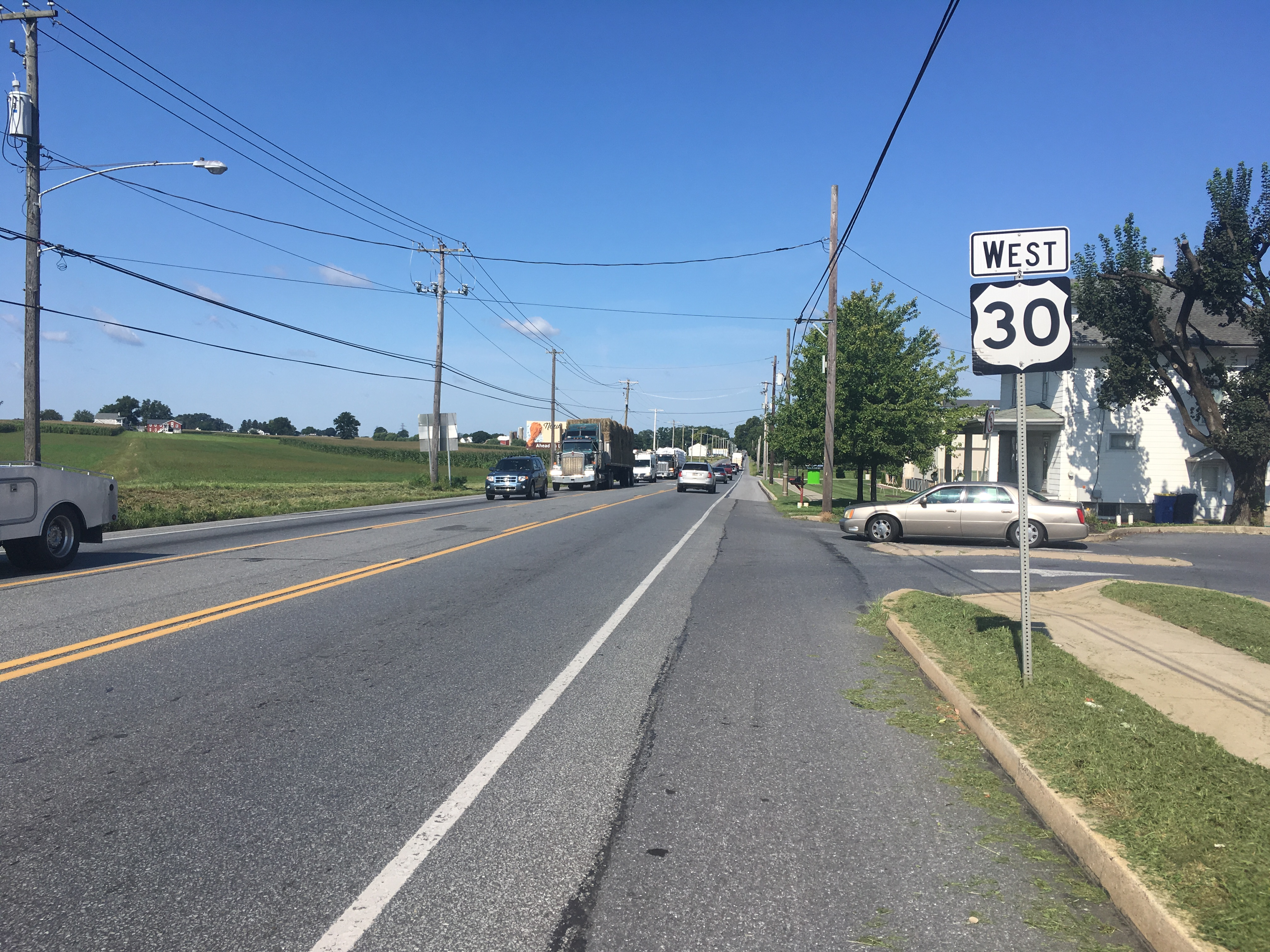
US 30 westbound in East Lampeter Township to the east of Lancaster

Past the interchange with the eastern terminus of PA 462, US 30 heads east-southeast along Lincoln Highway, a five-lane road with a center left-turn lane, passing through Greenland. The route heads into the Pennsylvania Dutch Country of eastern Lancaster County and is lined with many Amish tourist attractions. The road crosses Mill Creek and heads north of the Tanger Outlets Lancaster outlet mall and south of the Dutch Wonderland amusement park. US 30 passes south of the Willow Hill Covered Bridge and American Music Theatre and runs between two shopping centers before it reaches an intersection with PA 896. Past this intersection, the route narrows to a three-lane road with a center left-turn lane and heads through agricultural areas with some development, passing through Soudersburg. US 30 crosses the Pequea Creek and runs through Paradise before it comes to a bridge over Amtrak's Keystone Corridor railroad line. From here, the route continues east-southeast a short distance to the north of the Amtrak line. The road closely parallels the railroad tracks as it heads through Kinzers. The Amtrak line diverges to the southeast of here. The route splits into a one-way pair, with two lanes in each direction, as it reaches Gap and comes to an intersection with the eastern terminus of PA 772. US 30 continues along the one-way pair, with both directions rejoining at a junction with the northern terminus of PA 41. Past the PA 41 junction, the route is a four-lane divided highway that soon turns into a three-lane road with a center left-turn lane, intersecting the southern terminus of PA 897. The road leaves Gap and becomes a three-lane road, with two eastbound lanes and one westbound lane, as it ascends a hill. Farther east, the route becomes three lanes with a center left-turn lane.

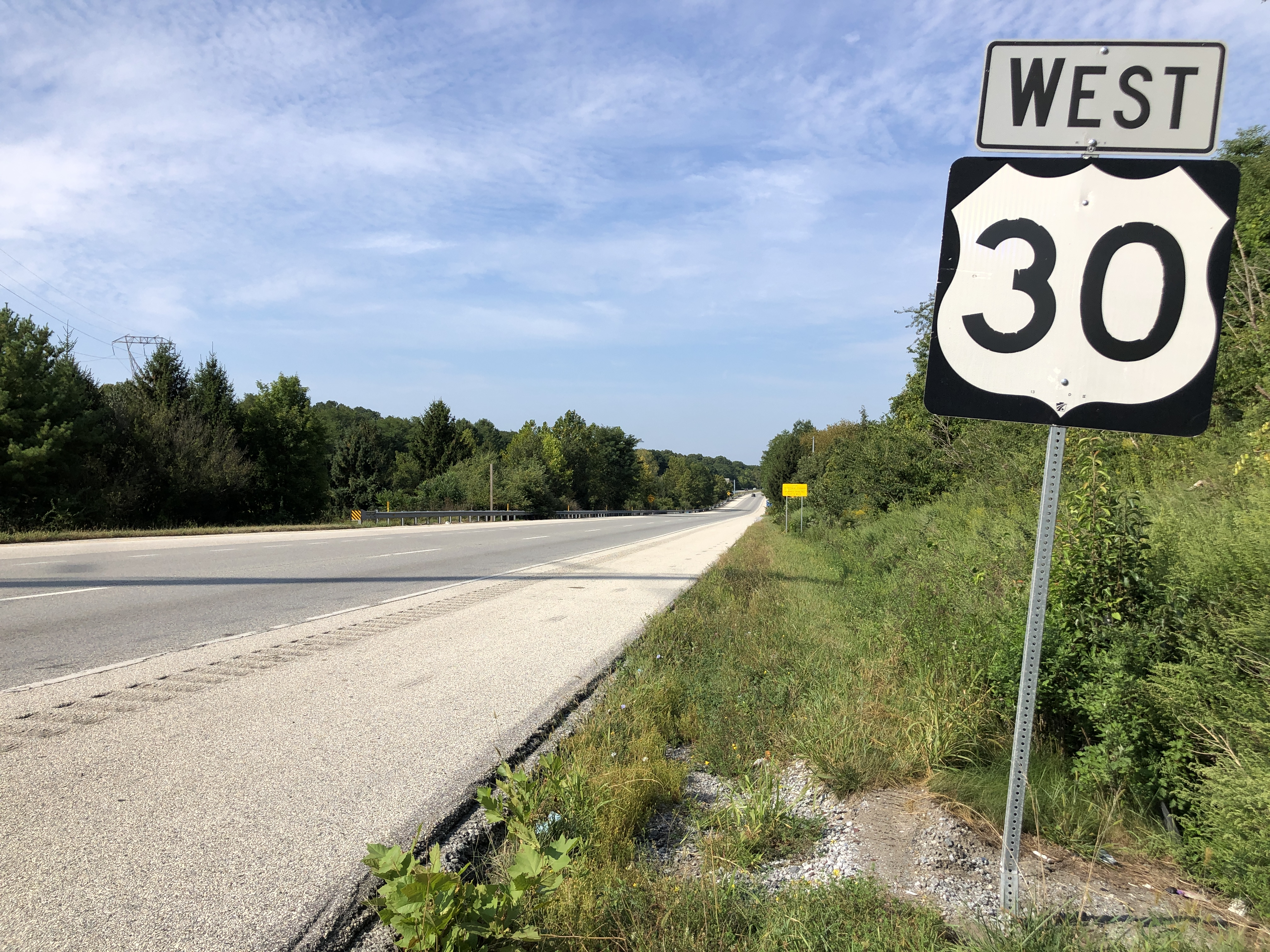
US 30 freeway westbound on the Exton Bypass past US 202 and US 30 Bus. in Frazer

US 30 enters Chester County and continues east along the Lincoln Highway, passing through Black Horse. The route turns into a four-lane undivided road and comes to an intersection with PA 10 north of Parkesburg, where it becomes a divided highway. US 30 splits from the Lincoln Highway at an eastbound exit and westbound entrance by heading onto a four-lane freeway known as the Coatesville–Downingtown Bypass, with US 30 Bus. continuing east along the Lincoln Highway. The freeway heads east, crossing Buck Run and coming to a westbound exit and eastbound entrance with Airport Road that provides access to Chester County G. O. Carlson Airport. Following this, the route runs east-northeast through a mix of rural areas and suburban development. US 30 heads into Coatesville and crosses the West Branch Brandywine Creek before it comes to a partial cloverleaf interchange with PA 82 that provides access to Coatesville. Past this interchange, the freeway leaves Coatesville and passes under PA 340 before reaching an interchange with Reeceville Road. The route curves east-southeast and crosses under PA 340 again, then runs east as it enters the Great Valley and comes to a diamond interchange with PA 340 north of Thorndale. US 30 heads east-northeast and reaches a partial cloverleaf interchange with US 322 that serves Downingtown. Farther east, the freeway passes over PA 282 and the East Branch Brandywine Creek before it comes to a bridge over the Struble Trail and enters a section of Downingtown, reaching a westbound exit and eastbound entrance with Norwood Road that provides access to PA 282. The route widens to six lanes and heads near suburban development before it comes to an eastbound exit and westbound entrance with PA 113, at which point it leaves Downingtown and narrows back to four lanes. US 30 curves southeast and crosses over the Lincoln Highway (US 30 Bus.) and reaches an interchange with the route. After this interchange, the freeway is named the Exton Bypass. The route turns northeast and runs parallel to Amtrak's Keystone Corridor railroad line to the south of the road. US 30 comes to a partial cloverleaf interchange with PA 100 that serves Exton to the north and runs south to provide a connection to US 202 south. Following this, the freeway continues east-northeast parallel to the Amtrak line. US 30 comes to an interchange with the US 202 freeway and the eastern terminus of US 30 Bus., at which point the freeway section ends. The Exton Bypass portion of US 30 is designated the Exton Bypass Scenic Byway, a Pennsylvania Scenic Byway.

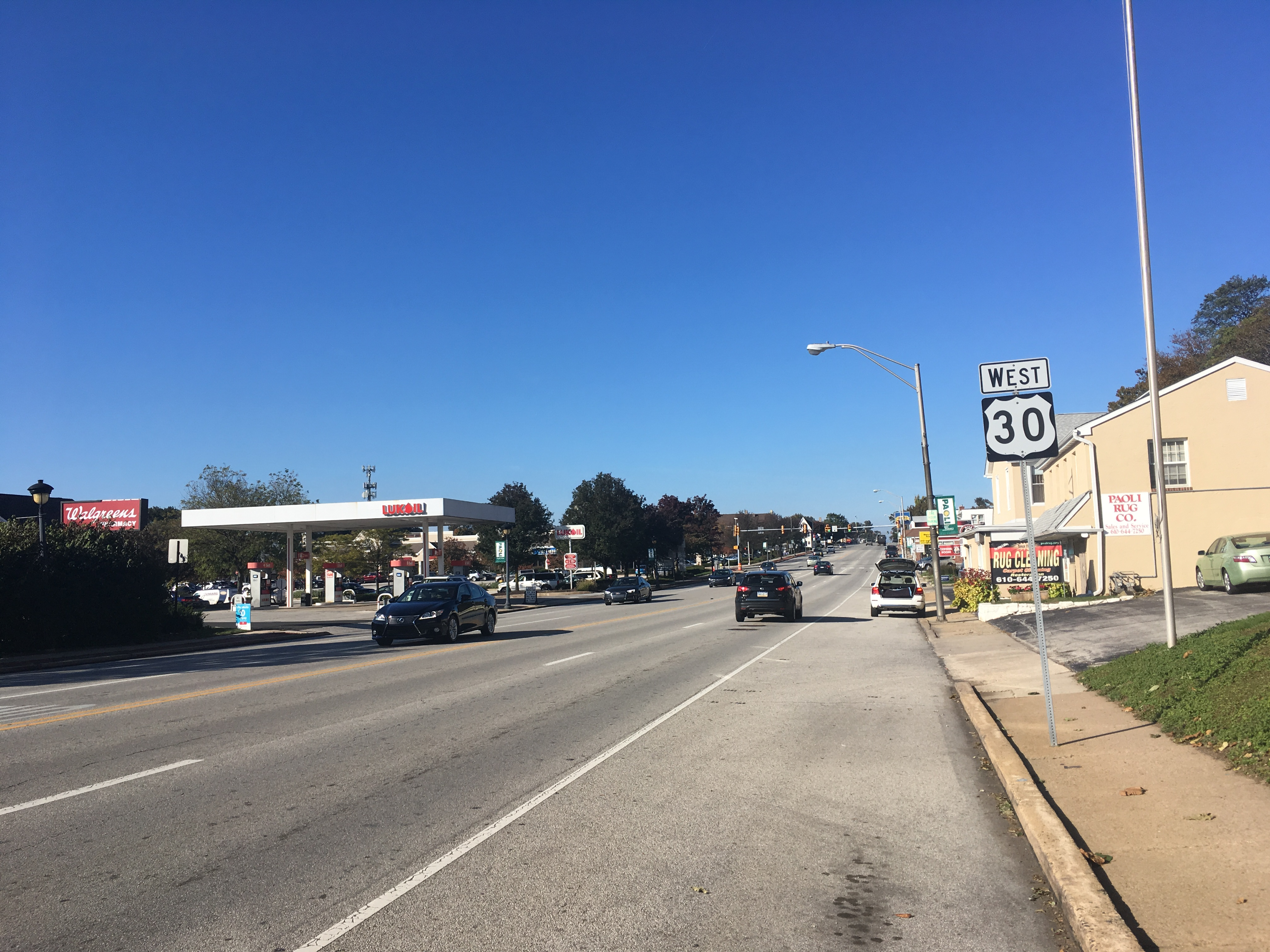
US 30 westbound past PA 252 in Paoli

Past the interchange with US 202 and US 30 Bus., US 30 heads east-northeast along the four-lane divided Lincoln Highway and passes south of a park-and-ride lot, running through Glenloch. The route soon becomes Lancaster Avenue, a three-lane road with a center left-turn lane. In Frazer, the road comes to an intersection with the northern terminus of PA 352. Farther east, US 30 widens to five lanes with a center turn lane before it reaches a junction with the eastern terminus of PA 401. The route turns into a four-lane divided highway before intersecting the southern terminus of PA 29. Past this intersection, the road crosses under Norfolk Southern Railway's Dale Secondary railroad line. It continues east as it exits the Great Valley and runs north of Malvern, becoming undivided. US 30 briefly gains a center left-turn lane before it becomes a divided highway again as it passes south of Paoli Hospital before crossing under Amtrak's Keystone Corridor railroad line to the north of Green Tree. At this point, the route enters the Philadelphia Main Line suburbs as it heads into Paoli, where it becomes a four-lane undivided road. In the center of Paoli, the road has a junction with Paoli Pike before it passes south of the Paoli station serving Amtrak's Keystone Corridor and SEPTA's Paoli/Thorndale Line. US 30 gains a center left-turn lane and reaches an intersection with PA 252. Following this intersection, the route runs south of the parallel Amtrak line, passing south of Daylesford station in Daylesford. The road loses the center turn lane and runs farther south, still parallel to the railroad tracks, before turning northeast. US 30 reaches Berwyn, where it passes south of Berwyn station and curves east and then southeast, gaining a center left-turn lane. The route turns to the northeast and reaches Devon, where it drops the center turn lane and runs south of Devon station before passing to the north of the Devon Horse Show grounds. Past Devon, the road bends to the east-southeast.

Upon intersecting Old Eagle School Road/Sugartown Road, US 30 enters Delaware County and continues east-southeast along four-lane undivided Lancaster Avenue, curving east and running through the downtown area of Wayne. The route passes through St. Davids and turns southeast. East of here, the road becomes a divided highway before turning undivided again. US 30 briefly becomes a divided highway again as it curves east and reaches an interchange with I-476. Past this interchange, the route turns back into an undivided road and crosses under SEPTA's Norristown High Speed Line before coming to an intersection with PA 320 in Villanova. Following this intersection, the road runs through the Villanova University campus, passing south of St. Thomas of Villanova Church, and curves southeast before the Ithan Avenue intersection, where it heads to the south of Villanova Stadium and the Finneran Pavilion arena. After passing through the university campus, US 30 runs through Rosemont. Upon intersecting County Line Road, the route enters Montgomery County and heads into Bryn Mawr, passing through the downtown area. The road continues southeast, briefly reenters Delaware County, then heads back into Montgomery County. US 30 passes through Haverford, where it heads north of the Haverford School. The route continues into Ardmore. It runs through the downtown area, passing south of the Ardmore station serving Amtrak's Keystone Corridor and SEPTA's Paoli/Thorndale Line. Past Ardmore, the road heads through Wynnewood. The route runs southeast before it crosses the East Branch Indian Creek and passes between the St. Charles Borromeo Seminary to the northeast and Lankenau Medical Center to the southwest as a five-lane road with a center left-turn lane before reaching an intersection with US 1 (City Avenue).

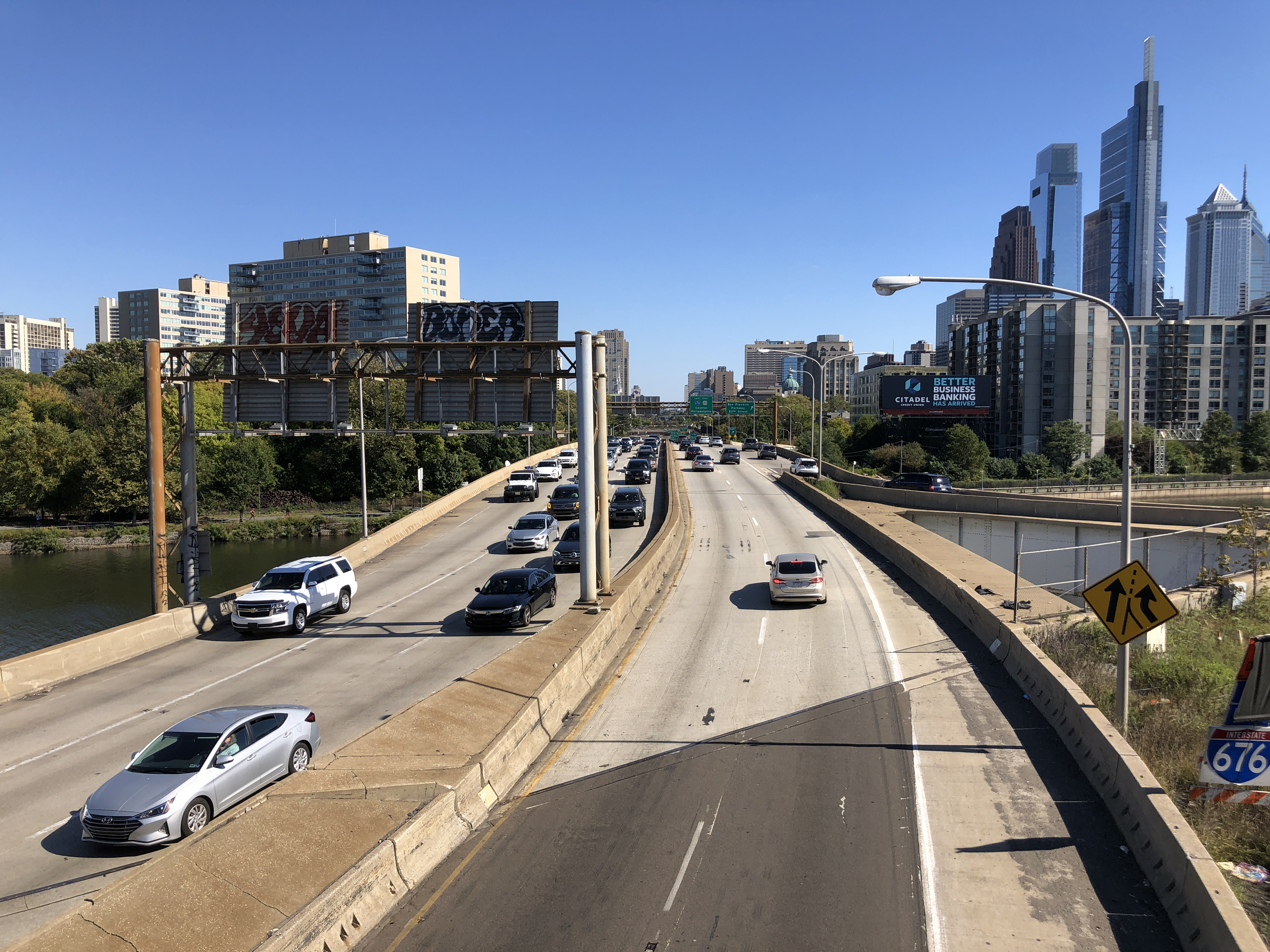
I-676/US 30 (Vine Street Expressway) eastbound crossing the Schuylkill River and entering Center City Philadelphia

Upon crossing US 1, US 30 enters Philadelphia and continues southeast along two-lane undivided Lancaster Avenue through the Overbrook neighborhood. At the intersection with 62nd Street/Malvern Avenue, the route passes north of 63rd Street and Malvern Avenue station that serves as the terminus of SEPTA's Route 10 trolley line and heads into urban areas of West Philadelphia a short distance to the south of Amtrak's Keystone Corridor railroad line, running north of Overbrook High School after the 59th Street intersection. Farther southeast, a SEPTA trolley track follows the westbound lanes past the 54th Street junction. At the intersection with 52nd Street/Lansdowne Avenue, US 30 heads further south from the Amtrak tracks, and SEPTA's Route 10 trolley line begins following the road. The route splits from Lancaster Avenue by turning east onto Girard Avenue, which carries two lanes of traffic and SEPTA's Route 15 trolley line. The road runs east, crosses Amtrak's Keystone Corridor at the Belmont Avenue intersection, then widens to four lanes. Farther east, US 30 passes over CSX Transportation's Harrisburg Subdivision railroad line before it comes to an interchange with I-76 (Schuylkill Expressway) and US 13 to the north of the Philadelphia Zoo, crossing under Pennsylvania Railroad, Connecting Railway Bridge carrying Amtrak's Northeast Corridor railroad line at this interchange. At this interchange, US 13 heads south along 34th Street and continues east (north) along the Girard Avenue Bridge over the Schuylkill River while US 30 becomes concurrent with I-76 on the six-lane Schuylkill Expressway at this point and the road heads south, with the Philadelphia Zoo to the west and Martin Luther King Jr. Drive, a trail, and the Schuylkill River parallel to the east. The freeway turns southeast and runs between Amtrak's Northeast Corridor to the southwest and the river drive, trail, and river to the northeast, with Boathouse Row on the opposite bank of the river. The Schuylkill Expressway comes to an eastbound exit and westbound entrance with Spring Garden Street, which heads east across the Schuylkill River toward the Philadelphia Museum of Art. The freeway continues south, heading east of Amtrak's Penn Coach Yard, and comes to an interchange with the western terminus of I-676.

At this point, US 30 heads east concurrent with I-676 on the six-lane Vine Street Expressway. It immediately crosses the Schuylkill River and then the Schuylkill River Trail and CSX Transportation's Philadelphia Subdivision railroad line on the river's east bank on the Vine Street Expressway Bridge before coming to an interchange with 23rd and 22nd streets and Benjamin Franklin Parkway that has access to the PMA and the Franklin Institute science museum. From this point, the Vine Street Expressway enters a depressed road cut and passes under several streets and two freeway lids, running along the northern edge of Center City, Philadelphia. Vine Street serves as a street-level frontage road to the freeway. Within this alignment, there is an exit for PA 611 (Broad Street). After passing under 10th Street in Chinatown, the last street the depressed alignment passes under, the highway rises and reaches a split between the Vine Street Expressway, which continues to I-95, and I-676/US 30. At this split, there is also an eastbound exit and westbound entrance for 8th Street. After exiting the Vine Street Expressway, eastbound I-676/US 30 has a brief at-grade portion along southbound 6th Street east of Franklin Square to the Benjamin Franklin Bridge approach, an example of a non-limited-access section of Interstate Highway. Westbound I-676/US 30 has a ramp from the bridge to the Vine Street Expressway that intersects 7th Street and 8th Street at-grade. From this point, I-676/US 30 crosses over I-95, Christopher Columbus Boulevard, and then the Delaware River into New Jersey on the seven-lane Benjamin Franklin Bridge, which also carries pedestrians and the PATCO Speedline. This bridge and its approaches are maintained by the Delaware River Port Authority.

== History ==
Lincoln Highway
- Location: Greene Township–Morrisville
- Existed: 1913–1928

Pennsylvania Route 1
- Location: Greene Township–Morrisville
- Existed: 1924–1928

The path of the Lincoln Highway was first laid out in September 1913; it was defined to run through Canton, Ohio; Beaver, Pittsburgh, Greensburg, Ligonier, Bedford, Chambersburg, Gettysburg, York, Lancaster, and Philadelphia, Pennsylvania; and Camden, New Jersey. This routing bypassed Harrisburg to the south and thus did not use the older main route across the state between Chambersburg and Lancaster. From Pittsburgh to Philadelphia, this incorporated several old turnpikes, some of which still collected tolls:

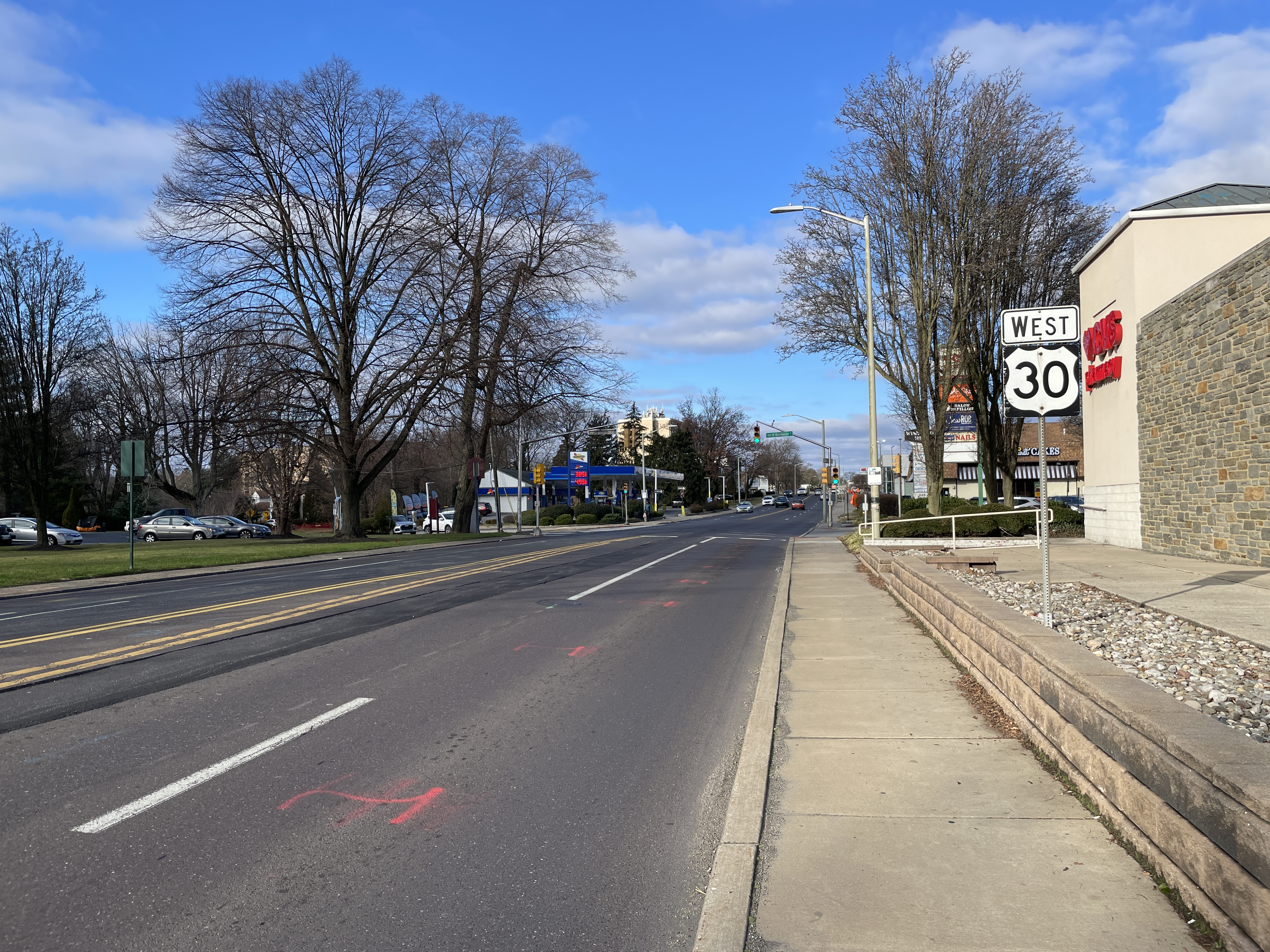
US 30 westbound in Wynnewood

- Part of the Harrisburg and Pittsburgh Turnpike, chartered in 1806, broken up in 1814 into separate turnpike companies, of which the following were included:
  - Greensburg and Pittsburgh Turnpike, Pittsburgh to Greensburg
  - Somerset and Greensburg Turnpike (renamed the Stoystown and Greensburg Turnpike in 1815), Greensburg to Stoystown
  - Bedford and Somerset Turnpike (renamed the Bedford and Stoystown Turnpike in 1815), Stoystown to Bedford
  - Chambersburg and Bedford Turnpike, Bedford to Chambersburg
- Chambersburg Turnpike, Chambersburg to Cashtown
- Part of the Gettysburg and Petersburg Turnpike, from Cashtown to Gettysburg
- York and Gettysburg Turnpike, Gettysburg to York
- Wrightsville Turnpike, York to Wrightsville
- Columbia–Wrightsville Bridge, Wrightsville to Columbia
- Lancaster and Susquehanna Turnpike, Columbia to Lancaster
- Philadelphia and Lancaster Turnpike, Lancaster to Philadelphia

This original 1913 path of the Lincoln Highway continued east from Philadelphia, crossing the Delaware River to Camden, New Jersey, on the Market Street Ferry. Philadelphia marked the route from the ferry landing west on Market Street through downtown and onto Lancaster Avenue to the Philadelphia and Lancaster Turnpike in early 1914. Camden was dropped from the route, allowing the highway to cross the Delaware River on a bridge at Trenton, New Jersey (initially the Calhoun Street Bridge, later the Lower Trenton Bridge).

In 1924, the entire Lincoln Highway in Pennsylvania was designated Pennsylvania Route 1 (PA 1). In late 1926, the route from West Virginia to Philadelphia (using the new route west of Pittsburgh) was assigned US 30, while the rest of the Lincoln Highway and PA 1 became part of US 1. The PA 1 designation was gone by 1929, but several branches from east to west—PA 101, PA 201, PA 301, PA 401, PA 501, and PA 601—had been assigned by then. (PA 701 was assigned later as a branch of PA 101.)

=== Ohio to Downtown Pittsburgh ===
As defined in 1913, the Lincoln Highway ran east-northeast from Canton, Ohio, to Alliance and east via Salem, crossing into Pennsylvania just east of East Palestine. From there, it continued southeasterly to Beaver, crossing the Beaver River there and heading south along its left bank to Rochester and the Ohio River's right bank to Pittsburgh.

By 1915, the highway had been realigned to the route it would follow until the end of 1927. It ran east from Canton to Lisbon, Ohio, and then southeast to East Liverpool on the Ohio River. After crossing into Pennsylvania, it turned north away from the river at Smiths Ferry, taking an inland route to Beaver, where it rejoined the Ohio River. It crossed the Beaver River into Rochester, joining the 1913 alignment, and turned south with the Ohio to Pittsburgh.

==== 1915 route ====
This route entered Pennsylvania along PA 68. After crossing Little Beaver Creek, it turned south on Main Street, passing under the Cleveland and Pittsburgh Railroad (Pennsylvania Railroad) into Glasgow. After passing through Glasgow on Liberty Street, the highway turned north and passed under the railroad again at Smiths Ferry, merging with Smiths Ferry Road. This alignment through Glasgow carried the Lincoln Highway until c. 1926, when the present PA 68 was built on the north side of the railroad.

The Lincoln Highway left the banks of the Ohio River on Smiths Ferry Road, which includes an old stone bridge over Upper Dry Run. It turned east on Tuscarawas Road through Ohioville, entering Beaver on Fourth Street and turning south on Buffalo Street to reach Third Street (PA 68). By 1929, this inland Glasgow–Beaver route was numbered PA 168, while the route along the river, never followed by the Lincoln Highway, was PA 68.

Where PA 68 crosses the Pittsburgh and Lake Erie Railroad from Beaver into Bridgewater along Third Street and then the Beaver River on the c. 1963 Rochester–Bridgewater Bridge, the Lincoln Highway instead ran along Bridge Street, just to the north, and crossed the Old Rochester–Bridgewater Bridge into Rochester.

Continuing through Rochester to Pittsburgh, the Lincoln Highway left the Old Rochester–Bridgewater Bridge on Madison Street, turning onto Brighton Avenue, and then crossing the Pittsburgh, Fort Wayne and Chicago Railway (Pennsylvania Railroad) on New York Avenue. After running alongside the Ohio River on Railroad Avenue, the highway crossed the railroad again in Freedom (about a block north of Third Street), running through Freedom on Third Avenue.

South of downtown Freedom, Third Avenue merges into the Ohio River Boulevard, also known as PA 65, which runs along the old Lincoln Highway into Conway. There, the old highway went onto First Avenue and State Street, rejoining PA 65 in Baden. Further into Baden, the old highway left PA 65 again, onto State Street, becoming Duss Avenue in Harmony Township. At the Ambridge limits, this becomes PA 989, but the old highway turned west at 14th Street and then south on Merchant Street.

Crossing Big Sewickley Creek from Ambridge, Beaver County into Leetsdale, Allegheny County, Merchant Street becomes Beaver Street, a brick road. Beaver Road and Beaver Street continues through Edgeworth, Sewickley, and Osborne, merging back into PA 65 at the border with Haysville. Sewickley officially changed the name of its piece to the Lincoln Highway by an ordinance in January 1916, and Osborne, Edgeworth, and Leetsdale soon followed suit, but that name is no longer used.

In Glenfield, the highway crossed the Pittsburgh, Fort Wayne and Chicago Railway twice, once near the present overpass and again west of Toms Run Road. The old road next to the Ohio River, Beaver Street, is still a yellow brick road but now used only by local traffic.

The old road left PA 65 again in Emsworth as Beaver Road, becoming Brighton Road in Ben Avon before remerging with PA 65. It splits yet again, also in Ben Avon, onto Brighton Road, another yellow brick road. In Avalon, it is California Avenue, and, in Bellevue, it is Lincoln Avenue, coincidentally named after Abraham Lincoln soon after the U.S. Civil War.

The highway crosses into Pittsburgh on a high concrete arch bridge over Jack's Run, built in 1924 to replace an earlier bridge built for a streetcar line, and returns to the California Avenue name. It crosses Woods Run on a similar 1928 bridge next to a newer bridge built for the Ohio River Boulevard (PA 65). Where California Avenue curves away from PA 65, the Lincoln Highway continued next to it on Chateau Street, turning east on Western Avenue and then south on Galveston Avenue onto the 1915 Manchester Bridge to Point State Park.

While the Lincoln Highway ran through Rochester, the Rochester–Pittsburgh segment was locally maintained. It was often foggy, and a July 1926 Lincoln Highway Association (LHA) road report states that it was "paved city streets, mostly poor", in stark contrast to the good paving east of Pittsburgh. By 1924, reports recommended following an alternate on the other side of the river between Rochester and Pittsburgh. The route west of Rochester had similar problems; it was a dirt road as of 1911, despite being a state highway, though improved by 1930. By 1922 an official detour was recommended via East Palestine, Ohio, and Beaver, largely identical to the initial 1913 plan.

==== 1927 route ====
Work began in the mid-1920s on a new route to the south of the existing route, passing through West Virginia and bypassing the problematic sections on both sides of Rochester; the Lincoln Highway was moved to it December 2, 1927. This new route had already been numbered US 30 in late 1926.

The new Lincoln Highway bypassed Imperial on a bypass built for it. Just southeast of Imperial, the highway turned east on PA 60 (Steubenville Pike), joining what was US 22 before the present US 22/US 30 freeway was built c. 1964. Steubenville Pike runs along the north side of the freeway, crossing to the south side and then merging with it just west of the I-376 interchange. From the late 1940s to 1982, the appropriately-named Penn-Lincoln Drive-In Theater operated on a stretch of the original Lincoln Highway in North Fayette, just east of Imperial. It reopened for one season in 1985 as the Super 30 West Drive-In. The site is now occupied by Penn-Lincoln Shopping Center.

US 22 and US 30 now join I-376 and turn southeast, but the Lincoln Highway (and US 22/US 30 before the nearby part of what is now I-376 opened in 1953) continued east with PA 60 through Robinson Township. In Pittsburgh, the highway ran along Crafton Boulevard, Noblestown Road, and South Main Street, as PA 60 still does. It turned onto Carson Street (now PA 837) at the West End Circle, crossing the 1927 Point Bridge into the Point.

=== Downtown Pittsburgh to North Huntingdon ===
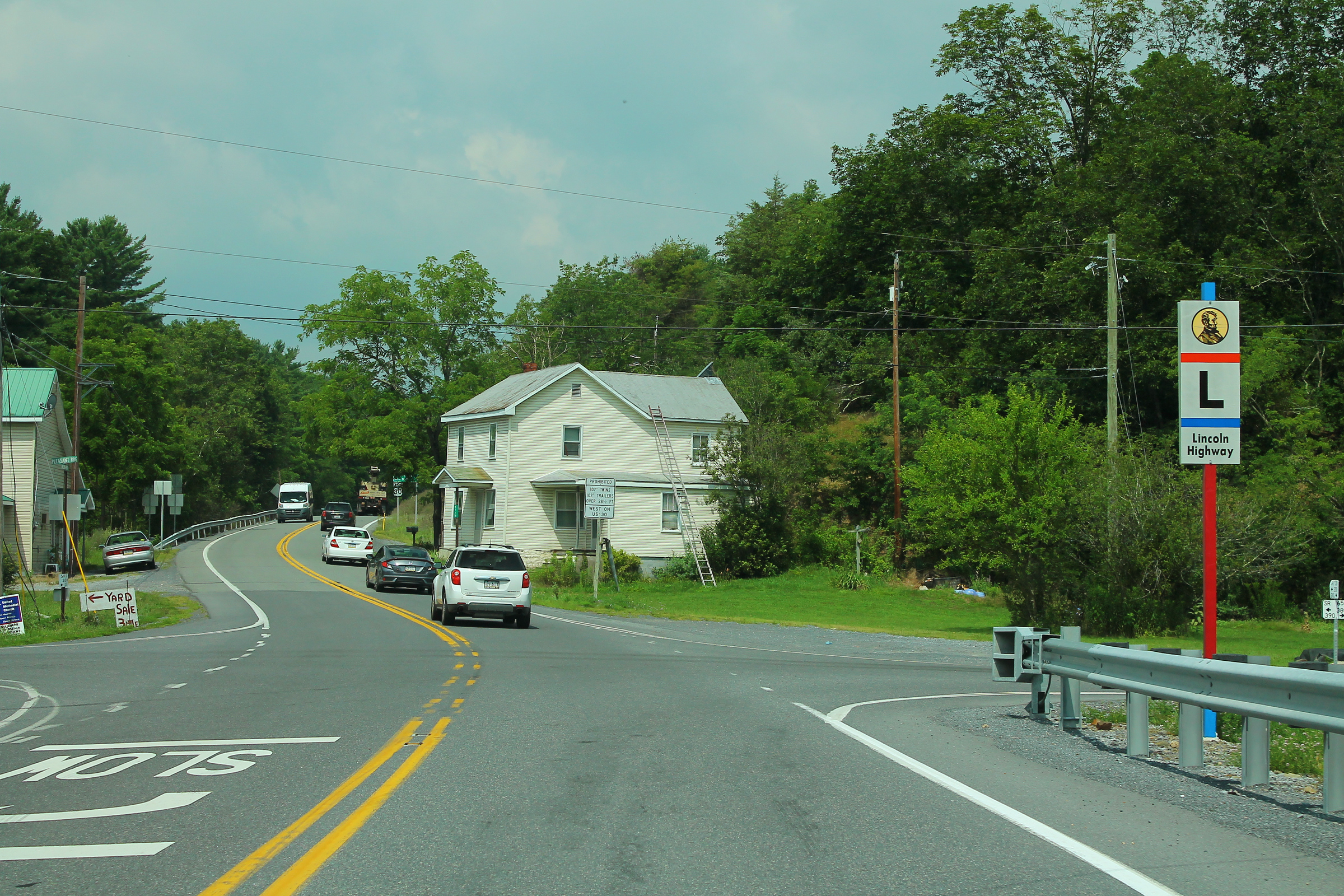
Marker for Lincoln Highway along US 30 westbound at PA 655 in Licking Creek Township

From 1915 to late 1927, the Lincoln Highway crossed the Allegheny River on the Manchester Bridge to the Point, touching down at the foot of Penn Avenue after meeting the Point Bridge. It made its way through downtown to Bigelow Boulevard (now PA 380), using Water Street, Liberty Avenue, and Oliver Avenue. It continued to follow present PA 380 onto Craig Street and Baum Boulevard to East Liberty. The highway left East Liberty and Pittsburgh on Penn Avenue, the old Pittsburgh and Greensburg Turnpike, also now part of PA 380, and further east part of PA 8. (PA 380, however, bypasses the center of East Liberty.)

The Boulevard of the Allies opened east of downtown Pittsburgh in 1923 and, in 1924, was designated as an alternate route. By 1930, this bypass ran along the Boulevard of the Allies, Forbes Avenue, Beeler Street, Wilkins Avenue, and Dallas Avenue, rejoining the Lincoln Highway at Penn Avenue, west of Wilkinsburg.

Leaving the Pittsburgh area, the Lincoln Highway turned onto Ardmore Boulevard (now signed as PA 8 north of I-376, and US 30 south of I-376). It then branched away from Ardmore Boulevard along Electric Avenue, turned northeast on Braddock Avenue, and then east on Penn Avenue. The Lincoln Highway originally continued onto Airbrake Avenue and then turned south at 11th Street to cross Turtle Creek and the Pennsylvania Railroad main line over a bridge; a 1925 replacement bridge starts at the intersection of Airbrake Avenue, Penn Avenue, Monroeville Avenue, and Greensburg Pike. The Lincoln Highway then followed Greensburg Pike up to current US 30.

In 1932, a bypass of the grades into and out of Turtle Creek, including the George Westinghouse Bridge, was opened. It runs along current US 30 from the interchange with Electric Avenue in Chalfant to the intersection with Greensburg Pike in North Versailles Township.

White Oak named their main street Lincoln Way in an attempt to convince the LHA to use it, but instead the highway continued along Greensburg Pike through North Versailles Township.

=== Later history ===
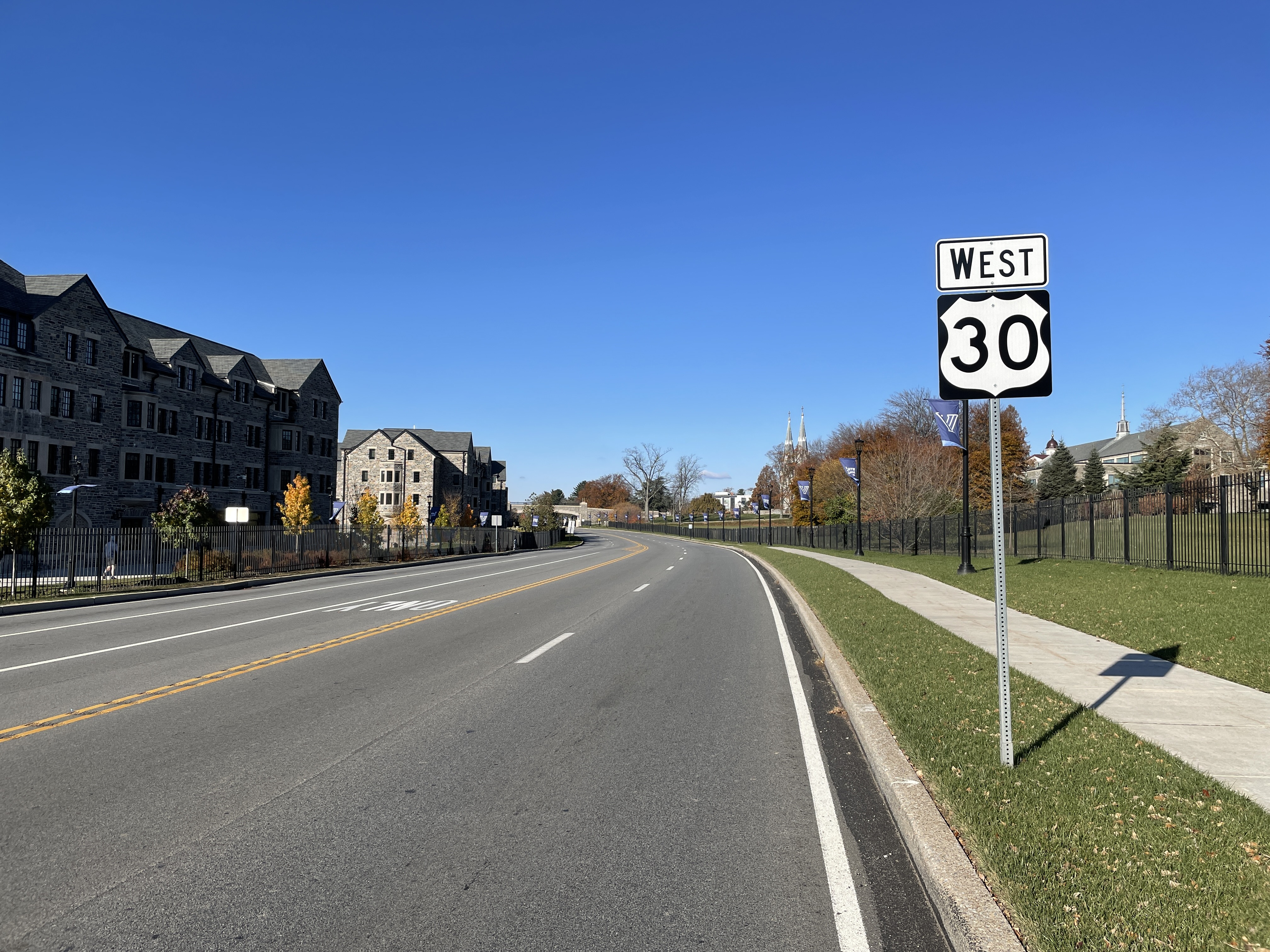
US 30 westbound passing through the Villanova University campus in Villanova

The Penn-Lincoln Parkway was built from 1953 to 1962 as a freeway bypass across the Pittsburgh area for both the Lincoln Highway (US 30) and the William Penn Highway (US 22).

In 1953, the portion of present-day US 30 between PA 283 in Lancaster and PA 462 east of Lancaster was built as a freeway alignment of US 230. In 1967, US 30 was shifted to a freeway bypass between Prospect Road east of Columbia and east of Lancaster; the route replaced the US 230 designation between the present-day PA 283 and PA 462 interchanges. PA 462 was designated onto the former alignment of US 30 between those two points. In 1972, US 30 was shifted to a bypass between west of York and Columbia, with PA 462 extended west along the former alignment of US 30.

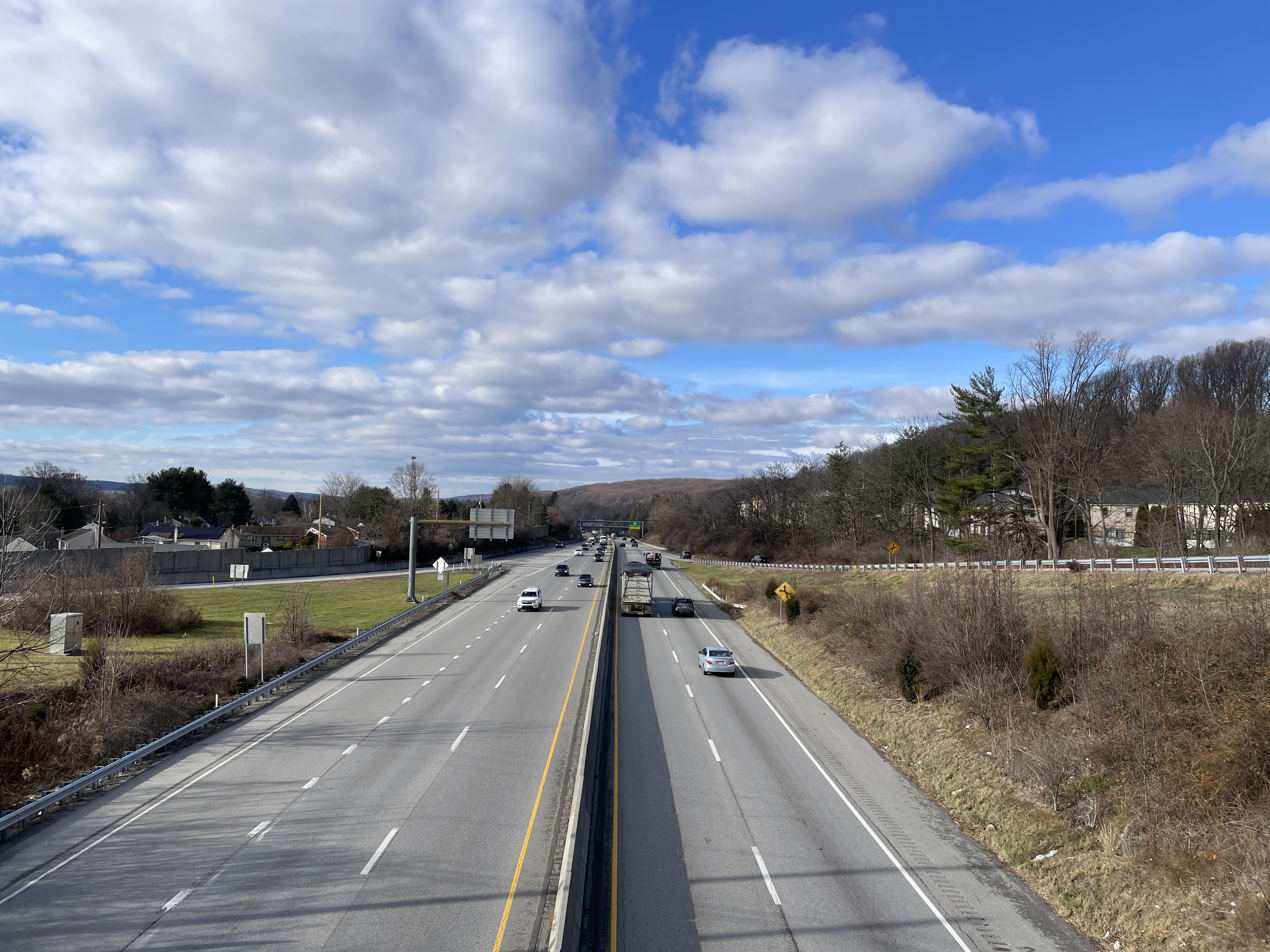
US 30 freeway westbound at the PA 113 interchange near Downingtown

In 1963, the Coatesville Downingtown Bypass, a freeway bypass route of US 30, was completed. The bypass begins east of the intersection with PA 10 and terminates east of Downingtown in East Caln Township. Upon completion of the bypass, US 30 Bus. was designated onto the former alignment of US 30. Shortly after the completion of the bypass, plans were made to extend the new bypass further east to the US 202 interchange with US 30. However, due to significant delays caused by environmental concerns and funding issues, construction did not begin until 1993. The Exton Bypass was completed in December 1995 and was connected to the existing Coatesville Downingtown Bypass, allowing for a continuous freeway alignment of US 30 from PA 10 to US 202. US 30 Bus. was also extended east through Exton along the former alignment of US 30 to its current eastern terminus following the completion of the bypass. The Exton Bypass also provided significant relief to the Exton area, as the intersection of the former US 30 alignment (now US 30 Bus.) and PA 100 was the source of major congestion throughout the area.

From 1997 to 2004, significant construction was completed on the US 30 bypass around Lancaster.

A bypass of the section of US 30 in Gap, in Lancaster County, was first proposed in February 2012. In 2015, a Pennsylvania Department of Transportation project began to build a bypass to the north of Gap for westbound US 30 between the PA 772 and PA 41 intersections to improve traffic flow and safety at the congested intersection of US 30 and PA 41. The bypass, which cost $10 million (equivalent to $13.1 million in 2025), was opened on August 4, 2016.

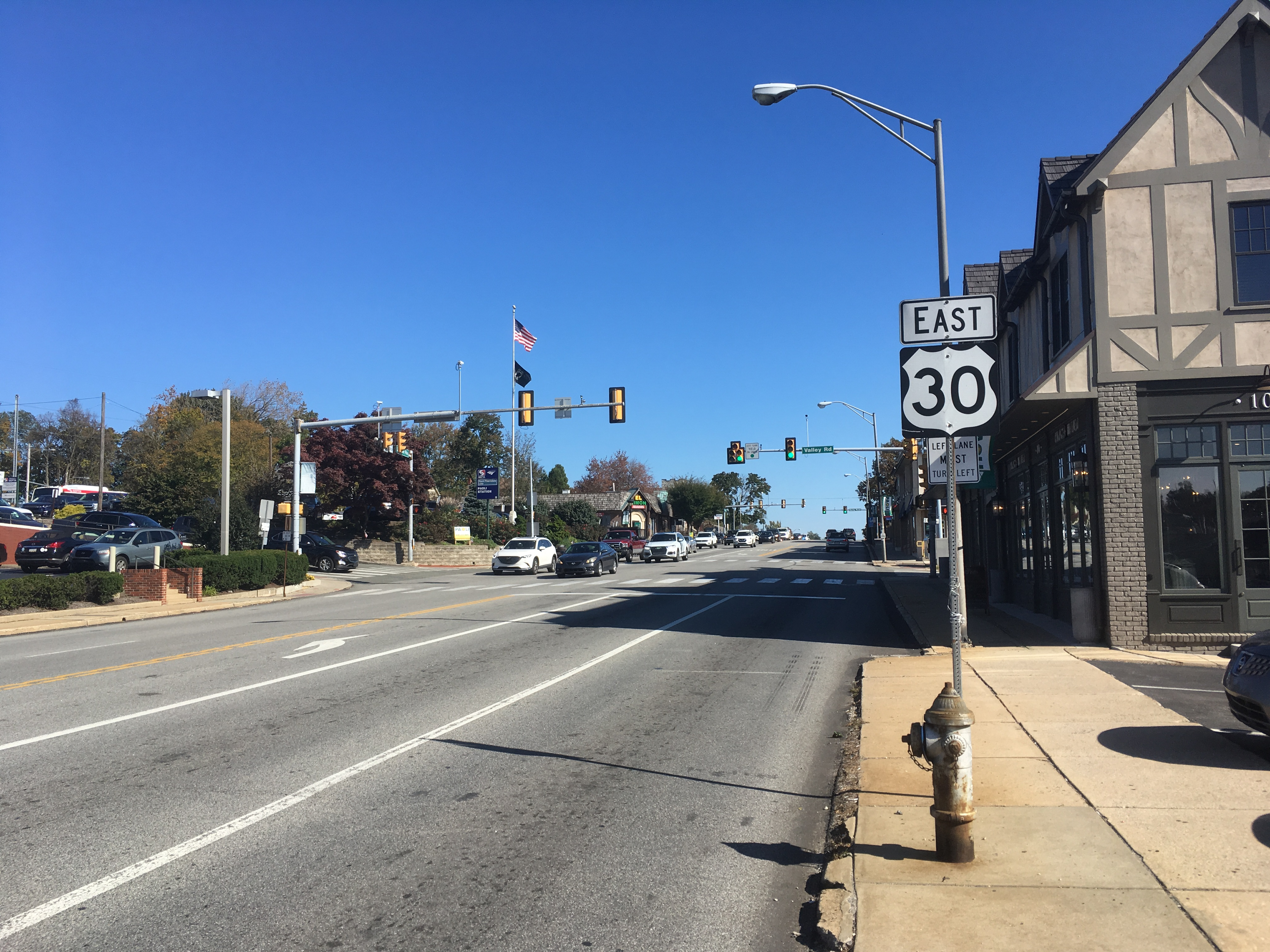
US 30 eastbound in Paoli

On April 7, 2018, a section of US 30 in East Pittsburgh sank 40 feet (12 m) down a hill after a landslide. One apartment building was destroyed, and another was threatened and ultimately demolished. The damaged road section reopened in late June 2018.

There are plans to improve the US 30 freeway, bypassing Coatesville and Downingtown in Chester County. The project is split into a western section between PA 10 near Parkesburg and PA 82 in Coatesville and an eastern section between Reeceville Road near Coatesville and US 30 Business east of Downingtown. The western section will remain four lanes wide, with construction planned to begin in 2026. The eastern section is planned to be widened to six lanes, with construction beginning as early as 2028. In addition to improvements made to the freeway, interchanges will also be improved. Construction of the western section is projected to cost $355 million while the eastern section is projected to cost $460 million.

== Major intersections ==
County	Location	mi	km	Exit	Destinations	Notes
Beaver	Greene Township	0.000	0.000		US 30 west (Lincoln Highway) – East Liverpool	Continuation into West Virginia
Beaver	Greene Township	2.328	3.747		PA 168 – Hookstown, Washington	
Beaver	Greene Township	4.883	7.858		PA 151 east (Bocktown Road)	Western terminus of PA 151
Beaver	Hanover Township	7.733	12.445		PA 18 (Frankfort Road) – Frankfort Springs, Monaca	
Allegheny	Findlay Township	17.530– 17.643	28.212– 28.394		PA Turnpike 576 (Southern Beltway) – Pittsburgh International Airport	Exit 2 on PA 576
Allegheny	North Fayette Township	20.981	33.766	Western end of freeway section		
Allegheny	North Fayette Township	20.981	33.766		US 22 west (William Penn Highway) / PA 978 south (Bateman Road) – Weirton, Imperial	Western end of US 22 concurrency; northern terminus of PA 978
Allegheny	North Fayette Township	22.486	36.188		Hankey Farms	Access via Oakdale Road
Allegheny	North Fayette Township	23.475	37.779		Orange Belt – Oakdale	Westbound exit and eastbound entrance; western end of Orange Belt concurrency; access via McKee Road
Allegheny	North Fayette Township	24.491	39.414		Old Steubenville Pike / Bayer Road / Montour Church Road	
Allegheny	Robinson Township	24.937	40.132	60	I-376 west / Orange Belt / PA 60 south – Airport, Crafton	Signed as exits 60A (west) and 60B (south); eastern end of Orange Belt concurrency; western end of I-376 concurrency; exit number not signed eastbound
Allegheny	Robinson Township	25.831	41.571	61	Ridge Road	
Allegheny	Robinson–Collier township line	26.966	43.398	62	Yellow Belt (Campbells Run Road)	Westbound exit and eastbound entrance
Allegheny	Robinson Township	28.235– 29.144	45.440– 46.903	64A	I-79 – Washington, Erie	Exit 59 on I-79
Allegheny	Rosslyn Farms	29.448	47.392	64B	Rosslyn Farms	Westbound exit and eastbound entrance; access via Rosslyn Road
Allegheny	Carnegie	29.882	48.090		Buses only (West Busway)	Eastbound exit and westbound entrance
Allegheny	Carnegie	30.290	48.747	65	PA 50 – Carnegie, Heidelberg	
Allegheny	Green Tree	32.192	51.808	67	PA 121 / Blue Belt – Green Tree, Mount Lebanon, Crafton	
Allegheny	Pittsburgh	32.666	52.571	68	Parkway Center Drive	Westbound exit and eastbound entrance
Allegheny	Pittsburgh	33.339	53.654	69A	US 19 south (Banksville Road) – Mt. Lebanon, Uniontown	Westbound exit and eastbound entrance; western end of US 19 concurrency
Allegheny	Pittsburgh	33.775	54.356	69B	US 19 Truck south / PA 51 south – Uniontown	Eastbound exit and westbound entrance; western end of US 19 Truck concurrency
Allegheny	Pittsburgh	33.850	54.476	69C	US 19 north / PA 51 north – West End	Eastbound exit and westbound entrance; eastern end of US 19 concurrency
Allegheny	Pittsburgh	33.920– 34.611	54.589– 55.701	Fort Pitt Tunnel under Mount Washington		
Allegheny	Pittsburgh	34.675	55.804	69C	PA 837 north to PA 51 – West End	Westbound exit and eastbound left entrance
Allegheny	Pittsburgh	34.611– 34.840	55.701– 56.070	Fort Pitt Bridge over the Monongahela River		
Allegheny	Pittsburgh	34.840– 34.996	56.070– 56.321	70A	Boulevard of the Allies / Liberty Avenue – PPG Arena	Eastbound left exit and westbound entrance
Allegheny	Pittsburgh	34.840– 34.996	56.070– 56.321	70B	Fort Duquesne Boulevard – Convention Center, Strip District	Eastbound left exit and westbound entrance
Allegheny	Pittsburgh	34.840– 34.996	56.070– 56.321	70C	I-279 north (US 19 Truck north) – Fort Duquesne Bridge, North Shore	Left exit eastbound; eastern end of concurrency with US 19 Truck, southern terminus of I-279
Allegheny	Pittsburgh	35.075	56.448	70D	Stanwix Street	No eastbound exit; left exit and entrance westbound; left entrance eastbound
Allegheny	Pittsburgh	35.475	57.091	71A	Grant Street	Left exit and entrance
Allegheny	Pittsburgh	36.003	57.941	71B	Second Avenue	Westbound exit only
Allegheny	Pittsburgh	36.929	59.431	72A	Forbes Avenue – Oakland	Eastbound exit and westbound entrance
Allegheny	Pittsburgh	37.055	59.634	72B	Boulevard of the Allies (PA 885 north) to I-579 north – Liberty Bridge	No eastbound exit; left entrance eastbound
Allegheny	Pittsburgh	37.709	60.687	73	PA 885 (Bates Street) – Glenwood, Oakland	Westbound exit and eastbound entrance; signed as Exits 73A (south) and 73B (north)
Allegheny	Pittsburgh	39.338	63.308	74	Blue Belt – Squirrel Hill, Homestead	
Allegheny	Pittsburgh	39.585– 40.589	63.706– 65.322	Squirrel Hill Tunnel under Squirrel Hill		
Allegheny	Pittsburgh–Swissvale– Edgewood tripoint	41.521	66.822	77	Edgewood, Swissvale	Access via Braddock Avenue
Allegheny	Wilkinsburg	42.887	69.020		I-376 east / US 22 east – Monroeville	Eastern end of I-376/US 22 concurrency; exit 78A on I-376
Allegheny	Wilkinsburg	42.887	69.020		PA 8 north – Wilkinsburg	Exit 78B on I-376; southern terminus of PA 8
Allegheny	Wilkinsburg	42.887	69.020	Eastern end of freeway section		
Allegheny	North Braddock–Chalfant line	45.265	72.847		East Pittsburgh, Turtle Creek	Interchange; eastbound exit and westbound entrance; access via Electric Avenue
Allegheny	North Versailles Township	47.713	76.787		Greensburg Pike	Interchange
Allegheny	East McKeesport	48.053	77.334		PA 148 south / Yellow Belt (5th Avenue)	Northern terminus of PA 148
Allegheny	North Versailles Township	49.987	80.446		PA 48 / Orange Belt (Mosside Boulevard / Jacks Run Road) – Monroeville, McKeesport, White Oak	
Westmoreland	North Huntingdon Township	54.947	88.429		Main Street	Eastbound exit and entrance
Westmoreland	North Huntingdon Township	56.850	91.491		I-76 Toll / Penna Turnpike	Exit 67 (Irwin) on I-76 / Penna Turnpike
Westmoreland	Hempfield Township–Adamsburg line	58.157	93.595		Adamsburg, Penn, Arona	Interchange; access via Edna Road
Westmoreland	Hempfield Township	61.432	98.865		PA Turnpike 66 – New Stanton, Delmont	Exit 6 on PA 66; E-ZPass or toll-by-plate
Westmoreland	Hempfield Township	62.975	101.348	Western end of freeway section		
Westmoreland	Hempfield Township	63.230	101.759		Pittsburgh Street	Eastbound exit and westbound entrance
Westmoreland	Greensburg–Hempfield Township line	63.994	102.988		PA 136 west – West Newton	Eastern terminus of PA 136
Westmoreland	Southwest Greensburg	64.904	104.453		US 119 (PA 66 Bus. north / PA 819) to I-70 – Connellsville, Blairsville	Southern terminus of PA 66 Bus.
Westmoreland	Hempfield Township	65.337	105.150		Cedar Street	No access across US 30
Westmoreland	Hempfield Township	65.991	106.202		Greensburg, Mount Pleasant	Access via Mt. Pleasant Road
Westmoreland	Hempfield Township	66.778	107.469		PA 130 (Pittsburgh Street) – Pleasant Unity	Eastbound exit and westbound entrance
Westmoreland	Hempfield Township	67.328	108.354		Greensburg Business District	Westbound exit and eastbound entrance
Westmoreland	Hempfield Township			Eastern end of freeway section		
Westmoreland	Hempfield Township				Westmoreland Mall	Interchange
Westmoreland	Unity Township	74.051	119.174		PA 981 (Clearview Drive) – Pleasant Unity, Latrobe	
Westmoreland	Unity Township	75.319	121.214		PA 982 – Youngstown, Baggaley, Bradenville, New Derry	Interchange
Westmoreland	Unity–Derry township line	76.880	123.726		PA 217 north – Derry	Southern terminus of PA 217
Westmoreland	Ligonier Township	81.623	131.359		PA 259 north – Bolivar	Southern terminus of PA 259
Westmoreland	Ligonier	83.875	134.984		PA 711 (Market Street) – Stahlstown, Oak Grove, Johnstown	
Westmoreland	Ligonier Township	85.825	138.122		PA 381 south – Rector, Linn Run State Park	Northern terminus of PA 381
Somerset	Jennerstown	95.113	153.070		PA 985 (Somerset Pike) – Somerset, Johnstown	
Somerset	Jenner Township	96.713	155.644		PA 601 (Front Street / Penn Avenue) – Somerset, Boswell	
Somerset	Jenner Township	98.360– 98.449	158.295– 158.438		US 219 – Somerset, Johnstown	Interchange
Somerset	Quemahoning Township	103.100	165.923		PA 281 south (Pine Avenue) – Friedens	Interchange; northern terminus of PA 281
Somerset	Quemahoning Township	103.518	166.596		PA 403 north (Triple S Road) – Kanter, Hooversville	Southern terminus of PA 403
Somerset	Stonycreek–Shade township line	110.444	177.742		PA 160 (Huckleberry Highway / Rock Cut Road) – Berlin, Windber	
Bedford	Schellsburg	121.637	195.756		PA 96 (Market Street) – Manns Choice, Pleasantville	
Bedford	Napier Township	126.386	203.399		PA 31 west (Allegheny Road) – Manns Choice, Cumberland, Somerset	Eastern terminus of PA 31
Bedford	Bedford Township	126.972	204.342		PA 56 west (Pensyl Hollow Road) – Altoona, Johnstown	Eastern terminus of PA 56
Bedford	Bedford Township	128.890	207.428		US 30 Bus. east (Pitt Street) – Bedford	Western terminus of US 30 Bus.
Bedford	Bedford Township			Western end of freeway section		
Bedford	Bedford Township	129.798	208.890		US 220 to I-99 north – Cumberland, Altoona	
Bedford	Bedford Township	131.979	212.400		US 30 Bus. west – Bedford Business District	Westbound left exit and eastbound left entrance; eastern terminus of US 30 Bus.
Bedford	Bedford Township	131.979	212.400	Eastern end of freeway section		
Bedford	Snake Spring Township	132.226	212.797		PA 326 south (Egolf Road) – Rainsburg	Northern terminus of PA 326
Bedford	Snake Spring Township	134.493	216.446		Pennknoll Road / Upper Snake Spring Road – Pennwood	Interchange; no westbound exit
Bedford	Snake Spring Township	135.173	217.540		Lutzville Road / Upper Snake Spring Road – Pennwood	Interchange; no westbound entrance
Bedford	Everett	137.482	221.256	Western end of freeway section		
Bedford	Everett	137.482	221.256		US 30 Bus. east to PA 26 south – Everett	Eastbound exit and westbound entrance; western terminus of US 30 Bus.
Bedford	West Providence Township	139.338	224.243		To PA 26 north – Huntingdon, Raystown Lake	Raystown Lake only appears on eastbound signage
Bedford	West Providence Township			Eastern end of freeway section		
Bedford	West Providence Township	140.319	225.822		US 30 Bus. west (Main Street) to PA 26 south – Everett	Eastern terminus of US 30 Bus.
Bedford	East Providence Township	147.243	236.965		I-70 east – Washington, D.C., Baltimore	Western end of I-70 concurrency
Bedford	East Providence Township	147.537	237.438		I-70 west to I-76 Toll / Penna Turnpike – Harrisburg, New Stanton	Interchange; eastern end of I-70 concurrency
Fulton	Brush Creek Township	150.652	242.451		PA 915 west (Crystal Springs Road) – Crystal Springs	Western end of PA 915 concurrency
Fulton	Brush Creek Township	152.036	244.678		PA 915 east (North Valley Road) – Hopewell	Eastern end of PA 915 concurrency
Fulton	Licking Creek Township	158.300	254.759		PA 655 (Pleasant Ridge Road) – Saltillo, Hancock	
Fulton	Todd Township	164.745	265.131		US 522 to PA 16 – McConnellsburg, Mount Union	Interchange
Franklin	Peters Township	172.541	277.678		PA 75 (Fort Loudon Road / Path Valley Road) – Mercersburg, Fannettsburg, Willow Hill	
Franklin	St. Thomas Township	177.517	285.686		PA 416 south (Mercersburg Road) – Lemasters, Mercersburg	Northern terminus of PA 416
Franklin	Hamilton Township	184.462	296.863		PA 995 south (Warm Spring Road) – Williamson	Northern terminus of PA 995
Franklin	Chambersburg	186.273	299.777		US 11 south (Main Street)	
Franklin	Chambersburg	186.384	299.956		US 11 north (2nd Street)	
Franklin	Chambersburg–Guilford Township line	187.766– 187.786	302.180– 302.212		I-81 – Carlisle, Hagerstown	Exit 16 on I-81
Franklin	Greene Township	194.100	312.374		PA 997 south (Anthony Highway) – Mont Alto, Waynesboro	Western end of PA 997 concurrency
Franklin	Greene Township	194.215	312.559		PA 997 north (Black Gap Road) – Scotland	Eastern end of PA 997 concurrency
Franklin	Greene Township	196.384	316.049		PA 233 (Pine Grove Road / Rocky Mountain Road) – Mont Alto, Newville	
Adams	Franklin Township	199.247	320.657		PA 234 east (Buchanan Valley Road) – Arendtsville, Biglerville	Western terminus of PA 234
Adams	Gettysburg	211.075	339.692		US 15 Bus. / PA 116 west (Carlisle Street / Baltimore Street) to PA 97 / PA 34	Traffic circle; western end of PA 116 concurrency
Adams	Gettysburg	211.314	340.077		PA 116 east (Hanover Street) – Hanover	Eastern end of PA 116 concurrency
Adams	Straban Township	213.288	343.254		US 15 – Harrisburg, Frederick	Interchange
Adams	Oxford–Hamilton– Berwick township tripoint	222.530	358.127		PA 94 (Carlisle Pike) – Harrisburg, Hanover	
Adams	Abbottstown	225.074	362.221		PA 194 (Queen Street)	Traffic circle
York	West Manchester Township	234.387	377.209		PA 116 west (Hanover Road)	Eastern terminus of PA 116
York	West Manchester Township	235.247	378.593		PA 616 south (Trinity Road) – New Salem	Northern terminus of PA 616
York	West Manchester Township	235.859	379.578	Western end of freeway section		
York	West Manchester Township	235.859	379.578		PA 462 east – York	Western terminus of PA 462
York	West Manchester Township	238.494	383.819		PA 74 (Carlisle Avenue) – Dover, West York	
York	West Manchester Township			Eastern end of freeway section		
York	Manchester Township	241.023	387.889		I-83 BL / PA 181 north (North George Street) to I-83 north – Harrisburg, Emigsville, York	Southern terminus of PA 181
York	Manchester Township	241.277	388.298		I-83 – Baltimore, Harrisburg	No eastbound exit to I-83 north; no westbound entrance from I-83 south; exit 21 on I-83
York	Springettsbury Township	243.169	391.343	Western end of freeway section		
York	Springettsbury Township	243.749	392.276		Memory Lane – East York	No westbound exit; no westbound entrance from southbound Memory Lane
York	Springettsbury Township	244.663	393.747		PA 24 (Mt. Zion Road)	
York	Hellam Township	247.700	398.635		To PA 462 – Hallam	Access via Kreutz Creek Road
York	Hellam Township	251.473	404.707		To PA 462 – Wrightsville	Access via Cool Springs Road
Susquehanna River		252.677	406.644	Wright's Ferry Bridge		
Lancaster	Columbia	253.903	408.617		PA 441 – Columbia, Marietta	
Lancaster	West Hempfield Township	256.997	413.597		Prospect Road	
Lancaster	West Hempfield Township	258.812	416.518		Mountville	Access via Stony Battery Road
Lancaster	East Hempfield Township	260.276	418.874		Centerville Road	
Lancaster	East Hempfield Township	262.393	422.281		PA 741 – Millersville, Rohrerstown	Access to Millersville University
Lancaster	Manheim Township–Lancaster line	263.486	424.040		Harrisburg Pike	Access to Franklin & Marshall College
Lancaster	Manheim Township	264.100	425.028		PA 72 (Manheim Pike)	Eastbound exit and westbound entrance
Lancaster	Manheim Township	264.423	425.548		PA 283 west – Harrisburg, Downtown Lancaster	Eastbound access to Downtown Lancaster and Fruitville Pike; eastern terminus of PA 283
Lancaster	Manheim Township	265.034– 265.757	426.531– 427.694		PA 501 (Lititz Pike) / PA 272 (Oregon Pike) / US 222 south	Eastbound signage
Lancaster	Manheim Township	265.034– 265.757	426.531– 427.694		PA 501 / US 222 south (Lititz Pike) / Fruitville Pike	Westbound signage; western end of US 222 concurrency
Lancaster	Manheim Township	265.034– 265.757	426.531– 427.694		PA 272 north (Oregon Pike)	Westbound signage
Lancaster	Manheim Township	266.416	428.755		US 222 north to I-76 – Ephrata, Reading	I-76 only appears on eastbound signage; Ephrata only appears on westbound signage; eastern end of US 222 concurrency
Lancaster	Manheim Township	267.161	429.954		PA 23 east (New Holland Avenue/Pike)	Western end of PA 23 concurrency
Lancaster	Lancaster–East Lampeter Township line	267.771	430.936		PA 23 west (Walnut Street)	Eastern end of PA 23 concurrency
Lancaster	Lancaster–East Lampeter Township line	268.497	432.104		Greenfield Road	
Lancaster	East Lampeter Township	269.387	433.536		PA 340 (Old Philadelphia Pike)	No westbound exit
Lancaster	East Lampeter Township	270.150	434.764		PA 462 west (Lincoln Highway) – Downtown Lancaster	Eastern terminus of PA 462
Lancaster	East Lampeter Township	270.150	434.764	Eastern end of freeway section		
Lancaster	East Lampeter Township	272.705	438.876		PA 896 – Strasburg	
Lancaster	Salisbury Township	281.639	453.254		PA 772 west (Newport Road)	Eastern terminus of PA 772
Lancaster	Salisbury Township	282.034	453.890		PA 41 south (Gap–Newport Pike) – Wilmington, DE	Northern terminus of PA 41
Lancaster	Salisbury Township	282.313	454.339		PA 897 north (White Horse Road)	Southern terminus of PA 897
Chester	West Sadsbury–Sadsbury township line	286.823	461.597		PA 10 (Octorara Trail) – Honey Brook, Parkesburg	
Chester	Sadsbury Township	287.555	462.775	Western end of freeway section		
Chester	Sadsbury Township	287.555	462.775		US 30 Bus. east	Eastbound exit and westbound entrance; western terminus of US 30 Bus.
Chester	Valley Township	290.087	466.850		Chester County Airport	Westbound exit and eastbound entrance; access via Airport Road
Chester	Coatesville–Valley Township line	292.916	471.403		PA 82 – Coatesville	
Chester	Caln Township	294.673	474.230		Reeceville Road	Access to Coatesville Veterans Hospital
Chester	Caln Township	297.056	478.065		PA 340 – Thorndale	
Chester	Caln Township	298.173	479.863		US 322 (Manor Avenue)	
Chester	Downingtown	299.393	481.826		PA 282 (Wallace Avenue)	Westbound exit and eastbound entrance; access via Norwood Road
Chester	East Caln Township	299.933	482.695		PA 113 to PA 100 – Downingtown, Lionville	Eastbound exit and westbound entrance
Chester	East Caln Township	300.913	484.273		US 30 Bus. (Lancaster Avenue)	
Chester	West Whiteland Township	303.841	488.985		PA 100 to US 202 south – Exton, West Chester (EB) PA 100 – Exton, West Chester (WB)	
Chester	West Whiteland Township	305.740	492.041		US 202 north – King of Prussia	Eastbound exit and westbound entrance
Chester	West Whiteland–East Whiteland township line	306.055	492.548	Eastern end of freeway section		
Chester	West Whiteland–East Whiteland township line	306.055	492.548		US 30 Bus. west – Exton; US 202 – King of Prussia, West Chester	Eastern terminus of US 30 Bus.
Chester	East Whiteland Township	307.519	494.904		PA 352 south (Sproul Road) – Chester, Immaculata University	Northern terminus of PA 352
Chester	East Whiteland Township	309.186	497.587		PA 401 west (Conestoga Road) – Elverson	Eastern terminus of PA 401
Chester	East Whiteland Township	309.486	498.069		PA 29 north (Morehall Road) to US 202 – Phoenixville	Southern terminus of PA 29
Chester	Tredyffrin Township	312.020	502.148		PA 252 (Bear Hill Road / Leopard Road) – Valley Forge, Newtown Square	
Delaware	Radnor Township	318.773– 318.902	513.015– 513.223		I-476 – Plymouth Meeting, Chester	Exit 13 on I-476
Delaware	Radnor Township	319.158	513.635		PA 320 (North Spring Mill Road / Sproul Road)	
Montgomery	No major junctions					
Delaware	No major junctions					
Montgomery–Philadelphia county line	Lower Merion Township–Philadelphia line	325.258	523.452		US 1 (City Avenue) – Bala Cynwyd, Upper Darby	
Philadelphia	Philadelphia	328.691	528.977	Western end of freeway section		
Philadelphia	Philadelphia	328.691	528.977	342	I-76 west / US 13 (Girard Avenue) – Valley Forge	Western end of I-76 concurrency
Philadelphia	Philadelphia			343	Spring Garden Street / Haverford Avenue	Eastbound exit and westbound entrance
Philadelphia	Philadelphia	329.8	530.8	344	I-76 east – International Airport I-676 begins	Eastern end of I-76 concurrency; western terminus of I-676; exit number not signed westbound
Philadelphia	Philadelphia			Vine Street Expressway Bridge over the Schuylkill River		
Philadelphia	Philadelphia	330.2	531.4		Ben Franklin Parkway / 23rd Street	
Philadelphia	Philadelphia	330.8	532.4		PA 611 (Broad Street) – Central Philadelphia	
Philadelphia	Philadelphia	331.2– 331.3	533.0– 533.2		I-95 (Delaware Expressway) – Chester, Philadelphia International Airport, New York	Access via Vine Street Expressway; exit 22 on I-95; to Penn's Landing; no eastbound entrance
Philadelphia	Philadelphia	331.2– 331.3	533.0– 533.2		Vine Street to PA 611 – Pennsylvania Convention Center	Westbound exit and eastbound entrance
Philadelphia	Philadelphia	331.2– 331.3	533.0– 533.2	Eastern end of freeway section		
Philadelphia	Philadelphia	331.2– 331.3	533.0– 533.2		8th Street south – Chinatown, Market East	
Philadelphia	Philadelphia	331.7	533.8		6th Street south – Independence Hall, Penn's Landing	
Philadelphia	Philadelphia	331.7	533.8	Western end of freeway section		
Philadelphia	Philadelphia				5th Street	Westbound exit and eastbound entrance
Delaware River		332.0	534.3	Benjamin Franklin Bridge (westbound toll in New Jersey)		
Delaware River		334.6	538.5		I-676 south / US 30 east – Camden, Cherry Hill	Continuation into New Jersey; former I-76
1.000 mi = 1.609 km; 1.000 km = 0.621 mi: Concurrency terminus; Electronic toll collection; Incomplete access; Tolled

== See also ==
U.S. Route 30
Previous state: West Virginia	Pennsylvania	Next state: New Jersey
