= Guldens, Pennsylvania =

Unincorporated community in Pennsylvania, US

Guldens
- Unincorporated community
- Location in Pennsylvania. Guldens (the United States)
- Coordinates: 39°51′30″N 77°08′20″W
- Country: United States
- State: Pennsylvania
- County: Adams
- Elevation: 581 ft (177 m)
- Time zone: UTC-5 (Eastern (EST))
  - Summer (DST): UTC-4 (EDT)
- Area codes: 717 & 223
- GNIS feature ID: 1176302

Guldens is an unincorporated community in Straban Township, Adams County, Pennsylvania, United States. It is located off U.S. Route 30, approximately five miles east of Gettysburg.
