= West Virginia Route 8 =

State highway in Hancock County, West Virginia, United States

West Virginia Route 8

Route information
- Maintained by WVDOH
- Length: 8.3 mi (13.4 km)

Major junctions
- South end: WV 2 in New Cumberland
- North end: US 30 / CR 16 near Chester

Location
- Country: United States
- State: West Virginia
- Counties: Hancock

Highway system
- West Virginia State Highway System; Interstate; US; State
← WV 7	→ WV 9

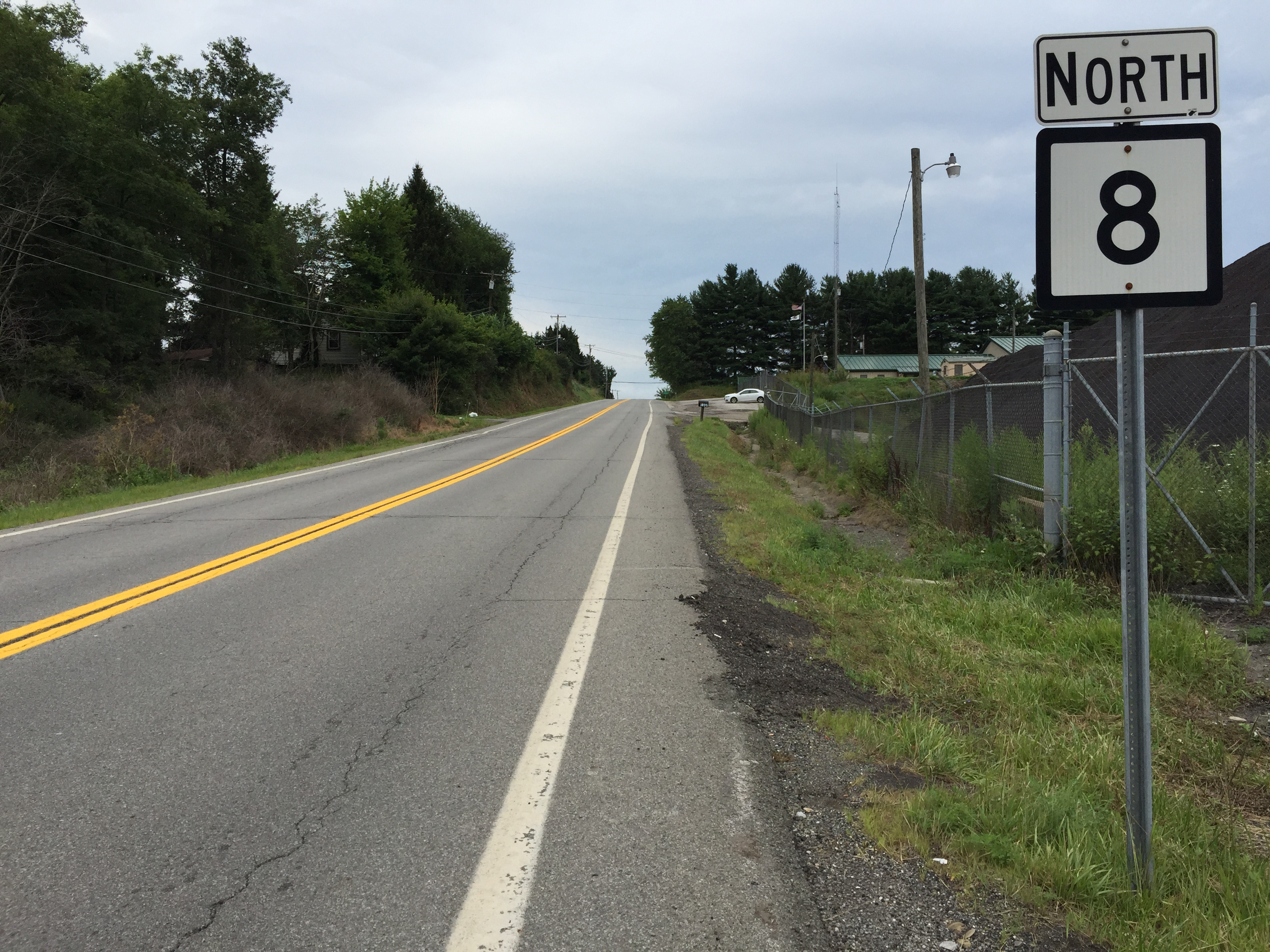
View north along WV 8 at CR 3 in New Manchester

West Virginia Route 8 is a north–south state highway in Hancock County in West Virginia's northern panhandle. The southern terminus of the route is at West Virginia Route 2 on the northern outskirts of New Cumberland. The northern terminus is at U.S. Route 30 southeast of Chester.

WV 8 was formerly part of WV 2, with WV 66 following present WV 2 north of New Cumberland.

== Major intersections ==
The entire route is in Hancock County.

Location	mi	km	Destinations	Notes
New Cumberland			WV 2 – Weirton, Chester	
			US 30 (Lincoln Highway) / CR 16 (Pyramus Road) – Chester, Pittsburgh	
1.000 mi = 1.609 km; 1.000 km = 0.621 mi
