= Woodland Hills School District =

School district in Pennsylvania

Coordinates: 40.41990°N 79.84073°W

Address
- 2552 Greensburg Pike Wilkinsburg, Allegheny County, Pennsylvania, 15221; United States

District information
- Type: Public
- Motto: Whatever it takes...our children are worth it!
- Established: 1981
- Superintendent: Dr. Joe Maluchnik

Students and staff
- District mascot: Wolverine
- Colors: Turquoise & Black and White

Other information
- Website: https://www.whsd.net/

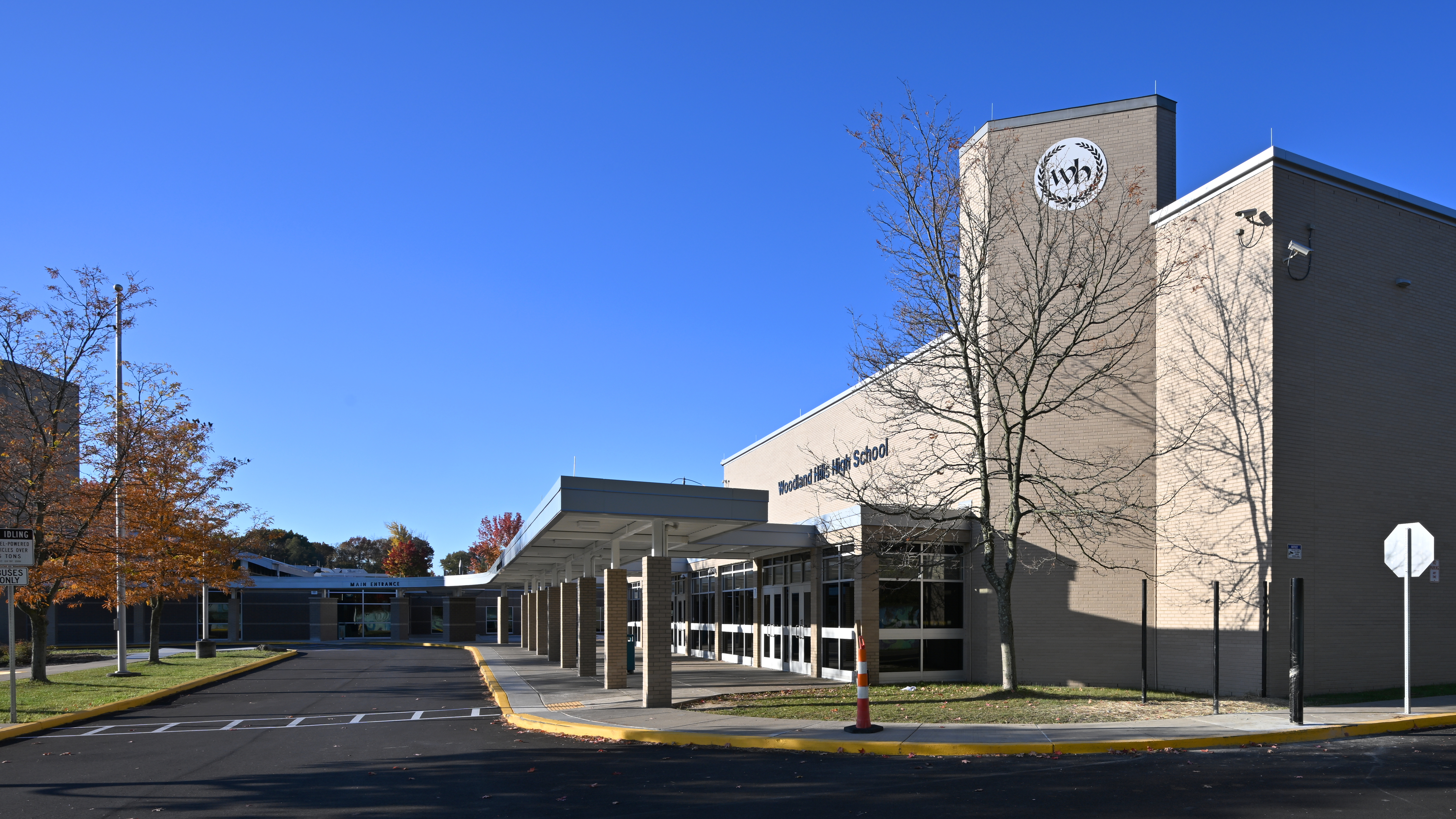
Woodland Hills High School

Woodland Hills School District is a public school district located in Allegheny County, Pennsylvania, serving twelve municipalities in the Pittsburgh area; Braddock, Braddock Hills, Chalfant, Churchill, East Pittsburgh, Edgewood, Forest Hills, North Braddock, Rankin, Swissvale, Turtle Creek and Wilkins Township (except for a small portion).

Woodland Hills School District encompasses approximately 12 square miles (31 km^{2}). According to 2000 federal census data, it serves a resident population of 52,876.

Woodland Hills School District was formed in July 1981 by a mandated merger of Edgewood, General Braddock, Swissvale, Churchill and Turtle Creek school districts. The Woodland Hills School District is unique in that it was formed by a court order (one of only three such districts so formed in Pennsylvania) in 1982 as a result of a Civil Rights Act lawsuit filed by various residents of the prior school districts. It was formed from an amalgamation of seven separate districts in the eastern region of Allegheny County in suburban Pittsburgh. The suit was filed to address the fact that the seven districts were all composed almost exclusively of all white or all black student enrollments. This resulted in African American students being transported long distances past all White schools and vice versa. The resultant court order created a single large school district of over 7,000 students comprised almost equally of white and black students.

Woodland Hills School District is bordered by eight other school districts: Pittsburgh S.D., Penn Hills S.D., Gateway S.D., East Allegheny S.D., Wilkinsburg Borough S.D. Also bordering (but across the Monongahela River from) Woodland Hills School District, is: West Mifflin S.D., Steel Valley S.D., and Duquesne City S.D. Woodland Hills School District's sports size classification is "AAAAA" (5A), which is the second largest of the PIAA's six classifications (single A through 6A).

== Schools ==
As of the fall of 2018, Woodland Hills School district serves approximately 3,500 students, and has five facilities:

- Woodland Hills High School (9–12) (Churchill)
- Woodland Hills Dickson (6-8) - Previously Dickson Intermediate School (Swissvale)
- Edgewood Elementary STEAM Academy (preK-5) (Edgewood)
- Turtle Creek Elementary STEAM Academy (preK-5) (Turtle Creek)
- Wilkins Elementary STEAM Academy (preK-5) (Wilkins Township)

Former schools

- East Junior High School (Turtle Creek)
- West Junior High School (Swissvale)
- Fairless Intermediate School (North Braddock)
- Rankin Intermediate School (Rankin)
- Shaffer Primary School, previously in Churchill, was razed. The borough had a proposal to put senior housing where Shaffer used to be.

=== Demographics ===
- 61.9% – African American/Non Hispanic
- 27.5% – White/Non-Hispanic
- 0.8% – Asian/Pacific Islander
- 2.6% – Hispanic
- 0.3% – American Indian/Alaska Native

== Extracurricular activities ==
=== Sports ===
Woodland Hills High School's athletics department sponsors almost thirty varsity sports. Woodland Hills competes in the AAAAA division of the WPIAL.

Varsity sports include Baseball, Boys/Girls Basketball, Boys/Girls Bowling, Boys/Girls Cross Country, Field Hockey, Boys Golf, Rifle, Boys/Girls Soccer, Softball, Boys/Girls Swimming, Boys/Girls Tennis, Boys/Girls Track, Boys/Girls Volleyball, Wrestling, Rugby, and Ultimate.

The Wolvarena is the football stadium for the Woodland Hills Wolverines. It has been named one of the top 10 places to watch high school football in the country. The Wolverines very rarely lose a home game, losing only 2 out of 40 since 1993. Its most successful varsity team is its football team led by head coach, George Novak, which won the regional AAAA championship in 1996, 1999, 2001, 2002, and 2009. Since 1987, Woodland Hills has sent 50 players to Division I schools

The Woodland Hills Rifle Team won state championships from 2014-2017 consecutively. They were WPIAL champions in 1992, 1998, 2012, 2014, 2015, 2016, and 2025. Mike Krivi won the Individual WPIAL championship for the rifle team in 2015.

The Woodland Hills boys track and field team tied for first place for the WPIAL section 4A championships in 2001. The team was coached by former Olympian Lindel Hodge.

=== Performing Arts ===
Woodland Hills High School prides itself in its yearly staging of popular musicals each spring and has won several Gene Kelly Awards for its performances. Woodland Hills also has a Marching Band for students in the high school.

==== Senior High Musicals (9-12) ====
- 1988 – Fiddler on the Roof
- 1989 – Hello, Dolly!
- 1990 – Anything Goes
- 1991 – Guys and Dolls*
- 1992 – Li'l Abner*
- 1993 – Peter Pan*
- 1994 – Annie Get Your Gun
- 1995 – Jesus Christ Superstar
- 1996 – The Mystery of Edwin Drood
- 1997 – The Music Man*
- 1998 – Man of La Mancha*
- 1999 – The Pirates of Penzance*
- 2000 – The King and I
- 2001 – On the Twentieth Century
- 2002 – Evita
- 2003 – Hello, Dolly!*
- 2004 – Anything Goes
- 2005 – Seussical
- 2006 – Pippin
- 2007 – Les Misérables
- 2008 – Beauty and the Beast
- 2009 – The Wizard of Oz*
- 2010 - Annie
- 2011 - The Phantom of the Opera*
- 2012 - Curtains
- 2013 - Young Frankenstein
- 2014 - Sweeney Todd
- 2015 - The Mystery of Edwin Drood*
- 2016 - Peter Pan
- 2017 - Spamalot
- 2018 - The Drowsy Chaperone*
- 2019 - Mamma Mia!*
- 2020 - Jesus Christ Superstar (Cancelled due to COVID-19)
- 2021 - Jesus Christ Superstar
- 2022 - Shrek*
- 2023 - Seussical
- 2024 - Wonderland (musical) | (Pilot production)
- 2025 - Hairspray (musical)

*Denotes Gene Kelly Award for Best Musical

== Notable alumni ==
- Steve Breaston: NFL Wide Receiver for Kansas City Chiefs, and Arizona Cardinals. Attended and played for the University of Michigan.
- Rob Gronkowski: NFL Tight End for New England Patriots, and Tampa Bay Buccaneers. Attended and played for the University of Arizona.
- Terrence Johnson: NFL Cornerback for Atlanta Falcons, Indianapolis Colts, and New England Patriots. Attended and played at California University of Pennsylvania.
- Summer Lee: Member of the U.S. House of Representatives from Pennsylvania’s 12th district.
- Wes Lyons: NFL Wide Receiver for Pittsburgh Steelers, and Spokane Shock. Attended and played at the West Virginia University.
- Lousaka Polite: NFL Fullback for Atlanta Falcons, New England Patriots, Miami Dolphins, Chicago Bears, and Dallas Cowboys. Attended and played for the University of Pittsburgh.
- Miles Sanders: NFL running back for the Carolina Panthers. Attended and played at Penn State University.
- Shawntae Spencer: NFL Cornerback for Oakland Raiders, and San Francisco 49ers. Attended and played for the University of Pittsburgh.
- Jason Taylor: NFL Defensive End for Miami Dolphins, Washington Redskins, and New York Jets. Attended and played for the University of Akron. Members of the NFL Hall of Fame
- Joy Taylor: Fox Sports Reporter
- Darrin Walls: NFL Cornerback for New York Jets, and Atlanta Falcons. Attended and played at Notre Dame University.
- Quinton Jefferson: NFL Defensive Lineman for the Cleveland Browns. Attended and played at the University of Maryland.
