= Woodland Hills High School =

Coordinates: 40.4363°N 79.8564°W

Woodland Hills Senior High School
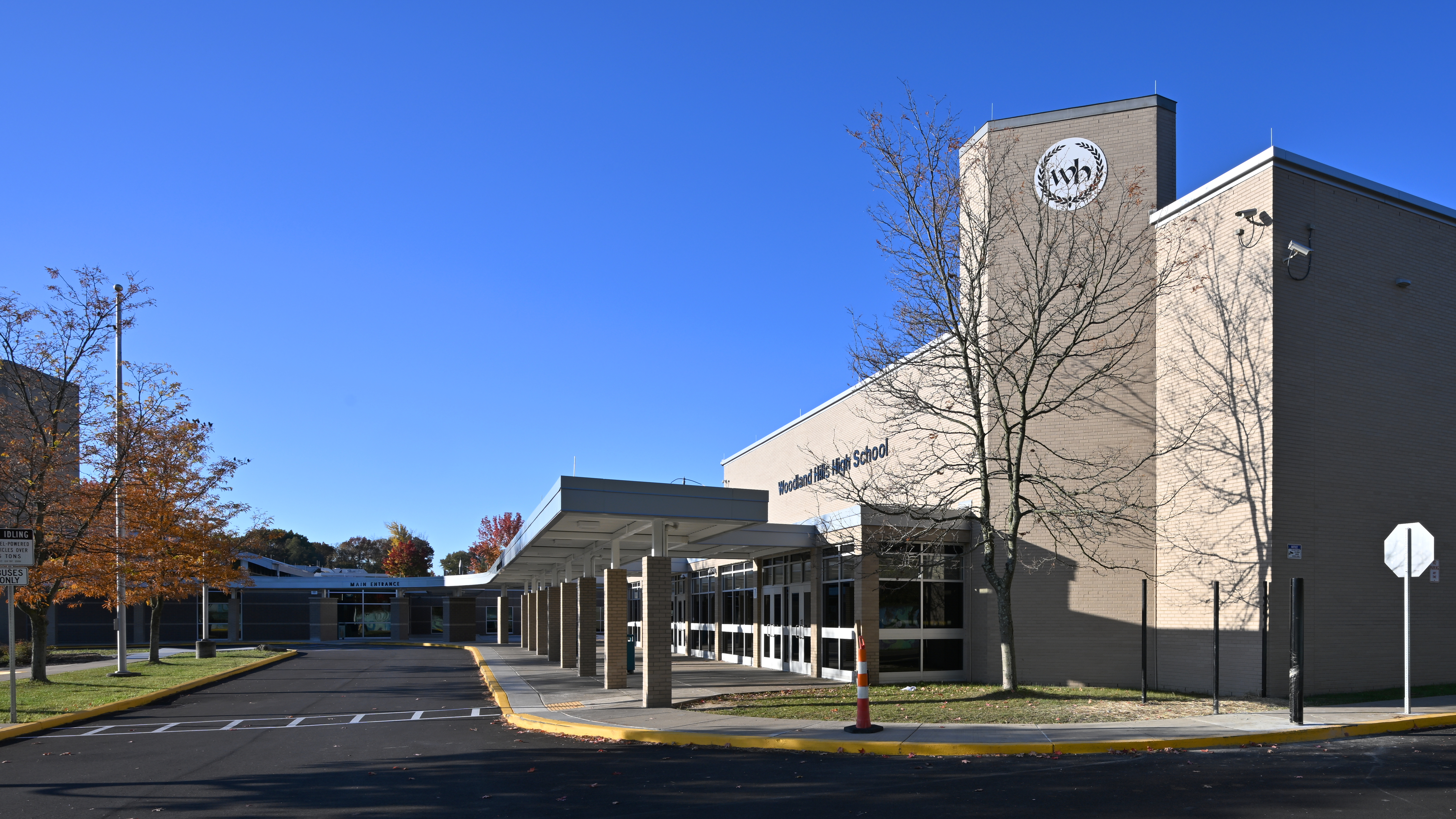

Location
- 2550 Greensburg Pike; Pittsburgh, Pennsylvania; United States

Information
- Type: Public
- Established: 1987
- School district: Woodland Hills School District
- Superintendent: Dr. Joe Maluchnik
- Staff: 67.85 (FTE)
- Grades: 9–12
- Enrollment: 966 (2023–2024)
- Student to teacher ratio: 14.24
- Colors: Blue, black, and white
- Mascot: Wolverine
- Website: https://hs.whsd.net/

Woodland Hills Senior High School is a large, suburban public high school providing grade 9-12 education for the Woodland Hills School District located in Churchill, Pennsylvania, United States. It serves the communities of Braddock, Braddock Hills, Chalfant, Churchill, East Pittsburgh, Edgewood, Forest Hills, North Braddock, Rankin, Swissvale, Turtle Creek and Wilkins Township. Woodland Hills High School was the result of a 1981 court-ordered desegregation merger. Before the merger, it was named Churchill High School.

In the 2018–2019 school year, enrollment was reported as 1,381 pupils in 9th through 12th grades.

Students may attend Forbes Road CTC for training in the trades. The Allegheny Intermediate Unit (IU3) provides the school with a wide variety of services like specialized education for disabled students and hearing, speech and visual disability services, as well as professional development for staff and faculty.

== Sports ==
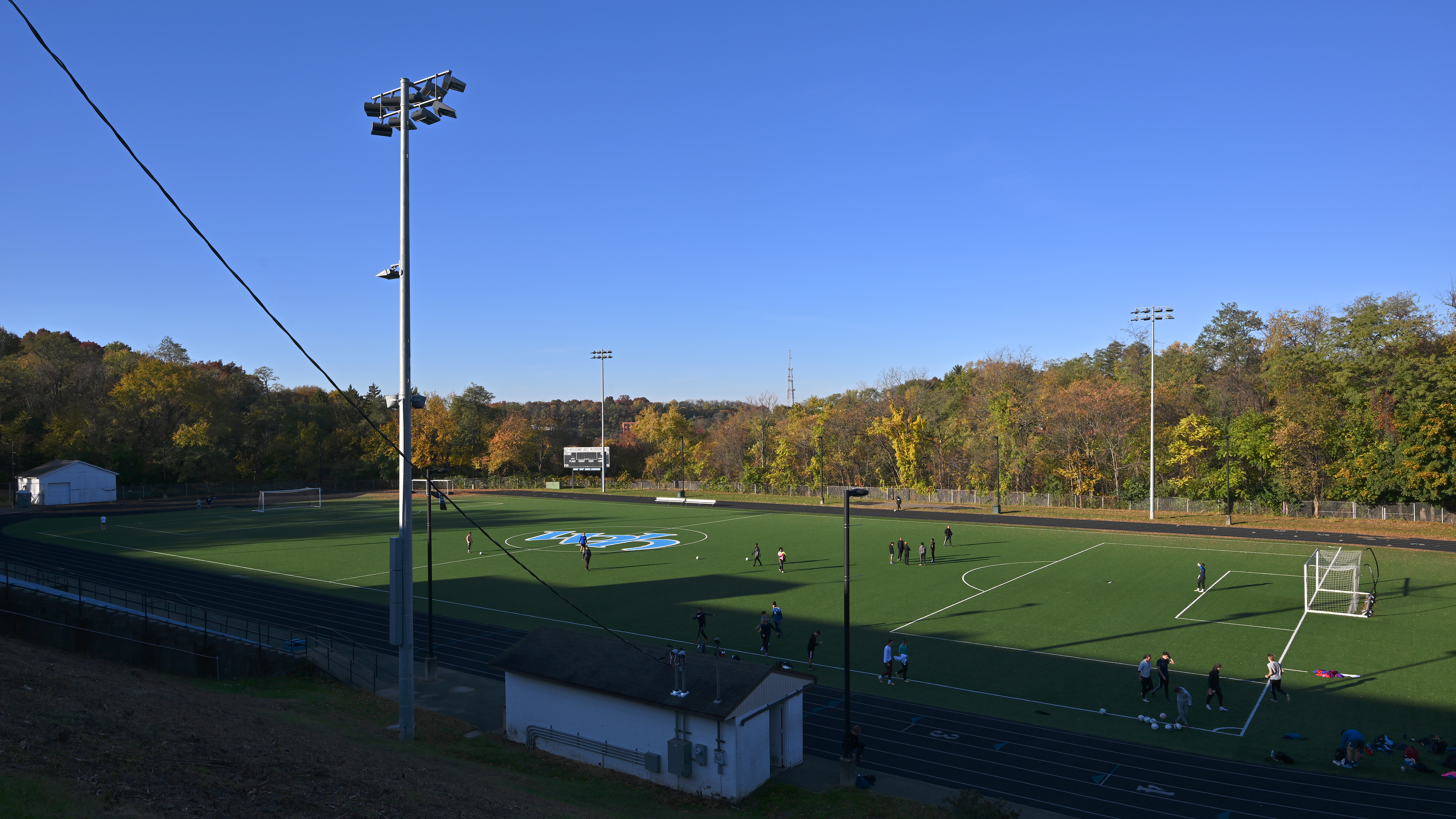
Woodland Hills High School soccer field, Pittsburgh, PA

The school's athletic teams are part of the Pennsylvania Interscholastic Athletic Association (PIAA) and the Western Pennsylvania Interscholastic Athletic League (WPIAL).

=== Notable accomplishments ===
- Girls' track - WPIAL Champion: 1987
- Girls' basketball - WPIAL Champion: 1997, PIAA State Runner-Up: 1997
- Bowling - WPIAL Champion: 2008
- Rifle - PIAA State Champion: 2014, 2015, 2016, 2017. PIAA Runner-Up: 2012. WPIAL Champion: 1992, 1998, 2012, 2014, 2015, 2016, 2025
- Football - PIAA State Runner-Up: 1996, 2001, 2002. WPIAL Champion: 1996, 1999, 2001, 2002, 2009.

The football program has produced nearly 100 Division I football recruits. In 2010, the school had six graduates in the NFL, the most of any high school in the United States: Jason Taylor, Steve Breaston, Lousaka Polite, Ryan Mundy, Shawntae Spencer and Rob Gronkowski. Other Wolverine alumni in the NFL include Miles Sanders, Terrence Johnson, Lafayette Pitts, Rontez Miles, Darrin Walls and Quinton Jefferson.

== Notable alumni ==
- Steve Breaston, former football wide receiver
- John Clayton, sportswriter
- Chris Edmonds, former football end and fullback
- Mark Gilbert, baseball player and diplomat
- Tirrell Greene, former football offensive lineman
- Rob Gronkowski, football tight end
- Alex Guminski, sports agent and attorney
- Quinton Jefferson, football defensive end
- Terrence Johnson, football cornerback
- Summer Lee, lawyer, politician, congresswoman for Pennsylvania's 18th district
- Wes Lyons, former football wide receiver
- Rontez Miles, football strong safety
- Ryan Mundy, former football safety
- Lafayette Pitts, football cornerback
- Lousaka Polite, former football fullback
- Tad Potter, businessman
- Ejuan Price, former football outside linebacker
- Antwon Rose Jr., fatally shot by East Pittsburgh police
- Miles Sanders, football running back
- Monte Simmons, football linebacker
- Shawntae Spencer, former football cornerback
- Jason Taylor, Hall of Fame football player
- Joy Taylor, media personality
- Jim Tomsula, football coach
- Darrin Walls, football player
- Jimmy Wopo, American rapper
