= Ryan Mundy =

American football player (born 1985)

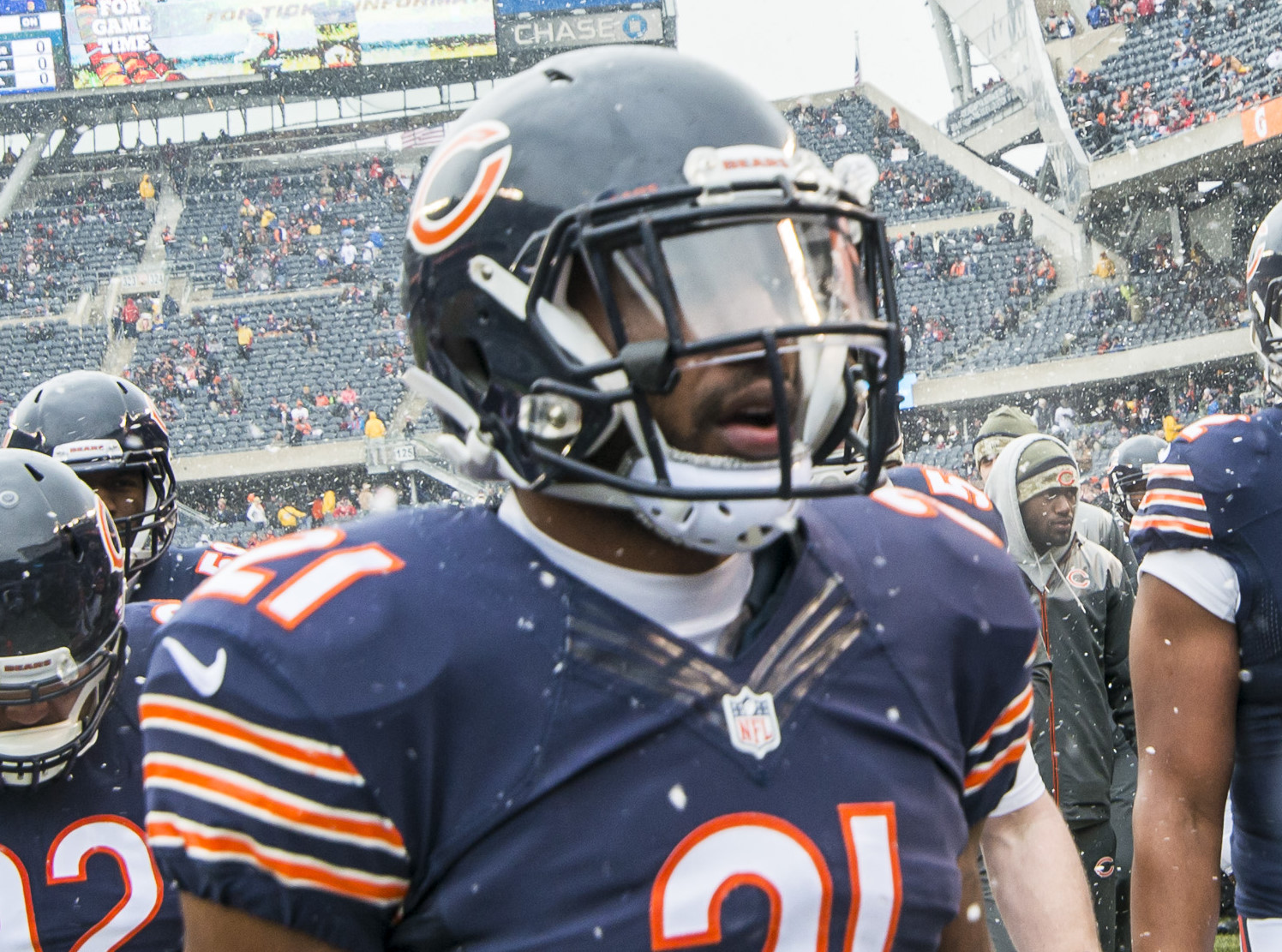
- Mundy with the Chicago Bears in 2014

No. 29, 21
- Position: Safety

Personal information
- Born: February 11, 1985 (age 41); Pittsburgh, Pennsylvania, U.S.
- Listed height: 6 ft 1 in (1.85 m)
- Listed weight: 209 lb (95 kg)

Career information
- High school: Woodland Hills (Pittsburgh)
- College: West Virginia
- NFL draft: 2008: 6th round, 194th overall pick

Career history
- Pittsburgh Steelers (2008–2012); New York Giants (2013); Chicago Bears (2014–2015)

Awards and highlights
- Super Bowl champion (XLIII)

Career NFL statistics
- Total tackles: 311
- Sacks: 2
- Fumble recoveries: 4
- Pass deflections: 16
- Interceptions: 6
- Defensive touchdowns: 1
- Stats at Pro Football Reference

Ryan Gregory Mundy (born February 11, 1985) is an American former professional football player who was a safety for eight seasons in the National Football League (NFL). He was selected by his hometown team, the Pittsburgh Steelers in the sixth round of the 2008 NFL draft. He played college football for the West Virginia Mountaineers and Michigan Wolverines. He won Super Bowl XLIII with the Steelers.

== Early life ==
Mundy played wide receiver and defensive back in high school at Woodland Hills High in suburban Pittsburgh, where his quarterback was fellow future Wolverine Steve Breaston. During his tenure there, he set a school career record of 54 receiving touchdowns and earned USA Today All-American prep honors. He also earned all-state honors and had a pair of interceptions in the U.S. Army All-American Bowl. Mundy was also a three-year track letterman. Mundy is also a former Pennsylvania Big 33 all-star. Ryan is one of the many successful players to reach the NFL from coach George Novak's football program at Woodland Hills.

== College career ==
=== Michigan ===
Mundy enrolled at the University of Michigan in 2003 and played in 11 games as a true freshman. As a sophomore in 2004, Mundy started in 12 games at free safety. In 2005, Mundy sat out with a medical redshirt after an injury in the beginning of the season. In 2006, Mundy returned and saw some action. Against Michigan State, Mundy set his career-high of eight tackles.

=== West Virginia ===
Mundy graduated from Michigan in 2007 with a year of eligibility remaining. Instead of finishing his college football career at Michigan, Mundy decided to enroll at West Virginia University and join the Mountaineers football team for the 2007 season. He took advantage of an NCAA rule that allowed seniors to transfer to another school and participate in athletics without having to sit out a season (as is normally required) if they wish to pursue a field of study that was unavailable at their previous school. Mundy enrolled at West Virginia and began work on a master's degree in sports administration.

Mundy excelled at practice during the 2007 preseason training. In his first game vs Western Michigan, Mundy had five total tackles. In the second game of the season, Mundy pounced on a Marshall fumble to recover the ball for the Mountaineers, along with his six tackles, in their 48–23 win. In the 21–13 loss to USF, Mundy recorded four tackles and his first interception as a Mountaineer. Against Syracuse in the 55–14 win at the Carrier Dome, Mundy had an interception on Syracuse's first drive off of a tipped pass. In the victory against Mississippi State for homecoming, Mundy recorded two pass deflections and five tackles. Against Rutgers, Mundy recorded an interception that he returned for 32 yards, his third interception of the season, and also had a hit on receiver Tiquan Underwood that knocked the ball out of his hands to save a touchdown along with 5 total tackles. In the victories over Louisville and Cincinnati, Mundy had a total of 4 tackles, two pass deflections, and a fumble recovery against Cincinnati. In the 66–21 victory over #20 UConn to clinch the Big East title, Mundy had only one tackle, but did recover a fumble. At the end of the regular season, Mundy earned the team's Coaches Contribution Award. In Mundy's final collegiate game, the 48–28 victory over Oklahoma in the Fiesta Bowl, he recorded a career-high 11 tackles.

Mundy finished his collegiate career in the 2007 season with 45 tackles, three interceptions, and two fumble recoveries. After the season, Mundy was selected by the National Football Foundation and College Football Hall of Fame's Hampshire Honor Society as a scholar-athlete.

Ironically, following Mundy's only season as a Mountaineer, West Virginia coach Rich Rodriguez left to become head coach of Michigan, where Mundy had started his college career.

== Professional career ==
=== Pre-draft ===
Mundy graduated from West Virginia University, but he was not invited to the NFL Scouting Combine. However, Mundy did work out at the West Virginia's Pro Day on March 13, 2008.

Pre-draft measurables
Height	Weight	40-yard dash	10-yard split	20-yard split	20-yard shuttle	Three-cone drill	Vertical jump	Broad jump	Bench press	Wonderlic
6 ft 1 in (1.85 m)	215 lb (98 kg)	4.51 s	1.59 s	2.62 s	4.2 s	6.81 s	36 in (0.91 m)	10 ft 10 in (3.30 m)	24 reps	29
All values from Pro Day.

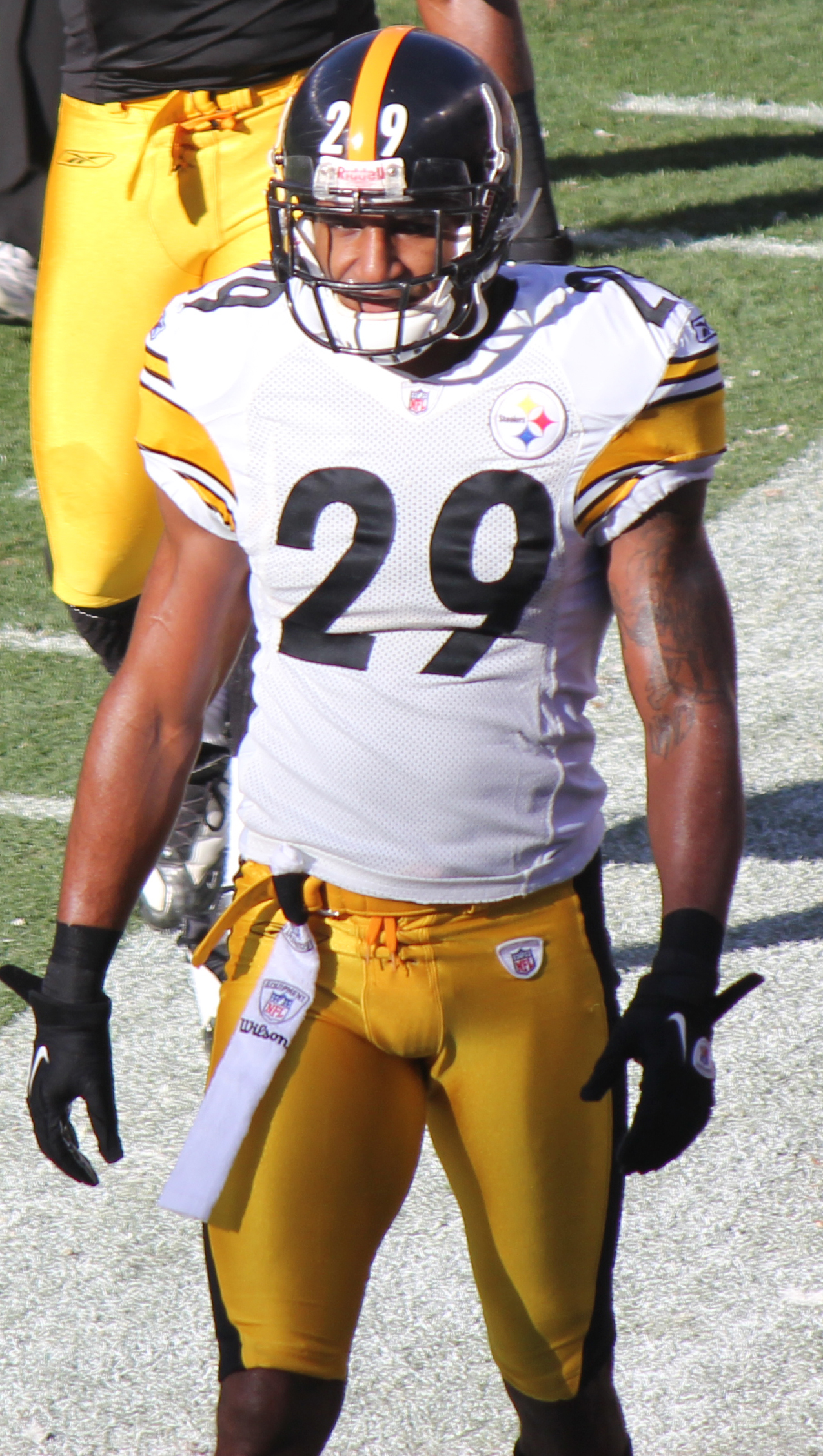
Mundy with the Steelers in 2011

=== Pittsburgh Steelers ===
Mundy was selected in the sixth round (194th overall) of the 2008 NFL draft by the Pittsburgh Steelers. Mundy was the third player drafted from West Virginia in the 2008 draft, preceded by Steve Slaton and Owen Schmitt. On June 14, Mundy signed a contract with the Steelers. In his first preseason game as a Steeler, Mundy recorded 3 tackles against the Philadelphia Eagles. In the game, he suffered a high ankle sprain and did not play in the remainder of the preseason. Mundy was released by the Steelers during final cuts. On November 11, Mundy was re-signed to the Steelers' practice squad. On February 6, 2009, Mundy was re-signed by the Steelers to a future contract. At the end of the 2010 season, Mundy and the Steelers appeared in Super Bowl XLV against the Green Bay Packers. He had one total tackle in the 31–25 loss. Mundy recorded a 33-yard reception on a fake punt vs. TEN (10/9/11). On September 26, 2012, Mundy was fined $21,000 for an illegal helmet-to-helmet hit against Oakland Raiders wide receiver Darrius Heyward-Bey.

=== New York Giants ===
Mundy signed with the New York Giants on March 14, 2013. His 91-yard interception return was the 3rd longest in Giants history since 1941.

=== Chicago Bears ===
Mundy signed with the Chicago Bears on March 11, 2014. During Monday Night Football against the New York Jets on September 22, 2014, Mundy intercepted Geno Smith and returned it for a 45-yard touchdown. This moment was better known as "Mundy Night Football". Mundy was fined $22,000 for a hit against Atlanta Falcons wide receiver Roddy White on October 12. A penalty flag was thrown on the play, but game officials decided that the hit was not made with the head and did not constitute a penalty. NFL officials subsequently decided that the hit was illegal and levied the fine. Mundy announced his intention to appeal the fine. During the 2014 season, Mundy started all 16 games and set career highs in tackles (108), interceptions (4), and passes broken up (4).

On August 30, 2015, the Bears placed Mundy on injured reserve due to a hip injury just before a pre-season finale against the Cleveland Browns.

== NFL career statistics ==
Legend
**Bold**	Career high

=== Regular season ===
Year	Team	Games		Tackles					Interceptions					Fumbles			
Year	Team	GP	GS	Cmb	Solo	Ast	Sck	TFL	Int	Yds	TD	Lng	PD	FF	FR	Yds	TD
2009	PIT	16	0	25	17	8	0.0	0	0	0	0	0	1	0	**1**	0	0
2010	PIT	16	2	29	23	6	0.0	0	0	0	0	0	4	0	0	0	0
2011	PIT	16	0	38	21	17	0.0	1	1	5	0	5	1	**2**	0	0	0
2012	PIT	16	3	39	31	8	0.0	3	0	0	0	0	2	0	**1**	0	0
2013	NYG	16	9	77	50	27	**1.0**	**4**	1	**91**	0	**91**	2	0	**1**	0	0
2014	CHI	16	16	**103**	**75**	**28**	**1.0**	1	**4**	52	**1**	45	**6**	0	**1**	0	0
Career		96	30	311	217	94	2.0	9	6	148	1	91	16	2	4	0	0

=== Postseason ===
Year	Team	Games		Tackles					Interceptions					Fumbles			
Year	Team	GP	GS	Cmb	Solo	Ast	Sck	TFL	Int	Yds	TD	Lng	PD	FF	FR	Yds	TD
2010	PIT	3	0	2	0	**2**	0.0	0	0	0	0	0	0	0	0	0	0
2011	PIT	1	1	**5**	**5**	0	0.0	0	0	0	0	0	0	**2**	0	0	0
Career		4	1	7	5	2	0.0	0	0	0	0	0	0	2	0	0	0
