= North Braddock, Pennsylvania =

Borough in Pennsylvania, US

- Borough
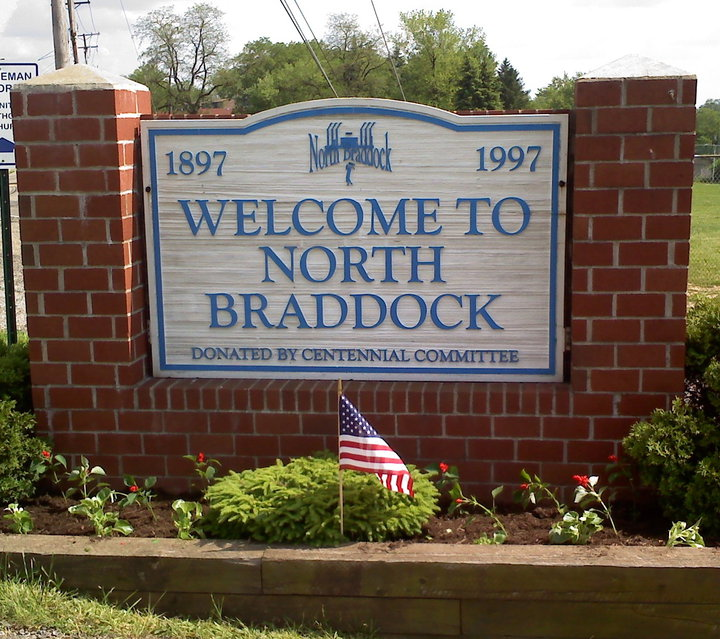
- Borough Welcome Sign
- Etymology: Edward Braddock
- Location in Allegheny County and the state of Pennsylvania.
- Coordinates: 40°24′18″N 79°51′23″W
- Country: United States
- State: Pennsylvania
- County: Allegheny
- Founded: 1897

Government
  - Mayor: Cletus Lee (D)

Area
  - Total: 1.55 sq mi (4.02 km^{2})
  - Land: 1.49 sq mi (3.87 km^{2})
  - Water: 0.062 sq mi (0.16 km^{2})

Population (2020)
  - Total: 4,320
  - Density: 2,894.7/sq mi (1,117.65/km^{2})
- Time zone: EST
  - Summer (DST): EDT
- ZIP code: 15104
- Area code: 412
- FIPS code: 42-54816
- School District: Woodland Hills
- Website: www.northbraddockborough.com

North Braddock is a borough in Allegheny County, Pennsylvania, United States, along the Monongahela River. The 2020 census had the borough population at 4,320. It is a suburb 11 miles (18 km) east of Pittsburgh. Organized from a part of Braddock Township in 1897, the borough prides itself in being the "Birthplace of Steel" as the home of Andrew Carnegie's Edgar Thomson Steel Works that opened in 1875.

== History ==
=== Origins ===
In 1742, a Scottish trader named John Fraser from eastern Pennsylvania acquired land at the location of the current Edgar Thomson Steel Works from Queen Aliquippa and the Lenape people. Fraser settled his family on the location, and in 1753 Christopher Gist and George Washington met with Fraser while delivering messages from Governor Robert Dinwiddie of Virginia to French commanders at Fort LeBoeuf, in present-day Waterford. Dinwiddie demanded the French commanders withdraw from western Pennsylvania. Fearing that a conflict was on the horizon, Fraser returned to Philadelphia in 1754.

In 1755, General Edward Braddock and British troops left Virginia and used Fraser as the guide with General Washington as the aide on the expedition. The objective of the expedition was to expel the French at Fort Duquesne. It was on July 9, 1755, when the British troops arrived at Fraser's cabin to be met with gunfire from the French troops. During the battle Braddock was wounded, dying on July 13, 1755, in nearby Uniontown. The area where Braddock was shot became known as Braddock's Field. Historical markers identify the site on present-day Jones Avenue across from Benjamin Fairless School. Braddock's Battlefield History Center commemorates this battle.

=== Whiskey Rebellion ===
During the late 18th-century farming was prevalent in the North Braddock area with the nearby Monongahela River used for trade. Whiskey became a very profitable product to trade, with much being sent to the New Orleans area. In 1794 a whiskey tax was created, drawing in protest over 8,000 settlers from western Pennsylvania to the North Braddock area, as part of the Whiskey Rebellion. The angry settlers would not disperse easily, and President Washington led an army to suppress the rebellion.

=== Wallace Mansion ===
The British commander of Fort Pitt, Captain Edmondstone, had signed a grant of 328 acres (1.33 km^{2}) of land from King George III of Great Britain to Peter Rowletter. Once the French and Indian War was over, Rowletter sold the land to Pittsburgh judge George Wallace, who bought around 328 acres (1.33 km^{2}) of land, including part of Braddock's Field, on March 4, 1791. Here Wallace built a mansion as his summer home. Later the Marquis de La Fayette visited the country as the Guest of the Nation, and while doing so he stopped by Judge Wallace's mansion on May 28, 1825. After Wallace's death the home was left to his nephew who lost the property to a sheriff sale. The Wallace mansion would be used as a boarding school called the Edgeworth Ladies Seminary during the 1830s.

=== Coal and steel ===
In 1835 the first coal mine opened between the hills near Sixth Street. During the 19th century the railroad industry was expanding across the country. Andrew Carnegie, with the increasing demands in steel for the railroad, began to build his first steel mill in 1872, named for John Edgar Thomson, the president of the Pennsylvania Railroad. By 1873 the demand for steel for the railroad had decreased, and the construction of the mill was halted. Good news came though when Carnegie secured a $2 million loan and finished the steel mill to roll its first steel under the supervision of superintendent William R. Jones. The mill would go on to expand, and in 1880 the first blast furnace was used at the Edgar Thomson Steel Works.

=== Incorporation ===
During 1897, East Pittsburgh tried to annex the land around the mill of North Braddock, known as Bessemer, that was part of Braddock Township. Residents of Shady Park village (3rd ward) and of Wolftown (1st ward) came together to hold meetings on stopping East Pittsburgh from annexing the land near the mill known as Braddock's Field. William Yost serving as North Braddock's attorney petitioned the Quarter Sessions of Allegheny County that Shady Park and Wolftown would join as one town, also incorporating Braddock's Field. During the meetings 317 of 510 property owners signed an agreement helping Judge Kennedy make his ruling to form a new town. On Monday, April 26, 1897, North Braddock was incorporated as a borough. Judge Kennedy of the Quarter Sessions Court of Allegheny County made the ruling and ordered the decree for the new borough. The first election of officials was to be held on May 18, 1897. The winners of the election included the burgess Henry Anderson, councilmen Joseph Wallace, John Walberg, John Maxwell, WJ Vance, Thomas Clark, J Grant Anderson, Fred Edwards, tax collector John Hutzen, and school directors Jones, Johnson, Scott, Colmey, Crossey, and Anderson.

North Braddock celebrated its borough centennial with a festival of events in June 1997.

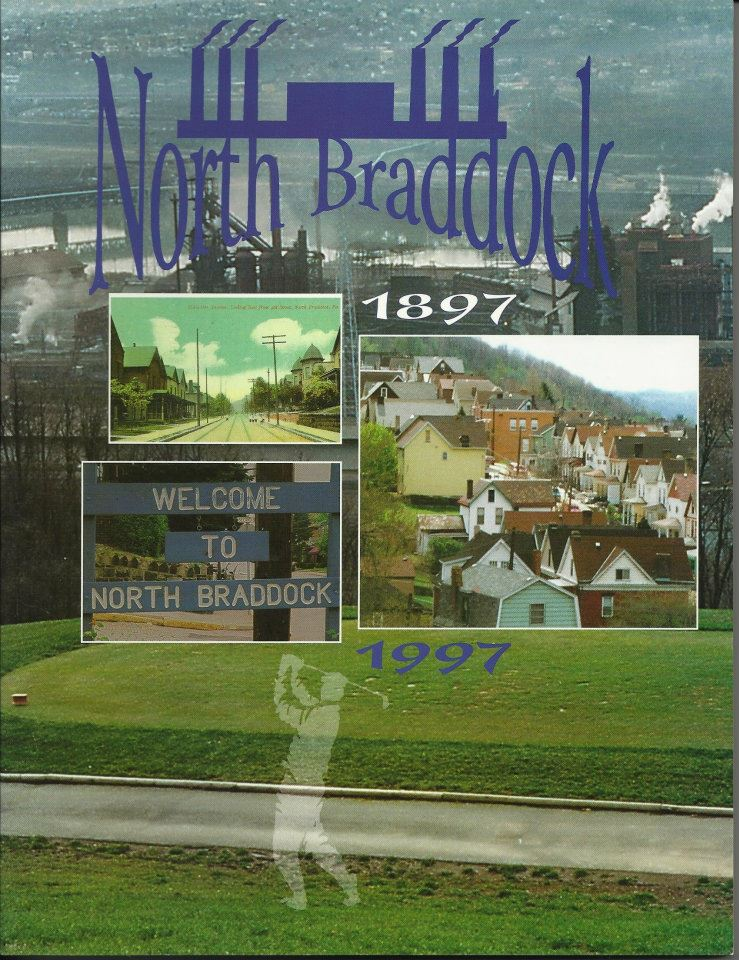
North Braddock Centennial Book (1997)

== Geography ==
North Braddock is located at 40°24′18″N 79°51′23″W (40.405025, −79.856500). It occupies a slope of terrain between Braddock, which touches the Monongahela River, and East Pittsburgh, which occupies the highest ground.

According to the United States Census Bureau, the borough has a total area of 1.6 square miles (4.1 km^{2}), of which 1.5 square miles (3.9 km^{2}) is land and 0.1 square miles (0.26 km^{2}), or 3.75%, is water.

=== Surrounding and adjacent neighborhoods ===
North Braddock has five land borders, including Braddock Hills to the north, Chalfant to the northeast, Wilkins Township to the east, East Pittsburgh to the east and southeast, and Braddock to the southwest and west. Across the Monongahela River to the south, North Braddock runs adjacent with Kennywood Park in West Mifflin.

== Demographics ==
Historical population
Census	Pop.	Note	%±
1900	6,535		—
1910	11,824		80.9%
1920	14,928		26.3%
1930	16,782		12.4%
1940	15,679		−6.6%
1950	14,724		−6.1%
1960	13,204		−10.3%
1970	10,838		−17.9%
1980	8,711		−19.6%
1990	7,036		−19.2%
2000	6,410		−8.9%
2010	4,857		−24.2%
2020	4,320		−11.1%

=== 2020 census ===
As of the 2020 census, North Braddock had a population of 4,320. The median age was 39.5 years. 23.1% of residents were under the age of 18 and 18.1% of residents were 65 years of age or older. For every 100 females there were 91.2 males, and for every 100 females age 18 and over there were 85.4 males age 18 and over.

100.0% of residents lived in urban areas, while 0.0% lived in rural areas.

There were 2,030 households in North Braddock, of which 23.7% had children under the age of 18 living in them. Of all households, 19.5% were married-couple households, 28.7% were households with a male householder and no spouse or partner present, and 44.4% were households with a female householder and no spouse or partner present. About 43.8% of all households were made up of individuals and 15.7% had someone living alone who was 65 years of age or older.

There were 2,418 housing units, of which 16.0% were vacant. The homeowner vacancy rate was 2.8% and the rental vacancy rate was 8.2%.

Racial composition as of the 2020 census
Race	Number	Percent
White	1,777	41.1%
Black or African American	2,165	50.1%
American Indian and Alaska Native	1	0.0%
Asian	16	0.4%
Native Hawaiian and Other Pacific Islander	0	0.0%
Some other race	40	0.9%
Two or more races	321	7.4%
Hispanic or Latino (of any race)	109	2.5%

=== 2000 census ===
As of the 2000 census, there were 6,410 people, 2,631 households, and 1,681 families residing in the borough. The population density was 4,155.5 inhabitants per square mile (1,604.4/km^{2}). There were 3,250 housing units at an average density of 2,106.9 per square mile (813.5/km^{2}). The racial makeup of the borough was 61.70% White, 35.30% African American, 0.17% Native American, 0.31% Asian, 0.05% Pacific Islander, 0.59% from other races, and 1.87% from two or more races. Hispanic or Latino of any race were 1.25% of the population.

There were 2,631 households, out of which 28.5% had children under the age of 18 living with them, 35.0% were married couples living together, 23.0% had a female householder with no husband present, and 36.1% were non-families. 31.8% of all households were made up of individuals, and 15.6% had someone living alone who was 65 years of age or older. The average household size was 2.43 and the average family size was 3.06.

In the borough the population was spread out, with 27.0% under the age of 18, 6.7% from 18 to 24, 26.5% from 25 to 44, 21.5% from 45 to 64, and 18.4% who were 65 years of age or older. The median age was 39 years. For every 100 females, there were 89.3 males. For every 100 females age 18 and over, there were 82.6 males.

The median income for a household in the borough was $24,335, and the median income for a family was $30,473. Males had a median income of $30,960 versus $22,281 for females. The per capita income for the borough was $14,076. About 18.0% of families and 22.7% of the population were below the poverty line, including 40.4% of those under age 18 and 9.2% of those age 65 or over.

== Government ==
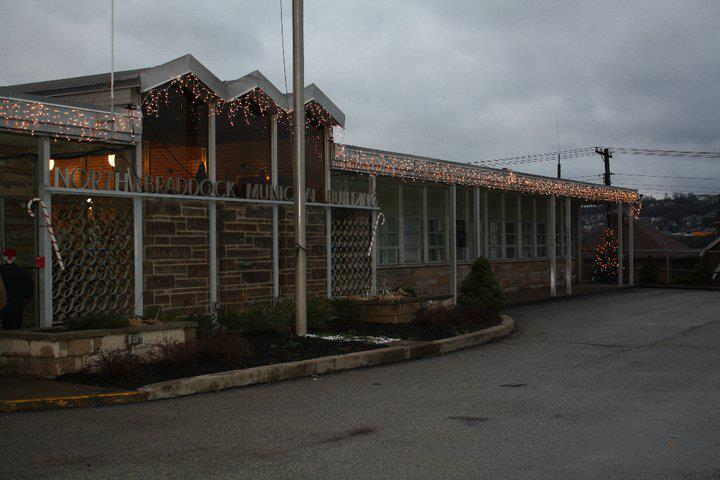
North Braddock Municipal Building

North Braddock has a borough government. The borough has nine elected council members and a mayor who serve four-year terms. The borough manager conducts daily business and operates with the budget passed by council. Ordinances and building codes are enforced by the appointed code official. The borough solicitor provides legal consultation for legal issues. An engineering firm is contracted to provide consultation for infrastructure issues. The elected tax collector serves a four-year term. North Braddock is a member of the Turtle Creek Valley Council of Governments.

	Mayors		
1897 - Henry Anderson	1914 - H. B. Miller	1982 - Elmer DeVay	2022 - Cletus Lee
1899 - F. K. Leighton	1918 - B. M. Bartilson	1983 - Steven Yanowitch	
1903 - Johnson Snyder	1922 - Harvey Hunter	1984 - Norman Irvin	
1904 - A. T. Reid	1926 - G. Fenton Mitchell	1989 - Jerome Sepesy	
1906 - George Whitfield	1938 - P. J. McLeigh	1990 - George Choma	
1909 - James McWilliams	1951 - Michael Pendro	1994 - Raymond McDonough	
1910 - John McCune	1966 - Thomas Curran	2010 - Thomas Whyel	
1911 - A. L. Best	1981 - Norman Irvin	2021 - Albert Senic	

	Council	
Ward 1	Ward 2	Ward 3
Charles Nigro (Dec. 2023)	Zena Ruiz (Dec. 2025)	Michael Breaston (Dec. 2023)
Jerome Sepesy (Dec. 2025)	John Vahosky (Dec. 2023)	Juanita Giles (Dec. 2025)
Teresa Parker (Dec. 2025)	Victoria Vargo (Dec. 2025)	Lisa Franklin-Robinson (Dec. 2023)

Presidential election results
Year	Republican	Democratic	Third parties
2020	22% 454	76% 1,560	1% 22
2016	22% 445	77% 1,545	1% 22
2012	20% 417	79% 1,681	1% 27

== Education ==
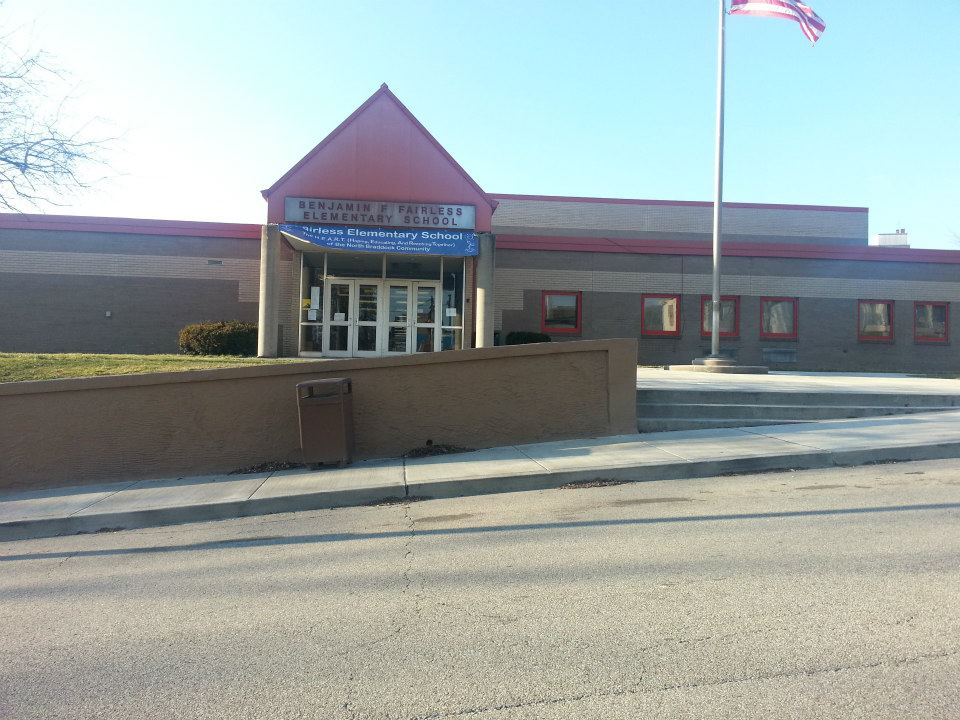
Woodland Hills School District Administration Center

It is in the Woodland Hills School District.

North Braddock once operated its own school district but was later merged into the General Braddock Area School District in the 1970s.

General Braddock Area School District was merged under court orders into the Woodland Hills School District in 1981 with 12 other nearby communities. The Woodland Hills Administration Building is located in the former Fairless Elementary School on Jones Avenue in North Braddock.

The comprehensive high school for the district is Woodland Hills High School.

== Public safety ==
- North Braddock VFD - Fire and rescue services are provided by the North Braddock VFD. The department is staffed by all volunteers. Two fire stations are used on Wolfe Avenue and Bell Avenue with three apparatus trucks.
- Eastern Regional Mon Valley Police - The regional police department was created in 2024 to combine resources while serving the communities of North Braddock, East Pittsburgh, & Rankin. The regional police commission oversees the department with community representatives on the commission board.
- Priority One EMS - Priority One EMS provides emergency ambulance services staffed by certified EMT and Paramedic personnel. Priority One also serves Braddock, East Pittsburgh, and Rankin.

== Notable people ==
- Steve Breaston, NFL wide receiver, star player for the University of Michigan and Woodland Hills High School.
- Summer Lee, U.S. representative for Pennsylvania's 12th congressional district.
- Wes Lyons, NFL tight end/wide receiver, star player at West Virginia University and Woodland Hills High School. Also an author of his first book, "The Pursuit With Patience".
- Coley McDonough, NFL quarterback for the Pittsburgh Steelers and Chicago Cardinals. Star player for the North Carolina State University and North Braddock Scott High School. Coley was tragically killed in the line of duty as a Pittsburgh police officer after his football career.
- Elmer Merkovsky, NFL player for the Pittsburgh Steelers, star player at the University of Pittsburgh, and North Braddock Scott High School.
- Lousaka Polite, NFL fullback, who was a star player at the University of Pittsburgh, and Woodland Hills High School.
- Fran Rogel, NFL fullback for the Pittsburgh Steelers and star player at Penn State University and North Braddock Scott High School.
- Benjamin L. Rosenbloom, North Braddock High School and West Virginia University graduate who practiced law and became a US Representative for West Virginia.
- Jim Zockoll, franchising pioneer
