= Edgewood School District =

School district in Pennsylvania

Location
- Maple Avenue, Edgewood Pennsylvania, 15218; United States
- Coordinates: 40.43190°N 79.88150°W

District information
- Type: Public
- Grades: K-12
- Established: October 6, 1892; 133 years ago
- Closed: July 1981
- Budget: Approx. $1.5 M or $2,200/student

Students and staff
- Enrollment: Approx. 700 students in 1980
- District mascot: Viking
- Colors: Maroon & White

Edgewood School District was a public school district serving the families of Edgewood, Allegheny County, Pennsylvania and surrounding communities by providing K-12 public education. The school opened October 6, 1892 in the town of Edgewood and operated for 90 years before closing. The Edgewood School District was eliminated by court order in July 1981 when the students of Edgewood were included in the newly formed, larger, Woodland Hills School District.
