= Lafayette Pitts =

American football player (born 1992)

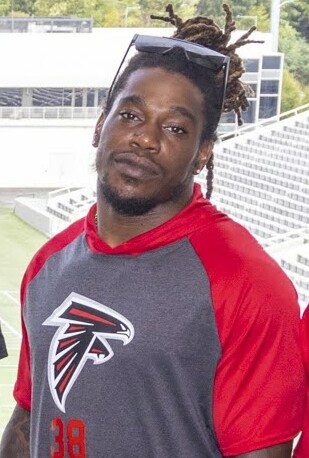
- Pitts with the Atlanta Falcons in 2022

No. 40, 29, 30
- Position: Cornerback

Personal information
- Born: September 24, 1992 (age 34); Duquesne, Pennsylvania, U.S.
- Listed height: 5 ft 11 in (1.80 m)
- Listed weight: 195 lb (88 kg)

Career information
- High school: Woodland Hills (Churchill, Pennsylvania)
- College: Pittsburgh (2011–2015)
- NFL draft: 2016: undrafted

Career history
- Miami Dolphins (2016); Jacksonville Jaguars (2017); Buffalo Bills (2017–2018); Indianapolis Colts (2020)*; Buffalo Bills (2020)*; Pittsburgh Steelers (2021)*; Atlanta Falcons (2021)
- * Offseason or practice squad member only

Career NFL statistics
- Total tackles: 21
- Stats at Pro Football Reference

Lafayette E. Pitts (born September 24, 1992) is an American former professional football player who was a cornerback in the National Football League (NFL). He played college football for the Pittsburgh Panthers, and was signed by the Miami Dolphins as an undrafted free agent in 2016.

== Professional career ==
Pre-draft measurables
Height	Weight	Arm length	Hand span	40-yard dash	10-yard split	20-yard split	20-yard shuttle	Three-cone drill	Vertical jump	Broad jump	Bench press
5 ft 11 in (1.80 m)	190 lb (86 kg)	29 5/8 in (0.75 m)	9 in (0.23 m)	4.46 s	1.59 s	2.65 s	4.27 s	6.81 s	33.5 in (0.85 m)	10 ft 2 in (3.10 m)	12 reps
All values are from Pro Day

=== Miami Dolphins ===
After going unselected in the 2016 NFL draft, Pitts signed with the Miami Dolphins on May 6, 2016. On September 3, he was waived by the Dolphins during final team cuts. Pitts was signed to the Dolphins' practice squad the following day. On November 7, he was promoted from the practice squad to the active roster.

On September 2, 2017, Pitts was waived by the Dolphins.

=== Jacksonville Jaguars ===
On September 3, 2017, Pitts was claimed off waivers by the Jacksonville Jaguars. He was waived by the Jaguars on October 24.

=== Buffalo Bills (first stint) ===
On October 25, 2017, Pitts was claimed off waivers by the Buffalo Bills. Pitts was re-signed to a one-year deal on April 16, 2018.

After another season as a core special teams player for the Bills, Pitts signed another one-year deal on February 12, 2019. He was released on August 31.

=== Indianapolis Colts ===
On December 30, 2019, Pitts signed a reserve/future contract with the Indianapolis Colts. He was waived on September 5, 2020.

=== Buffalo Bills (second stint) ===
On October 14, 2020, Pitts was signed to the Buffalo Bills' practice squad. He was released on November 3. On December 14, Pitts re-signed with the Bills' practice squad. He was released on January 1, 2021.

=== Pittsburgh Steelers ===
On August 6, 2021, Pitts signed with the Pittsburgh Steelers. He was waived on August 28.

=== Atlanta Falcons ===
On November 10, 2021, Pitts was signed to the Atlanta Falcons' practice squad. He signed a reserve/future contract with the Falcons on January 10, 2022. Pitts was released on August 23.
