= Miles Sanders =

American football player (born 1997)

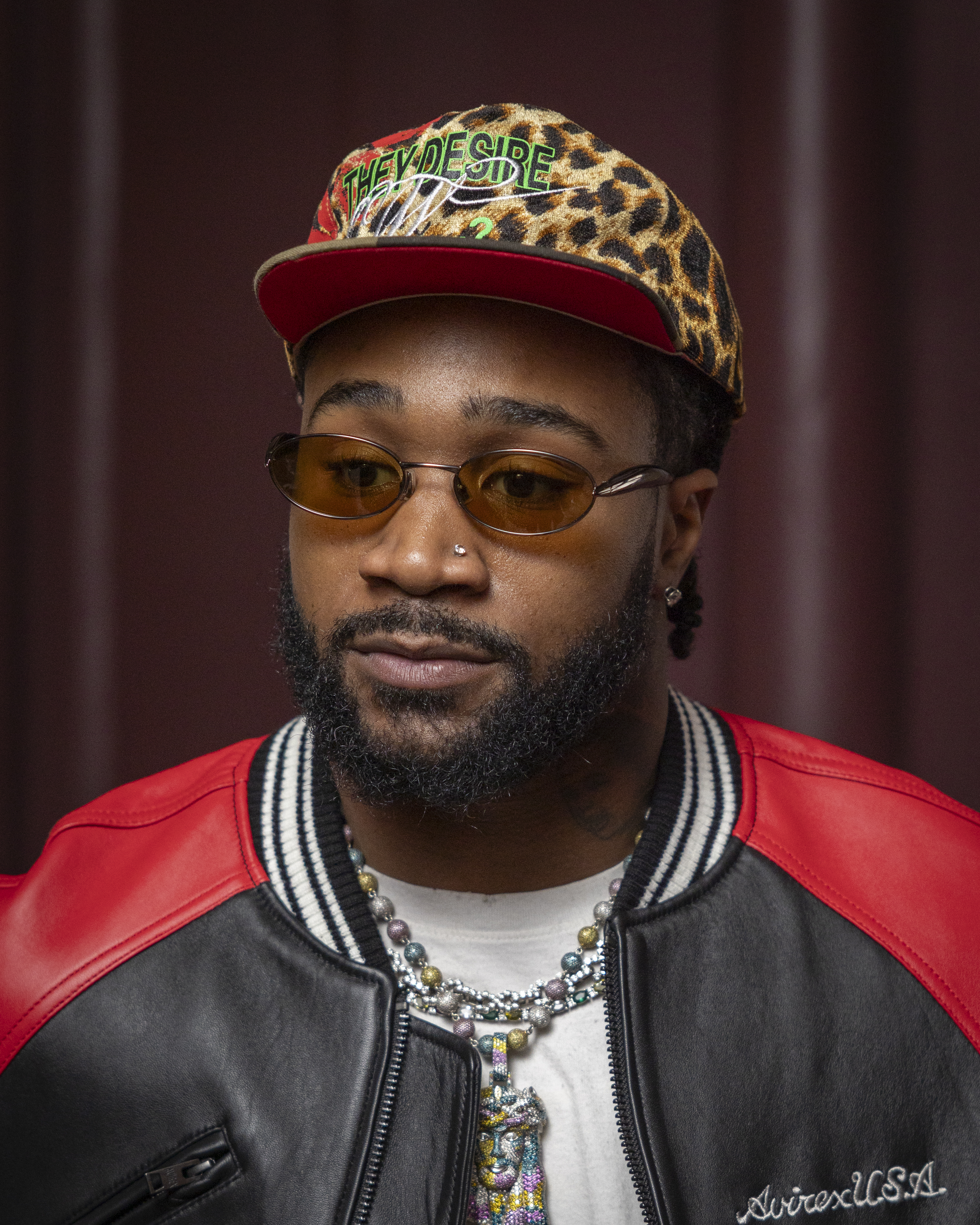
- Sanders in 2026

Profile
- Position: Running back

Personal information
- Born: May 1, 1997 (age 29); Pittsburgh, Pennsylvania, U.S.
- Listed height: 5 ft 11 in (1.80 m)
- Listed weight: 211 lb (96 kg)

Career information
- High school: Woodland Hills (Churchill, Pennsylvania)
- College: Penn State (2016–2018)
- NFL draft: 2019: 2nd round, 53rd overall pick

Career history
- Philadelphia Eagles (2019–2022); Carolina Panthers (2023–2024); Dallas Cowboys (2025)

Awards and highlights
- Pro Bowl (2022); PFWA All-Rookie Team (2019); Second-team All-Big Ten (2018)

Career NFL statistics as of 2025
- Rushing yards: 4,462
- Rushing average: 4.7
- Rushing touchdowns: 24
- Receptions: 183
- Receiving yards: 1,274
- Receiving touchdowns: 4
- Stats at Pro Football Reference

Miles Adam Sanders (born May 1, 1997), nicknamed "Boobie Miles", is an American professional football running back and kick returner. He was selected by the Philadelphia Eagles in the second round of the 2019 NFL draft after playing college football for the Penn State Nittany Lions.

He has also played for the Carolina Panthers and Dallas Cowboys.

== Early life ==
College recruiting
Name	Hometown	School	Height	Weight	40^{‡}	Commit date
Miles Sanders; RB	Pittsburgh, PA	Woodland Hills HS	5 ft 11 in (1.80 m)	199 lb (90 kg)	4.50	Jul 19, 2014
Miles Sanders; RB	Recruit ratings: Rivals: 247Sports: (85)					
Overall recruit ranking:
‡ Refers to 40-yard dash; Note: In many cases, Scout, Rivals, 247Sports, On3, and ESPN may conflict in their listings of height, weight and 40 time.; In these cases, the average was taken. ESPN grades are on a 100-point scale.; Sources: "2016 Team Ranking". Rivals.com.

Miles grew up in Swissvale, a borough nine miles east of downtown Pittsburgh, Pennsylvania, and attended local powerhouse Woodland Hills High School, where he was a three-year starter at running back. After winning Pennsylvania's Mr. Football award during his senior year and attending the Under Armour All-America Game, Sanders chose to attend Penn State over a host of other offers, including the local Pittsburgh Panthers.

== College career ==
=== 2016 season ===
Sanders saw a limited amount of playing time as a true freshman behind teammate Saquon Barkley. He received the majority of his reps on special teams this season. While returning kicks for Penn State, Sanders set the school record for kicks returned in a season (33). He is also ranked second on the program's list for kick return yards in a single season (688), averaging 20.8 yards per return.

Sanders was selected as a BTN.com All-Big Ten Conference Freshman Team honorable mention.

=== 2017 season ===
In 2017, Sanders played in 12 games, making his first college start in one of them. He started his first game against Rutgers on November 11, 2017. Sanders was presented with the 2018 Red Worrell Award, for the offensive player who best demonstrated exemplary conduct, loyalty, interest, attitude and improvement during spring practice.

=== 2018 season ===
With Barkley’s departure from Penn State after the 2017 season, Sanders was named Penn State's starting running back. Sanders started all 13 games in the 2018 season. On September 1, in his junior season debut against Appalachian State, he carried the ball 19 times, rushing for 91 yards and two touchdowns. That also included the game-winning 4-yard touchdown in overtime. After this performance, he was named the coaching staff's Offensive Player of the Week. Sanders’s most notable game of the year came against Illinois on September 21. He rushed for a career-best 200 yards on 22 carries. He also ended the game with a career-high three rushing touchdowns. He was then named the Big Ten Co-Offensive Player of the Week.

To end the season, Sanders finished No. 2 in the Big Ten and No. 15 in the nation with 1,274 rushing yards, was ranked No. 4 in the conference and No. 25 in the FBS with 98.0 rushing yards per game, and was No. 5 in the Big Ten and No. 40 in the nation with 5.79 yards per carry. Additionally, he finished seventh in the Big Ten in rushing touchdowns (9) and all-purpose yards per game (108.7). On January 3, 2019, Sanders decided to declare for the NFL draft and forgo his senior season of college football.

== Professional career ==
Pre-draft measurables
Height	Weight	Arm length	Hand span	Wingspan	40-yard dash	10-yard split	20-yard split	20-yard shuttle	Three-cone drill	Vertical jump	Broad jump	Bench press
5 ft 10 5/8 in (1.79 m)	211 lb (96 kg)	30 5/8 in (0.78 m)	9 1/4 in (0.23 m)	6 ft 2 5/8 in (1.90 m)	4.49 s	1.53 s	2.61 s	4.19 s	6.89 s	36.0 in (0.91 m)	10 ft 4 in (3.15 m)	20 reps
All values from NFL Combine

=== Philadelphia Eagles ===
==== 2019 ====
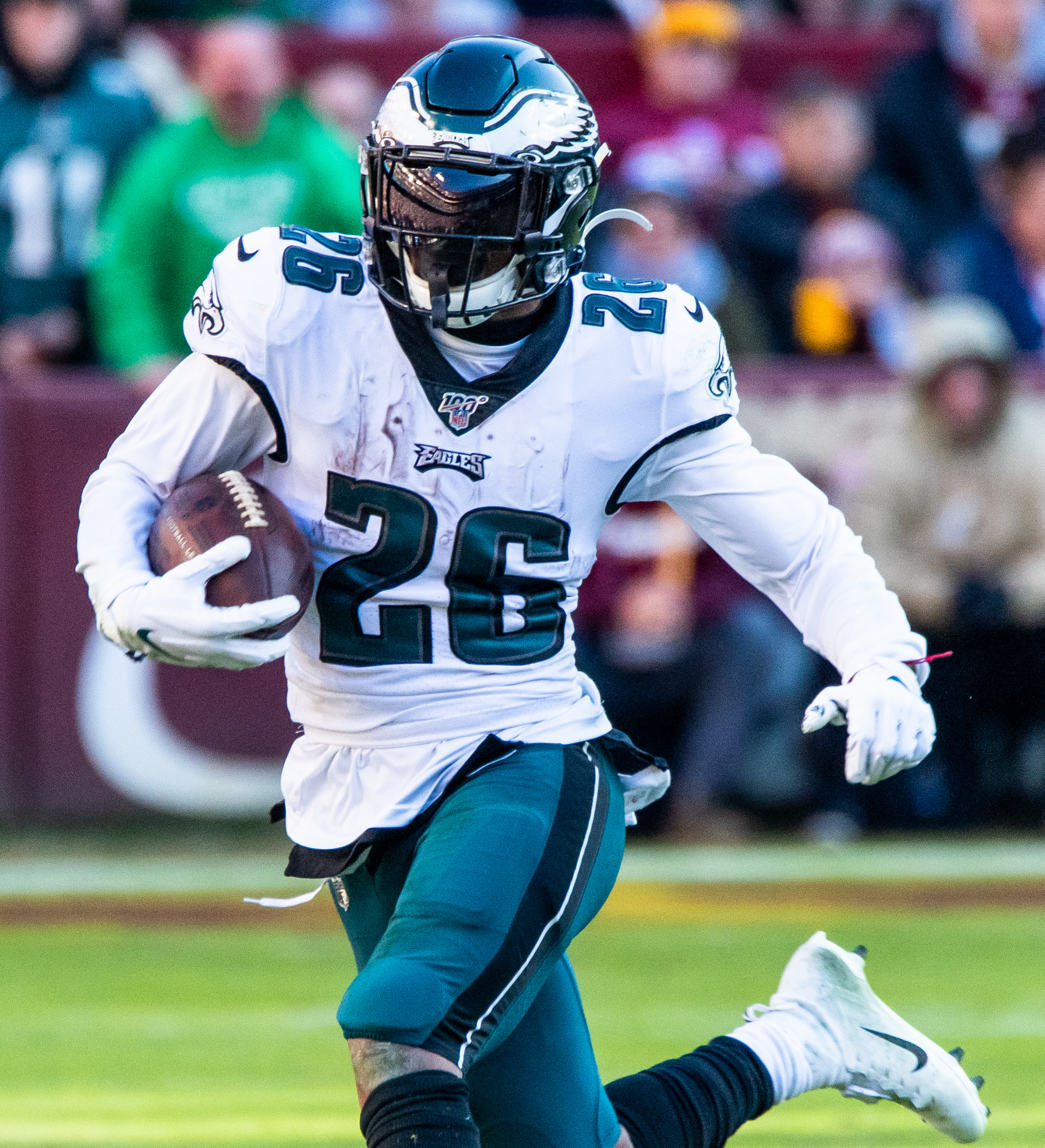
Sanders with the Eagles in 2019

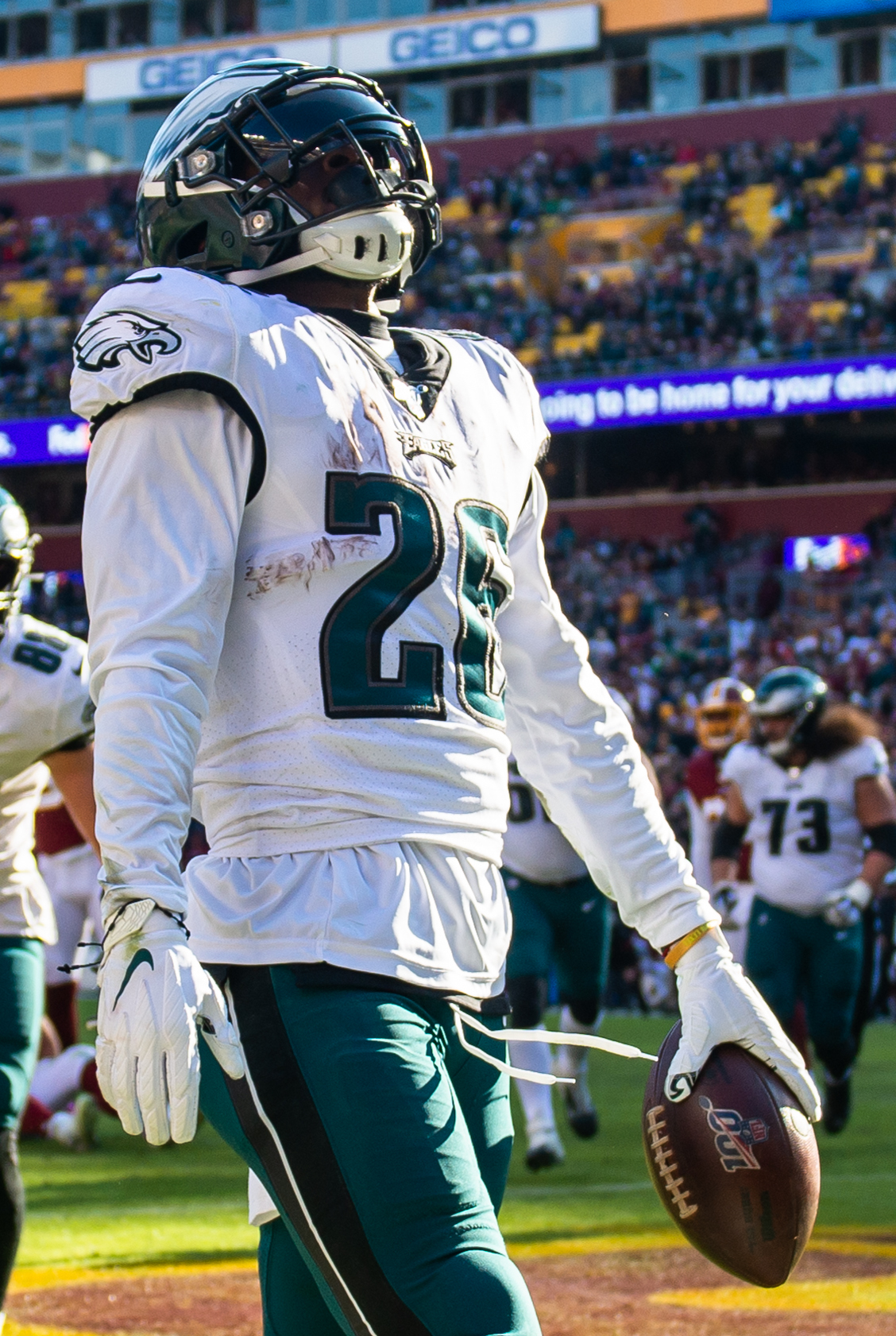
Sanders in a game against the Washington Redskins

Sanders was selected by the Philadelphia Eagles in the second round (53rd overall pick) of the 2019 NFL draft. He was represented by Beyond Athlete Management.

Sanders made his NFL debut in Week 1 against the Washington Redskins. In the game, Sanders rushed 11 times for 25 yards, and the Eagles won 32–27. In Week 6 against the Minnesota Vikings, Sanders rushed three times for six yards and caught three passes for 86 yards and a touchdown. In the Week 15 rematch against Washington, Sanders rushed 19 times for 122 yards and a touchdown and also caught six passes for 50 yards and another touchdown in a 37–27 win. During the game, Sanders passed LeSean McCoy and DeSean Jackson for the most rushing yards by a rookie and the most all-purpose yards by a rookie in franchise history, respectively. In Week 16 against the Dallas Cowboys, Sanders rushed 20 times for 79 yards and a touchdown and caught five passes for 77 yards. He finished his rookie season with 818 rushing yards and three rushing touchdowns to go along with 50 receptions for 509 receiving yards and three receiving touchdowns. He was named to the PFWA All-Rookie Team.

In the National Football Conference (NFC) Wild Card Round against the Seattle Seahawks, Sanders rushed 14 times for 69 yards in Philadelphia's 17–9 loss.

==== 2020 ====
Sanders missed the first game of the 2020 regular season with a hamstring injury. He returned in Week 2 to make his season debut against the Los Angeles Rams. In the 37–19 loss, Sanders recorded 131 scrimmage yards and a rushing touchdown. In Week 5 against his hometown team, the Pittsburgh Steelers, Sanders rushed for 80 yards and two touchdowns, including a 74-yard score, during a 38–29 loss. In Week 6 against the Baltimore Ravens, he had nine carries for 118 yards. In Week 14, against the New Orleans Saints, he had fourteen carries for 115 yards and two touchdowns, including a career-high 82-yard score, during the 24–21 win. Sanders played in 12 games in the 2020 season. He finished with 164 carries for 867 rushing yards and six rushing touchdowns to go along with 28 receptions for 197 receiving yards. Following the season, Sanders, along with Clyde Edwards-Helaire were selected to the playable Pro Bowl roster of the Madden 21 Video Game Numbers Challenge.

==== 2021 ====
While Sanders started off as the team's feature back, the offense began to focus on passing the ball more, which led to Sanders spending more time on the bench. Through the first six games, Sanders had a combined total of 57 carries for 270 yards and no touchdowns. In the team's week 7 matchup against the Las Vegas Raiders, Sanders suffered a sprained ankle. This injury forced Sanders to miss three weeks of action. He returned in time for the team's week 11 showdown with the Saints. Sanders stepped back into a large role in the week 13 game against the New York Jets, as he carried the ball a season high 24 times for 120 yards. In week 15 against the Washington Football Team, Sanders recorded a season high 131 yards rushing on 18 carries. His hot streak came to an end during the Eagles' week 16 matchup against the New York Giants, Sanders broke a bone in his hand, which forced him to miss the final two games of the regular season. In the 2021 season, Sanders recorded 137 carries for 754 rushing yards and 26 receptions for 158 yards across 12 games.

==== 2022 ====
In Week 4, Sanders ran for 134 yards and two touchdowns, helping the Eagles move to 4–0 on the season during a 29–21 win over the Jacksonville Jaguars. In Week 12, Sanders rushed for a then-season high 143 yards and two touchdowns on 21 carries in a 40–34 win over the Green Bay Packers and topped that two weeks later with 144 yards and two touchdowns on just 17 carries in a 48–22 win over the Giants. Sanders finished the 2022 season ranked among the league's top 10 in carries, rushing yards, and rushing touchdowns; his 1,269 yards were 5th most in the league, while his 259 carries and 11 touchdowns both ranked 8th.

Sanders rushed 17 times for 90 yards in the Eagles' 38–7 win over the New York Giants in the Divisional Round. In the NFC Championship Game against the San Francisco 49ers, Sanders rushed for two touchdowns in the 31–7 win. In Super Bowl LVII, Sanders had seven carries for 16 yards in the Eagles 38–35 loss to the Kansas City Chiefs.

=== Carolina Panthers ===
On March 15, 2023, Sanders signed a four-year, $25.4 million contract with the Carolina Panthers. In his debut against the Atlanta Falcons, Sanders rushed 18 times for 72 yards and lost a fumble to Falcons linebacker Lorenzo Carter late in the third quarter. The Panthers would go on to lose 24–10. Sanders's struggles continued in Week 2 against the Saints on Monday Night Football, where he ran 14 times for a meager 43 yards in the 20–17 loss. In Week 3 against the Seahawks, Sanders recorded his first touchdown of the season, on a 1-yard run. He finished the game with 9 carries for 24 yards and the touchdown, and the Panthers lost 37–27. In Week 4 against the Vikings, Sanders rushed for a season-low of 19 yards on 13 carries as the Panthers dropped to 0–4. Against the Detroit Lions in Week 5, Sanders recorded a season-low 7 carries for 32 yards. Sanders was ruled out the following week due to a shoulder injury. He would return in Week 8, where his workload drastically decreased. Against the Houston Texans, Sanders carried the ball just 2 times for 0 yards. Sanders would then rush 6 times for 39 yards against the Indianapolis Colts, before posting a career-worst performance with just 2 carries for −5 yards against the Chicago Bears on Thursday Night Football. In the following two weeks, Sanders saw his workload increase to 11 carries and then 15 carries against the Cowboys and Tennessee Titans respectively. In Week 14 against the New Orleans Saints, Sanders turned in a season-high 74 rushing yards on 10 carries in the 28–6 loss.

Sanders would go on to finish the season with career lows in carries, yards, and yards per carry.

In the 2024 season, Sanders had 55 carries for 205 rushing yards and two rushing touchdowns to go with 24 receptions for 148 receiving yards and one receiving touchdown. He missed six games on the season with an ankle injury. The Panthers released Sanders on March 11, 2025.

=== Dallas Cowboys ===
On March 14, 2025, Sanders signed a one-year contract with the Dallas Cowboys. He was a backup behind Javonte Williams and appeared in the first four games of the season. In Week 1, Sanders recorded a 49-yard run against his former team, the Philadelphia Eagles, and was tackled at the 11-yard line, but had a costly red zone fumble on first down. After a couple of personal foul penalties by both teams, the contest was delayed for 65 minutes due to a lightning storm and Sanders didn't receive another carry in the 20-24 loss. In Week 4, he left the game in the second quarter against the Green Bay Packers with an ankle injury. In Week 5, Sanders was declared inactive with ankle and knee injuries against the New York Jets, while being replaced with rookie Jaydon Blue. On October 10, he was placed on injured reserve with a season-ending left knee injury, which required surgery. Sanders finished the season with 20 carries for 117 yards, one rushing touchdown and 8 receptions for 30 yards.

== Personal life ==
On June 8, 2026, Sanders was arrested in Churchill, Pennsylvania on charges of driving under the influence and careless driving.

== Career statistics ==
=== NFL ===
Legend
**Bold**	Career high

==== Regular season ====
Year	Team	Games		Rushing					Receiving					Fumbles	
Year	Team	GP	GS	Att	Yds	Avg	Lng	TD	Rec	Yds	Avg	Lng	TD	Fum	Lost
2019	PHI	16	11	179	818	4.6	65	3	**50**	**509**	**10.2**	**45**	**3**	2	1
2020	PHI	12	11	164	867	5.3	**82**	6	28	197	7.0	28	0	**4**	**2**
2021	PHI	12	12	137	754	5.5	38	0	26	158	6.1	25	0	1	1
2022	PHI	**17**	**15**	**259**	**1,269**	4.9	40	**11**	20	78	3.9	16	0	2	**2**
2023	CAR	16	5	129	432	3.3	48	1	27	154	5.7	14	0	2	**2**
2024	CAR	11	2	55	205	3.7	26	2	24	148	6.2	33	1	1	0
2025	DAL	4	0	20	117	**5.9**	49	1	8	30	3.8	9	0	1	1
Career		88	56	943	4,462	4.7	82	24	183	1,274	4.6	45	4	14	10

==== Postseason ====
Year	Team	Games		Rushing					Receiving					Fumbles	
Year	Team	GP	GS	Att	Yds	Avg	Lng	TD	Rec	Yds	Avg	Lng	TD	Fum	Lost
2019	PHI	1	1	14	69	**4.9**	**18**	0	**3**	8	2.7	**7**	0	0	0
2021	PHI	1	1	7	16	2.3	14	0	**3**	**12**	**4.0**	6	0	0	0
2022	PHI	**3**	**3**	**35**	**148**	4.2	**18**	**2**	1	3	3.0	3	0	0	0
Career		5	5	56	233	4.2	18	2	7	23	3.3	7	0	0	0

=== College ===
Season	Team	GP	Rushing					Receiving					Kickoff Return				
Season	Team	GP	Att	Yds	Avg	Lng	TD	Rec	Yds	Avg	Lng	TD	Ret	Yds	Avg	Lng	TD
2016	Penn State	13	25	184	7.4	57	1	2	24	12.0	21	1	33	688	20.8	48	0
2017	Penn State	12	31	191	6.2	31	2	6	30	5.0	7	0	5	76	15.2	23	0
2018	Penn State	13	220	1,274	5.8	78	9	24	139	5.8	29	0	0	0	0.0	0	0
Career		37	276	1,649	6.0	78	12	32	193	6.0	29	1	38	764	20.1	48	0

== Career highlights ==
=== Awards and honors ===
NFL

- Pro Bowl (2022)
- PFWA All-Rookie Team (2019)

College

- BTN.com All-Big Ten Freshman Team honorable mention
- 2018 Red Worrell Award
- Selected second-team All-Big Ten by the league's coaches and media
- Second-team All-Big Ten honors by Associated Press
- Penn State Most Valuable Offensive Player
- Big Ten Offensive Player of the Week after Illinois (9/21) game
- Member of the Maxwell Award Watch List
- Preseason watch list for the Doak Walker Award, given to the nation's top running back

=== Philadelphia Eagles franchise records ===
- Most rushing yards by a rookie (818)
- Most yards from scrimmage by a rookie (1,327)
- Most all-purpose yards by a rookie (1,641)
