= Alex Guminski =

American sports agent and attorney

- Born: Alexander F. Guminski; Pittsburgh, Pennsylvania, U.S.
- Education: University of Pittsburgh; University of Pittsburgh School of Law (JD)
- Occupations: Sports agent (NFL, CFL, FIBA, NIL); Attorney
- Years active: 2016–present (sports agent); 2013–present (attorney)
- Employer(s): PRO ZONE: The Agency; Guminski Law, P.C.
- Website: prozonetheagency.com

Alexander F. Guminski (commonly known as Alex Guminski) is an American sports agent and attorney. He is the Founder and President of PRO ZONE: The Agency, a Pittsburgh-based sports agency specializing in National Football League (NFL), Canadian Football League (CFL), and National Collegiate Athletic Association (NCAA) Name, Image, and Likeness (NIL) contract negotiation and marketing representation. He is also the founder of Guminski Law, P.C. in Pittsburgh, Pennsylvania. He is best known for negotiating the largest CFL player contract for an American running back in over 15 years when Guminski finalized the contract of his client, Ka'Deem Carey, with the Calgary Stampeders in January 2022.

== Education ==
Guminski grew up in Pittsburgh and attended two high schools, Woodland Hills and Central Catholic, from where he ultimately graduated in 2003. Guminski attended the University of Pittsburgh for both his undergraduate and law school studies. After graduating from the University of Pittsburgh School of Law with a Juris Doctor degree, he earned admission to the Pennsylvania Bar and District of Columbia Court of Appeals in November 2013 and November 2014, respectively.

== Career ==
=== Guminski Law, P.C. ===
His law firm, Guminski Law, specializes in those specific areas of the law that tie into the likelihood of a professional athlete could one day require, including business, intellectual property, employment, real estate, estate law, and criminal defense. Upon passing the NFL Players Association (NFLPA) Contract Advisor Exam in July 2016, he developed SLG Sports & Entertainment as a division of the Sommer Law Group. In 2019, he left Sommer to open his own law firm, Guminski Law, P.C., and his own sports agency, PRO ZONE: The Agency, both of which he currently operates in Pittsburgh.

=== PRO ZONE: The Agency ===
In 2016, Guminski became an NFLPA Certified Contact Advisor. Earlier that year, he also became a CFL Players Association (CFLPA) Certified Contract Advisor. [CFLPA] To date, he has represented and serviced more than 30 NFL, CFL, and NCAA athletes on matters related to their playing, marketing, and post-playing career.

In 2019, he founded his own sports agency, PRO ZONE: The Agency, which is based in Pittsburgh, that he operates as the agency's President. According to the NFLPA, his services as an agent and contract advisor include contract negotiation; endorsements; marketing; public relations; post-career counseling; and referrals for financial services and tax advice. Key additional PRO ZONE personnel include Director of Player Personnel and Community Affairs, Chad Gaffney, and Director of Player Development and Post-Career Strategy, Nolan Carroll II. Carroll, a retired 8-year NFL cornerback, was one of Guminski's first professional football clients.

Guminski first garnered media attention in April 2020, as the onset of the COVID-19 pandemic resulted in the cancellation of “pro days” across the United States for NFL and CFL draft prospects. Among these cancellations was that of the University of Pittsburgh Panthers football program, in which one of Guminski's clients and Panthers wide receiver, Aaron Mathews, had been set to participate. In an effort to mitigate the negative effects of the pandemic and to showcase Mathews’ talent, and the talent of several of Guminski's other clients, as well as numerous other local draft prospects, to professional teams, Guminski organized and contributed to the facilitation of an unofficial pro day for these athletes at the 424 Factory and a local practice field in Pittsburgh. The pro day, which implemented health and safety protocols and separated athletes into small socially distanced groups, was video recorded and the tape of which then disseminated to the agents of participating athletes and all professional teams. The pro day was successfully executed, both in its ability to provide a showcase platform for its participants and its ability to prevent the contraction of COVID-19 among any of its participants or facilitators.

Following the pro day, Guminski appeared on KDKA-FM 93.7 The Fan's The Hotline radio show, hosted by Paul Zeise, to discuss the pro day's organization and execution, as well as the broader effects of the COVID-19 pandemic on the NFL's operations, 2020 off-season and season schedule, draft prospects, and veteran players, as well as the operations of NFL and CFL agents.

In January 2022, on the eve of the free agent period set to begin in the CFL, Guminski finalized the negotiation of a two-year contract extension on behalf of his client and former Chicago Bears running back, Ka’Deem Carey, with the Calgary Stampeders for the 2022 and 2023 CFL seasons. The contract became the subject of significant media attention as it signified the highest base salary, the highest average annual value, and the highest total contract value for an American running back in the CFL in over 15 years since Ricky Williams signed a one-year, $340,000 deal with the Toronto Argonauts in 2006. Prior to signing the extension on January 31, 2022, Carey, who was set to become a free agent on February 8, was considered a top-25 CFL free agent, and the #1 free agent running back, after rushing for the most touchdowns, and logging the second-most carries, the second-most rushing yards, and the third-most yards per carry among qualified running backs in the league in 2021.

Guminski has assisted his collegiate clients in navigating the NCAA's recently changed NIL rules to facilitate personal branding and charitable initiatives, such as the organization and execution of Buffalo Bulls running back Dylan McDuffie’s December 2021 Holiday Toy Drive in collaboration with the Boys & Girls Club of Buffalo. He has also supported his professional clients’ charitable initiatives, including Seattle Seahawk Niles Scott’s Annual Youth Football Camp at Elkton High School in Elkton, Maryland.

== Notable clients ==
Professional football clients of Guminski and PRO ZONE include:

- Darjarri "DJ" Coleman - Outside Linebacker for the Jacksonville Jaguars.
- David Amerson – Retired 7-year NFL Cornerback. Played with the Oakland Raiders, Washington Redskins, Kansas City Chiefs and Atlanta Falcons.
- Nolan Carroll - Retired 8-year NFL Cornerback. Played with the Miami Dolphins, Philadelphia Eagles and Dallas Cowboys.
- Ka’Deem Carey – CFL Running Back Toronto Argonauts Calgary Stampeders. Previously with the NFL Chicago Bears.
- Niles Scott – 5-year veteran currently playing for the UFL nose tackle for the DC Defenders. Previously with the NFL Seattle Seahawks, Buffalo Bills, Las Vegas Raiders, Miami Dolphins, San Francisco 49ers, Tennessee Titans, Denver Broncos and Cincinnati Bengals.
- Devin Gray – 5-year veteran currently playing in the UFL wide receiver for the Michigan Panthers, previously with the NFL Baltimore Ravens, Kansas City Chiefs and Atlanta Falcons.
- Willie Yarbary – Veteran nose tackle in the UFL Birmingham Stallions. Previously a member of the NFL Los Angeles Chargers.
- Tyrique McGhee – CFL Cornerback for the Winnipeg Blue Bombers. Previously a member of the Los Angeles Rams.
- Frankie Griffin - CFL Linebacker for the Ottawa Redblacks.
- Shabari Davis - CFL Cornerback for the Hamilton Tigercats.
- Azeem Victor – NFL free agent linebacker, most recently with the Seattle Seahawks.
- Tyson Graham – Retired NFL and CFL safety, most recently with the Indianapolis Colts and Pittsburgh Maulers.
- Paul Butler – Retired NFL tight end, most recently of the New England Patriots.
- Jacub Panasiuk – Retired NFL Defensive End Defensive endWashington Commanders from Michigan State.
- Kirk Christodoulou – Retired Punter for the NFL New York Giants.
- Luca Crusifino – WWE NXT Professional Wrestler.

Collegiate and High School NIL athlete clients of Guminski and PRO ZONE include:

- Tyreak Sapp - Florida Gators Defensive End.
- Jeremy Crawshaw - Florida Gators Punter.
- Sirvocea Dennis - Pittsburgh Panthers Linebacker.
- MJ Devonshire - Pittsburgh Panthers Cornerback.
- Tiqwai Hayes - Aliquippa Running Back.
- Dylan McDuffie – Buffalo Bulls Running Back.
- Matthew Trickett – Minnesota Golden Gophers placekicker.

== Other work ==
Guminski has been extensively involved in the American-Hellenic Educational and Progressive Association (AHEPA), a philanthropic fraternal organization whose mission is centered in community service and civic responsibility with the promotion of Greek culture.
