= Quinton Jefferson =

American football player (born 1993)

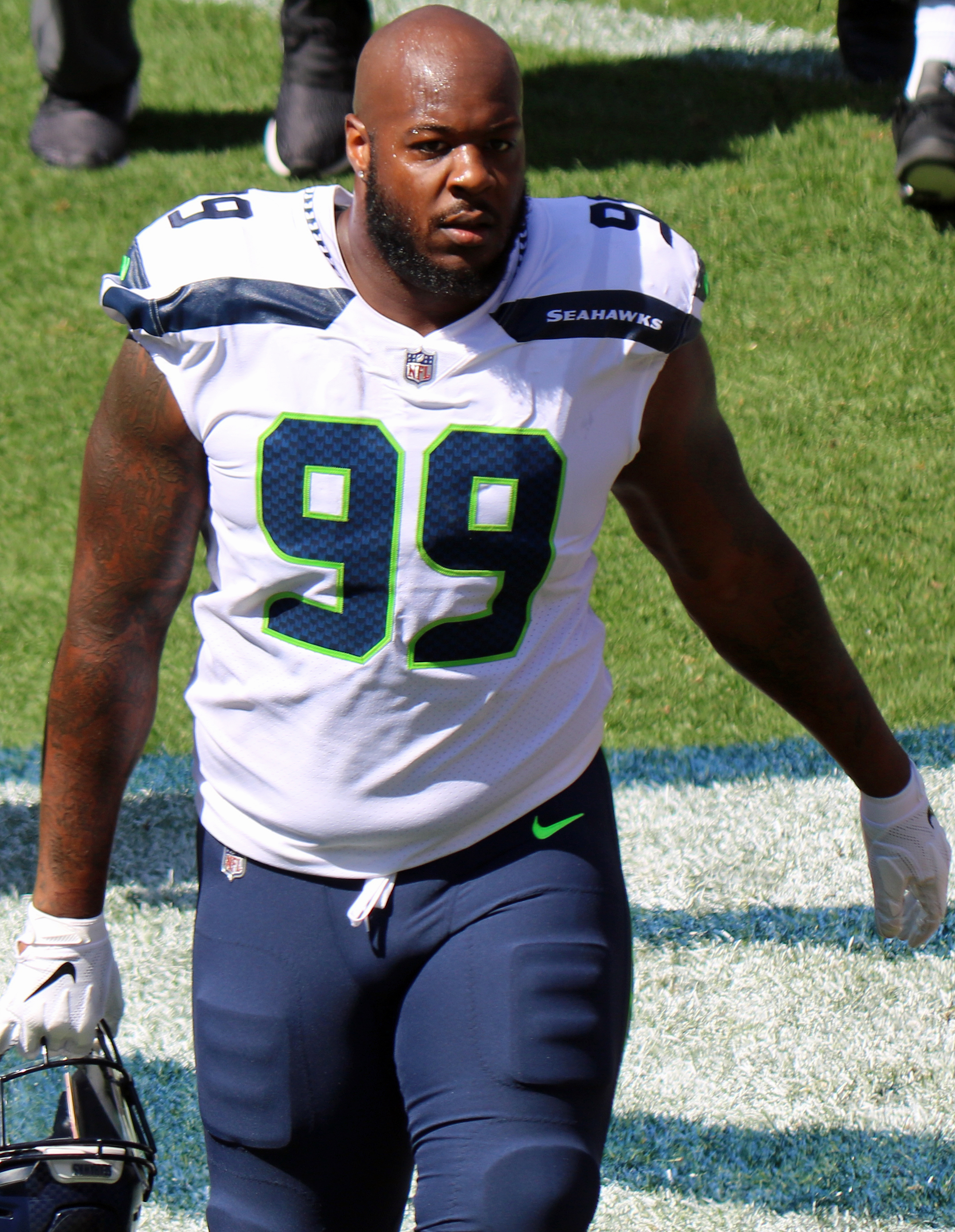
- Jefferson with the Seattle Seahawks in 2018

Profile
- Position: Defensive tackle

Personal information
- Born: March 31, 1993 (age 33); Pittsburgh, Pennsylvania, U.S.
- Listed height: 6 ft 4 in (1.93 m)
- Listed weight: 291 lb (132 kg)

Career information
- High school: Woodland Hills (Churchill, Pennsylvania)
- College: Maryland (2011–2015)
- NFL draft: 2016: 5th round, 147th overall pick

Career history
- Seattle Seahawks (2016); Los Angeles Rams (2017); Seattle Seahawks (2017–2019); Buffalo Bills (2020); Las Vegas Raiders (2021); Seattle Seahawks (2022); New York Jets (2023); Cleveland Browns (2024); Buffalo Bills (2024); Detroit Lions (2025)

Career NFL statistics as of 2025
- Total tackles: 206
- Sacks: 28.5
- Forced fumbles: 4
- Fumble recoveries: 4
- Pass deflections: 9
- Stats at Pro Football Reference

Quinton Jefferson (born March 31, 1993) is an American professional football defensive tackle. He was selected by the Seattle Seahawks in the fifth round of the 2016 NFL draft. He played college football for the Maryland Terrapins. He played for the Seahawks from 2016 to 2019, as well as brief stints for the Los Angeles Rams, Buffalo Bills, Las Vegas Raiders, and the New York Jets. Jefferson has played for the Seahawks three separate times. In 2024, Jefferson signed a one-year deal with the Cleveland Browns, before being released mid-season and signing with the Bills again for the remainder of the season.

== Early life ==
Quinton Jefferson was born to Larry and Bahiyyah Jefferson in Pittsburgh, Pennsylvania. Jefferson attended Woodland Hills High School in Pittsburgh, Pennsylvania, where he played both football and basketball.

== College career ==
Jefferson verbally committed to Maryland on January 24, 2011, and signed on February 2. In the 2015 season, Jefferson had 12.5 tackles for loss, 6.5 sacks, one interception, one pass defended, one forced fumble, and one fumble recovery. Jefferson played all four years with the Terrapins, playing in 37 games over that span.

== Professional career ==
Pre-draft measurables
Height	Weight	Arm length	Hand span	40-yard dash	10-yard split	20-yard split	20-yard shuttle	Three-cone drill	Vertical jump	Bench press
6 ft 3 7/8 in (1.93 m)	291 lb (132 kg)	33 3/8 in (0.85 m)	8 7/8 in (0.23 m)	4.95 s	1.70 s	2.83 s	4.37 s	7.95 s	29.0 in (0.74 m)	24 reps
All values from NFL Combine

=== Seattle Seahawks (first stint) ===
Jefferson was selected in the fifth round of the 2016 NFL draft with the 147th overall selection by the Seattle Seahawks. The team swapped seventh round picks with the New England Patriots while giving them a fourth round pick in the 2017 NFL draft in order to move up to #147 in order to select Jefferson. On May 6, 2016, the Seahawks announced that they had signed Jefferson to his rookie contract. He was placed on injured reserve on October 25, 2016, after suffering a knee injury. He appeared in three games as a rookie in the 2016 season.

On September 2, 2017, Jefferson was waived by the Seahawks.

=== Los Angeles Rams ===
On September 3, 2017, Jefferson was claimed off waivers by the Los Angeles Rams. He was inactive for the Rams' Week 1 game. He was waived on September 12, 2017, and was re-signed to the practice squad.

=== Seattle Seahawks (second stint) ===
On October 2, 2017, Jefferson was signed by the Seahawks off the Rams' practice squad. In Week 14 of the 2017 season, Jefferson was ejected for being involved in a scuffle with some players on the Jacksonville Jaguars. As he was leaving the field, some Jacksonville fans threw drinks at him. Jefferson attempted to climb into the stands in an effort to attack the fans, but was restrained by a team official. In the 2017 season, he appeared in six games and had one sack.

In the 2018 season, Jefferson had three sacks, 25 total tackles (15 solo), two passes defended, and one fumble recovery in 16 games and 12 starts.

In Week 1 of the 2019 season against the Cincinnati Bengals, Jefferson recorded six tackles and sacked Andy Dalton twice in the 21–20 win. In the 2019 season, he appeared in 14 games and started 12 games. He finished with 3.5 sacks, 26 total tackles (14 solo), three passes defended, and one fumble recovery. He had two sacks in the Seahawks' Wild Card Round victory over the Philadelphia Eagles.

=== Buffalo Bills (first stint) ===
On March 26, 2020, Jefferson signed a two-year contract with the Buffalo Bills. In Week 4 against the Las Vegas Raiders, Jefferson recorded his first career forced fumble, a strip sack on Derek Carr which he recovered himself, during the 30–23 win. In the 2016 season, he appeared in all 16 games and started four. He finished with three sacks, 23 total tackles (14 solo), one pass defended, one forced fumble, and one fumble recovery.

Jefferson was released by the Bills after the season on March 10, 2021.

=== Las Vegas Raiders ===
Jefferson signed with the Raiders on a one-year deal on March 17, 2021. In the 2021 season, Jefferson started in all 17 games. He finished with 4.5 sacks, 47 total tackles (17 solo), one pass defended, and two forced fumbles. He had a sack in the Raiders' Wild Card Round loss to the Cincinnati Bengals.

=== Seattle Seahawks (third stint) ===
Jefferson signed with the Seahawks on March 21, 2022. He played in 17 games with three starts, recording 29 tackles, two passes defensed, and a career-high 5.5 sacks.

On March 14, 2023, Jefferson was released by the Seahawks.

=== New York Jets ===
On April 7, 2023, Jefferson signed with the New York Jets. He was named a starting defensive tackle, starting 14 games and recording 34 tackles and a career-high six sacks.

=== Cleveland Browns ===
On March 19, 2024, Jefferson signed a one-year deal with the Cleveland Browns. He was released from the team on November 5, 2024.

=== Buffalo Bills (second stint) ===
On November 6, 2024, Jefferson was signed by the Buffalo Bills.

=== Detroit Lions ===
On September 24, 2025, Jefferson signed with the Detroit Lions' practice squad. He was signed to the active roster on October 11. Jefferson was released by the Lions on November 25.

== Statistics ==
Pre-draft measurables
Height	Weight	Arm length	Hand span	40-yard dash	10-yard split	20-yard split	20-yard shuttle	Three-cone drill	Vertical jump	Bench press
6 ft 3 7/8 in (1.93 m)	291 lb (132 kg)	33 3/8 in (0.85 m)	8 7/8 in (0.23 m)	4.95 s	1.70 s	2.83 s	4.37 s	7.95 s	29.0 in (0.74 m)	24 reps
All values from NFL Combine

Career statistics
Year	Team	G	GS	Tackles					Interceptions						Fumbles	
Year	Team	G	GS	Total	Solo	Ast	Sck	SFTY	PDef	Int	Yds	Avg	Lng	TDs	FF	FR
Regular season
2016	SEA	3	0	1	0	1	0.0	0	0	0	0	0.0	0	0	0	0
2017	SEA	6	0	7	6	1	1.0	0	0	0	0	0.0	0	0	0	0
2018	SEA	16	12	25	15	10	3.0	0	2	0	0	0.0	0	0	0	1
2019	SEA	14	12	26	14	12	3.5	0	3	0	0	0.0	0	0	0	1
2020	BUF	16	4	23	14	9	3.0	0	1	0	0	0.0	0	0	1	1
2021	LVR	17	17	47	17	30	4.5	0	1	0	0	0.0	0	0	2	0
2022	SEA	17	3	29	17	12	5.5	0	2	0	0	0.0	0	0	0	0
2023	NYJ	14	14	34	13	21	6.0	0	0	0	0	0.0	0	0	1	1
Total		103	62	192	96	96	26.5	0	9	0	0	0.0	0	0	4	4
Playoffs
2018	SEA	1	1	2	1	1	0.0	0	0	0	0	0.0	0	0	0	0
2019	SEA	2	2	2	2	0	2.0	0	0	0	0	0.0	0	0	0	0
2020	BUF	3	0	5	1	4	0.0	0	0	0	0	0.0	0	0	0	0
2021	LVR	1	1	3	1	2	1.0	0	0	0	0	0.0	0	0	0	0
2022	SEA	1	0	1	1	0	0.0	0	0	0	0	0.0	0	0	0	0
Total		8	4	13	6	7	3.0	0	0	0	0	0.0	0	0	0	0

== Personal life ==
Jefferson graduated in December 2015 from the University of Maryland with a degree in family science.

Jefferson is married to Nadia Jefferson and has four children. The oldest three children are daughters, with the youngest two girls being twins, and the youngest child is a boy.
