= Terrence Johnson (American football) =

American football player (born 1986)

No. 23, 30, 22
- Position: Cornerback

Personal information
- Born: July 5, 1986 (age 40); Braddock, Pennsylvania, U.S.
- Listed height: 5 ft 9 in (1.75 m)
- Listed weight: 195 lb (88 kg)

Career information
- High school: Woodland Hills (PA)
- College: California (PA)
- NFL draft: 2010: undrafted

Career history
- New England Patriots (2010)*; Indianapolis Colts (2010–2011); Atlanta Falcons (2012); Los Angeles KISS (2014–2015)
- * Offseason or practice squad member only

Career NFL statistics
- Total tackles: 37
- Stats at Pro Football Reference

Career AFL statistics
- Total tackles: 17
- Stats at ArenaFan.com

Terrence Johnson (born July 5, 1986) is an American former professional football player who was a cornerback in the National Football League (NFL). He played college football for the California Vulcans. Johnson graduated from Woodland Hills High School outside of Pittsburgh, Pennsylvania. He is one of the many players to reach the NFL from coach George Novak's football program at Woodland Hills.

== Professional career ==
=== New England Patriots ===
After going undrafted in the 2010 NFL draft, Johnson signed with the New England Patriots as an undrafted free agent on April 29, 2010. He was waived on August 23, 2010. He was re-signed on August 29 and cut two days later.

=== Indianapolis Colts ===
Johnson was signed to the Indianapolis Colts' practice squad on December 23, 2010. He was signed to a future contract on January 10, 2011.

=== Atlanta Falcons ===
On September 11, 2012, the Atlanta Falcons signed Johnson to a contract. He was released on August 30, 2013.

=== Los Angeles KISS ===
On July 1, 2014, Johnson was assigned to the Los Angeles KISS of the Arena Football League (AFL).
