= East Pittsburgh, Pennsylvania =

Borough in Pennsylvania, US

- Borough
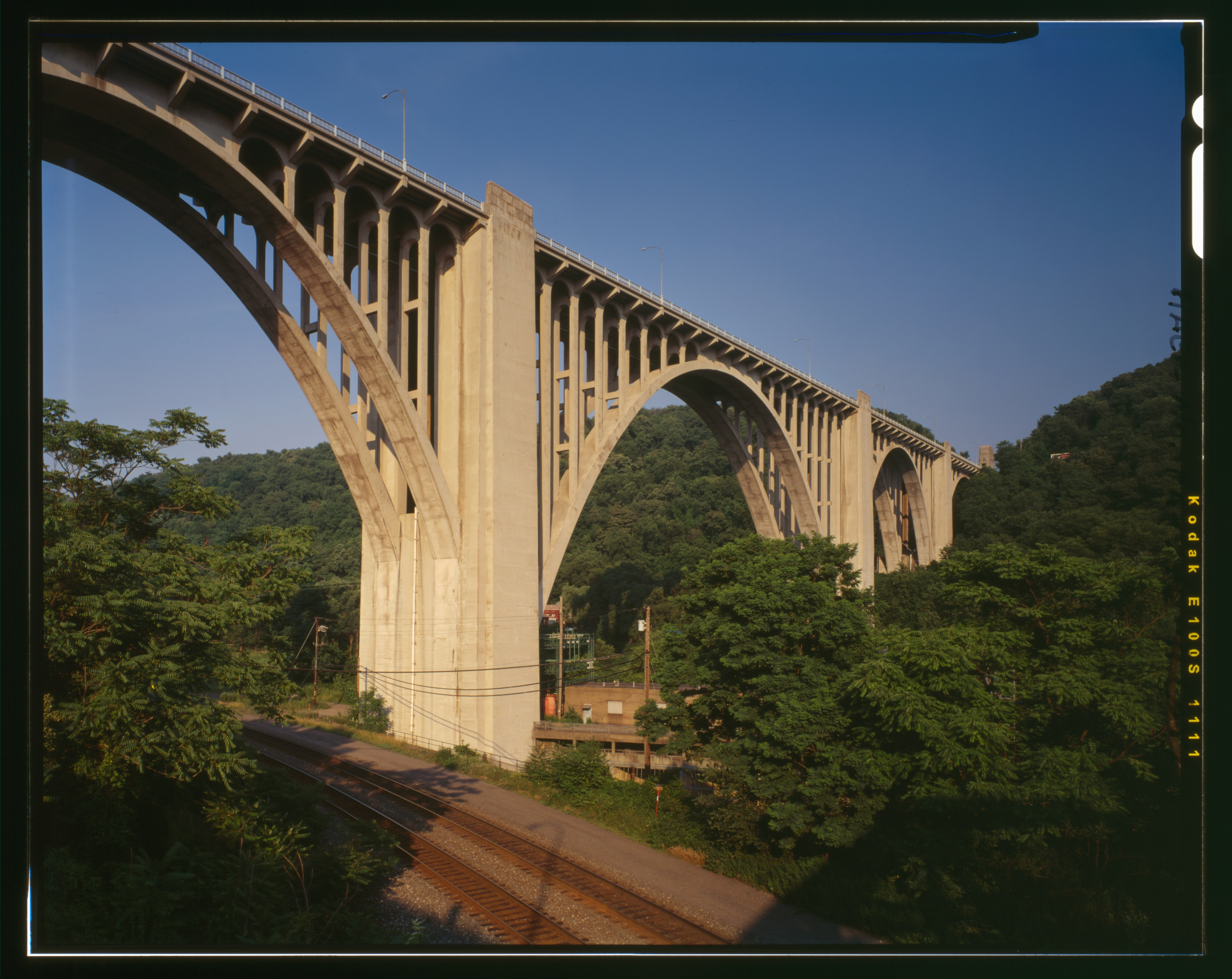
- George Westinghouse Memorial Bridge

- Location in Allegheny County and the U.S. state of Pennsylvania.
- Coordinates: 40°23′49″N 79°50′24″W
- Country: United States
- State: Pennsylvania
- County: Allegheny

Government
  - Type: Borough Council
  - Mayor: Markus Adams
  - Council President: Mary Carol Kennedy

Area
  - Total: 0.39 sq mi (1.00 km^{2})
  - Land: 0.39 sq mi (1.00 km^{2})
  - Water: 0 sq mi (0.00 km^{2})

Population (2020)
  - Total: 1,927
  - Density: 4,971.7/sq mi (1,919.58/km^{2})
- Time zone: UTC-5 (Eastern (EST))
  - Summer (DST): UTC-4 (EDT)
- ZIP code: 15112
- Area code: 412
- FIPS code: 42-21712
- Website: eastpittsburghboro.com

East Pittsburgh is a borough in Allegheny County, Pennsylvania, United States, approximately 11 miles (18 km) southeast of the confluence of the Monongahela and the Allegheny rivers at Pittsburgh. The population in 1900 stood at 2,883, and in 1910, at 5,615. As of the 2020 census, the borough population was 1,927, having fallen from 6,079 in 1940. George Westinghouse erected large works there which supplied equipment to the great power plants at Niagara Falls and for the elevated and rapid-transit systems of New York City. Nearby, the George Westinghouse Bridge over Turtle Creek is a prominent fixture in the area, which is very near the borough of Braddock.

== History ==
The first transmission from pioneering radio station KDKA (AM) was made from East Pittsburgh on November 2, 1920.

In 1928, an early demonstration of a new broadcast medium was conducted at the Westinghouse laboratories in East Pittsburgh. Eventually, the new medium became known as television. Vladimir Zworykin worked for Westinghouse Electric Corporation at that time. He lived in the borough of Wilkinsburg. The Westinghouse Works became the Research and Business Park "Keystone Commons" in 1989.

The East Pittsburgh School District included Bessemer Avenue Elementary School and East Pittsburgh Junior/Senior High School on Howard Street. East Pittsburgh's school colors were green and white, and its athletic teams were called the Shamrocks.

During the 1970–71 school year, the East Pittsburgh School District was merged, by court order, with the neighboring Turtle Creek School District for the following year. In the final basketball game between the two rivals, the Shamrocks defeated Turtle Creek, 65–63.

== Government and politics ==
Presidential elections results
Year	Republican	Democratic	Third parties
2024	21% 140	77% 510	1% 9
2020	20% 152	78% 581	1% 9
2016	21% 155	77% 578	2% 14
2012	20% 147	79% 597	1% 8

== Geography ==
East Pittsburgh is located at 40°23′49″N 79°50′24″W (40.396969, -79.839869). The borough is about 3 miles (4.8 km) outside of the easternmost city limits of Pittsburgh and about 10 miles (16 km) from city hall in Pittsburgh.

According to the United States Census Bureau, the borough has a total area of 0.4 square miles (1.0 km^{2}), all land.

== Surrounding and adjacent neighborhoods ==
East Pittsburgh has four borders, including Chalfant to the north, Turtle Creek to the northeast, North Versailles Township (via the Westinghouse Bridge or East Pittsburgh–McKeesport Blvd. Bridge) from the east to the southwest, and North Braddock to the west and northwest.

== Demographics ==
Historical population
Census	Pop.	Note	%±
1900	2,883		—
1910	5,615		94.8%
1920	6,527		16.2%
1930	6,214		−4.8%
1940	6,079		−2.2%
1950	5,259		−13.5%
1960	4,122		−21.6%
1970	3,006		−27.1%
1980	2,493		−17.1%
1990	2,160		−13.4%
2000	2,017		−6.6%
2010	1,822		−9.7%
2020	1,927		5.8%

As of the 2000 census, there were 2,017 people, 936 households, and 496 families residing in the borough. The population density was 5,163.5 inhabitants per square mile (1,993.6/km^{2}). There were 1,107 housing units at an average density of 2,833.9 per square mile (1,094.2/km^{2}). The racial makeup of the borough was 76.10% White, 20.92% African American, 0.35% Native American, 0.10% Asian, 0.05% Pacific Islander, 0.30% from other races, and 2.18% from two or more races. Hispanic or Latino of any race were 0.50% of the population.

There were 936 households, out of which 28.2% had children under the age of 18 living with them, 27.7% were married couples living together, 21.8% had a female householder with no husband present, and 47.0% were non-families. 43.7% of all households were made up of individuals, and 18.5% had someone living alone who was 65 years of age or older. The average household size was 2.14 and the average family size was 2.97.

In the borough the population was spread out, with 25.7% under the age of 18, 6.8% from 18 to 24, 29.6% from 25 to 44, 20.1% from 45 to 64, and 17.8% who were 65 years of age or older. The median age was 37 years. For every 100 females, there were 78.7 males. For every 100 females age 18 and over, there were 72.3 males.

The median income for a household in the borough was $21,286, and the median income for a family was $32,037. Males had a median income of $26,512 versus $23,050 for females. The per capita income for the borough was $13,391. About 17.5% of families and 22.0% of the population were below the poverty line, including 34.0% of those under age 18 and 10.2% of those age 65 or over.

== Notable people ==
- Milton Katselas, stage and film director
- Abby Mann (1927–2008), film writer and producer
- Nathan Thomas Velar (1858–1928) elected official, postmaster
- Joseph Wambaugh (1937-2025), novelist

== See also ==
- Shooting of Antwon Rose Jr.
