= Shawntae Spencer =

American football player (born 1982)

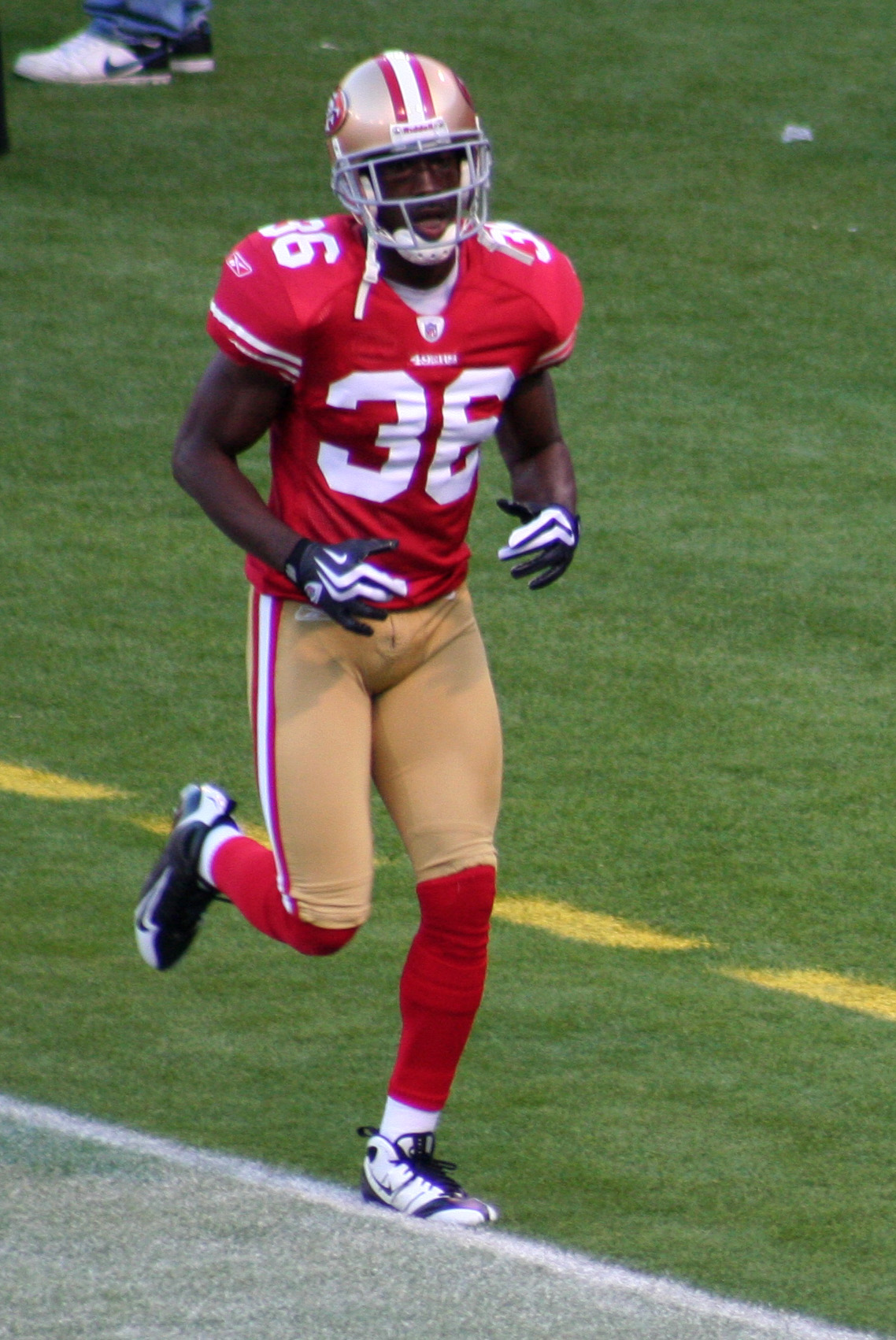
- Spencer with the San Francisco 49ers in 2009

No. 36
- Position: Cornerback

Personal information
- Born: February 22, 1982 (age 44); Rankin, Pennsylvania, U.S.
- Listed height: 6 ft 0 in (1.83 m)
- Listed weight: 190 lb (86 kg)

Career information
- High school: Woodland Hills (Pittsburgh, Pennsylvania)
- College: Pittsburgh
- NFL draft: 2004: 2nd round, 58th overall pick

Career history
- San Francisco 49ers (2004–2011); Oakland Raiders (2012)

Career NFL statistics
- Total tackles: 347
- Sacks: 2.5
- Forced fumbles: 3
- Fumble recoveries: 3
- Interceptions: 11
- Defensive touchdowns: 1
- Stats at Pro Football Reference

Shawntae Spencer (born February 22, 1982) is an American former professional football player who was a cornerback in the National Football League (NFL). He played college football for the Pittsburgh Panthers and was selected by the San Francisco 49ers in the second round of the 2004 NFL draft.

== Early life and college career ==
He played college football for the Pittsburgh Panthers and graduated from Woodland Hills High School.

== Professional career ==
=== San Francisco 49ers ===
Spencer was selected by the San Francisco 49ers in the second round of the 2004 NFL draft with the 58th overall pick. He played for the team from 2004 to 2011 and started 72 of 98 games. He recorded 347 tackles, 11 interceptions and 2.5 sacks. He was the 49ers selection for the Ed Block Courage Award in 2009. The 49ers released him on March 15, 2012.

=== Oakland Raiders ===
Spencer signed with the Oakland Raiders on March 19, 2012.

== NFL career statistics ==
Legend
**Bold**	Career high

Year	Team	Games		Tackles					Interceptions					Fumbles			
Year	Team	GP	GS	Cmb	Solo	Ast	Sck	TFL	Int	Yds	TD	Lng	PD	FF	FR	Yds	TD
2004	SFO	**16**	12	70	61	**9**	0.0	**2**	0	0	0	0	7	0	0	0	0
2005	SFO	15	14	**83**	**74**	**9**	0.0	**2**	**4**	**85**	**1**	**61**	**19**	0	0	0	0
2006	SFO	13	13	61	53	8	**2.0**	**2**	1	0	0	0	9	**2**	**2**	**11**	0
2007	SFO	11	1	28	25	3	0.0	0	1	0	0	0	3	0	0	0	0
2008	SFO	2	0	2	2	0	0.0	0	0	0	0	0	0	0	0	0	0
2009	SFO	**16**	**16**	53	49	4	0.0	1	2	2	0	2	10	0	0	0	0
2010	SFO	**16**	**16**	42	38	4	0.5	0	3	0	0	0	9	1	1	0	0
2011	SFO	9	0	5	4	1	0.0	0	0	0	0	0	1	0	0	0	0
2012	OAK	2	2	3	3	0	0.0	1	0	0	0	0	0	0	0	0	0
		100	74	347	309	38	2.5	8	11	87	1	61	58	3	3	11	0
