= Darrin Walls =

American football player and coach (born 1988)

Incarnate Word Cardinals
- Title: Cornerbacks coach / Pass game coordinator

Personal information
- Born: June 20, 1988 (age 38); Pittsburgh, Pennsylvania, U.S.
- Listed height: 6 ft 0 in (1.83 m)
- Listed weight: 190 lb (86 kg)

Career information
- High school: Pittsburgh (PA) Woodland Hills
- College: Notre Dame
- NFL draft: 2011: undrafted

Career history

Playing
- Atlanta Falcons (2011); New York Jets (2012–2015); Detroit Lions (2016)*
- * Offseason or practice squad member only

Coaching
- Baldwin HS (PA) (2017–2019) Defensive coordinator; Slippery Rock (2020) Defensive backs coach; Albany (2021–2022) Cornerbacks coach; Albany (2023–2024) Co-defensive coordinator & cornerbacks coach; Sacramento State (2025) Cornerbacks coach & pass game coordinator; Incarnate Word (2026–present) Cornerbacks coach & pass game coordinator

Career NFL statistics
- Total tackles: 75
- Pass deflections: 22
- Interceptions: 3
- Stats at Pro Football Reference

Darrin Walls, Jr. (born June 20, 1988) is an American college football coach and former cornerback. He currently serves as the cornerbacks coach and pass game coordinator for Incarnate Word, a position he has held since 2026. He was signed by the Atlanta Falcons as an undrafted free agent in 2011. He played college football at Notre Dame.

== Early life ==
Walls spent his childhood and adolescence years playing Pop Warner football for the Garfield Gators Youth Football Organization, which has establish a winning tradition throughout the City of Pittsburgh. He attended and graduated from Woodland Hills High School, the same school that produced Jason Taylor. He was a three-sport athlete in football, baseball and track. In football, he played on both sides of the ball. He helped Woodland Hills to WPIAL title as freshman in 2002. He had 53 tackles and six interceptions and also broke up 30 passes, while also rushing for 550 yards and 11 touchdowns, and catching six passes for 230 yards and three scores as a junior. In his final year, he made 22 tackles, had one interception and rushed 29 times for 235 yards and four touchdowns.

In track & field, Walls competed as a sprinter. He qualified for the 2006 PIAA T&F State Championships in the 100-meter dash (10.94 s) and the 200-meter dash (22.51 s), where he took 11th and 7th, respectively. He also coaches sprinting at Baldwin High School.

== Professional career ==
=== Atlanta Falcons ===
In 2011, he was signed with the Atlanta Falcons as an undrafted free agent. He played five games with the team and had two tackles, an interception and defended two passes for the 2011 season.

=== New York Jets ===
After an injury to Darrelle Revis the New York Jets signed Walls to their practice squad on September 29, 2012. He was promoted to the active roster on November 22. In 2013, Walls split his time as a starter and reliever with Dee Milliner. During the 2015 season, Walls played in 13 games and collected three tackles, three pass defenses and seven special teams tackles.

=== Detroit Lions ===
On March 29, 2016, Walls signed a one-year contract with the Detroit Lions. On September 3, he was released by the Lions.

== Coaching career ==
In 2017, Walls was hired as the defensive coordinator for Baldwin High School.

In 2020, Walls was hired as the defensive backs coach for Slippery Rock.

In 2021, Walls was hired as the cornerbacks coach for Albany. In 2023, he was promoted to co-defensive coordinator while retaining his role as cornerbacks coach.

On December 28, 2024, Walls was announced as the cornerbacks coach and pass game coordinator for California State University, Sacramento.

== Personal life ==
He is the son of former NBA and CBA player Darrin Walls Sr. His father spent time with the Boston Celtics and Houston Rockets in the 1980s before heading to Sacramento to play in the CBA.
