= Wes Lyons =

American football player (born 1988)

No. 15
- Position: Wide receiver

Personal information
- Born: September 12, 1988 (age 38); Pittsburgh, Pennsylvania, U.S.
- Listed height: 6 ft 8 in (2.03 m)
- Listed weight: 233 lb (106 kg)

Career information
- High school: Pittsburgh (PA) Woodland Hills
- College: West Virginia
- NFL draft: 2010: undrafted

Career history
- Spokane Shock (2010)*; Pittsburgh Steelers (2011–2012)*; Pittsburgh Power (2013)*
- * Offseason or practice squad member only
- Stats at Pro Football Reference

Wes Lyons (born September 12, 1988) is an American former football wide receiver. He played college football at West Virginia. Lyons graduated from Woodland Hills High School.

== Professional career ==
=== Spokane Shock ===
After going undrafted in the 2010 NFL draft, Lyons signed with the Spokane Shock of the Arena Football League on September 24, 2010.

=== Pittsburgh Steelers ===
While still under contract with the Shock, Lyons was signed to a two-year contract with the Pittsburgh Steelers on February 15, 2011. Lyons played in all four of the Steelers' preseason games and caught 3 passes for 63 yards. He also caught an eleven-yard touchdown, which was called back due to a holding call. Despite being the third leading wide receiver, he was released on September 2, 2011.

He again signed with the Steelers on March 21, 2012, this time as a tight end. He was once again released on June 12, 2012.

=== Pittsburgh Power ===
Lyons was signed by the Pittsburgh Power on April 16, 2013. Lyons spent the entire season on the Injured Reserve.

== Author ==
Lyons published his first book in 2012 titled "The Pursuit With Patience" about his life and football experiences.
