= Steve Breaston =

American football player (born 1983)

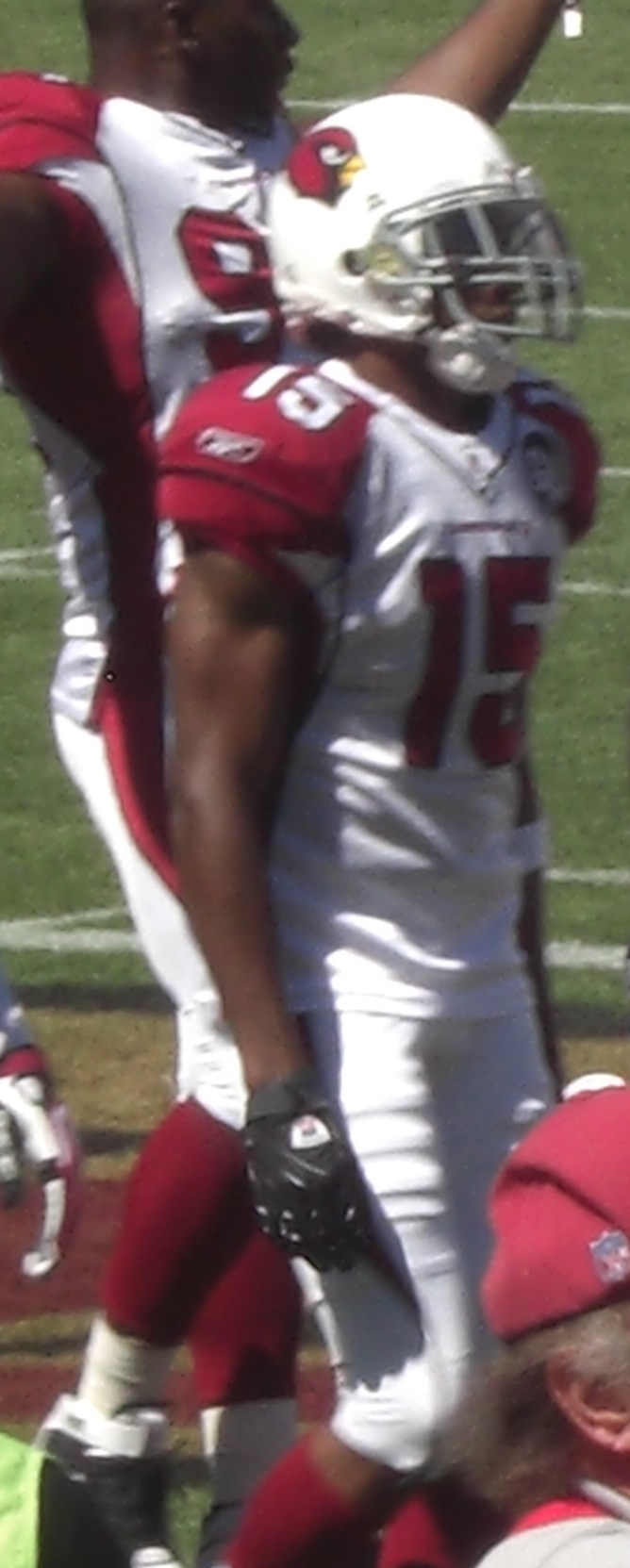
- Breaston with the Arizona Cardinals in 2008

No. 15, 19
- Position: Wide receiver

Personal information
- Born: August 20, 1983 (age 43); North Braddock, Pennsylvania, U.S.
- Listed height: 6 ft 0 in (1.83 m)
- Listed weight: 189 lb (86 kg)

Career information
- High school: Woodland Hills (Pittsburgh, Pennsylvania)
- College: Michigan (2002–2006)
- NFL draft: 2007: 5th round, 142nd overall pick

Career history
- Arizona Cardinals (2007–2010); Kansas City Chiefs (2011–2012); New Orleans Saints (2013)*
- * Offseason or practice squad member only

Awards and highlights
- Big Ten Co-Freshman of the Year (2003)

Career NFL statistics
- Receptions: 255
- Receiving yards: 3,387
- Return yards: 3,126
- Total touchdowns: 11
- Stats at Pro Football Reference

Steven William Breaston (born August 20, 1983) is an American former professional football player who was a wide receiver in the National Football League (NFL). He played college football for the Michigan Wolverines and was selected by the Arizona Cardinals in the fifth round of the 2007 NFL draft. He also played for the Kansas City Chiefs.

== Early life ==
Breaston grew up in North Braddock, Pennsylvania and attended Woodland Hills High School in suburban Pittsburgh, PA. Breaston lettered three times in football at Woodland Hills High School, where he led the team to a 14-1 record and to a berth in the Pennsylvania 4-A state championship game. He helped Woodland Hills win the WPIAL Class AAAA title, gaining 219 yards on 15 carries during a 41-6 victory. The Gatorade Pennsylvania Player of the Year in 2001, Breaston was rated the third-best skill athlete and was named Northeast Offensive Player of the Year by Super Prep. He received a four-star rating and was ranked as the nation's eighth-best "athlete" by Rivals100.com.

Breaston was selected as Pittsburgh Post-Gazette's co-Player of the Year (with quarterback Tyler Palko) and named an All-American running quarterback by Max Emfinger. The versatile athlete gained 2,545 career rushing yards and 37 touchdowns as a quarterback. As a senior, he carried 151 times for 1,718 yards (11.4-yard average) and 24 touchdowns, completed 33 of 79 passes for 600 yards and was involved in 34 scores overall, including 10 touchdown runs of more than 50 yards.

Breaston returned two punts for touchdowns as a senior, including a 93-yarder vs. McKeesport Area High School, and accounted for more than 5,000 all-purpose yards during his last two seasons combined. Breaston lettered twice in basketball and track, winning the district title in the 300-meter hurdles as a junior.

== College career ==
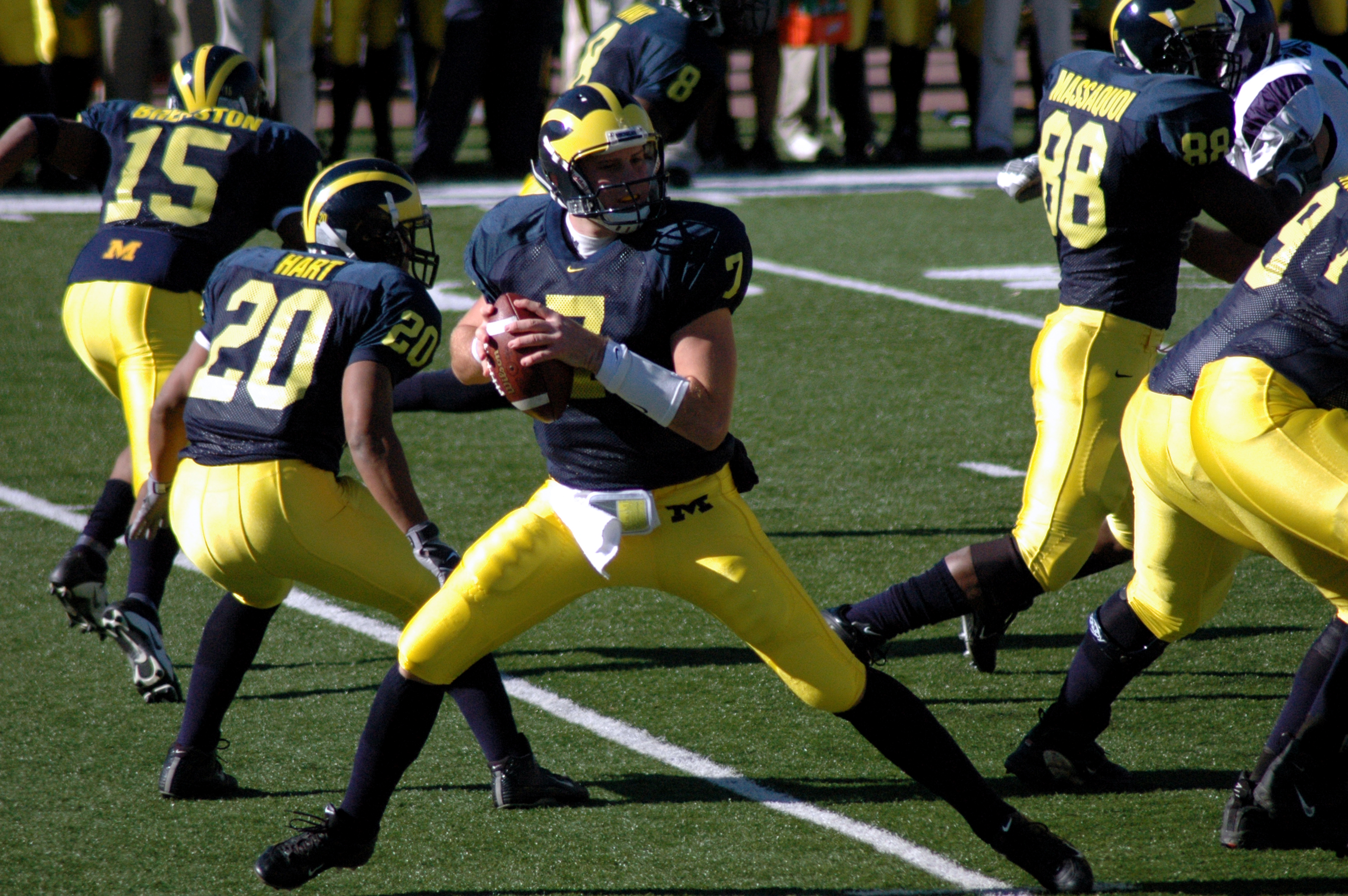
2004 Michigan Wolverines football team #20 Mike Hart, #7 Chad Henne, #15 Breaston, #8 Jason Avant, #88 Tim Massaquoi

Breaston played for the Michigan Wolverines for four seasons (2003–2006). He is the most prolific return man in school history and his 156 career receptions are fifth most in Michigan history.

=== Records ===
Breaston is Michigan's all-time leading punt returner (127 returns for 1,599 yards) and kickoff returner (81 returns for 1,993 yards). He returned four punts for touchdowns, which ties him with Gene Derricotte and Derrick Alexander for the school record, and one kickoff for a score. His combined total of five returns for touchdowns is a Michigan record. Breaston's punt returns and punt return yardage marks are also Big Ten Conference records. Breaston ranks seventh in conference annals in kickoff returns and kickoff return yardage. On January 1, 2005, Breaston set a Rose Bowl record with 315 all-purpose yards which stood until the 2012 contest when it was eclipsed by Jared Abbrederis.

=== National awards ===
- 2006 Maxwell Award watchlist
- 2006 Walter Camp Award watchlist
- 2006 Biletnikoff Award watchlist

=== Conference honors ===
- 2003 Big Ten Freshman of the Year (coaches)
- 2006 Big Ten Conference Sportsmanship Award Honoree
- Four-time Big Ten Football Special Teams Player of the Week

=== 200-yard games at Michigan ===
Breaston had ten games in his U-M career in which he had more than 200 all-purpose yards, as follows:

Rank	Opponent	Date	Rush Yds	Rec Yds	Kick Ret Yds	Punt Ret Yds	Total Yds	TDs	Score
1	Texas	January 1, 2005	15	77	221	2	315	1	37–38
2	Northwestern	November 13, 2004	32	49	79	112	272	2	42–20
3	Penn State	October 15, 2005	3	110	128	28	269	0	27–25
4	Minnesota	October 8, 2005	0	45	186	0	231	1	20–23
5	Indiana	November 11, 2006	0	103	45	83	231	2	34–3
6	Nebraska	December 28, 2005	-2	8	146	72	224	0	28–32
7	Ball State	November 4, 2006	11	50	133	22	216	0	43–26
		Career	321	1696	1993	1599	5569	17	

== Professional career ==
Pre-draft measurables
Height	Weight	Arm length	Hand span	40-yard dash	10-yard split	20-yard split	20-yard shuttle	Three-cone drill	Vertical jump	Broad jump
6 ft 0 3/8 in (1.84 m)	193 lb (88 kg)	33 1/4 in (0.84 m)	9 1/4 in (0.23 m)	4.46 s	1.55 s	2.55 s	4.29 s	6.90 s	33.0 in (0.84 m)	10 ft 4 in (3.15 m)
All results from NFL Combine

=== Arizona Cardinals ===
Breaston was selected by the Arizona Cardinals with the 142nd pick in the fifth round of the 2007 NFL draft. In the fourth game of the 2007 season against the Pittsburgh Steelers, Breaston took a punt back 73 yards for a touchdown, which proved to be the key score, as the Cardinals went on to win the game. Through week 13 of the 2007 season, Breaston had 1,462 return yards for the Cardinals.

Breaston had a breakout year in 2008. Following a serious injury to perennial Pro Bowl receiver Anquan Boldin, Breaston was inserted into the Cardinals' starting line-up at wide receiver. Breaston notably refused to participate in pre-game introductions at home games due to his opinion that he was still a backup, keeping a seat warm for the usual starter Anquan Boldin. Breaston finished the year with 1,006 yards, and he, Boldin, and Larry Fitzgerald became the fifth 1,000 yard receiving trio in NFL history. Breaston's final stats with the Cardinals were 140 receptions, 1,810 yards (12.9 avg), and 6 touchdowns.

=== Kansas City Chiefs ===
On July 29, 2011 Breaston signed a five-year deal with the Kansas City Chiefs. In a week 5 game against the Colts, Breaston played an important role by catching 2 touchdowns to lead the Chiefs to a 28-24 comeback victory. Breaston finished the year with 785 receiving yards and two touchdowns. In 2012, he only had 74 yards. He was released by the Chiefs on February 19, 2013.

=== New Orleans Saints ===
On August 5, 2013, Breaston signed a one-year deal with the New Orleans Saints. On August 19, 2013, he was released by the Saints.

== Career statistics ==
=== NFL ===
Year	Team	Games		Receiving				
Year	Team	GP	GS	Rec	Yds	Avg	Lng	TD
2007	ARI	16	0	8	92	11.5	22	0
2008	ARI	15	6	77	1,006	13.1	58	3
2009	ARI	15	15	55	712	12.9	45	3
2010	ARI	13	11	47	718	15.3	37	1
2011	KC	16	13	61	785	12.9	43	2
2012	KC	10	4	7	74	10.6	24	0
Total		85	64	255	3,387	13.3	58	9

=== College ===
Season	Team	GP	Receiving					Rushing					Punt returns					Kickoff returns				
Season	Team	GP	Rec	Yds	Avg	Lng	TD	Att	Yds	Avg	Lng	TD	Ret	Yds	Avg	Lng	TD	Ret	Yds	Avg	Lng	TD
2003	Michigan	13	38	444	11.7	37	3	12	65	5.4	21	2	45	619	13.8	74	2	9	191	21.2	34	0
2004	Michigan	11	34	291	8.6	50	3	10	76	7.6	20	0	24	292	12.2	67	1	28	689	24.6	53	0
2005	Michigan	11	26	291	11.2	52	2	10	101	10.1	30	0	29	356	12.3	72	0	23	646	28.1	95	1
2006	Michigan	13	58	670	11.6	62	2	10	79	7.9	26	0	29	332	11.4	83	1	21	467	22.2	64	0
Career		48	156	1,696	10.9	62	10	42	321	7.6	30	2	127	1,599	12.6	83	4	81	1,993	24.6	95	1

== Personal life ==
Breaston’s cousin is Toney Clemons.

== See also ==
- Lists of Michigan Wolverines football receiving leaders
