= Chalfant, Pennsylvania =

Borough in Pennsylvania, US

Chalfant
- Borough
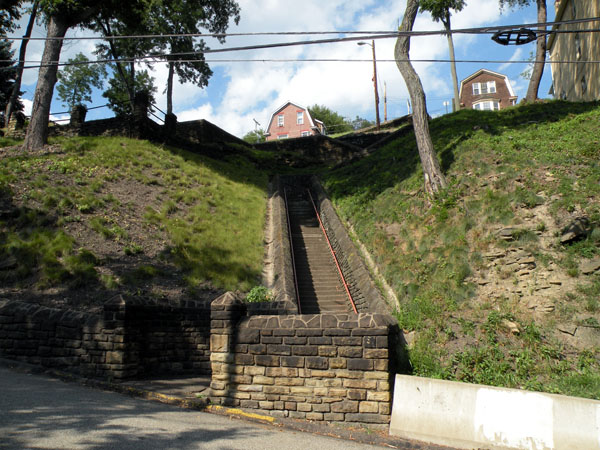
- The Parkway Steps, built in 1936.

- Location in Allegheny County and the U.S. state of Pennsylvania.
- Coordinates: 40°24′36″N 79°50′18″W
- Country: United States
- State: Pennsylvania
- County: Allegheny

Area
  - Total: 0.16 sq mi (0.41 km^{2})
  - Land: 0.16 sq mi (0.41 km^{2})
  - Water: 0 sq mi (0.00 km^{2})

Population (2020)
  - Total: 748
  - Density: 4,726.4/sq mi (1,824.89/km^{2})
- Time zone: UTC-5 (Eastern (EST))
  - Summer (DST): UTC-4 (EDT)
- ZIP code: 15112
- Area code: 412
- FIPS code: 42-12496
- Website: chalfantborough-pa.org

Chalfant is a borough in Allegheny County, Pennsylvania, United States. The population was 748 at the 2020 census.

The borough was named after the Chalfant family of early settlers.

== Geography ==
Chalfant is located at 40°24′36″N 79°50′18″W (40.409968, -79.838285).

According to the United States Census Bureau, the borough has a total area of 0.2 square miles (0.52 km^{2}), all land.

== Government and politics ==
Presidential elections results
Year	Republican	Democratic	Third parties
2020	38% 175	59% 271	1% 6
2016	43% 183	52% 220	5% 20
2012	44% 174	55% 218	2% 7

== Surrounding neighborhoods ==
Chalfant has three borders, including Wilkins Township from the northeast to southeast, North Braddock to the southwest, and Forest Hills to the northwest.

== Demographics ==
Historical population
Census	Pop.	Note	%±
1920	1,044		—
1930	1,192		14.2%
1940	1,372		15.1%
1950	1,381		0.7%
1960	1,414		2.4%
1970	1,370		−3.1%
1980	1,119		−18.3%
1990	959		−14.3%
2000	870		−9.3%
2010	800		−8.0%
2020	748		−6.5%

As of the 2000 census, there were 870 people, 407 households, and 234 families residing in the borough. The population density was 5,498.6 people per square mile (2,123.0 people/km^{2}). There were 449 housing units at an average density of 2,837.8 per square mile (1,095.7/km^{2}). The racial makeup of the borough was 93.45% White, 3.79% African American, 0.23% Native American, 0.69% Asian, 0.11% Pacific Islander, 0.34% from other races, and 1.38% from two or more races. Hispanic or Latino of any race were 0.46% of the population.

There were 407 households, out of which 21.6% had children under the age of 18 living with them, 40.3% were married couples living together, 11.1% had a female householder with no husband present, and 42.5% were non-families. 37.8% of all households were made up of individuals, and 14.3% had someone living alone who was 65 years of age or older. The average household size was 2.14 and the average family size was 2.85.

In the borough the population was spread out, with 18.9% under the age of 18, 7.6% from 18 to 24, 29.4% from 25 to 44, 24.5% from 45 to 64, and 19.7% who were 65 years of age or older. The median age was 41 years. For every 100 females, there were 105.7 males. For every 100 females age 18 and over, there were 97.2 males.

The median income for a household in the borough was $33,125, and the median income for a family was $46,471. Males had a median income of $28,889 versus $21,420 for females. The per capita income for the borough was $17,784. About 5.6% of families and 9.1% of the population were below the poverty line, including 17.6% of those under age 18 and 8.7% of those age 65 or over.
