= S.W. Randall Toyes and Giftes =

Specialty toy store in Pittsburgh

S.W. Randall Toyes & Giftes
- Type: Toy store
- Industry: Retail sales
- Founded: March 1, 1970; 56 years ago in Squirrel Hill (Pittsburgh)
- Founders: Linda & Jack Cohen
- Headquarters: Pittsburgh, Pennsylvania
- Number of locations: 3
- Area served: Pittsburgh, Pennsylvania
- Products: Toys, Hobbies
- Owner: Linda & Jack Cohen
- Number of employees: (25 (2019))
- Website: swrandalltoys.com

S.W. Randall Toyes and Giftes is a toy store which was established in 1970. It is a specialty toy and gift shop with headquarters located in downtown Pittsburgh, selling old-fashioned, idiosyncratic, and nostalgic toys, along with modern toys. The store has been a local landmark since 1970, and "is a Pittsburgh tradition". (Note: "Today, SW Randall Toyes & Giftes has become a Pittsburgh tradition in an industry in which the specialty toy store seems almost as quaint as a cobbler, and in which even major mass market toy retailers are struggling." The large and diverse product line in such small quarters creates a bewildering forest of Stock keeping unit ("SKU") numbers.) It is Pittsburgh's largest specialty toy store, and with a half century of service it is the city's oldest surviving toy business.

== History ==
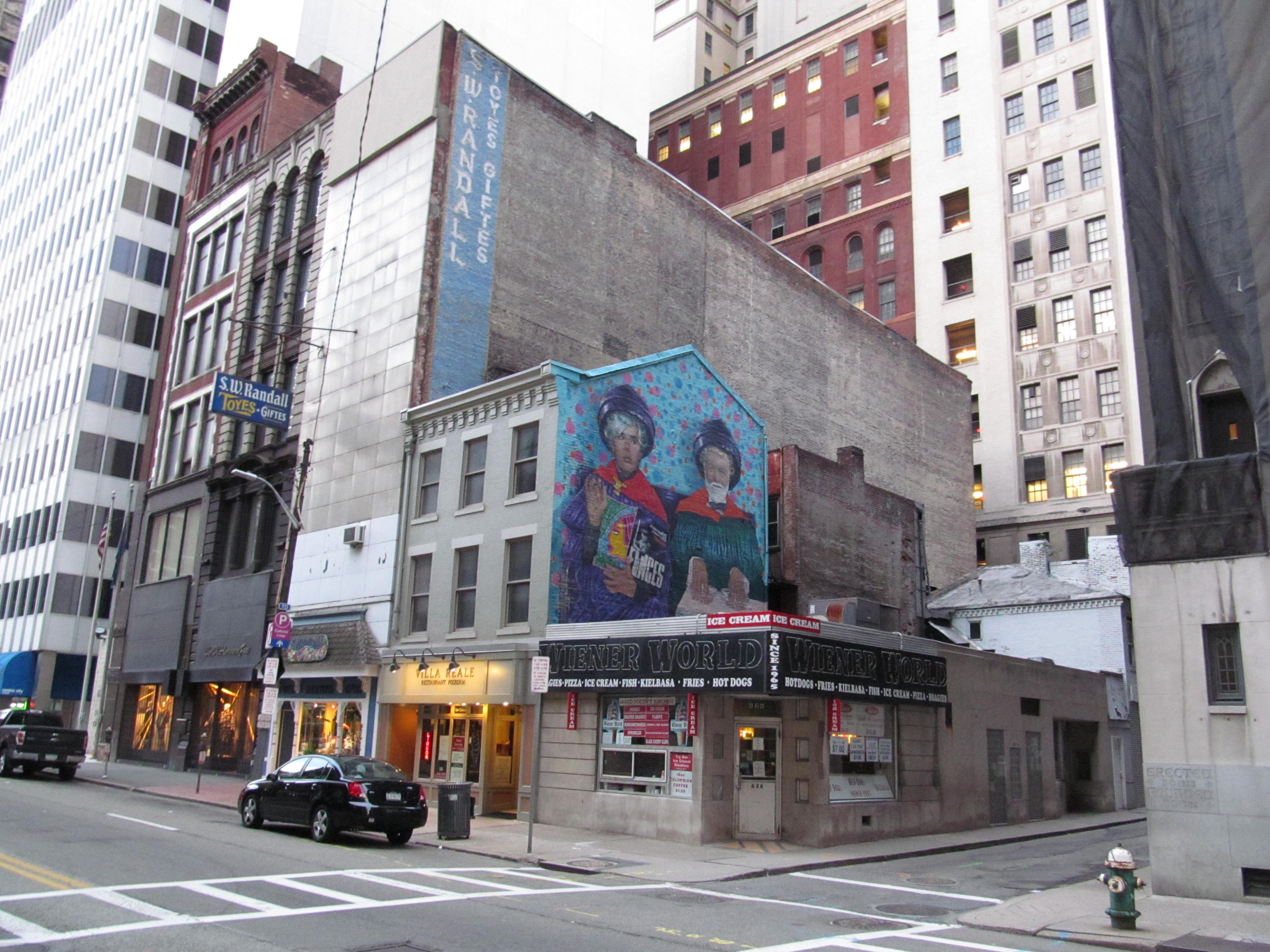
Downtown location 630 Smithfield St. Pittsburgh, PA

Linda was the visionary of the store and founded the original store in 1970 in the Squirrel Hill neighborhood. Linda named it after their children Sherry, Stacey, Wendy, and James (middle name Randall). As of 2019, with her husband Jack, the Cohens still work for the company and it remains a family-run business. Specializing in quirky products that "nobody else has", the store has earned Jack Cohen the sobriquet of "The Toy Keeper".

The stores have been a Pittsburgh landmark and tourist attraction since 1970, and it sells classic toys.

As of 2019, there are three stores: Shadyside, Squirrel Hill, and Downtown Pittsburgh which is the flagship location. (Note: "... the original Squirrel Hill store, one in the city's Shadyside neighborhood, and their flagship location on Smithfield Street in downtown Pittsburgh. It fills a five-story building that the Cohens own, and it's just blocks from the David L. Lawrence Convention Center where ASTRA will hold Marketplace & Academy in June. "If ASTRA attendees come in, we'll take them up to the third floor in our antique, 80-year-old elevator that one of us will operate," Cohen said. "It's even got a crystal chandelier. We're old school, you know.") There were seven stores at the apogee of the company's growth. (Note: Per Mr. Cohen; "We've had to close some stores that weren't profitable. At one point, S.W. Randall had seven stores. We closed Wild & Woolly, a stuffed animal store in Oxford Centre, Downtown, around 1986 after two years in business. A Station Square store closed in 2007 after 25 years because the shopping center didn't have enough traffic under new ownership. A toy store, Alphabet Soup, and a glass store that opened in PPG Place, Downtown, in the mid-1980s were closed.") The company is privately held but according to a 2009 report, the business stocked 30,000 different items, had revenues of $2.5 million and employed 28 people. The company is a member of the American Specialty Toy Retailing Association.

During the 2011 filming of The Dark Knight Rises in Pittsburgh, the store received a boost in sales of older nostalgia Batman items; customers included Christopher Nolan, the film's director, who said he "loved the store". The downtown shop is often a stop on "Haunted Pittsburgh" tours; the third floor reportedly hosts apparitions. (Note: "Staff members tell of seeing a lady's apparition on the third floor with the dolls," reports The Globe, the student newspaper of Point Park University, "Customers have reported 'cold spots,' feeling a 'presence,' and feeling like their energy is being drained.")
