= Joseph Willcox Jenkins =

American classical composer

- Born: 15 February 1928; Wawa, Pennsylvania
- Died: 31 January 2014 (aged 85); Lawrenceville, Pittsburgh, Pennsylvania
- Education: Ph.D., Catholic University; M.M., Eastman School of Music, 1951; B.M., Eastman School of Music, 1950; B.S., St. Joseph's College
- Occupations: Composer, professor, conductor, musician
- Employer: Duquesne University

Joseph Willcox Jenkins (15 February 1928 – 31 January 2014) was an American composer, professor of music, and musician. During his military service in the Korean War, he became the first arranger for the United States Army Chorus. He ended his teaching career as Professor Emeritus at the Mary Pappert School of Music, Duquesne University, where he had been a professor since 1961, and composed over 200 works.

== Early life and military service ==
By the age of six, Jenkins had already begun piano lessons; soon afterward, he started composing small pieces in elementary school. In high school, he wrote numerous arrangements as well as some original works for orchestra. In 1946, Jenkins began his tertiary studies at Saint Joseph's University (then St. Joseph's College) in Philadelphia, where he focused on pre-law with the ambition of becoming a lawyer. At the same time, he studied composition and counterpoint with Vincent Persichetti at the Philadelphia Conservatory (which became part of the University of the Arts in 1962). Jenkins completed his degree at St. Joseph's in three years and enrolled in the Eastman School of Music in 1949. While there, he studied under important composers including Thomas Canning, Howard Barlow, Bernard Rogers, and Howard Hanson. Jenkins graduated from Eastman with a Masters of Music in 1951, in the middle of the Korean War. He was subsequently drafted into the Army and assigned to serve at Fort George G. Meade, in Maryland.

During his military service, Jenkins was the arranger for The United States Army Field Band as well as for the Armed Forces Radio Network. While with the Army Field Band, he composed his now famous American Overture for Band, Op. 13. A 50th anniversary version of American Overture for Band was published by Theodore Presser Company in 2004, with collaboration between Jenkins and the publisher. The original score was updated to include revisions to the work's dynamics, articulations and pitches. American Overture became Jenkins' most successful work and he stated he would be "hard-pressed to duplicate its success."

== Teaching career and reenlistment ==
In 1953, Jenkins held an interim teaching position at Catholic University, replacing a professor on sabbatical. He was so impressed by the faculty and courses at Catholic that he decided to take advantage of G.I. Bill funding and complete his doctorate there, studying under William L. Graves and other scholars. While there, Jenkins also studied under Conrad Bernier, who Jenkins would later list in an autobiographical book chapter under individuals who were especially influential in his development and career.

In 1956, Jenkins reenlisted in the military to become chief arranger and assistant conductor of the United States Army Chorus, formed that same year, becoming the institution's first arranger. Established as the vocal counterpart to the Army Band, the Army Chorus is a premier male vocal ensemble. Jenkins wrote over 270 arrangements for voice while with the Army Chorus, in addition to several original works. Jenkins is known for his vocal arrangements of well-known Stephen Foster works, such as "Beautiful Dreamer," "Camptown Races," "Oh! Susanna," and "Some Folks," which he wrote for the Army Chorus and remain part of its core repertoire, along with many of his other arrangements.

Jenkins began his position as a tenured Professor of Theory and Composition at the Mary Pappert School of Music, Duquesne University in 1961. At Duquesne, he taught music theory, orchestration and composition and "was beloved by his students, colleagues and fellow musicians." During his term at Duquesne, Jenkins served as Head of the Theory and Composition Department in the university's School of Music.

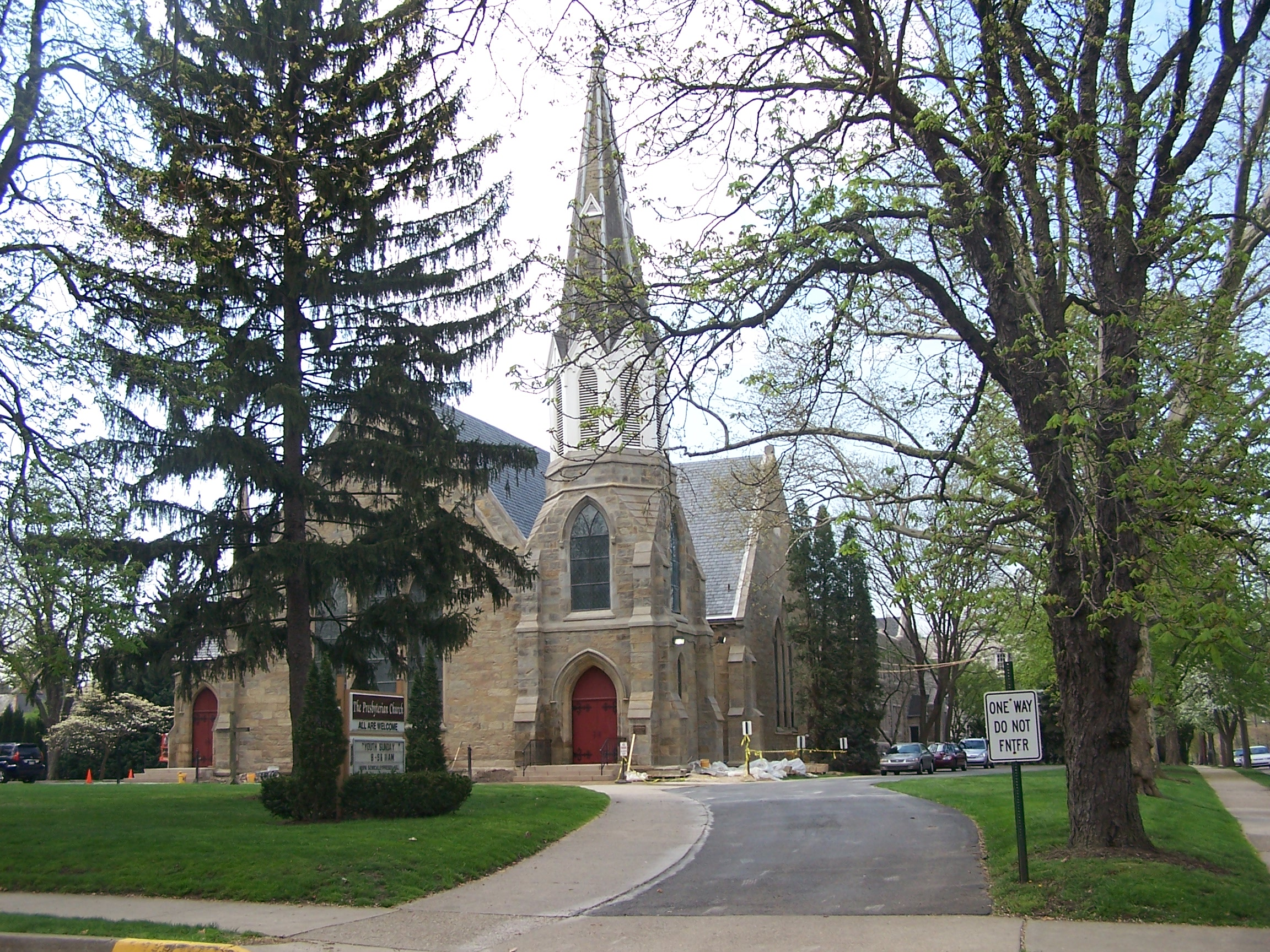
Sewickley Presbyterian Church, where Jenkins was organist and choirmaster, now a Pittsburgh Historic Landmark.

Much of his collected choral works are available as part of Gumberg Library's Music Library Resources, alongside those of jazz guitarist and educator Joe "Handyman" Negri, another music educator who also influenced youth (in Mister Rogers' Neighborhood) and mature minds as a professor at Duquesne. LTC John Clanton, former director of the U.S. Army Orchestra and U.S. Army Chorus, stated that Jenkins is "one of only a handful of composers and arrangers in the entire world who truly understands the musical potential of the male chorus".

In addition to his university teaching, Jenkins influenced students at the primary and secondary school levels as the organist and instrumental music teacher (orchestra director) at St. Edmund's Academy, and by composing works for the orchestra at The Ellis School, both in Pittsburgh, Pennsylvania. He composed works for other elementary and secondary schools, including the Holy Innocents High School of Pittsburgh and the Marlborough School of Los Angeles. Apart from his influence in classrooms, Jenkins participated as organist and choirmaster at Sewickley Presbyterian Church in Sewickley, Pennsylvania, at St. Bernard Catholic Church in Mt. Lebanon, Pennsylvania, and at Rodef Shalom Congregation in Pittsburgh.

== Selected awards ==
- Ford Foundation fellowship (administered by the National Music Council) to serve as composer-in-residence Evanston Township High School, Illinois, 1959
- Sousa/Ostwald Award: Cumberland Gap Overture, 1961
- ASCAP: thirty awards, one every year, 1960-1990
- Omicron Delta Kappa Teacher of the Year Award, 2000
- American Bandmasters Association Award, c. 2007

== Musical works ==
=== For orchestra ===
- 1973 Sinfonia de la Frontera
  - two symphonies
- 1997 "American Overture" (transcribed for orchestra from band piece by D. Wilson Ochoa)

=== For concert band and brass band ===
- 1955 An American Overture, op. 13
- 1959 Charles County Overture
- 1961 Cumberland Gap
- 1969 Cuernavaca
- 1975 Symphonic Jubilee
- 1977 In Traskwood Country
- 1978 Tartan Suite
- 1978 Toccata, op. 104
- 1954 Pieces Of Eight
- 1995 Credimus
- Arioso
- Cannonade (Concert March)
- Concerto for euphonium and band
- Gateway West
  1. Prelude
  2. Romanza
  3. Hoedown
- Purcell Portraits
- Three Images

=== Masses, cantatas and sacred music ===
- 1999 Psalm 100, for mixed choir, op. 191
- 1999 Ave Maria (Hommage a Josquin), chamber choir, op. 192
- 2001 Requiem, for mixed choir and orchestra, op. 198
- Joy to the World, for mixed choir, 3 trumpets, 3 trombones, 2 horns, timpani and organ
- Cantate Hodie (Sing Forth This Day), cantata for soprano, mixed choir, brass and organ, op. 197
  1. Good Christian men, rejoice
  2. In dulci jubilo
  3. The Rocking Carol
  4. Bring your torches
  5. A la nanita nana
  6. I saw three ships
  7. O little town of Bethlehem
  8. Kolyada

=== For choir ===
- 1997 Six Carols for Westerly, for mixed choir, op. 183
- 1997 Six American Folk Tunes, for mixed choir and brass band, op. 185
- 1997 Etz Chayim, for mixed choir, op. 186
- 1999 Vitis Mysticum, for mixed choir and orchestra, op. 193
- Hail Thee, Festival Day, based on Salve festa dies, for mixed choir, 2 trumpets, 2 trombones, timpani and organ
- Heartland, for children's choir and brass band
  1. Dan Tucker
  2. Crockett County
  3. I Shall Not Live in Vain – text: Emily Dickinson
  4. Street Parade
  5. An Indian Summer on the Prairie – text: Vachel Lindsay
  6. The Prairie – text: William Cullen Bryant

=== Vocal ===
- 1959 The Minstrel Boy, for tenor solo, male quartet and choir – text: Thomas Moore
- 1966 Czech Lullaby Carol, for voice, winds, strings and piano

=== Chamber ===
- 1950 Sonata No. 1 (in One Movement) in D minor for viola and piano, Op. 7
- 2002 Sonata da Chiesa for viola d'amore and organ, op. 200
- 2012 Sydney: A Feline Capriccio, op. 217
- two string quartets

=== For organ ===
- 1951 Toccata
- 1966 Six Pieces for Organ
  1. Upon an Old English Hymn Tune
  2. Arioso
  3. Sonata
  4. Adagio in Phrygian Modes
  5. Rondeau
  6. Deo Gracias
- 1968 Fancy and Ayre
- 1999 Confluence
- Thin Small Voice, a biblical symphonic poem

=== For percussion ===
- Bits and Pieces, for Timpani and Piano
