= Swisshelm Park =

- Neighborhood of Pittsburgh
- Coordinates: 40.422°N 79.905°W
- Country: United States
- State: Pennsylvania
- County: Allegheny County
- City: Pittsburgh

Area
  - Total: 0.48 sq mi (1.2 km^{2})

Population (2010)
  - Total: 1,361
  - Density: 2,800/sq mi (1,100/km^{2})

Swisshelm Park is a neighborhood located in the southeast corner of Pittsburgh, Pennsylvania. It is represented on the Pittsburgh City Council by Barbara Warwick. Swisshelm Park houses PBF 19 Engine, and is covered by PBP Zone 4 and the Bureau of EMS Medic 7.

A majority of Swisshelm Park is largely surrounded by Frick Park. Squirrel Hill's Nine Mile Run project borders it on the west; to the north is a section of the park adjacent to the Regent Square and the Parkway East. It also includes Duck Hollow, whose roads only connect to Squirrel Hill, in its borders.

The Sarah Jackson Black Community Center caters to the recreational and civic interests of the neighborhood. The center also lists the names of the hundreds who fought in World War II from the small community, including seven who died in action. Swisshelm Park Parklet is the place for young children to play. The neighborhood adjoins Frick Park, Regent Square, the Squirrel Hill shopping district, and Edgewood Towne Centre.

Swisshelm Park is full of suburban-style ranch and two-story brick homes. Because many city agencies require its employees to be city residents, the suburban character of the neighborhood has attracted many employees in the Department of Public Safety's Bureaus of Fire, Police and EMS, and the Pittsburgh Public School District.

== History ==
Long before it had a name, Swisshelm Park was home to the Susquehannock and Iroquois Indians. Like the adjacent borough of Swissvale, Pennsylvania, Swisshelm Park is named after the Swisshelm family, which moved to the area in 1800, although the land was also known to locals as Deniston Park or North Homestead. John Swisshelm (1752–1838), a veteran of Valley Forge, purchased a grist mill from William Pollock in 1808 and built a small log cabin in Nine Mile Run Hollow. The approximate location of the Swisshelm family homestead was just west of what is now S. Braddock Avenue and W. Swissvale Avenue, with the grist mill likely buried where the adjacent parkway now sits. The largely Scotch-Irish settlers in the area took their grain to Swisshelm's grist mill for grinding, which then made its way to Pittsburgh via the old Braddock Road. The grist mill and barn had crumbled and fallen by 1892, while the old Swisshelm house burned down in 1904.

The Swisshelm name gained fame and prestige from John Swisshelm's daughter-in-law, Jane Grey Cannon Swisshelm, who was a teacher, business owner, prominent feminist, publisher of the Pittsburgh Saturday Visiter - an anti-slavery newspaper - and an organizer of the Underground Railroad. In 1850, Swisshelm made history as the first woman in the Senate press gallery. It was Jane Swisshelm who gave the Borough of Swissvale its name and for whom Swisshelm Park was named.

Before the coal industry moved into Swisshelm Park, the area was mostly farmland. One prominent land-owner in the area was William S. Haven, who was a close friend of Andrew Carnegie's and one of wealthiest men in Pittsburgh at the time. Haven's homestead was adjoined by the Swisshelm residence at Nine Mile Run Hollow and occupied what is today the Edgewood Towne Centre. Haven's wife, Helen (Cooper), gained notoriety during the Civil War for her generous support for the Union troops at nearby Camp Copeland (in the Braddock Borough). She is said to have made daily trips to the camp and, at her own expense, provided the troops with home cooked meals while attending to the sick and dying. Other homesteads in the area were owned by Robert Milligan, John McKelvy, Samuel Deniston, Thomas Dickson, Alexander Gordon, J. S. Newmyer, and Col. William G. Hawkins, all of whom now have schools and streets named after them in Swissvale, Edgewood, and surrounding areas.

The building of the Pennsylvania Railroad through the area in 1852 encouraged industry. The Dickson-Stewart Coal Company began operations in 1866, attracting miners and their families. Swisshelm Park was incorporated into the City of Pittsburgh in 1868, relatively late in the city's history, when Jane Swisshelm was 53 years old. However, as late as the 1930s, residents noted that they were often not considered by others to be "city residents", given the rather isolated nature of the neighborhood. Even today, Swisshelm Park remains unknown to many Pittsburgh residents and is frequently mistaken as a suburb.

== Jackson family and Windermere Drive ==
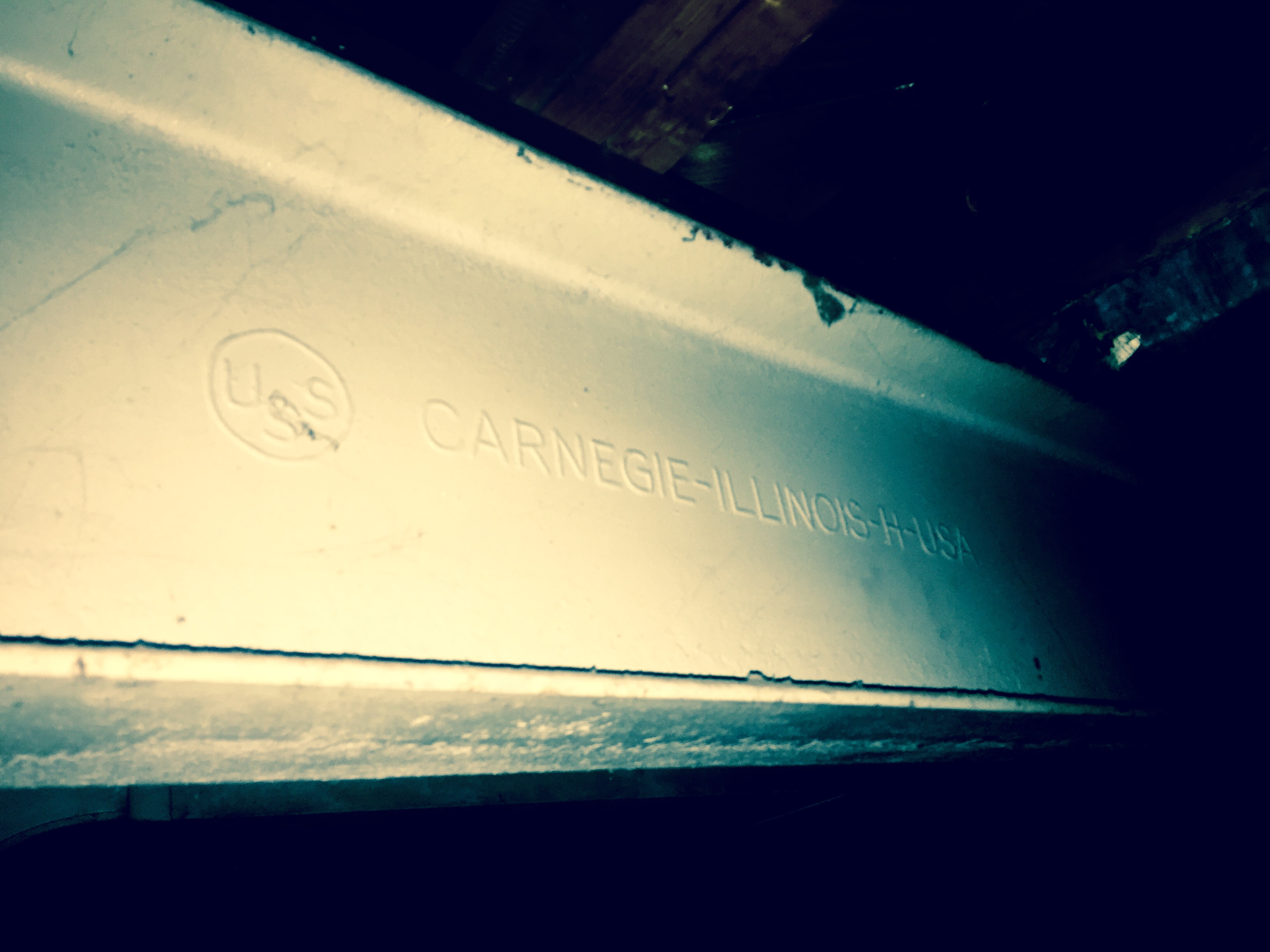

A 35-acre portion of modern-day Swisshelm Park, including most of the area surrounding what is now Windermere Drive, was once owned by George Jackson, who died in 1854 and left the land to heirs.

After the death of his last surviving children Mollie (or Mary), who died in 1889, and Sarah Black, who died in 1912, a scandal erupted over the ownership of the land. Sarah left the land to a distant relative, Robert George Jackson, who was then sued in court by Alice Carey Jackson Cannon. Alice sued for partial ownership of the land on the grounds that she was the illegitimate daughter of Mollie Jackson and was therefore entitled to a portion of the estate. Although her true birth origins were kept secret from her through most of her childhood, Alice eventually learned that she was the child of Mollie and City Fire Bureau Chief Samuel Evans. Having laid bare the secret origins of her birth and producing several witnesses who affirmed her account in court, the judge sided with Alice and awarded her half of the estate, then valued at 1.5 million dollars, in 1915.

The former Jackson farmhouse still stands, and the barn was converted to a community center still in use today, the Sarah Jackson Black Community Center.

A city real estate map from 1939 shows that Robert George Jackson maintained possession of much of the land, which was divided into subplots and named the "Ye Old Swissvale Farm" development. In 1940, Robert George Jackson, a former resident of England, began putting the lots of land on Windermere Drive up for sale to raise money for British bomb refugees during the early stages of World War II. The lots ranged in value from $1,200 to $2,000 apiece, or approximately $20,000 to $32,000 today when adjusted for inflation.

Jackson's connection to England might also explain the origins for the name of the street, as Windermere, the largest natural lake in England, has been a popular place in England for holidays and summer homes since 1846, when the first railroad to the area was built.

Most of the homes on Windermere Drive were built after the war in the early 1950s, with many of the homes supported by steel produced by the Carnegie-Illinois Steel Company in nearby Etna, Pennsylvania.

== Nine Mile Run and Summerset at Frick Park ==
For decades, a concern of Swisshelm Park residents was the condition and reuse of the Duquesne slag area on the northwestern portion of the neighborhood. Although city planners had at one time considered damming the Nine Mile Run and creating a golf course and recreation area, Duquesne Steel Works purchased the area around 1923 and began dumping slag, which is a glass-like material left over after extraction of metals from the smelting or refining of ore. The slag was brought in from the steel mill in Rankin via train and from the Jones and Laughlin Mill via barge, and it slowly buried the park-like terrain and stream, the Nine Mile Run. By the time the dumping finally ceased, in 1972, a large area had been overtaken by two giant mountains of slag, said to be over 10 stories high, with the polluted stream bisecting the slag heaps. The stream eventually became the largest urban stream restoration in the United States carried out by the US Army Corps of Engineers.

In 1996, the Nine Mile Run Greenway Project began at Carnegie Mellon University, which led to the incorporation of the Nine Mile Run Watershed Association, in 2001.

In 1997, construction began to re-purpose the land into an upscale housing development, the Summerset at Frick Park residential development project. The master plan for this brownfield redevelopment project aims to make use of 40 acres along the western border of the Swisshelm Park neighborhood (between the western ends of Onodago Street and Goodman Street) to add an additional 217 new residential housing units and to make significant improvements to the adjacent Frick Park.

== Duck Hollow ==
Duck Hollow is an isolated neighborhood within Swisshelm Park's boundaries. It is accessible to automobiles only via a connection to the Squirrel Hill neighborhood, which previously required traversing an old, weight-restricted bridge. The new McFarren Street Bridge was constructed in 2020 to provide unrestricted access to emergency vehicles and others. It is bounded by the Monongahela River and railroad tracks, and by towering slag heaps across Nine Mile Run.

== Surrounding and adjacent neighborhoods ==
Swisshelm Park has three land borders, two with the Pittsburgh neighborhoods of Regent Square to the northwest and Squirrel Hill South from the north down to the southwest. The other land border is with Swissvale to the east. Across the Monongahela River to the south, Swisshelm Park runs adjacent with Homestead and Munhall.

== See also ==
- List of Pittsburgh neighborhoods
