= Mary Pappert School of Music =

Music school of Duquesne University

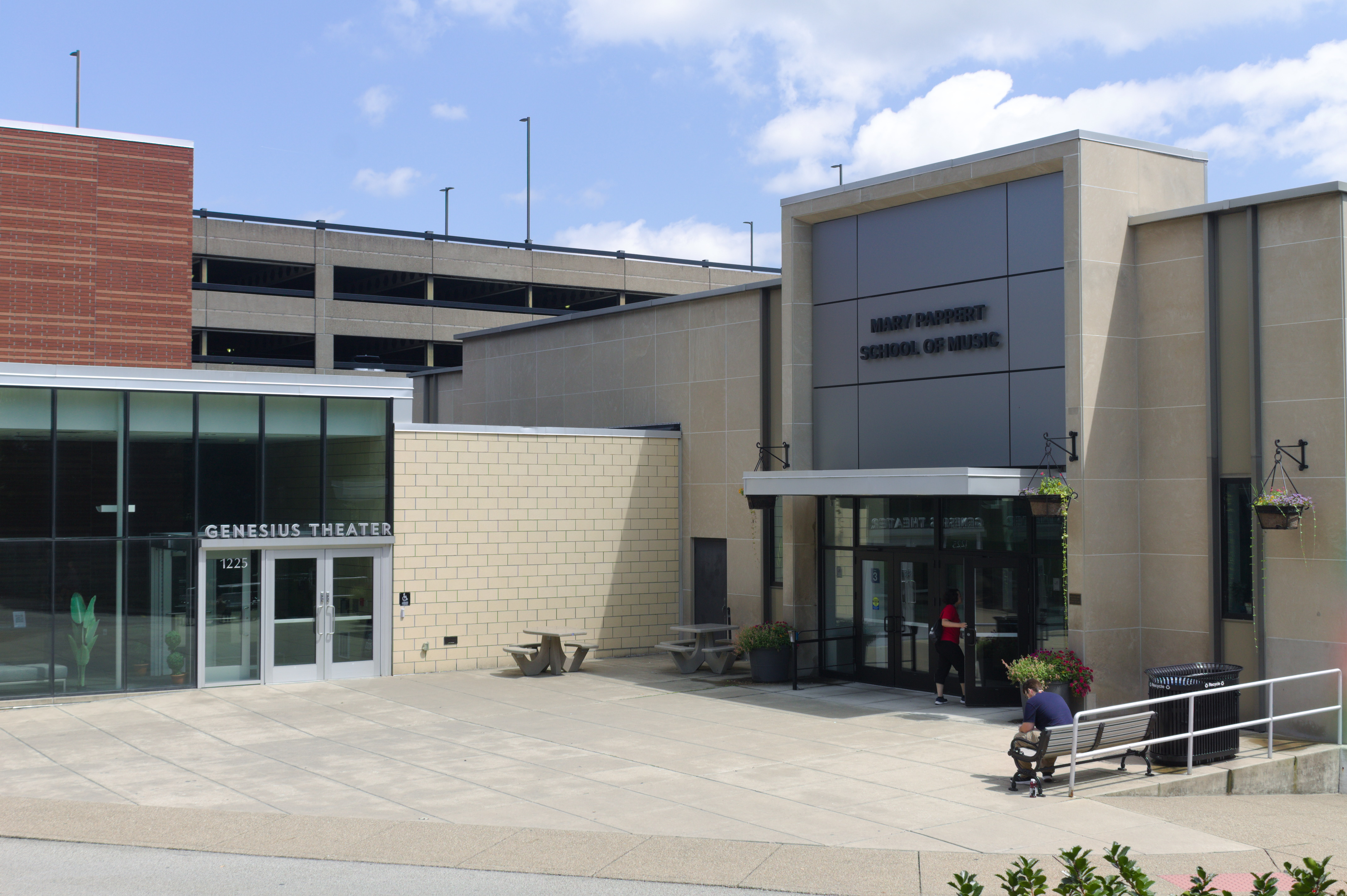
- Upper entrance to the Mary Pappert School of Music and the Genesius Theater
- Type: Private
- Established: 1926; 100 years ago
- Parent institution: Duquesne University
- Dean: David Allen Wehr
- Location: Pittsburgh, Pennsylvania, United States; 40.43656°N 79.98908°W
- Website: www.duq.edu/academics/colleges-and-schools/music/

The Mary Pappert School of Music is the music school of Duquesne University in Pittsburgh, Pennsylvania. Founded in 1926, the school offers undergraduate and graduate programs in music performance, music education, music technology and music therapy. It has been accredited by the National Association of Schools of Music since 1966.

== History ==
Duquesne established its School of Music in 1926. Its earliest program led to the Bachelor of Music degree, and the first graduate degree was awarded in 1928. A Bachelor of Science in Music Education was subsequently added.

The music program was originally part of Duquesne's College of Arts and was housed in the basement of Old Main. After several moves, the university dedicated the school's present building in 1967. The structure, a former United States Post Office garage, had previously been known as the Robinson Building. The school had received accreditation from the National Association of Schools of Music the previous year.

The school was later named in honor of Mary Pappert through an endowment established by her son, Duquesne alumnus P. David Pappert, and his wife, Janet. In 2001, Duquesne became the first Catholic university designated an All-Steinway School, following the acquisition of 68 Steinway pianos for the music school.

== Academics ==
At the undergraduate level, the school offers a Bachelor of Arts in Music, Bachelor of Music degrees in performance and music technology, and Bachelor of Science degrees in music education and music therapy. The music technology program includes concentrations in composition for media and sound recording, while performance programs are offered in classical and jazz areas.

Graduate programs include the Master of Music in Performance, Master of Music Therapy and Artist Diploma programs in performance and chamber music. The school has an enrollment of more than 250 collegiate students.

The school's music education programs are accredited by the Council for the Accreditation of Educator Preparation, and its Bachelor of Science in Music Therapy program is accredited by the American Music Therapy Association.

== Ensembles ==
The school sponsors large and small performing ensembles, including the Symphony Orchestra, Wind Symphony, Symphony Band, Jazz Ensemble, Pappert Chorale and Voices of Spirit, as well as chamber, jazz and instrumental ensembles. Ensembles are also open to Duquesne students who are not music majors, generally by audition.

== Facilities ==
The school occupies a four-story building on Duquesne's main campus. Its principal performance spaces are the 250-seat PNC Recital Hall and the Dr. Thomas D. Pappert Center for Performance and Innovation. Other facilities include recording studios, music-technology laboratories, rehearsal and practice rooms, and 68 Steinway pianos.

== City Music Center ==
The community music division of the school is the City Music Center of Duquesne University, founded in 1989. It provides private instruction, classes, workshops, ensembles and summer programs for children and adult students.

== Notable faculty ==
- Joseph Willcox Jenkins – composer
- Sean Jones – jazz trumpeter
- Joe Negri – jazz guitarist
- David Stock – composer-in-residence
- George Vosburgh – trumpeter
- Ann Labounsky – organist
- Mike Tomaro – saxophonist, composer and arranger

== Notable alumni ==
- Gene Forrell – composer and conductor
- Sammy Nestico – composer and arranger
- Bobby Vinton – singer and actor
- Samuel R. Hazo – composer and conductor

== Administration ==
The dean of the school is pianist David Allen Wehr.
