= Squirrel Hill =

- Neighborhood of Pittsburgh
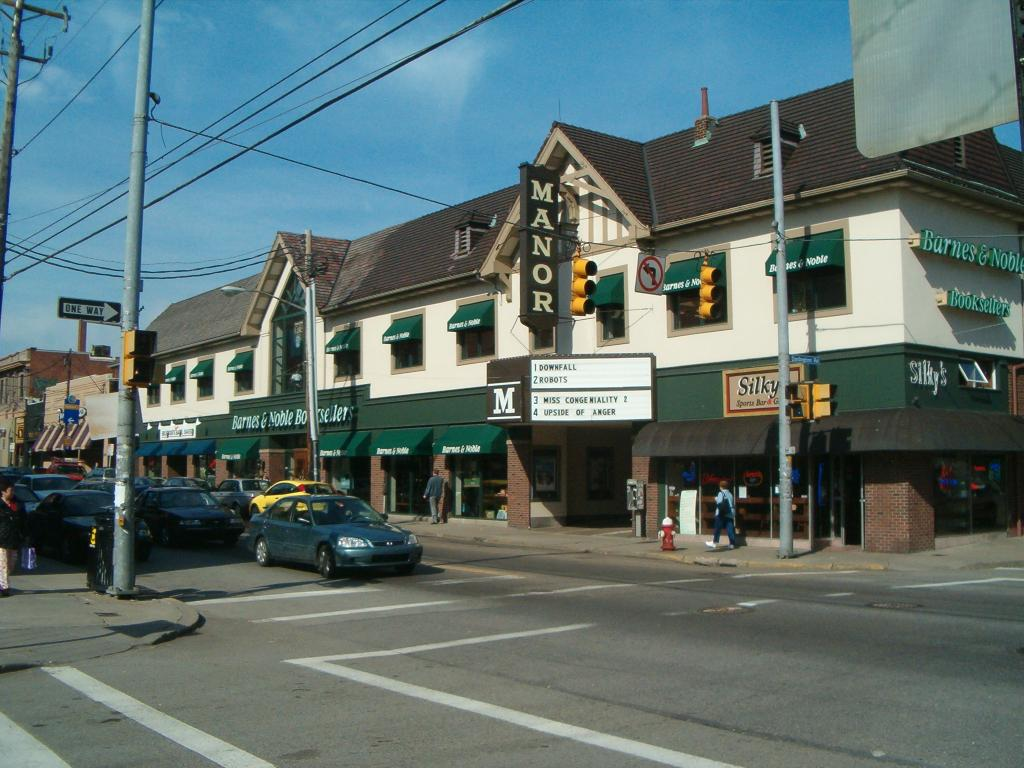
- Murray Avenue in Squirrel Hill in 2005

- Location within the city of Pittsburgh
- Country: United States
- State: Pennsylvania
- County: Allegheny County
- City: Pittsburgh
- Named for: Black squirrel

Area
  - Total: 3.89 sq mi (10.1 km^{2})

Population
  - Total: 27,196
  - Density: 6,800/sq mi (2,600/km^{2})

Squirrel Hill North
- Neighborhood of Pittsburgh

Area
  - Total: 1.222 sq mi (3.16 km^{2})

Population (2020)
  - Total: 11,879
  - Density: 9,721/sq mi (3,753/km^{2})

Squirrel Hill South
- Neighborhood of Pittsburgh

Area
  - Total: 2.671 sq mi (6.92 km^{2})

Population (2020)
  - Total: 15,317
  - Density: 5,735/sq mi (2,214/km^{2})

Murray Hill Avenue Historic District
- Location within Pittsburgh
- 40.449669°N 79.928119°W
- Location: 1010–1201 Murray Hill Avenue (Squirrel Hill), Pittsburgh, Pennsylvania, USA

Squirrel Hill is a residential neighborhood in the East End of Pittsburgh, Pennsylvania, United States. The city officially divides it into two neighborhoods, Squirrel Hill North and Squirrel Hill South, but it is almost universally treated as a single neighborhood.

== Geography ==
Squirrel Hill is located at 40.438072°N 79.922972°W and has two ZIP codes: 15217 and 15232.

== Surrounding neighborhoods ==
Squirrel Hill North has five borders with the Pittsburgh neighborhoods of Shadyside to the north, Point Breeze to the east, Squirrel Hill South to the south, Central Oakland to the southwest and North Oakland to the west.

Squirrel Hill South has nine land borders with the Pittsburgh neighborhoods of Squirrel Hill North to the north and northwest, Point Breeze to the northeast, Regent Square to the east, Swisshelm Park to the southeast, Glen Hazel and Hazelwood to the south-southwest, Greenfield to the southwest, and South Oakland and Central Oakland to the west. Across the Monongahela River to the south-southeast, Squirrel Hill South runs adjacent to Homestead.

== Demographics ==
As of the 2010 Census, Squirrel Hill North has a population of 11,363, having grown 9% since 2000. Squirrel Hill North's population is 75% White, 17% Asian, 4% Hispanic, and 3% Black. Of the 3,892 housing units in Squirrel Hill North, 93% are occupied.

Squirrel Hill South has a population of 15,110, up 4% since 2000, of whom 82% are White, 11% are Asian, 3% are Hispanic, and 3% are Black. There are 7,514 housing units which have a 95% occupancy rate.

In 2010, about 40% of Squirrel Hill's residents were Jewish. According to a 2002 study by the United Jewish Federation, 33% of the Jewish population of Greater Pittsburgh was living in Squirrel Hill, and another 14% was living in the surrounding neighborhoods. The report states that: "The stability of Squirrel Hill, a geographic hub of the Jewish community located within the city limits, is unique in North America."

=== Asian/Chinese community ===
Per the October 17, 2019 issue of Pittsburgh Magazine, the area is also becoming Pittsburgh's new Chinatown with an influx of mainland Chinese students from Carnegie Mellon University. The area celebrates Chinese New Year annually with a parade. The area as of 2017 was about 17% Asian.

== History ==
=== Origins ===
The name "Squirrel Hill" may have been given to the area by the Native Americans who lived in its vicinity. The neighborhood most likely was named for the abundance of gray squirrels.

The growth and development of Squirrel Hill was initially focused on the riverfront along the Monongahela River. The first recorded house was built in 1760 by a soldier at nearby Fort Pitt, Colonel James Burd, at a place called Summerset on the Monongahela River. Squirrel Hill's next house was built by Ambrose Newton some time in the 1760s. This house is still standing and is located in what is now Schenley Park along Overlook Drive (near the ice skating rink). Its first "business district" was the intersection of Brown's Hill Road and Beechwood Boulevard.

In 1778, John Turner built his estate of Federal Hill nearby (along what is now Beechwood Boulevard). He later established the Turner cemetery in 1838 inside his estate, which he donated to the local community when he died in 1840. This cemetery holds the remains of many of the original settlers of Squirrel Hill. The Mary S. Brown Memorial Methodist church was also built on adjoining lands donated by Turner. This church was rebuilt several times, but the current building, which dates from 1908, is the oldest standing church in Squirrel Hill.

The third house in Squirrel Hill, Neill Log House, was built by Robert Neill around 1765, also in what is now Schenley Park. The Neills owned 262 acres (1.06 km^{2}) of land in the northern section of Schenley Park. In 1795, the Neills moved from this house to a location in what is now Market Square in downtown Pittsburgh. After they died, the house was handed down to two different people before it was sold to General James O'Hara. O'Hara's granddaughter, Mary Schenley, gave the property to the city of Pittsburgh in 1889. For a time, the house was rented out by the city to vacationers, but by 1969, the house was in such poor condition that it was dismantled and rebuilt by the Pittsburgh History and Landmarks Foundation. It still exists and is open for tours during the Vintage Grand Prix in July.

Around 1820, William "Killymoon" Stewart built one of the first tavern/inns in the area. His was located near the intersection of Beechwood and Brown's Hill Road, and it operated for over 100 years. Slowly, Squirrel Hill became a prosperous and affluent suburb.

Around 1840, the Murdoch family started a farm and nursery business in the part of Squirrel Hill North which is known today as Murdoch Farms. Today, this quiet area contains many upscale homes.

By the 1860s, the area along Fifth Avenue near Woodland Road had several mansions, including Willow Cottage. The cottage was built by the industrialist and civic leader Thomas M. Howe, a bank president and member of the U.S. House of Representatives from 1851 to 1855. Though neglected for many years and almost torn down, Willow Cottage underwent a $2.2 million restoration and renovation into a Chatham University gatehouse and guesthouse.

==== Civil War ====
On December 24, 1860, protests broke out in the streets of Squirrel Hill after news arrived that the U.S. Secretary of War, John B. Floyd had ordered 124 cannons to be shipped from Allegheny Arsenal to two forts under construction in Louisiana and Texas. The inhabitants of Pittsburgh predicted that these weapons would be used against them if the South seceded, and this did indeed happen at Fort Sumter.

==== Incorporation into Pittsburgh ====
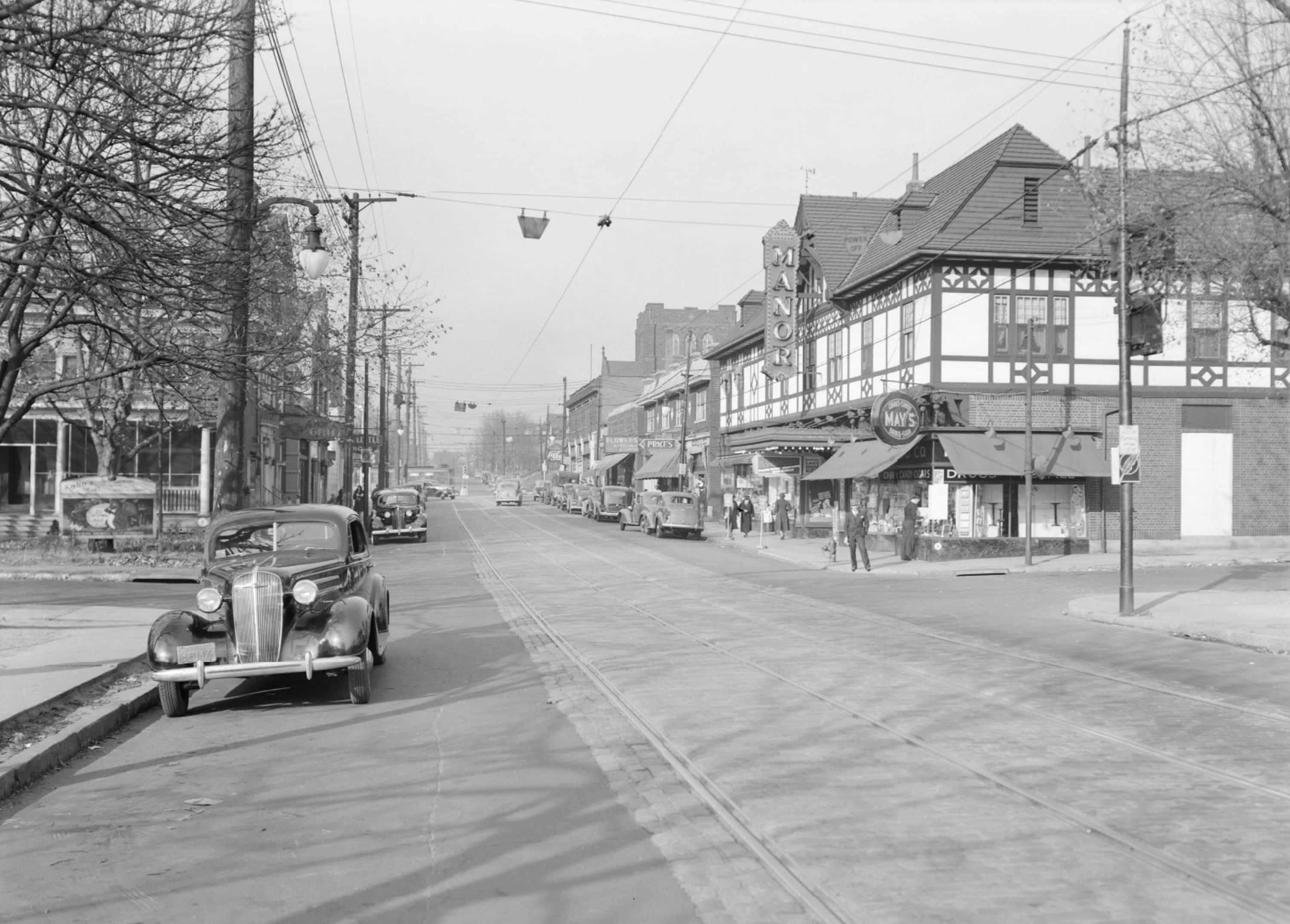
Murray Avenue in Squirrel Hill, looking north near Darlington Road, circa 1937. The electric trolley lines are clearly visible running down the center of the street.

Prior to 1868, the Squirrel Hill area was part of Peebles Township. This changed in 1868, when the area was annexed to the city of Pittsburgh.

Following the Civil War, several of Pittsburgh's richest families built multiple houses in the Woodland Road area between Fifth and Wilkins Avenues. In 1869, a women's college, the predecessor to Chatham University, was established nearby. Today, Chatham University owns several of these large houses.

In 1869, the clubhouse of the Pittsburgh Golf Club was built at the new Schenley Park Golf Course (The present building by Alden and Harlow was constructed in 1900.) In 1876, the Homewood Cemetery was established on 176 acres (0.71 km^{2}) of land in Squirrel Hill.

Over the course of the 19th century, the focus of Squirrel Hill shifted from its riverfront at the Monongahela River to the area closest to Oakland and Shadyside. Ebdy's orchard was located near Shady Avenue and Murdoch's farm, known for its flowers, fruit trees, and vegetable trees was located on the hill above Oakland. By the late 1800s, the building of trolley lines caused a migration of wealthy executives outwards toward country estates and workers inward toward trolley lines. Farms were sold, and divided for new housing developments.

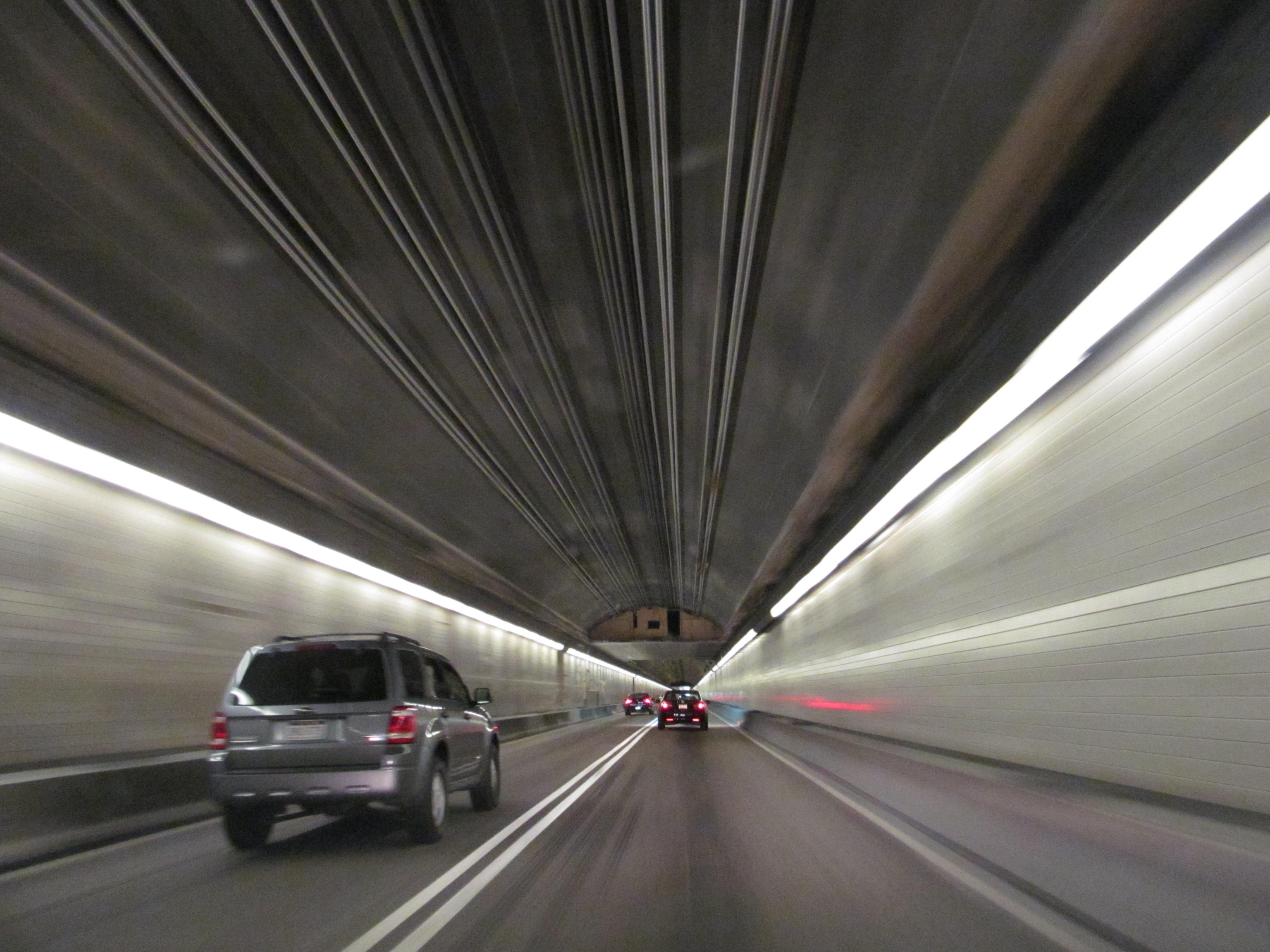
Inside the Squirrel Hill Tunnel, which runs underneath the southern half of Squirrel Hill

The growth of Squirrel Hill accelerated when an electric trolley was installed in 1893. The trolley line ran via Forbes Avenue and Murray Avenue, terminating in Homestead. The trolley line facilitated the building of hundreds of houses for the middle management of local factories, especially on Shady and Denniston Avenues near Aylesboro. Despite its trolley line, Murray Avenue remained a dirt road until 1920. Murray Avenue carried three Pittsburgh Railways trolley lines (#69 Squirrel Hill, #60 East Liberty-Homestead and #68 Homestead-Duquesne-Kennywood-McKeesport) until 1958 when the trolleys were replaced by buses. Bus routes 61A, 61B, 61C, 61D, 64, 67, 69, and 74 pass through the area today.

Squirrel Hill grew even more with the opening of the Boulevard of the Allies in 1927, providing a direct link to downtown Pittsburgh. By the 1930s, most of the available land in Squirrel Hill had been filled.

In 1953, the Parkway and Squirrel Hill Tunnel were opened. They gave the area easier and quicker access from surrounding neighborhoods.

== Cultural life ==
Squirrel Hill's business area along Forbes and Murray avenues is referred to as "upstreet" (a contraction of "up the street") by locals. In addition to the many retail businesses in the neighborhood, there are a number of longtime, non-profit organizations, including a branch of the Carnegie Library of Pittsburgh, the Jewish Community Center of Greater Pittsburgh, the Jewish Family & Children's Service of Pittsburgh, the Children's Institute of Pittsburgh, and the Squirrel Hill Urban Coalition. Many annual events are hosted in Squirrel Hill by various community organizations.

== Parks ==
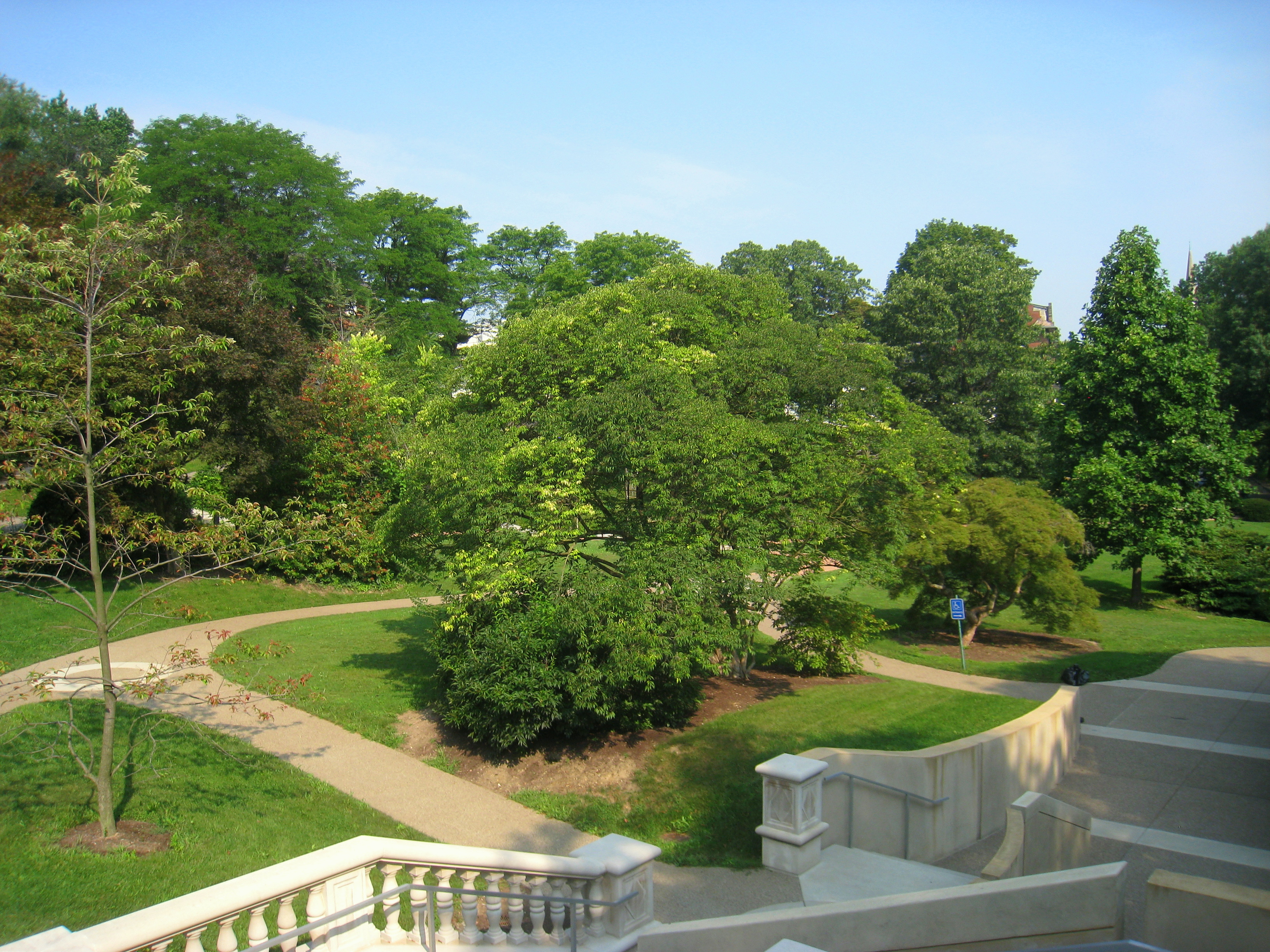
Chatham University Arboretum, located in the north of Squirrel Hill

Squirrel Hill contains several nature-related points of interest. They include the Chatham University Arboretum, originally belonging to Andrew Mellon; Schenley Park; and Frick Park.

In 1889, Schenley Park was established on land donated from Mary Schenley, whose grandfather had been the owner of considerable amounts of land in the area. The original size of the park was 120 acres (0.49 km^{2}), though it eventually expanded to 456 acres (1.85 km^{2}) over the years.

When Henry Clay Frick died in 1919, he bequeathed 150 acres (0.61 km^{2}) of undeveloped land to the City of Pittsburgh for use as a public park. He provided a $2 million trust fund to assist with the maintenance of the park. Frick Park on the eastern border of the Squirrel Hill neighborhood opened in 1927. Between 1919 and 1942, money from the trust fund was used to enlarge the park, increasing its size to almost 600 acres (2.4 km^{2}). In February 2004, Frick Park grew with the addition of the Nine Mile Run stream restoration area which flows to the Monongahela River. The United States Army Corps of Engineers managed the restoration funded with $5 million in federal money and $2.7 million raised by the city. The restoration was completed in 2006.

== Jewish community ==
The origins of Squirrel Hill's Jewish community dates from the 1920s when Eastern European Jews began to move to the neighborhood in large numbers from Oakland and the Hill District. Many of them took up residence in rows of brick houses on the cross streets of Murray Avenue south of Forbes, such as Darlington Road, Bartlett Street, and Beacon Street. The neighborhood became the center of Jewish culture in the city, with kosher butcher shops, delicatessens, Jewish restaurants, bookstores, and designer boutiques. Several hundred Russian Jewish immigrants moved to the neighborhood in the 1990s.

A 2017 study of the Greater Pittsburgh Jewish community, conducted by researchers at Brandeis University and commissioned by the local Jewish Federation, found that 26% of Pittsburgh-area Jews live in Squirrel Hill, 20% live in the South Hills, 9% live in the North Hills, 31% live in other areas of Pittsburgh, and 14% live in other areas of the region. Although Squirrel Hill remains the traditional center of Jewish life in the region, the study found a shift to more suburban areas. The study also found an increase in the population of Jews who identify as Orthodox or secular, and a decrease in the number of Jews who identify with Conservative and Reform denominations. This feature of Squirrel Hill and surrounding Jewish communities, sustained locations of Jewish life across time and denominations, makes the area unusual compared to Jewish life in other cities. Elsewhere, Jews tended to migrate in waves to suburban areas during the twentieth century, and more geographic separation exists between denominations compared to Pittsburgh.

All of Squirrel Hill, as well as much of the adjoining neighborhoods of Greenfield and Regent Square, is within an eruv, a symbolic enclosure that allows Orthodox Jews to carry items or push a stroller on Shabbat (the Jewish sabbath), during which certain activities are not permitted. Moving items from private domain to a public domain is not permitted on Shabbat, so an eruv creates a single, private shared space, and carrying within it is permitted. The irregular boundaries of the eruv are such that, as one writer noted, "an Orthodox Jew could carry something within the eruv's boundaries all the way from the north end of the Hot Metal Bridge to the intersection of Wilkins and South Dallas in Point Breeze."

Squirrel Hill contains three Jewish day schools: two are affiliated with the Chabad and Modern Orthodox movements, respectively, while Community Day School is a co-ed, independent Jewish day school in the neighborhood that attracts families across the wide spectrum of Jewish belief and practice.

=== Antisemitic attacks ===
On April 17, 1986, Neal Rosenblum, a 24-year-old rabbinical student visiting from Toronto, was shot and killed near his in-laws' house in Squirrel Hill. A suspect, 45-year-old Steven M. Tielsch, was arrested in 2000 after bragging to a fellow prison inmate that he had killed a Jew. Tielsch's first three trials ended in a deadlocked jury; he was convicted of third-degree murder in a fourth trial in 2002. The Supreme Court of Pennsylvania upheld the decision in 2007.

On October 27, 2018, Robert Bowers entered the Tree of Life – Or L'Simcha synagogue during Shabbat morning services and opened fire, killing 11 people and injuring six, including four police officers.

== Education ==
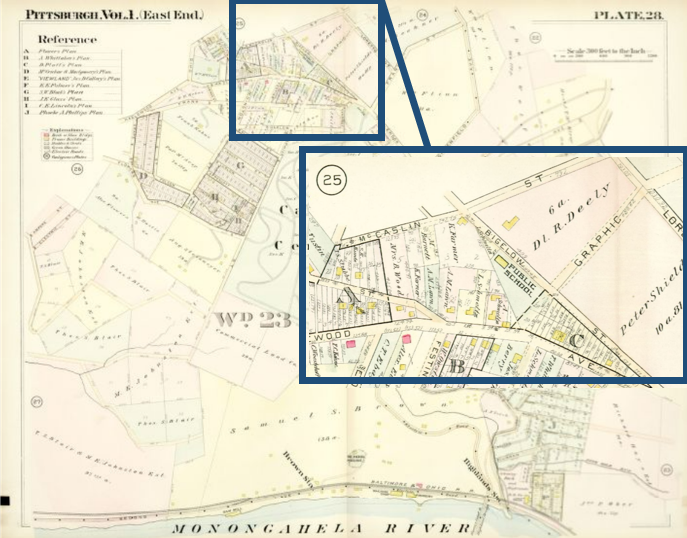
1898 Hopkins Map, Plate 28 of Glen Hazel, Hazelwood, Squirrel Hill South showing the Squirrel Hill Public School at the intersection of Bigelow and Hazelwood.

=== Public schools ===
The Free Public School Act of 1834 ordered school districts not only to establish free schools but also to establish them in townships outside city limits. This affected Squirrel Hill, since it was part of Peebles Township at the time.

John Turner, who never learned to read or write but became a wealthy landowner, left land and money to the community to build a school when he died in 1844 at the age of 83. It was called Squirrel Hill School and was located on Bigelow Street at Hazelwood Avenue in the Greenfield neighborhood. Its successor closed in 1915 and was replaced by Roosevelt School, named for then-president Theodore Roosevelt. It closed in 1957. It was replaced by John Minadeo Elementary School, named for a ninth-grade school crossing guard who gave his life to save a group of young students in the path of a runaway car near Gladstone School.

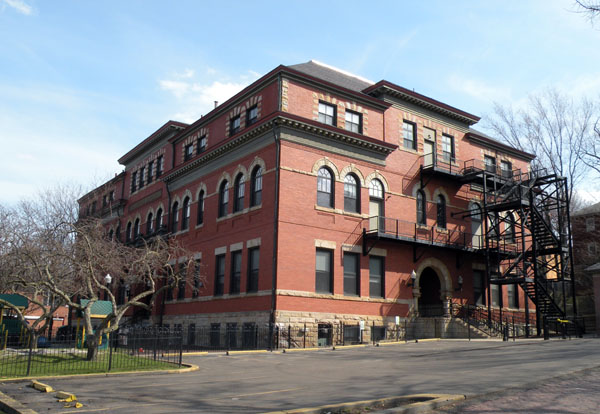
The Wightman School closed in 1980, and the building is now used as a community center.

After Peebles Township was annexed by Pittsburgh in 1868, Squirrel Hill became the Colfax School District, named for Schuyler Colfax, who was Vice President of the United States under President Ulysses S. Grant. The district had five numbered schools. Colfax No. 1 was located at Phillips Avenue and Beechwood Boulevard. Today, it is Pittsburgh Colfax K-8. Colfax No. 2 was on Beechwood Boulevard near the intersection of Saline Street and Hazelwood Avenue near Browns Hill Road. It closed in 1907 but was reopened in 1916 as the Roosevelt School Annex when Roosevelt became overcrowded. The annex closed in 1939. Colfax No. 3, on Forward Avenue, became Forward Avenue School and was named after Walter Forward, who was appointed U.S. Secretary of the Treasury by President John Tyler. The school was torn down in 1923, but its retaining wall still exists under the Parkway East bridge over Saline Street. Colfax No. 4, at Whipple and Commercial streets, became Swisshelm School and was named for Jane Swisshelm, a writer and abolitionist. Colfax No. 5, at Solway and Wightman streets, became Wightman School and was named for Thomas Wightman, owner of the Thomas Wightman Glass Company. Wightman operated as a school from 1897 to 1980 and since then has been used as a community center building and the home of Carriage House Children's Center. The building underwent extensive restoration and remodeling to make it one of only two older buildings in Western Pennsylvania to have LEED Gold certification.

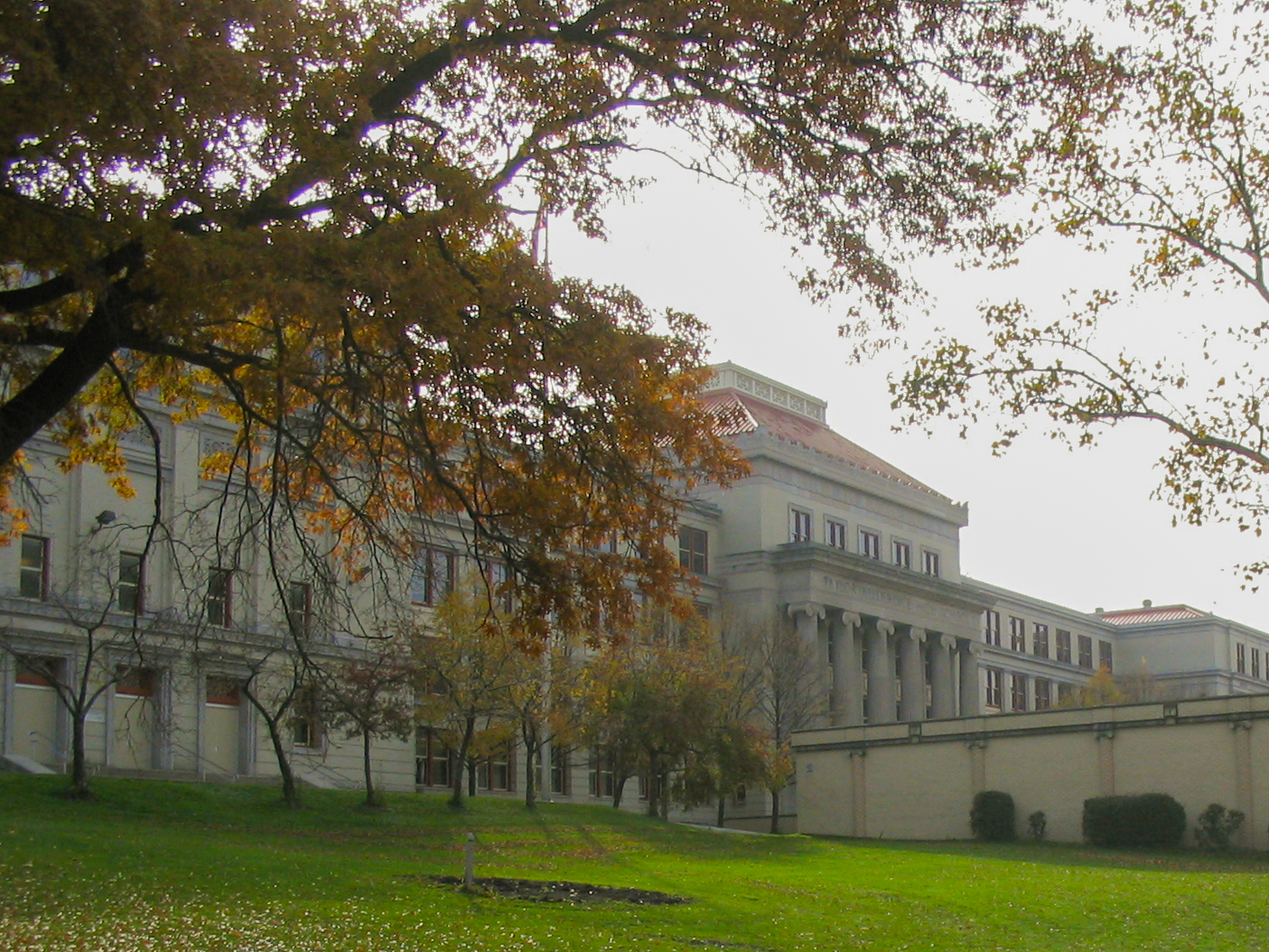
Taylor Allderdice High School

Two other public elementary schools existed in Squirrel Hill. Brown School was built near the Monongahela River in 1888 on land donated by the Brown family. It closed in 1932. H.B. Davis School, named for a principal of the Frick Training School for Teachers, was located on Phillips Avenue. It opened in 1931 and closed in 1980.

Squirrel Hill's Taylor Allderdice High School opened in 1927. It was named for the president of the National Tube Company, who was also a member of the Pittsburgh Public Schools Board of Education, which was created in 1911 and given jurisdiction over all the public schools in the city, including those in Squirrel Hill.

=== Private schools ===
Some private schools located in Squirrel Hill are St. Edmund's Academy, a private nonsectarian (formerly Episcopal) elementary school; Community Day School, a co-ed, independent Jewish day school for students ages 3 to grade 8; Hillel Academy of Pittsburgh; and Yeshiva Schools of Pittsburgh. The Day School at the Children's Institute of Pittsburgh serves children with a wide range of special needs.

=== Higher education ===
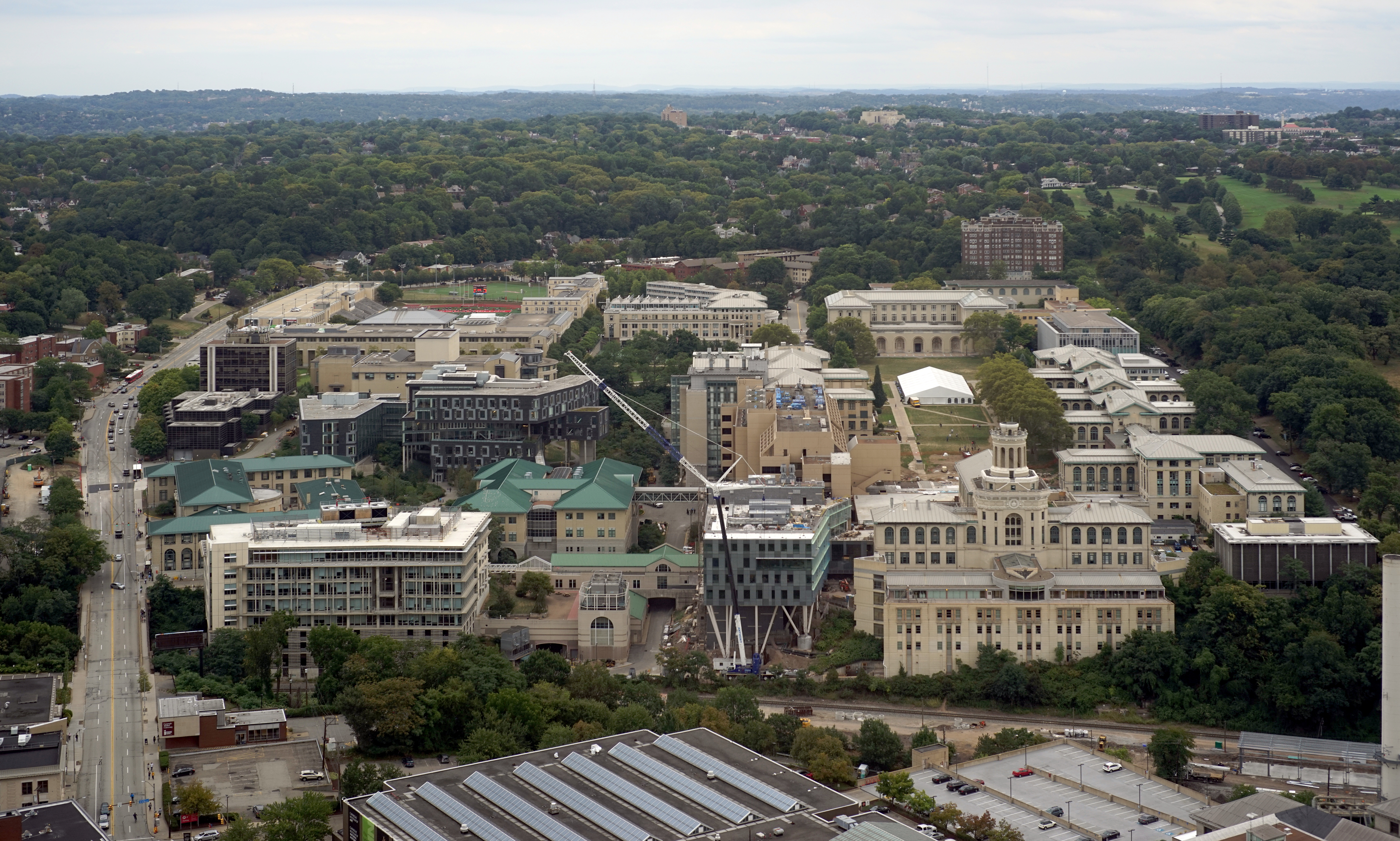
Carnegie Mellon University

Carnegie Mellon University (CMU) and Chatham University are located in Squirrel Hill, although many of CMU's buildings are in Oakland. CMU borders Pittsburgh's Oakland neighborhood, while Chatham borders Shadyside.

== Local government ==
The neighborhood is represented on Pittsburgh City Council by Barb Warwick (District 5, Squirrel Hill South) and Erika Strassburger (District 8, Squirrel Hill North).

== Notable people ==
- Marty Allen – stand-up comedian and actor
- Mel Bochner (born 1940) – artist
- Janice Burgess (1952–2024) – former Nickelodeon executive and creator of The Backyardigans
- Richard Caliguiri – former mayor of Pittsburgh
- Willa Cather – author
- Murray Chass – sports journalist, member of baseball Hall of Fame
- Danny Chew – former professional road racing and ultramarathon cyclist
- Myron Cope – sports journalist, radio personality, and sportscaster
- Iris Rainer Dart – author and playwright
- Jerry Fielding – composer
- Bob Filner (born 1942) – politician, congressman and San Diego mayor
- Howard Fineman – journalist
- Bernard Fisher – physician, scientist, and pioneer in the biology and treatment of breast cancer
- Rich Fitzgerald – politician
- Gary Graff – music journalist and author
- Joseph Koerner – art historian and filmmaker
- Maxine Lapiduss – television producer, television writer, and comedian
- Sally Lapiduss – television producer and writer
- Steve Lieber – comic book illustrator
- Kathleen Marshall – choreographer, director, and creative consultant
- Rob Marshall – theater director, film director, and choreographer
- Sophie Masloff – former mayor of Pittsburgh
- Lucian Wintrich – artist, writer, media personality, and former White House Correspondent for The Gateway Pundit
- Mac Miller – rapper and record producer
- David Scott Milton – author, playwright, screenwriter and actor
- Bob O'Connor – former mayor of Pittsburgh
- Fred Rogers – host, Mister Rogers' Neighborhood
- Robert Schmertz – artist
- Herbert A. Simon – political scientist, economist, sociologist, psychologist, and professor
- Mike Tomlin – former Pittsburgh Steelers head coach
- Bari Weiss (born 1984) – former New York Times opinion section staff editor
- Evan Wolfson – attorney and gay rights advocate

== See also ==
- List of Pittsburgh neighborhoods
- History of Pittsburgh
- Jewish history in Pittsburgh
- Squirrel Hill, Philadelphia, Pennsylvania – a smaller neighborhood with the same name
- Squirrel Hill Tunnel – carries Interstate 376 under the neighborhood
- Summerset at Frick Park
- S.W Randall Toyes & Gifts

== Notes and references ==
=== Further reading ===
- Toker, Franklin (1994) [1986]. Pittsburgh: An Urban Portrait. Pittsburgh: University of Pittsburgh Press. ISBN 0-8229-5434-6.
- Squirrel Hill Historical Society (2005). Images of America – Squirrel Hill. Arcadia Publishing. ISBN 0-7385-3717-9.
- History of the JCC Pittsburgh
- The Corner Where You Are: A Sesquicentennial History of Sixth Presbyterian Church of Pittsburgh by David W. Miller
