= Regent Square (Pittsburgh) =

- Neighborhood of Pittsburgh
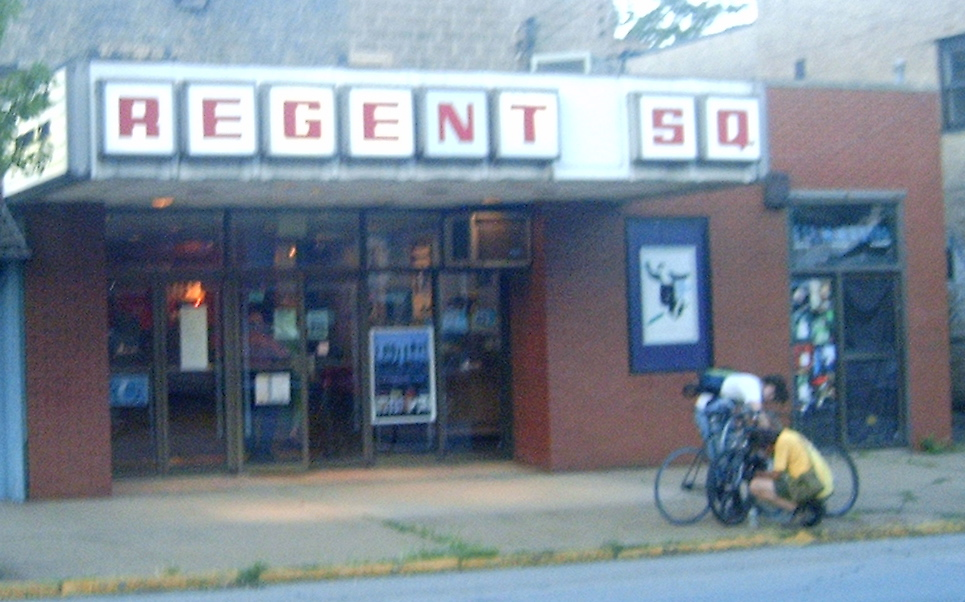
- The Regent Square Theatre on Braddock Avenue opened on December 14, 1936 and closed in December 2019

- Coordinates: 40.433°N 79.897°W
- Country: United States
- State: Pennsylvania
- County: Allegheny County
- City: Pittsburgh

Area
  - Total: 0.192 sq mi (0.50 km^{2})

Population (2010)
  - Total: 928
  - Density: 4,830/sq mi (1,870/km^{2})

Regent Square is a neighborhood in the East End of Pittsburgh, Pennsylvania, United States. According to its civic association, it "includes portions of the municipalities of Pittsburgh, Edgewood, Swissvale and Wilkinsburg". It is also the name of one of the 90 neighborhoods within the City of Pittsburgh's limits, which leads to some confusion among residents. In 2017, it was named the #1 neighborhood to live in Pittsburgh and the #17 best neighborhood in the United States by Niche.com.

The neighborhood is split between ZIP codes 15218 and 15221; the part of the neighborhood within the City of Pittsburgh is represented on the City Council by the council seat for District 5 (Southeast Neighborhoods). The neighborhood is a roughly rectangular plateau bounded on three sides by the steep valleys of Fern Hollow Creek to the west and Nine Mile Run to the south and east.

The tree-lined neighborhood is situated along both sides of Braddock Avenue between the Parkway East (I-376) and Forbes Avenue. The area of the present neighborhood was owned by a series of local landowners, including Col. Dunning McNair in the late 18th and Judge William Wilkins in the late 19th century. The name Regent Square was apparently bestowed by William E. Harmon of Harmon Realty, who in 1919 acquired most of the present neighborhood, then known as the Devon Plan. First calling it Regent Place, he later changed the name to Regent Square.

== Surrounding neighborhoods ==
Regent Square is bordered by the Pittsburgh neighborhoods of Point Breeze to the north, Squirrel Hill South to the west, and Swisshelm Park to the south; and by the boroughs of Swissvale to the southeast, Edgewood to the east, and Wilkinsburg to the northeast.

== See also ==
- List of Pittsburgh neighborhoods
