= Thomas Canning =

American composer (1911–1989)

- Born: December 12, 1911; Brookville, Pennsylvania
- Died: October 4, 1989 (aged 77)
- Education: Oberlin College; Eastman School of Music
- Occupations: Music educator and composer
- Children: Tom Canning
- Parent: James Scribner Canning

Thomas Canning (December 12, 1911 – October 4, 1989) was an American composer and music educator, serving as a professor of composition and music theory at the Eastman school and as composer-in-residence at West Virginia University. He also held appointments at Morningside College, Indiana University of Pennsylvania, and the Royal Conservatory of Music. In his composition work, he created music for specific occasions or ceremonies, focusing on hymns and choral works, and collaborated with poets Robert Frost and William Carlos Williams to create music in conjunction with their works. His best-known orchestral work, Fantasy on a Hymn by Justin Morgan (1944), was recorded by Leopold Stokowski and Howard Hanson.

== Early life and education ==
Canning was born in Brookville, Pennsylvania, on December 12, 1911. He was admitted at Oberlin College, where he studied composition under Normand Lockwood, receiving a B.M. in 1936. He received an M.A. from the Eastman School of Music in 1940, studying with Howard Hanson and Bernard Rogers.

== Career ==
After receiving his degree from Eastman, Canning taught music theory and composition at Morningside College (1936–1941) and Indiana University of Pennsylvania (1945–1946). In 1946, he took a position with The Royal Conservatory of Music at the University of Toronto, teaching music theory in the RCM's newly created MBac program for training secondary and elementary school music teachers. Canning was appointed assistant professor of Theory at Eastman in 1947 and taught there until 1961, when he left for a year to serve at the University of Hull as a Fulbright professor. In 1963 Canning was hired as an associate professor at the newly opened Creative Arts Center at West Virginia University, receiving promotion to full professor in 1967, retiring in 1977. Canning belonged to the American Composers Alliance, The Hymn Society of America, and Pi Kappa Lambda, and was an honorary member of Phi Mu Alpha Sinfonia.

== Selected works ==
Many of Canning's works were written for specific occasions or events, or as part of specific collaborations with poets and authors. These works include:

- Oh, Give Us Pleasure in the Flowers Today – a hymn setting to music a poem of the same name by Robert Frost.
- Covenant Service – a musical setting for John Wesley’s Watch-Night Service for the first Sunday of the New Year.
- Beyond Belief – A light opera, 'a fantastic satire of the atomic age and all its perils,' staged by the Eastman School in May, 1956, and favorably reviewed.

=== William Carlos Williams collaborations ===
Lesser-known works include his collaborations with William Carlos Williams:

- In 1948, Canning undertook, in collaboration with Williams, the development of an opera, Tituba’s Children, but the work was never performed. Williams later released the work as a play.
- In 1950, he collaborated with Williams on Rogation Sunday, performed by Linwood Music School to music written by Canning.

=== Fantasy on a Hymn Tune by Justin Morgan ===
Since much of Canning's work was written for specific occasions, few of his compositions were published or recorded, with one notable exception. Fantasy on a Hymn Tune by Justin Morgan was composed as a response to a piece by British composer Ralph Vaughan Williams, Fantasia on a Theme by Thomas Tallis. Canning's piece was based on Amanda, a hymn from the 1790s by early American hymn singer and composer Justin Morgan. Written in 1944 in Canning's home town of Brookville, Pennsylvania, Fantasy on a Hymn Tune was premiered by the Rochester Philharmonic Orchestra in 1946 as part of a program of new American music.

The best-known recording was done by Leopold Stokowski and the Houston Symphony Orchestra in 1959, for Everest Records, a new label which utilized a recording technology designed for film soundtracks. This approach increased bandwidth and minimized the hiss that was characteristic of the period's analog sound recordings, producing a record that was considered very advanced for its time. The Stokowski recording was re-mastered and reissued in 2010 in a DVD-audio format that was considered to be of a quality superior to the standard CD format, an unusual achievement for a recording first released in 1960. The re-release was characterized as a classic – lusher and … more expressive than anyone else.

A variety of American symphony orchestras subsequently performed the piece, including recordings by Jesus Lopez-Cobos and the Cincinnati Symphony Orchestra in 1997 (Telarc 80462), and by Raymond Leppard with the Indianapolis Symphony Orchestra in 1999 (Decca 458157). The piece was performed by the Denver Symphony Orchestra in May, 2011.

== Personal life ==
Canning was married and had two children. His wife was a vocalist who sang church music both professionally and as an amateur. His son, also named Thomas, is a professional musician and Grammy-nominated producer. Canning's father, James Scribner Canning, was an accomplished classical banjo performer. The Canning Banjo Collection and Archive at the National Music Museum was donated in 1988 by Thomas Canning and his wife in memory of Canning's parents.

== Legacy ==
In 1980, the Thomas Canning Composition Prize, was instituted to honor Canning at West Virginia University.

Musicians, teachers, and composers who studied with Canning include:

- Mark W. Phillips, distinguished professor of music at Ohio University – Athens
- W. Francis McBeth, composer of wind band works and professor of music at Ouachita Baptist University.
- Joseph Willcox Jenkins, a composer and Professor of Music at Duquesne University
- Charles Clement Fussell, a composer and music professor at Boston University
- William Winstead, principal bassoonist with the Cincinnati Symphony Orchestra, composer, and teacher at the University of Cincinnati College – Conservatory of Music.
