= Wightman School =

- U.S. National Register of Historic Places
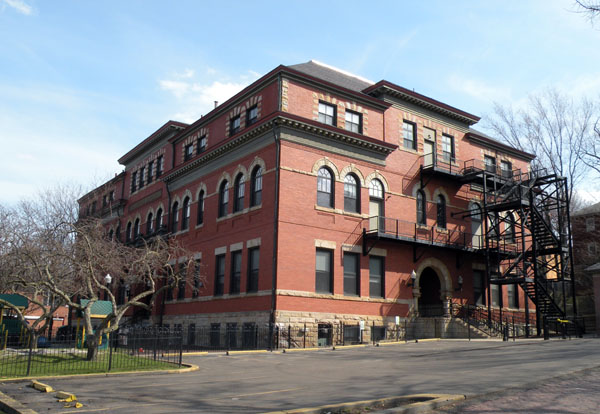

- Location within Pittsburgh Location within Pennsylvania Location within the United States
- Location: 5604 Solway St., Pittsburgh, Pennsylvania
- Coordinates: 40°26′33″N 79°55′37″W
- Area: 1 acre (0.40 ha)
- Built: 1897
- Architect: Ulysses J. Lincoln Peoples
- Architectural style: Classical Revival, Romanesque Revival
- MPS: Pittsburgh Public Schools TR
- NRHP reference No.: 86002717
- Added to NRHP: September 30, 1986

The Wightman School is a former elementary school and historic building in the Squirrel Hill neighborhood of Pittsburgh, Pennsylvania, United States. Built in 1897, it was listed on the National Register of Historic Places in 1986.

== History and architectural features ==
Originally an elementary school that was named Colfax No. 5, this historic building was subsequently renamed as the Wightman School in honor of Thomas Wightman, the owner of the Thomas Wightman Glass Company. The school operated from the time of its opening in 1897 until it was closed by the Pittsburgh Public Schools in June 1980.

Since 1981, this 40,000-square-foot space has been used as a community building, serving as the home base for several small businesses and nonprofit organizations.
