= Oakland Public School =

- U.S. National Register of Historic Places
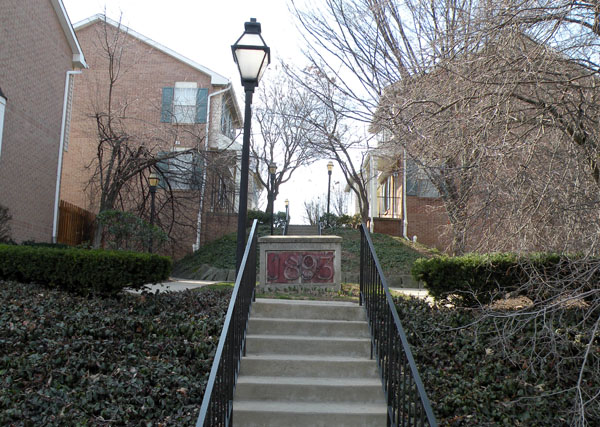
- The former site of Oakland Public School located at Dawson Street near Holmes Place

- Location within Pittsburgh Location within Pennsylvania Location within the United States
- Location: Dawson St. near Edith Pl., Pittsburgh, Pennsylvania
- Coordinates: 40°25′56″N 79°57′16″W
- Area: 1 acre (0.40 ha)
- Built: 1893
- Architect: Ulysses J. Lincoln Peoples
- Architectural style: Romanesque
- MPS: Pittsburgh Public Schools TR
- NRHP reference No.: 86002696
- Added to NRHP: February 3, 1987

The Oakland Public School, also known as the Holmes School, was a school in the South Oakland neighborhood of Pittsburgh, Pennsylvania was built in 1893 and expanded in 1899. It is believed that Ulysses J. Lincoln Peoples designed the building. It was listed on the National Register of Historic Places in 1987.

The school closed in 1986 and was demolished in 1987 to make room for the Holmes Place condominium development which now stands on the site.
