= Madison Elementary School (Pittsburgh, Pennsylvania) =

- U.S. National Register of Historic Places
- City of Pittsburgh Historic Structure
- Pittsburgh Landmark – PHLF
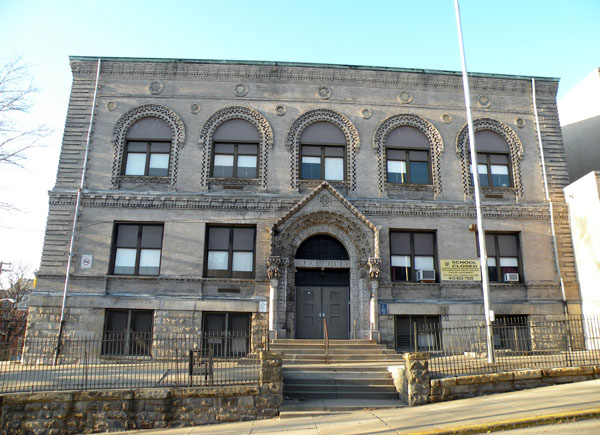

- Location within Pittsburgh Location within Pennsylvania Location within the United States
- Location: 3401 Milwaukee St., Pittsburgh, Pennsylvania
- Coordinates: 40°27′16″N 79°57′38″W
- Area: less than one acre
- Built: 1902
- Architect: Ulysses J. Lincoln Peoples; Pringle & Robling
- Architectural style: Art Deco, Romanesque
- MPS: Pittsburgh Public Schools TR
- NRHP reference No.: 86002687

Significant dates
- Added to NRHP: September 30, 1986
- Designated CPHS: November 30, 1999
- Designated PHLF: 2001

The Madison Elementary School is a former elementary school in the Upper Hill neighborhood of Pittsburgh, Pennsylvania, was built in 1902, and added to in 1929. The exterior features ornately decorated Romanesque-inspired doors and windows. It was listed on the National Register of Historic Places in 1986.
