= Ulysses J. Lincoln Peoples =

American architect

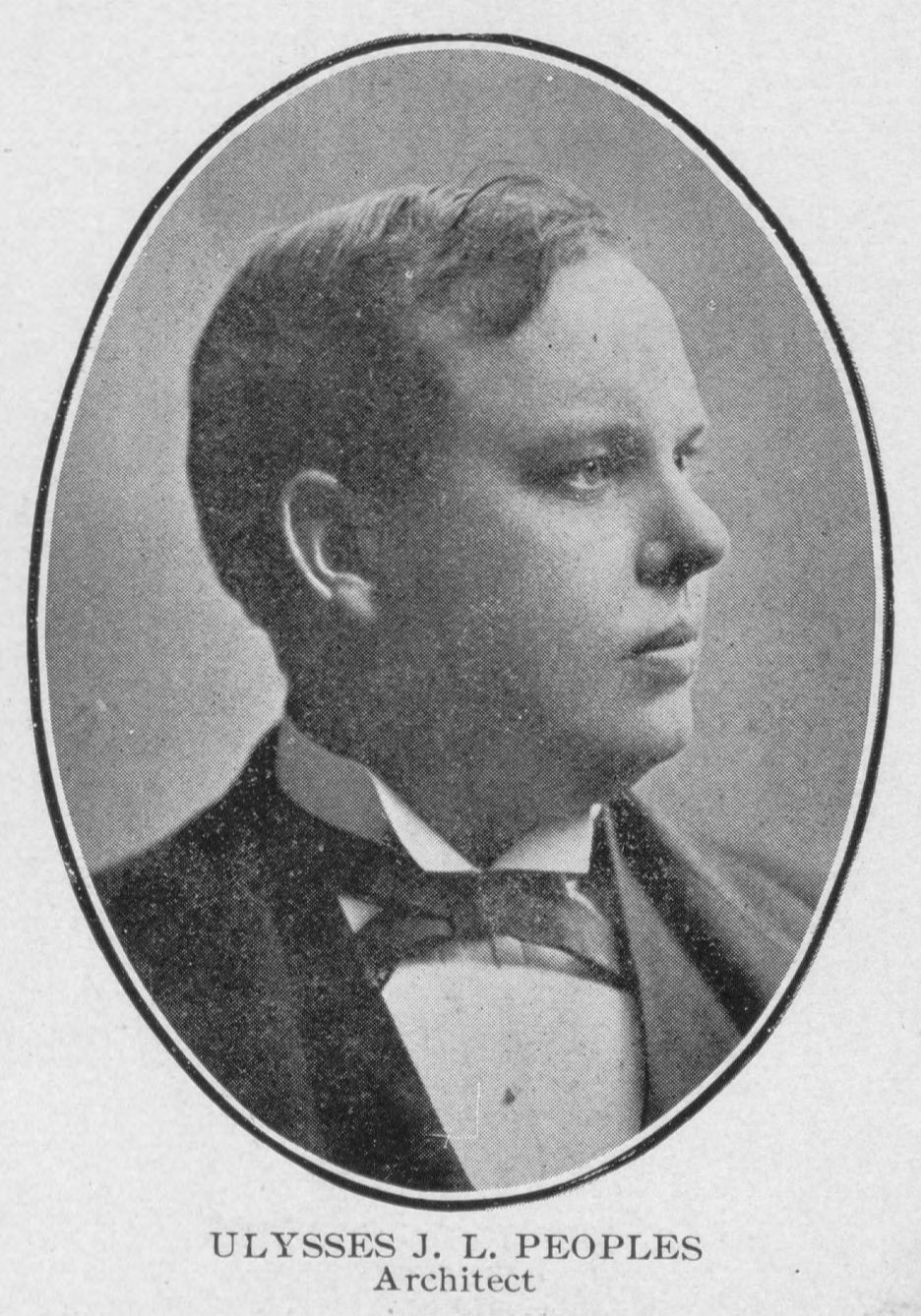
U. J. L. Peoples as depicted in Palmer's Pictorial Pittsburgh, 1905

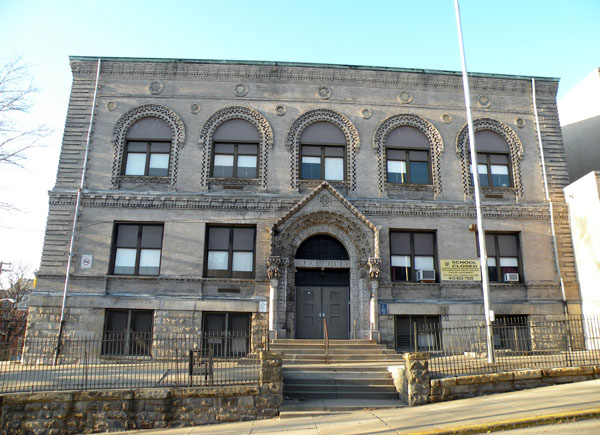
Madison Elementary School, Pittsburgh

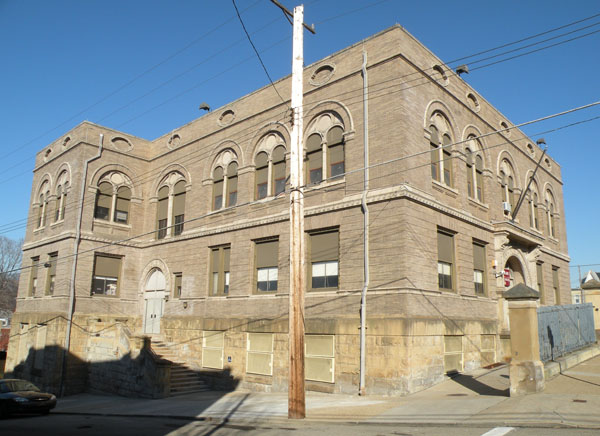
McCleary Elementary School, Pittsburgh

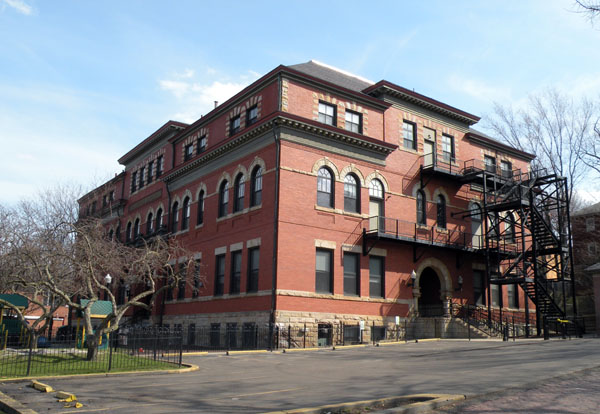
Wightman School, Pittsburgh

Ulysses J. Lincoln Peoples (February 17, 1865 - August 17, 1945) was an American architect based in Pittsburgh, Pennsylvania. Five schools located in Pittsburgh, Pennsylvania that were designed by Peoples have been listed on the National Register of Historic Places.

== Biography ==
Peoples was born in Allegheny, Pennsylvania, in 1865, the son of William and Elizabeth (Taylor) Peoples. William Peoples was a stair builder and author of Peoples' Pocket Stair-Builder and Carpentry Hand-Book.

At the time of the 1870 United States census, Peoples was living with his parents and three siblings in Allegheny. At the time of the 1880 United States census, Peoples was living in Chester, Pennsylvania. Peoples attended the University of Illinois Urbana-Champaign, graduating in 1890 with a degree in architecture. He worked in the office of Burnham and Root in Chicago as well as in Memphis and Fort Wayne, Indiana, before opening his own architecture practice in Pittsburgh. He married Emma Utz in 1891.

At the time of the 1900 United States census, Peoples was living in Pittsburgh with his wife Emma and daughter Edith. By the time of the 1910 Census, Peoples also had a son Ulysses Jr. He remained in Pittsburgh at the time of the 1920 and 1930 Censuses. By the time of the 1940 Census, Peoples and his wife Emma had relocated to Uniontown, Pennsylvania, where both were employed as taxi cab dispatchers. Peoples died in Uniontown in 1945.

== Works ==
Peoples' works include:

- Oakland Public School (1893), Dawson Street near Edith Place, Pittsburgh, Pennsylvania, NRHP-listed; demolished
- Larimer School (1896), Larimer Avenue at Winslow Street, Pittsburgh, Pennsylvania, NRHP-listed
- Wightman School (1897), (now Wightman School Community Building), 5604 Solway Street, Pittsburgh, Pennsylvania, NRHP-listed
- McCleary Elementary School (1900), Holmes Street and McCandless Avenue, Pittsburgh, Pennsylvania, NRHP-listed
- Madison Elementary School (1902), Milwaukee and Orion Streets, Pittsburgh, Pennsylvania, NRHP-listed
