= Children's Institute of Pittsburgh =

Pennsylvania organization

The Children's Institute of Pittsburgh is a nonprofit organization dedicated to children with special needs and their families in Western Pennsylvania and Pittsburgh, Pennsylvania, United States.

Mary Irwin Laughlin founded The Children's Institute in 1902 as the Memorial Home for Crippled Children to care for a six-year-old boy whose legs had been severed in a train accident. Later called The Rehabilitation Institute, the hospital at The Children's Institute, today, is a leader in pediatric rehabilitation techniques and provides individualized treatment programs along a broad continuum of care: outpatient care, transitional and subacute care, and home care. The Children's Institute also has The Day School, an accredited private school for students with special needs and a Therapeutic Garden, accessible to children at the Institute and the public.

The Children's Institute's main campus is located at 1405 Shady Avenue in the Squirrel Hill neighborhood of Pittsburgh, and the satellite facilities are located in Beaver County, Bridgeville, Greensburg, Irwin, and Washington County.

== Outpatient services ==
Outpatient services include occupational therapy, physical therapy, speech and language therapy, applied behavior analysis, hearing evaluation, home accessibility evaluation, neuropsychology evaluation, special equipment evaluation, assistive technology, and augmentative communication. Services vary by location.

== Therapeutic garden ==
On April 22, 2010, two dogwood trees were planted during the private ground-breaking ceremony for the Children's Institute of the Pittsburgh Nimick Family Therapeutic garden. The ceremony was conducted by the Nimick Family in honor of the late Florence and Tommy Nimick. Tommy and Florence Nimick devoted their lives to working with children at the Children's Institute in Squirrel Hill. The garden is a gift from the Nimick Forbesway Foundation to remember the Nimick's long-term leadership at the Institute. "The Nimick Family Therapeutic Garden will assist in teaching, stimulating and soothing patients and their families, as well as educators, therapists and neighbors of The Children's Institute." The garden is located near the front of the Squirrel Hill Campus along Shady Avenue. It hopes to feature: a tree house accessible by rope or ladder, a sun pavilion at the heart of the garden, various sculptures by world-famous sculptor Albert Guibara, a children's planting garden, and an engraved brick pathway throughout the garden. The therapeutic garden will not only be accessible to the families and their children at the Institute, but to the public.

=== Story behind the garden ===
The first garden at the Children's Institute was a victory garden in the 1900s. The Nimick garden took its place as the Institute's Therapeutic Garden. "The Nimick Family Therapeutic Garden will use the outdoors in a way we've not been able to before and will reflect our commitment to respond to all the needs of our patients and their families" quoted the then President and CEO, David K. Miles. Tommy Nimick was a member of the Men's Advisory Board at the Children's Institute and served on the board until his death in 2007. Florence Nimick was a long-term member of the Board of the Directors and served three terms as Board President at the Institute, which at the time was the Home for Crippled Children. She died in 1981. "We are proud to honor our parents in this way—and we believe that, if they were here, they would have made this gift themselves. The Children’s Institute was a great mutual interest for them, so much so that the three of us practically grew up there. As young children, we played and talked with staff and patients while our mother was signing papers, and later as teens my sister and I volunteered there."- Kit Nimick Carrasco.

=== Benefits of a therapeutic garden ===
Mind, body, and spirit are apparent themes from the Japanese Zen garden to the Monastic Cloister gardens that have been used throughout time for therapeutic reasons. The concept of unity is important in a therapeutic garden. A "healing garden" must have simplicity, sequence, balance, and variety. Roger Ulrich, a professor and director of the Center for Health Systems and Design at Texas A & M University, discovered that people who have access to viewing natural scenes or elements are able to overcome stressful feelings, reduce negative emotions, and help with attention disorders. Test subjects exhibited lower alpha rates, linked to becoming relaxed, when viewing natural settings such as gardens instead of urban settings. Ulrich also showed surgical patients who were able to view nature in the form of gardens had shorter post-operative stays, took less pain medication, and experienced fewer post-operative complications.

=== Garden sculptures ===
Albert Guibara's sculptures were selected to be featured in the Children's Institute's garden. A lifelong resident of San Francisco, California, Guibara is most recognized for his sculptures of: the rabbits and banyan tree at the Grand Cafe, a swaybacked horse at the Hotel Monaco in San Francisco, and the manini and donkey fish and the intertwined wiliwili trees at the Kukio Resort in Kona, Hawaii. Guibara's sculptures for the therapeutic garden include a sunflower trellis, frogs, and ducks.

== The Day School ==
The Day School at The Children's Institute of Pittsburgh is a private school that services children with disabilities such as autism, cerebral palsy, and brain damage. About 200 students, aged 5–21 years old, are currently enrolled. These students come from Allegheny and nearby counties. Transportation is provided by the students' parents or by the public school district in which the student resides. Students who are enrolled in the Day School are typically referred by their public school. The school day lasts from 8:30 a.m. to 3:00 p.m. and the school year lasts 180 days.

The Day School is an Approved Private School, which is licensed by the Pennsylvania Bureau of Private Academic Schools and is approved as a Special Education School by the Pennsylvania Department of Education. It is also fully accredited by the National Commission for the Accreditation of Special Education Services.

Many staff members hold master's degrees. Therapists are certified to work in Pennsylvania schools. The Day School's administrative staff holds certification as teachers, elementary or secondary school administrators, special education supervisors, or a combination of those credentials.

=== Services ===
Services are available for students, including: speech/language therapy, vision consultation, dietary services, psychological services, augmentative communication device therapy, hearing impaired resource therapy, functional feeding and oral motor therapy, occupational therapy, physical therapy, nursing services, and social work services.

The Day School has a gymnasium, a full-sized pool, a library, a sensory room, a multi-purpose room, and a treatment area for occupational, physical, and speech therapy.

=== Curriculum ===
Students have an individualized curriculum which aims to improve the students' life skills, in addition to teaching academic fundamentals, so that each student can learn to be independent. Parent involvement is encouraged. Students take adapted physical education, art, library, music, and (GYMBOP). The class integrates music and physical education, which incorporates physical, occupational, and speech/language therapies. Movement activities include: rolling, balancing, sitting, reaching, swaying, stretching, standing, and walking, with and without the aid of equipment such as walkers, scooters, gait trainers, tricycles, benches, and standers. Activities aimed toward improving communication skills include: locating sounds, making eye contact, tracking objects, pointing, using simple switches, and following directions.

United Staff of The Day School

During the 2020-2021 school year Day School staff moved to form a bargaining unit with the goal of improving staffing numbers and staff to student ratios, employee training, environmental improvements, and wages.

In May 2021, in a landslide vote, employees voted to unionize. The union, known as United Staff of The Day School (USTDS) consists of classroom teachers, paraprofessionals, therapists, and other Day School staff. USTDS is part of the American Federation of Teachers. The first union contract was ratified in May 2023.
