= Larimer School =

- U.S. National Register of Historic Places
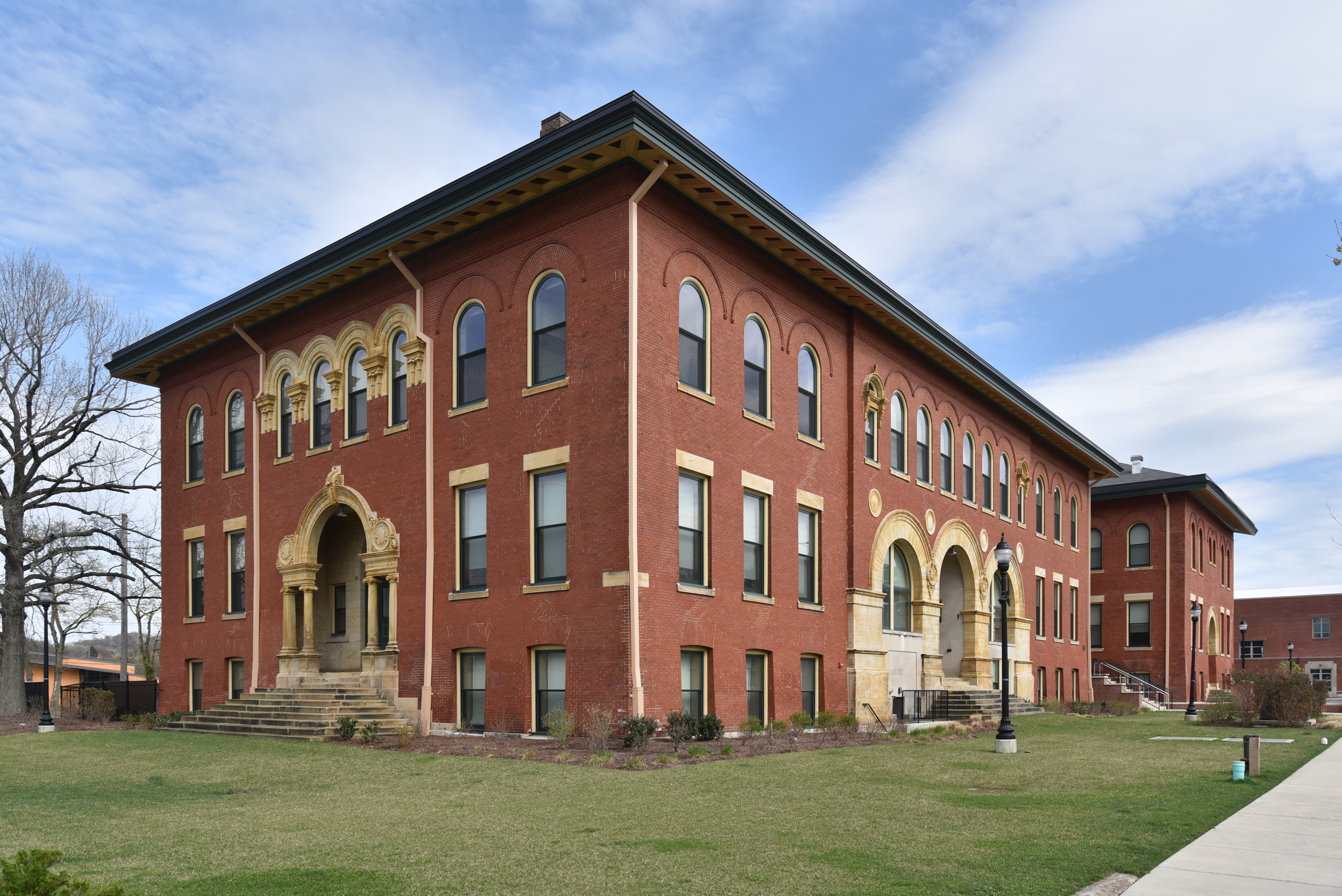
- Main building in 2025

- Location within Pittsburgh Location within Pennsylvania Location within the United States
- Location: Larimer Ave. at Winslow St., Pittsburgh, Pennsylvania
- Coordinates: 40°27′56″N 79°54′46″W
- Area: 1 acre (0.40 ha)
- Built: 1896
- Architect: Ulysses J. Lincoln Peoples; Rowland, George M.
- Architectural style: Renaissance, Art Deco
- MPS: Pittsburgh Public Schools TR
- NRHP reference No.: 86002675
- Added to NRHP: September 30, 1986

The Larimer School, which is located in the Larimer neighborhood of Pittsburgh, Pennsylvania, is an American school that was built in 1896.

The school closed in 1980 and remained vacant for about 40 years. In 2021–22, it was renovated into 35 mixed-income residential units.

== History and architectural features ==
An addition was made in 1904, and the auditorium and gymnasium were added in 1931. The interior includes terrazzo floors and marble wainscotting. The exterior includes an ornately decorated door on the southwestern side of the building (perhaps Romanesque-inspired Renaissance Revival) with statues on pillars, a bas-relief sculpture over the door, and human faces near a marble portion of the roof. It was listed on the National Register of Historic Places in 1986.
