= Summerset at Frick Park =

- Sub-neighborhood
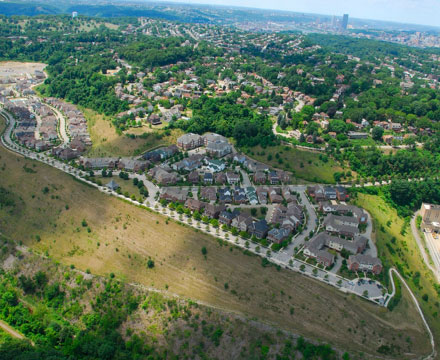
- An aerial view

- Location of Summerset in southern Squirrel Hill
- Coordinates: 40.42034°N 79.91506°W
- Country: United States
- State: Pennsylvania
- County: Allegheny County
- City: Pittsburgh
- Neighborhood: Squirrel Hill (Pittsburgh)

Summerset at Frick Park is a residential development located in the Squirrel Hill and Swisshelm Park neighborhoods within the City of Pittsburgh and Allegheny County. This project is one of the nation's first brownfield sites to be remediated for residential purposes. The $250 million public-project began in 1997 and is the City of Pittsburgh's largest residential development since World War II. At completion, Summerset at Frick Park will have over 700 residences and its annual property tax revenue is anticipated to be in the range of $5.7 million to $6.3 million.

== History ==
Summerset at Frick Park is located along the Monongahela River on the eastern side of Pittsburgh. The brownfield site sits on the edge of Squirrel Hill and from the 1920s to the 1970s was used to dump slag, a by-product of the steelmaking process. The development is adjacent to Frick Park, a 644-acre refuge that contains the area's largest urban stream, Nine Mile Run, which has been restored as part of the development. Phase 3 of the project, currently (2014) under construction, will be located primarily within the Swisshelm Park neighborhood. Summerset at Frick Park's proximity to Downtown Pittsburgh and Oakland, where many hospitals, medical facilities and universities are located, makes the reclamation of this area an important development for the city.

The project was spearheaded by 3-term Pittsburgh Mayor Tom Murphy. Mayor Murphy worked with the Urban Redevelopment Authority to begin the project in 1995 with the purchase of the land by the URA from a private entity for $3.8 million. A group of investors, developers and builders named the Summerset Land Development Association (SLDA) was formed, led by the locally based Rubinoff Company. The Rubinoff Company was given exclusive rights to create a master plan for the site and partnered with Montgomery & Rust, Pennrose Properties, Ralph A Falbo Inc. and EQA Landmark Communities to develop and build the community. Planning, engineering, architectural layout, landscape design and consulting services were provided by IBACOS, Kacin Company, LaQuatra Bonci Associates, Looney Ricks Kiss, GAI Consultants, Urban Design Associates and Zimmerman/Volk Associates.

Building began in 2001 and was guided by principles of New Urbanism as well as a model of the Traditional Neighborhood Development (TND) type. Some of the features of the neighborhood include shared green spaces and parks, rear alleyways, front porches on most structures, old-fashioned street lamps and picturesque stone walls. A community center, swimming pool, playground and basketball court create an urban community feel in the development.

== Building standards ==
Utilizing the standards for Green Building, the developers required that every unit built be at least 30 percent more efficient than typical new homes built in the Pittsburgh area.

Summerset at Frick Park's standards became instrumental in creating the base standards for both Energy Star and the EPA's “Build America” program. About 60 million dollars in public funds have been used for site preparation, water and sewer line installation, and road construction. SLDA purchases the lots from the URA and sells them to homebuilders.

== Future Development ==
In September 2014, the Pittsburgh Urban Redevelopment Authority sent a request for proposal to companies to assist the URA in preparing the third phase of the development. The project will be the final phase of the development, adding more homes and related infrastructure to the site, located in the Swisshelm Park neighborhood.
