= Gardner-Bailey House =

Historic house in Pennsylvania, United States

- U.S. National Register of Historic Places
- Pittsburgh Landmark – PHLF
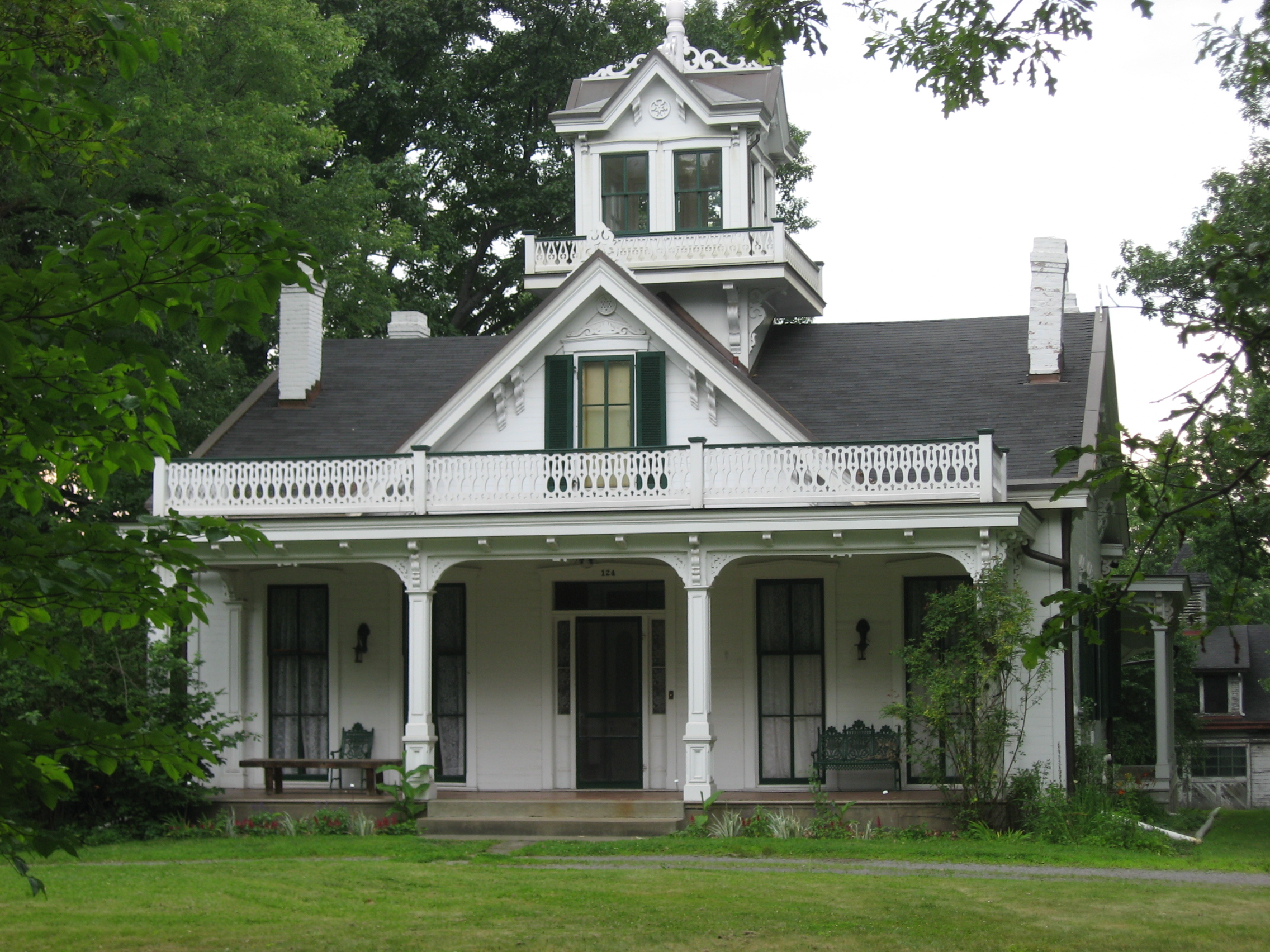

- Location within Pennsylvania Location within the United States
- Location: 124 West Swissvale Avenue, Edgewood, Allegheny County, Pennsylvania, USA
- Coordinates: 40°25′55″N 79°53′12″W
- Built: 1864
- Architectural style: Mixed (More Than 2 Styles From Different Periods)
- NRHP reference No.: 74001739

Significant dates
- Added to NRHP: October 1, 1974
- Designated PHLF: 1984

The Gardner-Bailey House at 124 West Swissvale Avenue in Edgewood, Allegheny County, Pennsylvania, was built in 1864. The house was added to the National Register of Historic Places on October 1, 1974, and the List of Pittsburgh History and Landmarks Foundation Historic Landmarks in 1984. The main section of the house has a square floor plan with four rooms on the first floor linked by a central hall, an extensive staircase, and three bedrooms and a bath on the second floor. A large dining room is directly to the rear and followed by a large kitchen with servant's quarters. A detached carriage house with turntable is located at the rear of the property.
