= American Specialty Toy Retailing Association =

The American Specialty Toy Retailing Association (ASTRA) is an organization of manufacturers, manufacturers representatives, distributors and retailers of specialty toys (as compared to mass market product).

The American Specialty Toy Retailing Association is a non-profit association that provides leadership and resources to grow the specialty toy industry. It is the largest association serving the specialty toy industry. ASTRA members build their businesses around specialty toys, which generally are designed with a focus on what the child can do, rather than what the toy can do.

== Neighborhood Toy Store Day ==
In 2010, ASTRA established Neighborhood Toy Store Day, to be observed on the second Saturday of each November.
