= St. Edmund's Academy =

Coordinates: 40.43709°N 79.92478°W

Location
- 5705 Darlington Ave Pittsburgh, PA; Pittsburgh, Pennsylvania

Information
- Type: independent nonsectarian primary and middle day school
- Established: 1947
- Head of School: Dr. Chad Barnett
- Faculty: 65
- Grades: PS – 8th
- Enrollment: 301
- Mascot: Wolf
- Endowment: $3 million
- Tuition: $12,600 PS/Pre-K $15,900 Kindergarten $18,750 1st – 4th $20,100 5th – 8th
- Affiliations: National Association of Independent Schools
- Website: stedmunds.net

St. Edmund's Academy is an independent nonsectarian coeducational primary and middle day school located in the Squirrel Hill neighborhood of Pittsburgh, Pennsylvania. Established in 1947, St. Edmund's offers programs from preschool through eighth grade. Although founded as an all-boys Episcopal school in association with the Episcopal Diocese of Pittsburgh, St. Edmund's no longer maintains a religious affiliation and accepts students of either sex and any religious background. The school is named after ninth-century king and martyr Edmund of East Anglia.

== History ==
St. Edmund's was founded as an all-boys diocesan school in 1947 by a group of parents associated with the Episcopal Church of the Redeemer in Squirrel Hill. The school came to occupy its current location in 1954 when Pauline Mudge, widow of prominent Pittsburgh industrialist Edmund W. Mudge, donated a plot of land adjacent to the parish house of the Church of the Redeemer. Though the school is in present-day no longer religiously affiliated, students still attend a weekly non-spiritual Chapel service in the Church of the Redeemer, in which they celebrate the secular community values of the school community.

== Academics ==
St. Edmund's curriculum offers preschool, pre-kindergarten, kindergarten, and first through eighth grade programs. All students wear a traditional school uniform including a white shirt, a tie for boys, and a traditional crimson blazer. The course of study at St. Edmund's is designed such that, by the time students finish the eighth grade, they are prepared to continue in a rigorous four-year college preparatory program. After graduating, St. Edmund's alumni commonly enroll in nearby independent Pittsburgh secondary schools—popular destinations include Shady Side Academy, The Ellis School, and Winchester Thurston School.

== Facilities ==
St. Edmund's Upper and Lower schools inhabit a three-level building connected by two skywalks. In addition to classrooms, St. Edmund's Academy contains two science labs, an auditorium, two art studios, a music room, a field house, two athletic fields, and a 12,000 volume library.

== Notable alumni ==
- Christian Borle, Tony Award and Drama Desk Award-nominated actor who has starred in the NBC drama Smash
- Peter Sellars, distinguished theatre director
