= Samuel Hazo =

Samuel Hazo may refer to:

- Samuel Hazo (writer), born 1928, poet, novelist and playwright.
- Samuel Hazo (composer), born 1966, concert band composer.
