= Edgewood, Allegheny County, Pennsylvania =

Borough in Pennsylvania, US

Edgewood, Pennsylvania
- Borough
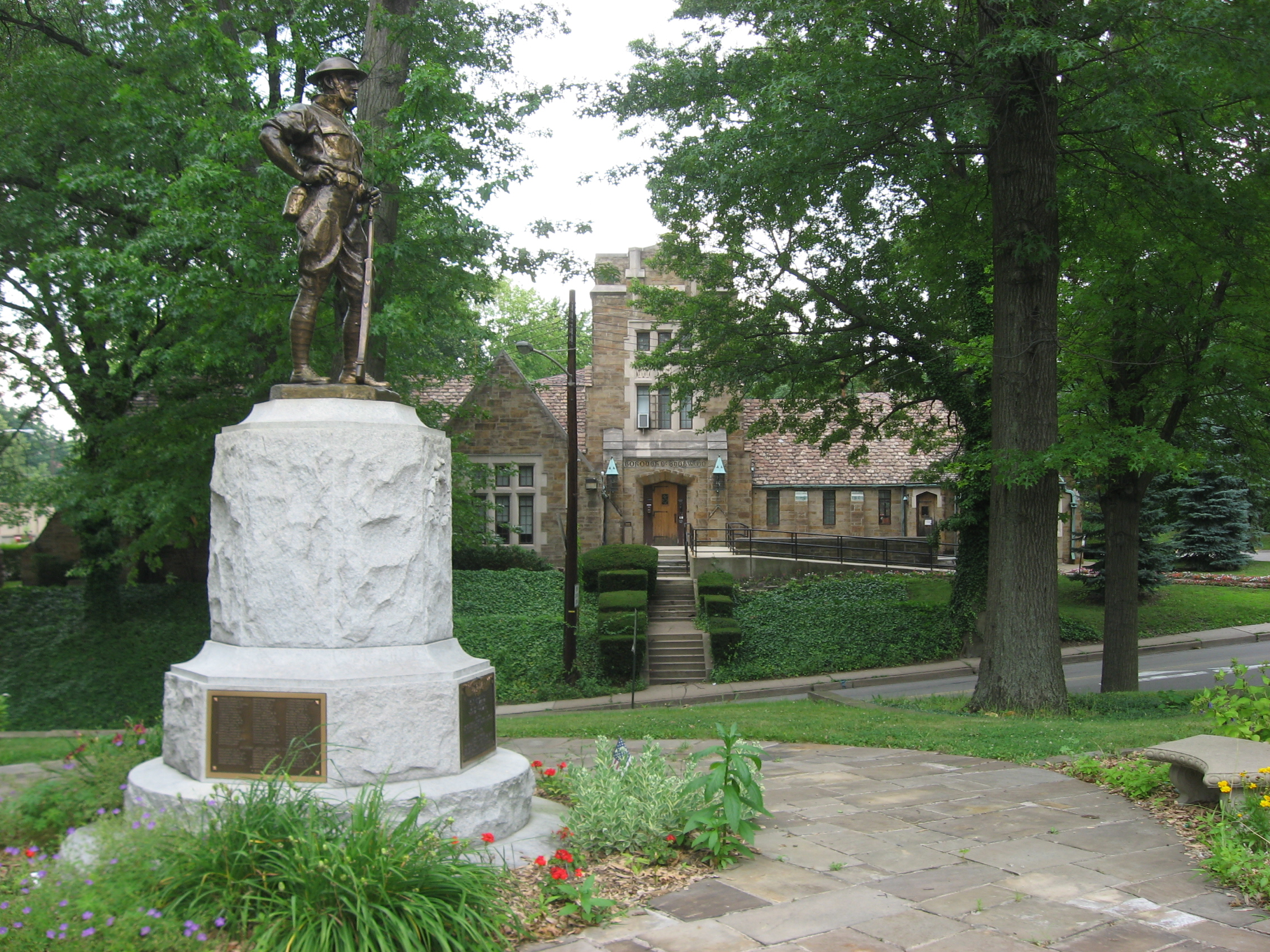
- Edgewood's municipal building with its World War I memorial in the foreground

- Location in Allegheny County and the state of Pennsylvania.
- Coordinates: 40°25′55″N 79°53′4″W
- Country: United States
- State: Pennsylvania
- County: Allegheny
- Incorporated: 1888-12-01

Government
  - Type: Mayor–council
  - Mayor: J. Edward Cook (D)

Area
  - Total: 0.59 sq mi (1.52 km^{2})
  - Land: 0.59 sq mi (1.52 km^{2})
  - Water: 0 sq mi (0.00 km^{2})
- Elevation: 978 ft (298 m)

Population (2020)
  - Total: 3,145
  - Density: 5,349.6/sq mi (2,065.49/km^{2})
- Time zone: UTC-5 (Eastern (EST))
  - Summer (DST): UTC-4 (EDT)
- ZIP code: 15218
- Area code: 412
- FIPS code: 42-22520
- GNIS feature ID: U.S. Geological Survey Geographic Names Information System: 1174013
- Website: www.edgewood.pgh.pa.us

Edgewood is a borough in Allegheny County, Pennsylvania, United States, adjacent to the city of Pittsburgh. The population was 3,145 at the 2020 census.

== History ==
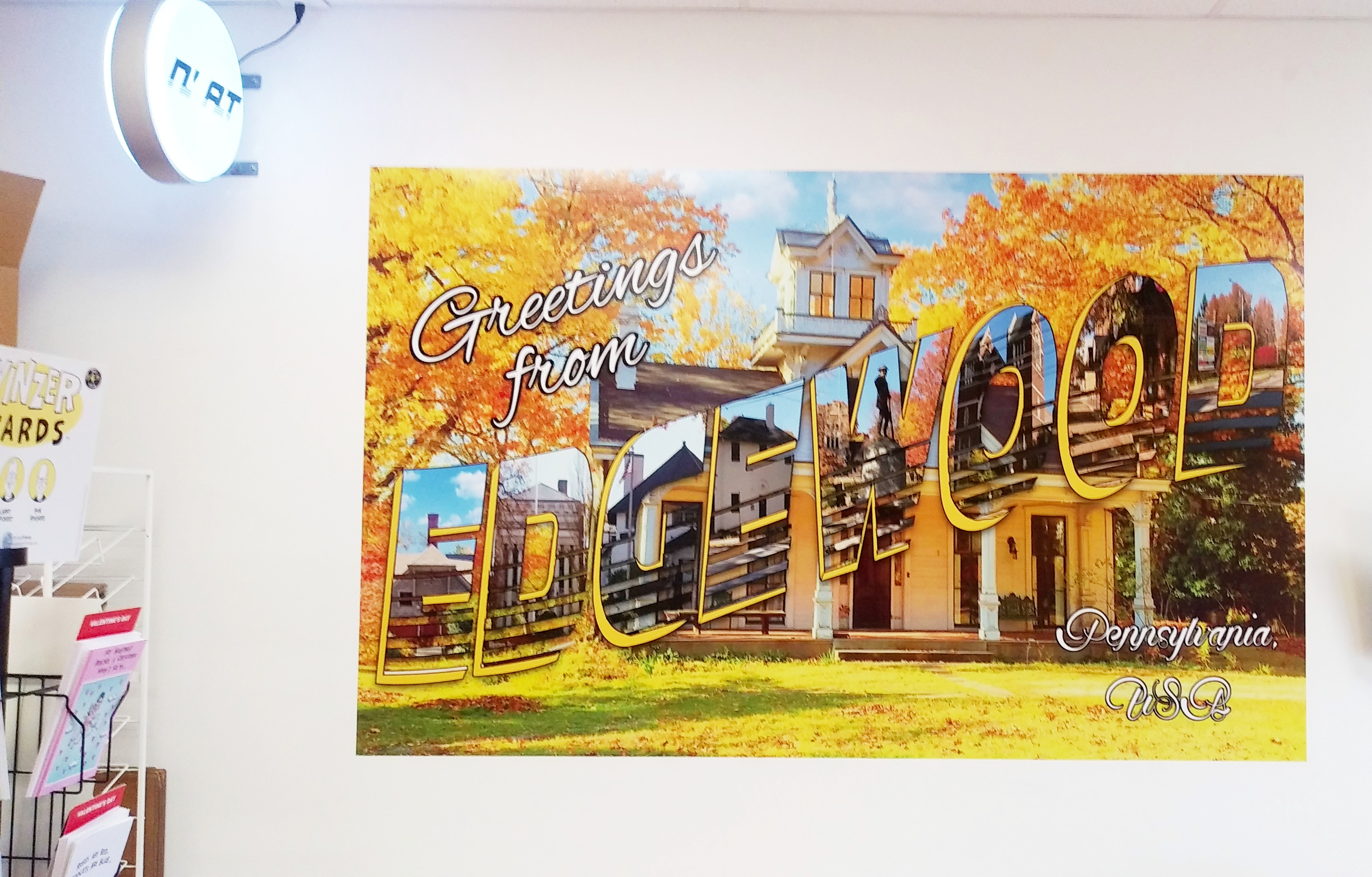
Edgewood Post Card Mural, located at Signs N' At, Edgewood Towne Centre

Edgewood was incorporated on December 1, 1888. Its historic landmarks include the Edgewood Borough Building where the police and fire service are also housed; the First Presbyterian Church of Edgewood; the Edgewood Community House which is home to both CC Mellor Memorial Library and the Edgewood Club; Memorial Park; Koenig Community Field and Field House; Edgewood Primary School (which was originally a K–12 in Edgewood's own district but was incorporated into the Woodland Hills School District merger in 1982, and most recently serves as a K–6 school building); and a historic train station. The Gardner-Bailey House is on the National Register of Historic Places.

Union Switch & Signal's primary factory was located near here for 106 years prior to its closure in 1986. Its site is currently being used as a shopping center, Edgewood Towne Centre, which was established in 1990.

== Geography ==
Edgewood is located at 40°25′55″N 79°53′4″W (40.431868, -79.884321).

According to the United States Census Bureau, the borough has a total area of 0.6 square miles (1.6 km^{2}), all land.

== Government and politics ==
Presidential elections results
Year	Republican	Democratic	Third parties
2020	13% 329	85% 2,025	0.6% 15
2016	15% 320	81% 1,695	4% 77
2012	26% 530	72% 1,452	2% 36

== Surrounding neighborhoods ==
Edgewood has four borders, including Wilkinsburg to the north, Braddock Hills to the east and southeast, Swissvale to the south and west, and the Pittsburgh neighborhood of Regent Square to the northwest.

== Demographics ==
Historical population
Census	Pop.	Note	%±
1880	218		—
1890	616		182.6%
1900	1,139		84.9%
1910	2,596		127.9%
1920	3,181		22.5%
1930	4,821		51.6%
1940	4,697		−2.6%
1950	5,292		12.7%
1960	5,124		−3.2%
1970	5,138		0.3%
1980	4,382		−14.7%
1990	3,581		−18.3%
2000	3,311		−7.5%
2010	3,118		−5.8%
2020	3,145		0.9%

=== 2010 census ===
At the 2010 census, there were 3,118 people residing in Edgewood, a decrease of 5.8% since 2000. Of that total, 85.1% (2,653) identified themselves as White, 9.3% (290) as Black or African American, 2.6% (81) as Asian, 0.3% (10) as American Indian and Alaska Native, 0.6% (19) as Other, and 2.1% (65) as Multiracial. There were 2.7% (84) of the population who identified as Hispanic or Latino (of any race).

=== 2000 census ===
At the 2000 census, there were 3,311 people, 1,639 households and 824 families residing in the borough. The population density was 5,600.2 inhabitants per square mile (2,162.2/km^{2}). There were 1,730 housing units at an average density of 2,926.1 per square mile (1,129.8/km^{2}). The racial makeup of the borough was 89.13% White, 7.85% African American, 0.12% Native American, 1.48% Asian, 0.09% Pacific Islander, 0.51% from other races, and 0.82% from two or more races. Hispanic or Latino of any race were 1.36% of the population.

There were 1,639 households, of which 19.5% had children under the age of 18 living with them, 39.3% were married couples living together, 8.4% had a female householder with no husband present, and 49.7% were non-families. 40.4% of all households were made up of individuals, and 9.9% had someone living alone who was 65 years of age or older. The average household size was 1.99 and the average family size was 2.75.

Age distribution was 17.4% under the age of 18, 7.1% from 18 to 24, 34.6% from 25 to 44, 27.0% from 45 to 64, and 13.9% who were 65 years of age or older. The median age was 40 years. For every 100 females, there were 85.8 males. For every 100 females age 18 and over, there were 81.1 males.

The median household income was $52,153, and the median family income was $68,281. Males had a median income of $47,292 versus $38,950 for females. The per capita income for the borough was $39,188. About 1.8% of families and 4.8% of the population were below the poverty line, including 8.0% of those under age 18 and 1.5% of those age 65 or over.

== Government ==
Edgewood is governed by a mayor and borough council under the administration of Mayor Ryan O’Donnell (D), who took office in 2017. The council is composed of seven members:

- Justin Petrolla (President)
- Bhavini Patel
- Brian Blasiole
- Mike Epitropoulos
- Moshe Sherman
- Tara Yaney
- Ben Love

== Education ==
Edgewood Borough is served by the Woodland Hills School District.

== Notable people ==
- Frances Arnold, Chemical Engineering and Biochemistry. Nobel Prize for Chemistry, 2018.
- David Conrad, actor
- Willard Rockwell, businessman
- James L. Swauger, archaeologist
- Jane Grey Swisshelm, abolitionist and leading figure of the early woman's movement
- George Westinghouse, inventor

== See also ==
- Edgewood Country Club
- Edgewood School District
- Woodland Hills School District
- Western Pennsylvania School for the Deaf

Preceded by Swissvale	Bordering communities of Pittsburgh	Succeeded by Wilkinsburg
