= Chatham University Arboretum =

Arboretum in Pittsburgh, Pennsylvania

Coordinates: 40.44757°N 79.92344°W

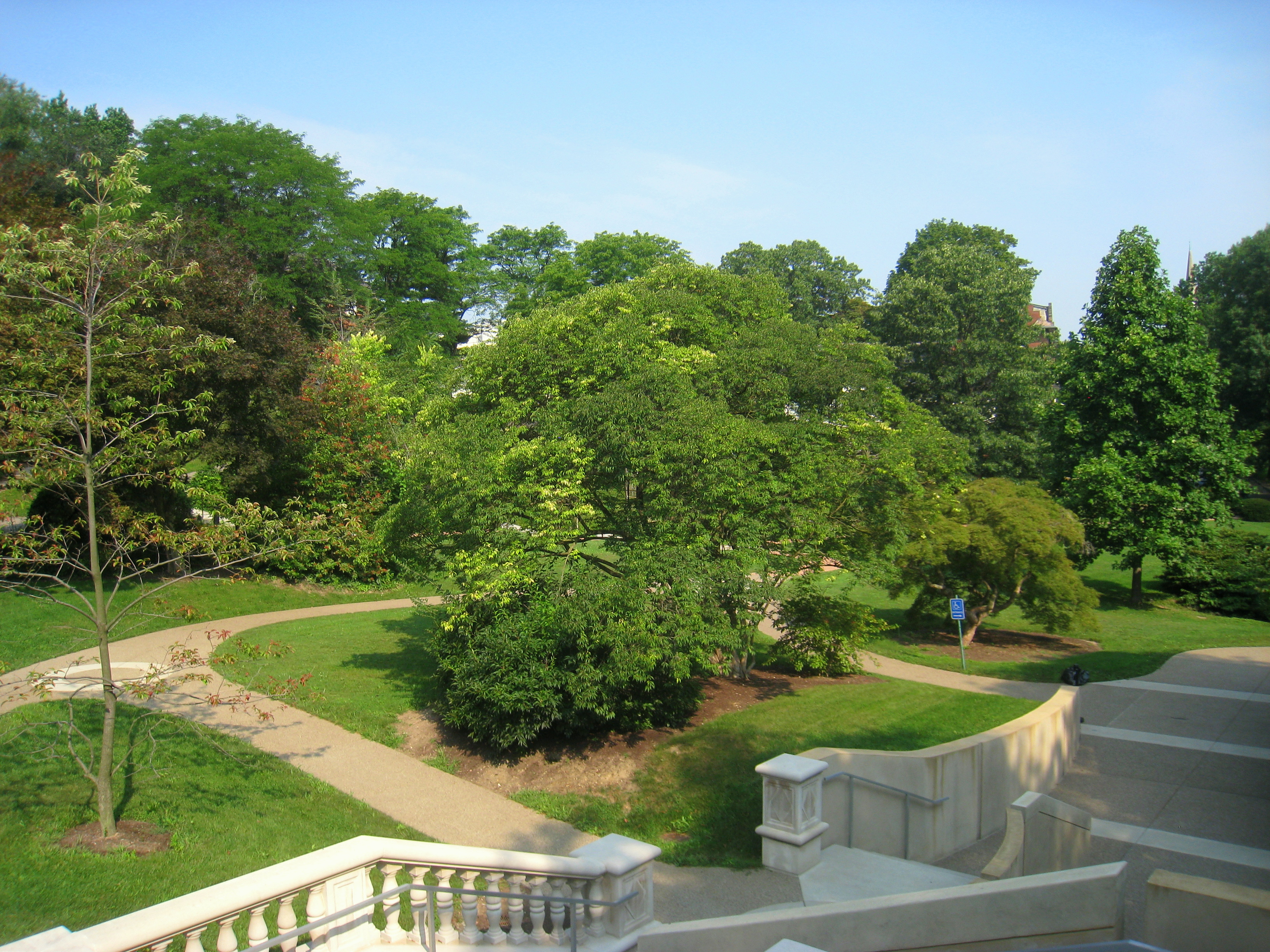
- Interactive map of Chatham University Arboretum
- Type: Arboretum
- Location: Pittsburgh, Pennsylvania
- Area: 32 acres (13 ha)
- Owner: Chatham University
- Species: 115
- Website: Official website

Chatham University Arboretum is a 32 acres (13 ha) arboretum located on the campus of Chatham University at Woodland Road, Pittsburgh, Pennsylvania, United States. It is open to the public daily without charge.

The arboretum was originally Andrew Mellon's estate, with portions designed by the Olmsted Brothers, landscape architects in the 1930s. It was designated an arboretum on November 9, 1998, and now contains approximate 100 types of trees, including Japanese flowering crabapple, river birch, and Kentucky coffee tree.

The Arboretum provides an outdoor classroom for students in Chatham's Landscape Architecture and Landscape Studies programs, as well as a place for walking and meditating.

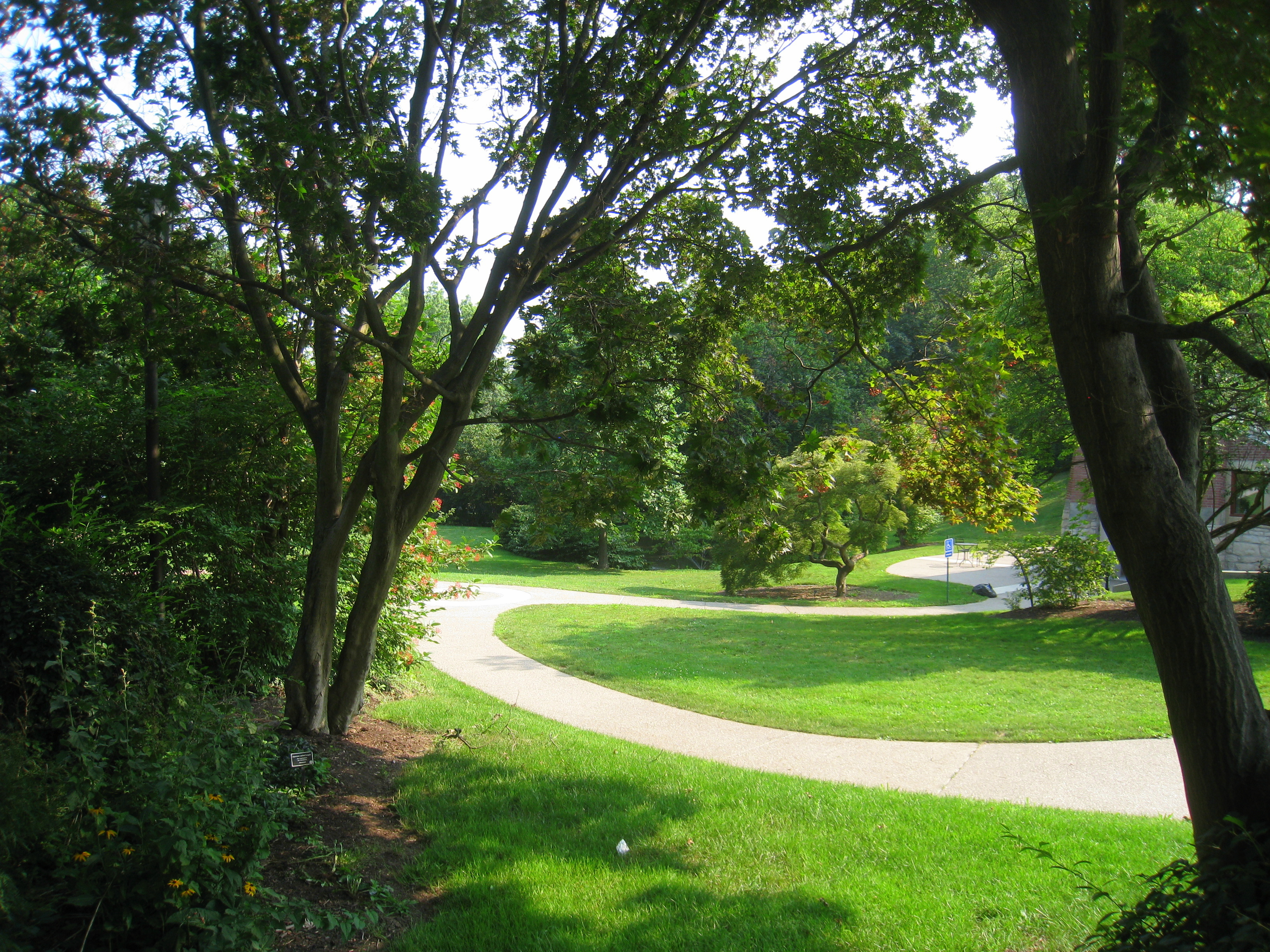
A pathway in the arboretum.

== See also ==
- List of botanical gardens in the United States
