= Leonard A. Funk Jr. =

United States Army Medal of Honor recipient

Leonard Alfred Funk Jr.
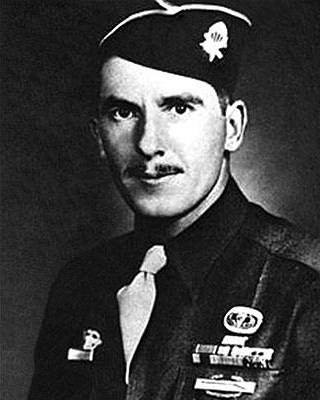
- First Sergeant Funk in c. 1945
- Born: August 27, 1916; Braddock Township, Pennsylvania, United States
- Died: November 20, 1992 (aged 76); Braddock Hills, Pennsylvania, United States
- Burial place: Arlington National Cemetery
- Military career
- Allegiance: United States
- Branch: United States Army
- Service years: 1941–1945
- Rank: First Sergeant
- Units: Company C, 1st Battalion, 508th Parachute Infantry Regiment
- Conflicts: World War II: Operation Overlord; Operation Market Garden; Battle of the Bulge
- Awards: Medal of Honor; Distinguished Service Cross; Silver Star; Bronze Star Medal; Purple Heart (3); Croix de guerre w/ palm (Belgium)

First Sergeant Leonard Alfred Funk Jr. (August 27, 1916 – November 20, 1992) was a United States Army Medal of Honor recipient and one of the most decorated soldiers and paratroopers of World War II. While serving with the 508th Parachute Infantry Regiment (508th PIR), then part of the 82nd Airborne Division, he also received the Distinguished Service Cross, Silver Star, Bronze Star Medal, and three Purple Hearts.

== Biography ==
Funk was born on August 27, 1916, in Braddock Township, Pennsylvania. His mother died when he was a small boy. After graduating high school in 1934 Funk worked as a clerk before being drafted.

=== World War II ===
Funk was drafted into the United States Army from Wilkinsburg, Pennsylvania, in June 1941. The following year, after the United States entered World War II, he volunteered for the paratroopers, part of the U.S. Army's newly created airborne forces. After completing his training and earning his jump wings, he was assigned to Company 'C' of the 1st Battalion, 508th Parachute Infantry Regiment (508th PIR), then stationed in Camp Blanding, Florida. He was to serve with the 508th throughout the war and went with the regiment to England in late 1943, where they became part of the veteran 82nd Airborne Division. He jumped into Normandy with the 508th on D-Day, 6 June 1944. It was during the Normandy action that Funk would receive his Silver Star.

Funk would next participate in the ill-fated Operation Market Garden parachuting into Holland on 17 September 1944. During the offensive Funk would lead a three-man team to destroy German anti-aircraft guns earning him the Distinguished Service Cross.

On 29 January 1945, during the Battle of the Bulge, he was serving as the first sergeant of his company in Holzheim, Belgium when he encountered a group of more than 80 German soldiers, most of whom had previously been captured by American forces but, with the help of a German patrol, had managed to overwhelm their guards. Despite being greatly outnumbered, Funk opened fire and called for the captured American guards to seize the Germans' weapons. He and the guards successfully killed or re-captured all of the German soldiers. By the end of the battle Funk was serving as interim company executive officer. For these actions, he was awarded the Medal of Honor on September 5, 1945.

Funk was honorably discharged in June 1945.

=== Post-war ===
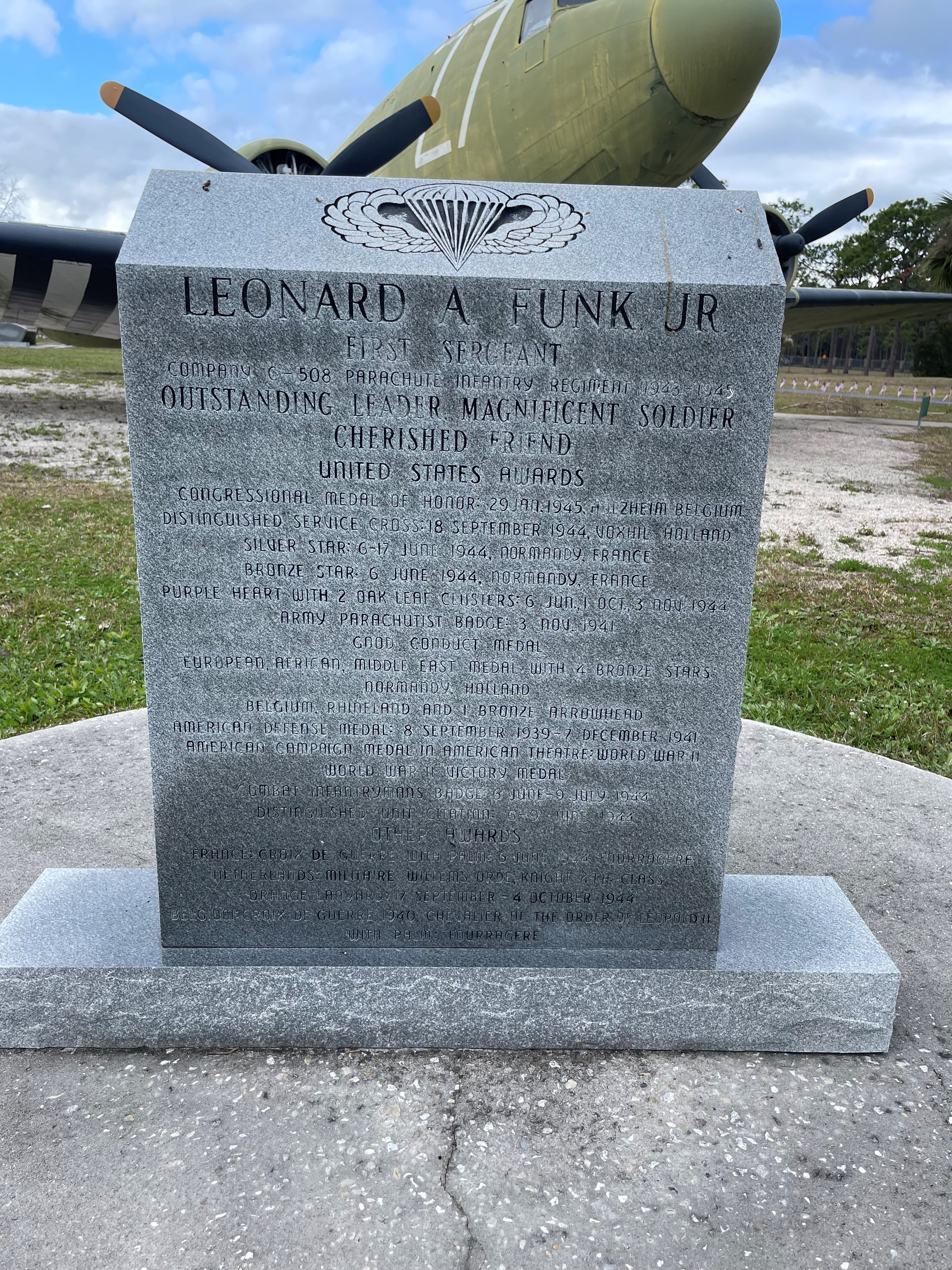
Cenotaph for 1SG Funk.

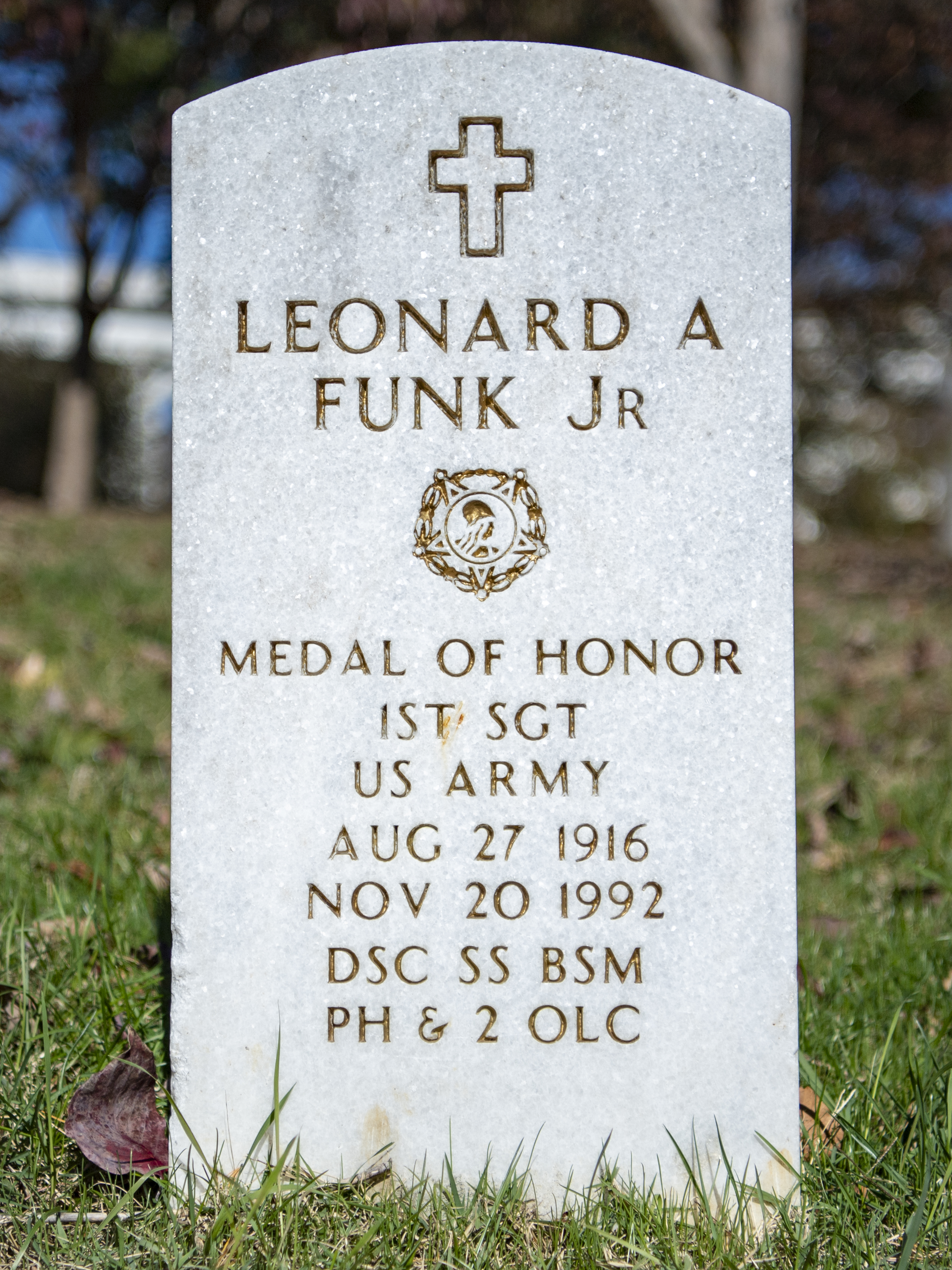
Leonard A. Funk Jr. gravestone at Arlington National Cemetery

Funk worked for the Veteran's Administration after the war and retired in 1972 as Division Chief with the Pittsburgh Regional Office. He had two daughters. In 1950 Funk was appointed an honorary First Lieutenant in the Army Reserves in recognition of his service as acting executive officer for Charlie Company during December 1944 and January 1945. He died at age 76 after a battle with cancer, and was buried in Arlington National Cemetery plot 35–2373–4, in Arlington County, Virginia. At the time of his death, he was the last living Medal of Honor recipient from the 82nd Airborne Division from World War II. A cenotaph was erected at the Camp Blanding Memorial Park after his death in recognition of his contributions to the 508th Parachute Infantry Regiment, which was stood up and trained at Camp Blanding. In 1995, a section of road where he lived was renamed the Leonard A. Funk Jr. Highway. In May 2018, he was inducted into the 82nd Airborne Division's Hall of Fame. On May 26, 2023, the McKeesport, Pennsylvania post office was dedicated to First Sergeant Leonard A. Funk Jr.

== Awards and decorations ==

Badge	Combat Infantryman Badge		
1st row	Medal of Honor		
2nd Row	Distinguished Service Cross	Silver Star	Bronze Star Medal
3rd Row	Purple Heart	Army Good Conduct Medal	American Defense Service Medal
4th Row	American Campaign Medal	European–African–Middle Eastern Campaign Medal with four campaign stars and arrowhead device	World War II Victory Medal
Badge	Parachutists Badge with two combat jump stars		
Unit awards	Presidential Unit Citation		

=== Medal of Honor ===
First Sergeant Funk's official Medal of Honor citation reads:

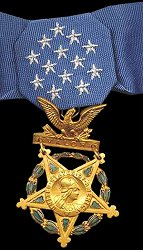
Medal of Honor

He distinguished himself by gallant, intrepid actions against the enemy. After advancing 15 miles in a driving snowstorm, the American force prepared to attack through waist-deep drifts. The company executive officer became a casualty, and 1st Sgt. Funk immediately assumed his duties, forming headquarters soldiers into a combat unit for an assault in the face of direct artillery shelling and harassing fire from the right flank. Under his skillful and courageous leadership, this miscellaneous group and the 3d Platoon attacked 15 houses, cleared them, and took 30 prisoners without suffering a casualty. The fierce drive of Company C quickly overran Holzheim, netting some 80 prisoners, who were placed under a 4-man guard, all that could be spared, while the rest of the understrength unit went about mopping up isolated points of resistance. An enemy patrol, by means of a ruse, succeeded in capturing the guards and freeing the prisoners, and had begun preparations to attack Company C from the rear when 1st Sgt. Funk walked around the building and into their midst. He was ordered to surrender by a German officer who pushed a machine pistol into his stomach. Although overwhelmingly outnumbered and facing almost certain death, 1st Sgt. Funk, pretending to comply with the order, began slowly to unsling his submachine gun from his shoulder and then, with lightning motion, brought the muzzle into line and riddled the German officer. He turned upon the other Germans, firing and shouting to the other Americans to seize the enemy's weapons. In the ensuing fight 21 Germans were killed, many wounded, and the remainder captured. 1st Sgt. Funk's bold action and heroic disregard for his own safety were directly responsible for the recapture of a vastly superior enemy force, which, if allowed to remain free, could have taken the widespread units of Company C by surprise and endangered the entire attack plan.

== See also ==
- List of Medal of Honor recipients
- List of Medal of Honor recipients for World War II
