= Braddock Hills, Pennsylvania =

Borough in Pennsylvania, US

- Borough
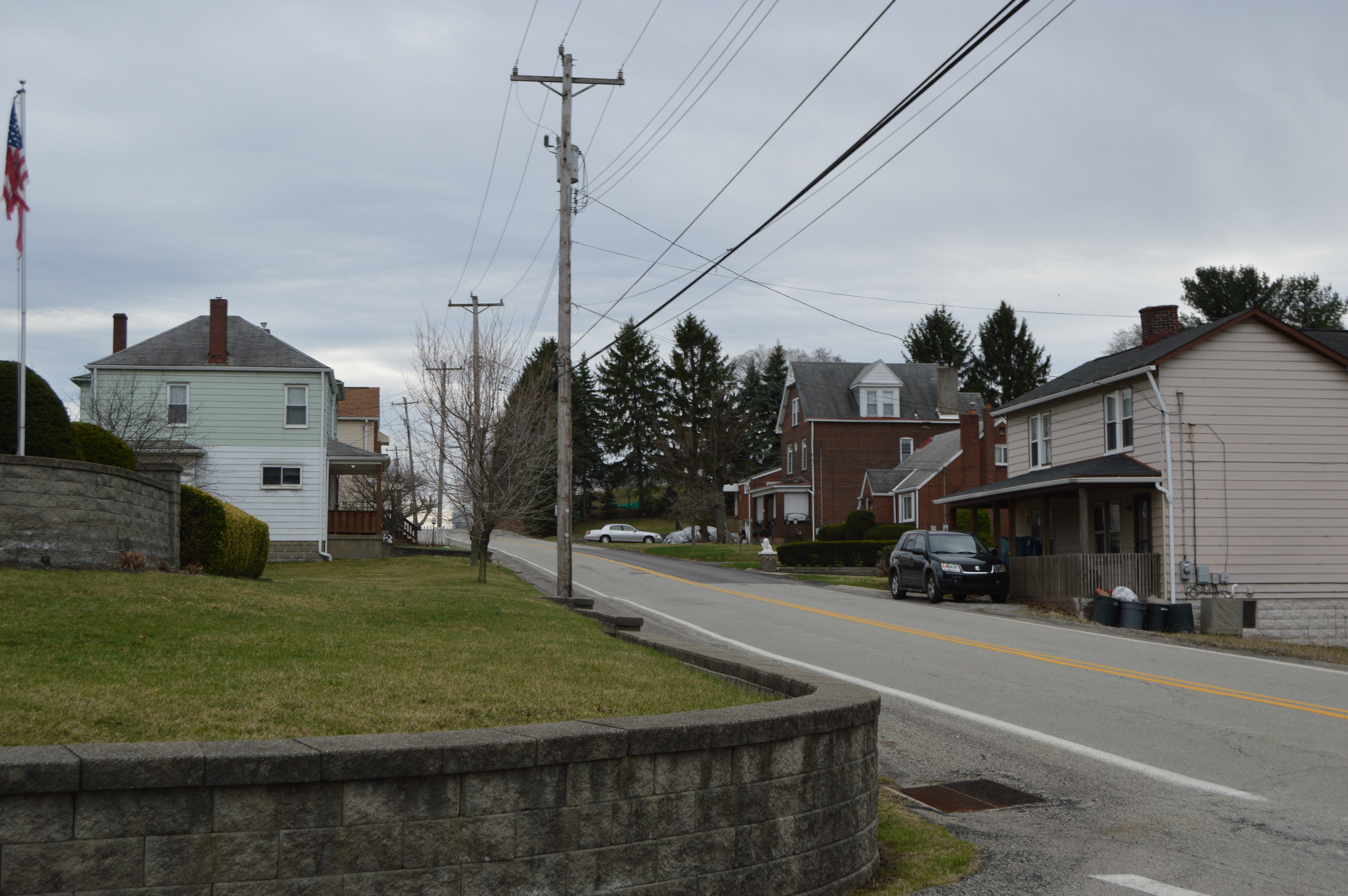
- Scene along Brinton Road
- Etymology: Edward Braddock
- Location in Allegheny County and the U.S. state of Pennsylvania.
- Coordinates: 40°25′12″N 79°51′57″W
- Country: United States
- State: Pennsylvania
- County: Allegheny
- Settled: 1753
- Incorporated: May 2, 1946

Government
  - Mayor: Jack Brown

Area
  - Total: 0.95 sq mi (2.47 km^{2})
  - Land: 0.95 sq mi (2.45 km^{2})
  - Water: 0.0077 sq mi (0.02 km^{2})
- Elevation: 1,102 ft (336 m)

Population (2020)
  - Total: 1,730
  - Density: 1,825.6/sq mi (704.87/km^{2})
- Time zone: UTC-5 (EST)
  - Summer (DST): UTC-4 (EDT)
- ZIP code: 15221
- Area code: 412
- FIPS code: 42-08008
- School District: Woodland Hills
- Website: http://www.braddockhillspa.com/

Braddock Hills is a borough in Allegheny County, Pennsylvania, United States. The population was 1,730 at the 2020 census. Braddock Hills is located approximately 8 miles (13 km) east of downtown Pittsburgh and is a residential suburb of the Pittsburgh metropolitan area.

== History ==
Braddock Hills is located northwest of Braddock's Field, the site of General Edward Braddock's 1755 defeat during the French and Indian War. The main road which winds through the borough, Brinton Road, was originally an Indian trail, used by the area's indigenous people to keep watch for their enemies. The other main road in the borough, Braddock Road, was the main link between Braddock Hills and Braddock used by farmers and coal miners. The first area of the borough to be settled was along Brinton Road, first settled as Hannatown.

First settled in 1753, the area was part of Wilkins Township until 1885, when Braddock Township was incorporated. On May 2, 1946, after Braddock Township had already been broken up into the boroughs of Swissvale, North Braddock, and Rankin, the remaining area incorporated itself as Braddock Hills.

Braddock Hills experienced a housing boom following World War II. Many GIs used their VA loans to acquire newly built homes. Most of the new homes were built on Illinois Ave, Park Ave, Columbia Ave, Circle Drive, McKelvey Ave, and Kings Road. These homes were generally small brick Cape Cods, colonials, or brick ranches. While much of the borough has new housing, there are many older structures. Miners built shotgun-style homes. Many of these homes were located on Indiana Avenue. Some are still in use.

Many older residents can recall when the Braddock Hills Shopping Center on Yost Boulevard was the location of a drive-in movie theater. The Ardmore Drive-In operated from 1959 to 1976; it was then torn down and was replaced with a shopping center. During the 1980s the shopping center's parking lot hosted a Sunday flea market and the Braddock Hills Days Festival.

Like many Western Pennsylvania communities, Braddock Hills was a coal town. There are many abandoned coal mines located throughout the town. This has resulted in sinkholes in an area that has been called the "coal fields". The coal fields are located in the center of the community.

Another prominent historical feature of the borough is the Braddock Catholic Cemetery. It served as the burying ground for many mill workers in the surrounding communities.

Braddock Hills was the home of Leonard A. Funk Jr., a Medal of Honor recipient. A monument dedicated to his exemplary service is located on Brinton Road in front of the senior citizens' building. It was also home to prominent residents, Kingsley and Velma Carey. Kingsley Carey was a member of the Tuskegee Airmen during World War II. In 2012, he was honored by the Veterans Leadership Program of Western Pennsylvania at Carnegie Hall. Velma Carey, wife of Kingsley Carey, was a popular jazz singer in Pittsburgh in the 1940s and 1950s. Velma Carey is believed to have been the first African American woman to appear on Pittsburgh television. She made an appearance on Arthur Godfrey's Talent Scouts television program.

Brinton Road is the longest street in this community.

== Geography ==
Braddock Hills is located at 40°25′12″N 79°51′57″W.

According to the United States Census Bureau, the borough has a total area of 1.0 square mile (2.6 km^{2}), all land. Its average elevation is 1,102 ft (336 m) above sea level.

=== Surrounding neighborhoods ===
Braddock Hills has five borders, including Wilkinsburg to the north, Forest Hills from the north-northeast to the east, North Braddock to the south, Swissvale to the west and southwest, and finally Edgewood to the west.

== Demographics ==
Historical population
Census	Pop.	Note	%±
1940	1,847		—
1950	1,965		6.4%
1960	2,414		22.8%
1970	2,459		1.9%
1980	2,556		3.9%
1990	2,026		−20.7%
2000	1,998		−1.4%
2010	1,880		−5.9%
2020	1,730		−8.0%

As of the census of 2000, there were 1,998 people, 1,020 households, and 513 families residing in the borough. The population density was 2,060.4 inhabitants per square mile (795.5/km^{2}). There were 1,077 housing units at an average density of 1,110.6 per square mile (428.8/km^{2}). The racial makeup of the borough was 79.38% White, 17.97% African American, 0.30% Native American, 0.45% Asian, 0.15% from other races, and 1.75% from two or more races. Hispanic or Latino of any race were 0.55% of the population.

There were 1,020 households, out of which 19.7% had children under the age of 18 living with them, 33.2% were married couples living together, 13.1% had a female householder with no husband present, and 49.7% were non-families. 46.8% of all households were made up of individuals, and 27.5% had someone living alone who was 65 years of age or older. The average household size was 1.94 and the average family size was 2.76.

In the borough the population was spread out, with 18.6% under the age of 18, 6.6% from 18 to 24, 23.8% from 25 to 44, 22.7% from 45 to 64, and 28.3% who were 65 years of age or older. The median age was 46 years. For every 100 females there were 80.3 males. For every 100 females age 18 and over, there were 74.8 males.

The median income for a household in the borough was $30,382, and the median income for a family was $40,517. Males had a median income of $32,434 versus $24,009 for females. The per capita income for the borough was $18,545. About 10.2% of families and 13.1% of the population were below the poverty line, including 16.3% of those under age 18 and 12.1% of those age 65 or over.

== Government and politics ==
Presidential Elections Results
Year	Republican	Democratic	Third Parties
2020	28% 289	69% 693	1% 15
2016	31% 280	66% 598	3% 33
2012	30% 276	68% 625	2% 17

Braddock Hills is governed by a borough council headed by an elected mayor, who manages legislative and executive responsibilities. The borough is part of Pennsylvania’s 34th State House District, currently represented by Abigail Salisbury., and part of Pennsylvania’s 14th Congressional District.

== Education ==
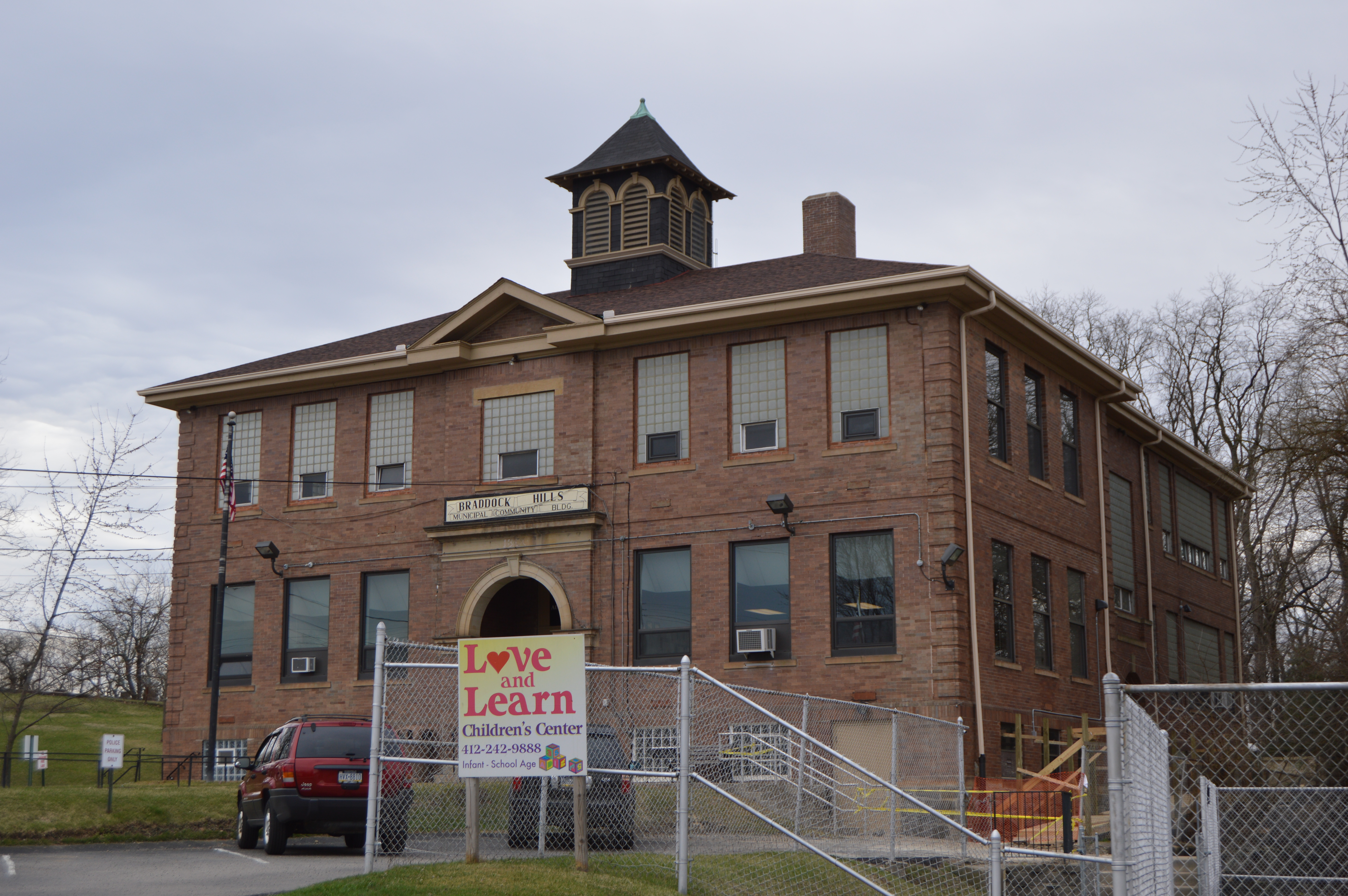
Former school

It is in the Woodland Hills School District.

The area along Brinton Road, Hannatown, had its own one-room schoolhouse, which eventually became a small brick elementary school known as Braddock Hills Elementary, on land donated by the Hanna family, that grew until 1966, when a court mandate combined the educational system of Braddock Hills with that of the neighboring borough of Swissvale. Braddock Hills Elementary closed its doors in 1978. It would soon be converted into a community center that would house the police department and a daycare center. In 1981, the Swissvale Area School District combined, after court ordered desegregation, even further to form the Woodland Hills School District that serves Braddock Hills today.

The public high school for the borough is Woodland Hills High School. The Community College of Allegheny County's Braddock Hills Center is also located in the borough.
