= 508th Infantry Regiment =

508th Parachute Infantry Regiment (508th PIR) 508th Airborne Infantry Regiment (508th AIR) 508th Infantry Regiment (508th IR)
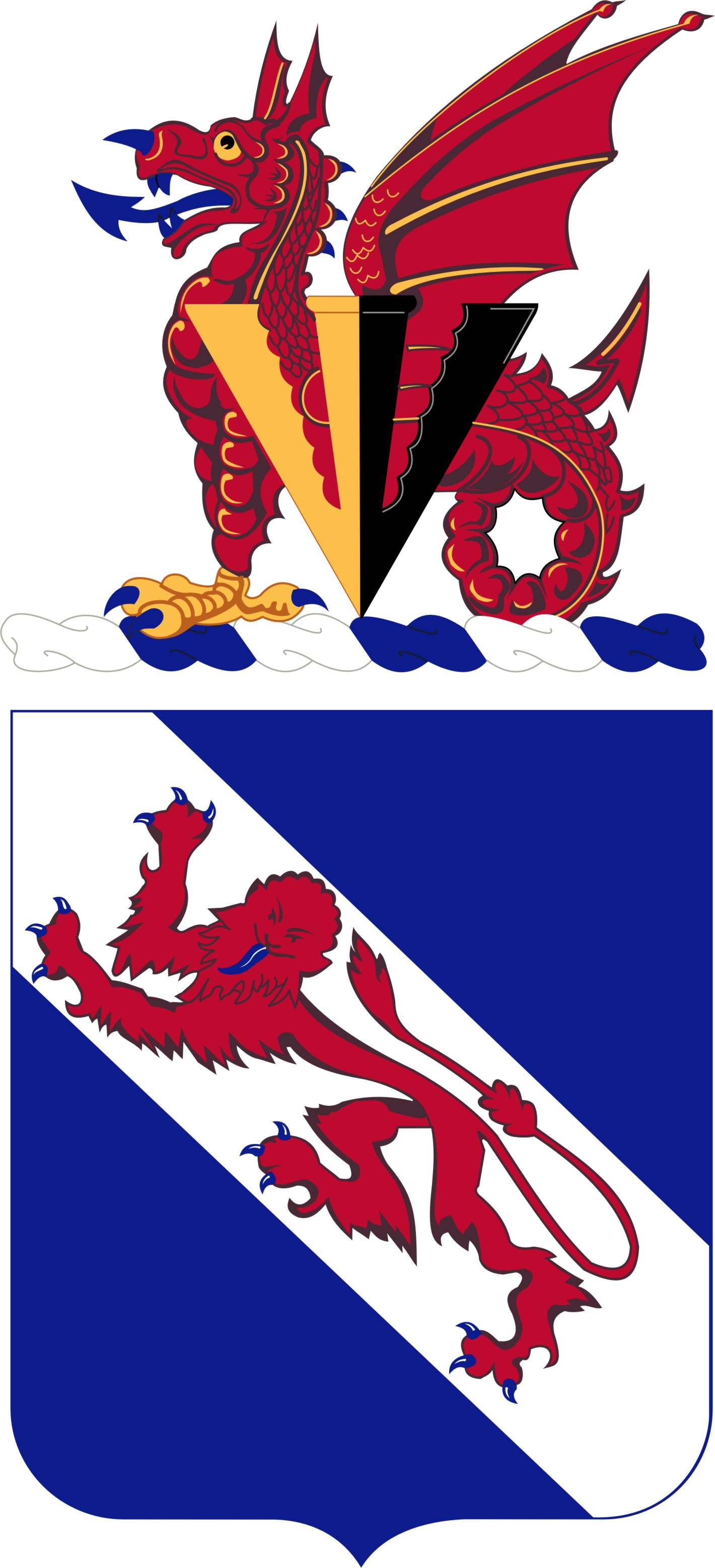
- 508th Infantry Regiment coat of arms.
- Active: 1942–1946; 1951–1957; 1962–present
- Country: United States
- Branch: United States Army
- Garrison/HQ: Fort Bragg, NC
- Nickname: Red Devils
- Motto: Fury From the Sky
- Engagements: World War II; Dominican Civil War; Invasion of Grenada; TWA Flight 847 hijacking; Achille Lauro hijacking; Operation Prime Chance; Operation Just Cause; Operation Uphold Democracy; Yugoslav Wars; Stabilisation Force in Bosnia and Herzegovina; War on terror; Operation Enduring Freedom; Iraq War; Al-Qaeda insurgency in Yemen; War in North-West Pakistan; Maersk Alabama hijacking; Operation Neptune Spear; 2013 raid on Barawe; Operation Inherent Resolve; Operation Freedom's Sentinel

Commanders
- Current commander: LTC Phil Waggoner (1st Battalion) and LTC Thomas Whitfield II (2nd Battalion)
- Notable commanders: Colonel Roy E. Lindquist

Insignia
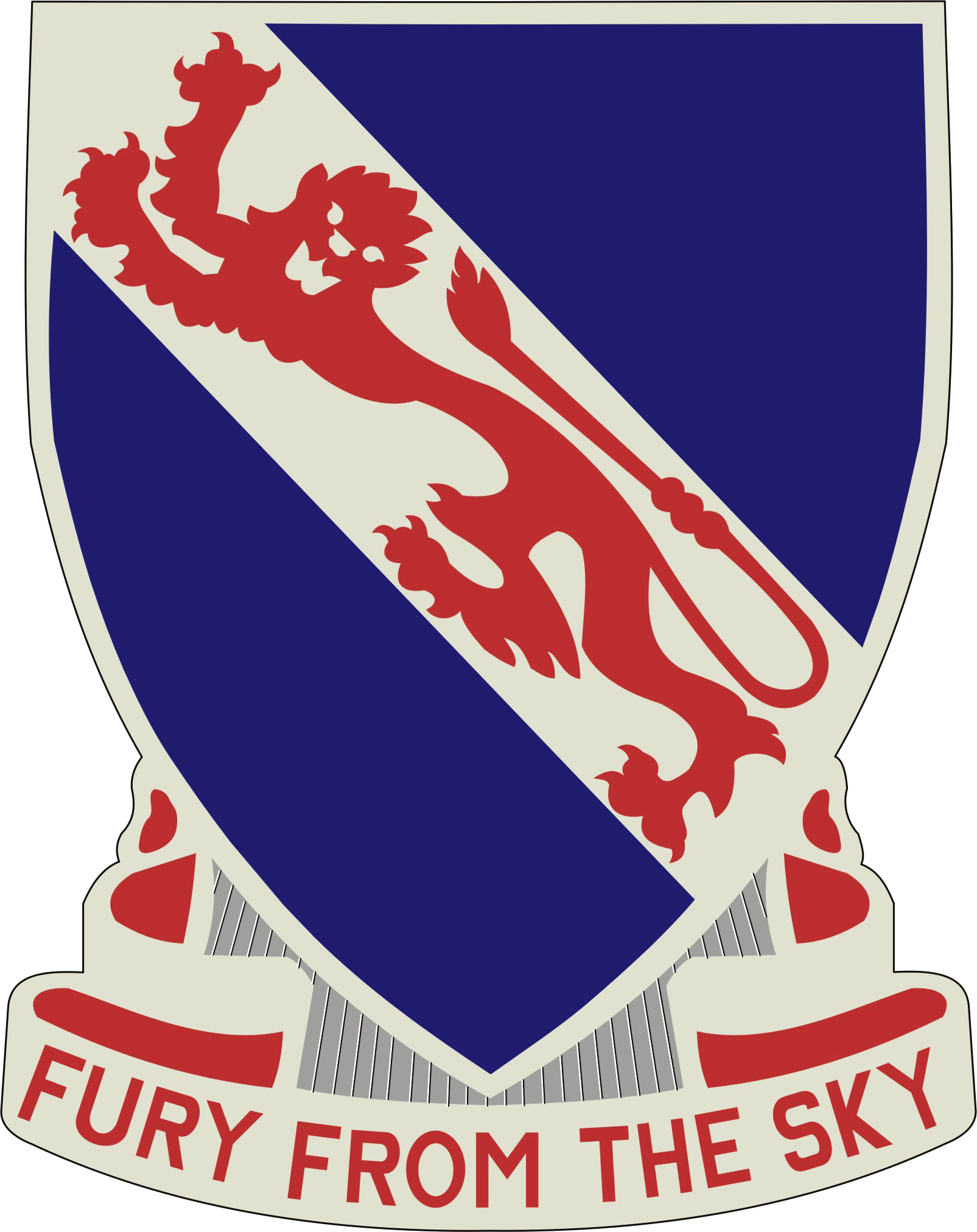
- Distinctive unit insignia

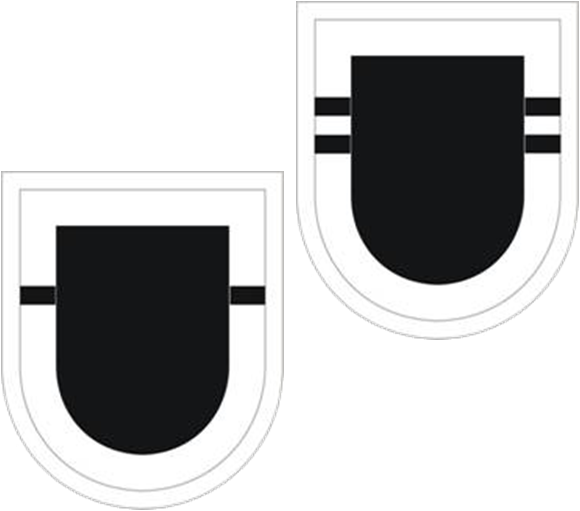
- Unit beret flashes of the 1st and 2nd Battalions, 508th Infantry Regiment

The 508th Infantry Regiment (508th PIR, 508th AIR, or 508th IR) ("Red Devils" or "Fury from the Sky") is an airborne infantry regiment of the United States Army, first formed in October 1942 during World War II. The 508th is a parent regiment under the U.S. Army Regimental System, and two battalions from the regiment are currently active: the 1st Battalion, 508th Parachute Infantry Regiment (1-508th PIR) is assigned to the 3rd Brigade Combat Team, 82nd Airborne Division, and the 2nd Battalion, 508th Parachute Infantry Regiment (2-508th PIR) is assigned to the 2nd Brigade Combat Team, 82nd Airborne Division. The regiment served in combat during World War II, and regimental elements have served in combat in the Dominican Republic, Vietnam, Grenada, Panama, Iraq and Afghanistan.

== History ==
=== World War II ===
The 508th Parachute Infantry Regiment (508th PIR) was activated during World War II on 20 October 1942 at Camp Blanding, Florida. Lieutenant Colonel Roy E. Lindquist formed the unit and remained its commander throughout the war.

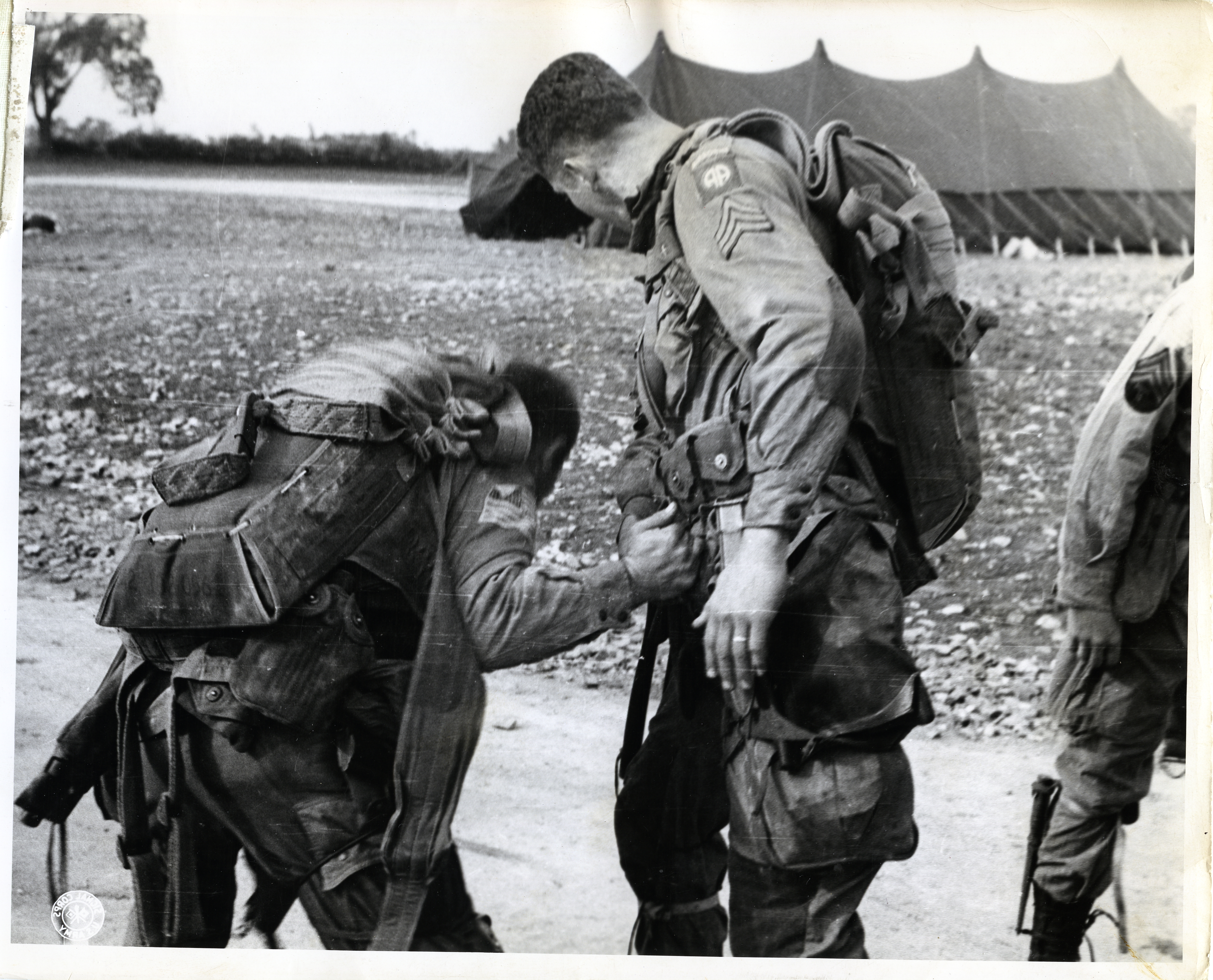
Members of the 508th PIR, 82nd Airborne Division, check their equipment before taking off from an airfield in Saltby, Leicestershire, England, to participate in the invasion of Europe, 1944.

After extensive training and maneuvers the 508th embarked on 19 December 1943 in New York City, New York and sailed on 28 December 1943 for Belfast, Northern Ireland, arriving there on 8 January 1944. After additional training at Cromore Estate in Portstewart, the regiment was moved by ship to Glasgow in Scotland and by train on 13 March 1944 to Wollaton Park in Nottinghamshire, England, where they became part of the veteran 82nd "All American" Airborne Division, commanded by Major General Matthew Ridgway, which had seen distinguished service in Sicily and Italy. A sister unit, the 507th Parachute Infantry Regiment (later to become attached to the 17th Airborne Division), who were part of the 2nd Airborne Brigade with the 508th, were camped less than ten miles away at a former country hotel called Tollerton Hall, Nottinghamshire. During training in England Brigadier General James M. Gavin, the Assistant Division Commander (ADC), was particularly impressed with the regiment, noting that the 508th "looks as good as any new outfit that I have ever seen, if they cannot do it it cannot be done by green troops."

The 508th Parachute Infantry Regiment participated in Operation Overlord, jumping into Normandy at 2:15 a.m. on 6 June 1944. The 82nd objectives were to capture Sainte-Mère-Église, secure crossings at the Merderet River near La Fiere and Chef-du-Pont, and establish a defensive line north from Neuville-au-Plain to Breuzeville-au-Plain. There they were to tie in with the 502nd Parachute Infantry, of Major General Maxwell Taylor's 101st Airborne Division. Like most paratroop units involved in Overlord, the 508th were dropped in the wrong locations and had extraordinary difficulty linking up with each other.

Portions of the 508th regrouped and remained in contact with German forces until relieved on 7 July when they became the divisional reserve force. On 13 July, they were transported back to England in two LSTs and returned to their station at Wollaton Park. Of the 2,056 paratroopers of the regiment who participated in the D-Day landings, only 995 returned. The 508th PIR had, by this time, suffered 1,061 casualties, out of an initial strength on D-Day of 2,056. Of those, 307 had been killed in action, including the commanding officer (CO) of the 1st Battalion, Lieutenant Colonel Herbert F. Batchellor, the highest-ranking officer to lose his life in the regiment.

For its gallantry and combat action during the first three days of fighting, the unit was awarded the Distinguished Unit Citation (later re-designated the Presidential Unit Citation), quoted in part below:

The 508th Parachute Infantry is cited for outstanding performance of duty in action against the enemy between 6 and 9 June 1944, during the invasion of France. The Regiment landed by parachute shortly after 0200 hours, 6 June 1944. Intense antiaircraft and machine-gun fire was directed against the approaching planes and parachutist drops. Enemy mobile anti-airborne landing groups immediately engaged assembled elements of the Regiment and reinforced their opposition with heavily supported reserve units. Elements of the Regiment seized Hill 30, in the wedge between the Merderet and Douve Rivers, and fought vastly superior enemy forces for three days. From this position, they continually threatened German units moving in from the west, as well as the enemy forces opposing the crossing of our troops over the Merderet near La Fiere and Chef-du-Pont. They likewise denied the enemy opportunity to throw reinforcements to the east where they could oppose the beach landings. The troops on Hill 30 finally broke through to join the airborne troops at the bridgehead west of La Fiere on 9 June 1944. They had repelled continuous attacks from infantry, tanks, mortars, and artillery for more than 60 hours without resupply. Other elements of the 508th Parachute Infantry fought courageously in the bitter fighting west of the Merderet River and in winning the bridgeheads across that river at La Fiere and Chef-du-Pont. The regiment secured its objectives through heroic determination and initiative. Every member performed his duties with exemplary aggressiveness and superior skill. The courage and devotion to duty shown by members of the 508th Parachute Infantry are worthy of emulation and reflect the highest traditions of the Army of the United States.

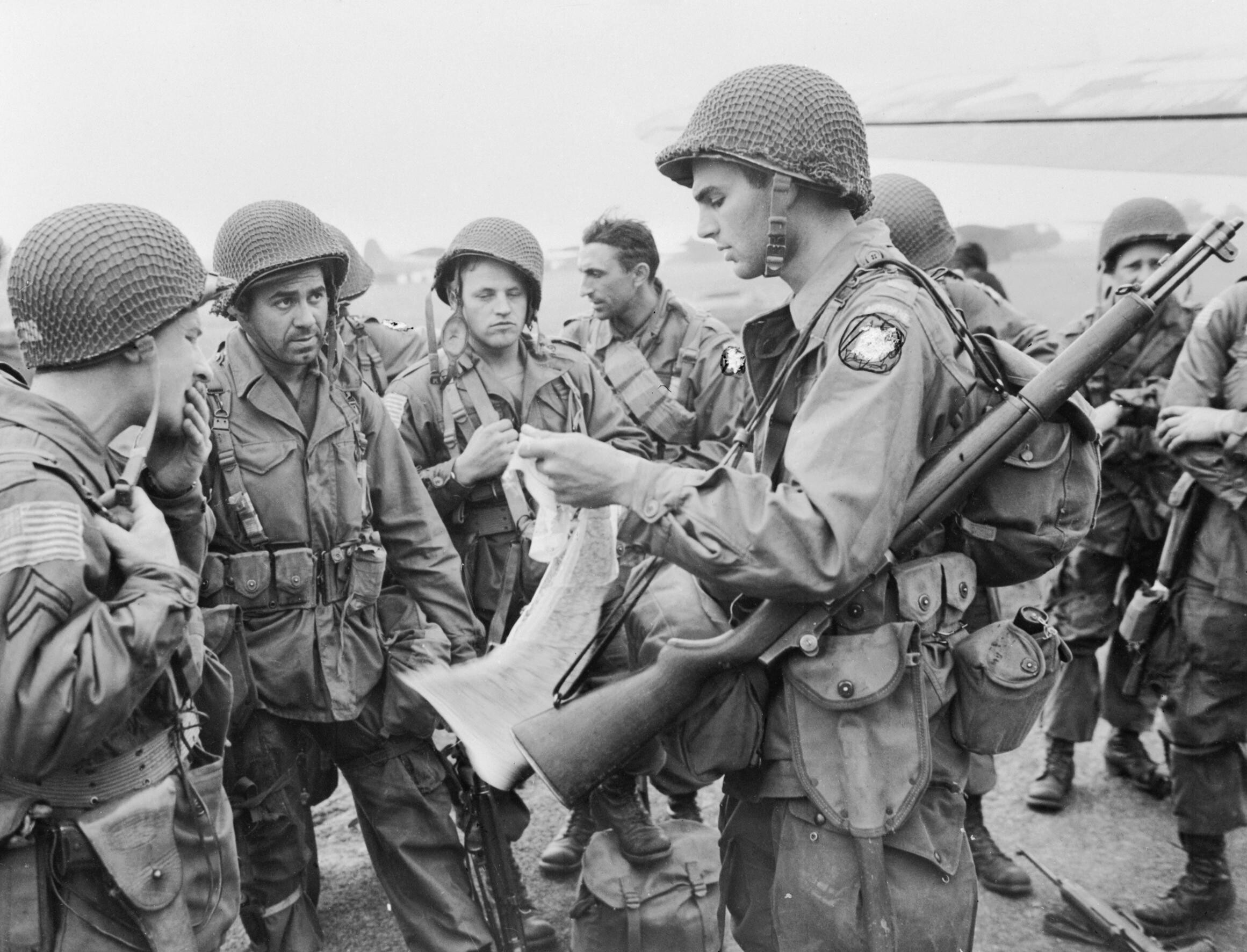
Men of the 508th PIR during Operation Market Garden, 17 September 1944.

After their success in Normandy, the 508th PIR returned to its billet at Wollaton Park and prepared for its part in Operation Market Garden, jumping on 17 September 1944. The regiment established and maintained a defensive position over 12,000 yards (11,000 m) in length, with German troops on three sides of their position. They seized a key bridge and prevented its destruction. Other units prevented the demolition of the Waal river Bridge at Nijmegen. The regiment additionally seized, occupied, organized, and defended the Berg en Dal hill mass, terrain which controlled the Groesbeek-Nijmegen area. They cut Highway K, preventing the movement of enemy reserves, or escape of enemy along this important international route. After being relieved in the Netherlands, they continued fighting the Germans in the longest-running battle on German soil ever fought by the U.S. Army, then crossed the border into Belgium.

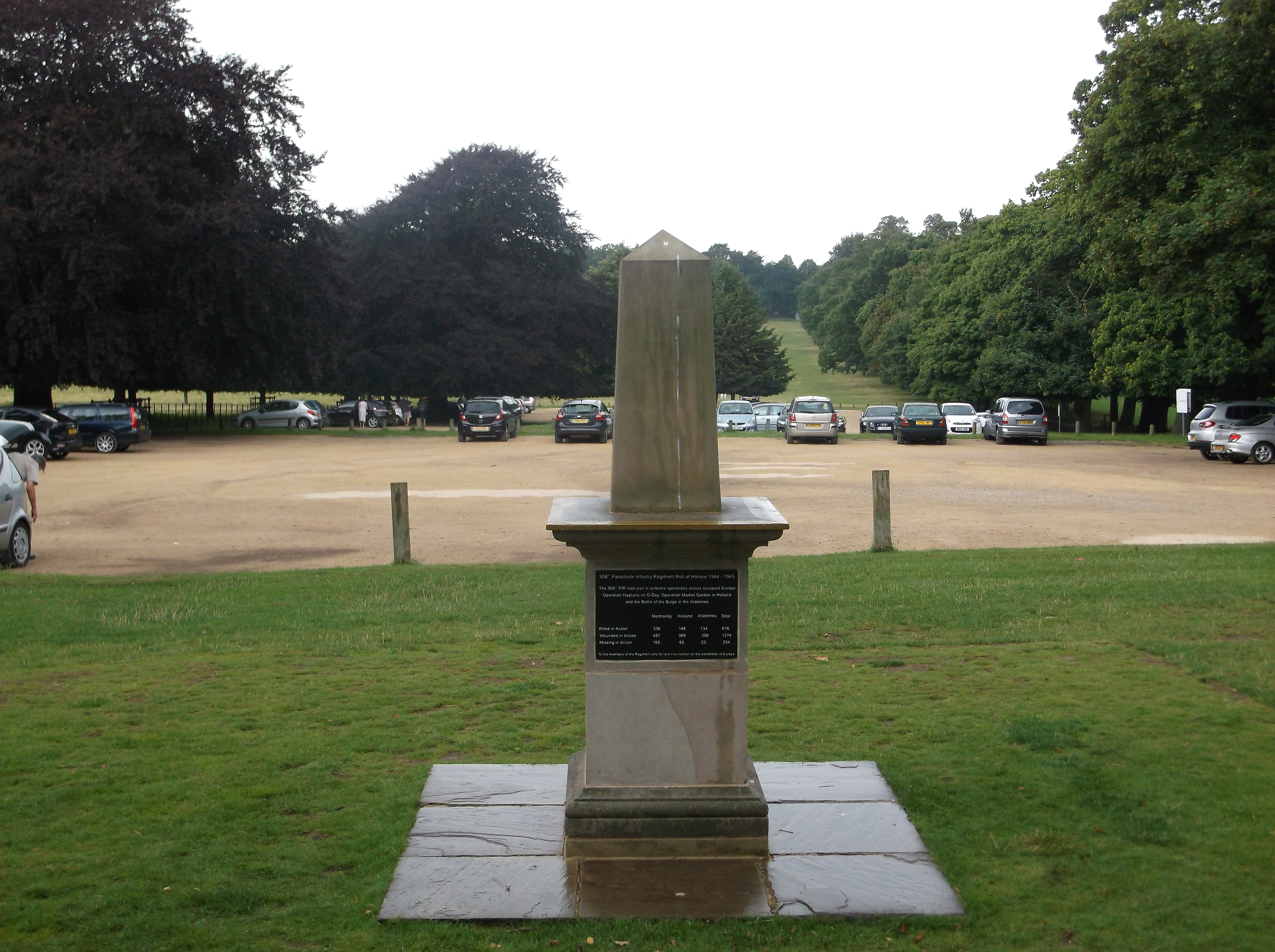
Memorial to fallen members of the 508th PIR in Wollaton Park, Nottingham, England, where the regiment was based in 1944–1945.

The 508th later played a major part in the Battle of the Bulge in late December 1944, during which they screened the withdrawal of some 20,000 troops from St. Vith and defended their positions against the German Panzer divisions. They also participated in the assault led by the 2nd Ranger Battalion to capture Hill 400. The regiment saw little further service in the war and in April 1945 were detached from command of the 82nd Airborne Division, coming under direct control of the First Allied Airborne Army. Lindquist, now a full colonel, relinquished command of the regiment to Lieutenant Colonel Otho Holmes in December 1945. The 508th Parachute Infantry Regiment returned to the United States soon after, settling at Camp Milner, New Jersey and was inactivated on 25 November 1946.

==== Individual awards ====
The following awards were received by individuals.

- Medal of Honor:1 (First Sergeant Leonard A. Funk, Jr.)
- Distinguished Service Cross:14
- Silver Star:111
- Bronze Star:341
- Legion of Merit:3
- Soldier's Medal:7

=== Cold War ===
The 508th was reactivated as the separate 508th Airborne Regimental Combat Team 1951 at Fort Bragg, North Carolina, with Colonel Joe S. Lawrie assigned as commander. The regiment served in Japan, and later moved to Fort Campbell where it once again inactivated in March 1957 as part of the reactivation of the 101st Airborne Division as a combat unit.

When the Army abandoned the Pentomic battle group structure in the early 1960s, the 508th reorganized under the Combat Arms Regimental System as a parent regiment and at the same time was renamed the 508th Infantry. Within the 82nd Airborne Division, the former Company A, 508th PIR was reorganized and re-designated as HHC, 1st Battalion (Airborne), 508th Infantry, an element of the 3d Brigade. The former Company B, 508th PIR was reactivated as HHC, 2d Battalion (Airborne), 508th Infantry, part of the 1st Brigade. The 1st and 2d Battalions, 508th Infantry continued to serve in the 82nd Airborne Division. They served in Operation Powerpack in the Dominican Republic in 1965 and 1966.

When the 3d Brigade was sent to Vietnam in response to the Tet Offensive in early 1968, 1-508th accompanied it. There it took part of the heavy fighting of Huế and the Tet counteroffensives. It was later awarded the Presidential Unit Citation. From 8 August 1962 to 26 June 1968, the lineage of Co C, 508 PIR was reactivated as HHC, 3-508th INF, and the unit served as an airborne battalion within the 193d Infantry Brigade in Panama. When the Airborne component of the battalion was reduced to a single company (Co A), the battalion was reflagged as the 3d Battalion, 5th Infantry.

In 1983 both battalions served in the Operation Urgent Fury with the invasion of Grenada.

The colors of 1st Battalion, 508th and 2d Battalion, 508th Infantry departed the 82nd Airborne Division during an Army-wide reflagging of combat units in the 1980s, leaving the division with battalions of the 325th, 504th, and 505th within the 2d, 1st and 3d Brigades, respectively.

=== Operation Just Cause ===
The 1st Battalion, 508th Infantry was activated as part of the 193rd Infantry Brigade from 1987 to 1995 at Fort Kobbe, Panama. The 1st Battalion fought during Operation Just Cause, the invasion of Panama. It was inactivated with the parent 193rd Infantry Brigade as US forces departed Panama in 1995.

During Operation Just Cause, HHC, A Company, and B Company, were assigned to secure and hold Fort Amador. Company C was given a separate assignment, to secure and hold La Commandancia alongside elements of the 75th Ranger Regiment. During the battle for La Commandancia, Company C incurred the battalion's only Killed in Action (KIA) for the battalion: Private First Class Vance Coats and Sergeant Mike DeBlois.

=== Kosovo peacekeeping ===
The colors of 1st Battalion, 508th Infantry were reactivated in 1996 in Vicenza, Italy, by reflagging the existing 3rd Battalion, 325th Infantry, an airborne battalion combat team, and was expanded in June 2000 to become the reactivated 173rd Airborne Brigade. The battalion had elements training all over Europe and participated in the Kosovo peacekeeping mission from 1996 to 2006.

=== Invasion of Iraq ("Operation Northern Delay") ===
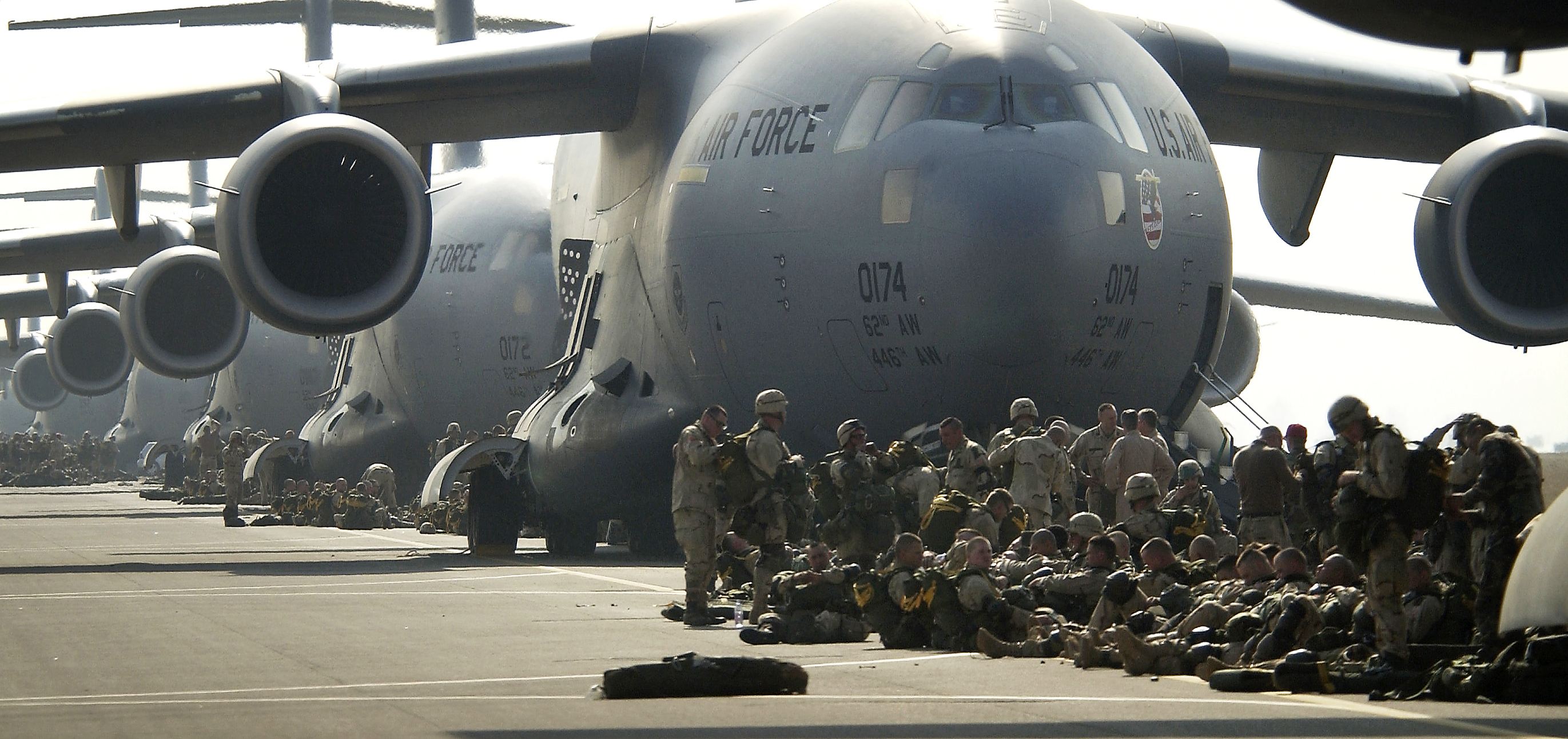
U.S. Army paratroopers prepare to board a C-17 Globemaster III into the Kurdish-controlled area of northern Iraq. This was the first combat insertion of paratroopers using a C-17.

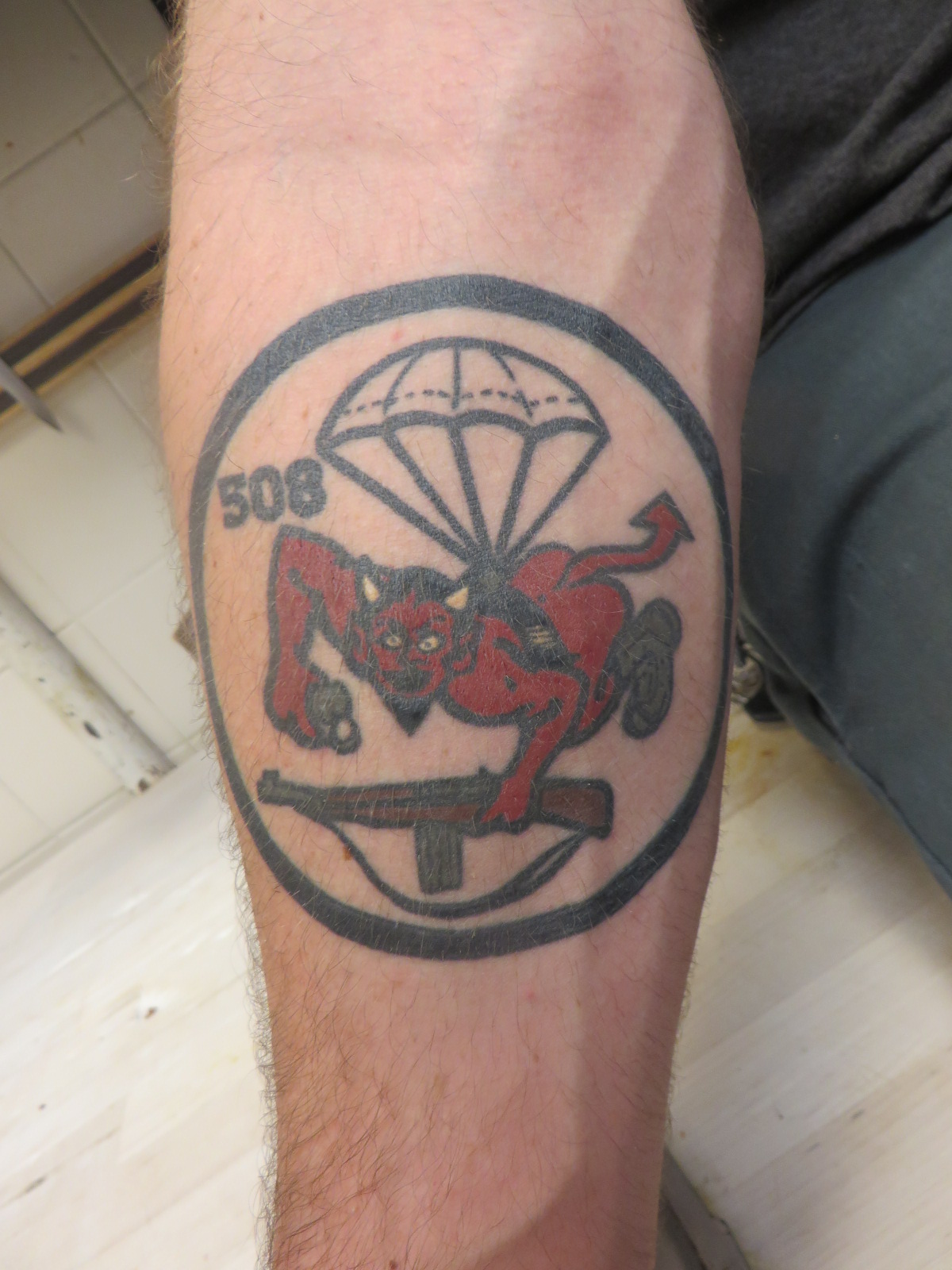
A veteran paratrooper of the 508th Infantry Regiment shows his regimental "Red Devil" tattoo.

On 26 March 2003, the 173rd Airborne Brigade conducted the 44th combat jump in US history, dropping 965 paratroopers into northern Iraq to secure a lodgement at Bashur during Operation Iraqi Freedom (OIF). The 173rd was originally to be attached to the 4th Infantry Division but when Turkey refused the US permission to move the 4th Infantry Division through its territory, U.S. European Command (USEUCOM) ordered the 173rd to plan an airborne operation into Iraq. Without the 4th Infantry Division, Special Operations Forces (SOF) troops would be fully responsible for securing northern Iraq until conventional forces could fight their way up north from Kuwait.

The 173rd Airborne Brigade became subordinate to the Joint Special Operations Task Force-North (JSOTF-North) which marked the first in the integration of special and conventional forces during OIF. As the brigade prepared to jump, a small drop zone support team of Army and Air Force personnel moved forward separately to link up with SOF soldiers already on the ground in the vicinity of Bashur along with elements of the 74th Long Range Surveillance Detachment (LRSD) and Air Force tactical air controller in Constanta, Romania.

At 8:00 PM local time on 26 March 2003, five C-17s dropped 10 heavy drop platforms of vehicles and equipment. At 8:10 PM, 964 soldiers, including the brigade commander, Colonel William Mayville exited in 58 seconds. Only 32 jumpers did not make it out of the aircraft. The bulk of the airborne force came from the 1-508th Infantry Battalion (Airborne), led by Lieutenant Colonel Harry D. Tunnell, and the 2-503 Infantry Battalion (Airborne), led by Lieutenant Colonel Dominic Caraccilo. The 1-508 main effort had the mission to secure the southeast side of the Bashur Airfield and prepare the runway to receive C-17s within 6 hours of landing. The 2-503 would secure the northeast side of the objective. The remainder of the brigade combat team (BCT) included field artillery, Battery D, 319th Airborne Field Artillery Regiment, combat engineers, Stinger air defenders, from 173rd Combat Support Company (CSC), 74th LRSD, medics from the 501st Forward Support Company (FSC), a surgical team from the 250th Medical Detachment (Forward Surgical Team), Operational Detachment Alpha (-), 2nd Battalion, 10th Special Forces Group, a public affairs officer on loan from the JSOTF-North, and U.S. Air Force airmen from the 86th Expeditionary Contingency Response Group and 4th Air Support Operations Squadron (-) (ASOS). 19 soldiers were injured during the jump, with four requiring evacuation back to Italy due to broken bones and joint dislocations.

With the ground and airfield secured, the rest of the brigade closed quickly. In the days following the jump, 12 C-17s landed per day, bringing in another 1,200 soldiers and vehicles from the brigade's assigned and attached units. Within 96-hours, 2,160 soldiers and 381 pieces of equipment was moved from Aviano Air Base, Italy to Bashur Airfield, Iraq, led by the 62nd and 446th Airlift Wings from McChord Air Force Base, Washington and 437th Airlift Wing and 315th Reserve Airlift Wing from Charleston Air Force Base, South Carolina. Task Force 1-63 Armor flew in on additional 27 C-17 sorties. Although the 173rd played a crucial strategic role by establishing a significant conventional presence in northern Iraq, it did not engage in significant combat operations prior to the end of major combat operations. The brigade first saw action when it moved on Kirkuk on 10 April 2003, following the JSOTF-North's successful efforts to evict the Iraqi Republican Guard and Regular Army from the city. Once in Kirkuk, the 173rd was vital in establishing a secure environment for follow-on stability operations.

=== Operation Enduring Freedom ===
In 2005-2006 the 1st Battalion, as part of the [173rd Airborne Brigade], deployed to Afghanistan for Operation Enduring Freedom. As part of Task Force Fury, they were deployed to the border on Pakistan in RC East where it served under the Command of Joint Task Force Devil (1st Brigade, 82nd Airborne Division) at Orgun-E. Units were located across RC East in company FOBs at Waza Kwha, C Company (Rock); Bermel, A Company (Sharks); Sharana, HHC (Workhorse), and B Company (Legion). In June 2005 Legion was redeployed to RC South (Kandahar) under Task Force Gun Devil (3d Battalion, 319th Field Artillery). The battalion returned from Afghanistan in February 2006. The colors of 1-508th left the 173rd when the battalion was reflagged as 1-503d Infantry in June 2006.

In January 2006, the colors of both the 1st Battalion and 2nd Battalion, 508th Infantry Regiment, were reactivated as infantry battalions in the newly activated 4th Brigade Combat Team, 82nd Airborne Division. In January 2007, 1-508th, 2-508th, 4-73rd Cavalry (the 4th Brigade's Reconnaissance Squadron), 2-321 Field Artillery, and the 782nd Brigade Support Battalion deployed to Afghanistan in support of Operation Enduring Freedom. In August 2009, the brigade returned to Afghanistan to support Operation Enduring Freedom, and 2-508 was sent to replace 1-17th Infantry Regiment after 1-17th encountered heavy losses due to large IED strikes and small arms encounters. / 5th SBCT/ 2ID in the Arghandab River Valley. After a year long deployment, each company from 2-508 was then replaced by battalions from the 101st Airborne division as well as elements from 4th Infantry Division's 1-12 Infantry Regiment. The Brigade returned to RC South (Zharay and Maywand) in 2012.

As part of Army-wide reductions and reorganizations, the 4th BCT was inactivated on 16 May 2014. The brigade's two infantry battalions, 1-508 PIR and 2-508 PIR were reassigned to the 82nd's 3rd BCT and 2nd BCT, respectively.

== Lineage and honors ==
=== Lineage ===
- Constituted 6 October 1942 in the Army of the United States as the 508th Parachute Infantry
- Activated 20 October 1942 at Camp Blanding, Florida
- Inactivated 25 November 1946 at Camp Killmer, New Jersey
- Redesignated 16 April 1951 as the 508th Airborne Infantry; concurrently allotted to the Regular Army and activated at Fort Bragg, North Carolina
- Inactivated 22 March 1957 at Fort Campbell, Kentucky
- Redesignated 15 July 1962 as 508th Infantry, a parent regiment under the Combat Arms Regimental System
- Withdrawn 10 July 1987 from the Combat Arms Regimental System and reorganized under the United States Army Regimental System
- Redesignated 1 October 2005 as the 508th Infantry Regiment

=== Campaign participation credit ===
- World War II: Normandy (with arrowhead); Rhineland (with arrowhead); Ardennes-Alsace; Central Europe
- Vietnam: Tet Counteroffensive; Counteroffensive, Phase IV; Counteroffensive, Phase V; Counteroffensive, Phase VI; Tet 69/Counteroffensive; Summer-Fall 1969; Winter-Spring 1970
- Armed Forces Expeditions: Dominican Republic; Grenada; Panama
- War on Terrorism:
  - Afghanistan: Consolidation II; Consolidation III
  - Iraq: Liberation of Iraq (with arrowhead); Transition of Iraq
  - Iraq: Operation Inherent Resolve (2nd 508th, 2nd BCT); December 2016 – September 2017
  - Afghanistan: Operation Freedom Sentinel (1st 508th, 3rd BCT); June 2019 - March 2020
  - Iraq: Operation Inherent Resolve (2-508th PIR, 2nd BCT); July 2020- February 2021

=== Decorations ===
- Presidential Unit Citation (Army), 1st Battalion, 508th Infantry Regiment, Afghanistan, 7 December 2007 to 12 December 2007
- Presidential Unit Citation (Army), Streamer embroidered COTENTIN PENINSULA
- Valorous Unit Award, Streamer embroidered HUE AND SAIGON
- Valorous Unit Award, Streamer embroidered GHAZNI AND WARDAK PROVINCES 2007-2008
- Valorous Unit Award, Streamer embroidered ZABUL AND KANDAHAR PROVINCES 2009-2010
- Valorous Unit Award, Streamer embroidered KANDAHAR PROVINCE 2012
- Meritorious Unit Commendation (Army), Streamer embroidered IRAQ 2003
- Meritorious Unit Commendation (Army), Streamer embroidered AFGHANISTAN 2013-2014
- Army Superior Unit Award, Streamer embroidered 1990
- French Croix de Guerre with Palm, World War II, Streamer embroidered STE. MERE EGLISE
- French Croix de Guerre with Palm, World War II, Streamer embroidered COTENTIN
- French Croix de Guerre, World War II, Fourragere
- Military Order of William (Degree of the Knight of the Fourth Class), Streamer embroidered NIJMEGEN 1944
- Netherlands Orange Lanyard
- Belgian Fourragere 1940
  - Cited in the Order of the Day of the Belgian Army for action in the Ardennes
  - Cited in the Order of the Day of the Belgian Army for action in Belgium and Germany
  - Cited in the Order of the Day of the Belgian Army for action at St. Vith
