= Roy E. Lindquist =

American World War II Major General

Roy Ernest Lindquist
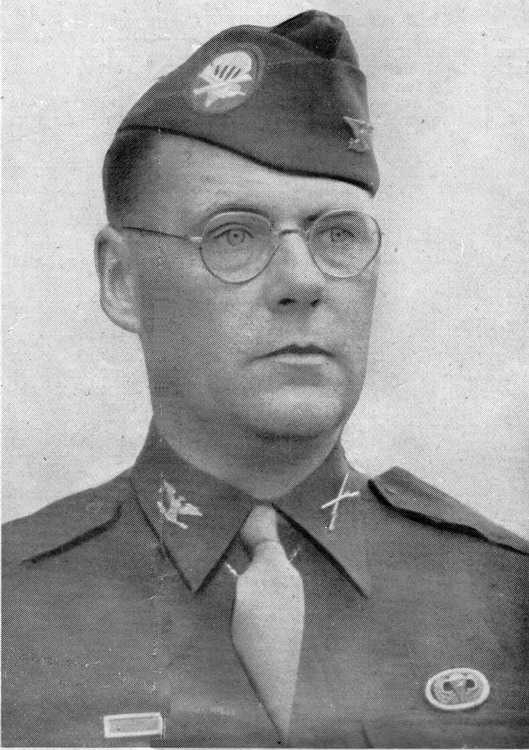
- Born: February 18, 1907; West Newton, Massachusetts, United States
- Died: November 19, 1986 (aged 79); St. Petersburg, Florida, United States
- Military career
- Allegiance: United States
- Branch: United States Army
- Service years: 1924–1960
- Rank: Major General
- Service number: 0-18125
- Unit: Infantry Branch
- Commands: 508th Parachute Infantry Regiment; 187th Airborne Regimental Combat Team; 3rd Infantry Division
- Conflicts: World War II; Cold War
- Awards: Distinguished Service Medal; Silver Star; Legion of Merit (2)

Major General Roy Ernest Lindquist (February 18, 1907 – November 19, 1986) was a highly decorated senior United States Army officer. He saw service during World War II and is most noted for his leadership of the 508th Parachute Infantry Regiment (PIR) during the campaign in Western Europe from June 1944 to May 1945.

== Early years ==
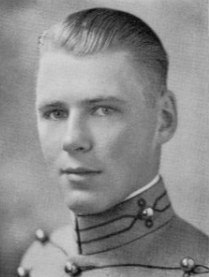
As a West Point cadet

Roy was born on February 18, 1907, in West Newton, Massachusetts, as the first of the three sons to Ernst and Anna Lindquist. He attended Maine Central Institute in Pittsfield, Maine. He also enlisted in the Maine Army National Guard in January 1924 in order to support his effort to be appointed to the United States Military Academy.

Young Lindquist was finally appointed to the United States Military Academy at West Point, New York as a Cadet on July 1, 1926. He graduated on June 11, 1930, and was also commissioned as a Second lieutenant in the infantry on that date. Subsequently, he was assigned to Fort Williams, Maine. He also married his fiancée Alice in December of the same year.

He spent the next decade on various infantry assignments in the United States, and also attended the Company Officers' Course at Infantry School at Fort Benning, Georgia in 1934. He was promoted to the rank of First lieutenant on August 1, 1935. By October 1939, Lindquist served with the 29th Infantry Regiment at Fort Benning, Georgia.

== World War II ==
In 1940, Roy joined the newly created 501st Parachute Battalion at Fort Benning and after two years of intensive training, he was appointed a commanding officer of the 508th Parachute Infantry Regiment. He was promoted to the rank of lieutenant colonel on October 20, 1942.

Lindquist commanded the 508th Parachute Infantry Regiment throughout the whole war, during extensive training and maneuvers before the deployment overseas. The 508th Parachute Infantry arrived in Northern Ireland in January 1944 and moved to England in March of the same year, and later participated in the Normandy Campaign, Operation Market Garden and Battle of the Bulge.

He was succeeded in command of the regiment by Lieutenant Colonel Otho E. Holmes in December 1945. For his leadership of the regiment during the War, he was awarded with Silver Star (Operation Overlord), Legion of Merit, three Bronze Star Medals, Purple Heart and Combat Infantryman Badge by the Government of the United States. He was decorated with the Bronze Lion by the Government of the Netherlands for his service during Operation Market Garden. France decorated him with the Croix de guerre 1939-1945 for his part in the Normandy Campaign.

== Postwar service ==
After World War II, Lindquist graduated from the Command and General Staff School in 1946. He was then assigned to the Infantry School at Fort Benning, Georgia. He was appointed an assistant commander of the Airborne Department of the school under the command of Brigadier General William M. Miley. He served in this capacity until 1948, when he was transferred to Greece to become a member of the Joint Military Assistance Group during the Greek Civil War. He stayed there until 1950. For his service, Lindquist was awarded with the Order of the Phoenix in the grade of Officer by the Government of Greece.

After his return to the States, Lindquist attended the National War College in Washington, D.C. After graduation in 1951, he was appointed to the office of Assistant Chief of Staff within Army Ground Forces. He was promoted to the rank of brigadier general in 1953 and appointed a commander of the 187th Airborne Regimental Combat Team, which was stationed in Korea and consisted of several Airborne units in the size of a brigade.

Lindquist stayed in Korea and was appointed the Chief of Staff and Deputy Commander of the IX Corps under the command of Lieutenant General James Edward Moore.

Now a major general, Lindquist was transferred back to the States and posted to Fort Campbell, Kentucky, before he was appointed a commander of the 3rd Infantry Division in March 1957.

After his death, Lindquist was buried at the West Point Cemetery on November 24, 1986.

== Decorations ==
Here is the ribbon bar of Major General Roy E. Lindquist:

Parachutist Badge with two combat jumps
Combat Infantryman Badge
1st Row	Army Distinguished Service Medal		Silver Star	
2nd Row	Legion of Merit with Oak Leaf Cluster	Bronze Star Medal with two Oak Leaf Clusters	Purple Heart	American Defense Service Medal with Foreign Service Clasp
3rd Row	European-African-Middle Eastern Campaign Medal with four 3/16 inch service stars and Arrowhead device	American Campaign Medal	World War II Victory Medal	Army of Occupation Medal
4th Row	National Defense Service Medal	Dutch Bronze Lion	French Croix de guerre 1939-1945	Officer of the Order of the Phoenix (Greece)
Presidential Unit Citation

Military offices
Preceded by Frederick R. Zierath	Commanding General 3rd Infantry Division; 1957–1958	Succeeded by John S. Upham
