= Lechthaler =

Lechthaler is a surname. Notable people with the surname include:

- Luca Lechthaler (born 1986), Italian basketball player
- Roy Lechthaler (1908–1980), American football player
