= Bob Books (American football) =

American football player (1903–1958)

No. 9
- Position: Fullback

Personal information
- Born: March 1, 1903
- Died: April 4, 1958 (aged 55)
- Listed height: 5 ft 11 in (1.80 m)
- Listed weight: 190 lb (86 kg)

Career information
- High school: Mercersburg Academy (Mercersburg, Pennsylvania)
- College: Dickinson

Career history
- Frankford Yellow Jackets (1926)

Awards and highlights
- NFL champion (1926)
- Stats at Pro Football Reference

Robert Garfield Books (March 1, 1903 – April 4, 1958) was an American football fullback who played one season with the Frankford Yellow Jackets of the National Football League (NFL). He played college football at Dickinson College.

== Early life ==
Books was from Harrisburg, Pennsylvania and first enrolled at Harrisburg Technical High School before transferring to Mercersburg Academy. He was part of the 1919 Harrisburg Tech High School Football National Championship team.

== College career ==
Books played for the Dickinson Red Devils, where he was named team captain in 1925.

== Professional career ==
Books played in four games for the Frankford Yellow Jackets of the NFL in 1926.
