= Edward E. Ford Foundation =

- Founded: December 12, 1957; 68 years ago
- Founders: Edward E. Ford
- Type: Private
- Purpose: To improve secondary education by supporting U.S. independent schools and encouraging promising practices.
- Location: Brooklyn, New York, US
- Region served: United States and its territories
- Method: Grants, funding
- Executive Director: John Gulla
- Board of Trustees, Chair: Robert W. Hallett
- Website: eeford.org

Edward E. Ford was no relation to Henry Ford. For the foundation established by Henry Ford, see Ford Foundation.

The Edward E. Ford Foundation (E. E. Ford Foundation) is a private organization that provides funding to independent schools, school accreditors, and education initiatives.

== Origins ==
Edward E. Ford, a successful businessman involved in the early years of IBM, established the Foundation on December 12, 1957. Its main objective was to improve the quality of high school education with particular emphasis on private schools. When he died in 1963, Ford bequeathed about $50 million to the Foundation.

== Supporting Independent Schools ==
The Foundation initially directed much of its efforts toward supporting Ford's high school alma mater, Mercersburg Academy. This included a $1.5 million matching grant in 1964, the highest such matching gift to any American private school at that time. As of 2023 the Foundation had contributed over $125 million in total grants to nearly 1,000 independent schools and associations.

The Foundation’s mission "is to strengthen and support independent secondary schools and to challenge and inspire them to leverage their unique talents, expertise, and resources to advance teaching while encouraging collaboration with other institutions."

The Foundation’s Leadership Grant Program is among the most prestigious awards available to independent schools.

== Edward E. Ford ==
Edward E. Ford
- Born: 1894; Binghamton, New York
- Died: 1963 (aged 68–69); Delray Beach, Florida
- Education: Princeton University
- Known for: Business and philanthropy

Edward E. Ford (1894–1963) was a businessman and philanthropist from Binghamton, New York.

The son of IBM co-founder A. Ward Ford, Ford attended Mercersburg Academy (class of 1912), Princeton University, and Lafayette College.

After college Ford established and developed a manufacturing business in Binghamton, New York, which ultimately became part of IBM. Joining IBM in 1917 as a junior salesman, Ford ascended to the role of division vice-president by 1936. Ford later ventured into independent business in St. Louis, Missouri and later in Florida. His businesses in St. Louis included a Chevrolet dealership.

In 1949, Ford was elected an IBM director, and by 1962, Ford's holdings in IBM stock amounted to about $61 million.

=== Ford's Philanthropy ===
In the late 1950s, Ford donated $350,000 to Mercersburg Academy for its building and development programs.

In 1957, he established the Edward E. Ford Foundation with the primary goal of improving the quality of high school education with particular emphasis on private schools.

=== Ford's personal life ===
Ford's first wife Jane Bloomer died in Delray Beach, Florida in 1960. He later married Mrs. Edward (Jane) Jamison of New York City. On March 5, 1963, Ford died in his sleep at his home in Delray Beach, Florida.
