= Lane House (Mercersburg, Pennsylvania) =

Historic house in Pennsylvania, United States

- U.S. National Register of Historic Places
- U.S. Historic district – Contributing property
- Pennsylvania state historical marker
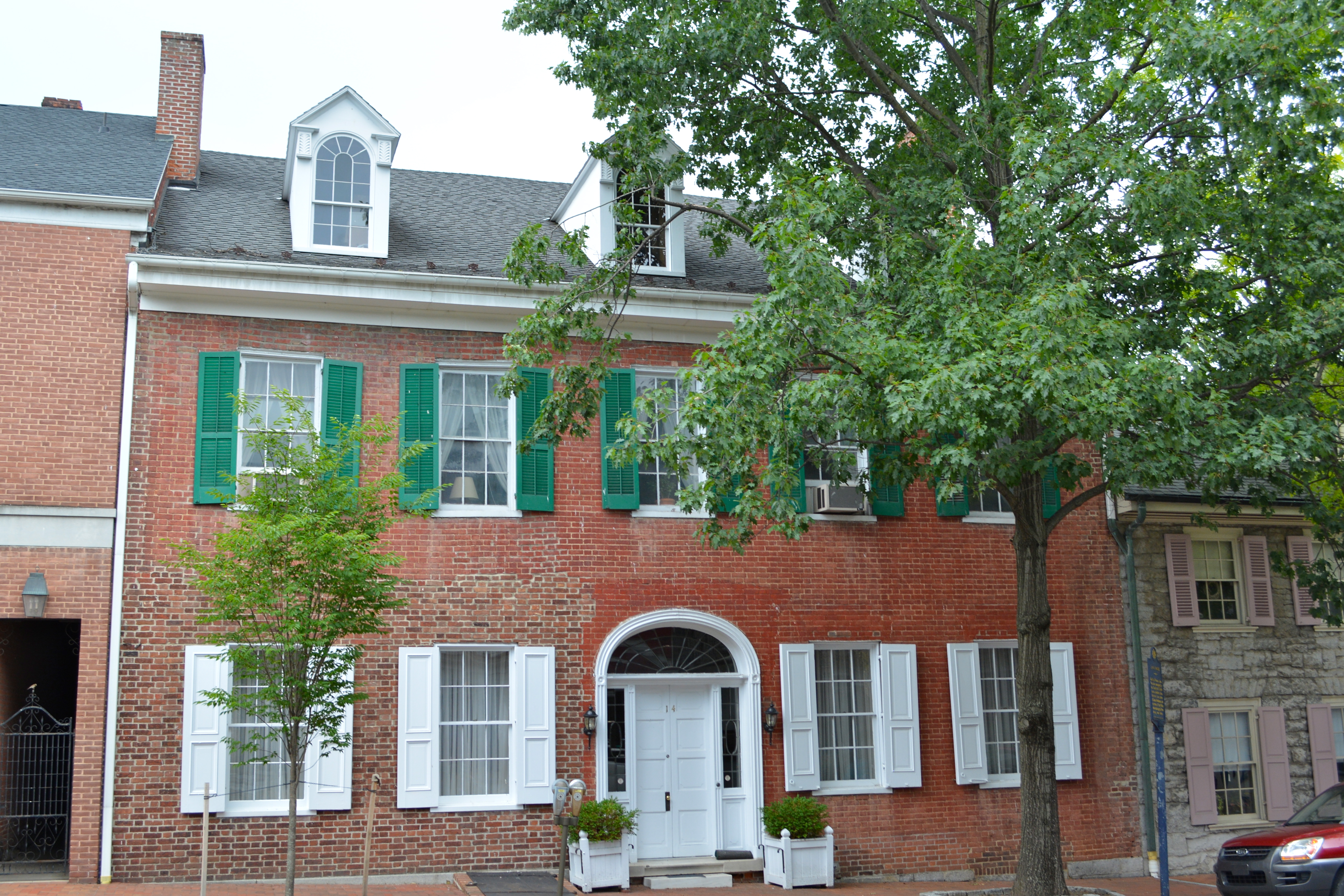

- Location within Pennsylvania Location within the United States
- Location: 14 N. Main St., Mercersburg, Pennsylvania
- Coordinates: 39°49′44″N 77°54′17″W
- Area: 1 acre (0.40 ha)
- Built: 1828
- Architectural style: Federal
- NRHP reference No.: 72001123

Significant dates
- Added to NRHP: January 13, 1972
- Designated PHMC: July 2, 1953

The Lane House is an historic home that is located in Mercersburg in Franklin County, Pennsylvania, United States.

It was listed on the National Register of Historic Places in 1972 and is located in the Mercersburg Historic District.

== History and architectural features ==
Built in 1828, this historic structure is a 2 1/2-story, five-bay, brick dwelling that was designed in the Federal style. It was the birthplace of Harriet Lane (1830-1903), who served as hostess at the White House for her uncle James Buchanan from 1857 to 1861.
