= The James Buchanan Hotel =

Historic American hotel and former boyhood home of President Buchanan

Coordinates: 39.8288°N 77.9036°W

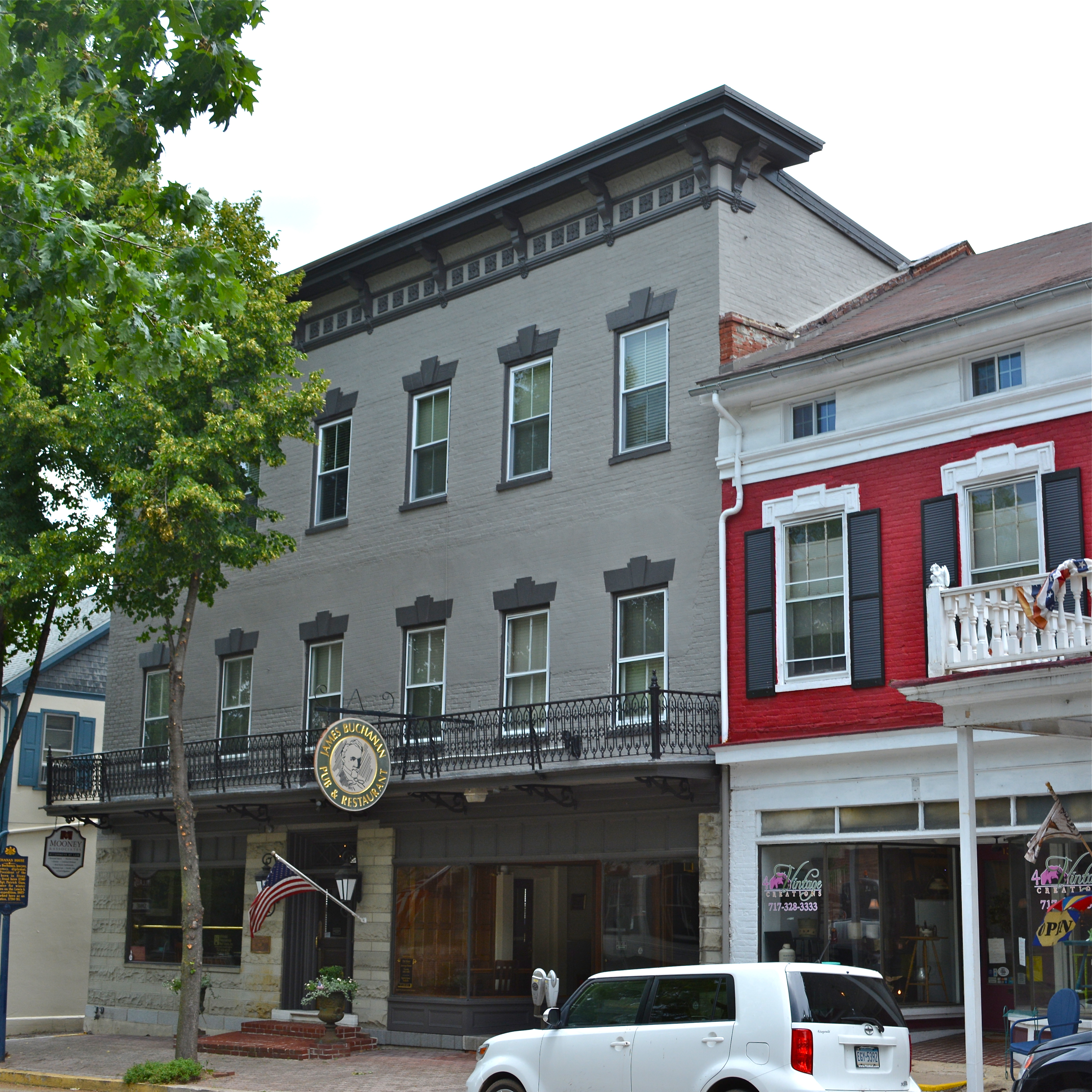
The James Buchanan Hotel in Mercersburg, Pennsylvania

The James Buchanan Hotel is an historic hotel that is located on North Main Street in downtown Mercersburg, Pennsylvania, United States. It was the boyhood home of the fifteenth President of the United States, James Buchanan and was built by James Buchanan Sr. in 1796.

== History and architectural features ==
Buchanan built this structure as a two-story brick residence; the third story was added during the late 19th century. It is part of the Mercersburg Historic District, which was listed by the National Register of Historic Places in 1978.

In 2022, the James Buchanan Hotel was bought by Capital Hotels Mercersburg, LLC and is currently owned and operated by Maxwell S Paul and family.
