= Mercersburg Academy =

Prep school in Mercersburg, Pennsylvania, US

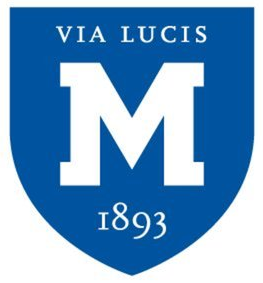

Location
- 100 Academy Drive; Mercersburg, Pennsylvania 17236; United States; 39°49′34″N 77°53′54″W

Information
- Former name: Marshall College (1836–65); Mercersburg College (1865–93)
- Type: Independent selective college-preparatory boarding and day high school
- Motto: Latin: Integritas, Virilitas, Fidelitas (Integrity, Virility, Fidelity)
- Religious affiliation: Nonsectarian
- Established: 1836 (190 years ago)
- Founder: William Mann Irvine
- Status: Operational
- CEEB code: 392570
- NCES School ID: 01197796
- Head of school: Quentin McDowell
- Staff: 153
- Faculty: 106
- Teaching staff: 55
- Grades: 9–12
- Gender: Coeducational
- Enrollment: 452 (2024–2025)
  - Grade 9: 88
  - Grade 10: 110
  - Grade 11: 119
  - Grade 12: 135
- Average class size: 12
- Student to teacher ratio: 7.6
- Classes offered: 150
- Language: English
- Hours in school day: 6
- Campus size: 300 acres (120 ha)
- Campus type: Rural
- Colors: Blue and white
- Athletics conference: Mid-Atlantic Prep League (MAPL)
- Sports: 27 varsity teams
- Nickname: The Storm
- Accreditations: Middle States Association of Colleges and Schools (MSA), National Association of Independent Schools (NAIS), TABS, PAIS
- Newspaper: The Mercersburg News
- Yearbook: Karux
- Endowment: $422 million
- Budget: $39.5 million
- School fees: $310–$1,360
- Annual tuition: $78,900 (boarding) $50,800 (day)
- Alumni: 12,211
- Nobel laureates: Burton Richter
- Website: mercersburg.edu
- Mercersburg Academy
- U.S. National Register of Historic Places
- U.S. Historic district
- Location within Pennsylvania Location within the United States
- Location: PA 16, Mercersburg, Pennsylvania
- Area: 15 acres (6.1 ha)
- Built: 1836
- Architect: Multiple
- Architectural style: Classical Revival, Late Gothic Revival
- NRHP reference No.: 84003374
- Added to NRHP: June 21, 1984 (42 years ago)

Mercersburg Academy (formerly Marshall College and Mercersburg College) is an independent college-preparatory boarding and day high school in Mercersburg, Pennsylvania, in the United States.

Founded in 1893, the school enrolls approximately 447 students in grades 9 through 12, including postgraduates, on a campus about ninety miles northwest by north of Washington, D.C.

== History ==
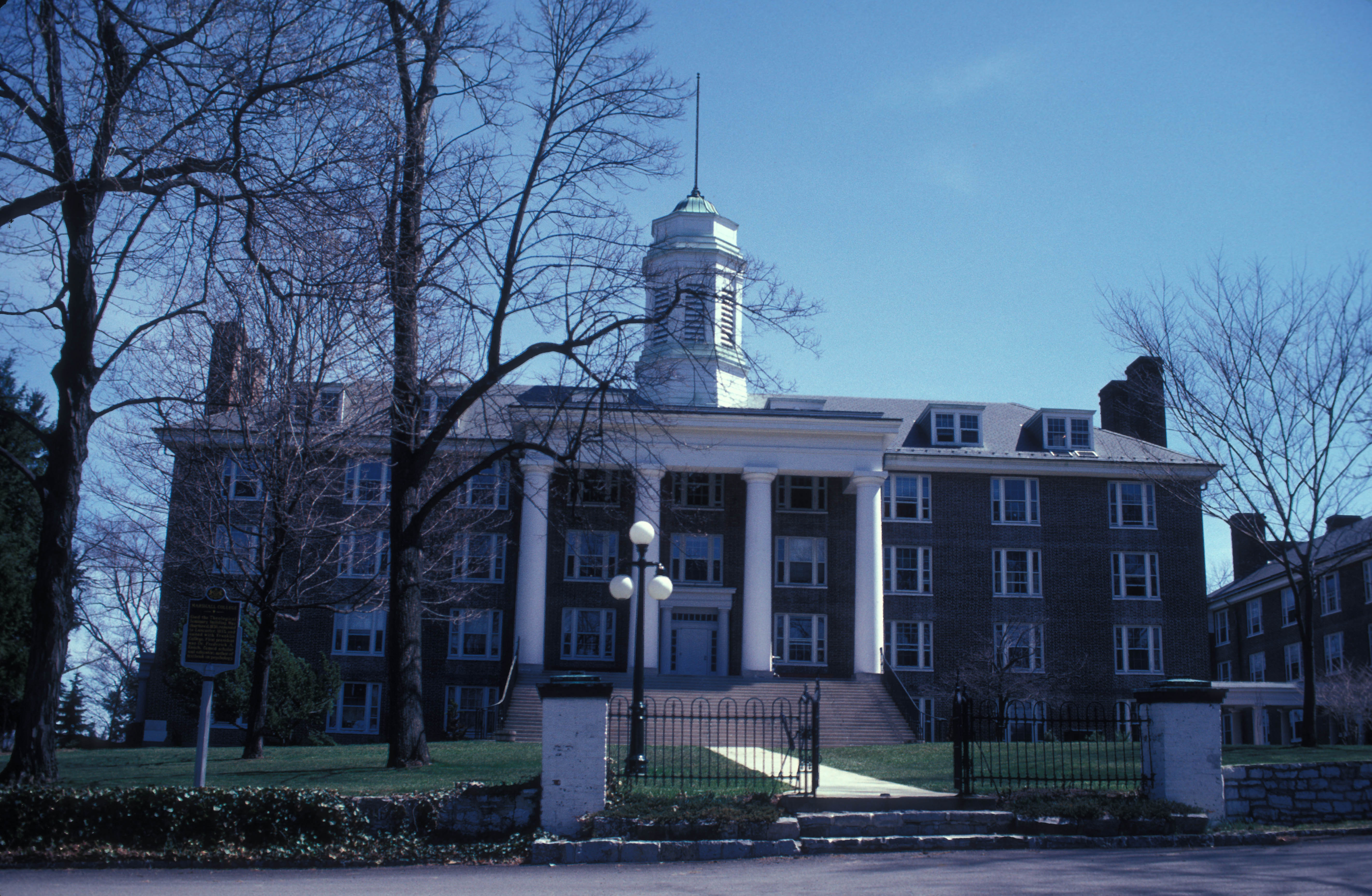
Main Hall

On March 31, 1836, the Pennsylvania General Assembly granted a charter to Marshall College to be located in Mercersburg. Dr. Frederick Augustus Rauch came from Switzerland to be the first president of the college under the sponsorship of the Reformed Church in the United States. Rauch served as president from 1836 until 1841. His successor in the position was John Williamson Nevin, who served until 1853 when Marshall College joined with Franklin College in Lancaster, Pennsylvania, to become Franklin & Marshall College.

At this time, the preparatory department of Marshall College became known as Marshall Academy, which later became Marshall Collegiate Institute. In 1865, the name was again changed to Mercersburg College, under whose charter the school continues to operate. The historical tie to the church continues through Mercersburg's membership in the Council for Higher Education of the United Church of Christ.

Artist Richard Rummell produced an early 20th-century aerial view of the college.

In 1893, Dr. William Mann Irvine was selected by the Board of Regents to lead the school, newly christened The Mercersburg Academy. Irvine oversaw considerable growth in enrollment, faculty, and facilities until he died in 1928. He was succeeded by Boyd Edwards (1928–1941), Charles Tippetts '12 (1941–1961), Bill Fowle (1961–1972), and Walter Burgin '53 (1972–1997).

Douglas Hale was appointed head of school in 1997, coming from Baylor School in Chattanooga, Tennessee, where he had been a teacher, assistant headmaster, and, since 1973, headmaster. During Hale's tenure, Mercersburg's endowment grew from $64 million in 1997 to $251 million in June 2015.

Hale was succeeded in 2016 by Katherine Titus, who was the first female head of school in the academy's history. Titus was succeeded by Quentin McDowell in 2021.

The school is a member of the Mid-Atlantic Boarding School Group (MABS).

== Admission ==
As of the 2024–2025 school year, 452 students were enrolled: 50% boys and 50% girls. Eighty-one percent of the students were boarding students, while nineteen percent were day students.

Students come from around the world, representing 31 nations, 28 American states, and the District of Columbia. International students accounted for 20% of the student body, and 44% of domestic students were people of color. Seventy-eight percent of the Mercersburg Class of 2017 was accepted by one or more colleges defined as 'Most Competitive' or 'Highly Competitive' by Barron's Profiles of American Colleges, with sixty-eight percent accepted by one of U.S. News & World Report's Top 50 National Universities or Top 50 Liberal Arts Colleges.

Tuition for the 2025–2026 school year was $78,900 for boarding students and $50,800 for day students. Fifty percent of Academy students receive financial aid (need- and merit-based). The school's total financial-aid budget is more than $11 million. Mercersburg merit scholarships include the Arce Scholarships, the Guttman Scholarship, the Hale Scholarship, the Legacy Scholarships, the Mercersburg Scholarships, the Regents Scholarships, the Witmer Scholarship, and the 1893 Scholarship.

=== Endowment ===
As of February 2026, the academy has an endowment of $453 million, making it one of the top-ten-highest endowment-per-student independent schools in the country. On October 10, 2013, Mercersburg alumna Deborah Simon (class of 1974) pledged $100 million to the school, making her gift the largest in the school's history and one of the largest ever to an independent secondary school in the United States.

== Curriculum and activities ==
Mercersburg offers 150 traditional courses, including more than 40 honors and Advanced Studies courses.

=== Athletics ===
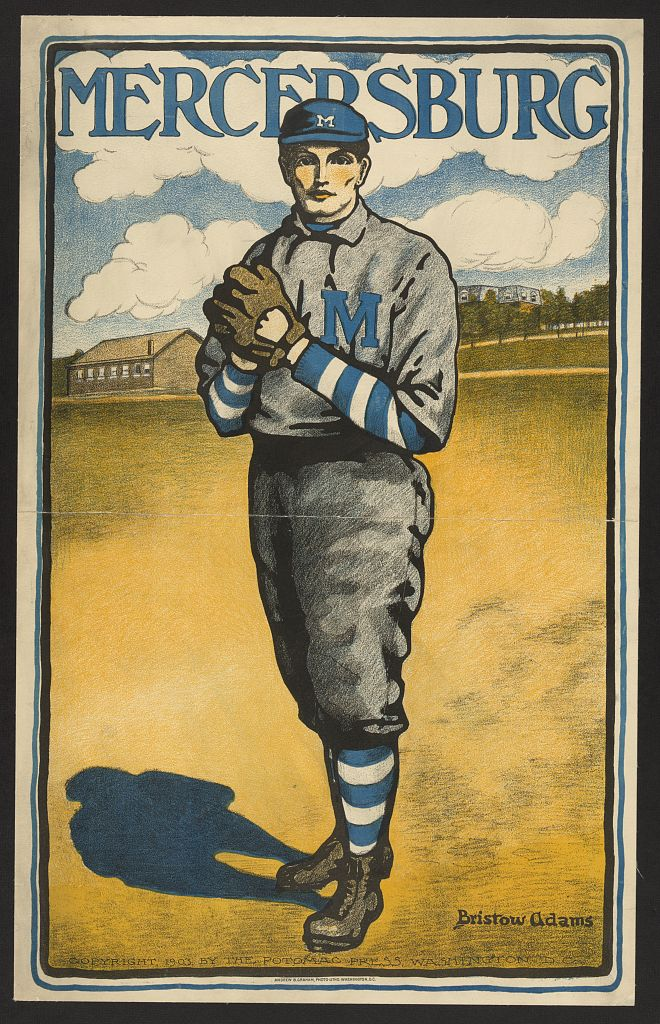
Mercersburg baseball player, poster by Bristow Adams, 1903

Since 2000, Mercersburg has been a member of the Mid-Atlantic Prep League (MAPL), which includes Blair Academy, The Hill School, Hun School of Princeton, Lawrenceville School, Peddie School, and The Pennington School.

Alumni have competed for professional teams, including the Detroit Tigers and Baltimore Orioles (MLB), Cincinnati Bengals and Pittsburgh Steelers (NFL), and Harlem Globetrotters.

=== Stony Batter Players (theatre) ===
Mercersburg embraced the performing arts as early as 1899 with the formation of Stony Batter, the school's first drama group. Stony Batter was founded by Camille Irvine, the wife of the school's founding headmaster, William Mann Irvine. The name "Stony Batter" was adopted in honor of the place near campus where U.S. president James Buchanan was born.

Today, the group is known as Stony Batter Players. Recent productions have included Fiddler on the Roof, Mamma Mia!, Proof, The Real Inspector Hound, Chicago, The Diary of Anne Frank, Antigone: An Apocalypse, Legally Blonde: The Musical, Urinetown, Mere Mortals, The Caucasian Chalk Circle, World War Z, Lend Me a Tenor, and Six, among others. In the spring, Stony Batter typically performs scenes from the classical or Shakespearean repertoire or from a modern "10-Minute Play Festival". Future Academy Award–winning actor Jimmy Stewart (class of 1928) performed in Stony Batter productions while a student at Mercersburg. Academy Award–winner Benicio Del Toro (class of 1985) is also a Mercersburg alumni.

=== Music ===
Music played an integral role at Mercersburg practically from the beginning. Dr. Irvine led the Mercersburg Academy Glee Club for several years, and in 1901, he published The Mercersburg Academy Song Book.

=== School traditions ===
The Washington Irving Literary Society and John Marshall Literary Society—the school's oldest student organizations—trace their roots back before Mercersburg Academy was established. Before Marshall College moved to Lancaster to become Franklin & Marshall College, its students created the Diagnothian and Goethean literary societies. In 1865, after the founding of Mercersburg College, the Washington Irving Literary Society was born; within a year, the rival John Marshall Literary Society emerged. William Mann Irvine helped revive the two societies at the academy's founding, and the rival societies have competed against one another ever since. All students attending Mercersburg are members of one of the two societies; those with family members who attended the school before them may choose to represent the same society. Otherwise, society officers meet early in the school year to select new students for each group. (This replaces the early practice of returning students racing to meet stagecoaches carrying new students to campus in hopes of convincing those students to join a particular society.)

What began as a midwinter debate competition has evolved into a week of intense competition in everything from basketball and swimming to chess and poker. The climactic event of the week is Declamation, a speaking contest where five representatives from each society deliver prepared monologues. Winners of each event during the week earn points for their respective societies, with the most points awarded at Declamation. The winning society claims bragging rights for the next twelve months.

Each year, on the Friday evening of Alumni Weekend (often held in October), students gather on the steps of Main Hall for Step Songs, which involves the singing of school songs and traditional cheers as a pep rally for the next day's athletic contests, usually against a Mid-Atlantic Prep League opponent. The tradition evolved from an annual concert for visiting alums, given by the Glee Club under the direction of Headmaster Irvine, into its present form. (Irvine suffered a stroke during Step Songs in 1928 and died a week later.)

== Campus ==
Mercersburg's rural 300-acre campus includes seven student dormitories, a chapel, a library, an arts center, two additional academic buildings, a student center, a dining hall, an alums and parent center, a college counseling center, 10 playing fields (including a synthetic turf field), a gymnasium and field house, an aquatic center, a squash center, and a tennis center.

The James Buchanan Cabin (believed to be the birthplace of the first Pennsylvanian to be elected president of the United States) was originally located at Stony Batter, an early trading post about 2.5 miles west of campus, and was erected sometime before 1791. It was moved to Chambersburg, Pennsylvania, where it served various uses. To ensure that the cabin would be adequately stored and maintained, the school purchased it in 1953 and placed it near Nolde Gymnasium on campus.

=== Burgin Center for the Arts ===
Standing on the former site of Boone Hall, the Burgin Center for the Arts opened in the fall of 2006, providing dedicated space to house the school's entire theatre, music, dance, and visual-arts curriculum. The 65,500-square-foot facility is named for alumnus and former headmaster Walter Burgin '53 and his wife, Barbara. Designed by Polshek Partnership, the Burgin Center hosts concerts, theatre productions, guest speakers, and all-school meetings. Violinist Itzhak Perlman performed at the building's opening gala.

=== The Carillon and organ ===
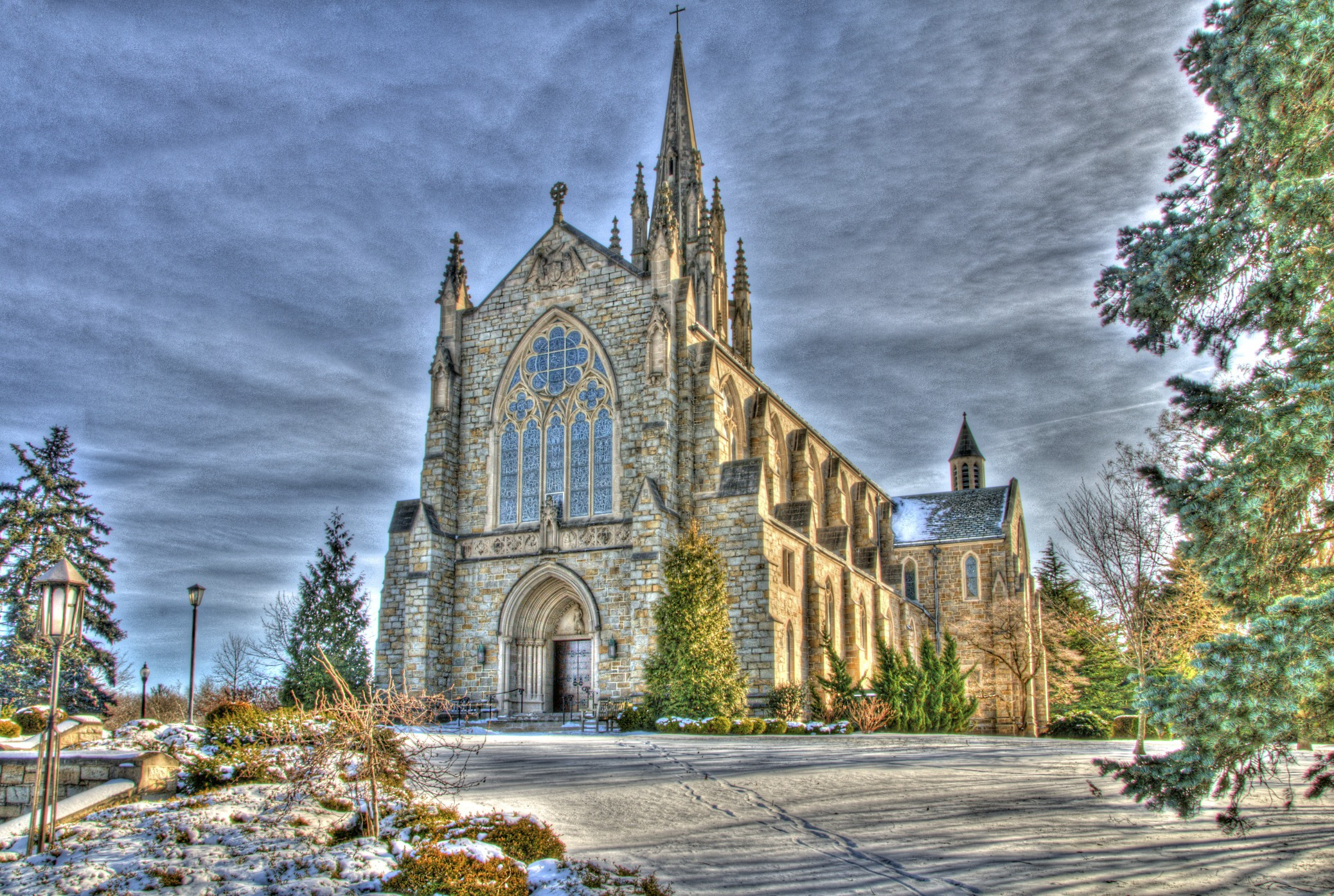
Irvine Memorial Chapel

The Swoope Carillon in Barker Tower of the Irvine Memorial Chapel is one of 163 traditional carillons in the United States. A gift of Mr. Henry B. Swoope, the original 43 bronze bells were cast in 1926 by the English firm of Gillett and Johnston of Croydon. The bells contain bits of historic metal collected worldwide by alumni and friends of the school, including copper coins, metal from Old Ironsides, pieces of artillery shells gathered from the fields of France in World War I, a shaving from the Liberty Bell, and bits from Admiral Nelson's flagship at Trafalgar, HMS Victory. The tower is named for Bryan Barker, the school's carillonneur for more than fifty years.

The chapel organ was a gift of Mr. and Mrs. George A. Wood. Built by the Skinner Organ Company of Boston in 1925, the organ has 55 stops, about 4,000 pipes, 27 couplers, and 33 adjustable combination pistons.

== Notable alumni ==
=== Medal of Honor recipients ===
- Joel Thompson Boone, United States Navy officer and physician
- Eugene B. Fluckey, United States Navy officer
- Ralph Talbot, United States Marine Corps aviator

=== Nobel Prize laureates ===
- Burton Richter, physicist

=== Olympic gold medalists ===
- Bill Carr 1929 – athletics, 400m and 4 × 400 m relay, 1932 Summer Olympics
- Harry Glancy 1924 – swimming, 4 × 200 m freestyle relay, 1924 Summer Olympics
- Robert Leavitt 1903 – athletics, 110m hurdles, 1906 Summer Olympics
- Ted Meredith 1912 – athletics, 800m and 4 × 400 m relay, 1912 Summer Olympics
- Betsy Mitchell 1983 – swimming, 4 × 100 m medley relay, 1984 Summer Olympics
- Charles Moore Jr. 1947 - athletics, 400m hurdles and 4 × 400 m relay, 1952 Summer Olympics
- Richard Saeger 1982 – swimming, 4 × 200 m freestyle relay, 1984 Summer Olympics
- Melvin Stewart 1988 – swimming, 200m butterfly and 4 × 100 m medley relay, 1992 Summer Olympics
- Allen Woodring 1918 – athletics, 200m, 1920 Summer Olympics

=== Academy Award winners ===
- Benicio del Toro, actor known for Traffic, The Usual Suspects, 21 Grams, and Che
- James Stewart, actor known for The Philadelphia Story, It's a Wonderful Life, and Mr. Smith Goes to Washington

=== Rhodes scholars ===
- Cresson H. Kearny, military officer and writer
- James M. Tunnell, lawyer, politician, and jurist

=== Academics ===
- Ann M. Blair, Carl H. Pforzheimer University Professor of History at Harvard University; 2002 MacArthur Fellows Program recipient

=== Arts and literature ===
- Bill Baldwin, science-fiction writer; known for The Helmsman series
- Luke Ebbin, composer and Grammy Award–nominated record producer
- Walker Evans, photographer
- Walter Farley, writer; known for The Black Stallion series
- William Seabrook, journalist, world traveler, and occultist

=== Business ===
- Joe L. Brown, general manager of the Pittsburgh Pirates
- Dick Cass, president of the Baltimore Ravens (National Football League)
- Edward E. Ford, businessman and philanthropist
- Jim Irsay, owner of the Indianapolis Colts
- Gerry Lenfest, founder of Suburban Cable (sold to Comcast in 2000) and member of the Forbes 400
- Charles C. Seabrook (1909–2003), executive who was an earlier pioneer in frozen food.
- Nicholas Taubman, CEO of Advance Auto Parts
- Dean Taylor, baseball executive/general manager of the Milwaukee Brewers
- Steven Zhang, chairman of the Inter Milan football club

=== Government and politics ===
- Nancy Abudu, judge of the United States Court of Appeals for the Eleventh Circuit
- Stewart H. Appleby, United States representative from New Jersey's 3rd congressional district
- John Coolidge, businessman and son of President Calvin Coolidge
- León Febres Cordero, president of Ecuador
- Harry Hughes, 57th governor of Maryland
- Charles Alvin Jones, judge of the United States Court of Appeals for the Third Circuit; chief justice of the Supreme Court of Pennsylvania
- John E. Jones III, judge of the United States District Court for the Middle District of Pennsylvania who decided the Kitzmiller v. Dover Area School District
- James N. Robertson, Pennsylvania State Representative for Delaware County
- Nicholas Taubman, United States ambassador to Romania
- Dick Thornburgh, 41st governor of Pennsylvania and United States attorney general
- James Buchanan, 15th President of the United States

=== Journalism ===
- Rebecca Lowe, television sportscaster for NBC (formerly with ESPN UK, the BBC, and Setanta Sports)

=== Military ===
- Wilbert Wallace White, decorated World War I flying ace

=== Performing arts ===
- Vanessa Branch, actress known for Pirates of the Caribbean, Orbit Gum commercials; Miss Vermont 1994
- Michael Davies, executive producer of Who Wants to Be a Millionaire?, Wife Swap, Power of 10, and Men in Blazers
- William Davies, screenwriter known for Flushed Away, Twins, Grumpy Old Men
- Dick Foran (1910–1979), actor and singer, known for his performances in Western musicals and for playing supporting roles in dramatic pictures
- Sean Kanan, actor known for The Karate Kid Part III, General Hospital, The Bold and the Beautiful
- Emily Maynard, winner of The Bachelor and star of The Bachelorette
- Ben Mendelsohn, actor known for Bloodline, The Dark Knight Rises, Mississippi Grind, "Captain Marvel (film)", and "Secret Invasion (miniseries)".
- John Payne, actor known for Miracle on 34th Street, Sentimental Journey, and many other film and television roles

=== Sports ===
- Joe Birmingham, Major League Baseball player; first manager of the Cleveland Indians
- Bob Books, American football player, Frankford Yellow Jackets (NFL)
- Josh Edgin, pitcher for the New York Mets
- Bump Hadley, major-league pitcher and Boston Red Sox television broadcaster
- Roy Lechthaler, American football player for the Philadelphia Eagles
- Stéphane Pelle, Cameroonian professional basketball player
- Vincent Rey, linebacker for the Cincinnati Bengals
- Mark Talbott, inducted into the United States Squash Hall of Fame in 2000
- Jack Taylor, holder of the NCAA basketball single-game scoring record (138 points)
