= Roy Lechthaler =

American football player (1908–1980)

No. 34
- Position: Guard

Personal information
- Born: April 1, 1908; New Cumberland, Pennsylvania, U.S.
- Died: December 16, 1980 (aged 72); Harrisburg, Pennsylvania, U.S.
- Listed height: 5 ft 10 in (1.78 m)
- Listed weight: 198 lb (90 kg)

Career information
- High school: Mercersburg Academy (Mercersburg, Pennsylvania)
- College: Lebanon Valley

Career history
- Philadelphia Eagles (1933)
- Stats at Pro Football Reference

Melvin Roy Lechthaler Jr. (April 1, 1908 – December 16, 1980) was an American professional football guard who played one season with the Philadelphia Eagles of the National Football League (NFL). He played college football at Lebanon Valley College.

== Early life and college ==
Melvin Roy Lechthaler was born on April 1, 1908, in New Cumberland, Pennsylvania. He attended New Cumberland High School in New Cumberland, and Mercersburg Academy in Mercersburg, Pennsylvania.

Lechthaler played college football at Lebanon Valley College as a center and tackle.

== Professional career ==
On September 1, 1933, it was announced that Lechthaler had signed with the Philadelphia Eagles of the National Football League. He played in four games, starting one, as a guard for the Eagles during the 1933 season. He wore jersey number 34 while with the Eagles. Lechthaler stood 5'10" and weighed 198 pounds.

Lechthaler also spent time playing football for the All Lancaster team.

== Personal life ==
Lechthaler died on December 16, 1980, in Harrisburg, Pennsylvania.
