= Bill Baldwin =

American writer

- Born: June 6, 1935
- Died: October 14, 2015 (aged 80)
- Education: Mercersburg Academy; University of Pittsburgh (BA, MLitt)
- Occupation: Novelist
- Writing career
- Genre: Science fiction

Bill (Merl. W Jr.) Baldwin (June 6, 1935 – October 14, 2015) was an American science fiction writer. He wrote militaristic space opera. His main series is about a male protagonist named Wilf Ansor Brim.

He graduated from The Mercersburg Academy and the University of Pittsburgh, where he earned a B.A. in Journalism and a Master of Letters degree. He served as a lieutenant at the U.S. Air Force Missile Test Center. He worked at NASA at Cape Canaveral, Florida supporting Project Mercury as Chief of the Reports Division. Later, Baldwin served as a contractor for the NASA Manned Spacecraft Center.

He was the president of the Wooden Boat Association of north Texas. He was also the managing editor of the magazine The Brass Bell of the Chris-Craft Antique Boat Club. He and others helped create the Lawson Boating Heritage Center on Chautauqua Lake, Bemus Point, New York.

== Published works ==
=== The Helmsman Saga ===
- The Helmsman (1985)
- Galactic Convoy (1987)
- The Trophy (1990)
- The Mercenaries (1991)
- The Defenders (1992)
- The Siege (1994)
- The Defiance (1996)
- "Last Ship to Haefdon" (2002, a short story taking place decades after the novels' events)
- The Turning Tide (2011)

Several books of the original Helmsman saga, The Siege, The Defenders and The Defiance in particular, were influenced by the World War II autobiography titled The Big Show (written by Pierre Clostermann).

Baldwin's work contains allusions to other science fiction works. For example, Galactic Convoy mentions a planet named Throon (the capital world in the Star Kings books). The Turning Tide features a freighter captain named Verger Antillies.

This series began in 1985 but was later reprinted in "Director's Cut Special Editions" by Timberwolf Press. Also, as of October 2012, rewritten versions of the first four books have been made available in both paper and electronic form.

=== Other works ===
- Canby's Legion (1995)
- The Enigma Strategy (2006)

At the time of his death, Bill was working on a novel entitled "Heisenberg's U-Boat" and was starting on a final Wilf Brim book.
