= Richard Rummell =

Landscape artist and illustrator

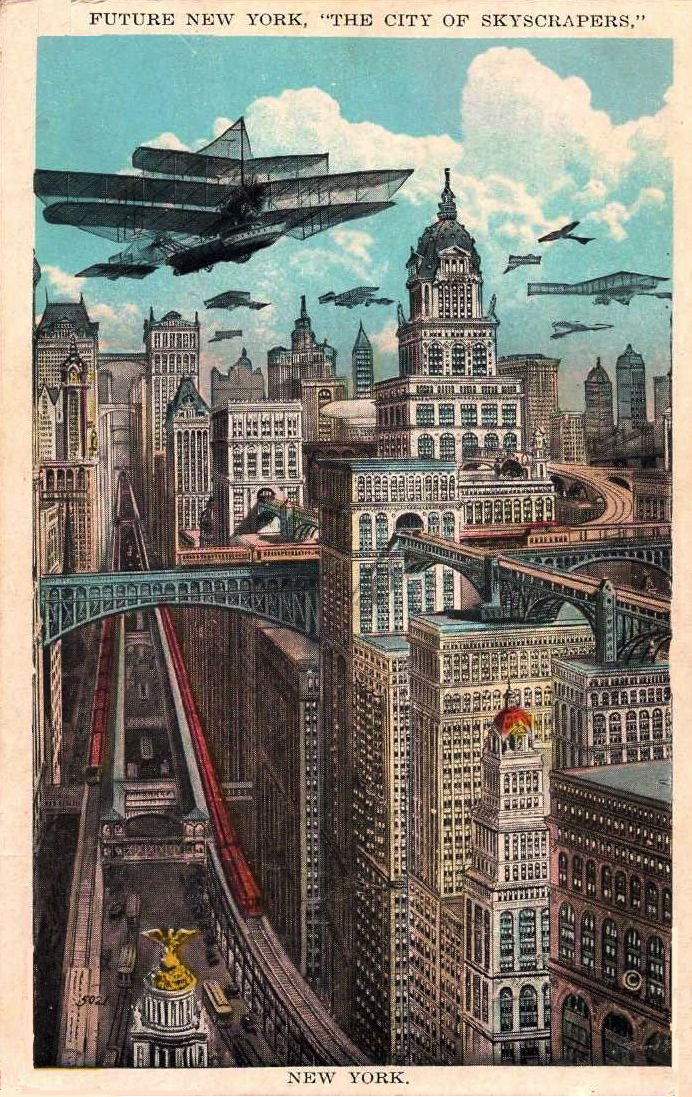
Cover illustration for The Delineator newspaper (1911)

Richard W. Rummell (1848–1924) was a landscape artist and illustrator in the United States. His work includes bird's eye views of college campuses and futurist cityscapes.

== History ==
He was commissioned be W. T. Littig & Company around 1900 for a series watercolors depictions of American colleges and universities. The panorama views are from an altitude of about 300 feet. His paintings were engraved on copper plates and sold in limited editions. In 1910 some sepia colored versions were produced. One of the W. T. Littig & Company's advertisements is extant.

In the 1960s, artist Paul Victorius purchased the engraved copper plates and made hand-colored drawing from them with watercolors. He sold them through alumni offices.

== Work ==
He produced views of colleges and universities including:

- Brown University
- Bucknell University
- Dickinson College
- Harvard University
- Princeton University
- Smith College
- University of Chicago
- University of Illinois
- University of Michigan
- University of North Carolina
- University of Pennsylvania
- University of Virginia
- Vassar College
- West Point Military Academy
- Yale University

His other depictions include:

- Mercersburg Academy
- Panama Canal
- "New York of the Future"
- "Bird's Eye View of New York City" (1896)

== Gallery ==
Selected works

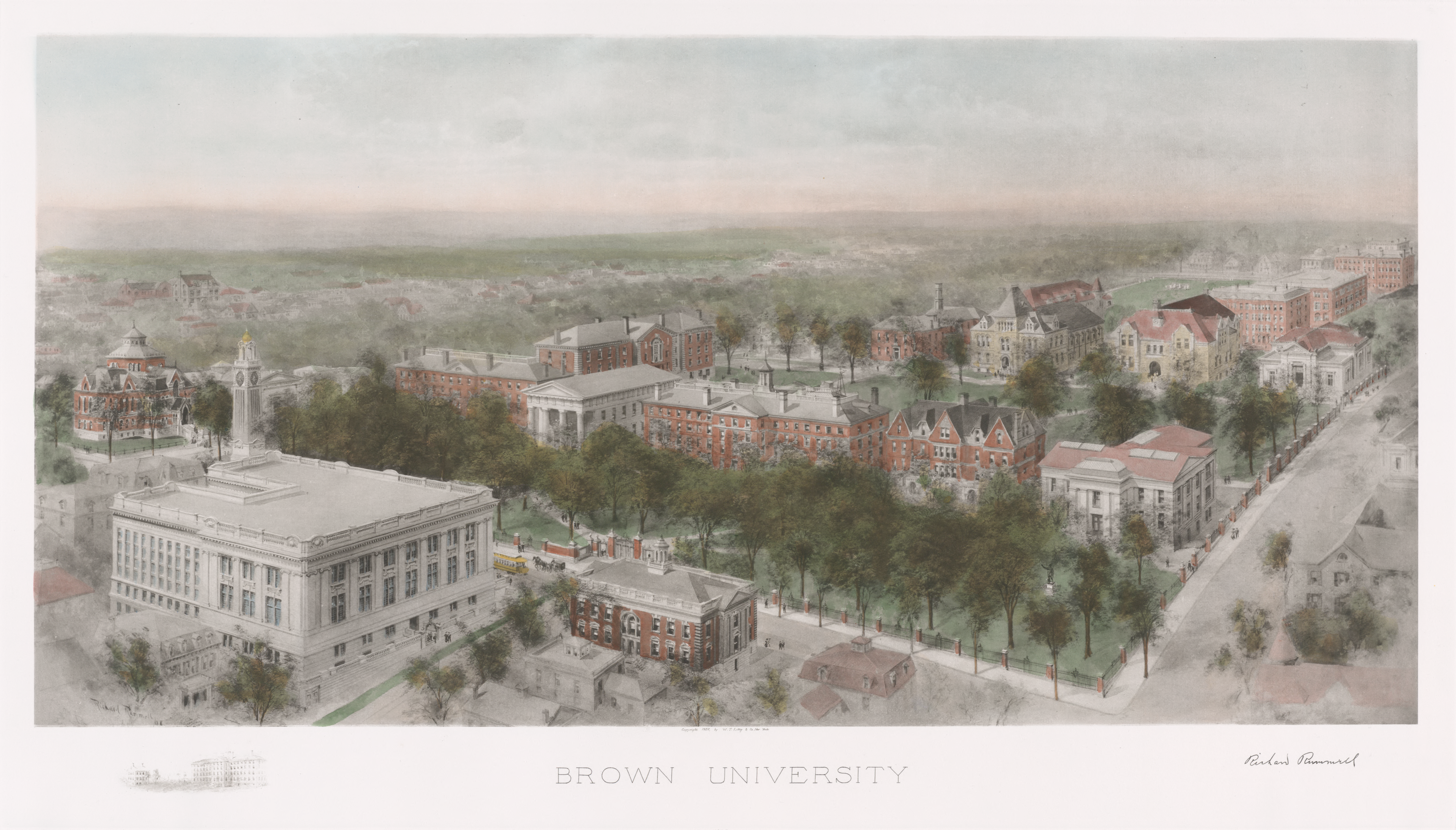
Brown University (1900)

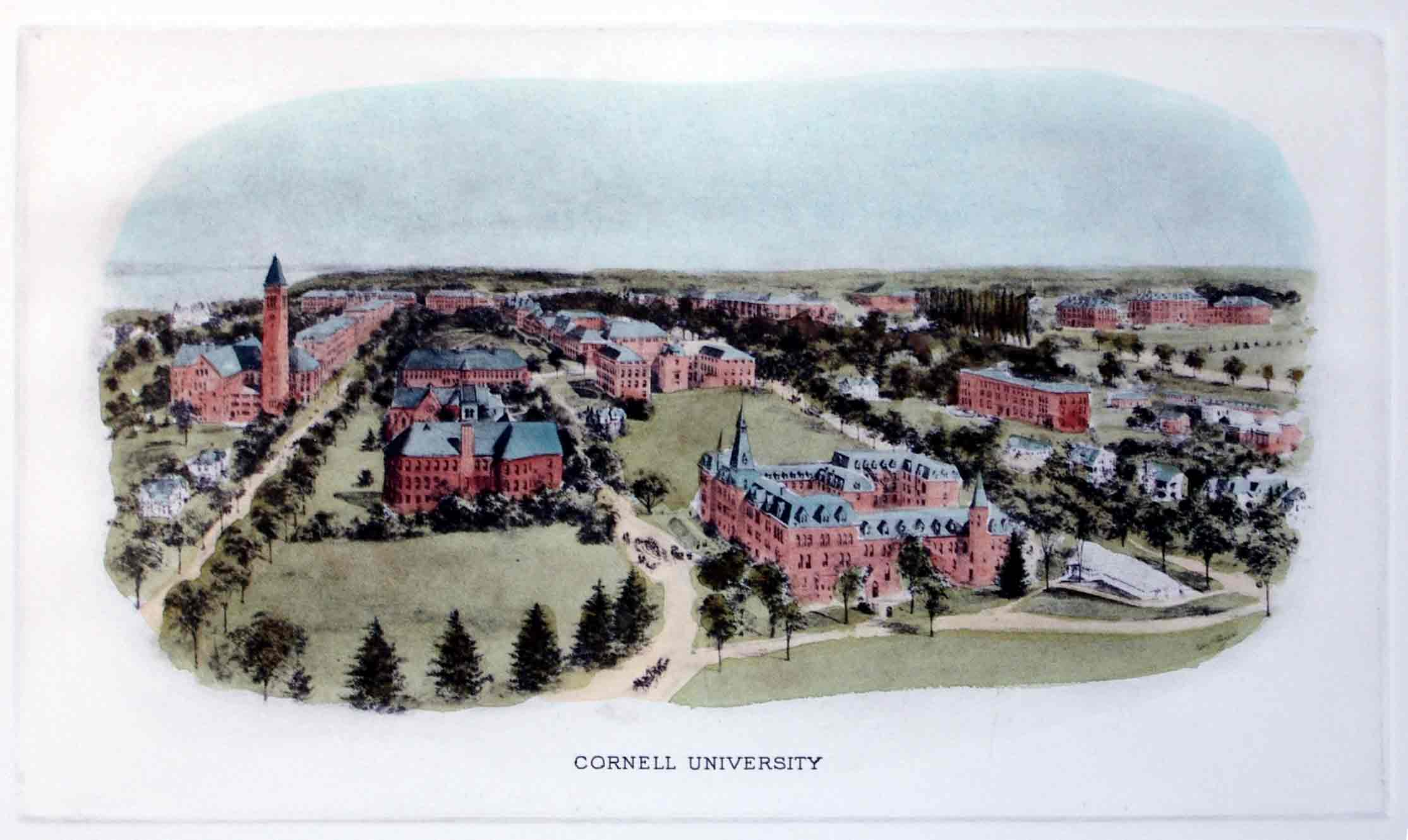
Cornell University (1910)

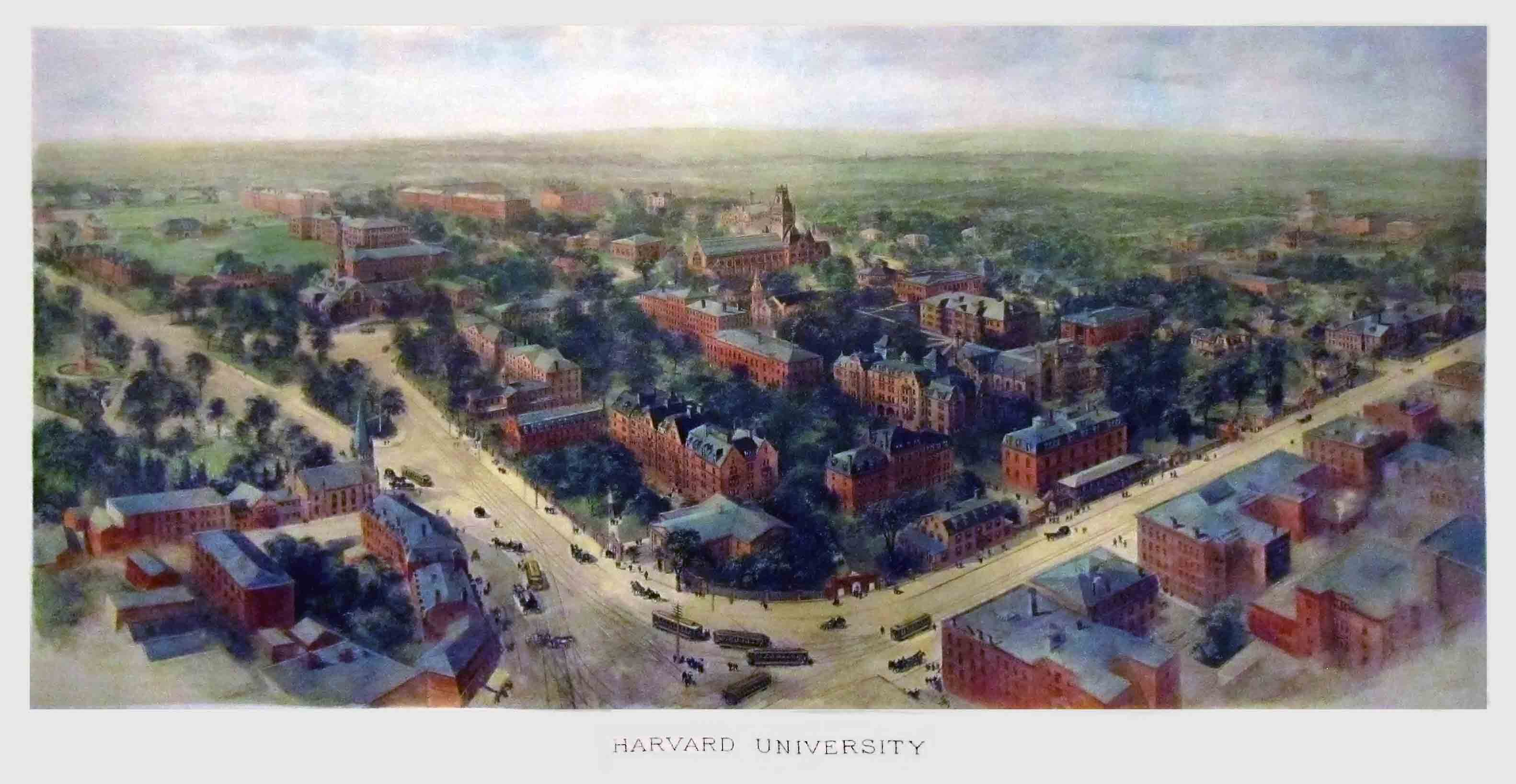
Harvard University (1906)

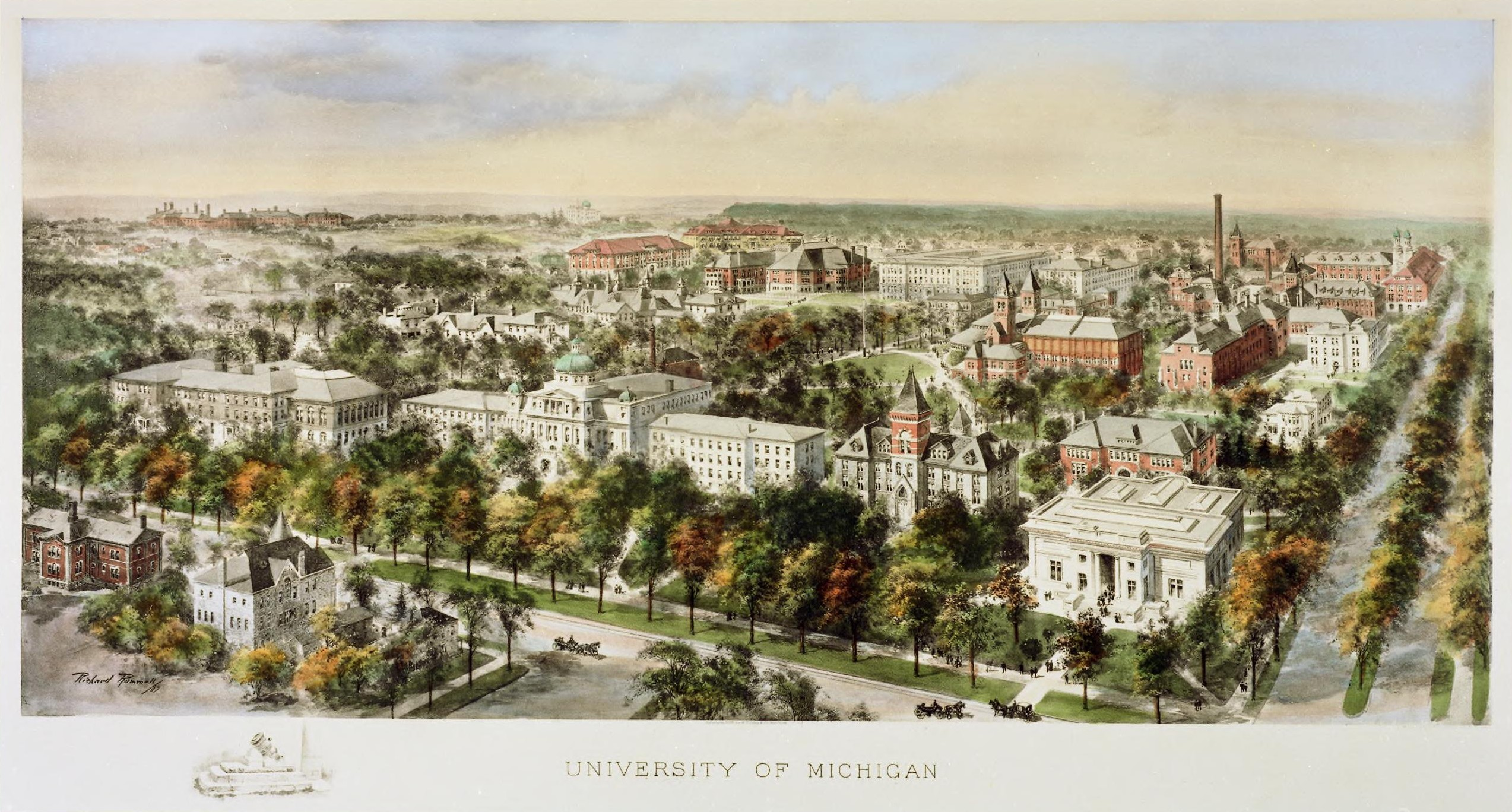
University of Michigan (1907)

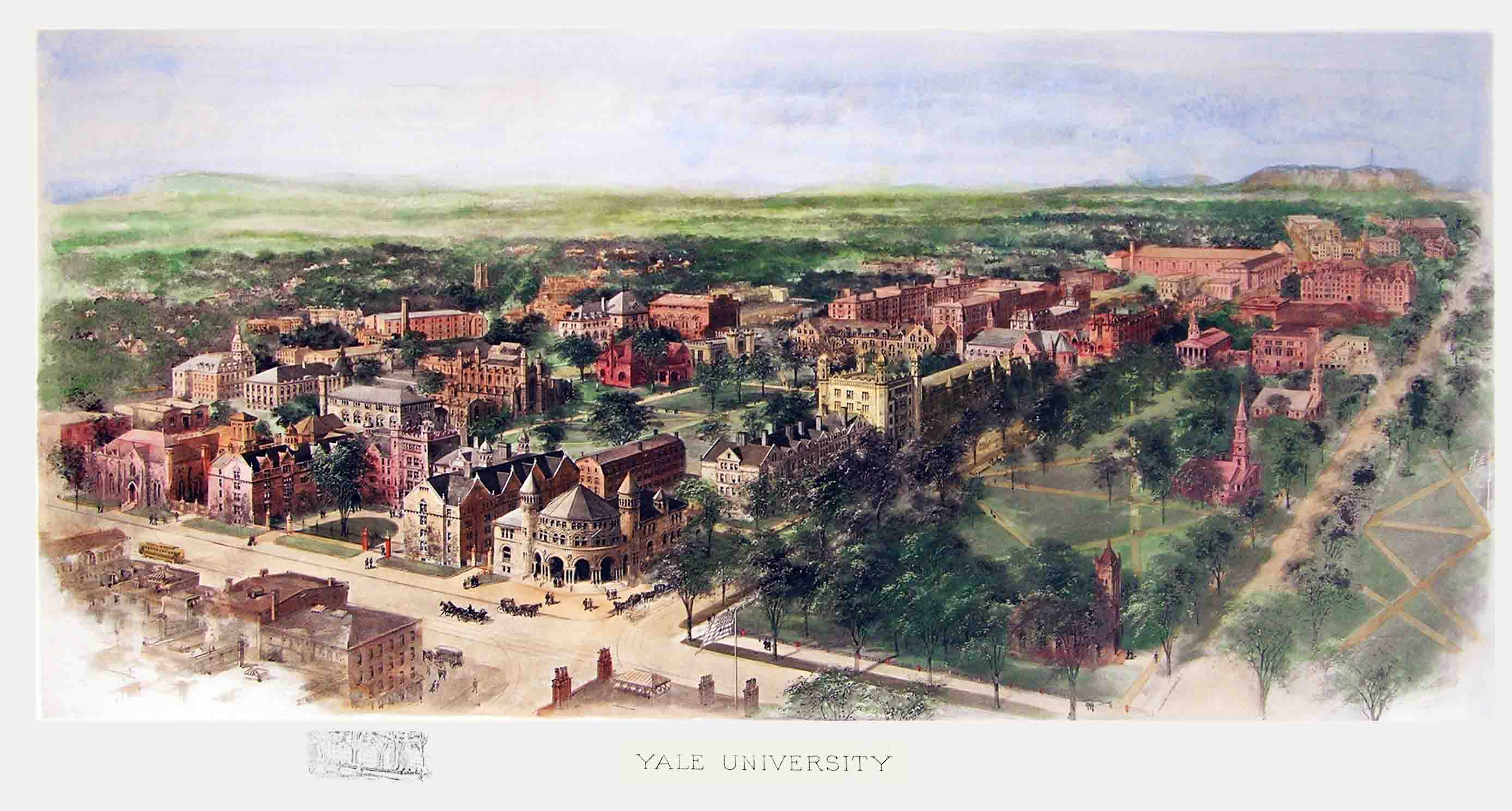
Yale University (1910)

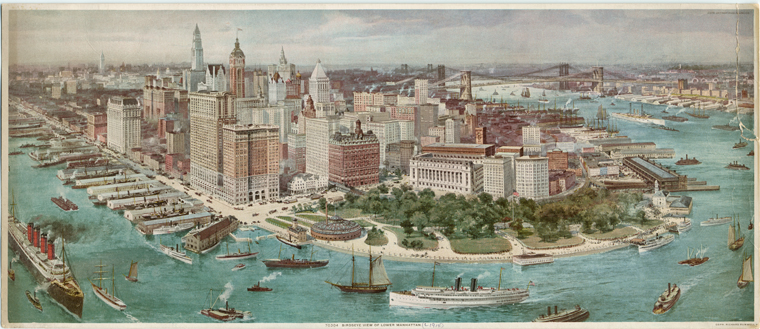
Lower Manhattan (1914)

== See also ==
- Aerostation
- Panoramic painting
- Photogravure
- Albert Robida
- Aerial perspective
- Landscape painting
