= Mercersburg Historic District =

Historic district in Pennsylvania, United States

- U.S. National Register of Historic Places
- U.S. Historic district
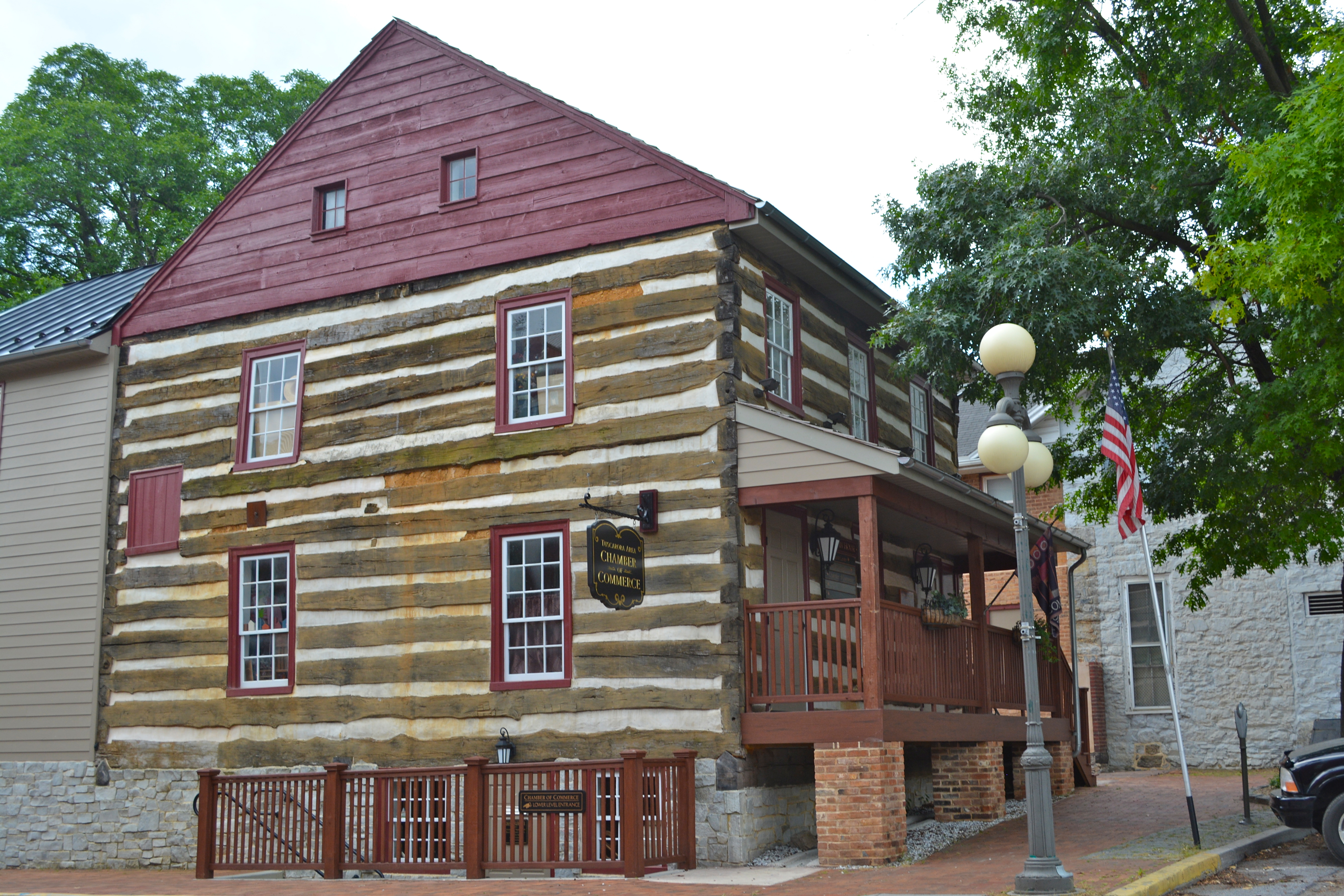
- Irwin House

- Location within Pennsylvania Location within the United States
- Location: Main and Seminary Sts., Mercersburg, Pennsylvania
- Coordinates: 39°49′38″N 77°54′12″W
- Area: 36 acres (15 ha)
- Built: 1759
- Architectural style: Greek Revival, Late Victorian, Federal, Colonial Revival, Other, Cumberland Valley Vernacular
- NRHP reference No.: 78002403, 89000358 (Boundary Increase)
- Added to NRHP: December 13, 1978, May 17, 1989 (Boundary Increase)

The Mercersburg Historic District is a national historic district that is centered on the center square of Mercersburg in Franklin County, Pennsylvania.

It was listed on the National Register of Historic Places in 1978, with a boundary increase added in 1989.

== History and architectural features ==
This district includes 124 contributing buildings and one contributing site that are located in the central business district and surrounding residential areas of Mercersburg. The residential buildings include a number of sheathed log, stone, and brick dwellings, with some dating to the eighteenth century. The district has a number of notable examples of the Federal, Greek Revival, and Colonial Revival styles.

Notable non-residential buildings include the Presbyterian Church (1794, 1885), United Church of Christ (1845), Mansion House Hotel, The James Buchanan Hotel, McKinstry Building, and First National Bank. Also located in the district but separately listed is the Lane House.

== Gallery ==
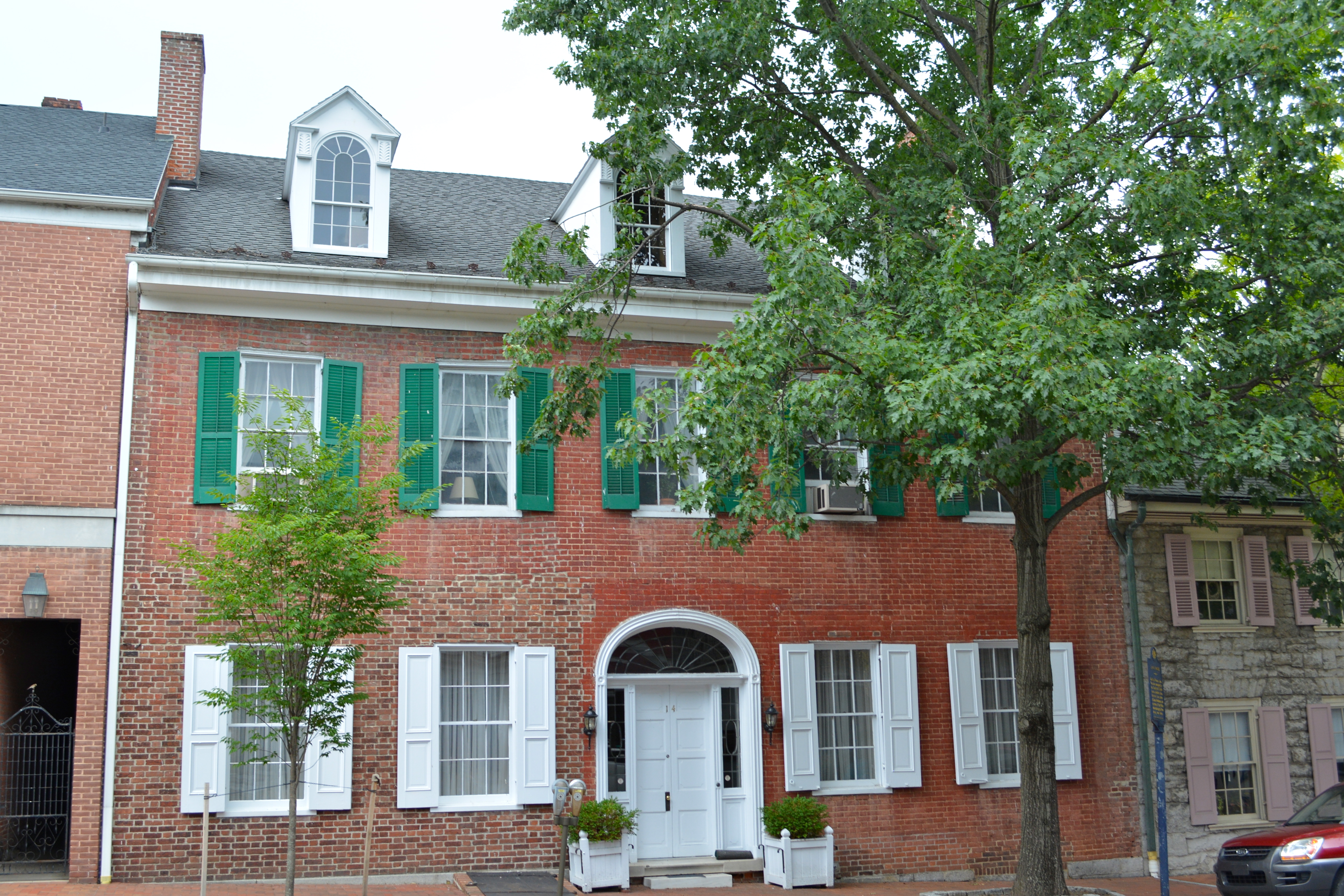
Lane House on Main Street

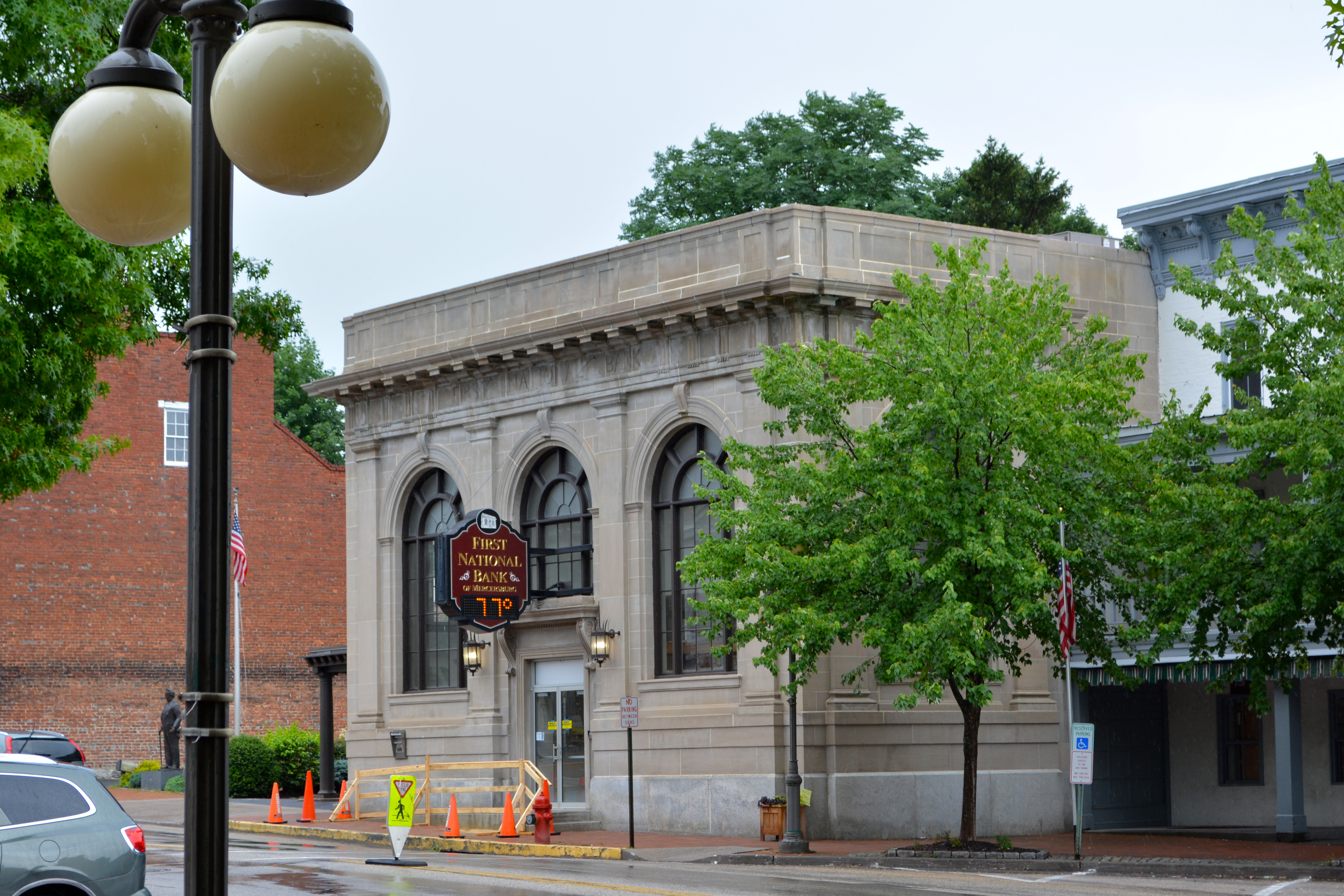
First National Bank

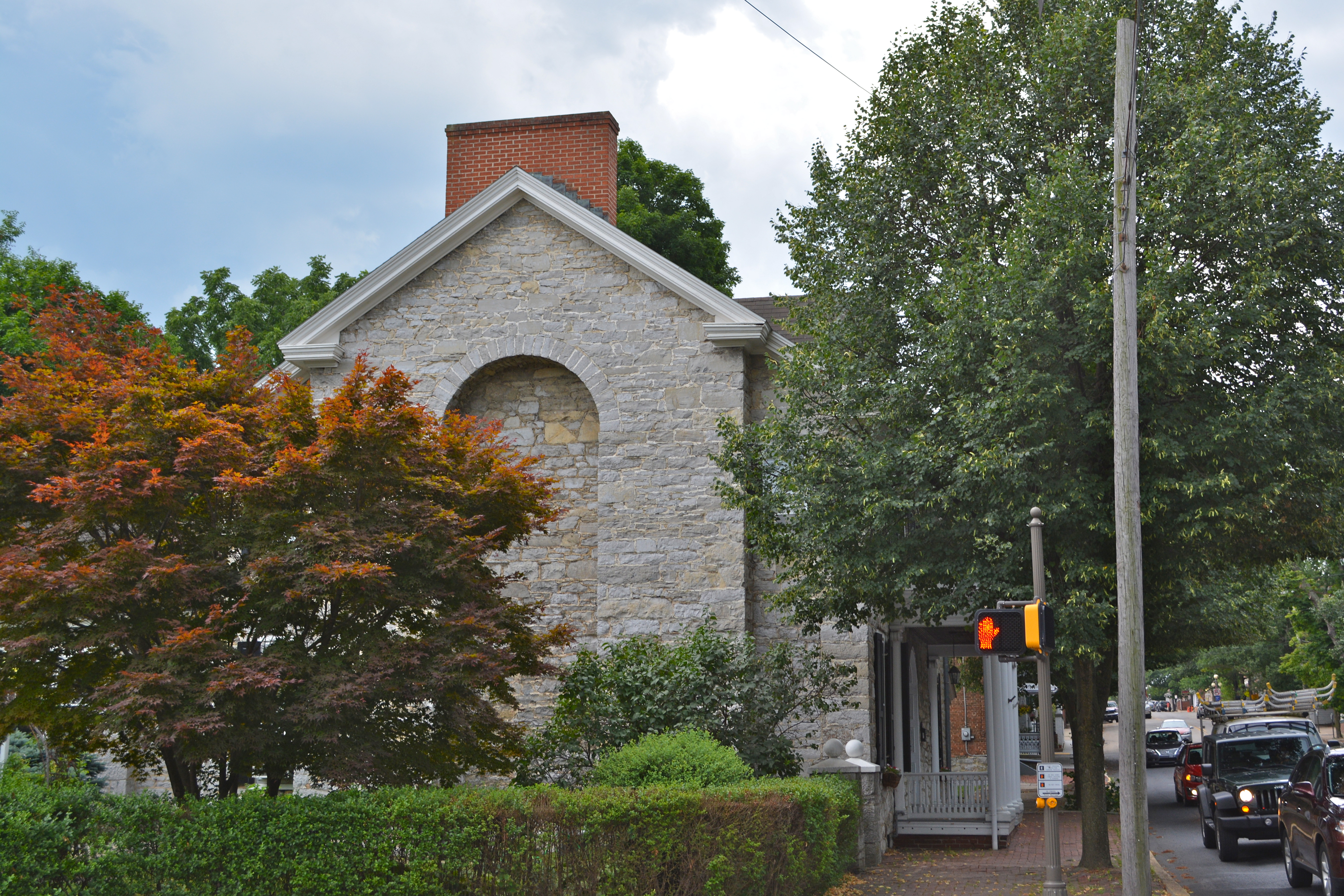
47 North Main St.

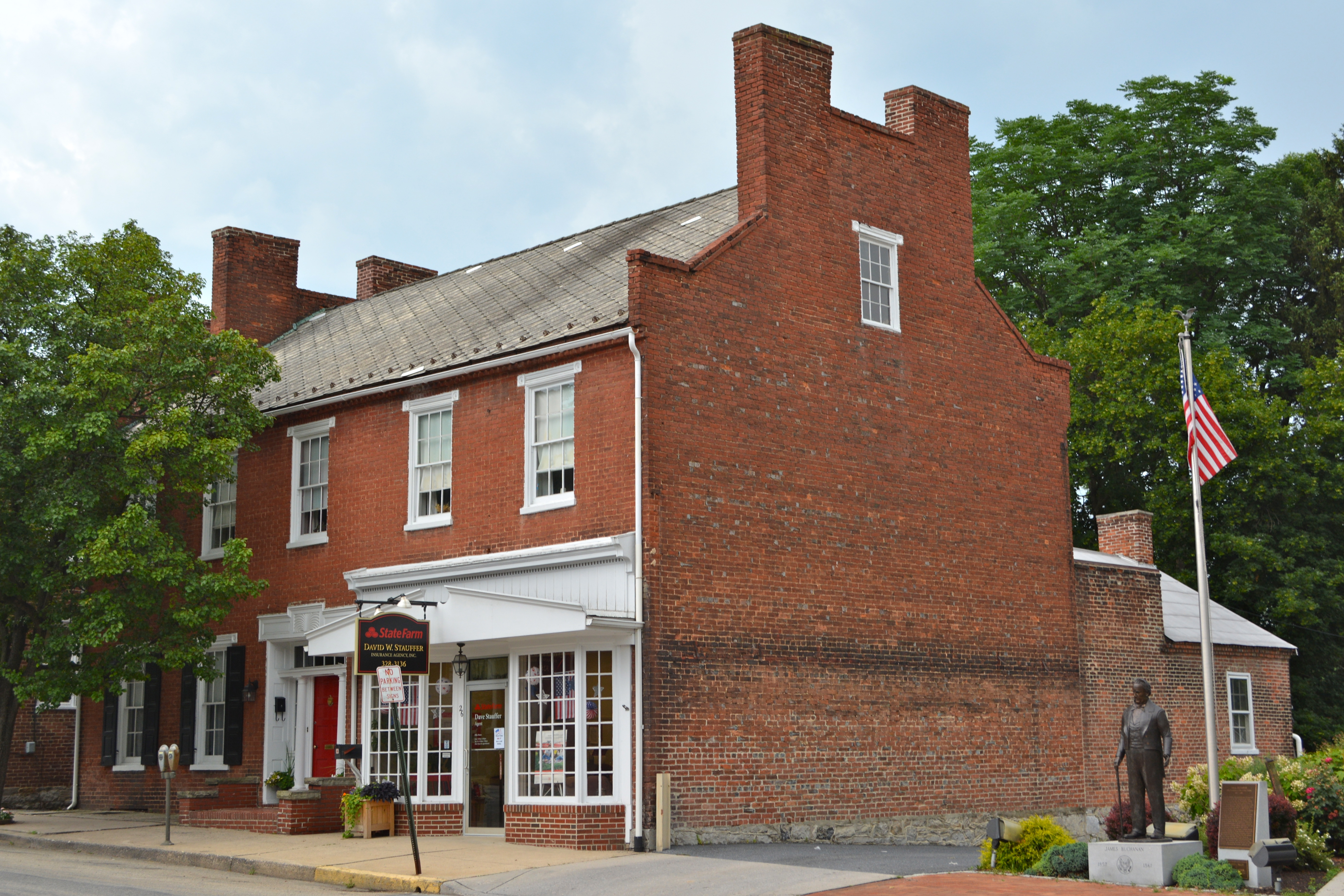
26 South Main St.

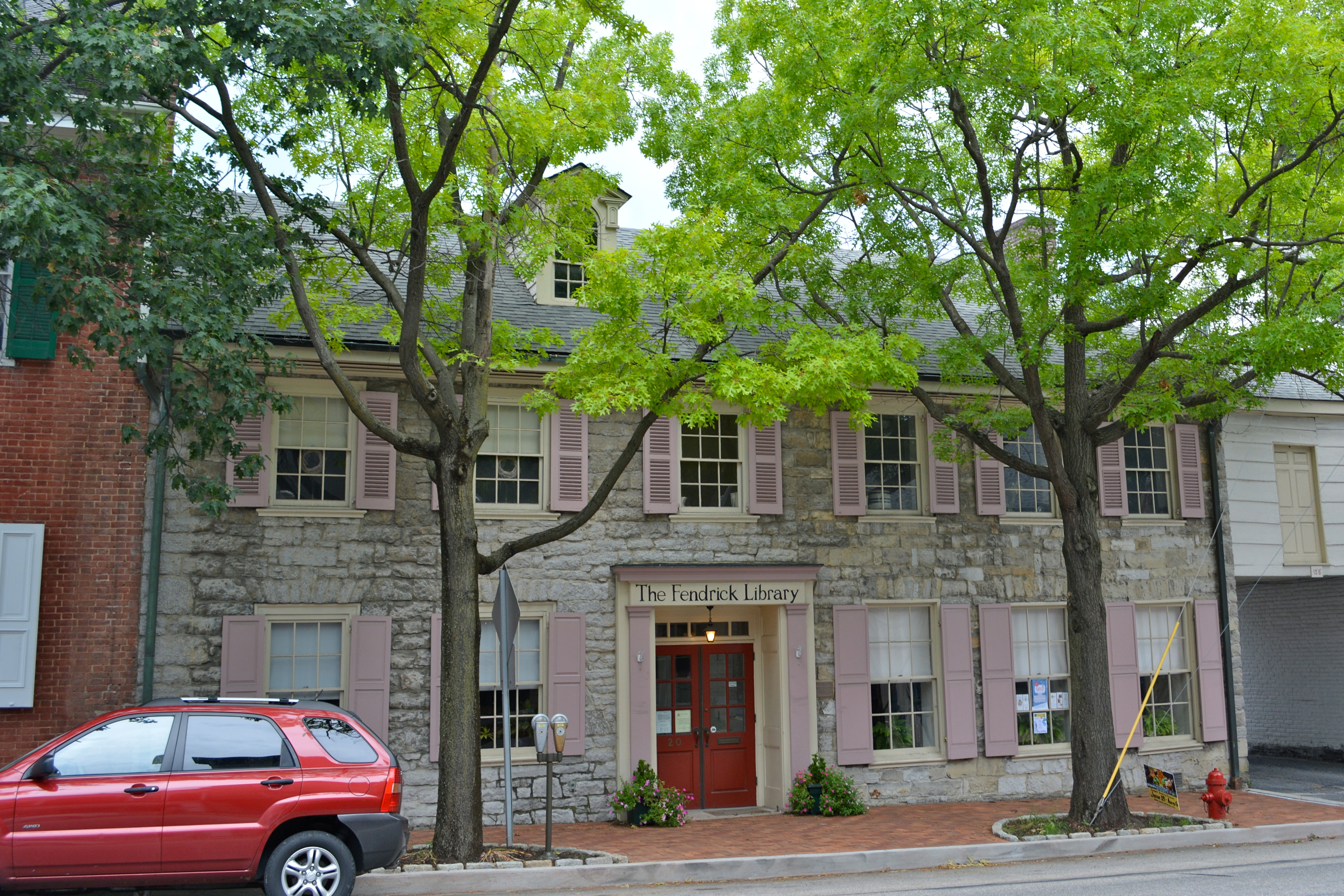
Fendrick Library

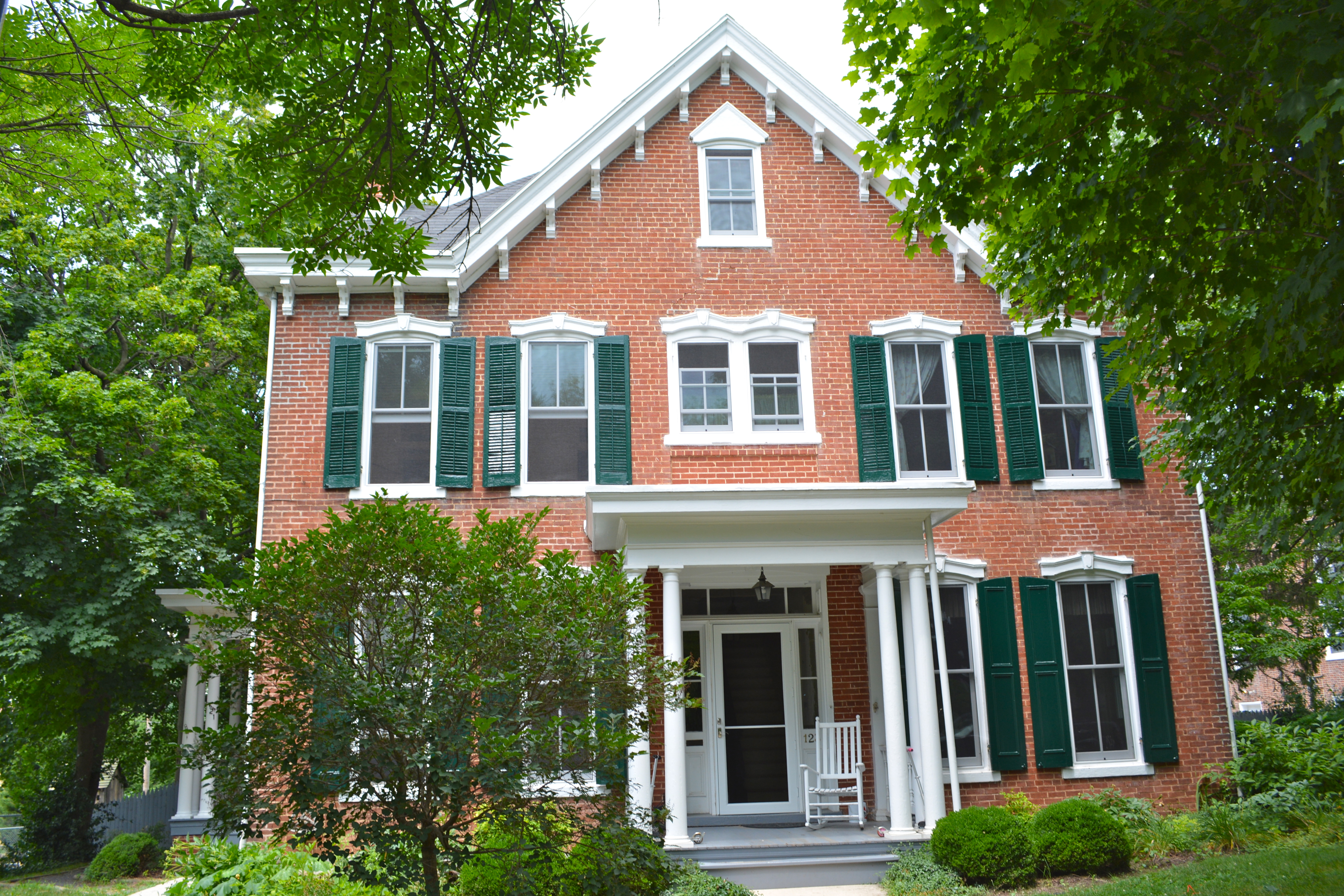
123 Seminary St.

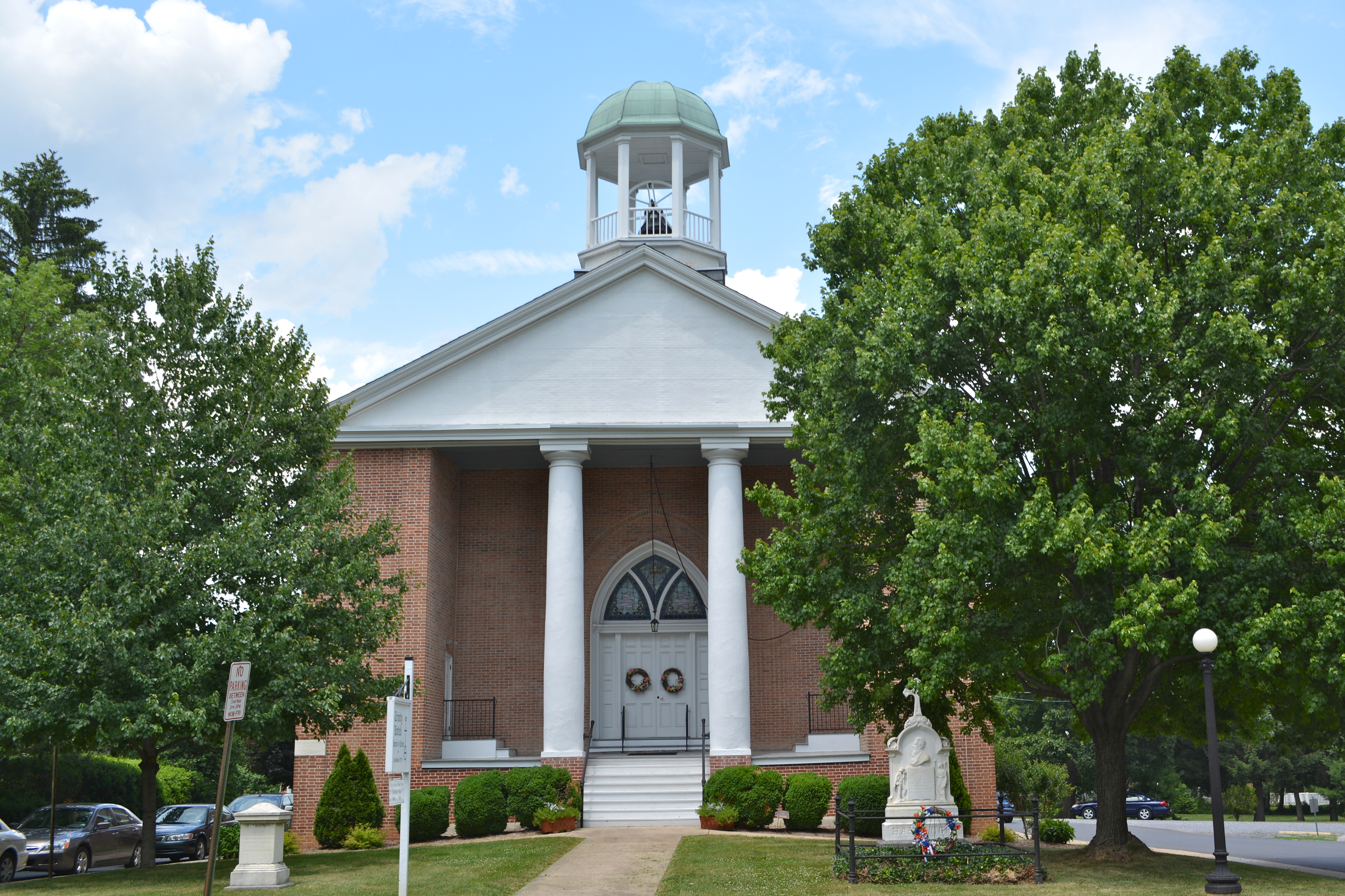
Trinity United Church of Christ
