= Mercersburg, Pennsylvania =

Borough in Pennsylvania, US

- Borough
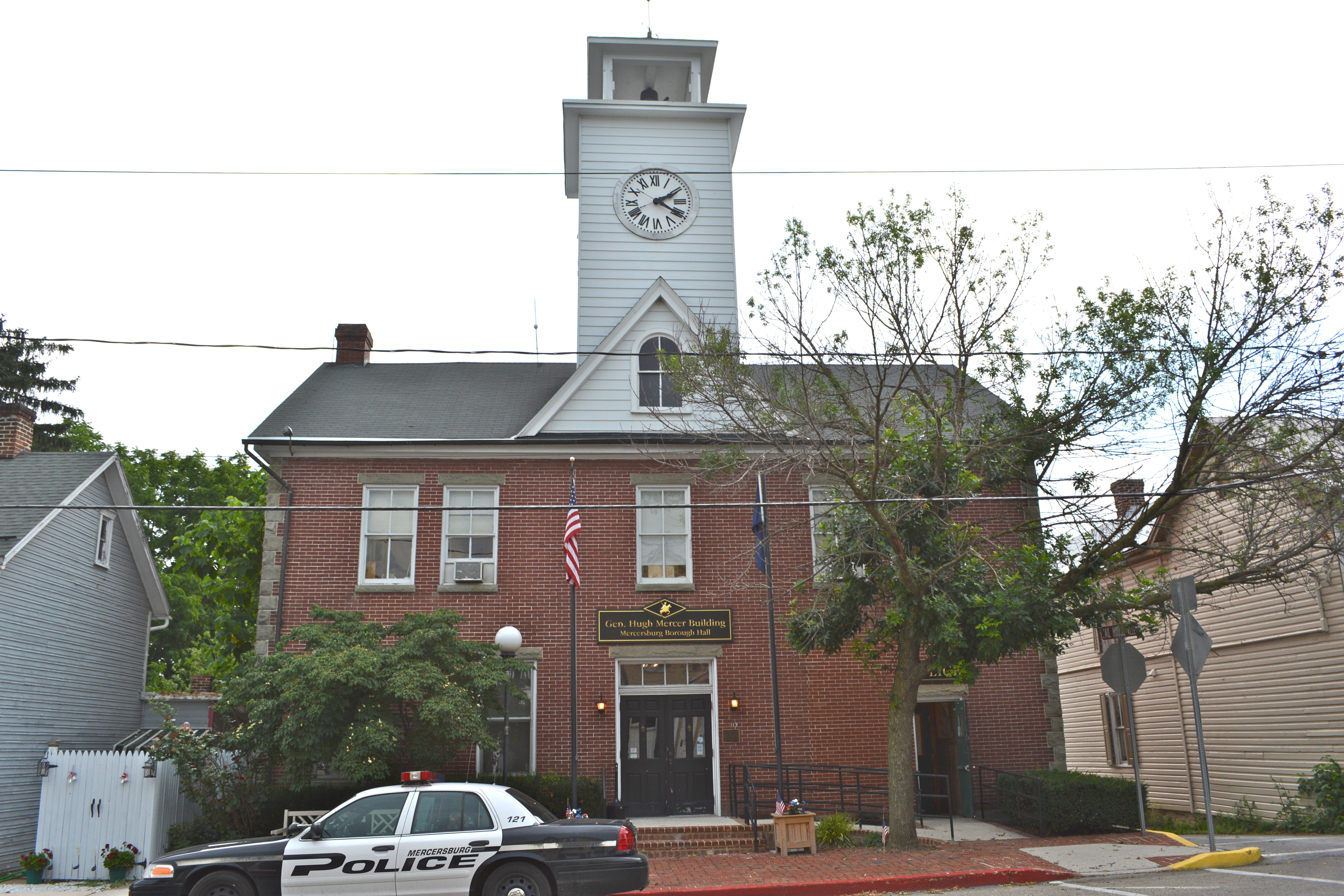
- Mercersburg Borough Hall

- Location of Mercersburg in Franklin County, Pennsylvania.

- Location within Pennsylvania Location within the United States
- Coordinates: 39°49′55″N 77°54′10″W
- Country: United States
- State: Pennsylvania
- County: Franklin
- Named for: Hugh Mercer

Government
  - Type: Borough Council
  - Mayor: Michael Pederson

Area
  - Total: 0.90 sq mi (2.34 km^{2})
  - Land: 0.90 sq mi (2.34 km^{2})
  - Water: 0 sq mi (0.00 km^{2})
- Elevation: 548 ft (167 m)

Population (2020)
  - Total: 1,507
  - Density: 1,670.9/sq mi (645.12/km^{2})
- Time zone: UTC-5 (Eastern (EST))
  - Summer (DST): UTC-4 (EDT)
- ZIP Code: 17236
- Area code: 717
- FIPS code: 42-48704
- GNIS feature ID: 1215245
- Website: borough.mercersburg.org

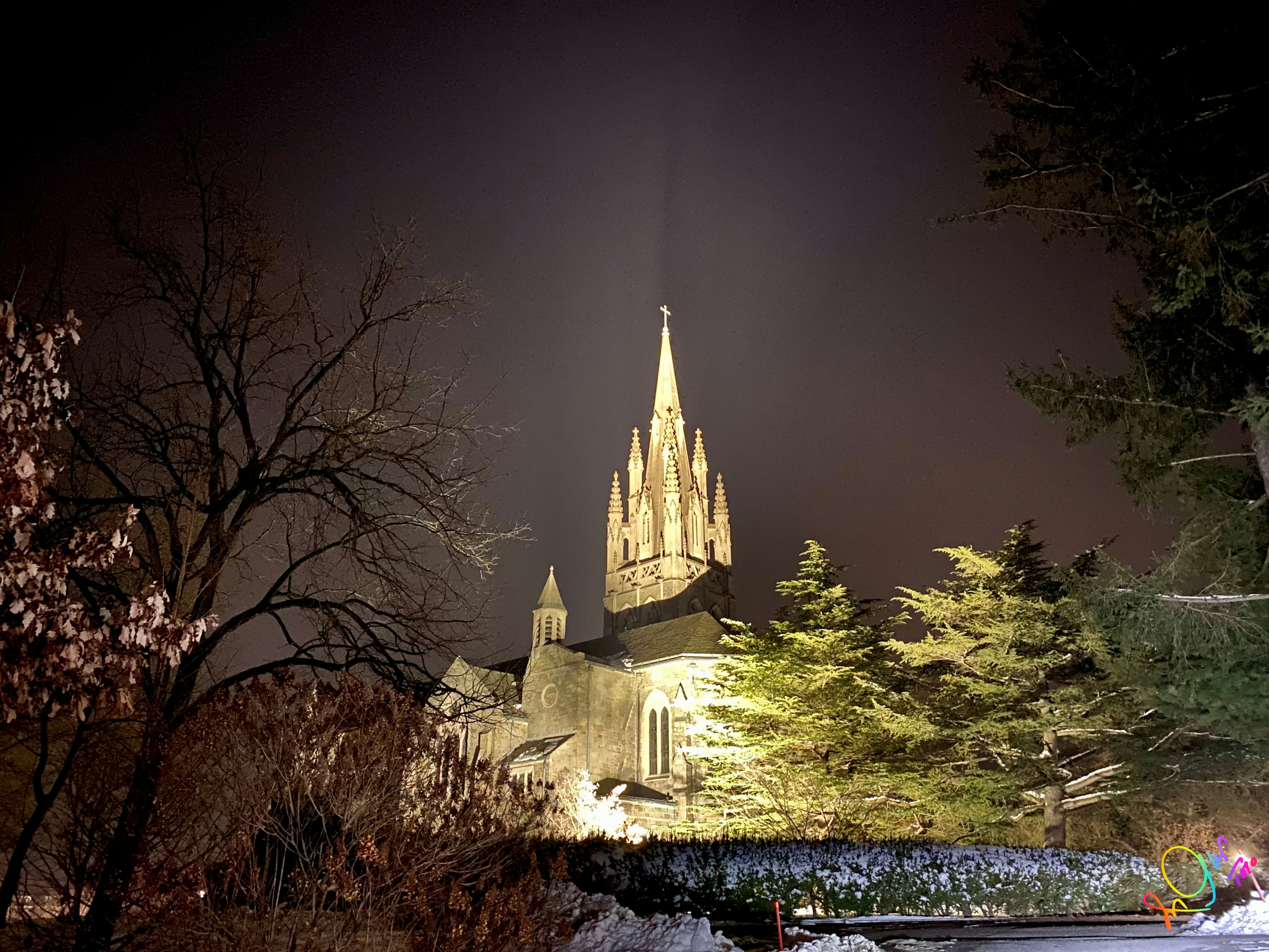
Mercersburg Academy Chapel

Mercersburg is a borough in Franklin County, Pennsylvania, United States. The borough is 72 miles (116 km) southwest of Harrisburg, the state capital. As of the 2020 census, Mercersburg had a population of 1,507.

Due to its location in a rural area, it had a relatively large percentage of African-American workers who had been enslaved from the Revolution. It was called "Black Town" in the early 19th century before incorporation under its current name. Refugee African Americans escaping from slavery in the South also settled here, and the area was known as "Little Africa".

== History ==
The land currently known as Mercersburg was previously territory of the Massawomeck people who were part of the Iroquois Nation.

Mercersburg was platted in 1780. The borough was named after Hugh Mercer, a general and hero in the American Revolutionary War. A post office has been in operation at Mercersburg since 1812.

Located near the southern border of Pennsylvania, the rural community became a place of refuge during the antebellum years for escaped African Americans who had been enslaved in the South. Some came to the area via the Underground Railroad. After the American Revolution, Pennsylvania had abolished slavery. In this area were communities of free African Americans who had worked in agriculture. It was relatively easy for refugees to join their communities after passing over the border of Maryland.

This settlement was called "Black Town" in early years, before being incorporated in 1831. The rural area outside of town was referred to by locals as "Little Africa" because of its relatively large concentration of African Americans in this time period. Some were refugees who had settled here after escaping from slavery in the South.

In later years, black folks moved away from here as they were at risk from slavecatchers, especially after passage of the Fugitive Slave Act in 1850, which had more stringent rules against free states. Many African Americans moved to Philadelphia, which had a large and free black community, which helped new arrivals get settled. Philadelphia also provided more job opportunities.

In 2010, 6.49% of the population was of African American descent, out of a total of 1,561 persons.

The Mercersburg Historic District, Lane House, and Mercersburg Academy are listed on the National Register of Historic Places.

== Geography ==
Mercersburg is located in southwestern Franklin County and has a total area of 0.89 square miles (2.3 km^{2}), all land.

Mercersburg is located at the eastern foot of Cove Mountain on the west side of the Great Appalachian Valley. The borough is 7.5 miles (12.1 km) north of the Mason–Dixon line, which serves as the state border with Maryland. Whitetail Ski Resort and golf course are located 7 miles (11 km) south of the town.

Pennsylvania state highways 16, 75, and 416 all pass through Mercersburg. PA 16 leads east 10 miles (16 km) to Greencastle and 11 miles (18 km) to Interstate 81, and northwest through Cove Gap and over Tuscarora Mountain 10 miles to McConnellsburg. PA 75 leads north 6 miles (10 km) to Fort Loudon and south 7.5 miles (12.1 km) to the Maryland border. PA 416 leads northeast 7 miles (11 km) to U.S. Route 30 near St. Thomas and southeast 10 miles (16 km) to the Maryland border. Hagerstown, Maryland, is 17 miles (27 km) to the southeast via PA 416 and Maryland Route 58, while Chambersburg, the Franklin County seat, is 16 miles (26 km) to the northeast via PA 416 and US 30.

== Demographics ==
Historical population
Census	Pop.	Note	%±
1840	1,143		—
1850	1,179		3.1%
1860	897		−23.9%
1870	971		8.2%
1880	970		−0.1%
1890	967		−0.3%
1900	956		−1.1%
1910	1,410		47.5%
1920	1,663		17.9%
1930	1,634		−1.7%
1940	1,763		7.9%
1950	1,613		−8.5%
1960	1,759		9.1%
1970	1,727		−1.8%
1980	1,617		−6.4%
1990	1,640		1.4%
2000	1,540		−6.1%
2010	1,561		1.4%
2020	1,507		−3.5%

As of the census of 2000, there were 1,540 people, 686 households, and 439 families residing in the borough. The population density was 1,581.0 inhabitants per square mile (610.4/km^{2}). There were 770 housing units at an average density of 790.5 per square mile (305.2/km^{2}). The racial makeup of the borough was 92.08% White, 6.49% African American, 0.58% Asian, 0.52% from other races, and 0.32% from two or more races. Hispanic or Latino of any race were 1.36% of the population.

There were 686 households, out of which 30.8% had children under the age of 18 living with them, 48.8% were married couples living together, 11.2% had a female householder with no husband present, and 36.0% were non-families. 32.4% of all households were made up of individuals, and 14.7% had someone living alone who was 65 years of age or older. The average household size was 2.24 and the average family size was 2.80.

In the borough the population was spread out, with 23.6% under the age of 18, 6.5% from 18 to 24, 29.7% from 25 to 44, 22.7% from 45 to 64, and 17.4% who were 65 years of age or older. The median age was 39 years. For every 100 females there were 88.3 males. For every 100 females age 18 and over, there were 88.8 males.

The median income for a household in the borough was $32,619, and the median income for a family was $46,042. Males had a median income of $30,602 versus $23,000 for females. The per capita income for the borough was $18,934. About 7.2% of families and 8.6% of the population were below the poverty line, including 7.5% of those under age 18 and 10.2% of those age 65 or over.

== Education ==
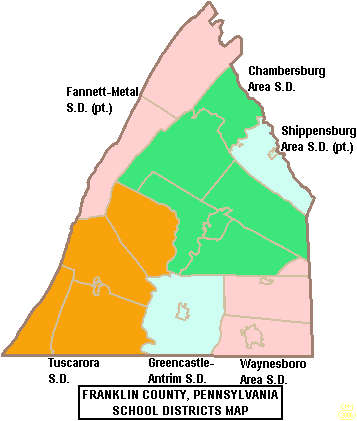
Franklin County school districts

=== Tuscarora School District ===
The Tuscarora School District covers an area of 201 square miles (520 km^{2}), stretching north-south from just south of 40 degrees north latitude to the Maryland border and from east of the 78 degree west longitude line to just west of Chambersburg. The district is located within the borders of Franklin County in south-central Pennsylvania. It includes the borough of Mercersburg and Montgomery, Peters, St. Thomas and Warren townships. The school district primarily encompasses a rural agricultural area with a total population of approximately 17,000 people.

The district consists of four K-5 elementary schools (Saint Thomas, Mountain View, Mercersburg, Montgomery), one grades 6-8 middle school (James Buchanan MS) and one grade 9-12 high school (James Buchanan High School). Tuscarora, the name of the mountain on the western boundary, was named for the Tuscarora Nation, an Iroquoian-speaking tribe. They had lived in this area for a period after migrating from the Carolinas about 1713 after disastrous warfare. They continued to migrate north to present-day New York, where about 1722 they declared their migration over. They were accepted as the sixth nation of the Iroquois League, or Haudenosaunee, the powerful confederacy of five nations that occupied much of the territory west of the Hudson River and into northern Pennsylvania.

Colonists adopted the Lenape language term for Conococheague Creek, which flows through the district on its way from the Path Valley south to the Potomac River. The local Delaware people, properly known as Lenape, named it for "clear water".

=== Mercersburg Academy ===
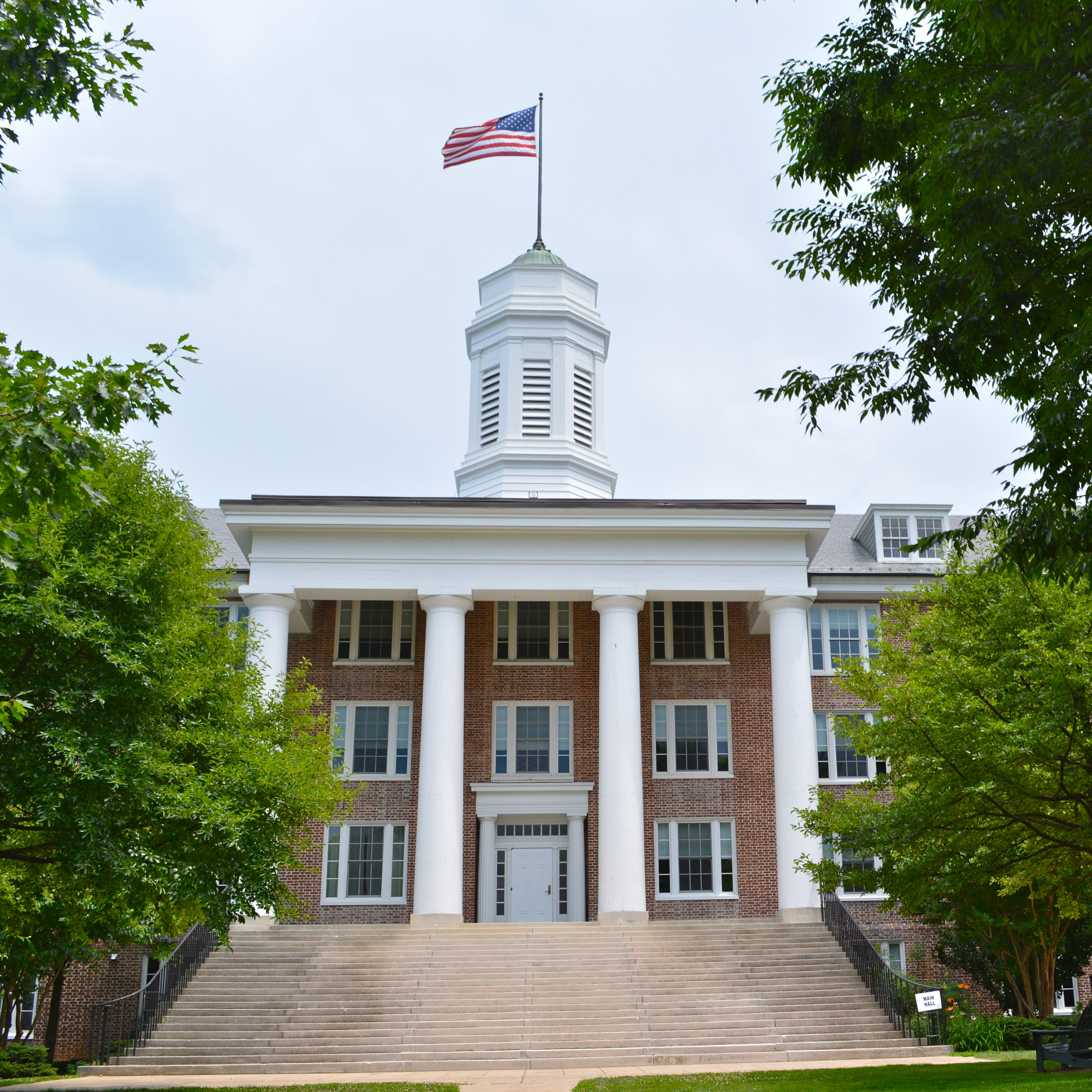
Main Hall at Mercersburg Academy

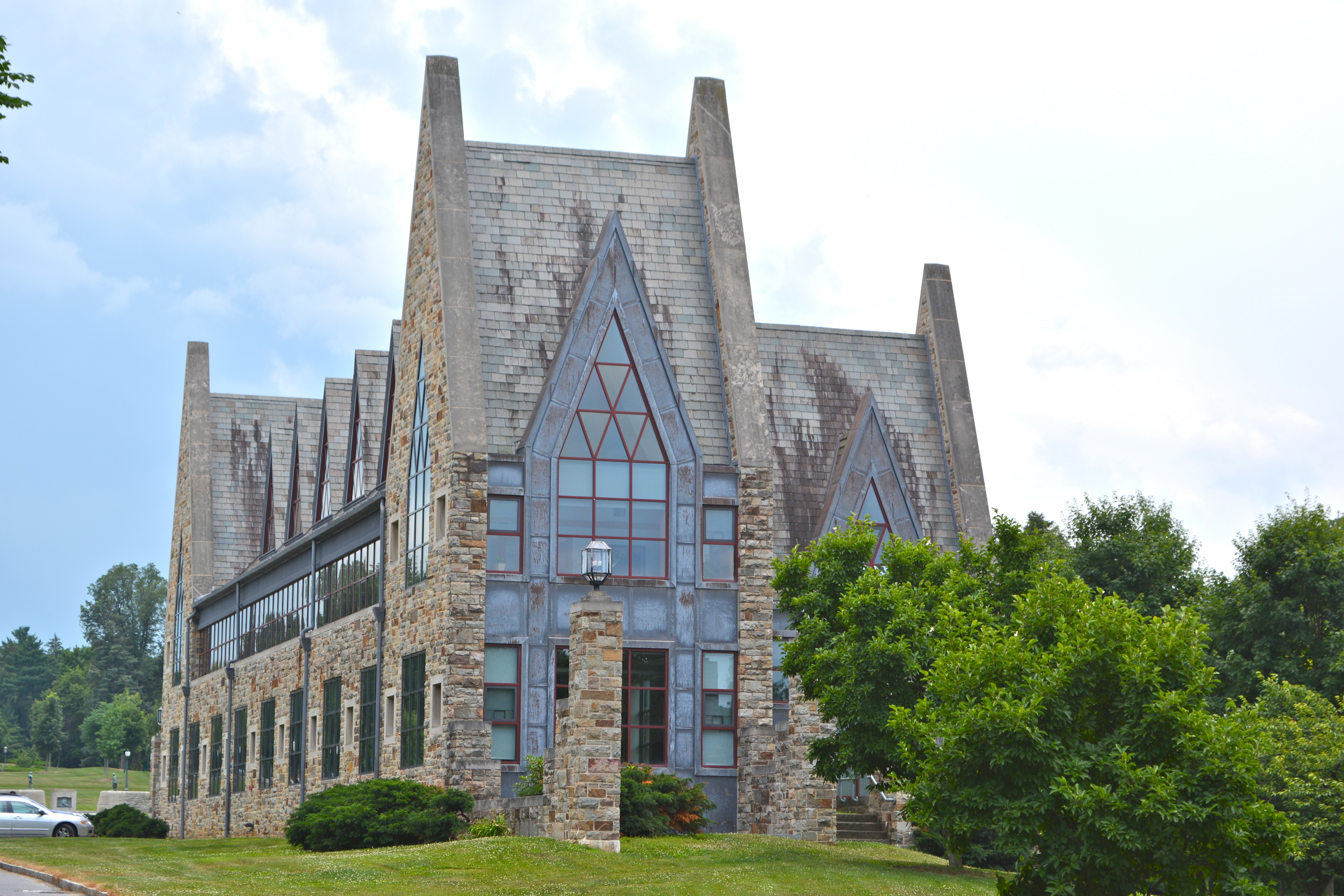
Mercersburg Academy

Mercersburg Academy is an independent college preparatory school that was founded in 1893. It has produced several Rhodes scholars, three Medal of Honor recipients, a Nobel laureate, two Academy Award winners, and 54 Olympians (including 12 gold medalists). Its campus, located east of the square in downtown Mercersburg, spans 300 acres (120 ha). It has 430 students (grades 9-12) from 26 states and 40 nations.

=== Marshall College ===
Marshall College was founded in Mercersburg in 1836. It later merged with Franklin College, in Lancaster County (today, Franklin & Marshall College ("F&M")). It is known for the Mercersburg Theology of the German Reformed Church.

== Notable people ==
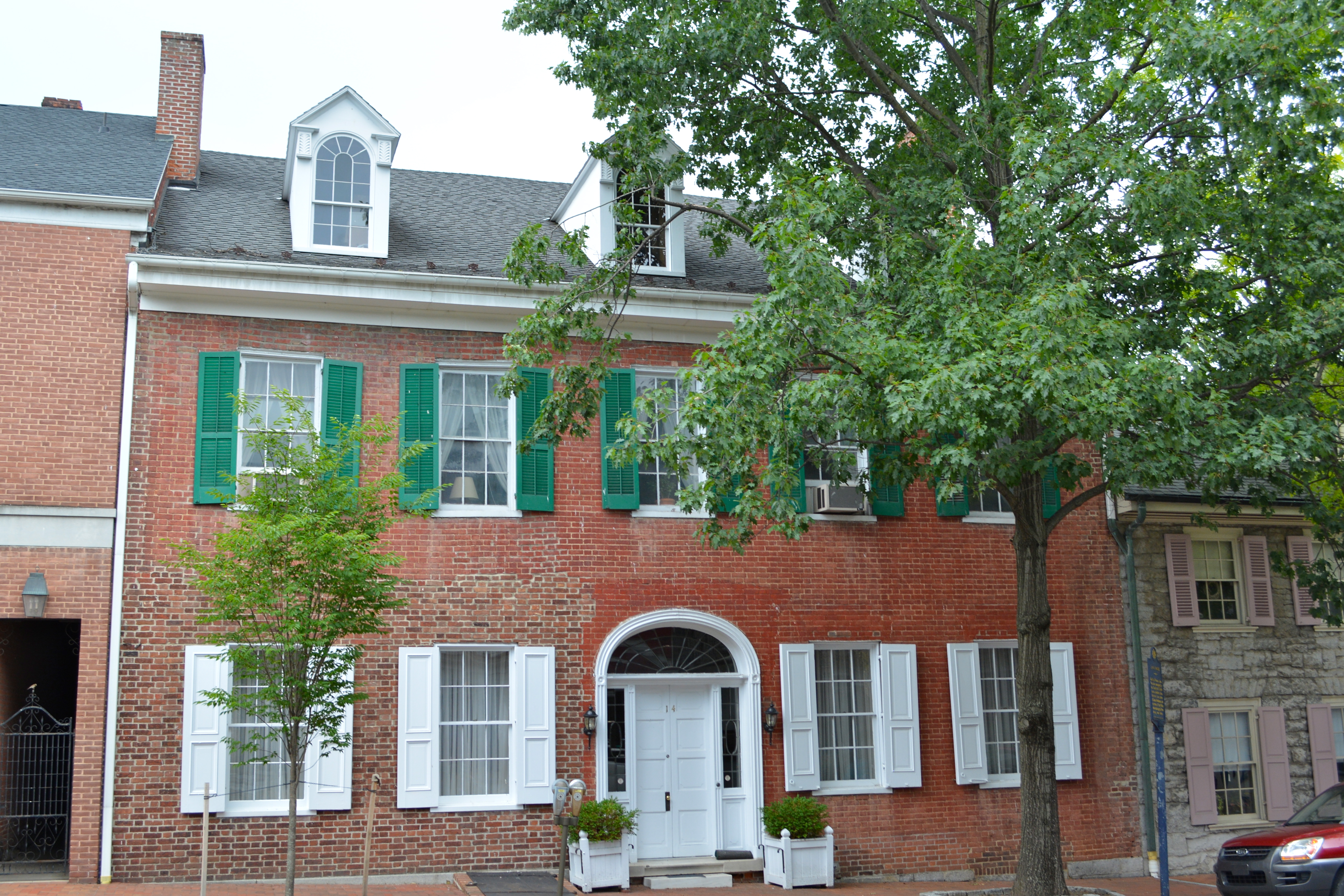
Harriet Lane House

- James Buchanan, 15th President of the United States
- Jimmy Curran, athlete and coach who trained five Olympic champions
- James Findlay, former mayor of Cincinnati and U.S. Congressman
- John Findlay, former U.S. Congressman
- William Findlay, former Pennsylvania governor and U.S. Senator
- Henry Harbaugh, Pennsylvania Dutch clergyman
- Harriet Lane, niece of James Buchanan
- James S. McCullough, former Illinois state auditor
- Thomas Bard McFarland, associate justice, Supreme Court of California
- Joseph Mitchell, Indiana Supreme Court justice, Goshen, Indiana mayor, and 2nd Indiana Cavalry Regiment captain during Civil War
- Blanche Nevin, sculptor
- John Williamson Nevin, theologian
- Benicio del Toro, actor and producer

== Gallery ==
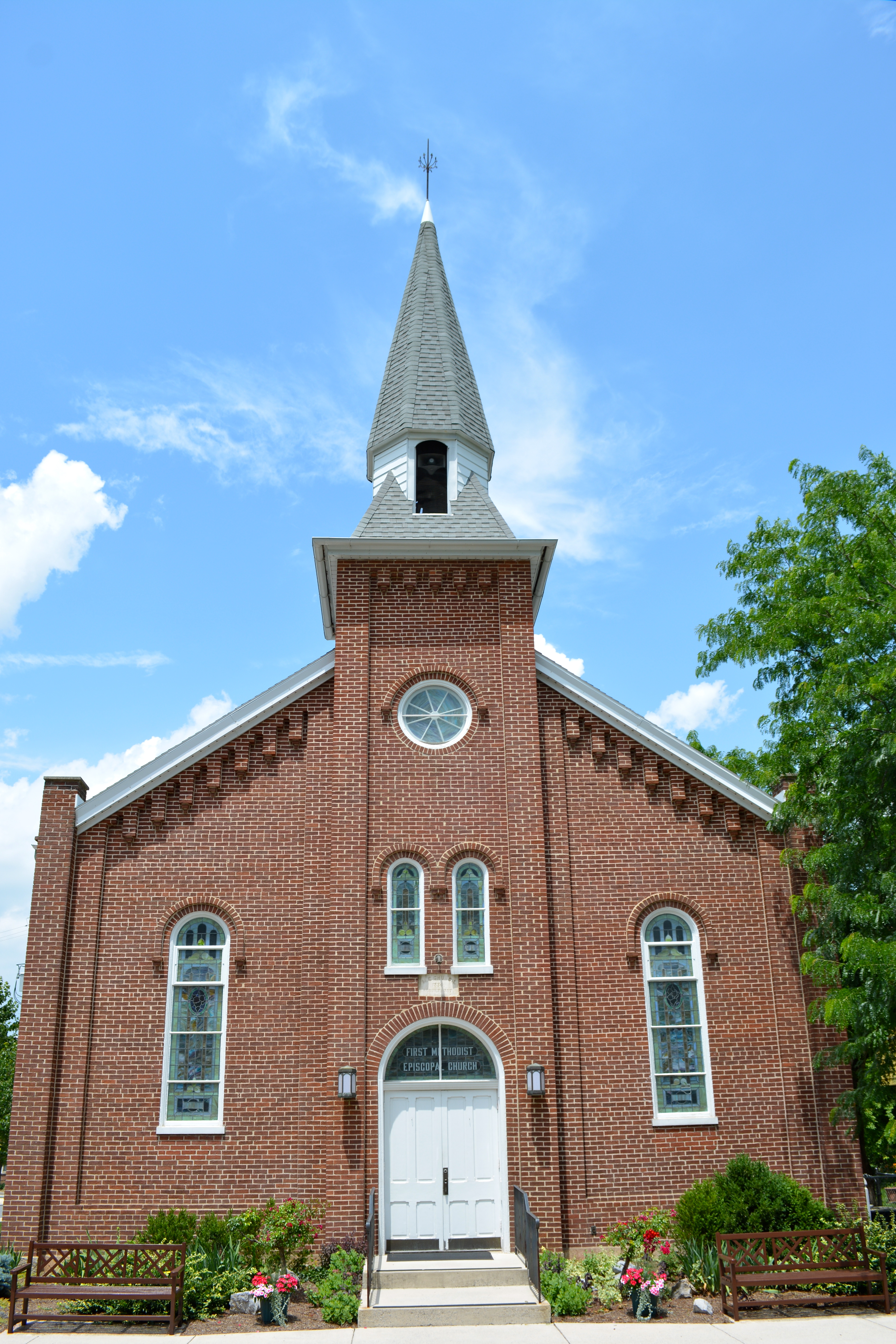
First Methodist Episcopal Church

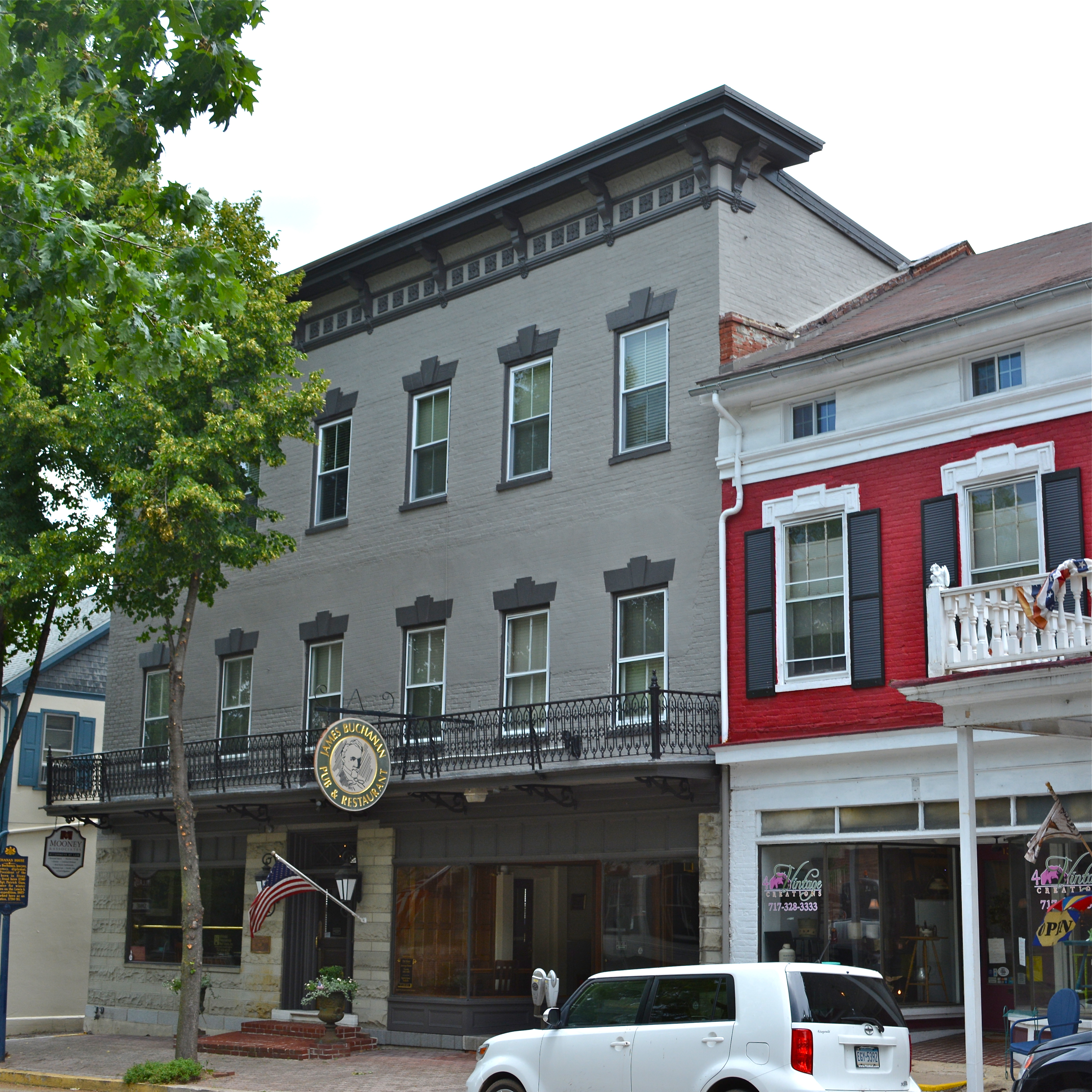
The James Buchanan Hotel

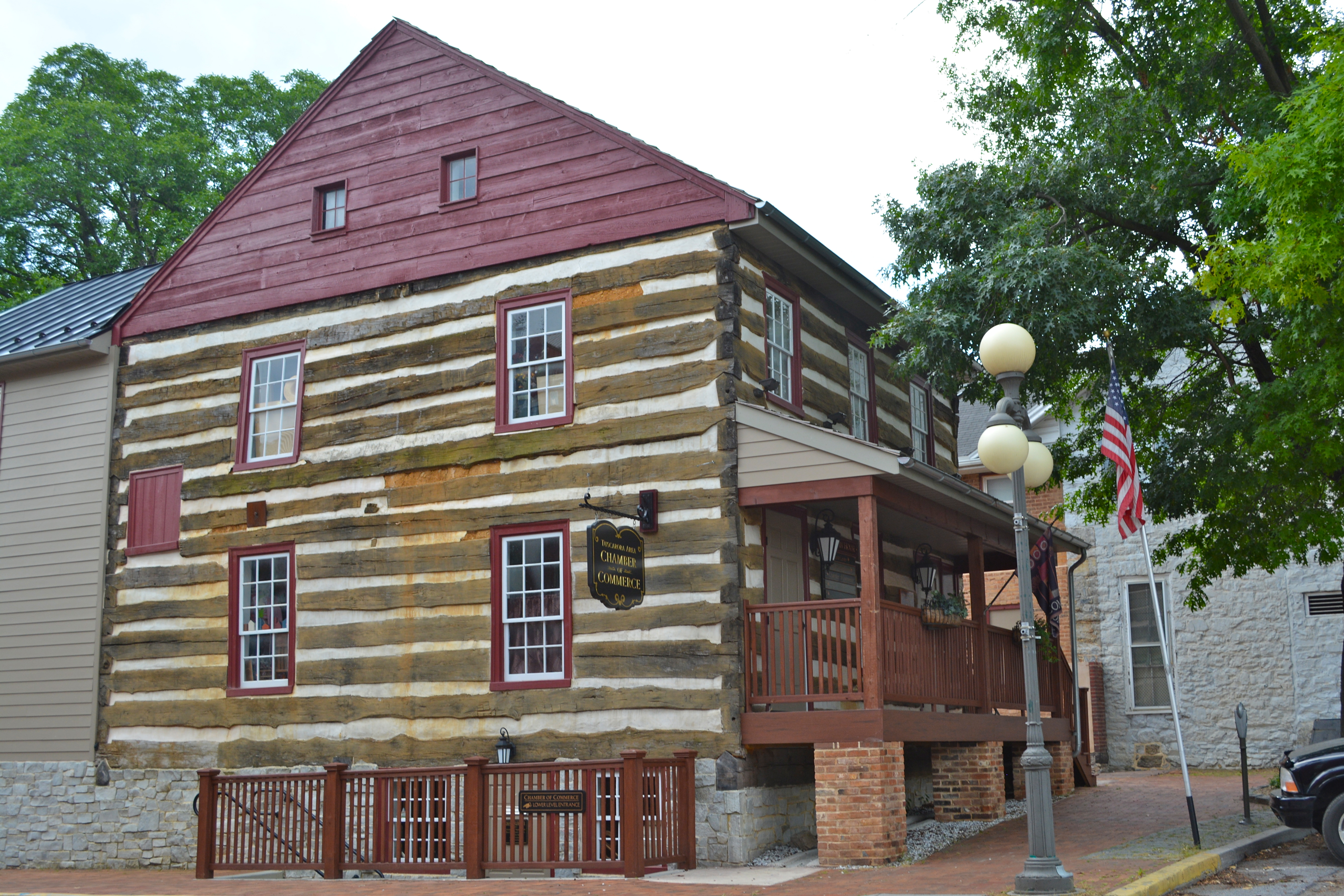
Irwin House on Main and Seminary streets

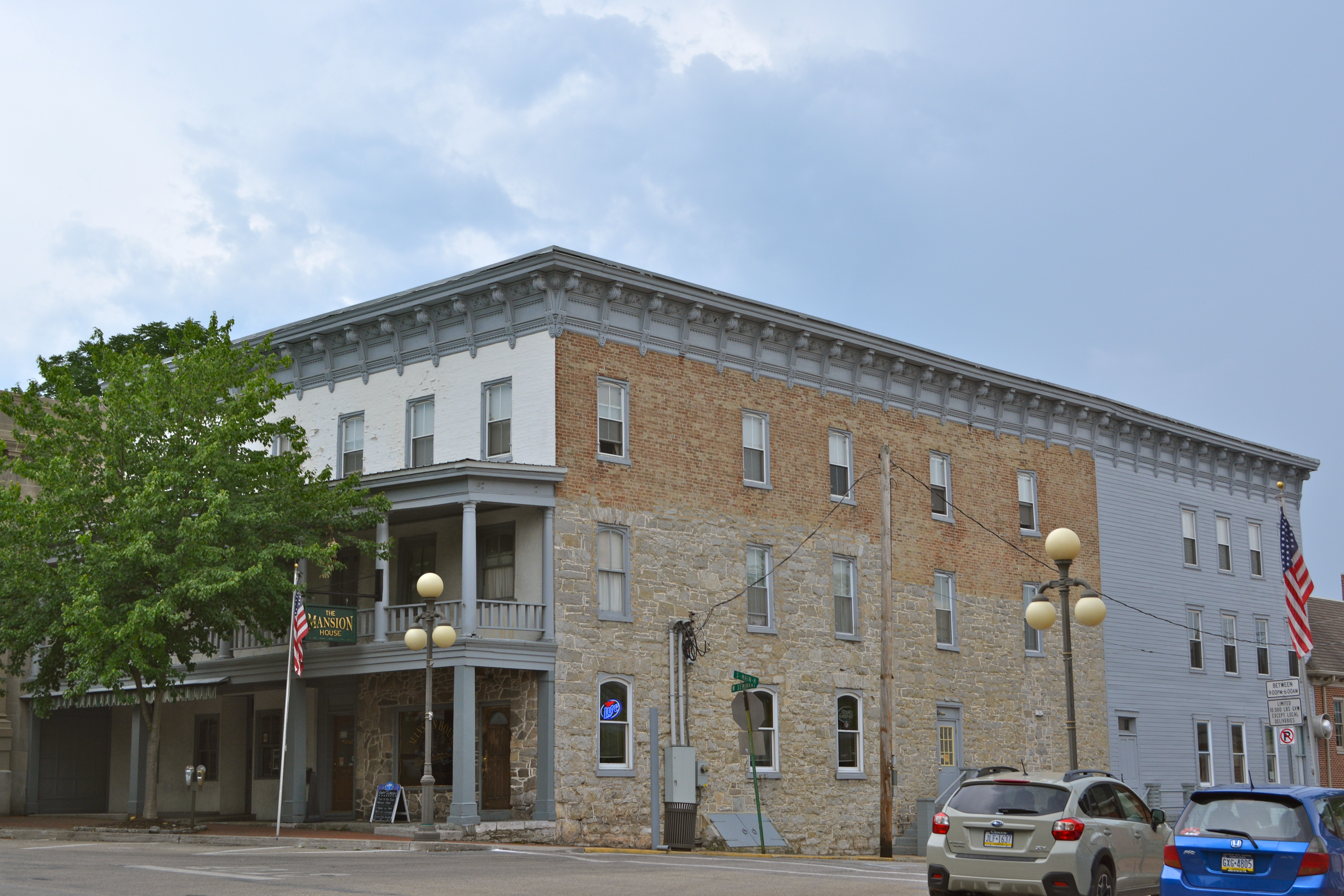
Mansion House
