= Harriet Lane =

First Lady of the United States from 1857 to 1861

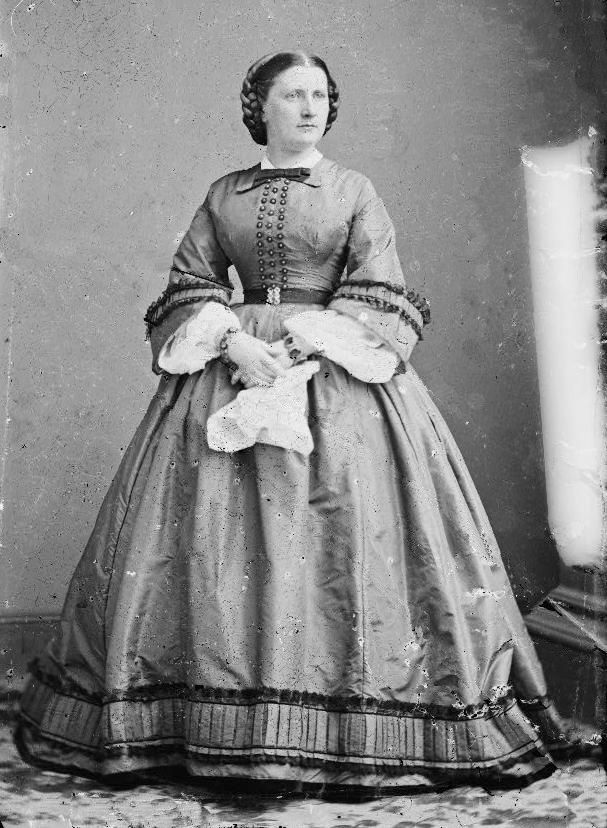
- Lane c. 1855–1865

First Lady of the United States
- In role March 4, 1857 – March 4, 1861
- President: James Buchanan
- Preceded by: Jane Pierce
- Succeeded by: Mary Todd Lincoln

Personal details
- Born: Harriet Rebecca Lane; May 9, 1830 Franklin County, Pennsylvania, U.S.
- Died: July 3, 1903 (aged 73) Narragansett, Rhode Island, U.S.
- Resting place: Green Mount Cemetery
- Spouse: Henry Johnston
- Children: 2

Harriet Rebecca Lane Johnston (née Lane; May 9, 1830 – July 3, 1903) acted as First Lady of the United States during the administration of her uncle, President James Buchanan, from 1857 to 1861. She has been described as the first of the modern first ladies, being a diplomatic hostess, whose dress-styles were copied, and who promoted deserving causes. In her will, she left funds for a new school on the grounds of Washington National Cathedral. Several ships have been named in her honor, including the cutter USCGC Harriet Lane, still in service.

== Status ==
Lane is the first person to have served as First Lady to a bachelor president, Buchanan being the only U.S. president never to have married. Rose Cleveland also served as First Lady to bachelor president Grover Cleveland until his marriage to Frances Folsom. They are among eleven women who have served as First Lady while not married to the president, with most of the other women being relatives of widowed presidents.

== Early life ==
Harriet Lane's family was from Franklin County, Pennsylvania. She was the youngest child of Elliott Tole Lane, a merchant, and Jane Ann Buchanan Lane. She lost her mother when she was nine; when her father's death two years later made her an orphan, she requested that her favorite uncle, James Buchanan, be appointed as her legal guardian. Buchanan, an unmarried Democratic senator from Pennsylvania, indulged his niece and her sister, enrolling them in boarding schools in Charles Town, Virginia (later for two years at the Georgetown Visitation Monastery in the Georgetown section of Washington, D.C.). By this time, Buchanan was Secretary of State, and, as he had promised, he introduced her to fashionable and political circles.

In 1854, she joined him in London, where he was minister to the Court of St. James's. Queen Victoria gave "dear Miss Lane" the rank of ambassador's wife; admiring suitors gave her the fame of a beauty. In appearance, "Hal" Lane was of medium height, with masses of light, almost golden-colored hair. She had eyes that were described as "violet colored".

== Acting First Lady of the United States ==
The capital welcomed its new "Democratic Queen" to the White House in 1857. Harriet was a popular hostess during the four years of the Buchanan presidency. Women copied her hair and clothing styles (especially when she lowered the neckline on her inaugural gown by 2.5 inches), parents named their daughters for her, and a popular song ("Listen to the Mockingbird") was dedicated to her. While in the White House, she used her position to promote social causes, such as improving the living conditions of Native Americans in reservations. She also made a point of inviting artists and musicians to White House functions. For both her popularity and her advocacy work, she has been described as the first of the modern first ladies, and her popularity at the time is compared to that of Jacqueline Kennedy in the 1960s. The presidential yacht was named for her—the first of several ships to be named after her, one of which remains in service.

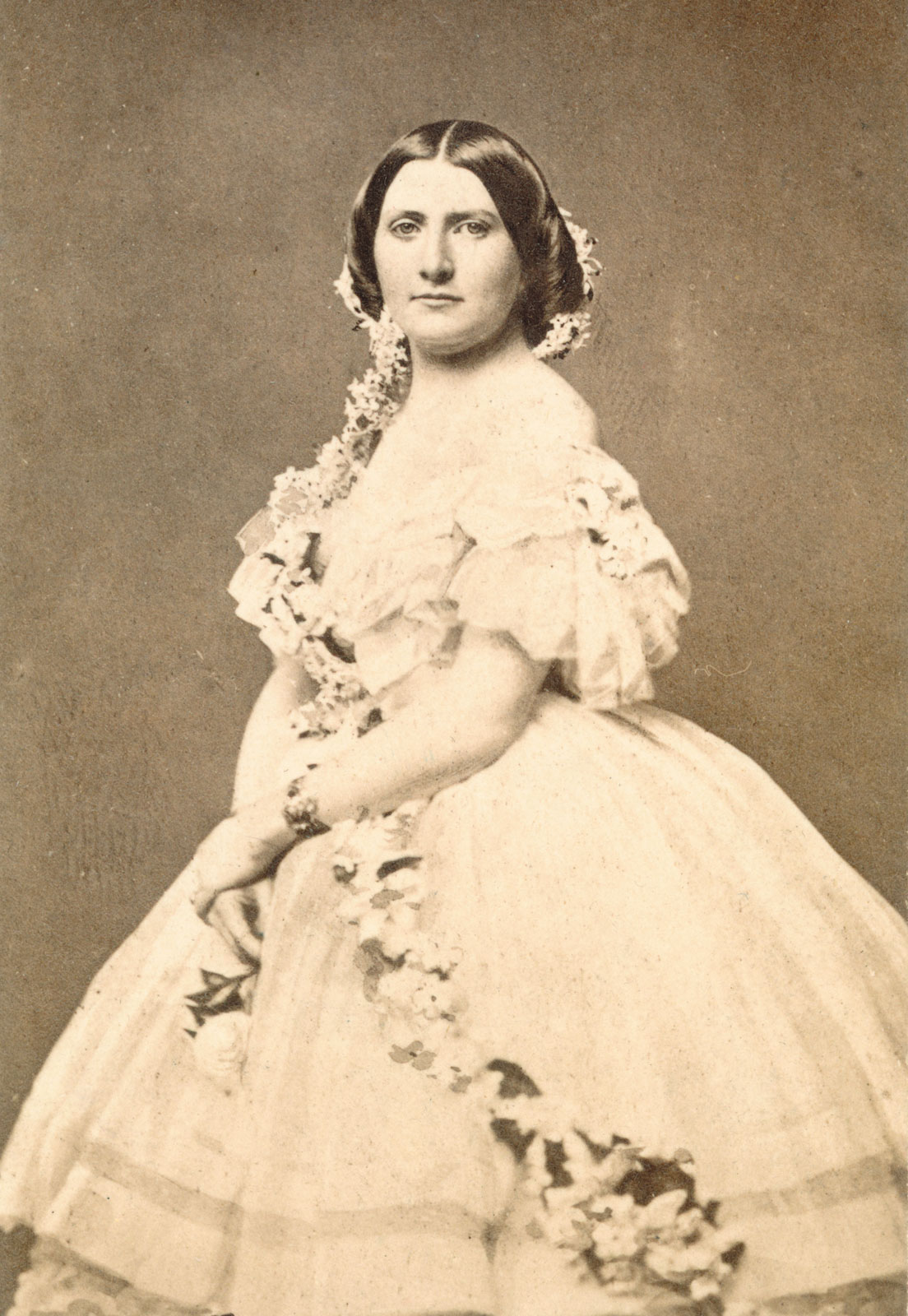
Harriet Lane

As sectional tensions increased, she worked out seating arrangements for her weekly formal dinner parties with special care, to give dignitaries their proper precedence and still keep political foes apart. Her tact did not falter, but her task became impossible—as did her uncle's. Seven states had seceded by the time Buchanan retired from office and returned with his niece to his spacious country home, Wheatland, near Lancaster, Pennsylvania.

In the 1982 Siena College Research Institute survey asking historians to assess American first ladies, Lane and several other "acting" first ladies were included. The first ladies survey, which has been conducted periodically since, ranks first ladies according to a cumulative score on the independent criteria of their background, value to the country, intelligence, courage, accomplishments, integrity, leadership, being their own women, public image, and value to the president. In the 1982 survey, out of 42 first ladies and acting first ladies, Lane was assessed as the 29th most highly regarded among historians. Acting first ladies such as Lane have been excluded from subsequent iterations of this survey.

== Romance and marriage ==
During her time in England, Sir Fitzroy Kelly, then Prime Minister Palmerston's attorney general, proposed marriage to her; Queen Victoria was strongly in favor of this match, as it would keep Lane in England.

Lane considered the advantages of a number of bachelors. Her uncle cautioned Lane against "rushing precipitately into matrimonial connections" as his ward found her potential suitors "pleasant but dreadfully troublesome". Lane eventually married Baltimore banker Henry Elliott Johnston at the age of 36. They had two sons: James Buchanan Johnston (1866–1881) and Henry Elliot Johnston (1869–1882), but within the 18 years from 1867 to 1885, her uncle, her husband, and her children all died.

== Later life and death ==
Harriet wrote her will in 1895 and lived another eight years, during which the country's general prosperity greatly increased the value of her estate. She added a codicil in 1899 directing that a school building be constructed on the grounds of the Washington National Cathedral property and asked that it be called the Lane-Johnston Building "to the end that the family names of my husband and myself may be associated with the bequest made in loving memory of our sons." A codicil of 1903 increased her gift by one third but said that only half the total was to be spent on the building. The remainder was "specially to provide for the free maintenance, education and training of choirboys, primarily those in service of the Cathedral." This bequest founded the prestigious boys' school that today is called St. Albans School, which opened in October 1909.

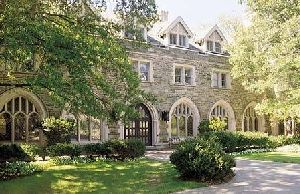
Lane-Johnston Building, St. Albans School

At Harriet Lane Johnston's funeral, services were conducted by Bishop Satterlee and Canon DeVries of the Washington National Cathedral. She was buried in Green Mount Cemetery, Baltimore, Maryland, her grave marked with a Celtic cross like the Peace Cross on the cathedral close. In 1905, guests were invited to see the cornerstone of the first St. Albans School building, laid for what the invitation referred to as "The Lane Johnston Choir School for Boys of the Washington Cathedral".

== Legacy ==
Lane left bequests in her will that established a children's hospital and a boys' school, and she donated her collection of artwork to the Smithsonian. Several Navy and Coast Guard ships have been named in her honor.

Her birthplace, the Lane House, was listed on the National Register of Historic Places in 1972.

=== Hospital and school ===
She dedicated $400,000 (equivalent to $14,300,000 in 2025) to establish the Harriet Lane Home for Invalid Children at the Johns Hopkins Hospital in Baltimore, Maryland as a memorial to two sons who had died in childhood. In October 1912 the Harriet Lane Home officially opened. It was the first children's clinic in the United States that was associated with a medical school. Eventually treating over 60,000 children a year, the Harriet Lane Home became a pioneer treatment, teaching, and research clinic.

From 1930 to 1963, Helen Taussig, who helped to develop the blue baby operation, headed the pediatric cardiac clinic. Child psychiatrist Leo Kanner did studies of autistic children. Lawson Wilkins established an endocrine clinic that developed procedures used universally to treat children with certain glandular disorders, including dwarfism. John E. Bordley and William G. Hardy broke ground in detecting hearing impairments in very young children. It became a renowned pediatric facility; the Harriet Lane Outpatient Clinics serve thousands of children today, and the widely used manual for pediatric house officers, The Harriet Lane Handbook, bears her name.

The Harriet Lane Outpatient Clinics continue to operate in countries throughout the world.

The pediatric medicine Harriet Lane Handbook series continues in print and online, with multiple titles. The original title (subtitled A Manual for Pediatric House Officers) is in its 22nd edition, published by Mosby.

=== Art collection ===
She had an art collection based on European works, which she left to the U.S. government. The Smithsonian Institution called her the "First Lady of the National Collection of Fine Arts" after her collection was accepted into public ownership.

=== Namesake ships ===
The United States Coast Guard has had three cutters named in her honor. The first was the USRC Harriet Lane, commissioned into the United States Revenue Cutter Service (predecessor of the USCG) in 1857. This cutter was transferred to the United States Navy in 1861 because of the American Civil War. (Note: Lieutenant W. D. Thompson fired the first naval shot of the Civil War from the USRC Harriet Lane. The ship was captured by the Confederate Navy in 1863, and recaptured by the U.S. Navy, but was declared to be in too poor a shape to be of any further use to the Navy. She was sold to a private party.)

The second cutter named for Harriet Lane was the 125 foot USCGC Harriet Lane (WSC-141), commissioned in 1926 and decommissioned in 1946.

The third cutter named for Harriet Lane is the USCGC Harriet Lane (WMEC-903). The cutter was commissioned in May 1984, and as of 2021, is still in active service.

== Footnotes ==
Honorary titles
Preceded by Jane Pierce	First Lady of the United States; Acting; 1857–1861	Succeeded by Mary Todd Lincoln
