= James Buchanan =

President of the United States from 1857 to 1861

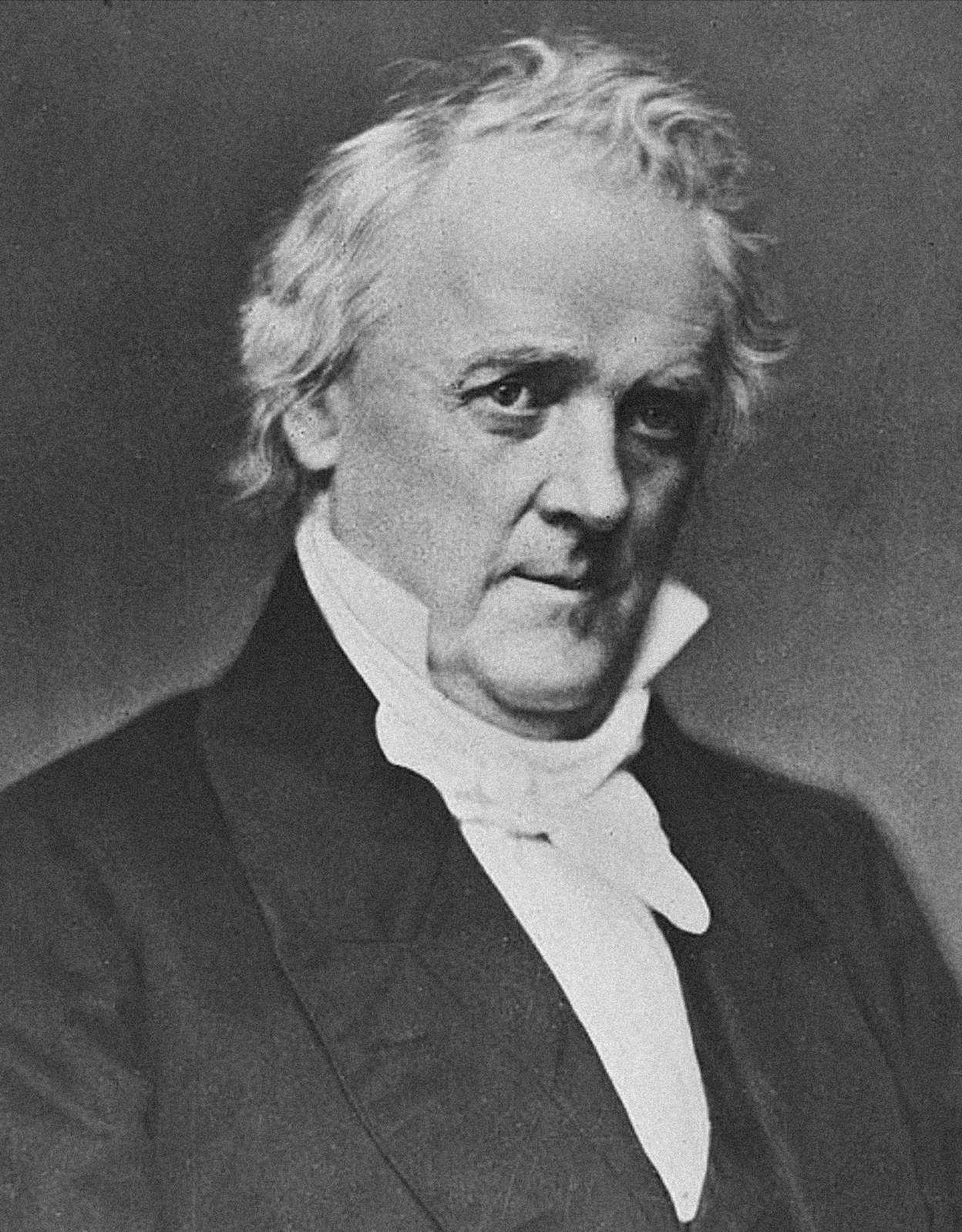
- Daguerreotype, c. 1850–1868

15th President of the United States
- In office March 4, 1857 – March 4, 1861
- Vice President: John C. Breckinridge
- Preceded by: Franklin Pierce
- Succeeded by: Abraham Lincoln

17th United States Secretary of State
- In office March 10, 1845 – March 7, 1849
- President: James K. Polk; Zachary Taylor
- Preceded by: John C. Calhoun
- Succeeded by: John M. Clayton

United States Senator from Pennsylvania
- In office December 6, 1834 – March 5, 1845
- Preceded by: William Wilkins
- Succeeded by: Simon Cameron

Member of the U.S. House of Representatives from Pennsylvania
- In office March 4, 1821 – March 3, 1831
- Preceded by: Jacob Hibshman
- Succeeded by: William Hiester
- Constituency: 3rd district (1821–1823); 4th district (1823–1831)
Committee positions
Chair of the Senate Foreign Relations Committee
In office December 5, 1836 – March 3, 1841
Preceded by	Henry Clay
Succeeded by	William Cabell Rives
Chair of the House Judiciary Committee
In office March 5, 1829 – March 3, 1831
Preceded by	Philip P. Barbour
Succeeded by	Warren R. Davis

United States Minister to the United Kingdom
- In office August 23, 1853 – March 15, 1856
- President: Franklin Pierce
- Preceded by: Joseph Reed Ingersoll
- Succeeded by: George M. Dallas

United States Minister to Russia
- In office June 11, 1832 – August 5, 1833
- President: Andrew Jackson
- Preceded by: John Randolph
- Succeeded by: William Wilkins

Member of the Pennsylvania House of Representatives from Lancaster County
- In office December 6, 1814 – December 2, 1816
- Preceded by: Emanuel Reigart, Joel Lightner, Jacob Grosh, John Graff, Henry Hambright, Robert Maxwell
- Succeeded by: Joel Lightner, Hugh Martin, John Forrey, Henry Hambright, Jasper Slaymaker, Jacob Grosh

Personal details
- Born: April 23, 1791 Cove Gap, Pennsylvania, U.S.
- Died: June 1, 1868 (aged 77) Lancaster Township, Lancaster County, Pennsylvania, U.S.
- Resting place: Woodward Hill Cemetery
- Party: Federalist (1814–1824); Democratic-Republican (1824–1828); Democratic (from 1828)
- Relatives: Harriet Lane (niece)
- Education: Dickinson College (BA)
- Occupation: Politician; lawyer

Military service
- Allegiance: United States
- Branch/service: Pennsylvania Militia
- Years of service: 1812–1814
- Rank: Private
- Unit: Shippen's Cavalry, 1st Brigade, 4th Division
- Battles/wars: War of 1812; Battle of Baltimore

Pennsylvania Historical Marker
- Official name: James Buchanan
- Type: Roadside
- Designated: January 1955

James Buchanan Jr. (Note: Pronounced /bjuːˈkænən/ bew-KAN-ən) (April 23, 1791 – June 1, 1868) was the 15th president of the United States, serving from 1857 to 1861. A Democrat from Pennsylvania, he upheld a pro-slavery interpretation of the U.S. Constitution that did little to reverse the sectional crisis between the North and South. In his final months in office, seven Southern states seceded, forming the Confederacy. On April 12, 1861, Confederate forces attacked Fort Sumter, starting the American Civil War.

During his time as a member of the Federalist Party, Buchanan was elected to the Pennsylvania House of Representatives. He won five terms in the U.S. House of Representatives, aligning with the Democratic Party of Andrew Jackson. Buchanan was appointed Minister to Russia by President Jackson in 1832 and became a U.S. senator in 1834. Serving in the Senate until 1845, he became the 17th U.S. secretary of state under President James K. Polk, and served as Minister to the United Kingdom under President Franklin Pierce from 1853 to 1856.

Beginning in 1844, Buchanan became a regular contender for the Democratic Party's presidential nomination. He was nominated and won the 1856 presidential election. Before taking office as president, Buchanan intervened with the Supreme Court case of Dred Scott v. Sandford to secure its pro-slavery ruling, and this verdict was released two days after his inauguration. He supported efforts to admit the Kansas Territory into the Union as a slave state under the Lecompton Constitution. Buchanan honored his pledge to serve only one term and supported his vice president John C. Breckinridge's unsuccessful candidacy in the 1860 presidential election. He did not reconcile the fractured Democratic Party amid divisions involving Stephen A. Douglas, contributing to the election of Republican and former congressman Abraham Lincoln.

Buchanan's leadership during his lame duck period, before the American Civil War, has been widely criticized. He faced criticism from both the North and South during the secession crisis. Buchanan supported the Corwin Amendment in an effort to reconcile the country. He made an unsuccessful attempt to reinforce Fort Sumter, but otherwise took limited action to prepare the military. His failure to forestall the Civil War has been widely criticized, and he spent his last years defending his reputation. Historians and scholars rank him among the worst presidents in American history.

== Early life ==
=== Childhood and education ===
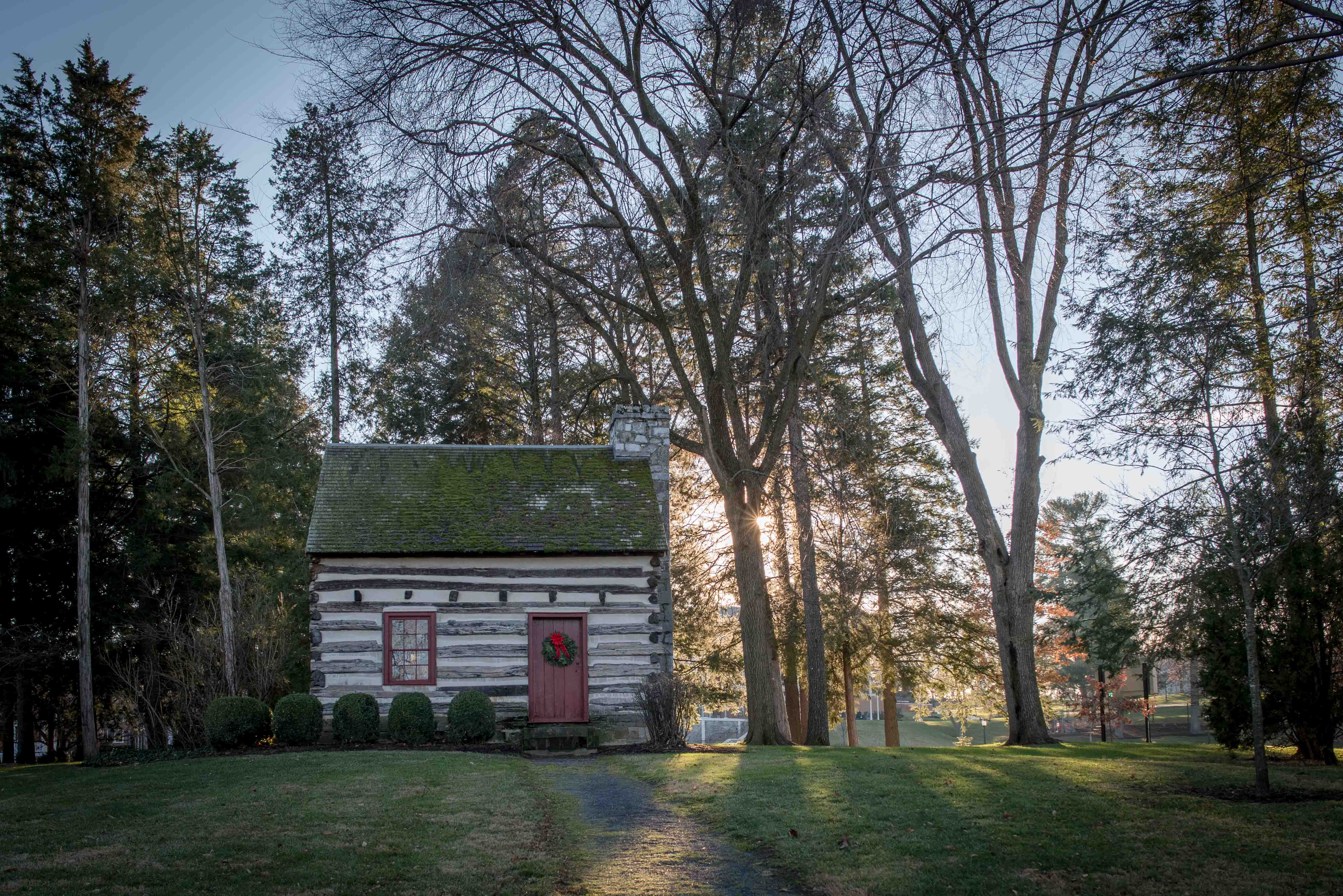
Buchanan's birthplace

James Buchanan Jr. was born into a Scotch-Irish family on April 23, 1791, in a log cabin at the Stony Batter farm, near Cove Gap in the Allegheny Mountains of southern Pennsylvania. He was the second of eleven children, with six sisters and four brothers, and was the eldest son of James Buchanan Sr. and Elizabeth Speer. James Buchanan Sr. was an Ulster-Scot from just outside Ramelton, a small town in County Donegal, Ireland, who immigrated to the newly formed United States in 1783. Shortly after Buchanan's birth, the family relocated to a farm near Mercersburg, Pennsylvania, and later settled in the town in 1794. His father became the area's wealthiest resident, working as a merchant, farmer, and real estate investor. Buchanan attributed his early education primarily to his mother, whereas his father had a greater influence on his character. His mother discussed politics with him as a child and had an interest in poetry, often quoting John Milton and William Shakespeare.

Buchanan attended the Old Stone Academy in Mercersburg and then Dickinson College in Carlisle, Pennsylvania. In 1808, he was nearly expelled for disorderly conduct. He and other students attracted attention for drinking in local taverns, disturbing the peace at night, and committing acts of vandalism, but he pleaded for a second chance and ultimately graduated with honors in 1809. Later that year, Buchanan moved to the state capital at Lancaster, to train as a lawyer for two and a half years with James Hopkins. He studied the United States Code and the Constitution of the United States as well as legal authorities such as William Blackstone during his education.

=== Early law practice and Pennsylvania House of Representatives ===
In 1812, Buchanan passed the bar exam and remained in Lancaster when Harrisburg became the new capital of Pennsylvania. He established a successful legal practice in the city. His income increased after he established his practice, and by 1821 he was earning more than $11,000 per year (equivalent to $270,000 in 2025). Buchanan became a Freemason and served as Worshipful Master of Masonic Lodge No. 43 in Lancaster and as a District Deputy Grand Master of the Grand Lodge of Pennsylvania.

He also served as chairman of the Lancaster chapter of the Federalist Party. Like his father, Buchanan supported the party's program, which provided federal funds for building projects and import duties as well as the re-establishment of a central bank after the First Bank of the United States' license expired in 1811. He became a strong critic of Democratic-Republican President James Madison during the War of 1812. Although he did not serve in a militia during the War of 1812, he joined a group of young men who seized horses for the United States Army in the Baltimore area during the British occupation. Buchanan was the last president involved in the War of 1812.

In 1814, he was elected as a Federalist to the Pennsylvania House of Representatives and became its youngest member. He held this seat until 1816. Since sessions in the Pennsylvania General Assembly lasted only three months, Buchanan continued practicing law, and his service helped him acquire more clients. In 1815, he defended District Judge Walter Franklin in an impeachment trial before the Pennsylvania Senate, over alleged judicial misconduct. Buchanan persuaded the senators that only judicial crimes and clear violations of the law justified impeachment.

== Congressional career ==
=== U.S. House of Representatives ===
In the congressional elections of 1820, Buchanan ran for a seat in the House of Representatives. Shortly after his election victory, his father died in a carriage accident. As a young Representative, Buchanan was one of the most prominent leaders of Pennsylvania's "Amalgamator party", which included both Democratic-Republicans and former Federalists. Buchanan's Federalist convictions declined, and he switched parties after opposing a nativist Federalist bill. During the 1824 presidential election, Buchanan initially supported Henry Clay but switched to Andrew Jackson when it became clear that the Pennsylvanian public preferred Jackson. After Jackson lost the 1824 election, he joined his faction.

In Washington, Buchanan became a defender of states' rights, and was close with many southern Congressmen. Buchanan maintained strong ties to his constituency and helped build a Democratic coalition in Pennsylvania. In the 1828 presidential election, he supported Andrew Jackson and helped secure Pennsylvania.

Buchanan gained attention during an impeachment trial in which he prosecuted federal district judge James H. Peck, whom the Senate acquitted. He was appointed to a House committee on agriculture in his first year and later became chairman of the Judiciary Committee. In 1831, Buchanan declined a nomination for the 22nd United States Congress. He still had political ambitions and some Pennsylvania Democrats put him forward as a candidate for the vice presidency in the 1832 election.

=== Minister to Russia ===
In 1832, President Jackson offered Buchanan the position of United States Ambassador to Russia. Buchanan was reluctant to leave the country, viewing Saint Petersburg as a political exile, but ultimately agreed. His work focused on concluding a trade and shipping treaty with Russia. While Buchanan was successful with the trade treaty, negotiating an agreement on free merchant shipping with Foreign Minister Karl Nesselrode proved difficult. He had denounced Tsar Nicholas I of Russia as a despot the previous year during his tenure in Congress. Many Americans had reacted negatively to Russia's response to the 1830 Polish uprising.

=== U.S. Senator ===
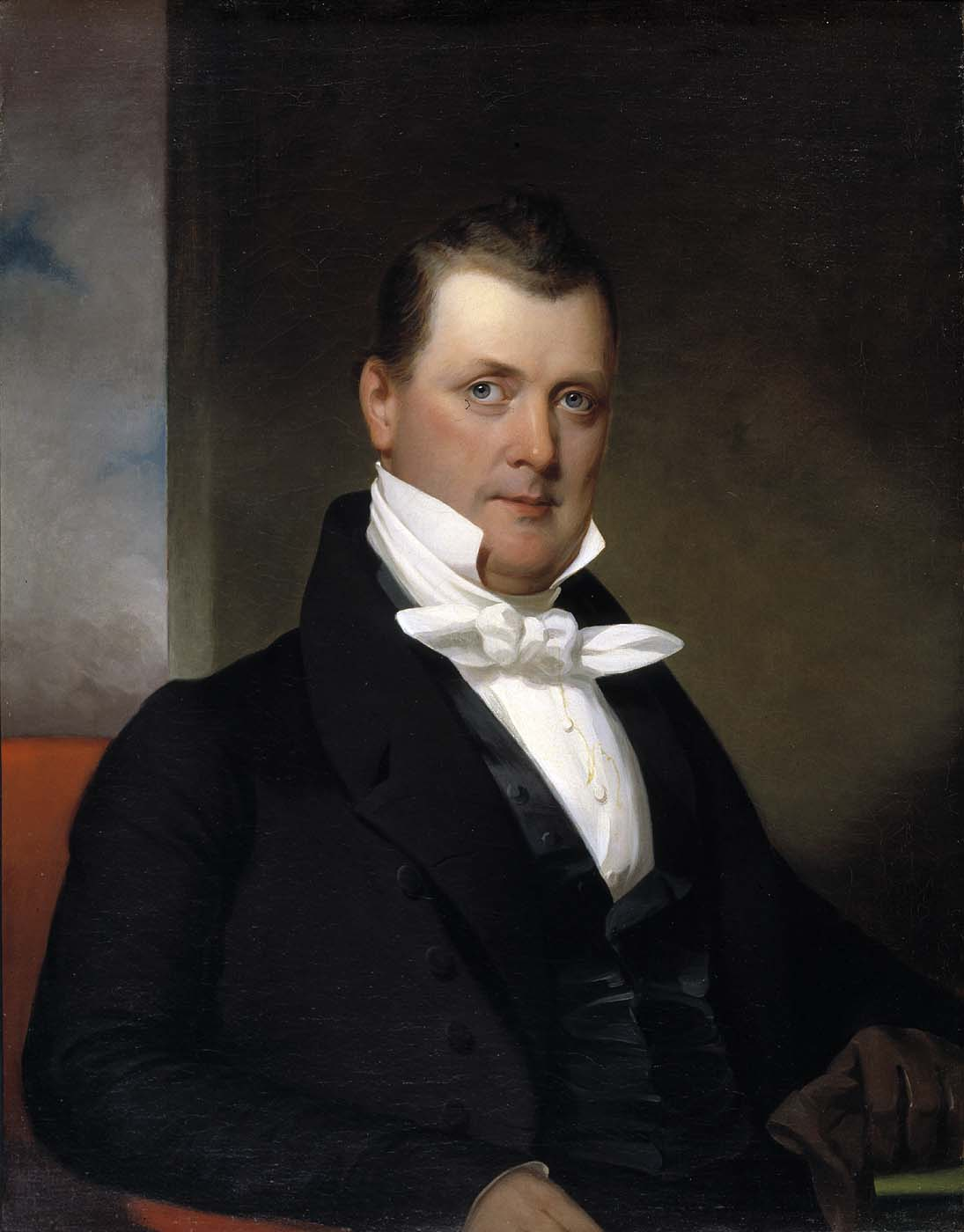
1834 portrait of Buchanan at age 42–43 by Jacob Eichholtz

Buchanan returned home and lost an election for a full Senate term, but was appointed by the Pennsylvania state legislature to succeed William Wilkins in the U.S. Senate. Wilkins, in turn, replaced Buchanan as the ambassador to Russia. Buchanan, who was re-elected in 1836 and 1842, opposed the re-chartering of the Second Bank of the United States and supported efforts to expunge a congressional censure of Jackson stemming from the Bank War. Buchanan served in the Senate until March 1845 and was twice re-elected. To unite Pennsylvania Democrats, he was chosen as their candidate for the Democratic National Convention. Buchanan followed the Pennsylvania State Legislature's guidelines and sometimes voted against positions he promoted in his own speeches, despite ambitions for the White House.

Buchanan was known for his commitment to states' rights and manifest destiny. He rejected President Martin Van Buren's offer to become United States Attorney General and chaired Senate committees such as the Committee on Foreign Relations. Buchanan was one of only a few senators to vote against the Webster–Ashburton Treaty and demanded the entire Aroostook River Valley for the United States. In the Oregon Boundary Dispute, Buchanan adopted the maximum demand of 54°40′ as the northern border and spoke out in favor of annexing the Republic of Texas. During the 1838 Pennsylvania gubernatorial election, he supported the Democratic candidate David Rittenhouse Porter, who was elected governor.

Buchanan also opposed a gag rule sponsored by John C. Calhoun that would have suppressed anti-slavery petitions. He joined the majority in blocking the rule. Buchanan said, "We have just as little right to interfere with slavery in the South, as we have to touch the right of petition." He believed that the issue of slavery was the domain of the states and criticized abolitionists over the issue. In the lead-up to the 1844 Democratic National Convention, Buchanan positioned himself as a potential alternative to former president Martin Van Buren, but the nomination went to James K. Polk, who won the election.

== Diplomatic career ==
=== Secretary of State ===
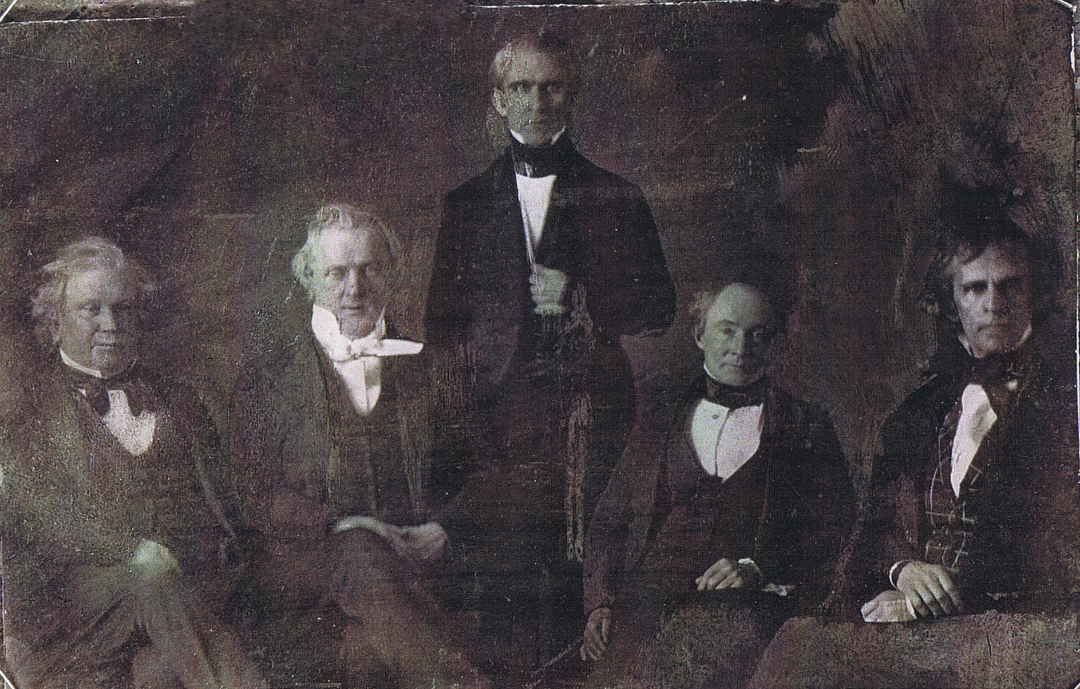
Buchanan (second from the left) in Polk's cabinet, 1849

Buchanan was offered the position of Secretary of State in the Polk administration or a seat on the Supreme Court in recognition of his support in the election campaign. He accepted the State Department post and served for the duration of Polk's single term in office. During his tenure, the United States recorded its largest territorial expansion through the Oregon Treaty and the Treaty of Guadalupe Hidalgo. In negotiations with Britain over Oregon, Buchanan initially favored the 49th parallel as the boundary of Oregon Territory, while Polk called for a more northerly boundary line. He later adopted a more expansionist position aligned with Fifty-Four Forty or Fight, before ultimately supporting the Oregon Compromise of 1846, which established the 49th parallel as the boundary in the Pacific Northwest.

Buchanan believed that Mexico's April 1846 attack on American troops on the other side of the Rio Grande constituted a border violation and a legitimate reason for war. During the Mexican–American War, he initially advised against claiming territory south of the Rio Grande, fearing war with Britain and France. As the war came to an end, Buchanan changed his position and argued for the annexation of further territory, stating that Mexico was responsible for the war and that the compensation was too low. Buchanan sought the nomination at the 1848 Democratic National Convention, as Polk had promised to serve only one term. He won the support of only the Pennsylvania and Virginia delegations, and Senator Lewis Cass of Michigan was nominated.

=== Civilian life and 1852 presidential election ===
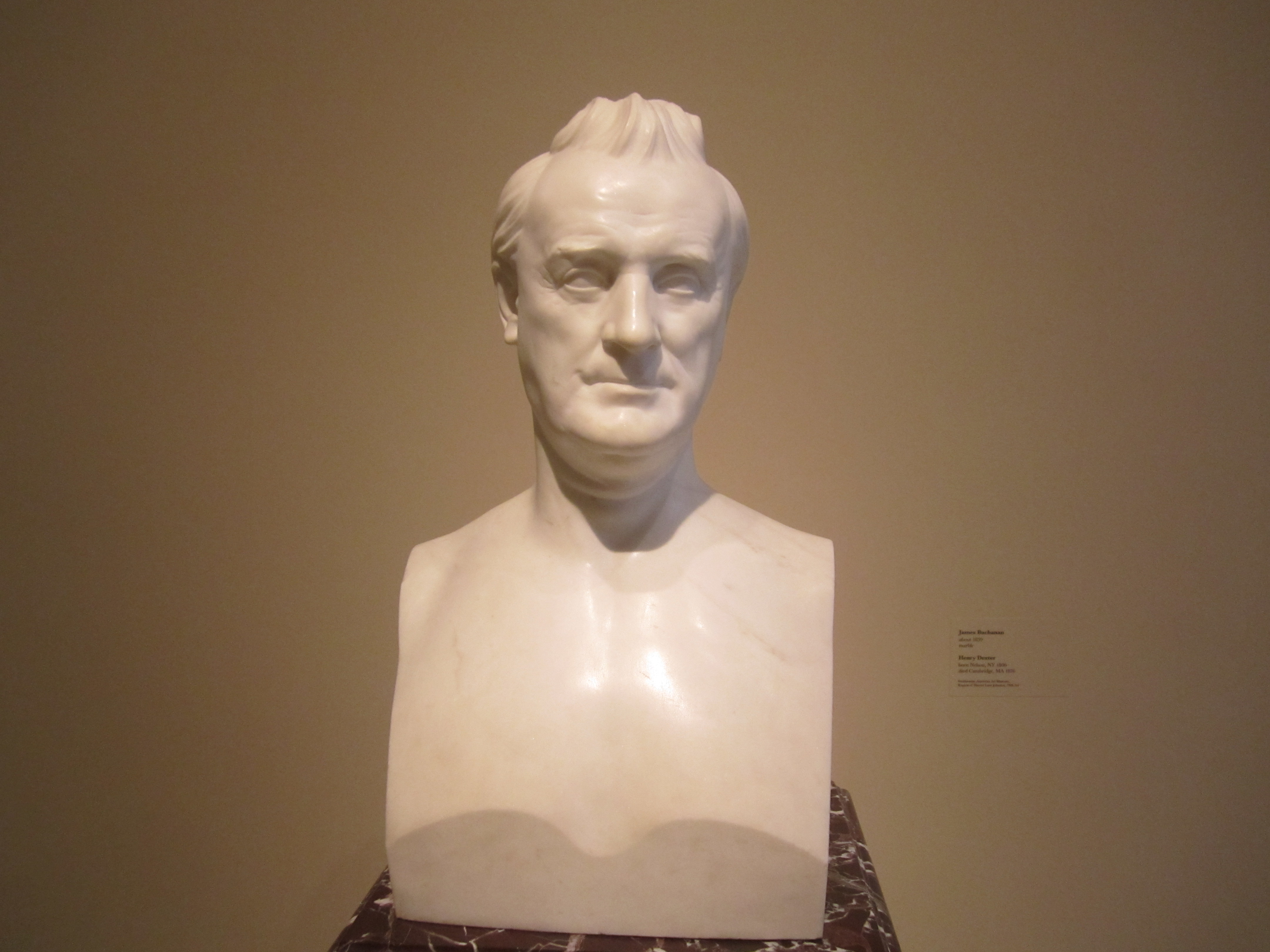
Bust of James Buchanan by Henry Dexter at the National Portrait Gallery

With the 1848 election of Whig Zachary Taylor, Buchanan returned to private life. Buchanan was getting older and still dressed in the old-fashioned style of his adolescence, earning him the nickname "Old Public Functionary" from the press. Slavery opponents in the North mocked him as a relic of prehistoric man because of his moral values. He bought Wheatland on the outskirts of Lancaster and entertained various visitors while monitoring political events. During this period, Buchanan became the center of a family network consisting of 22 nieces, nephews and their descendants, seven of whom were orphans. He found public service jobs for some through patronage, and for those in his favor, took on the role of surrogate father. Buchanan formed the strongest emotional bond with his niece Harriet Lane, who later became First Lady for him in the White House.

In 1852, he was named president of the board of trustees of Franklin and Marshall College in Lancaster, and served in this capacity until 1866. Buchanan did not completely leave politics. He intended to publish a collection of speeches and an autobiography, but his political comeback was thwarted by the 1852 presidential election. Buchanan traveled to Washington to discuss Pennsylvania Democratic Party politics, which were divided into two camps led by Simon Cameron and George M. Dallas. He quietly campaigned for the 1852 Democratic presidential nomination. In light of the Compromise of 1850, which had led to the admission of California into the Union as a free state and the Fugitive Slave Act of 1850, Buchanan now rejected the Missouri Compromise and welcomed Congress' rejection of the Wilmot Proviso, which prohibited slavery in all territories gained in the Mexican–American War. Buchanan criticized abolitionism as a fanatical attitude and believed that slavery should be decided by state legislatures, not Congress. He disliked abolitionist Northerners due to his party affiliation, and became known as a doughface due to his sympathy toward the South. Buchanan emerged as a promising candidate for the Democratic presidential nomination, alongside Lewis Cass, Stephen A. Douglas, and William L. Marcy. However, the Pennsylvania convention did not vote unanimously in his favor, with over 30 delegates protesting against him. At the 1852 Democratic National Convention, he won the support of many southern delegates but failed to win the two-thirds support needed for the presidential nomination, which went to Franklin Pierce. Buchanan declined to serve as the vice presidential nominee, and the convention instead nominated his close friend, William R. King.

=== Minister to the United Kingdom ===
Pierce won the election in November 1852, and six months later, Buchanan accepted the position of United States Minister to the United Kingdom, a position that represented a step backward in his career and that he had twice previously rejected. Buchanan sailed for England in mid-1853, and he remained abroad for the next three years. In 1850, the United States and the United Kingdom signed the Clayton–Bulwer Treaty, which committed both countries to joint control of any future canal that would connect the Atlantic and Pacific Oceans through Central America. Buchanan met repeatedly with Lord Clarendon, the British foreign minister, in hopes of pressuring the British to withdraw from Central America. He was able to reduce British influence in Honduras and Nicaragua while also raising the kingdom's awareness of American interests in the region. He also focused on the potential annexation of Cuba, which had long interested him.

At Pierce's prompting, Buchanan met in Ostend, Belgium, with U.S. Ambassador to Spain Pierre Soulé and U.S. Ambassador to France John Mason, to work out a plan for the acquisition of Cuba. The resulting document, known as the Ostend Manifesto, proposed the purchase of Cuba from Spain and declared the island "as necessary to the North American republic as any of its present members". Against Buchanan's recommendation, the final draft of the manifesto suggested that "wresting it from Spain", if Spain refused to sell, would be justified "by every law, human and Divine". The manifesto was met with a divided response and was never acted upon. It weakened the Pierce administration and reduced support for manifest destiny. In 1855, as Buchanan's desire to return home grew, Pierce asked him to hold the fort in London in light of the relocation of a British fleet to the Caribbean.

== Election of 1856 ==
1856 map of electoral votes

Buchanan's service abroad allowed him to avoid the debate over the Kansas–Nebraska Act then roiling the country in the slavery dispute. While he did not overtly seek the presidency, he assented to the movement on his behalf. While still in England, he campaigned by praising John Joseph Hughes, who was Archbishop of New York, to a Catholic archbishop. The latter campaigned for Buchanan among high-ranking Catholics as soon as he heard about it. When Buchanan arrived home at the end of April 1856, he led on the first ballot, supported by powerful Senators John Slidell, Jesse Bright, and Thomas F. Bayard, who presented Buchanan as an experienced leader appealing to the North and South. The 1856 Democratic National Convention met that June, producing a platform that reflected Buchanan's views, including support for the Fugitive Slave Act, which required the return of escaped slaves. The platform also called for an end to anti-slavery agitation and U.S. "ascendancy in the Gulf of Mexico". President Pierce hoped for re-nomination, while Senator Stephen A. Douglas also loomed as a strong candidate. He won the nomination after seventeen ballots after Douglas' resignation. He was joined on the ticket by John C. Breckinridge of Kentucky in order to maintain regional proportional representation, placating supporters of Pierce and Douglas, also allies of Breckinridge.

Buchanan faced two candidates in the general election: former Whig President Millard Fillmore ran as the candidate for the anti-Catholic, anti-immigrant American Party (also called the Know Nothing party), while John C. Frémont ran as the Republican nominee. The contrast between Buchanan and Frémont was particularly stark, with opposing caricaturists drawing the Democratic candidate as a fussy old man in drag. Instead of actively campaigning, Buchanan wrote letters and pledged to uphold the Democratic platform and mainly ran an informal front porch campaign at his home of Wheatland. In the election, he carried every slave state except for Maryland, as well as five slavery-free states, including his home state of Pennsylvania. He won 45 percent of the popular vote and decisively won the electoral vote, taking 174 of 296 votes. His election made him the first president from Pennsylvania. In a combative victory speech, Buchanan denounced Republicans, calling them a "dangerous" and "geographical" party that had unfairly attacked the South. He also declared, "the object of my administration will be to destroy sectional party, North or South, and to restore harmony to the Union under a national and conservative government." Buchanan set about this initially by feigning a sectional balance in his cabinet appointments.

== Presidency (1857–1861) ==
=== Inauguration ===
Buchanan was inaugurated on March 4, 1857, taking the oath of office from Chief Justice Roger B. Taney. His inaugural address included a pledge of serving only one term. He abhorred the growing divisions over slavery and its status in the territories, saying that Congress should play no role in determining the status of slavery in the states or territories. He proposed a solution based on the Kansas–Nebraska Act, which stated that the principle of popular sovereignty was decisive, and Congress had no say in the matter. Buchanan recommended that a federal slave code be enacted to protect the rights of slaveowners in federal territories.

=== Personnel ===
==== Cabinet and administration ====
Buchanan cabinet
Office	Name	Term
President	James Buchanan	1857–1861
Vice President	John C. Breckinridge	1857–1861
Secretary of State	Lewis Cass	1857–1860
Jeremiah S. Black	1860–1861
Secretary of the Treasury	Howell Cobb	1857–1860
Philip Francis Thomas	1860–1861
John Adams Dix	1861
Secretary of War	John B. Floyd	1857–1860
Joseph Holt	1861
Attorney General	Jeremiah S. Black	1857–1860
Edwin Stanton	1860–1861
Postmaster General	Aaron V. Brown	1857–1859
Joseph Holt	1859–1860
Horatio King	1861
Secretary of the Navy	Isaac Toucey	1857–1861
Secretary of the Interior	Jacob Thompson	1857–1861

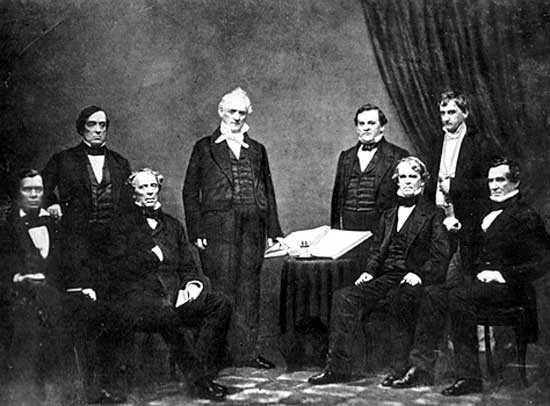
President Buchanan and his Cabinet, photograph by Mathew Brady (c. 1859). From left to right: Jacob Thompson, Lewis Cass, John B. Floyd, James Buchanan, Howell Cobb, Isaac Toucey, Joseph Holt and Jeremiah S. Black

As his inauguration approached, Buchanan sought to establish an obedient, harmonious cabinet to avoid the in-fighting that had plagued Andrew Jackson's presidency. The cabinet's composition had to do justice to the proportional representation within the party and between the regions of the country. Buchanan first worked on this task in Wheatland until he traveled to the capital in January 1857. There, like many other guests at the National Hotel, he contracted severe dysentery, from which he did not fully recover until several months later. Dozens of those who fell ill died, including Buchanan's nephew and private secretary Eskridge Lane.

Historian William G. Shade described the composition of Buchanan's cabinet as a "disaster", noting that four Southern members were slaveholders who later supported the Confederate States of America. Secretary of the Treasury Howell Cobb was considered the greatest political talent in the Cabinet, while the three department heads from the northern states were all considered to be doughfaces. His objective was to dominate the cabinet, and he chose men who would agree with his views.

Buchanan had a troubled relationship with his vice president from the beginning, when he did not receive him during his inaugural visit but referred him to his niece and First Lady, which Breckinridge never forgave him for and saw as disrespectful. He left out the influential Stephen A. Douglas, who had made Buchanan's nomination possible by resigning at the National Convention the previous year, when filling the post. Concentrating on foreign policy, he appointed the aging Lewis Cass as Secretary of State. Buchanan's appointment of Southerners and their allies alienated many in the North, and his failure to appoint any followers of Douglas divided the party. Outside of the cabinet, he left in place many of Pierce's appointments but removed a large number of Northerners who had ties to Democratic opponents Pierce or Douglas.

==== Judicial appointments ====
Buchanan appointed one Justice, Nathan Clifford, to the Supreme Court of the United States. He appointed seven other federal judges to United States district courts. He also appointed two judges to the United States Court of Claims.

=== Intervention in the Dred Scott case ===
The case of Dred Scott v. Sandford, to which Buchanan referred in his inaugural address, dated back to 1846. Dred Scott sued for his release in Missouri, claiming he lived in service to the proprietor in Illinois and Wisconsin Territory. The case reached the Supreme Court and gained national attention by 1856. Buchanan consulted with Justice John Catron in January 1857, inquiring about the outcome of the case and suggesting that a broader decision, beyond the specifics of the case, would be more prudent. Buchanan hoped that a broad decision protecting slavery in the territories could lay the issue to rest, allowing him to focus on other issues.

Catron replied on February 10, saying that the Supreme Court's Southern majority would decide against Scott, but would likely have to publish the decision on narrow grounds unless Buchanan could convince his fellow Pennsylvanian, Justice Robert Cooper Grier, to join the majority of the court. Buchanan then wrote to Grier and prevailed upon him, providing the majority leverage to issue a broad-ranging decision sufficient to render the Missouri Compromise of 1820 unconstitutional.

Two days after Buchanan was sworn in as president, Chief Justice Taney delivered the Dred Scott decision, which denied the petitioner's request to be freed from slavery. The ruling broadly asserted that Congress had no constitutional power to exclude slavery in the territories. According to this decision, slaves were forever the property of their owners without rights, and no African American could ever be a full citizen of the United States, even if he or she had full civil rights in a state. Buchanan's letters were not made public at the time, but he was seen conversing quietly with the Chief Justice during his inauguration. When the decision was issued, Republicans began spreading the word that Taney had informed Buchanan of the impending outcome. Rather than destroying the Republican platform as Buchanan had hoped, the decision infuriated Northerners, who condemned it.

Grier had leaked the decision in the Dred Scott case early to Buchanan. In his inaugural address, Buchanan declared that the issue of slavery in the territories would be "speedily and finally settled" by the Supreme Court. According to historian Paul Finkelman:

Buchanan already knew what the Court was going to decide. In a major breach of Court etiquette, Justice Grier, who, like Buchanan, was from Pennsylvania, had kept the President-elect fully informed about the progress of the case and the internal debates within the Court. When Buchanan urged the nation to support the decision, he already knew what Taney would say. Republican suspicions of impropriety turned out to be fully justified.

Historians agree that the court decision was a major disaster because it dramatically inflamed tensions, leading to the Civil War. In 2022, historian David W. Blight argued that the year 1857 was, "the great pivot on the road to disunion ... largely because of the Dred Scott case, which stoked the fear, distrust and conspiratorial hatred already common in both the North and the South to new levels of intensity."

=== Panic of 1857 ===
The Panic of 1857 began when the New York branch of Ohio Life Insurance and Trust Company announced its insolvency. The crisis spread rapidly, with 1,400 state banks and 5,000 businesses going bankrupt before the year ended. Unemployment and hunger became common in northern cities, but the agricultural south was more resilient. Buchanan agreed with the southerners who attributed the economic collapse to over-speculation.

Buchanan acted in accordance with Jacksonian democracy principles, which restricted paper money issuance, and froze federal funds for public works projects, causing resentment among some of the population due to his refusal to implement an economic stimulus program. While the government was "without the power to extend relief", it would continue to pay its debts in specie, and while it would not curtail public works, none would be added. In hopes of reducing paper money supplies and inflation, he urged the states to restrict the banks to a credit level of $3 to $1 of specie and discouraged the use of federal or state bonds as security for bank note issues. The economy recovered in several years, though many Americans suffered as a result of the panic. Buchanan had hoped to reduce the deficit, but by the time he left office the federal budget grew by 15%.

=== Utah War ===
Utah had been settled by Mormons prior to Buchanan's presidency, and under the leadership of Brigham Young the Mormons had grown increasingly hostile to federal intervention. Young harassed federal officers and discouraged outsiders from settling in the Salt Lake City area, and in September 1857 the Utah Territorial Militia perpetrated the Mountain Meadows massacre against Arkansans headed for California. Buchanan also took personal offense to Young's polygamous behavior.

Believing the Mormons were openly rebelling against the United States, Buchanan sent the army in November 1857 to replace Young as governor with the non-Mormon Alfred Cumming. While the Mormons had frequently defied federal authority, Philip Shriver Klein wrote in 1962 there were questions raised on whether Buchanan's actions were justifiable. Complicating matters, Young's notice of his replacement was not delivered because the Utah mail contract was annulled during Franklin Pierce's presidency. After Young reacted to the military action by mustering a two-week expedition destroying wagon trains, oxen, and other Army property, Buchanan dispatched Thomas L. Kane as a private agent to negotiate peace. The mission succeeded, the new governor was shortly placed in office, and the Utah War ended. The president granted amnesty to all inhabitants who would respect the authority of the government, and moved the federal troops to a nonthreatening distance for the balance of his administration. Young largely accepted federal authority after the Utah War ended, even when continuing to practice polygamy afterwards.

This war has been referred to as "Buchanan's Blunder", with Utah residents complaining he neglected to investigate charges of violence or judicial irregularities prior to sending in army soldiers. Historians wrote that the Utah War could have become more violent than it did, and that the whole conflict might have been avoided with him communicating more in advance about choosing to replace Young. According to William P. MacKinnon, it was "Not Just Buchanan's Blunder" when the ultimate goal of subordinating Young and Mormons was justified, even when carried out in a flawed way. He also mentioned that "During the Utah War neither side had clean hands with respect to violence and atrocities. In quite different ways and on a substantially different scale both Brigham Young and James Buchanan were accountable, if not culpable, for what took place as well as for what they authorized and communicated."

=== Transatlantic telegraph cable ===
Buchanan received one of the first official messages sent through the transatlantic telegraph cable. After test messages were sent earlier in August 1858, Queen Victoria sent Buchanan a congratulatory message on August 16, 1858, through the newly completed cable. The message expressed hope that the cable would prove "an additional link between the nations whose friendship is founded on their common interest and reciprocal esteem". Queen Victoria's message took 16 hours to send.

Buchanan responded: "It is a triumph more glorious, because far more useful to mankind, than was ever won by conqueror on the field of battle. May the Atlantic telegraph, under the blessing of Heaven, prove to be a bond of perpetual peace and friendship between the kindred nations, and an instrument destined by Divine Providence to diffuse religion, civilization, liberty, and law throughout the world."

=== Bleeding Kansas and constitutional dispute ===
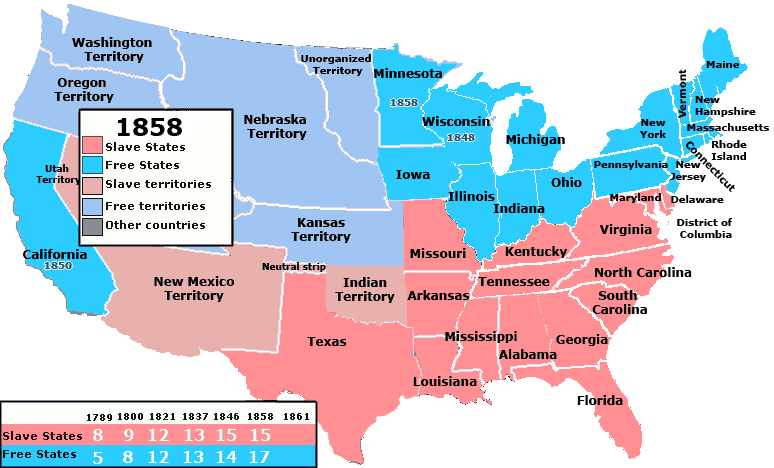
The balance of free and slave states and territories in 1858, after the admission of Minnesota

The Kansas–Nebraska Act of 1854 created the Kansas Territory and allowed the settlers there to decide whether to allow slavery. This resulted in violence between "Free-Soil" (antislavery) and pro-slavery settlers, which developed into the Bleeding Kansas period. The antislavery settlers, with the help of Northern abolitionists, organized their own territorial government in Topeka. The more numerous pro-slavery settlers, many from the neighboring slave state Missouri, established a government in Lecompton, giving the Territory two different governments for a time, with two distinct constitutions, each claiming legitimacy. The admission of Kansas as a state required a constitution be submitted to Congress with the approval of a majority of its residents. Under President Pierce, a series of violent confrontations escalated over who had the right to vote in Kansas. The situation drew national attention, and some in Georgia and Mississippi advocated secession should Kansas be admitted as a free state. Buchanan chose to endorse the pro-slavery Lecompton government.

Buchanan appointed Robert J. Walker to replace John W. Geary as Territorial Governor, and there ensued conflicting referendums from Topeka and Lecompton, where election fraud occurred. In October 1857, the Lecompton government framed the pro-slavery Lecompton Constitution that agreed to a referendum limited solely to the slavery question. However, the vote against slavery, as provided by the Lecompton Convention, would still permit existing slaves, and all their issue, to be enslaved, so there was no referendum that permitted the majority anti-slavery residents to prohibit slavery in Kansas. As a result, anti-slavery residents boycotted the referendum since it did not provide a meaningful choice.

Despite the opposition of Walker and other former Kansas territorial governors, Buchanan decided to support the Lecompton Constitution. In December 1857, Buchanan met with Stephen A. Douglas, chairman of the Senate Committee on Territories, and told him that support for the Lecompton Constitution had become an administration measure expected of Democratic officeholders. On February 2, 1858, Buchanan transmitted the Lecompton Constitution to Congress and recommended Kansas's admission under it. In the message, Buchanan described the rival Topeka government as a revolutionary organization and compared resistance to federal authority in Kansas with the Utah conflict. Buchanan made every effort to secure congressional approval, offering favors, patronage appointments, and even cash for votes. The Lecompton Constitution won the approval of the Senate in March, but a combination of Know-Nothings, Republicans, and Northern Democrats defeated the bill in the House.

Buchanan never forgave Douglas, as the Northern Democrats' rejection was the deciding factor in the House's decision, and he removed all Douglas supporters from his patronage in Illinois and Washington, D.C., installing pro-administration Democrats, including postmasters. Rather than accepting defeat, Buchanan backed the 1858 English Bill, which offered Kansas immediate statehood and vast public lands in exchange for accepting the Lecompton Constitution. In August 1858, Kansans by referendum strongly rejected the Lecompton Constitution. The territory received an abolitionist constitution, which was bitterly opposed in Congress by representatives and senators from the southern states until Kansas was admitted to the Union in January 1861.

The dispute over Kansas became the battlefront for control of the Democratic Party. On one side were Buchanan, the majority of Southern Democrats, and the doughfaces. On the other side were Douglas and the majority of northern Democrats, as well as a few Southerners. Douglas' faction continued to support the doctrine of popular sovereignty, while Buchanan insisted that Democrats respect the Dred Scott decision and its repudiation of federal interference with slavery in the territories.

=== 1858 mid-term elections ===
Douglas' Senate term was coming to an end in 1859, with the Illinois legislature, elected in 1858, determining whether Douglas would win re-election. The Senate seat was the primary issue of the legislative election, marked by the famous debates between Douglas and his Republican opponent for the seat, Abraham Lincoln. Buchanan, working through federal patronage appointees in Illinois, ran candidates for the legislature in competition with both the Republicans and the Douglas Democrats. This could easily have thrown the election to the Republicans, and showed the depth of Buchanan's animosity toward Douglas. In the end, Douglas Democrats won the legislative election and Douglas was re-elected to the Senate. In that year's elections, Douglas forces took control throughout the North, except in Buchanan's home state of Pennsylvania. Buchanan's support was otherwise reduced to a narrow base of southerners.

The division between northern and southern Democrats allowed the Republicans to win a plurality of the House in the 1858 elections, and allowed them to block most of Buchanan's agenda. Buchanan, in turn, added to the hostility with his veto of six substantial pieces of Republican legislation. Among these measures were the Homestead Act, which would have given 160 acres of public land to settlers who remained on the land for five years, and the Morrill Act, which would have granted public lands to establish land-grant colleges. Buchanan argued that these acts were unconstitutional. In the western and northwestern United States, where the Homestead Act was very popular, even many Democrats condemned the president's policies, while many Americans who considered education an important asset resented Buchanan's veto of agricultural colleges.

=== Foreign policy ===
Buchanan took office with an ambitious foreign policy, designed to establish U.S. hegemony over Central America at the expense of Great Britain. Buchanan sought to revitalize manifest destiny and to enforce the Monroe Doctrine, which had been under attack from the Spanish, French, and especially the British in the 1850s. He hoped to re-negotiate the Clayton–Bulwer Treaty to counter European imperialism in the Western Hemisphere, which he thought limited U.S. influence in the region. He also sought to establish American protectorates over the Mexican states of Chihuahua and Sonora to secure American citizens and investments, and most importantly, he hoped to achieve his long-term goal of annexing Cuba. However, Buchanan's ambitions in Cuba and Mexico were largely blocked by the House of Representatives. After long negotiations with the British, he convinced them to cede the Bay Islands to Honduras and the Mosquito Coast to Nicaragua.

In 1858, Buchanan ordered the Paraguay expedition to punish Paraguay for firing on the USS Water Witch, ordering 2,500 marines and 19 warships there. This costly expedition took months to reach Asunción, which successfully resulted in a Paraguayan apology and payment of an indemnity. The chiefs of Raiatea and Tahaa in the South Pacific, refusing to accept the rule of King Tamatoa V, unsuccessfully petitioned the United States to accept the islands under a protectorate in June 1858. Buchanan also considered buying Alaska from the Russian Empire, as whaling in the waters there had become of great economic importance to the United States. Buchanan fueled this by spreading the rumor to the Russian ambassador Eduard de Stoeckl in December 1857 that a large amount of Mormons intended to emigrate to Russian Alaska. In the winter of 1859, an initial purchase offer of $5,000,000 (equivalent to $179,170,000 in 2025) was made. Although the project ultimately failed due to the reservations of Foreign Minister Alexander Gorchakov, the talks formed the basis for the later negotiations to purchase Alaska.

Buchanan sought trade agreements with the Qing dynasty and Japan. In China, his envoy William Bradford Reed succeeded in having the United States included as a party to the Treaty of Tianjin. In May 1860, Buchanan received a Japanese delegation consisting of several princes who carried the Harris Treaty negotiated by Townsend Harris for mutual ratification. Buchanan was offered a herd of elephants by King Rama IV of Siam alongside a ceremonial sword and a photograph of the King’s family, though the letter arrived after Buchanan's departure from office and Buchanan's successor Abraham Lincoln declined the offer stating that the U.S. had an unsuitable climate for elephants but accepted the ceremonial blade and photograph. Other presidential pets included a pair of bald eagles and a Newfoundland dog.

=== Covode Committee ===
In March 1860, the House impaneled the Covode Committee to investigate the Buchanan administration's patronage system for alleged impeachable offenses, such as bribery and extortion of representatives. Buchanan supporters accused the committee, consisting of three Republicans and two Democrats, of being blatantly partisan, and claimed its chairman, Republican Rep. John Covode, was acting on a personal grudge stemming from a disputed land grant designed to benefit Covode's railroad company. The Democratic committee members, as well as Democratic witnesses, were enthusiastic in their condemnation of Buchanan.

The committee was unable to establish grounds for impeaching Buchanan; however, the majority report issued on June 17 alleged corruption and abuse of power among members of his cabinet. The committee gathered evidence that Buchanan had tried to bribe members of Congress in his favor through intermediaries in the spring of 1858 in connection with the pro-slavery Lecompton Constitution of Kansas, and threatened their relatives with losing their posts if they did not vote in favor of the Lecompton Constitution. Witnesses also testified that the federal government used public funds to strengthen the intra-party faction of Douglas' opponents in Illinois. The Democrats pointed out that evidence was scarce, but did not refute the allegations; one of the Democratic members, Rep. James Carroll Robinson, stated that he agreed with the Republicans, though he did not sign it.

The public was shocked by the extent of the bribery, which affected all levels and agencies of government. Buchanan rejected the committee's findings and claimed that he had "passed triumphantly through this ordeal" and that his "vindication is complete". Republican operatives distributed thousands of copies of the Covode Committee report throughout the nation as campaign material in that year's presidential election.

=== Election of 1860 ===
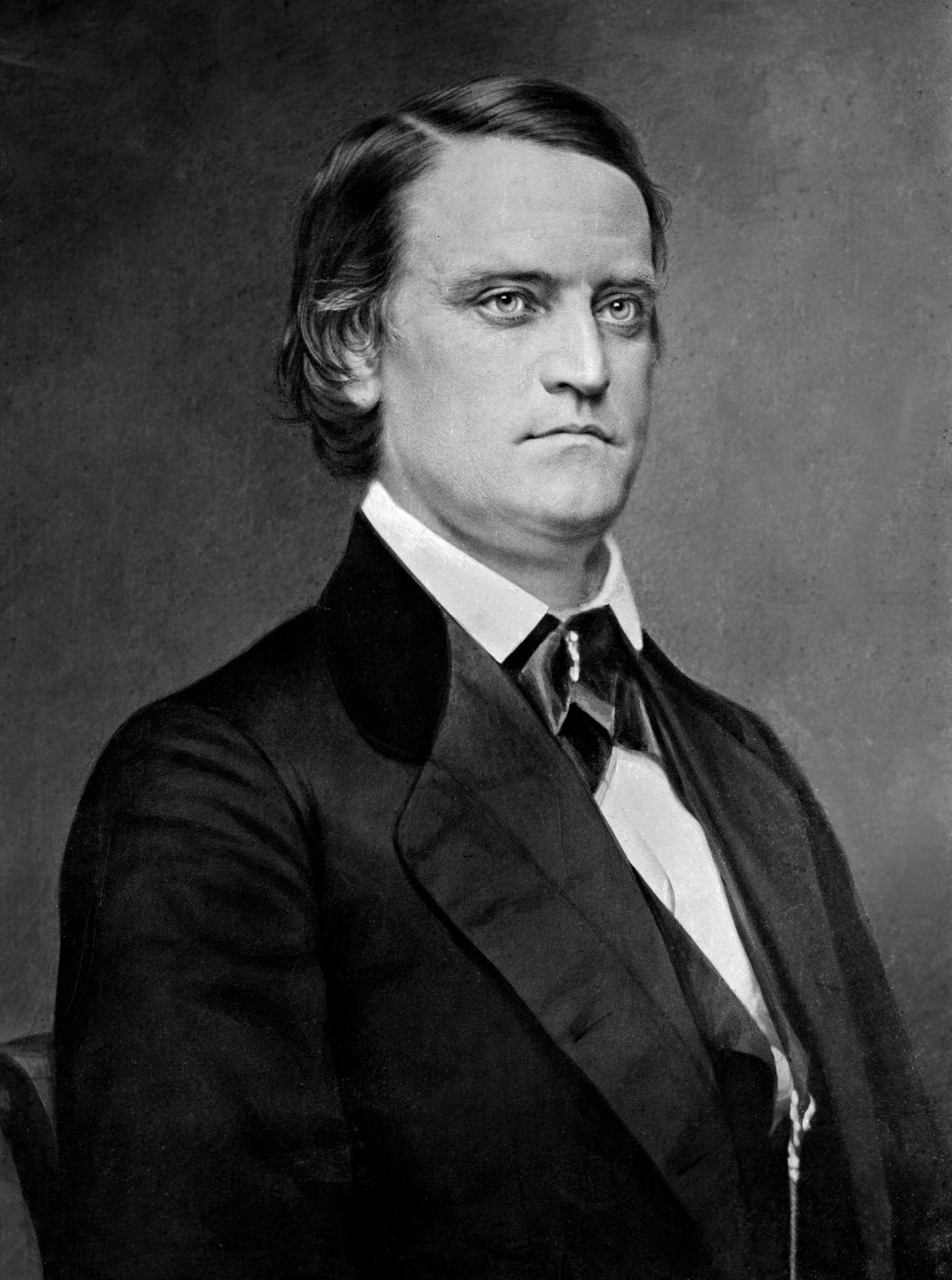
John C. Breckinridge, who served as Vice President of the United States under Buchanan, received his support for the 1860 election

As he had promised in his inaugural address, Buchanan did not seek re-election. He went so far as to tell his ultimate successor, "If you are as happy in entering the White House as I shall feel on returning to Wheatland, you are a happy man."

At the 1860 Democratic National Convention in Charleston, the party split over the issue of slavery in the territories, damaging Buchanan's reputation as the main person responsible for this issue. Though Douglas led after every ballot, he was unable to win the two-thirds majority required. The convention adjourned after 53 ballots, and re-convened in Baltimore in June. After Douglas finally won the nomination, several Southerners refused to accept the outcome, and nominated Vice President Breckinridge as their own candidate. Douglas and Breckinridge agreed on most issues except the protection of slavery. Buchanan, holding a grudge against Douglas, failed to reconcile the party, and tepidly supported Breckinridge. With the splintering of the Democratic Party, Republican nominee Abraham Lincoln won a four-way election that also included John Bell of the Constitutional Union Party. Lincoln's support in the North was enough to give him an Electoral College majority. Buchanan became the last Democrat to win a presidential election until Grover Cleveland in 1884.

As early as October, the army's Commanding General, Winfield Scott, an opponent of Buchanan, warned him that Lincoln's election would likely cause at least seven states to secede from the union. He recommended that massive amounts of federal troops and artillery be deployed to those states to protect federal property, although he also warned that few reinforcements were available. Since 1857, Congress had failed to heed calls for a stronger militia and allowed the army to fall into deplorable condition. Buchanan distrusted Scott and ignored his recommendations. After Lincoln's election, Buchanan directed Secretary of War John B. Floyd to reinforce southern forts with such provisions, arms, and men as were available. However, Floyd persuaded him to revoke the order.

=== Secession ===
With Lincoln's victory, talk of secession and disunion reached a boiling point, putting the burden on Buchanan to address it in his final speech to Congress on December 10. In his message, which was anticipated by both factions, Buchanan denied the right of states to secede but maintained the federal government was without power to prevent them. He placed the blame for the crisis solely on "intemperate interference of the Northern people with the question of slavery in the Southern States," and suggested that if they did not "repeal their unconstitutional and obnoxious enactments ... the injured States, after having first used all peaceful and constitutional means to obtain redress, would be justified in revolutionary resistance to the Government of the Union." Buchanan's only suggestion to solve the crisis was "an explanatory amendment" affirming the constitutionality of slavery in the states, the fugitive slave laws, and popular sovereignty in the territories. His address was sharply criticized both by the North, for its refusal to stop secession, and the South, for denying its right to secede. Five days after the address was delivered, Treasury Secretary Howell Cobb resigned, as his views had become irreconcilable with the president's. Even as the formation of the Confederacy by the secessionist states became increasingly apparent in the winter of 1860, the president continued to surround himself with Southerners and ignore the Republicans.

Status of the states, 1861 States that seceded before April 15, 1861 States that seceded after April 15, 1861 Union states that permitted slavery Union states that banned slavery Territories

South Carolina, long the most radical Southern state, seceded from the Union on December 20, 1860. However, Unionist sentiment remained strong among many in the South, and Buchanan sought to appeal to the Southern moderates who might prevent secession in other states. He met with South Carolinian commissioners in an attempt to resolve the situation at Fort Sumter, which federal forces remained in control of despite its location in Charleston, South Carolina. Buchanan saw Congress, not himself, as responsible for finding a solution to the secession crisis. As a compromise for the southern states, Buchanan envisioned the adoption of amendments to the United States Constitution that would guarantee the right to slavery in the southern states and territories and strengthen the right of slave owners to reclaim escaped slaves as property in the northern states.

He refused to dismiss Interior Secretary Jacob Thompson after the latter was chosen as Mississippi's agent to discuss secession, and he refused to fire Secretary of War John B. Floyd despite an embezzlement scandal. Floyd ended up resigning, but not before sending numerous firearms to Southern states, where they eventually fell into the hands of the Confederacy. Despite Floyd's resignation, Buchanan continued to seek the advice of counselors from the Deep South, including Jefferson Davis and William Henry Trescot. Buchanan's friend Rose O'Neal Greenhow took advantage of the proximity to the president and spied for the Confederacy, which had already established a sophisticated network for gathering information from its eventual opponent before its formation.

Efforts were made in vain by Sen. John J. Crittenden of Kentucky, Rep. Thomas Corwin of Ohio, and former president John Tyler to negotiate a compromise to stop secession, with Buchanan's support. Failed attempts were also made by a group of governors meeting in New York. Buchanan secretly asked President-elect Lincoln to call for a national referendum on the issue of slavery, but Lincoln declined. In December 1860, when the second session of the 36th Congress was convened, The Committee of Thirty-Three was established by the House of Representatives to prevent further states from seceding. They proposed the Corwin Amendment, which would bar Congress from interfering with slavery in states. Despite opposition from Republicans, it passed both houses of Congress and was proposed to states for ratification, but it was never ratified by the requisite number of states.

Despite the efforts of Buchanan and others, six more slave states seceded by the end of January 1861. Buchanan replaced the departed Southern cabinet members with John Adams Dix, Edwin M. Stanton, and Joseph Holt, all of whom were committed to preserving the Union. When Buchanan considered surrendering Fort Sumter, the new cabinet members threatened to resign, and Buchanan relented. On January 5, Buchanan decided to reinforce Fort Sumter, sending the Star of the West with 250 men and supplies. However, the message authorizing Major Robert Anderson to provide covering fire did not reach Fort Sumter in time, forcing the Star of the West to return North without delivering troops or supplies. Buchanan chose not to respond to this act of war, and instead sought to find a compromise to avoid secession. He received a March 3 message from Anderson, that supplies were running low, but the response became Lincoln's to make, as the latter succeeded to the presidency the next day.

=== States admitted to the Union ===
Three new states were admitted to the Union while Buchanan was in office:

- Minnesota – May 11, 1858
- Oregon – February 14, 1859
- Kansas – January 29, 1861

== Post-presidency and death (1861–1868) ==
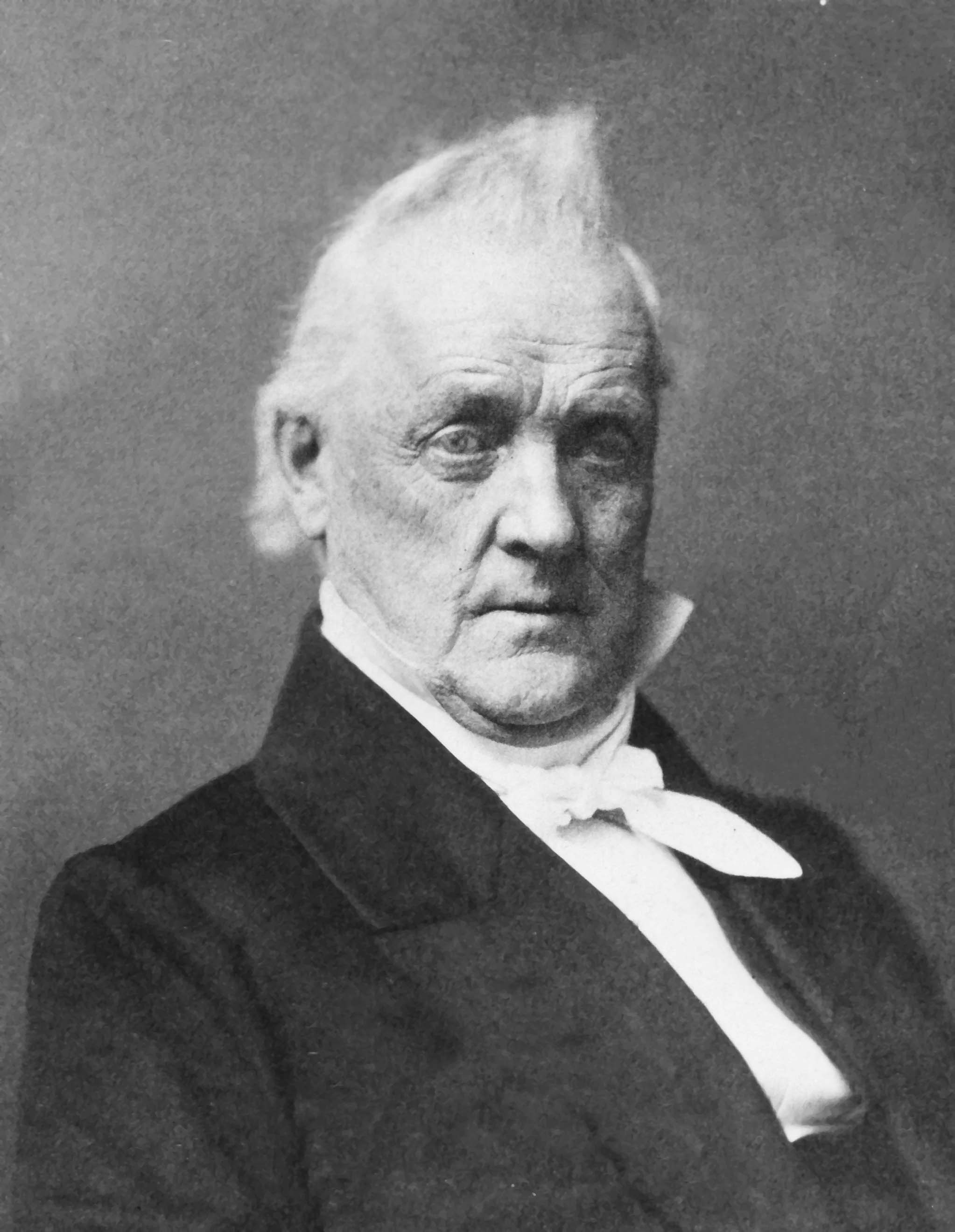
Buchanan in his later years. c. mid-1860s

After leaving office, Buchanan retired to private life in Wheatland. He spent most of his time there in his study, reading books and writing letters. The Civil War erupted one month after his retirement. He supported the Union and the war effort, writing to former colleagues that, "the assault upon Sumter was the commencement of war by the Confederate states, and no alternative was left but to prosecute it with vigor on our part." Buchanan supported Lincoln's introduction of universal conscription in the northern states but was an opponent of his Emancipation Proclamation. Although he recognized constitutional violations in some of the president's executive orders, he never criticized them in public. He also wrote a letter to his fellow Pennsylvania Democrats in Harrisburg, urging them and all young men to enlist in the Union army and "join the many thousands of brave & patriotic volunteers who are already in the field."

Buchanan was dedicated to defending his actions prior to the Civil War, which was sometimes dubbed "Buchanan's War". He received hate mail and threatening letters daily, and stores in Lancaster displayed Buchanan's likeness with the eyes inked red, a noose drawn around his neck and the word "TRAITOR" written across his forehead. The Senate proposed a resolution of condemnation, which ultimately failed, and newspapers accused him of colluding with the Confederacy. His former cabinet members, five of whom had been given jobs in the Lincoln administration, refused to defend Buchanan publicly.

Buchanan became distraught by the attacks against him and fell sick and depressed. In 1862, he defended himself in an exchange of letters with Winfield Scott, published in the National Intelligencer. He later wrote his fullest public defense, Mr. Buchanan's Administration on the Eve of the Rebellion, which was published in 1866. In the book's preface, Buchanan blamed the crisis on the "long, active, and persistent hostility" of northern abolitionists toward slavery and on the corresponding resistance of slavery's defenders. He discussed his foreign policy successes and expressed satisfaction with his decisions, even during the secession crisis. He blamed Robert Anderson, Winfield Scott, and Congress for the unresolved issue. Two years after the publication of the memoir, Buchanan caught a cold in May 1868, which quickly worsened due to his advanced age. He died on June 1, 1868, of respiratory failure at the age of 77 at his Lancaster Township home at Wheatland. He was buried at Woodward Hill Cemetery in Lancaster.

== Political views ==
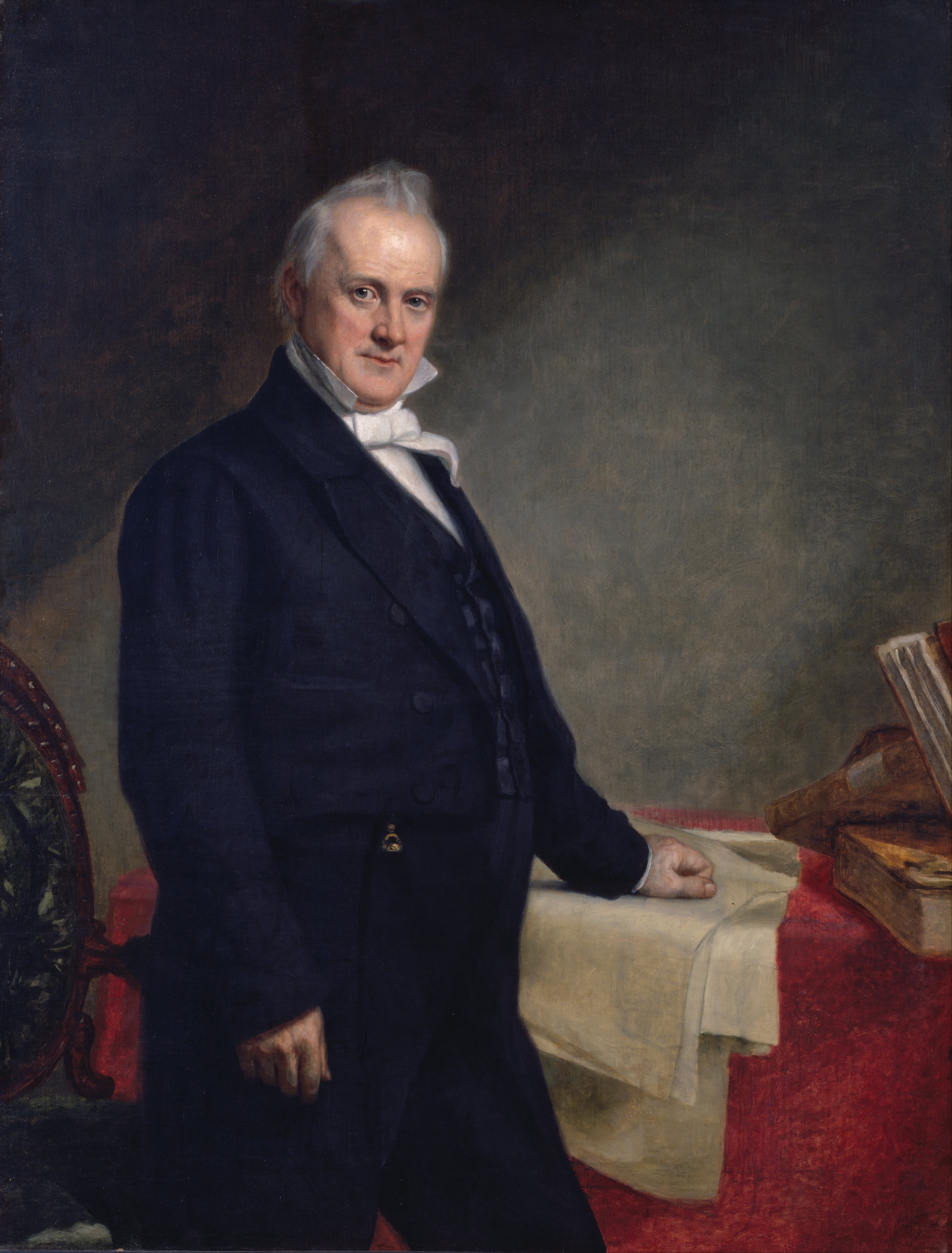
James Buchanan (1859) by George Healy as seen in the National Portrait Gallery in Washington, D.C.

Buchanan was a conservative politician. Anti-slavery northerners often called him a doughface, a term for northerners with principles favoring pro-slavery interests of southerners. Buchanan's sympathies for the Southern states went beyond political expediency for his path to the White House. He identified with cultural and social values that he found reflected in the honor code and lifestyle of the planter class and with which he increasingly came into contact in his retirement community beginning in 1834. Shortly after his election, he said that the "great object" of his administration was "to arrest, if possible, the agitation of the Slavery question in the North and to destroy sectional parties".

Buchanan believed that the abolitionists were preventing the solution to the slavery problem. He stated, "Before [the abolitionists] commenced this agitation, a very large and growing party existed in several of the slave states in favor of the gradual abolition of slavery; and now not a voice is heard there in support of such a measure. The abolitionists have postponed the emancipation of the slaves in three or four states for at least half a century." In deference to the intentions of the typical slaveholder, he was willing to provide the benefit of the doubt. In his third annual message to Congress, the president claimed that the slaves were "treated with kindness and humanity. ... Both the philanthropy and the self-interest of the master have combined to produce this humane result."

Buchanan thought restraint was the essence of good self-government. He believed the Constitution comprised "... restraints, imposed not by arbitrary authority, but by the people upon themselves and their representatives. ... In an enlarged view, the people's interests may seem identical, but to the eye of local and sectional prejudice, they always appear to be conflicting ... and the jealousies that will perpetually arise can be repressed only by the mutual forbearance which pervades the constitution." Regarding slavery and the Constitution, he stated: "Although in Pennsylvania we are all opposed to slavery in the abstract, we can never violate the constitutional compact we have with our sister states. Their rights will be held sacred by us. Under the constitution it is their own question; and there let it remain."

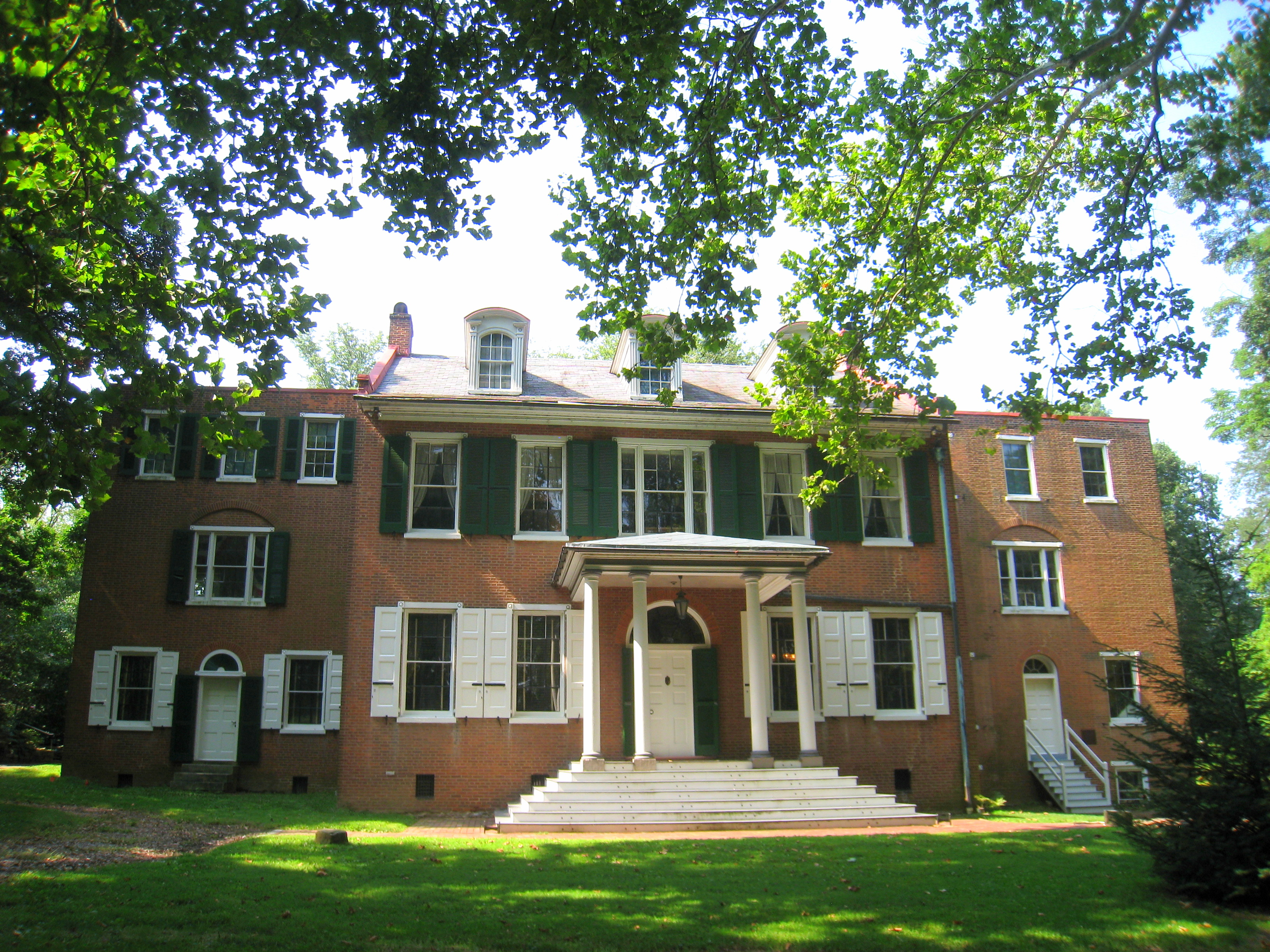
James Buchanan's home, Wheatland

One of the prominent issues of the day was tariffs. Buchanan was conflicted by free trade as well as prohibitive tariffs, since either would benefit one section of the country to the detriment of the other. As a senator from Pennsylvania, he said: "I am viewed as the strongest advocate of protection in other states, whilst I am denounced as its enemy in Pennsylvania."

Buchanan was also torn between his desire to expand the country for the general welfare of the nation, and to guarantee the rights of the people settling particular areas. On territorial expansion, he said, "What, sir? Prevent the people from crossing the Rocky Mountains? You might just as well command the Niagara not to flow. We must fulfill our destiny."

== Personal life ==
Buchanan suffered from esotropia (being cross-eyed). In addition, one eye was short-sighted and the other far-sighted. To cover this, he bent his head forward and leaned it to one side during social interactions. This led to ridicule, which Henry Clay, among others, used ruthlessly during a congressional debate.

In 1818, Buchanan met Anne Caroline Coleman at a grand ball in Lancaster, and the two began courting. Anne was a daughter of the wealthy iron manufacturer Robert Coleman. Robert, like Buchanan's father, was from County Donegal in Ulster. Anne's sister Margaret was the wife of Philadelphia judge Joseph Hemphill, one of Buchanan's colleagues. By 1819, the two were engaged, but spent little time together. Buchanan was busy with his law firm and political projects during the Panic of 1819, which took him away from Coleman for weeks at a time. Rumors spread, including him being involved with other unidentified women. There were also rumors about Buchanan's attentions to other women and his interest in Coleman's fortune reached her during the engagement. According to Buchanan biographer Philip Shriver Klein, Coleman wrote to Buchanan that she believed "it was not regard for her that was his object, but her riches". She broke off the engagement, and on December 9, 1819, died at her sister's home in Philadelphia at age 23. One account described her death as following "strong hysterical convulsions"; Klein later wrote that she appeared to have died from a laudanum overdose, but that it was unknown whether the drug had been taken by instruction, by accident or by intent. Buchanan wrote to her father for permission to attend the funeral, which was refused. At the time of her funeral, he said that, "I feel happiness has fled from me forever." Afterwards, Buchanan claimed that he remained unmarried out of devotion to his only love, who had died young. He was the only president of the United States who never married.

In 1833 and the 1840s, he spoke of plans to marry, but these came to nothing and may merely have been due to his ambitions for a seat in the federal Senate or the White House. In the latter case, the aspirant was 19-year-old Anna Payne, a niece of former First Lady Dolley Madison. During his presidency, an orphaned niece, Harriet Lane, whom he had adopted, served as official White House hostess. There was an unfounded rumor that he had an affair with President Polk's widow, Sarah Childress Polk.

Both of Buchanan's parents were Presbyterians. As early as 1832, he regularly attended the Presbyterian church in Lancaster. In the summer of 1860, Buchanan had a serious discussion with the pastor of the First Presbyterian Church in Manhattan, concluding: "I hope I am a Christian". He declined to join the church at the time, fearing accusations of hypocrisy. During the Civil War, Buchanan reflected increasingly on religion, but was refused admission to the church. In September 1865, the church elders examined him for "evidence of piety" and received him to communion in the Presbyterian Church in the United States of America.

=== Relationship with William R. King ===
Buchanan had a close relationship with William Rufus DeVane King that drew speculation and later historical attention. King, like Buchanan, never married. King was an Alabama politician who briefly served as vice president under Franklin Pierce. Buchanan and King lived together in a Washington boardinghouse and attended social functions together from 1834 until 1844. Such a living arrangement was then common, though Buchanan once referred to the relationship as a "communion". Andrew Jackson mockingly called them "Miss Nancy" and "Aunt Fancy", the former being a 19th-century euphemism for an effeminate man. Buchanan's Postmaster General, Aaron V. Brown, also referred to King as "Aunt Fancy", as well as Buchanan's "better half", and "wife". King died of tuberculosis shortly after Pierce's inauguration, four years before Buchanan became president. Buchanan described him as "among the best, the purest and most consistent public men I have known". Buchanan biographer Jean H. Baker opines that both men's nieces may have destroyed correspondence between the two men. However, she believes that their surviving letters illustrate only "the affection of a special friendship".

Buchanan's lifelong bachelorhood after Anne Coleman died has drawn interest and speculation. According to Charles Dunn, Coleman's death has been speculated to have merely served to deflect questions about Buchanan's sexuality and bachelorhood. When others recommended marriage to him after she had died, his response was "Marry I could not, for my affections were buried in the grave." Philip Shriver Klein wrote in 1955 that marriage was something the president "purposely shunned throughout the remainder of his life" and added how keeping Coleman's letters until dying suggested "he never fully recovered from the crushing effect of her death." Baker suggests that Buchanan was celibate, if not asexual. Some writers have surmised that he was homosexual, including James W. Loewen, Robert P. Watson, and Shelley Ross. Loewen indicated that Buchanan, late in life, wrote a letter acknowledging that he might marry a woman who could accept his "lack of ardent or romantic affection".

== Legacy ==
=== Historical reputation ===
Although Buchanan predicted that "history will vindicate my memory," historians have criticized Buchanan for his unwillingness or inability to act in the face of secession. Historical rankings of presidents of the United States without exception place Buchanan among the least successful presidents. When scholars are surveyed, he ranks at or near the bottom in terms of vision/agenda-setting, domestic leadership, foreign policy leadership, and moral authority. According to surveys taken by American scholars and political scientists between 1948 and 1982, Buchanan ranks every time among the worst presidents of the United States, alongside Warren G. Harding, Millard Fillmore, and Richard Nixon.

During the civil rights movement in 1962, Klein wrote that Buchanan's "many talents, which in a quieter era might have gained for him a place among the great presidents, were quickly overshadowed by the cataclysmic events of civil war and by the towering Abraham Lincoln". Biographer Jean Baker is more critical of him, saying in 2004 he was not indecisive or inactive. She wrote:

Buchanan's failing during the crisis over the Union was not inactivity, but rather his partiality for the South, a favoritism that bordered on disloyalty in an officer pledged to defend all the United States. He was that most dangerous of chief executives, a stubborn, mistaken ideologue whose principles held no room for compromise. His experience in government had only rendered him too self-confident to consider other views. In his betrayal of the national trust, Buchanan came closer to committing treason than any other president in American history.

Michael Birkner's works about Buchanan contain a very negative view. For Lori Cox Han, he ranks among scholars "as either the worst president in [American] history or as part of a lowest ranking failure category". Civil War historian Bruce Catton wrote that "the whole point of the Buchanan cabinet was that, like the President himself, it was qualified to do nothing of any consequence with great dignity". He counts Buchanan's success at preventing Stephen A. Douglas from being the 1860 presidential candidate of a united Democratic Party as being his only deed of consequence.

=== Memorials ===
A bronze and granite memorial near the southeast corner of Washington, D.C.'s Meridian Hill Park was designed by architect William Gorden Beecher and sculpted by Maryland artist Hans Schuler. It was commissioned in 1916 but not approved by the U.S. Congress until 1918, and not completed and unveiled until June 26, 1930. The memorial features a statue of Buchanan, bookended by male and female classical figures representing law and diplomacy, with engraved text reading: "The incorruptible statesman whose walk was upon the mountain ranges of the law," a quote from a member of Buchanan's cabinet, Jeremiah S. Black.

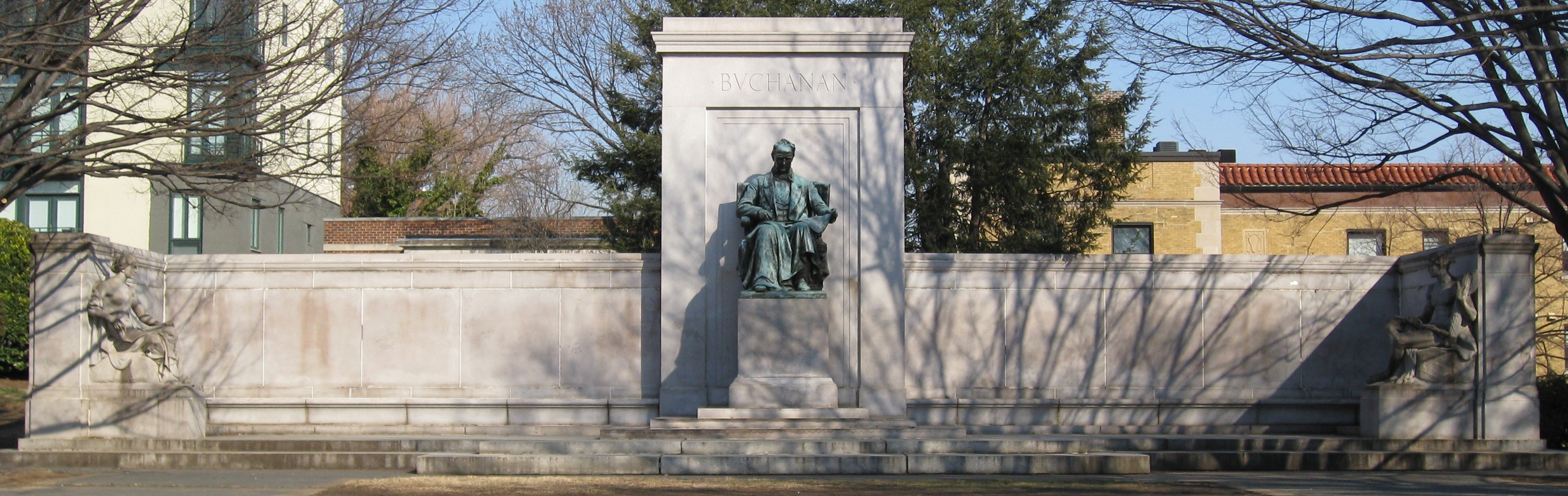
Buchanan memorial, Washington, D.C.

An earlier monument was constructed in 1907–1908 and dedicated in 1911, on the site of Buchanan's birthplace in Stony Batter, Pennsylvania. Part of the original 18.5-acre (75,000 m^{2}) memorial site is a 250-ton pyramid structure that stands on the site of the original cabin where Buchanan was born. The monument was designed to show the original weathered surface of the native rubble and mortar.

Three counties are named in his honor, in Iowa, Missouri, and Virginia. Another in Texas was christened in 1858 but renamed Stephens County, after the newly elected vice president of the Confederate States of America, Alexander Stephens, in 1861. The city of Buchanan, Michigan, was also named after him. Pennsylvania's memorial Buchanan State Forest, located near the Maryland state border, and due South of Bedford, Pennsylvania, is also named after him. In 1964, Buchanan's alma mater, Dickinson College, inaugurated a residence hall for upperclassmen named in his honor.

== See also ==
- Historical rankings of presidents of the United States
- List of federal political sex scandals in the United States
- List of presidents of the United States
- List of presidents of the United States by previous experience
- Presidents of the United States on U.S. postage stamps

== Notes ==
U.S. House of Representatives
Preceded by Jacob Hibshman	Member of the House of Representatives from Pennsylvania's 3rd congressional district Seat 1; 1821–1823	Succeeded by Daniel H. Miller
Preceded by James S. Mitchell	Member of the House of Representatives from Pennsylvania's 4th congressional district Seat 1; 1823–1831	Succeeded by William Muhlenberg Hiester
Preceded by Philip P. Barbour	Chair of the House Judiciary Committee; 1829–1831	Succeeded by Warren R. Davis
Diplomatic posts
Preceded by John Randolph	United States Minister to Russia; 1832–1833	Succeeded by William Wilkins
Preceded by Joseph Reed Ingersoll	United States Minister to the United Kingdom; 1853–1856	Succeeded by George M. Dallas
U.S. Senate
Preceded by William Wilkins	United States Senator (Class 3) from Pennsylvania; 1834–1845; Served alongside: Samuel McKean, Daniel Sturgeon	Succeeded by Simon Cameron
Political offices
Preceded by John C. Calhoun	United States Secretary of State; 1845–1849	Succeeded by John M. Clayton
Preceded by Franklin Pierce	President of the United States; 1857–1861	Succeeded by Abraham Lincoln
Party political offices
Preceded by Franklin Pierce	Democratic nominee for President of the United States; 1856	Succeeded by Stephen A. Douglas¹; John C. Breckinridge
Notes and references
1. The Democratic Party split in 1860, producing two presidential candidates. Douglas was nominated by Northern Democrats; Breckinridge was nominated by Southern Democrats.
