= James Buchanan Sr. =

Father of 15th U.S. president James Buchanan

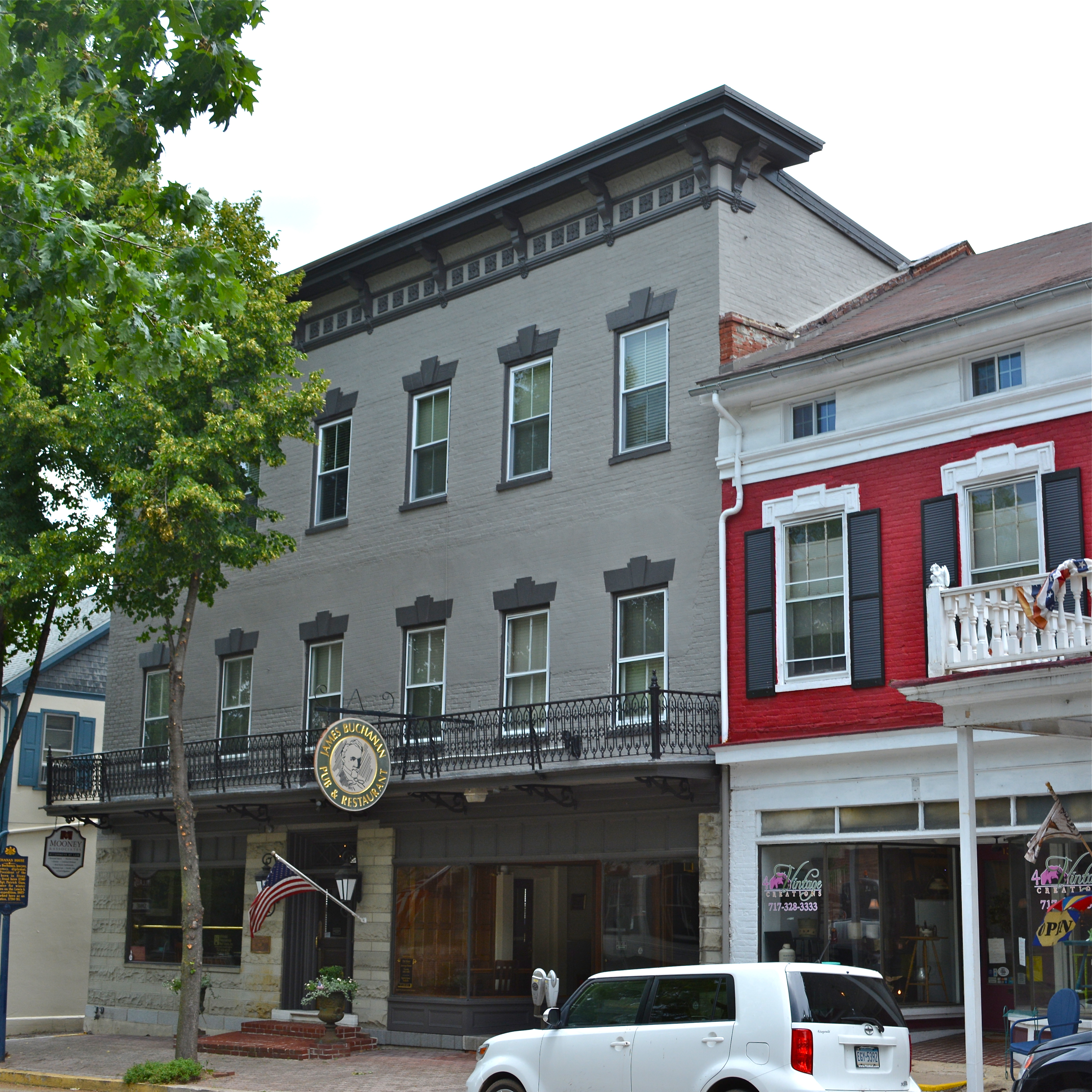
The Buchanans' Mercersburg house (now the James Buchanan Hotel) in 2014

James Buchanan Sr. (1761 – June 11, 1821) was a Scotch-Irish shopkeeper and the father of 15th U.S. president James Buchanan (Jr.).

== Biography ==
James Buchanan was born in 1761 to John Buchanan and Jane Russell. Because his mother died and his father abandoned him in his infancy, he was raised by his maternal uncle, Samuel Russell, on a farm in County Donegal, Ireland called the Big Airds. In his care James was well-educated. Penniless, he took a brig to Pennsylvania in July 1783 to live with another uncle, Joshua Russell, who owned a tavern in Hunterstown. There he met Elizabeth Speer, a neighbor's sixteen-year-old daughter.

He moved to Franklin County after a few months' stay in Philadelphia. For several years, he worked as a clerk at a trading post nicknamed "Stony Batter" in Cove Gap. The owner of Stony Batter tried to sell Buchanan the post in 1786, but had to liquidate all his assets after a lawsuit against him. Buchanan bought out the post in 1787. He married Elizabeth Speer on April 16, 1788, and they lived in his log cabin on Stony Batter. The couple had eleven children (five sons and six daughters), eight of whom survived to adulthood, including James Jr. and Jane, the mother of first lady Harriet Lane.

In 1796, James Buchanan Sr., at Elizabeth's behest, moved the family into a house he built in central Mercersburg, out of which he ran a shop; Stony Batter was given to John Speer, Elizabeth's brother. Buchanan was briefly Mercersburg's justice of the peace. He became a successful real estate investor and, according to the historian, Jean H. Baker, Mercersburg's wealthiest man. He and Elizabeth were Presbyterians who imparted to their children the same religious beliefs.

He gave James Jr. the tasks of being a bookkeeper and assistant at his shop, which taught the boy about accounting and the importance of being precise with numbers. He was a strict father whom James Jr. "both loved and feared"; he was rarely satisfied with his son's work at the shop, but they had a respectful relationship. A Federalist, he often argued about politics, which informed his son's political views. After James Jr. became an attorney, Buchanan wanted him to remain such, and disapproved of his entry in 1814 into the Pennsylvania House of Representatives; however, he accepted his son's political career by 1815.

Buchanan died, at sixty years of age, on June 11, 1821; he had fallen from a carriage and hit his head against its wheel after the horse pulling the vehicle bolted. His body was buried in Waddell's Graveyard (now Spring Grove Cemetery). As he was intestate, James Jr. had to sort his affairs out; he used his father's money to provide for his mother and unmarried sisters, and pay his younger brothers' tuitions. In 1867, James Buchanan Jr. had a new headstone erected above James Sr.'s grave.

== Works cited ==
- McMurty, R. Gerald (Robert Gerald) (1934). James Buchanan in Kentucky, 1813. [Louisville, Ky.]
- Gullan, Harold I. (2004). First fathers: the men who inspired our Presidents. Hoboken, N.J: John Wiley & Sons. ISBN 978-0-471-46597-3.
- Klein, Philip Shriver (1987). President James Buchanan. Easton Press.
- Baker, Jean H. (2004). James Buchanan. Times Books. ISBN 978-0-8050-6946-4.
- Young, Jeff C. (1997). The fathers of American presidents : from Augustine Washington to William Blythe and Roger Clinton. Jefferson, N.C. : McFarland & Co. ISBN 978-0-7864-0182-6.
- Foss, William O. (2005). Childhoods of the American presidents. Jefferson, N.C. : McFarland. ISBN 978-0-7864-2382-8.
