= Elizabeth Speer Buchanan =

Mother of 15th U.S. president James Buchanan

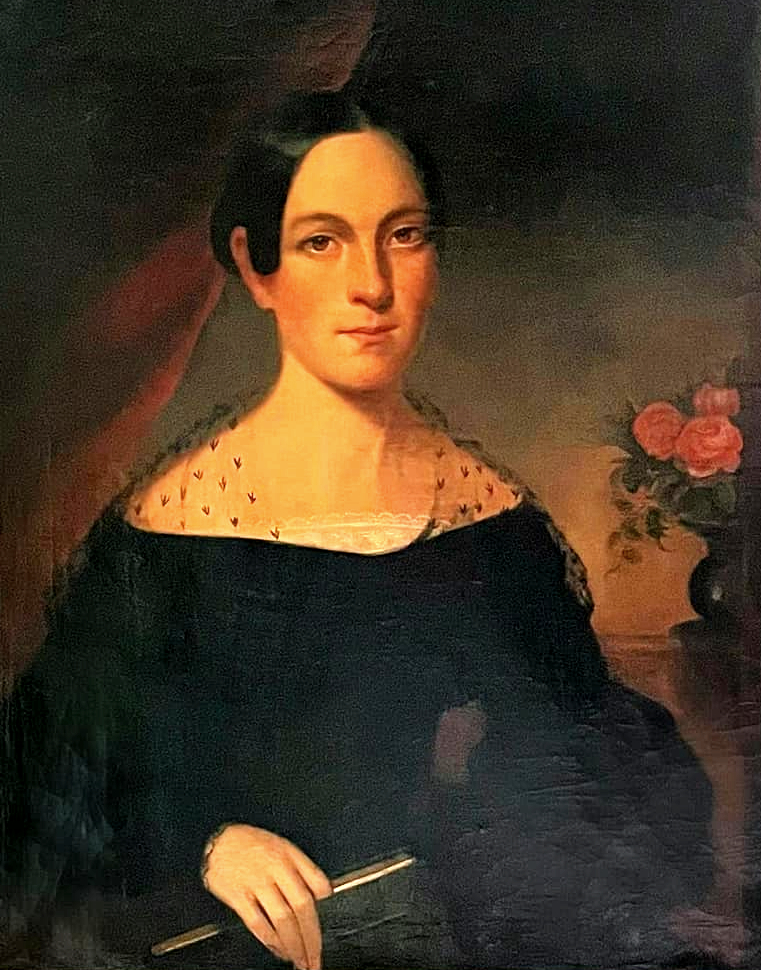
Portrait of Elizabeth Buchanan, artist unknown

Elizabeth Buchanan (née Speer; April 16, 1767 - May 14, 1833) was the mother of 15th U.S. President James Buchanan.

== Biography ==
Elizabeth Speer was born on April 16, 1767 on her father's farm in Lancaster County, Pennsylvania. She was the only daughter of Mary (née Patterson) and James Speer, but had four older brothers. She was of Scotch-Irish descent; James Speer, an emigrant from Scotland, had moved with Mary to Pennsylvania in 1756. Sometime during Elizabeth's youth the family moved to a plot between Chambersburg and Gettysburg, Pennsylvania. Mary Patterson died when Elizabeth was young; Elizabeth became the one henceforth responsible for housework.

Circa 1783 she met and fell in love with James Buchanan Sr., a local tavern keeper's nephew. They married at the Upper West Conococheage Church in Mercersburg, Pennsylvania on April 16, 1788, whereupon she moved into his home at his trading post in Cove Gap. The couple had eleven children (five sons and six daughters), eight of whom survived to adulthood; including James and Jane, the mother of first lady Harriet Lane. The first child, Mary, died in 1791 aged two, causing Elizabeth to lavish her affection on James, who had been born shortly before Mary's death; thus he was, until a brother was born when he was fourteen, the family's favorite. In 1796, James Buchanan Sr. moved the family into a house he built near Mercersburg, out of which he ran a shop.

Though she did not receive a complete formal education, she was well-read; she could recite "stanzas of Milton from memory", wrote a poem titled "The Fireside", had a wealth of knowledge about theology and read poetry to her children. She had interests in the poetry of not only Milton but of Alexander Pope, William Cowper and Edward Young. She valued education, particularly for her sons; educated all her children; and enjoyed having arguments with them to nurture their ability to reason. She insisted on continuing to do housework even after the family became financially able to hire help. She and her husband were Presbyterians who imparted onto their children the same religious beliefs. She withdrew into a "closer study of theology" after the deaths of her husband in 1821 and then of a daughter and two of their sons (George and William).

She died aged 66 on May 14, 1833, at her son-in-law's house in Greensburg, Pennsylvania; James Buchanan Jr., who was, at the time, in St. Petersburg, did not find out she had died until his return to the U.S. Her body is buried in Waddell's Graveyard (now Spring Grove Cemetery) north of Mercersburg.

== Works cited ==
- Faber, Doris (1968). The mothers of American Presidents. New York, New American Library.
- Hampton, William Judson (1922). Our Presidents and their Mothers. The Cornhill Publishing Company.
- Gullan, Harold I. (2001). Faith of our mothers : the stories of presidential mothers from Mary Washington to Barbara Bush. Grand Rapids, Mich. : W.B. Eerdmans. ISBN 978-0-8028-4926-7.
- Klein, Philip Shriver (1987). President James Buchanan. Easton Press.
- Smith, Bessie White (1932). The Romances of the Presidents. Lothrop, Lee & Shephard Co.
- Baker, Jean H. (2004). James Buchanan. Times Books. ISBN 978-0-8050-6946-4.
