= Lori Cox Han =

American political scientist and academic

Lori Cox Han is an American political scientist and academic who is a Professor of Political Science and Doy B. Henley Endowed Chair in American Presidential Studies at Chapman University in Orange, California. Her research interests include the American presidency, women and politics, media and politics, and political leadership.

== Education ==
Lori Cox Han earned her M.A. and Ph.D. in Political Science from the University of Southern California. She earned an M.A. in Mass Communication from California State University Northridge, and earned her Bachelor of Arts degree in Political Science and Rhetoric and Communication from University of California Davis.

== Professional career ==
Prior to joining the Chapman University faculty in 2005, Han was an Associate Professor of Political Science at Austin College in Sherman, Texas. She is past president of Presidents and Executive Politics, a section of the American Political Science Association.

== Publications ==
- Madam President? Gender and Politics on the Road to the White House, co-editor Caroline Heldman, Lynne Rienner Publishers, 2020.
- Advising Nixon: The White House Memos of Patrick J. Buchanan, University Press of Kansas, 2019.
- New Directions in the American Presidency, 2nd ed., Routledge, New Directions in American Politics Series, 2018.
- Presidents and the American Presidency, 2nd ed., with Diane J. Heith, Oxford University Press, 2018.
- Women, Power, and Politics: The Fight for Gender Equality in the United States, with Caroline Heldman, Oxford University Press, 2018.
- 2016 Presidential Election Guide, with Diane J. Heith, Oxford University Press, 2017.
- In It to Win: Electing Madam President, Bloomsbury Publishing, 2015.
- Presidents and the American Presidency, with Diane J. Heith, Oxford University Press, 2013.
- Handbook to American Democracy, 4 volumes, with Tomislav Han, Facts on File, 2012.
- A Presidency Upstaged: The Public Leadership of George H.W. Bush, Texas A&M University Press, Joseph V. Hughes Jr. and Holly O. Hughes Series on the Presidency and Leadership, 2011.
- New Directions in the American Presidency, Routledge, New Directions in American Politics Series, 2011.
- Women and U.S. Politics: The Spectrum of Political Leadership, 2nd ed., Lynne Rienner Publishers, 2010.
- Encyclopedia of American Government and Civics, edited with Michael A. Genovese, Facts on File, 2009.
- Leadership and Politics, Vol. 2 of Leadership at the Crossroads, edited with Michael A. Genovese, Praeger Publishers, 2008.
- Rethinking Madam President: Are We Ready for a Woman in the White House? edited with Caroline Heldman, Lynne Rienner Publishers, 2007.
- The Presidency and the Challenge of Democracy, edited with Michael A. Genovese, Palgrave Macmillan Publishers, The Evolving American Presidency Series, 2006.
- In the Public Domain: Presidents and the Challenge of Public Leadership, edited with Diane J. Heith, State University of New York Press, SUNY Series on the Presidency: Contemporary Issues, 2005.
- Governing From Center Stage: White House Communication Strategies during the Television Age of Politics, Hampton Press, Political Communication Series, 2001. Named Choice Outstanding Academic Title in 2002.
