= Jean H. Baker =

American historian (born 1933)

- Born: Jean Hogarth Harvey; February 9, 1933 (age 93); Baltimore, Maryland, U.S.
- Education: Goucher College (BA); Johns Hopkins University (MA, PhD)
- Occupation: Historian
- Spouse: Ralph Baker (m. 1953; died 2021)
- Children: 4
- Writing career
- Years active: 1967–present
- Subjects: American history

Jean Hogarth Harvey Baker (born February 9, 1933) is an American historian and professor emerita at Goucher College, where she was the Bennett-Hartwood Professor of History. Baker was a National Endowment for the Humanities fellow in 1982.

== Early life and education ==
Jean Hogarth Harvey was born in Baltimore, Maryland on February 9, 1933, to Rose Lindsay Hopkins and insurance agent F. Barton Harvey. She received her B.A. from Goucher College in 1961 and her M.A. from The Johns Hopkins University in 1965 alongside fellow historian David Herbert Donald. She completed her Ph.D. from The Johns Hopkins University in 1971.

== Career ==
Baker was an instructor of history at Notre Dame of Maryland University from 1967 to 1969. She began her career at Goucher College as an instructor in 1969. She worked as an assistant professor at Goucher (1969–1975) before becoming an associate professor of history (1975–1978). In 1979, she was made a full professor of history until 1982, when she became the Elizabeth Todd Professor of History. In 1979, she was an editor for the Maryland Historical Magazine, a publication of the Maryland Historical Society. As of 2018, Baker is a professor emerita at Goucher College and the Bennett-Hartwood Professor of History. She also taught courses at the Maryland Correctional Institution - Jessup (MCI-J) as part of the Goucher Prison Education Partnership. Baker was a visiting professor at Harvard College.

Baker is a member of the Organization of American Historians, the American Historical Association, Berkshire Conference of Women Historians, and Phi Beta Kappa.

Her books have received positive reviews.

Baker played an important role in advocating for increased recognition of the role of women in society. In her experience, women were frequently excluded from historical and academic narratives. The Women's Movement empowered Baker to explore these deficits. She wrote stories on suffragists including Lucy Stone, Susan B. Anthony, Elizabeth Cady Stanton, Alice Paul, and Frances Willard. The New York Times lauded Baker's work as "wider in scope than previous work and making use of sophisticated feminist historical and sociological scholarship." In anticipation of the hundredth anniversary of the Nineteenth Amendment, Baker was featured in WYPR's Beyond the Ballot program that features "the contributions of extraordinary Maryland women."

== Bibliography ==
Some of her books are:

- Mary Todd Lincoln: A Biography
- James Buchanan (The American Presidents, #15)
- Sisters: The Lives of America's Suffragists
- Margaret Sanger: A Life of Passion
- Votes for Women: The Struggle for Suffrage Revisited
- The Stevensons: A Biography of an American Family
- Affairs Of Party: The Political Culture of Northern Democrats in the Mid-Nineteenth Century
- The Politics of Continuity: Maryland Political Parties from 1858 to 1870
- Ambivalent Americans: The Know-Nothing Party in Maryland

Additional books, publications, and writings:

- Building America: The Life of Benjamin Henry Latrobe
- Lincoln and New York (with Harold Holzer)
- The Lincoln Marriage: Beyond the Battle of Quotations
- "Mary and Abraham: A Marriage". Boritt, Gabor, ed. The Lincoln Enigma: The Changing Faces of an American Icon
- "Not Much of Me": Abraham Lincoln as a Typical American
- Parallel Lives: Abraham and Mary Lincoln
- "The South Has Been Wronged: James Buchanan and the Secession Crisis". Quist, John W. and Birkner, Michael J., eds. James Buchanan and the Coming of the Civil War
- Women and the U.S. Constitution, 1776-1920

== Awards and honors ==
In 1976, Baker was elected an American Council of Learned Societies fellow. In 1979, she won a faculty teaching prize at Goucher College. She was a National Endowment for the Humanities fellow in 1982 and won the Berkshire Prize in History in 1983 for her book Affairs of Party: The Political Culture of Northern Democrats in the Mid-Nineteenth Century. Baker won the Willie Lee Rose prize in Southern History in 1989. She was a 1991 Newberry Library fellow.

== Personal life ==
Baker lives in Baltimore. On September 12, 1953, she married Ralph Robinson Baker, a surgeon and professor at Johns Hopkins University. The couple, who were married until Ralph Baker's death in 2021, had four children. Baker is a Democrat and an Episcopalian, and enjoys playing tennis and swimming. As a hobby, Baker reads mystery stories.
