= Kern Run =

Physical characteristics
- Source
  - location: large ridge known as "Shade Mountain" in Spring Township, Snyder County, Pennsylvania
  - elevation: 1,664 ft (507 m)
- Mouth
  - location: Middle Creek in Beaver Township, Snyder County, Pennsylvania near Beavertown
  - coordinates: 40°46′25″N 77°10′48″W
  - elevation: 545 ft (166 m)
- Length: 5.7 mi (9.2 km)
- Basin size: 12.3 sq mi (32 km^{2})

Basin features
- Progression: Middle Creek → Penns Creek → Susquehanna River → Chesapeake Bay
- Tributaries
  - right: Luphers Run, Wetzel Run

Kern Run is a tributary of Middle Creek in Snyder County, Pennsylvania, in the United States. It is approximately 5.7 miles (9.2 km) long and flows through Spring Township, Beaver Township, and Beavertown. The watershed of the stream has an area of 12.3 square miles (32 km^{2}). The stream has two named tributaries: Luphers Run and Wetzel Run. Kern Run is dammed in one place to produce a 24-acre (9.7 ha) lake for drinking water and flood control. Some reaches of the stream are impaired. A number of bridges have also been constructed across it. The drainage basin of the stream is designated as a Coldwater Fishery and a Migratory Fishery. Wild trout naturally reproduce within it.

== Course ==
Kern Run begins on a large ridge in Spring Township. It flows down the ridge in a northerly direction for several tenths of a mile before turning east-northeast for about a mile, flowing between the ridge and the much smaller Ore Ridge, and entering Beaver Township. Here, the stream turns north-northeast for a few tenths of a mile before entering an unnamed lake. The stream then turns north-northwest for a few tenths of a mile, leaving its valley. At this point, it turns north-northeast for more than a mile, passing through Beavertown and reentering Beaver Township. In Beavertown, the stream crosses US Route 522 and receives the tributary Luphers Run from the right. A short distance north of Beavertown, it receives the tributary Wetzel Run from the right and turns north-northwest for several tenths of a mile, passing between Freestone Ridge and Thomas Ridge and then reaching its confluence with Middle Creek.

Kern Run joins Middle Creek 22.02 miles (35.44 km) upstream of its mouth.

=== Tributaries ===
Kern Run has two named tributaries: Luphers Run and Wetzel Run. Luphers Run joins Kern Run 1.34 miles (2.16 km) upstream of its mouth and drains an area of 1.79 square miles (4.6 km^{2}). Wetzel Run joins Kern Run 1.10 miles (1.77 km) upstream of its mouth and drains an area of 3.58 square miles (9.3 km^{2}).

== Geography and geology ==
The elevation near the mouth of Kern Run is 545 feet (166 m) above sea level. The elevation of the stream's source is 1,664 feet (507 m) above sea level. The creek is a relatively small stream. Its headwaters are on a ridge sometimes known as Shade Mountain.

In its upper reaches, Kern Run is a mountain stream in a wild setting. In the late 1980s, one book described the stream as a "little mountain brook". However, it goes underground for a time near Beavertown.

North-dipping rock of the Bloomsburg Formation has been discovered on a quarry on Kern Run, approximately 0.75 miles (1.21 km) south of Beavertown.

== Watershed and hydrology ==
The watershed of Kern Run has an area of 12.3 square miles (32 km^{2}). The mouth of the stream is in the United States Geological Survey quadrangle of Beavertown. However its source is in the quadrangle of Beaver Springs. The stream's mouth is located near Beavertown.

Kern Run is dammed in one location; the site is known as PA-638. The lake created by the dam typically has a surface area of 24 acres (9.7 ha), and a volume of 248 acre-feet. The lake drains an area of 5.38 square miles (13.9 km^{2}). The dam itself is 61 feet (19 m) high and has an area of 279,000 cubic yards (213,000 m^{3}).

Upstream of the lake on Kern Run, the watershed of the stream consists of 99 percent forested land, and 1 percent bodies of water, wetlands, and pastures.

Kern Run can be accessed via Township Road 588 from US Route 522.

One reach of Kern Run is designated as an impaired waterbody.

== History ==
Kern Run was entered into the Geographic Names Information System on August 2, 1979. Its identifier in the Geographic Names Information System is 1178399.

A concrete tee beam bridge carrying State Route 4007 and a township road over Kern Run was built north of Beavertown in 1922 and is 40.0 feet (12.2 m) long. A bridge carrying US Route 522 also crosses the stream in Beavertown and Beaver Township. It was slated for replacement for a cost of $500,476.

A lake was created on Kern Run in 1983. It is used for drinking water and flood control and is owned by the Spring Township Municipal Authority. The Spring Township Municipal Authority uses the lake as its primary water supply to serve approximately 1000 people.

== Biology ==
The drainage basin of Kern Run is designated as a Coldwater Fishery and a Migratory Fishery. Wild trout naturally reproduce in the stream for 4.2 miles (6.8 km). The stream is classified as Approved Trout Waters. In the 1980s, however, 3 miles (4.8 km) of the stream was stocked with trout.

== See also ==
- Susquehecka Creek, next tributary of Middle Creek going downstream
- List of rivers of Pennsylvania
