= Midd-West School District =

School district in Pennsylvania

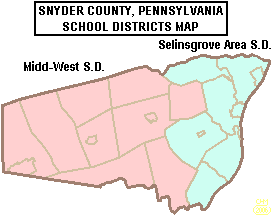

Address
- 568 E. Main Street Middleburg, Snyder County, Pennsylvania, 17842-1295; United States

District information
- Type: Public
- Grades: K-12
- Superintendent: Joseph Stroup

Students and staff
- District mascot: The Mustangs
- Colors: Carolina Blue, Black, Grey and White

Other information
- Website: https://www.mwsd.cc/

Midd-West School District (MWSD) is a midsized, rural, public school district located in the borough of Middleburg in Snyder County, Pennsylvania, in the United States. The Midd-West School District encompasses approximately 226 square miles (590 km^{2}). Midd-West School District serves: Beavertown, McClure, Beaver Springs, Adams Township, Beaver Township, Center Township, Franklin Township, Middlecreek Township, Perry Township, Spring Township, West Beaver Township and West Perry Township. According to 2000 federal census data, it served a resident population of 16,531. Per the US Census Bureau by 2010, the district's population increased to 17,470 people.

According to the Pennsylvania Budget and Policy Center, 47.1% of the District's pupils lived at 185% or below the Federal Poverty Level as shown by their eligibility for the federal free or reduced price school meal programs in 2012. Midd-West School District residents' per capita income was $15,358 in 2009, while the median family income was $39,303 a year. According to the Pennsylvania Department of Education, Midd-West School District had 775 students receiving free or reduced-price lunches due to low family income in the 2007–08 school year. In Snyder County, the median household income was $48,513. By 2013, the median household income in the United States rose to $52,100. In 2014, the median household income in the USA was $53,700. The community is largely agrarian with a few small- to medium-sized manufacturers. The county seat, Middleburg, is located in the district.

Per Midd-West School District officials, in school year 2005–06, the Midd-West School District provided basic educational services to 2,375 pupils. It employed: 186 teachers, 134 full-time and part-time support personnel, and 15 administrators. In 2010, Midd-West School District enrollment was 2,194 pupils. The district is projected by the Pennsylvania Department of Education to continue to decline in enrollment. The district reported an enrollment of 2,219 pupils in 2011–12. It employed: 179 teachers, 134 full-time and part-time support personnel, and thirteen (13) administrators during the 2011–12 school year. The District received $14,712,399 in state funding in the 2011–12 school year. For the 2015–16 school year, the district administration reported an enrollment of 2,245 pupils. The district employed: 165 teachers, 114 non teaching staff members and continued to employ 13 administrators.

Midd-West School District operates four schools: Middleburg Elementary School Grades K-5; West Snyder Elementary School Grades K-5; Midd-West Middle School Grades 6–7, and Midd-West High School Grades 8–12. High school students may choose to attend the SUN Area Technical Institute for training in the construction and mechanical trades, as well as culinary trades.

== History ==
Midd-West School District was founded in 1970 after the merger of the former West Snyder Area and Middleburg Area School Districts. Two high schools had been maintained despite declining enrollment and significant fiscal challenges. In the 2004–2005 school year, Middleburg High School and West Snyder High School were united to form Midd-West High School. The Midd-West School Board voted to realign the district in response to declining enrollment and education program changes, closing 2 elementary schools, at the end of the 2011–12 school year. Midd-West School District operates Middleburg Elementary School, West Snyder Elementary school, Midd West Middle School, and Midd-West High School. Beaver Adams School and Penns Creek School were closed years ago.

Having consolidated two elementary schools, in 2005 the District sold the Penns Creek and Beaver Adams elementary schools via public auction. In 2012, West Beaver Elementary School and Perry-West Perry Elementary School were closed after a district realignment West Snyder Middle School and Middleburg Middle School closed in 2013.

== Programs ==
In addition to the traditional academics, the school district offers technology and job skills training at the SUN Area Career and Technology Center.

High school students have the option of taking courses in agriculture that prepare them for work on farms, nurseries and other agrarian fields. The FFA program has received national recognition for excellence.

== Extracurriculars ==
The Midd-West School District offers a wide variety of clubs, activities and an extensive sports program.

=== Sports ===
MWSD's mascot is the mustang. School colors are Carolina blue and dull silver. Just before the merger of the two high schools, high school students were asked to vote on a new mascot and school colors to replace the old West Snyder HS Mounties (colors: red and white) and Middleburg HS Middies (colors: blue and gold). The sports programs are through the Pennsylvania Heartland Athletic Conference and the Pennsylvania Interscholastic Athletic Association. The Pennsylvania Heartland Athletic Conference is a voluntary association of 25 PIAA High Schools within the central Pennsylvania region.

The District funds:

Boys

- Baseball - AAAA
- Basketball - AAAA
- Football - AAA
- Bowling - AAAA
- Cross Country - AA
- Golf - AAA
- Soccer - AA
- Track and Field - AAA
- Wrestling - AA

Girls

- Basketball - AAAA
- Bowling - AAAA
- Cross Country - AA
- Field Hockey - A
- Lacrosse - AA
- Soccer (Fall) - AA
- Softball - AAAA
- Track and Field - AA
- Volleyball - AAA

- Esports
- According to PIAA directory July 2012

Note: The football program was previously a co-operative program with East Juniata High School, and played under the East Juniata flag (Colors: Red & gray, nicknamel: Tigers), even though their field was in Beaver Springs on Midd-West property. The school board pays $24,000 a year for the students to be able to play PIAA football. In 2016, East Juniata elected to discontinue the agreement. Midd-West turned to neighboring Mifflinburg Area School District to provide an opportunity to its pupils. In 2018, Midd-West would end up starting their own football program, with their inaugural season starting in Fall of 2018.
