= Luphers Run =

Physical characteristics
- Source
  - location: large ridge in Beaver Township, Snyder County, Pennsylvania
  - elevation: 1,814 ft (553 m)
- Mouth
  - location: Kern Run in Beavertown, Snyder County, Pennsylvania
  - coordinates: 40°45′08″N 77°10′38″W
  - elevation: 584 ft (178 m)
- Length: 2.9 mi (4.7 km)
- Basin size: 1.79 mi^{2} (4.6 km^{2})

Basin features
- Progression: Kern Run → Middle Creek → Penns Creek → Susquehanna River → Chesapeake Bay
- Tributaries
  - right: one unnamed tributary

Luphers Run is a tributary of Kern Run in Snyder County, Pennsylvania, in the United States. It is approximately 2.9 miles (4.7 km) long and flows through Beaver Township and Beavertown. The watershed of the stream has an area of 1.79 square miles (4.6 km^{2}). The stream is impacted by acid deposition, low pH, low dissolved oxygen nutrients, and organic enrichment. However, wild trout naturally reproduce in it. A vernal pool system is located nearby. Flooding has been known to occur along the stream.

== Course ==
Luphers Run begins on a large ridge in Beaver Township. It flows north-northwest for several tenths of a mile before receiving an unnamed tributary from Bear Spring on the right. The stream then continues flowing north-northwest for more than a mile before reaching the bottom of the ridge. At this point, it turns northwest for a few tenths of a mile and enters Beavertown. In Beavertown, the stream turns north-northwest for a few tenths of a mile, crossing US Route 522 and reaching its confluence with Kern Run.

Luphers Run joins Kern Run 1.34 miles (2.16 km) upstream of its mouth.

== Hydrology ==
Luphers Run is designated as an impaired waterbody. The cause of the impairment is nutrients and organic enrichment/low dissolved oxygen. The likely source of the impairment is municipal point source discharges. Additionally, the headwaters of the stream are impacted by acid deposition and low pH.

The Beavertown Municipal Authority is authorized to discharge sewage from the Beavertown Municipal Authority Sewage Plant into Luphers Run. Their permit to do so will expire in 2020.

== Geography and geology ==
The elevation near the mouth of Kern Run is 584 feet (178 m) above sea level. The elevation of the stream's source is 1,814 feet (553 m) above sea level.

== Watershed ==
The watershed of Luphers Run has an area of 1.79 square miles (4.6 km^{2}). The mouth of the stream is in the United States Geological Survey quadrangle of Beavertown. However its source is in the quadrangle of Beaver Springs.

The designated use for Luphers Run is aquatic life.

Flooding has been known to occur on Luphers Run in Beavertown and Beaver Township.

== History ==
Luphers Run was entered into the Geographic Names Information System on August 2, 1979. Its identifier in the Geographic Names Information System is 1180080.

Luphers Run has been used as a water supply for the borough of Beavertown.

== Biology ==
Wild trout naturally reproduce in Luphers Run from its headwaters downstream to its mouth.

A site known as the Beavertown Vernal Pools is located in the vicinity of Luphers Run. The vernal pools are listed on the Snyder County Natural Heritage Inventory.

== See also ==
- Wetzel Run, next tributary of Kern Run going downstream
- List of rivers of Pennsylvania
