= Wetzel Run =

Physical characteristics
- Source
  - location: large ridge in Beaver Township, Snyder County, Pennsylvania
  - elevation: 1,883 ft (574 m)
- Mouth
  - location: Kern Run in Beaver Township, Snyder County, Pennsylvania near Beavertown
  - coordinates: 40°45′36″N 77°10′24″W
  - elevation: 587 ft (179 m)
- Length: 4.3 mi (6.9 km)
- Basin size: 3.58 sq mi (9.3 km^{2})

Basin features
- Progression: Kern Run → Middle Creek → Penns Creek → Susquehanna River → Chesapeake Bay
- Tributaries
  - right: two unnamed tributaries

Wetzel Run is a tributary of Kern Run in Snyder County, Pennsylvania, in the United States. It is approximately 4.3 miles (6.9 km) long and flows through Beaver Township. The watershed of the stream has an area of 3.58 square miles (9.3 km^{2}). The stream is crossed by a bridge carrying US Route 522. Wild trout naturally reproduce in Wetzel Run.

== Course ==
Wetzel Run begins on a large ridge in Beaver Township. It flows northwest for several tenths of a mile before turning north-northeast for several tenths of a mile, receiving an unnamed tributary from the right. It then turns north-northwest for a few tenths of a mile before turning northeast for several tenths of a mile, receiving another unnamed tributary from the right and reaching the bottom of the ridge. The stream then turns north for a few tenths of a mile before turning northwest. After several tenths of a mile, the stream turns west and then north-northwest, crossing US Route 522 and approaching Thomas Ridge. Here, the stream disappears from the surface and turns west for several tenths of a mile before reaching its confluence with Kern Run.

Wetzel Run joins Kern Run 1.10 miles (1.77 km) upstream of its mouth.

== Hydrology, geography and geology ==
The elevation near the mouth of Wetzel Run is 587 feet (179 m) above sea level. The elevation of the stream's source is 1,883 feet (574 m) above sea level.

Beaverton Finishing Farm has or had a National Pollutant Discharge Elimination System permit for which the receiving stream was Wetzel Run.

== Watershed ==
The watershed of Wetzel Run has an area of 3.58 square miles (9.3 km^{2}). The mouth of the stream is in the United States Geological Survey quadrangle of Beavertown. However, its source is in the quadrangle of Beaver Springs. The stream's mouth is situated near Beavertown.

Flooding has been known to occur on Wetzel Run near the borough of Beavertown and in Beaver Township.

== History ==
Wetzel Run was entered into the Geographic Names Information System on August 2, 1979. Its identifier in the Geographic Names Information System is 1191196.

A bridge carrying US Route 522 over Wetzel Run was built in 1927. The bridge was a relatively narrow, single-span concrete bridge with a length of 24 feet (7.3 m). Eventually, the bridge deteriorated to become functionally obsolete and was replaced in 2012 for $456,000. The new bridge had two 12-foot (3.7 m) wide lanes and 8-foot (2.4 m) wide shoulders and is a precast concrete box culvert bridge. The new bridge opened for traffic on August 27, 2012 and is predicted to last at least 50 years.

== Biology ==
Wild trout naturally reproduce in Wetzel Run for 3.59 miles (5.78 km) of its length.

== See also ==
- Luphers Run, next tributary of Kern Run going upstream
- List of rivers of Pennsylvania
