= Dreese's Covered Bridge =

- U.S. National Register of Historic Places
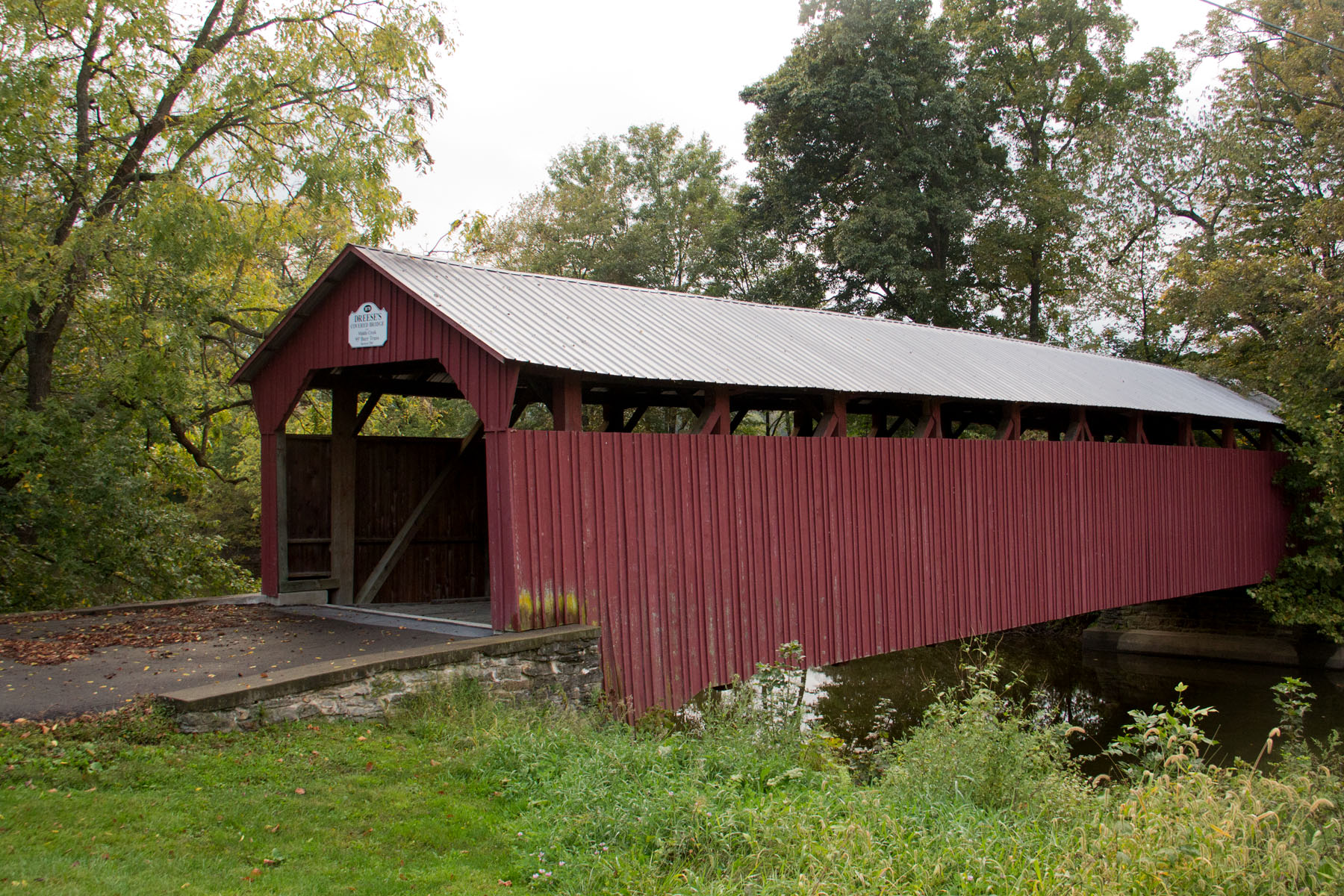

- Location within Pennsylvania Location within the United States
- Nearest city: Beaverton, Pennsylvania
- Coordinates: 40°46′30.65″N 77°8′42.41″W
- Built: 1870
- MPS: Covered Bridges of Juniata and Snyder Counties TR
- NRHP reference No.: 79002343
- Added to NRHP: August 10, 1979

The Dreese's Covered Bridge is located in Beaver Township, Snyder County, Pennsylvania. The wooden covered bridge is located northeast of Beavertown and spans Middle Creek. It was built around 1870 and rehabilitated in 2001. The road bypassed the bridge in 1979 and the bridge is open to pedestrian traffic only. It is designed as a covered burr arch-truss. Total length is 95 feet. This bridge was added to the National Register of Historic Places on August 10, 1979.
