= Midd-West High School =

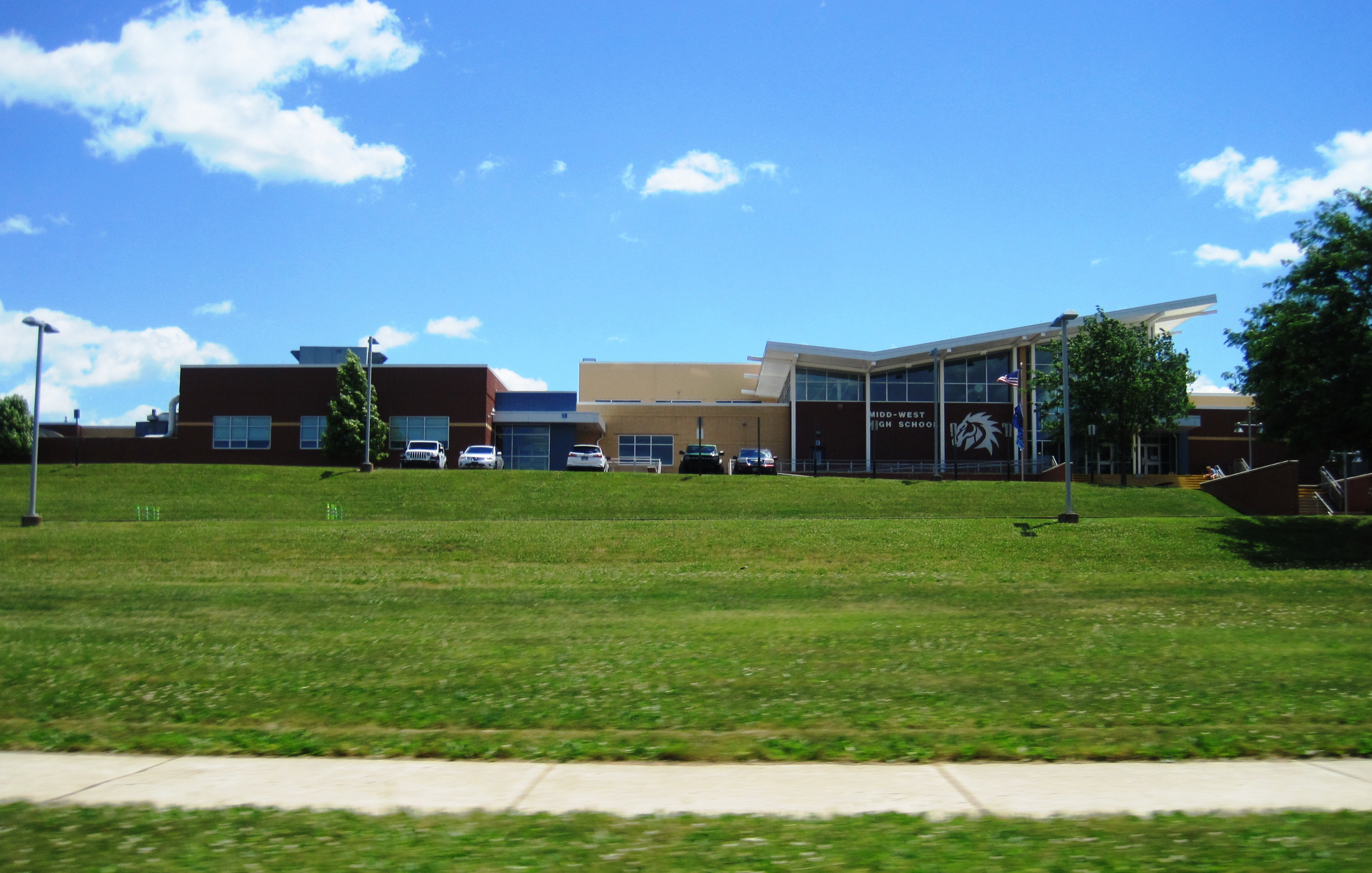

Location
- 540 East Main Street; Middleburg, Snyder County, Pennsylvania 17842-1295; United States; 40.788°N 77.036°W

Information
- Type: Public
- School district: Midd-West School District
- Principal: Dane Aucker
- Faculty: 60 teachers 2012
- Grades: 8th-12th
- Enrollment: 795 students (2013), 621 pupils (9th-12th) 2010
- Language: English
- Website: www.mwsd.cc/o/mwhs

Midd-West High School is a small, rural high school located at 540 E Main Street, Middleburg, Snyder County, Pennsylvania. It is the sole high school operated by Midd-West School District. In 2013, Midd-West High School's enrollment was 795 students in grades 8th through 12th. Students may choose to attend the SUN Area Technical Institute in New Berlin, Pennsylvania for training in the building trades, allied health services, automotive repairs, culinary arts as well as computer technology. Fees for attendance are paid by Midd-West School District. The Central Susquehanna Intermediate Unit IU16 provides the district with a wide variety of services like specialized education for disabled students and hearing, speech and visual disability services and professional development for staff and faculty.

The building was dedicated and opened on September 19–20, 1925, by then Pennsylvania Governor Gifford Pinchot. On September 19, 2025, the High school celebrated its 100 anniversary.

== Extracurriculars ==
The Midd-West School District offers students a wide variety of clubs, activities and an extensive sports program.

=== Sports ===
MWSD's mascot is the mustang. School colors are Carolina blue and dull silver. Just before the merger of the two high schools, high school students were asked to vote on a new mascot and school colors to replace the old West Snyder HS Mounties (colors: red and white) and Middleburg HS Middies (colors: blue and gold). The district funds:

Boys

- Baseball - AAAA
- Basketball - AAAA
- Football - AAA
- Bowling - AAAAAA
- Cross country - AA
- Golf - AA
- Soccer - AA
- Track and field - AA
- Wrestling - AA

Girls

- Basketball - AAAA
- Bowling - AAAAAA
- Cheer - AAAAA
- Cross country - AA
- Field hockey - A
- Lacrosse - AA
- Soccer - AA
- Softball - AAAA
- Track and field - AA

- According to PIAA directory July 2012

Midd-West School District is a member of the Pennsylvania Heartland Athletic Conference. Midd-West School District participates under the rules and guidelines of the Pennsylvania Interscholastic Athletic Association. The Pennsylvania Heartland Athletic Conference is a voluntary association of 25 PIAA High Schools within the central Pennsylvania region.
