= SUN Area Technical Institute =

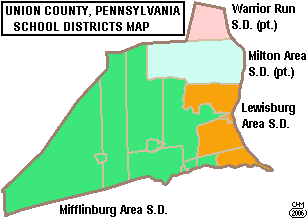

Location
- 815 Market St. New Berlin, Union County, Pennsylvania 17855; United States

Information
- Type: Public
- School board: 5 elected members
- Principal: Judy Sharer
- Faculty: 40
- Grades: 11-12 Grade, Adults
- Enrollment: 252 pupils (2014) Shikellamy SD 63 pupils Midd-West SD 59 pupils Selinsgrove Area SD 46 pupils Lewisburg Area SD 25 pupils Mifflinburg Area SD 68 pupils

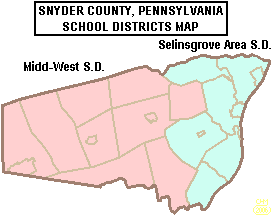
School District region in Snyder County

SUN Area Technical Institute is a public, vocational education institution located in New Berlin, Pennsylvania. SUN Area Technical Institute (often shortened to SUN Tech) provides technical education to high school students from five public school districts in a three county region (Snyder County, Union County and Northumberland County), including Lewisburg Area School District, Mifflinburg Area School District, Midd-West School District, Selinsgrove Area School District and Shikellamy School District. SUN Area Technical Institute also provides day and evening adult education for a fee charged to the students.

In 2014, enrollment was reported as 252 pupils in 11th and 12th grades.

The Central Susquehanna Intermediate Unit IU16 provides the School with a wide variety of services like specialized education for disabled students and hearing, speech and visual disability services and professional development for staff and faculty.

SUN Area Technical Institute is governed by the SUN Area Technical Institute Joint Operating Committee which is composed of one school board member from each member school district and the Superintendent of Record for the year. On an annually rotating basis, a superintendent from one of the five sending districts also oversees SUN Tech. The school's foundation called SUN Area Career & Technology Education Foundation is overseen by a seven-member board made up of its management team, a local school board representative and several local business owners.

== History ==
SUN Area Vocational-Technical School was first conceived in the early 1960s as a solution to the shortage of skilled labor in central Pennsylvania. Vocational training was a widely accepted solution, however questions over district participation and the location of the new school prevented it from opening until 20 local districts accepted the Articles of Agreement in 1967.

SUN Area Vocational-Technical School opened in the fall of 1967 at its first location on Market St. in Sunbury, Pennsylvania. The school originally served students from Lewsiburg, Mifflinburg, Adams Township, Beavertown, Spring Township, Shikellamy, Monroe Township, Chapman Township, Jackson Township, Freeburg, Selinsgrove, Penn Township, Union Township, Shamokin Dam, Middlecreek, Center, Middleburg, Franklin, West Perry, and Perry.

On March 3, 1968, SUN Area Vocational-Technical School was authorized to purchase property and construct a new building in New Berlin, PA. Throughout the subsequent 4 decades many district mergers occurred. In 1987, SUN Area Vocational-Technical School was shortened to SUN Area Technical School. In 1995, it was renamed SUN Area Career and Technology Center, and once again in 2009 the school was renamed SUN Area Technical Institute.

In 2013, SUN Area Technical Institute purchased the Playworld Systems building on Cherry St. in New Berlin, PA. This location was named the SUN Tech West Campus and is currently being remodeled for future expansion.

== Program offerings ==
SUN Tech offers programs in:

- Criminal Justice
- Computer and Networking Technology
- Electronics Technology
- Health Professions
- Drafting CAD Technology
- Advertising Art and Design
- Dental Health Technology
- Cosmetology
- Food Service
- Precision Machining
- Welding
- Electrical Systems Technology
- HVAC and Plumbing
- Masonry
- Carpentry
- Wood Products Manufacturing
- Automotive Technology
- Diesel Truck Technology
- Collision Repair Technology

In 2014, the school added CDL training (Commercial Drivers License). It is a collaboration with Sage Truck Driving Schools. The program is open to students 18 years old and above with it also open to the public in the evening.

== SOAR program ==
SUN Tech offers the state's SOAR program to its students. SOAR is a Pennsylvania Department of Education program that facilitates a student's progress from high school to college by allowing them to earn college credit while still in high school. The school works with Pennsylvania College of Technology, Luzerne County Community College and Bloomsburg University of Pennsylvania to permit students to earn college credits while remaining enrolled in high school.

=== ACE ===
SUN Area Technical Institute students have access to Bloomsburg University's Summer College and Advanced College Experience (ACE) during the summer of their sophomore, junior and senior years (after high school graduation). Tuition is deeply discounted to 75% of the regular student rate. Successful students earn college credits that can be readily transferred to other Pennsylvania public colleges and universities through the Pennsylvania Transfer and Articulation Center (PA TRAC) system.

=== Penn NOW program ===
In 2014, SUN Area Technical Institute offered several dual enrollment courses in conjunction with Pennsylvania College of Technology. Penn College NOW classes are taught by approved High School teachers at the high school. Penn College NOW is partially funded by the Carl D. Perkins Career and Technical Education Improvement Act of 2006 (Public Law 109–270) through the Pennsylvania Department of Education, by the support of Pennsylvania companies through the Educational Improvement Tax Credit program managed by the Pennsylvania Department of Community and Economic Development and by Pennsylvania College of Technology.
