= Gross Covered Bridge =

Bridge in Pennsylvania, United States

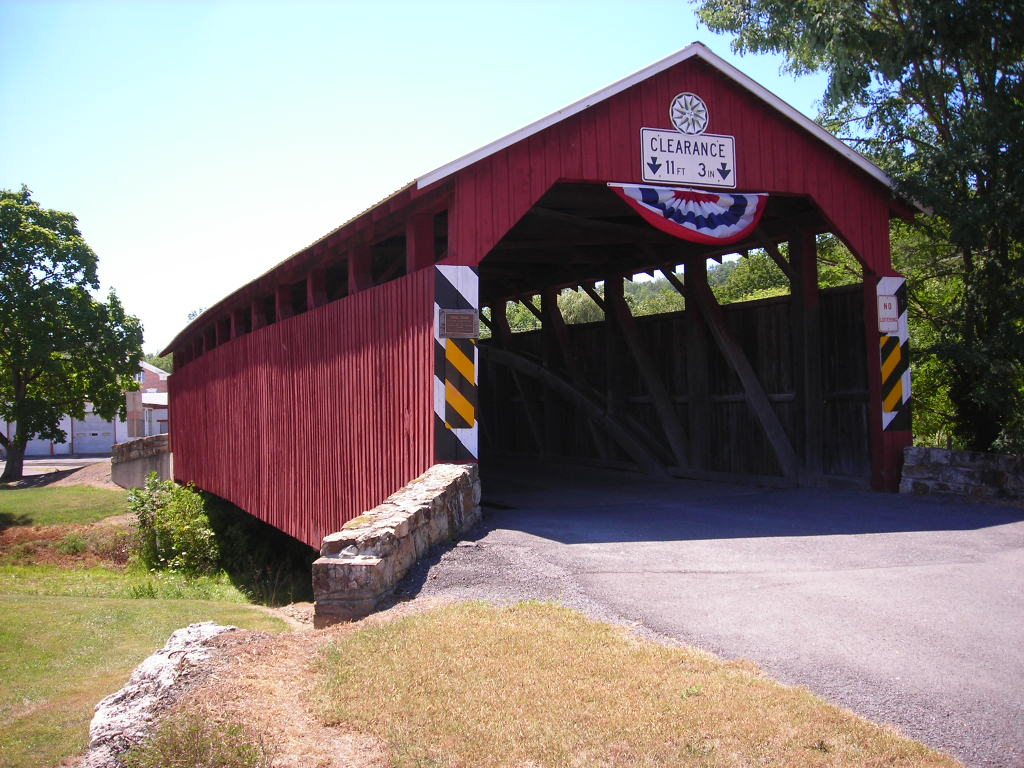
- Coordinates: 40°44′49″N 77°12′42.5″W
- Crosses: tributary of Middle Creek
- Locale: Spring, Snyder, Pennsylvania, United States
- Other name(s): Klinepeter's, Overflow, Beaver Springs
- Maintained by: Spring Township
- NBI Number: 547211181200060

Characteristics
- Total length: 100 ft (30 m)
- Width: 17 ft (5.2 m)
- Height: 11.25 ft (3.43 m)
- Load limit: 5 short tons (4.5 t)

History
- Constructed by: Davis Kitch
- Built: 1871
- Gross Covered Bridge
- U.S. National Register of Historic Places
- MPS: Covered Bridges of Juniata and Snyder Counties TR
- NRHP reference No.: 77001194
- Added to NRHP: August 29, 1977

Location
- Interactive map of Gross Covered Bridge

The Gross Covered Bridge is 100-foot (30 m) Burr Arch truss covered bridge in the census-designated place of Beaver Springs, Spring Township in Snyder County, Pennsylvania. It was listed on the National Register of Historic Places on August 29, 1997, and was documented by the Historic American Engineering Record (HAER) in 1981.

== History ==
The covered bridge was built in 1871 and originally spanned Middle Creek north of Beaver Springs on Township Route 574. It was moved in 1982 to its present location on Township Route 427 in Beaver Springs, spanning a run-off channel that flows into Middle Creek. The bridge was moved when a dam and resulting reservoir were created on the stream originally spanned by the bridge.

== See also ==
- List of bridges documented by the Historic American Engineering Record in Pennsylvania
- List of bridges on the National Register of Historic Places in Pennsylvania
- National Register of Historic Places listings in Snyder County, Pennsylvania
