= Walker Lake =

Several lakes are known as Walker Lake:

== Canada ==
- Lake Walker in Quebec, Canada, the largest (by depth) lake in the province.

== United States ==
- Walker Lake (Haines, Alaska)
- Walker Lake (Northwest Arctic, Alaska)
- Walker Lake (Prince of Wales-Outer Ketchikan CA, Alaska)
- Walker Lake (Calhoun County, Arkansas)
- Walker Lake (Idaho)
- Lake Walker (Gaithersburg, Maryland) (39°9′10″N 77°12′35″W)
- Walker Lake (Nevada)
  - Walker Lake, Nevada, a community along the lake
- Walker Lake (Pennsylvania)
- Mountain Meadows Reservoir, also known as Walker Lake
