= Ira Middleswarth & Son, Inc. =

American potato chip manufacturer

- Company type: Privately held company
- Founded: 1942 in Beavertown, Pennsylvania
- Founder: Bob Middleswarth
- Headquarters: Middleburg, Pennsylvania
- Area served: Pennsylvania, New York, New Jersey and Maryland
- Key people: David Middleswarth (president); Jeff Goff (vice president)
- Website: www.middleswarthchips.com

Ira Middleswarth & Son, Inc., more commonly referred to as Middleswarth Potato Chips, is an American potato chip manufacturer.

== History ==
Ira Middleswarth & Son, Inc. was founded in 1942 by Bob Middleswarth. That same year the company began producing potato chips using a single kettle in a small two-room building on the property of Middleswarth's family in Beavertown, Snyder County, Pennsylvania. In 1959 the company expanded to a larger facility. That same year the company began producing over 300 lbs of chips an hour with the help of its 20 employees. In 1961 they moved once again to their current location in Middleburg, Pennsylvania, when Bob Middleswarth was named president. After Bob's retirement in 2002 and subsequent death, his son David Middleswarth became company president.

== Products ==
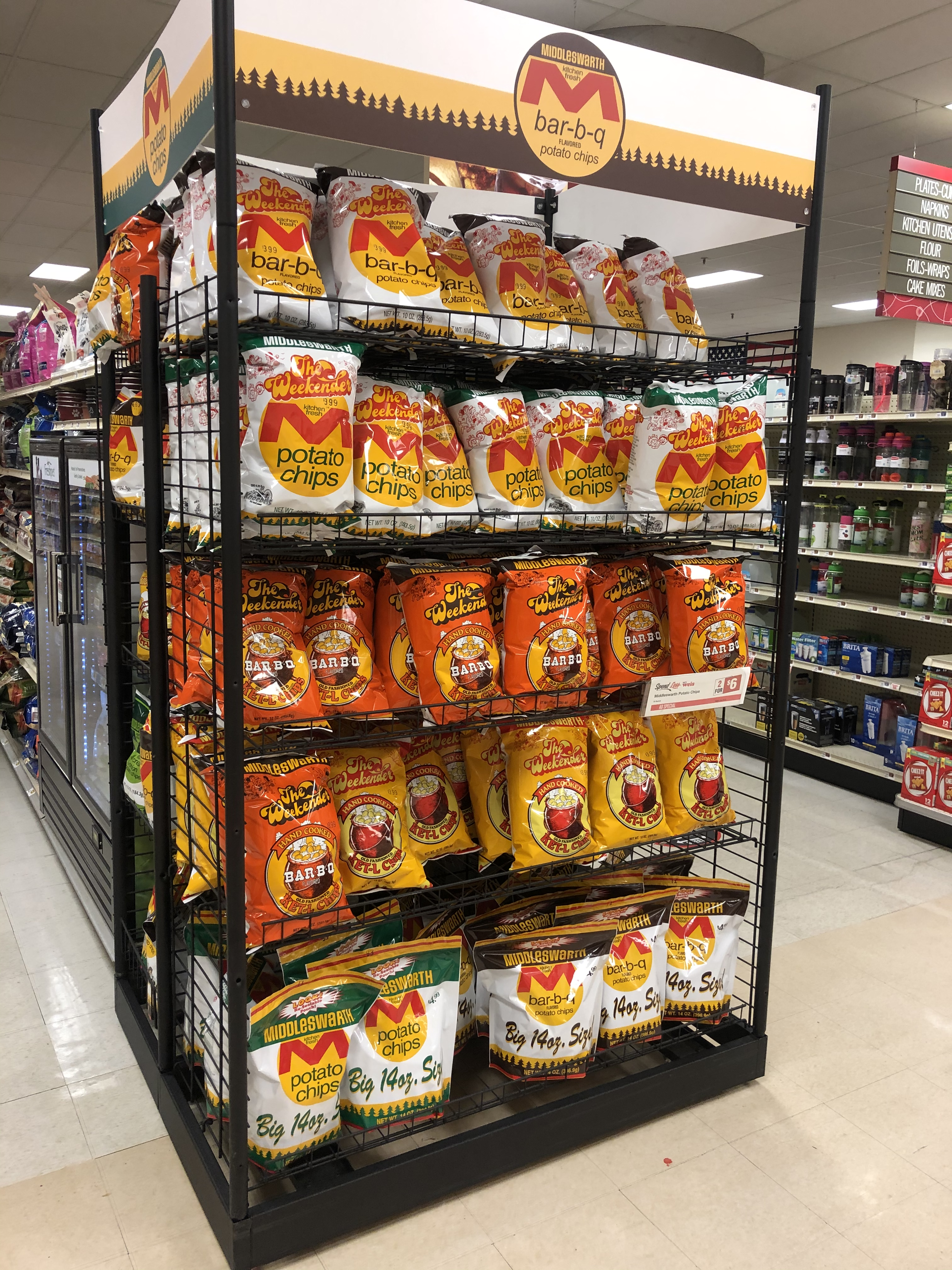
A Middleswarth chips display at a store in Loyalsock Township, Pennsylvania

As of August 2020 Middleswarth sells the following potato chip flavors:

- Regular
- Bar-B-Q
- Sour cream & onion
- Sea salt & vinegar
- Jalapeno
- Kettle cooked
- Kettle cooked Bar-B-Q
- Kettle cooked Sour cream & onion
- Unsalted

=== List of company presidents ===
- Bob & Lottie Middleswarth (1942–1953)
- Ira Middleswarth (1953–1961)
- Bob Middleswarth (1961–2002)
- David Middleswarth (2002–present)

== In popular culture ==
In 2014 a product placement company reached out to Middleswarth for product to be used in upcoming projects. Middleswarth was later told a bag of their chips was to be featured in the upcoming Rocky film series release, Creed. However, the scene featuring the chips was later scrapped and didn't make it into the film.

In 2015 a bag of Middleswarth Bar-B-Q Potato Chips was featured multiple times in the background shot in ABC's hit comedy Modern Family.

== See also ==
- List of Pennsylvania companies
