= Walker Lake (Pennsylvania) =

Lake of the United States of America

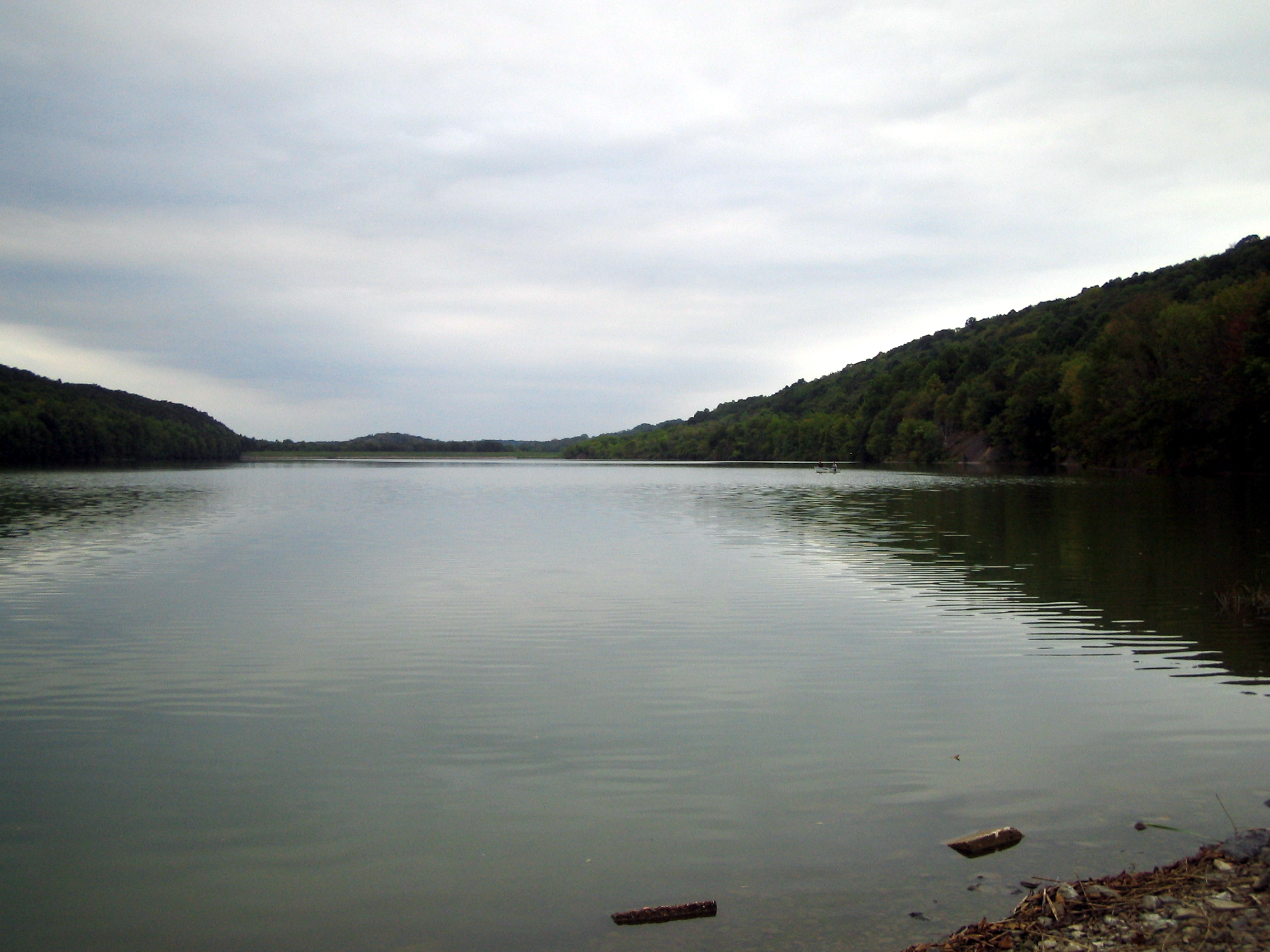

- Location within Pennsylvania Location within the United States
- Location: Adams Township, Snyder County, Pennsylvania
- Coordinates: 40°48′14″N 77°10′45″W
- Primary inflows: North Branch Middle Creek
- Primary outflows: North Branch Middle Creek
- Catchment area: 19 sq mi (49 km^{2})
- Basin countries: United States
- Surface area: 239 acres (97 ha)
- Average depth: 13.8 ft (4.2 m)
- Max. depth: 32 ft (9.8 m)
- Water volume: 3,317 acre⋅ft (4,091,000 m^{3})
- Surface elevation: 633 ft (193 m)

Clarence F. Walker Lake is a 239-acre (0.97 km²) reservoir, formed by a dam and used for flood control and recreation. It is located in Adams Township, Snyder County, Pennsylvania near the town of Troxelville. The lake and shoreline are owned and managed by the Pennsylvania Fish and Boat Commission (PFBC) for recreational fishing and boating. Fish species present include northern pike, largemouth bass, walleye, black crappie, and bluegill.

Walker Lake is located on the North Branch Middle Creek, which is a tributary to Middle Creek within the Susquehanna River basin. North Branch Middle Creek was impounded in 1970 creating the 239 acre (0.97 km²) lake, which drains a 19 mi² (49 km²) watershed consisting primarily of forested (57%) and agricultural (39%) areas. Walker Lake has a maximum depth of 32 feet (9.8 m) with a mean depth of 13.8 feet (4.2 m) with an overall volume of 3,317 acre-feet (4,091,000 m^{3}) of water.
