= John Mobley =

American football player (born 1973)

No. 51
- Position: Linebacker

Personal information
- Born: October 10, 1973 (age 53); Chester, Pennsylvania, U.S.
- Listed height: 6 ft 1 in (1.85 m)
- Listed weight: 236 lb (107 kg)

Career information
- High school: Chichester (Boothwyn, Pennsylvania)
- College: Kutztown (PA)
- NFL draft: 1996: 1st round, 15th overall pick

Career history
- Denver Broncos (1996–2003)

Awards and highlights
- 2× Super Bowl champion (XXXII, XXXIII); First-team All-Pro (1997); PFWA All-Rookie Team (1996)

Career NFL statistics
- Tackles: 621
- Sacks: 10.5
- Forced fumbles: 5
- Fumble recoveries: 7
- Interceptions: 5
- Defensive touchdowns: 1
- Stats at Pro Football Reference

John Ulysses Mobley (born October 10, 1973) is an American former professional football player who was a linebacker for eight seasons with the Denver Broncos of the National Football League (NFL) from 1996 to 2003.

He is the cousin of former NBA player Cuttino Mobley.

== Biography ==
One of nine children born to parents, Lee and Vera, who divorced when he was thirteen years old, Mobley lived with his father until the age of sixteen. After his father suffered a stroke, Mobley moved in with his mother, who demanded he leave high school to help support his family. Mobley spent a year living on the street in an old car before a friend's family took him in.

Lacking the academic credentials for a Division I school, Mobley went on to play college football for Kutztown University in 1991. Mobley made the starting lineup as a freshman and recorded nine tackles and a sack in his first college game, and earned an honorable mention on the All-American team as a sophomore. Mobley's college career came to a sudden halt in 1993, however, when coach Barry Fetterman was fired as a result of an NCAA investigation into academic violations at the school. The team's new coach, Al Leonzi, carried out his own investigation and ended up declaring Mobley ineligible for the upcoming season.

Mobley subsequently resolved his academic status, and returned for the 1994 and 1995 seasons, earning first-team AP Little All-American selections as a junior and senior and a Division II invitation to the Senior Bowl in Mobile, Alabama. He was drafted in the first round of the 1996 NFL draft by the Denver Broncos, making him the highest drafted player in the history of the Pennsylvania State Athletic Conference, and just the third player from Kutztown ever to be drafted.

Mobley's best season occurred in 1997. He had 132 tackles and four sacks and was an All-Pro that season; however, he missed most of the 1999 season because of an injury.

Mobley suffered a bruised spinal column during the 2003 season after colliding with his teammate Kelly Herndon in a game against the Baltimore Ravens. The injury was severe enough that the Broncos cut him before the 2004 season in order to allow him time for recovery. He later re-signed with the Broncos and retired because of the injury.

Mobley served seven days in prison for a DUI conviction in 2004 after being pulled over and arrested on December 28, 2002. He was found guilty by a jury in April 2004 and was sentenced to 365 days behind bars, but the judge in the case later reduced it to seven days.

In Super Bowl XXXII, Mobley deflected a Brett Favre pass on 4th and 6 from the 31-yard-line with just over 30 seconds left in the game. The deflection sealed a 31–24 victory for the Broncos and ended the NFC's run of 13 straight wins over the AFC in Super Bowl competition. In the 1998 AFC Championship game, Mobley recovered a Keith Byars fumble on the Broncos 18-yard-line in the second quarter to stop a scoring drive.

During his career, Mobley played in 105 career games, starting 102 of them, including two Super Bowls, during which he made 608 career tackles, 10.5 quarterback sacks, and five interceptions for 45 yards and a touchdown.

== NFL career statistics ==
Legend
	Won the Super Bowl
	Led the league
**Bold**	Career high

=== Regular season ===
Year	Team	Games		Tackles				Interceptions				Fumbles			
Year	Team	GP	GS	Comb	Solo	Ast	Sck	Int	Yds	TD	Lng	FF	FR	Yds	TD
1996	DEN	16	16	61	49	12	1.5	**1**	8	0	8	0	0	0	0
1997	DEN	16	16	**132**	**96**	**36**	**4.0**	**1**	13	**1**	13	**2**	1	0	0
1998	DEN	16	15	112	93	19	1.0	**1**	-2	0	-2	0	1	0	0
1999	DEN	2	2	10	7	3	0.0	0	0	0	0	0	0	0	0
2000	DEN	15	14	87	70	17	2.0	**1**	9	0	9	**2**	0	0	0
2001	DEN	16	16	93	80	13	1.0	**1**	**17**	0	**17**	1	**3**	**8**	0
2002	DEN	16	16	101	74	27	1.0	0	0	0	0	0	2	1	0
2003	DEN	8	7	25	22	3	0.0	0	0	0	0	0	0	0	0
		105	102	621	491	130	10.5	5	45	1	17	5	7	9	0

=== Playoffs ===
Year	Team	Games		Tackles				Interceptions				Fumbles			
Year	Team	GP	GS	Comb	Solo	Ast	Sck	Int	Yds	TD	Lng	FF	FR	Yds	TD
1996	DEN	1	1	7	6	1	0.0	0	0	0	0	0	0	0	0
1997	DEN	4	4	**19**	**17**	**2**	0.0	0	0	0	0	0	0	0	0
1998	DEN	3	3	6	5	1	**1.0**	0	0	0	0	0	**1**	0	0
2000	DEN	1	1	6	6	0	0.0	0	0	0	0	0	0	0	0
		9	9	38	34	4	1.0	0	0	0	0	0	1	0	0
