= Central Susquehanna Intermediate Unit =

School district in Pennsylvania

Coordinates: 40.97014°N 76.84991°W

Central Susquehanna Intermediate Unit #16 (CSIU), located in the Milton Industrial Park, Milton, Pennsylvania, was created by the Pennsylvania General Assembly in 1971 as one of 29 Intermediate Units in the commonwealth. Intermediate units serve a given geographic area's educational needs and function as a step of organization above that of a public school district, but below that of the Pennsylvania Department of Education. The state's goal is for IU's to meet student and community needs in a cost-effective manner by providing services best offered on a regional basis such as special education, technical education, services to public and nonpublic schools. IN 2016-17 the CSIU16 budget is $76.7 million for programs and services and $1,073,846 General operating budget.

Intermediate Units are governed by a board of directors, each member is also a member of a local school board from the IUs region. Board members are elected by school directors of all the region's school districts for three-year terms that begin July 1. Officers of the intermediate unit's board are selected by members of the IU board. IU board members have a separate fiduciary responsibility to the IU and are not intended to be representatives of their home districts. They are funded by school districts, state funding and federal program specific funding and grants. IUs do not have the power to tax. Annual budgets of the intermediate unit must be approved by a majority of the school boards in the districts it serves.

CSIU's primary service area consists of Columbia, Montour, Northumberland, Snyder and Union counties in central Pennsylvania, which includes 17 public school districts, three technical schools and more than 70 nonpublic schools. CSIU also markets a wide range of products and services to education and other public agencies throughout and outside Pennsylvania.

== Public Schools Served ==
- Benton Area School District
- Berwick Area School District
- Bloomsburg Area School District
- Central Columbia School District
- Danville Area School District
- Lewisburg Area School District
- Line Mountain School District
- Midd-West School District
- Mifflinburg Area School District
- Millville Area School District
- Milton Area School District
- Mount Carmel Area School District
- Selinsgrove Area School District
- Shamokin Area School District
- Shikellamy School District
- Southern Columbia Area School District
- Warrior Run School District
- SusQ Cyber Charter School
- Career and Technology Schools
  - Columbia-Montour Area Vocational-Technical School
  - Northumberland Co. Career & Technology Center
  - SUN Area Technical Institute

== Non Public Schools Served ==
- Columbia County Christian - Bloomsburg
- Gospel Christian Academy - Selinsgrove
- Greenwood Friends School - Millville
- Heritage Christian Academy - Berwick
- Hillside Christian Academy - Mifflinburg
- Holy Family Consolidated School - Berwick
- Maranatha Christian School - Watsontown
- Meadowbrook Christian School - Milton
- Meadowview Christian Academy - Paxinos
- Northumberland Christian School - Northumberland
- Our Lady of Lourdes Regional School - Coal Township
- Penn View Christian Academy - Penns Creek
- St. Columba School - Bloomsburg
- St. Cyril Preschool and Kindergarten - Danville
- St. Joseph School - Danville
- Sunbury Christian Academy - Northumberland
- Transfiguration of Our Lord School - Shamokin
- Watsontown Christian Academy - Watsontown

data taken from CSIU16 Service Directory 2009–10.

== CSIU 16 Services ==
- Educational programs for CSIU region schools and communities
- Professional development and school improvement programs
- Computer software and services for school districts and other public agencies
- Management of Pennsylvania Trust, serving nine regional Pennsylvania trusts with 90 school employers and 30,000 staff
- Pennsylvania Education Joint Purchasing Council, a consortium-buying program serving 240 members in five states, which saves schools and other public entities $6.3 million per year in purchases
- PEPPM, a technology bidding and purchasing program that allows schools, libraries, government entities and non-profit agencies to save money on technology purchases
- Statewide prevention and intervention initiatives
- Cyber Charter School - grades 9-12th
- State mandated preemployment finger printing
- Gifted Education Networking Services
- Education services to Incarcerated Youth
- Migrant Education Support
- Northumberland Area Early Head Start and Head Start federally funded preschool programs
- Educator Effectiveness Project
