= Barry Fetterman =

American football player and coach

Biographical details
- Born: c. 1940; East Greenville, Pennsylvania, U.S.
- Died: July 26, 1998; Center Valley, Pennsylvania, U.S.

Playing career
- 1959–1961: Delaware

Coaching career (HC unless noted)
- 1963–1964: Boyertown HS (PA) (assistant)
- 1965–1966: Selinsgrove HS (PA)
- 1967: Susquehanna (assistant)
- 1968–1971: Lehigh (assistant)
- 1972–1975: Liberty HS (PA)
- 1977–1987: Lehigh (OC)
- 1988–1992: Kutztown
- 1994–1997: Lehigh (WR)

Head coaching record
- Overall: 18–32–1 (college)

Barry J. Fetterman (c. 1940 – July 26, 1998) was an American football coach. He was the head coach at Kutztown University of Pennsylvania from 1988 to 1992, where he accumulated a record of 18–32–1.

Prior to that, Fetterman served as a head coach at several Pennsylvania high schools and as an assistant at Susquehanna University and Lehigh University. He was a member of the 1977 Lehigh Engineers football team that won the NCAA Division II Football Championship.

== Head coaching record ==
=== College ===
Year	Team	Overall	Conference	Standing	Bowl/playoffs
Kutztown Golden Bears (Pennsylvania State Athletic Conference) (1988–1992)
1988	Kutztown	2–8	0–6	7th (East)	
1989	Kutztown	1–9	1–5	7th (East)	
1990	Kutztown	5–6	2–3	T–4th (East)	
1991	Kutztown	6–4	4–2	T–2nd (East)	
1992	Kutztown	4–5–1	2–4	5th (East)	
Kutztown:		18–32–1	9–20		
Total:		18–32–1			
