= Troxelville, Pennsylvania =

Unincorporated community in Pennsylvania, US

Troxelville
- Census-designated place
- Location within the U.S. state of Pennsylvania Troxelville (the United States)
- Coordinates: 40°48′27″N 77°12′22″W
- Country: United States
- State: Pennsylvania
- County: Snyder

Area
  - Total: 0.93 sq mi (2.4 km^{2})
  - Land: 0.93 sq mi (2.4 km^{2})

Population (2000)
  - Total: 192
  - Density: 210/sq mi (80/km^{2})
- Time zone: UTC-5 (Eastern (EST))
  - Summer (DST): UTC-4 (EDT)
- GNIS feature ID: 2390407

Troxelville is a census-designated place (CDP) in Adams Township, Snyder County, Pennsylvania, United States. The population was 192 at the 2000 census.

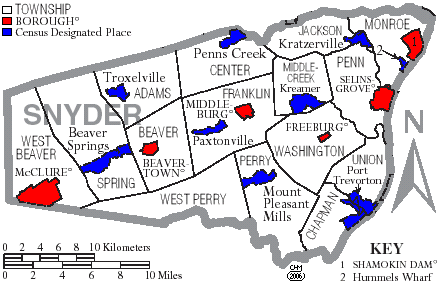
Map of Snyder County, Pennsylvania with Municipal Labels showing Boroughs (red), Townships (white), and Census-designated places (blue).

== Geography ==
Troxelville is located near Walker Lake.

According to the United States Census Bureau, the CDP has a total area of 0.9 square miles (2.3 km^{2}), all land.

== Demographics ==
As of the census of 2000, there were 192 people, 74 households, and 60 families residing in the CDP. The population density was 209.1 inhabitants per square mile (80.7/km^{2}). There were 80 housing units at an average density of 87.1 per square mile (33.6/km^{2}). The racial makeup of the CDP was 100.00% White.

There were 74 households, out of which 35.1% had children under the age of 18 living with them, 63.5% were married couples living together, 10.8% had a female householder with no husband present, and 18.9% were non-families. 17.6% of all households were made up of individuals, and 8.1% had someone living alone who was 65 years of age or older. The average household size was 2.59 and the average family size was 2.87.

In the CDP, the population was spread out, with 26.0% under the age of 18, 5.7% from 18 to 24, 30.7% from 25 to 44, 25.5% from 45 to 64, and 12.0% who were 65 years of age or older. The median age was 35 years. For every 100 females, there were 97.9 males. For every 100 females age 18 and over, there were 97.2 males.

The median income for a household in the CDP was $26,250, and the median income for a family was $28,750. Males had a median income of $26,406 versus $19,688 for females. The per capita income for the CDP was $12,333. About 4.8% of families and 7.0% of the population were below the poverty line, including 14.0% of those under the age of eighteen and none of those 65 or over.

== Notable person ==
Troxelville was the home to Euell Gibbons, an author and television personality popular in the 1960s and 1970s. Gibbons authored at least eight foraging guides, including Stalking the Wild Asparagus, promoted natural diets, and made guest appearances on late-night talk shows and variety shows. The Gibbons residence was located on the road leading from Troxelville to the Snyder-Middleswarth State Park, and was given the name "It Wonders Me."
