= West Beaver Township, Pennsylvania =

Township in Pennsylvania, United States

Coordinates: 40°47′00″N 77°19′59″W

- Township
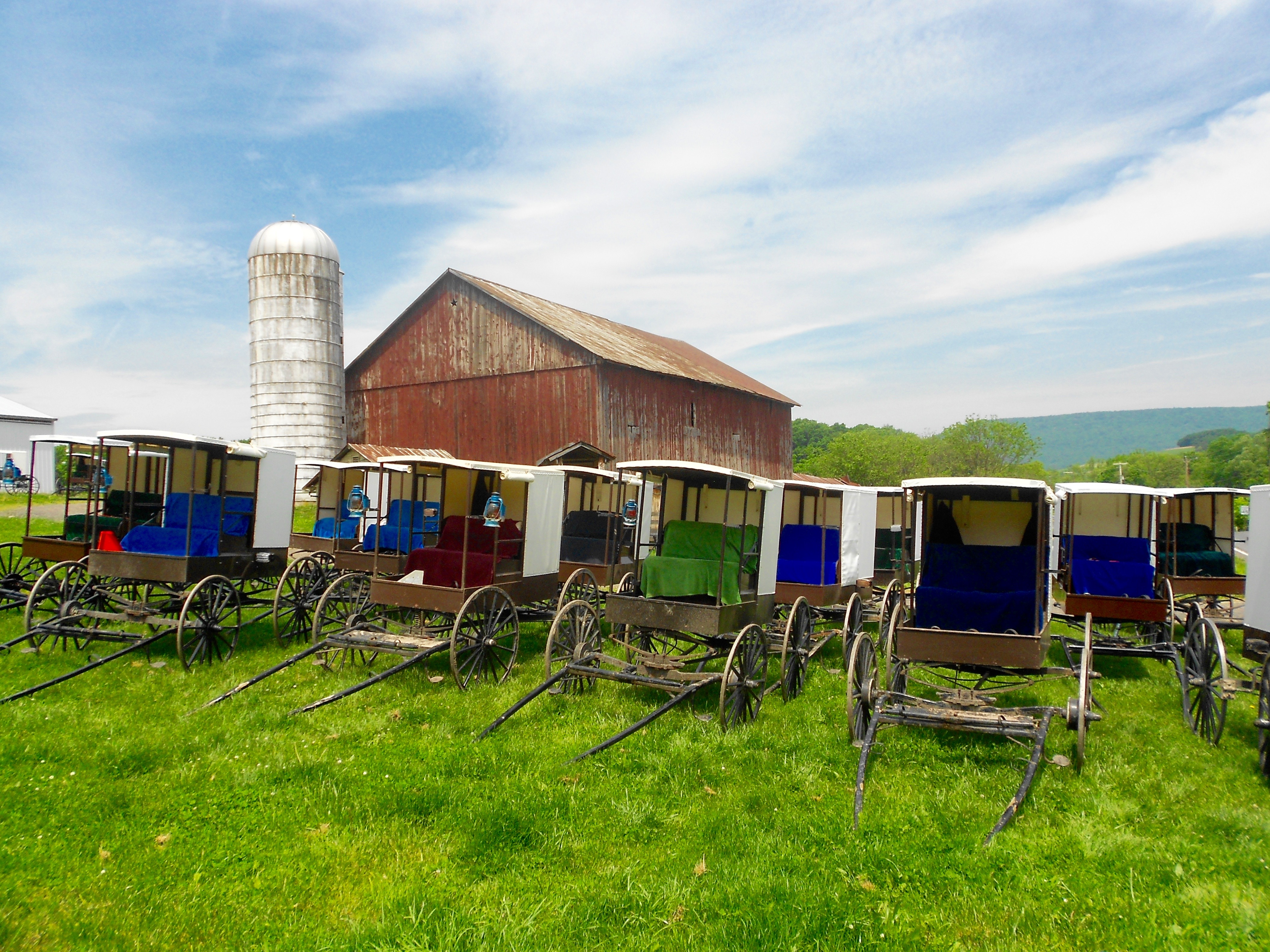
- White-topped buggies parked on a hill on a Sunday morning

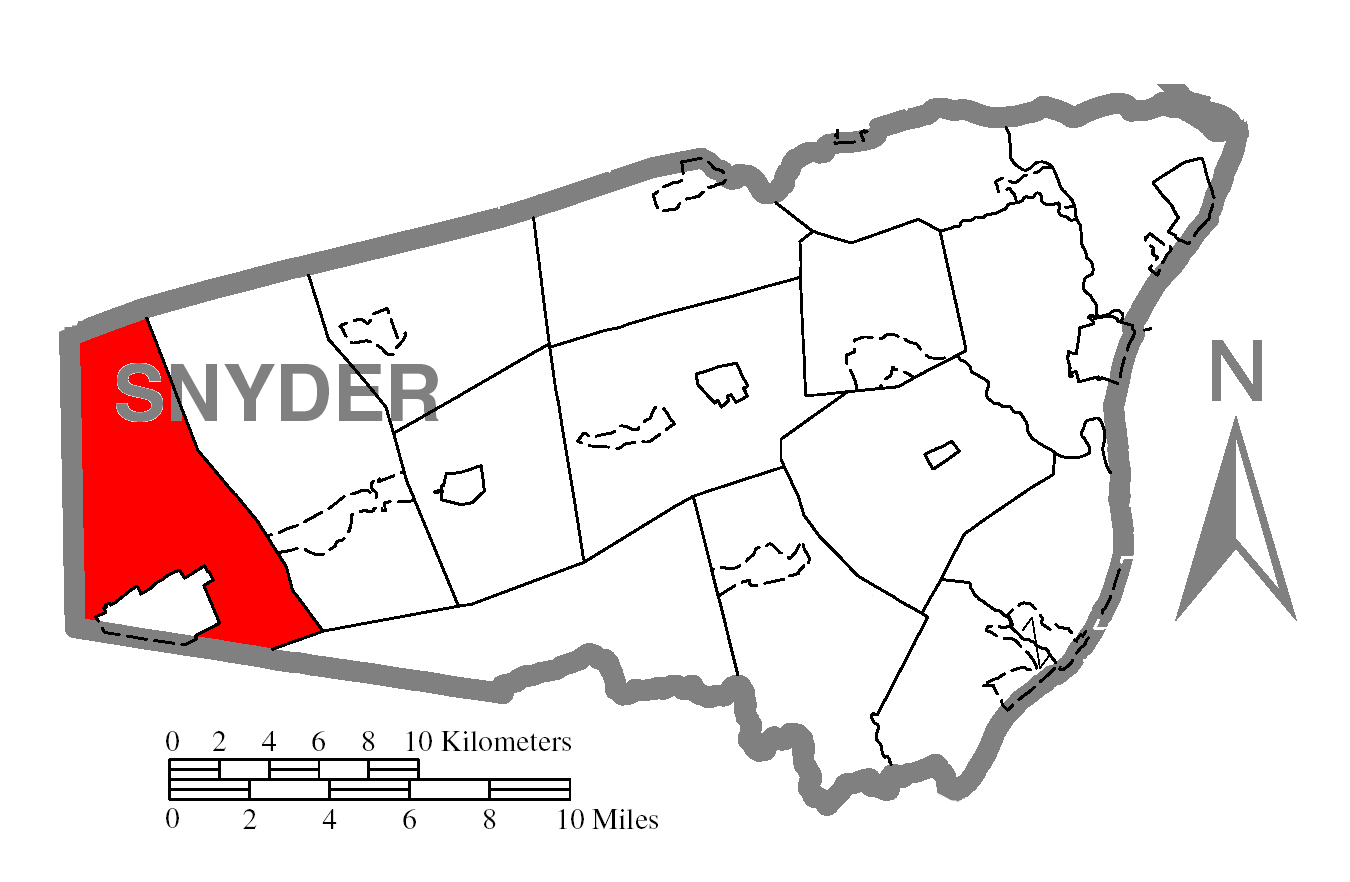
- Map of Snyder County, Pennsylvania highlighting West Beaver Township

- Map of Snyder County, Pennsylvania
- Country: United States
- State: Pennsylvania
- County: Snyder
- Incorporated: 1843

Area
  - Total: 27.56 sq mi (71.37 km^{2})
  - Land: 27.48 sq mi (71.17 km^{2})
  - Water: 0.077 sq mi (0.20 km^{2})

Population (2020)
  - Total: 1,129 ▲
  - Estimate (2022): 1,127
  - Density: 40.2/sq mi (15.51/km^{2})
- Time zone: UTC-5 (Eastern (EST))
  - Summer (DST): UTC-4 (EDT)
- Area code: 570
- FIPS code: 42-109-82464

West Beaver Township is a township in Snyder County, Pennsylvania, United States. The population was 1,129 at the 2020 census.

== Geography ==
According to the United States Census Bureau, the township has a total area of 27.9 square miles (72.3 km^{2}), all land.

West Beaver Township is bordered by Union County to the north, Spring Township to the east, West Perry Township and Juniata County to the south and Mifflin County to the west.

The borough of McClure is surrounded on three sides by West Beaver Township in the southwestern corner of the township.

== Demographics ==
Historical population
Census	Pop.	Note	%±
2010	1,110		—
2020	1,129		1.7%
2022 (est.)	1,127		−0.2%
U.S. Decennial Census

As of the census of 2000, there were 1,124 people, 384 households, and 306 families residing in the township. The population density was 40.2 inhabitants per square mile (15.5/km^{2}). There were 469 housing units at an average density of 16.8/sq mi (6.5/km^{2}). The racial makeup of the township was 99.82% White, 0.09% Asian, and 0.09% from two or more races. Hispanic or Latino of any race were 0.36% of the population.

There were 384 households, out of which 38.8% had children under the age of 18 living with them, 71.9% were married couples living together, 3.9% had a female householder with no husband present, and 20.3% were non-families. 16.4% of all households were made up of individuals, and 6.8% had someone living alone who was 65 years of age or older. The average household size was 2.93 and the average family size was 3.31.

In the township the population was spread out, with 30.0% under the age of 18, 6.5% from 18 to 24, 30.2% from 25 to 44, 22.5% from 45 to 64, and 10.9% who were 65 years of age or older. The median age was 35 years. For every 100 females, there were 101.1 males. For every 100 females age 18 and over, there were 98.7 males.

The median income for a household in the township was $33,221, and the median income for a family was $36,346. Males had a median income of $28,026 versus $19,563 for females. The per capita income for the township was $14,143. About 9.7% of families and 10.9% of the population were below the poverty line, including 11.3% of those under age 18 and 9.8% of those age 65 or over.

== Government ==
West Beaver Township is in the 82nd Legislative District for the Pennsylvania General Assembly held by C. Adam Harris whose office is located on Main St., Middleburg. Pennsylvania Senate District 27 is held by Senator John Gordner. West Beaver Township is in the United States House of Representatives 10th District held by Rep. Chris Carney. Pennsylvania is represented in the United States Senate by Senator Bob Casey, Jr.

== Schools ==
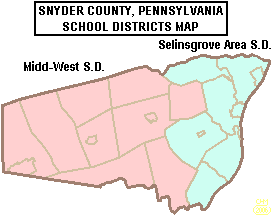
Map of Snyder County, Pennsylvania Public School Districts

Midd-West School District is the area's public school system.
