= West Perry Township, Pennsylvania =

Township in Pennsylvania, United States

Coordinates: 40°43′00″N 77°04′59″W

- Township
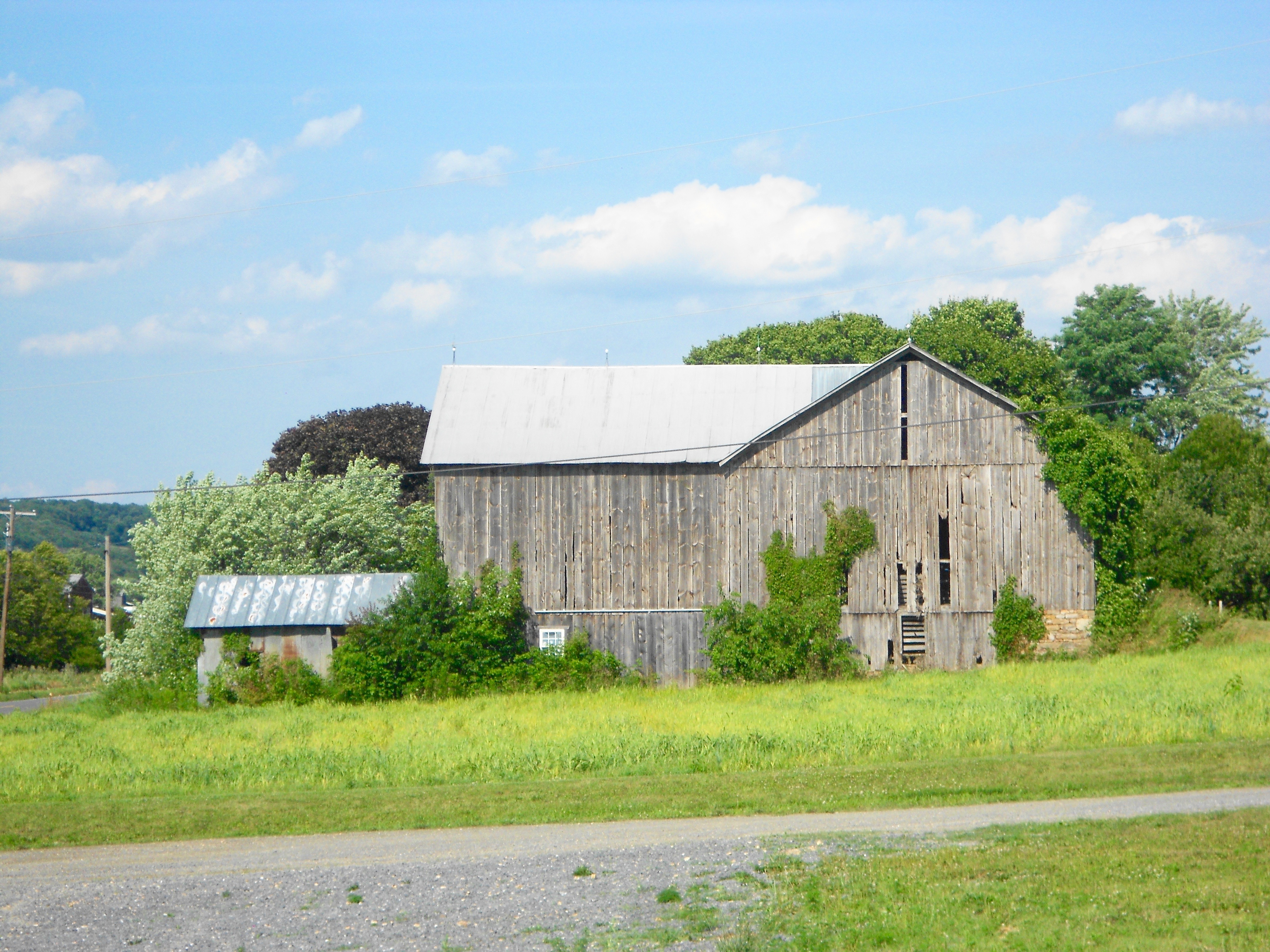
- Barn near Richfield

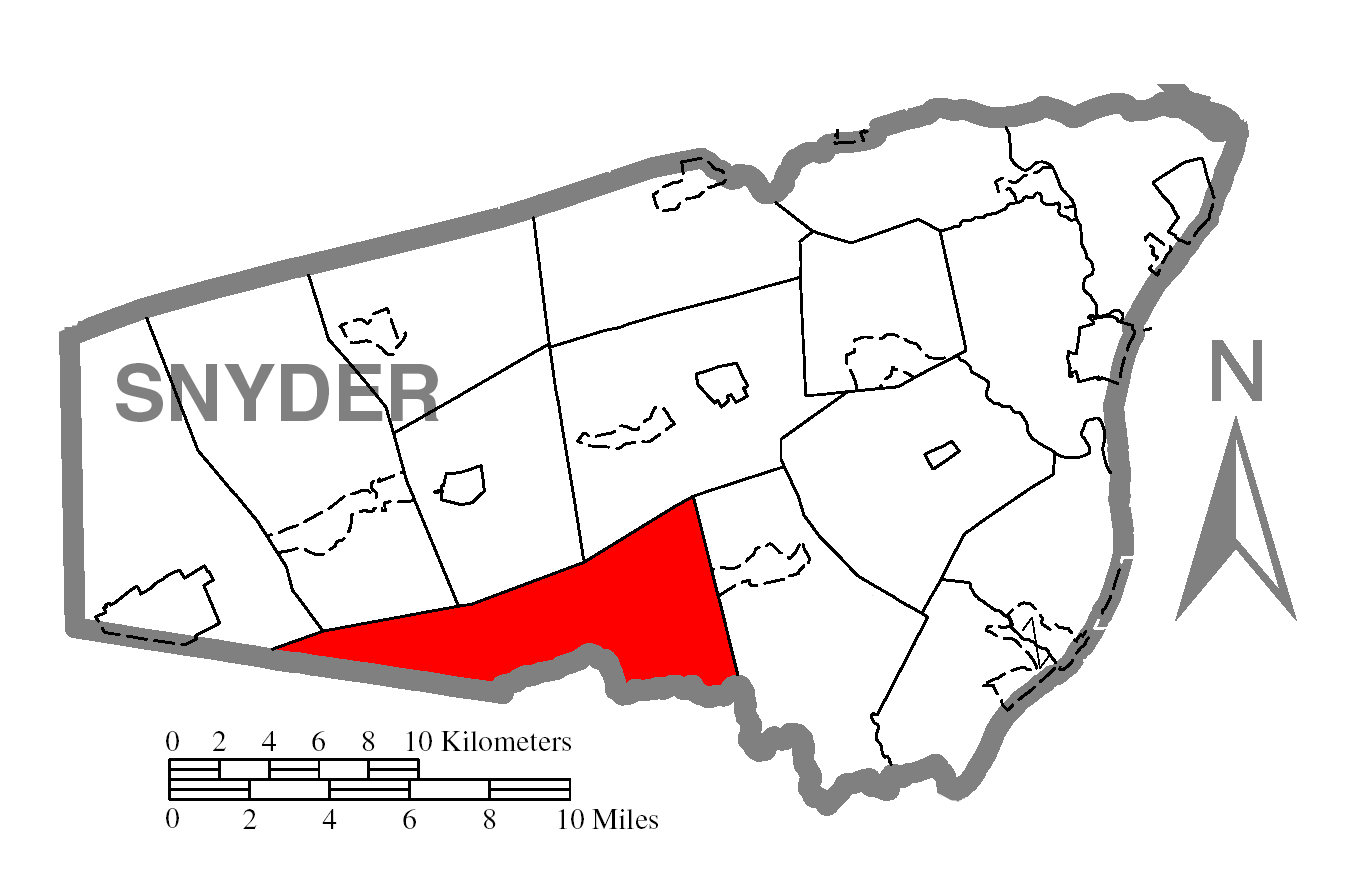
- Map of Snyder County, Pennsylvania highlighting West Perry Township

- Map of Snyder County, Pennsylvania
- Country: United States
- State: Pennsylvania
- County: Snyder
- Incorporated: 1858

Area
  - Total: 27.03 sq mi (70.01 km^{2})
  - Land: 26.98 sq mi (69.89 km^{2})
  - Water: 0.046 sq mi (0.12 km^{2})

Population (2020)
  - Total: 1,082 ▲
  - Estimate (2022): 1,076
  - Density: 40.1/sq mi (15.47/km^{2})
- Time zone: UTC-5 (Eastern (EST))
  - Summer (DST): UTC-4 (EDT)
- Area codes: 570, 717
- FIPS code: 42-109-83808

West Perry Township is a township in Snyder County, Pennsylvania, United States. The population was 1,082 at the 2020 census.

== Geography ==
According to the United States Census Bureau, the township has a total area of 26.4 square miles (68.4 km^{2}), all land.

West Perry Township is bordered by West Beaver, Spring, Beaver and Franklin Townships to the north, Perry Township to the east and Juniata County to the south.

The township contains part of the census-designated place of Richfield.

== Demographics ==
Historical population
Census	Pop.	Note	%±
2010	1,071		—
2020	1,082		1.0%
2022 (est.)	1,076		−0.6%
U.S. Decennial Census

As of the census of 2000, there were 1,038 people, 377 households, and 304 families residing in the township. The population density was 39.3 inhabitants per square mile (15.2/km^{2}). There were 462 housing units at an average density of 17.5/sq mi (6.8/km^{2}). The racial makeup of the township was 99.52% White, 0.19% African American, 0.10% Asian, 0.10% from other races, and 0.10% from two or more races. Hispanic or Latino of any race were 0.10% of the population.

There were 377 households, out of which 33.2% had children under the age of 18 living with them, 70.8% were married couples living together, 5.6% had a female householder with no husband present, and 19.1% were non-families. 15.9% of all households were made up of individuals, and 8.5% had someone living alone who was 65 years of age or older. The average household size was 2.75 and the average family size was 3.08.

In the township the population was spread out, with 26.2% under the age of 18, 7.3% from 18 to 24, 28.0% from 25 to 44, 22.3% from 45 to 64, and 16.2% who were 65 years of age or older. The median age was 38 years. For every 100 females, there were 96.6 males. For every 100 females age 18 and over, there were 92.5 males.

The median income for a household in the township was $35,521, and the median income for a family was $41,417. Males had a median income of $30,117 versus $22,250 for females. The per capita income for the township was $15,288. About 2.5% of families and 4.7% of the population were below the poverty line, including 5.6% of those under age 18 and 5.9% of those age 65 or over.

== Government ==
West Perry Township is in the 82nd Legislative District for the Pennsylvania General Assembly held by C. Adam Harris whose office is located on Main St., Middleburg. Pennsylvania Senate District 27 is held by Senator John Gordner. West Perry Township is in the United States House of Representatives 10th District held by Rep. Chris Carney. Pennsylvania is represented in the United States Senate by Senator Bob Casey, Jr. and Pat Toomey.

== Education ==
Midd-West School District is the area's public school system.

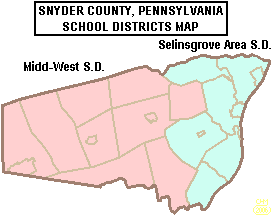
Map of Snyder County, Pennsylvania Public School Districts
