= LuLu =

Defunct American motor vehicle manufacturer

LuLu Cyclecar
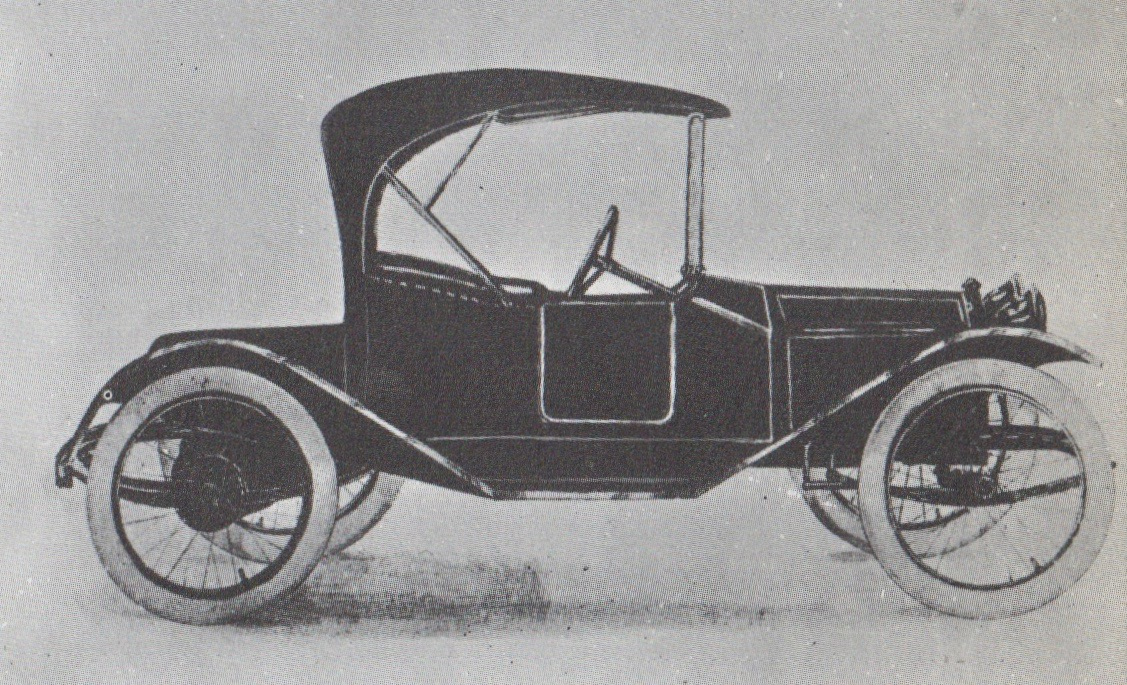
- 1914 Lulu Cyclecar from Cycle & Automobile Trade Journal

Overview
- Manufacturer: Kearns Motor Truck Company
- Also called: Kearns-Kar
- Production: 1914–1915
- Assembly: Beavertown, Pennsylvania

Body and chassis
- Class: Cyclecar
- Body style: roadster

Powertrain
- Engine: Farmers
- Power output: 12-hp
- Transmission: 3-speed selective

Dimensions
- Wheelbase: 96-inch
- Width: 44-inch

Chronology
- Successor: Kearns Trio

The LuLu cyclecar was produced by the Kearns Motor Truck Company in Beavertown, Snyder County, Pennsylvania from 1914 to 1915.

== History ==
The company was founded by Charles Maxwell Kearns in 1903. Kearns was the son of a buggy maker and had a gift for invention but little more than a grade school education. He began by first mounting an engine on a buggy and progressed to more elaborate designs and heavy trucks.

The LuLu automobile was manufactured at 25 vehicles per week in 1914. Billed as "more than a cyclecar", it had a four-cylinder monobloc engine and three-speed gearing. It sold for $450, (equivalent to $14,464 in 2025).

=== Kearns Automobiles ===
The first logo for the "Kearns Kar Kompany" frames the words in the outline of the grille of a 1907 high wheeler runabout. The logo for the company boasted the car as being "Valveless, Gearless, and Clutchless". The engine for the first vehicles was an air-cooled 3-cylinder "porcupine head" two cycle engine. The vehicle's transmission was a friction drive, consisting of a flat spinning flywheel mounted on the engine which was set at right angles to a rubber lined steel drive wheel which slid from side to side on a drive shaft mounted in parallel to the rear axle. Sprockets on the end of the drive shaft relayed power to the rear wheels via a pair of chains, one per wheel..

=== Cyclecar ===
The introduction of the LuLu cyclecar in 1914 marked a change in engineering for the vehicle. The two cycle engine was discarded in favor of the more reliable 4-stroke engine and a clutch and 3-speed transmission replaced the friction drive. World War I caused the company to cease production. However, after the Great War, the company resumed production but shifted to making trucks, including fire trucks.
