= Selinsgrove Area School District =

School district in Pennsylvania, United States

Address
- 329 Seals Avenue Selinsgrove, PA, 17870; United States

District information
- Grades: K–12
- Superintendent: Dr. Frank Jankowski
- Budget: US$49 million
- NCES District ID: 4221120

Students and staff
- Students: 2,384 (2022–23)
- Teachers: 166.00 (FTE)
- Student–teacher ratio: 13.36
- District mascot: Selinsgrove Seals
- Colors: Royal Blue and Scarlet

Other information
- Website: https://www.seal-pa.org/

Selinsgrove Area School District is a mid-sized, suburban/rural public school district centered in Selinsgrove, Pennsylvania in eastern Snyder County, Pennsylvania.

According to the Pennsylvania Budget and Policy Center, 39.5% of the district's pupils lived at 185% or below the Federal Poverty level as shown by their eligibility for the federal free or reduced price school meal programs in 2012.

Selinsgrove Area High school students may choose to attend SUN Area Technical Institute, located in New Berlin, for training in the: culinary, allied health, construction and mechanical trades. The Central Susquehanna Intermediate Unit IU16 provides the district with a wide variety of services like specialized education for disabled students and hearing, speech and visual disability services and professional development for staff and faculty.

== Schools ==
- Selinsgrove Area High School (Grades 9–12)
- Selinsgrove Area Middle School (Grades 6–8)
- Selinsgrove Area Intermediate School (Grades 3–5)
- Selinsgrove Area Elementary School (K–2)

In May 2011, the board voted to realign the schools moving grade six to the Intermediate School and shifting the management team. In 2012, the board approved shifting the sixth grade back to the middle school. Jackson-Penn Elementary School, located in Penn Township, was closed in December 2009. It had served as the district's Kindergarten Center for two years. In 2013, the board rented the former Jackson-Penn building to a private special needs student school called New Story.

== Extracurriculars ==
The district offers an extensive variety of clubs, activities and sports.

=== Clubs and organizations ===
Selinsgrove's student life programs include: French Club, Technology Student Association, Student Council, Forensics (of the National Forensic League), Chess club, FFA, Student Government, German Club, Key Club, SADD Club, Spanish Club, and Web Heads. Students from the school have been notably successful in participating in Pennsylvania History Day and the Pennsylvania Mock Trial Competition.

=== Music and performance ===
The school's music program offers both band instrumental and voice training. Annual concerts are conducted by programs at the high school and middle school. Students have access to free instrument lessons beginning in the elementary schools.

==== Band ====
The Marching Band is Directed by Mr. Nicholas H. Eischeid and supports the community by playing at local events like the annual Memorial Day ceremony and the Market Street Festival. Selinsgrove's band also performs each week at the school's football games; they perform in concert form at least once per semester. The band has played at Canadian football games and marched in several Disney World holiday parades.

==== Chorus ====
The Honors Chorus is Directed by Rachel Fae Weir Ulsh and has performed at Carnegie Hall and at the dedication of the National World War II Memorial in Washington, DC as the representative of Pennsylvania. The 2005–2006 chorus premiered Matthew Harris' piece, "Oceanic Eyes".

==== Theater ====
Musical Theater has been Directed by Mrs. Rachel Ulsh and Mr. James Muller for many years. Students can also elect to participate on-stage in Selinsgrove's 2 plays or annual musical. Notable productions in recent years include "The Little Shop of Horrors", "Annie Get Your Gun", Rodgers and Hammerstein's Cinderella, "Jesus Christ Superstar", "Footloose", The Little Mermaid, Shrek and "Copacabana". The Selinsgrove Area Middle School (SAMS) Will be starting a Musical Program for Middle Schoolers in Late 2024 and will be Directed by Miss. Christina M. Rickenbach and Miss. Liza Smith. They are The Chorus and Band Directors of the Middle School.

=== Athletics ===
The interscholastic athletic program offers students a plethora of opportunities to develop sport-related skills. Some sports offer multiple levels beginning the middle school. Several of the school's teams have excelled, including the bowling, field hockey, girls' basketball and football teams. Selinsgrove participates in various sports through the Pennsylvania Interscholastic Athletic Association and is a founding member of the Pennsylvania Heartland Athletic Conference.

In 2009, the school's football team captured the PIAA class AAA state football championship by defeating Manheim Central by a score of 10–7 for the school's first state football championship and the second overall championship; the first being Track & Field in 1974.

Boys Sports

Baseball
Basketball (HS V & 9th, JHS 7th & 8th)
Bowling
Cross country
Football (Varsity, JV, 9th grade, JHS)
Golf
Lacrosse
Soccer (HS, MS)
Tennis
Track and field
Wrestling (HS, JHS)

Girls Sports

Basketball (HS, JHS)
Bowling
Cheerleading (HS, JHS)
Cross-country
Field hockey (HS, JHS)
Soccer (HS, MS)
Softball
Tennis
Track and field
Wrestling (HS, JHS)
