= Selinsgrove Area High School =

Coordinates: 40.8054°N 76.8686°W

- Selinsgrove Area High School logo

Location
- 500 N Broad St. Selinsgrove, Pennsylvania 17870; United States

Information
- Type: Public high school
- Motto: Enabling life-long learning.
- Established: 1932
- School district: Selinsgrove Area School District
- NCES District ID: 4221120
- NCES School ID: 422112003969
- Principal: Matt Conrad
- Teaching staff: 49.50 (on FTE basis)
- Grades: 9th–12th
- Enrollment: 802 (2022-23)
- Student to teacher ratio: 16.20
- Colors: Red & Blue
- Nickname: Seals
- Newspaper: Grove Gazette
- Yearbook: Cynosure
- Website: seal-pa.org/schools/high-9-12

Selinsgrove Area High School is a midsized public school located in Selinsgrove, Snyder County, Pennsylvania. The school serves a rural-suburban community of 22,259 residents according to the US Census 2013. SAHS is the sole high school operated by the Selinsgrove Area School District.

== Student activities ==
The Selinsgrove Area School District offers a wide variety of activities, clubs and an extensive sports program.

=== Music and performance ===
The school's music program offers both band instrumental and voice training under a co-curricular policy. Co-curricular applies to those programs that are sponsored or approved by the Board and are conducted both during the regular school day as part of the approved curriculum and partly after the regular school day through approved performances and demonstrations.

==== Band ====
The SAHS Marching Band, directed by Nicholas Eischeid, supports the community by playing at local events like the annual Memorial Day ceremony and the Market Street Festival. Selinsgrove's band also performs each week at the school's football games; they perform in concert form at least once per semester. The band has played at Canadian football games and marched in several Disney World holiday parades.

==== Chorus ====
The Honors Chorus is directed by Rachel Ulsh and has performed at Carnegie Hall and at the dedication of the National World War II Memorial in Washington, DC as the representative of Pennsylvania. The 2005–2006 chorus premiered Matthew Harris' piece, "Oceanic Eyes".

=== Sports ===
Since 2000, the district has spent millions to add to its high school sports facilities. In a $2.5 million project, the high school stadium received a major renovation including the addition of plastic grass and a new track. A soccer field and field hockey field were developed in the lawn areas in the front of the high school building. A small portion of the development was paid for by team booster clubs. A new gymnasium was built as a part of the adjacent elementary school, to provide space for additional basketball programs.

In 2008, Selinsgrove School Board added its first club sport - lacrosse for both boys and girls, stipulating the teams would not receive taxpayer funded support. They are permitted to use the school's name in order to participate in PIAA events.

The district funds:

Boys

- Baseball - AAAA
- Basketball - AAAAA
- Bowling - AAAA
- Cross country - AA
- Football - AAAA
- Golf - AAA
- Lacrosse - AA
- Soccer - AAA
- Swimming and Diving - AA
- Tennis - AA
- Track and field - AAA
- Wrestling - AAA

Girls

- Basketball - AAA
- Bowling - AAAA
- Cross country - AA
- Field hockey - AA
- Lacrosse - AA
- Swimming and Diving - AA
- Golf - AAA
- Soccer (Fall) - AA
- Softball - AAA
- Girls' tennis - AAA
- Track and field - AA
- Volleyball - AAA

According to PIAA directory July 2013

== Alma mater ==
Hail Alma Mater – Our cherished Mother. Hail to thy glorious name! May it have wide fame. God grant that we be – of your past worthy And that in future years – you may have no peers. By Harold W. Follmer, Jr., Class of 1942

== Building ==
The current high school building was built in the 1930s through funding from the New Deal. The building was designed by Lawrie and Green architects of Harrisburg, PA. It is a concrete with steel framing construction, masonry walls and has a red brick exterior.

A two-story addition was added to the rear of the building that provides a media center, several technology labs, a four-office Guidance suite, as well as science and social studies classrooms. There is a cafeteria, a gymnasium with locker rooms, weight lifting rooms and secondary gym space. Parking is available on all four sides of the building. The Harold L. Bolig Memorial football field and Simon R. Rhoads Memorial Track are located behind the high school building.
