= Spring Township, Snyder County, Pennsylvania =

Township in Pennsylvania, United States

Coordinates: 40°47′00″N 77°15′59″W

- Township
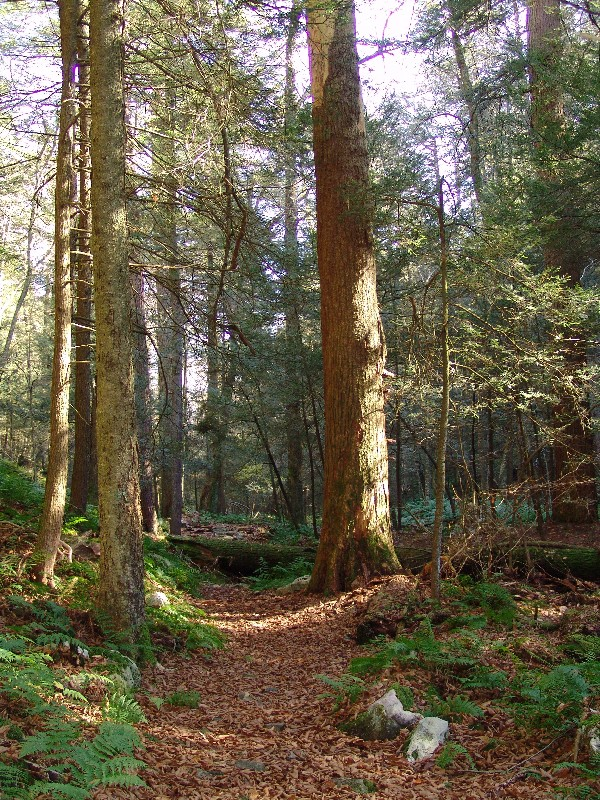
- Snyder Middleswarth Natural Area in Spring Township

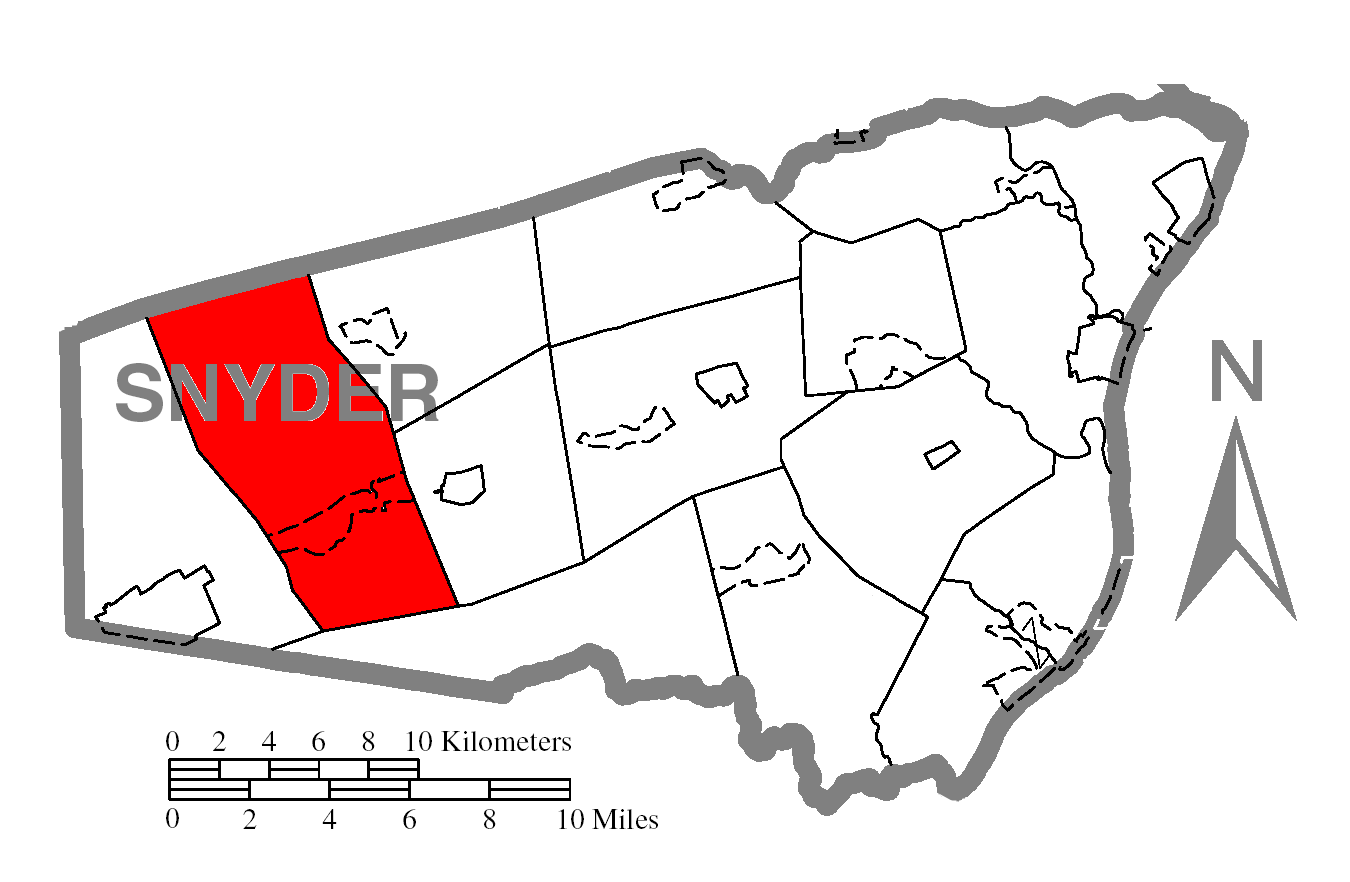
- Map of Snyder County, Pennsylvania highlighting Spring Township

- Map of Snyder County, Pennsylvania
- Country: United States
- State: Pennsylvania
- County: Snyder
- Incorporated: 1885

Area
  - Total: 37.41 sq mi (96.89 km^{2})
  - Land: 37.07 sq mi (96.00 km^{2})
  - Water: 0.34 sq mi (0.89 km^{2})

Population (2020)
  - Total: 1,635 ▲
  - Estimate (2022): 1,626
  - Density: 43.7/sq mi (16.86/km^{2})
- Time zone: UTC-5 (Eastern (EST))
  - Summer (DST): UTC-4 (EDT)
- Area code: 570
- FIPS code: 42-109-72856
- Website: https://spring-township.org/

Spring Township is a township in Snyder County, Pennsylvania, United States. The population was 1,635 at the 2020 census.

== History ==
The Gross Covered Bridge was added to the National Register of Historic Places in 1977.

== Geography ==
According to the United States Census Bureau, the township has a total area of 37.0 square miles (95.8 km^{2}), of which 37.0 square miles (95.7 km^{2}) is land and 0.1 square mile (0.2 km^{2}) (0.16%) is water.

Spring Township is bordered by Union County to the north, Adams and Beaver Townships to the east, West Perry Township to the south and West Beaver Township to the west.

The census-designated place of Beaver Springs is situated in the center of the township.

== Demographics ==
Historical population
| Census | Pop. | Note | %± |
|---|---|---|---|
| 2010 | 1,616 | | — |
| 2020 | 1,635 | | 1.2% |
| 2022 (est.) | 1,626 | | −0.6% |
U.S. Decennial Census

As of the census of 2000, there were 1,563 people, 595 households, and 449 families residing in the township. The population density was 42.3 inhabitants per square mile (16.3/km^{2}). There were 694 housing units at an average density of 18.8/sq mi (7.3/km^{2}). The racial makeup of the township was 98.53% White, 0.13% African American, 0.13% Asian, and 1.22% from two or more races. Hispanic or Latino of any race were 0.32% of the population.

There were 595 households, out of which 33.8% had children under the age of 18 living with them, 64.9% were married couples living together, 7.4% had a female householder with no husband present, and 24.4% were non-families. 21.7% of all households were made up of individuals, and 12.4% had someone living alone who was 65 years of age or older. The average household size was 2.63 and the average family size was 3.06.

In the township the population was spread out, with 26.0% under the age of 18, 7.5% from 18 to 24, 27.3% from 25 to 44, 24.4% from 45 to 64, and 14.7% who were 65 years of age or older. The median age was 38 years. For every 100 females, there were 89.9 males. For every 100 females age 18 and over, there were 90.3 males.

The median income for a household in the township was $34,602, and the median income for a family was $38,333. Males had a median income of $28,049 versus $16,964 for females. The per capita income for the township was $14,858. About 7.3% of families and 10.4% of the population were below the poverty line, including 16.4% of those under age 18 and 6.6% of those age 65 or over.

== Government ==
Spring Township is governed by three elected supervisors. The township offices are located in the Spring Township Municipal Building 80 Railroad Ave., Beaver Springs, Pa. 17812. 570-658-7234 / Fax: 570-658-7064 The Supervisors meet on the fourth Tuesday of each month at 7:30 p.m. at the Spring Township Municipal Building.

The Spring Township Planning Commission meets on the third Monday of each month.

Snyder County is governed by three County Commissioners. Many county government offices are located in the courthouse in Middleburg, Pennsylvania.

The polling place for Spring Township is located in the Spring Township Building in Beaver Springs, Pennsylvania.

Spring Township is in the 82nd Legislative District for the Pennsylvania General Assembly held by Adam Harris, whose office is located on Main St., Middleburg. Pennsylvania Senate District 27 is held by Senator John Gordner. Spring Township is a part of Pennsylvania's 10th congressional district, represented by Chris Carney. Pennsylvania is represented in the United States Senate by Senator Bob Casey, Jr. and Senator Pat Toomey

== Schools ==
Midd-West School District is the area's public school system.
