= Beaver Springs, Pennsylvania =

Unincorporated community in Pennsylvania, US

Beaver Springs
- Census-designated place
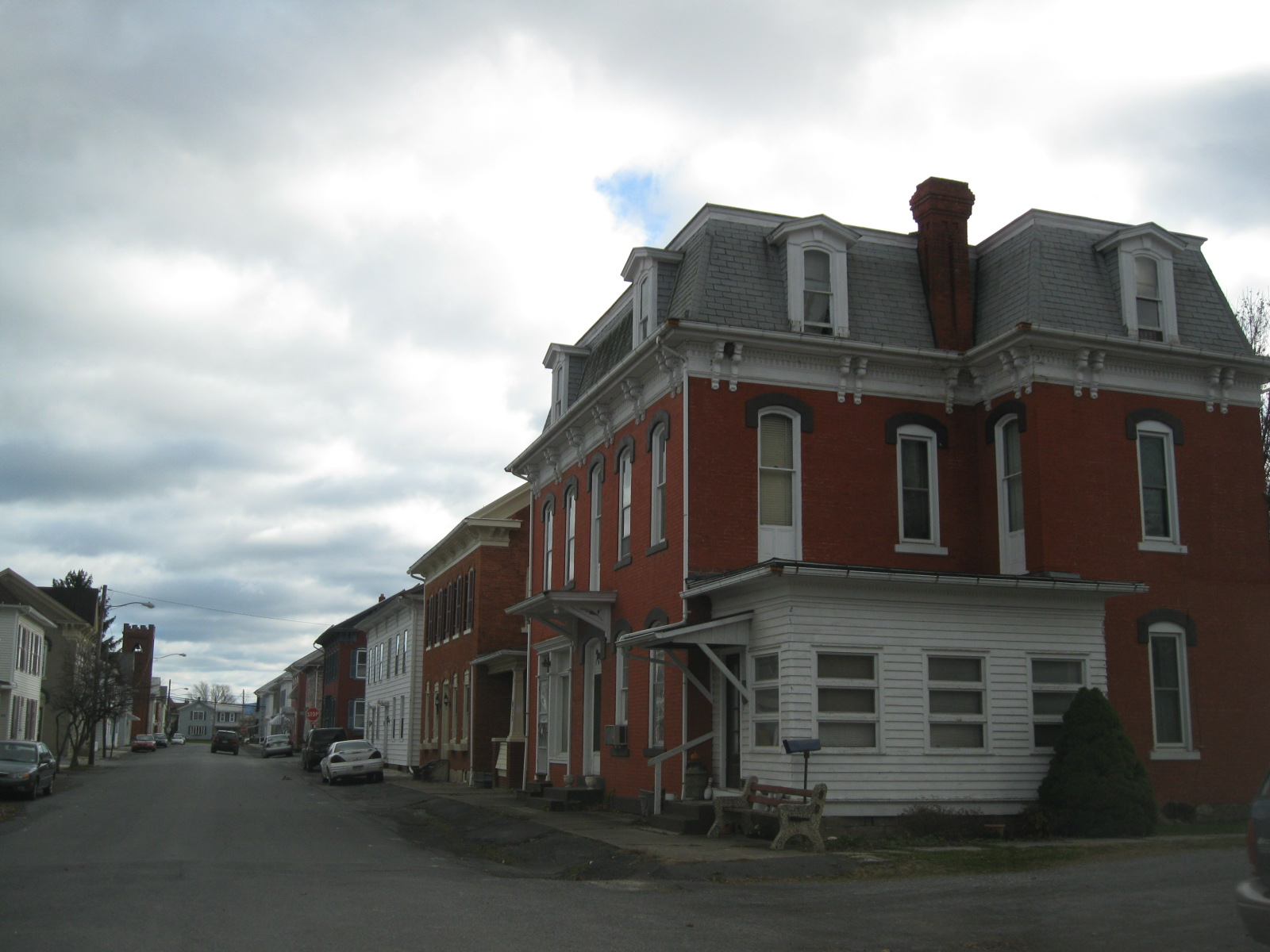

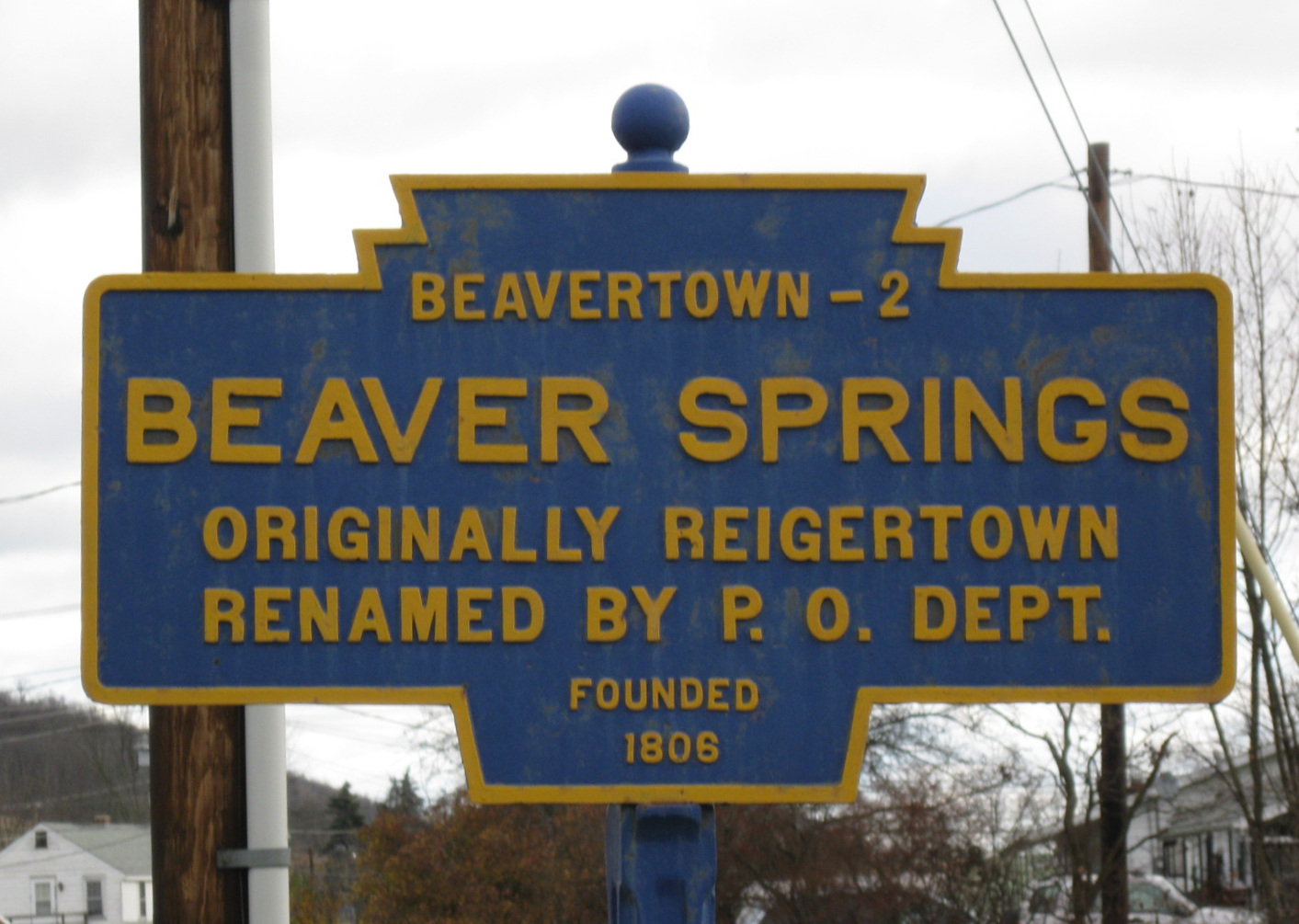
- Keystone Marker

- Location within the U.S. state of Pennsylvania Beaver Springs (the United States)
- Coordinates: 40°44′40″N 77°12′53″W
- Country: United States
- State: Pennsylvania
- County: Snyder

Area
  - Total: 1.36 sq mi (3.52 km^{2})
  - Land: 1.36 sq mi (3.51 km^{2})
  - Water: 0.0039 sq mi (0.01 km^{2})

Population (2020)
  - Total: 691
  - Density: 510.3/sq mi (197.01/km^{2})
- Time zone: UTC-5 (Eastern (EST))
  - Summer (DST): UTC-4 (EDT)
- ZIP codes: 17812, 17843
- Area codes: 570 and 272
- FIPS code: 42-04824

Beaver Springs is a census-designated place in Spring Township, Snyder County, Pennsylvania, United States. As of the 2020 census, Beaver Springs had a population of 691.

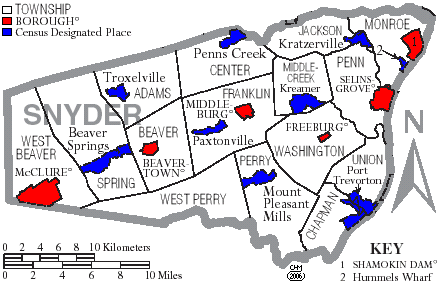
Map of Snyder County, Pennsylvania with Municipal Labels showing Boroughs (red), Townships (white), and Census-designated places (blue).

Beaver Springs was first called Reigertown before the name was changed by the post office. It was named for Adam Reiger. He was given the land as a land grant from the Penn proprietors. The town was also known for a time as Adamsburg. The current name was based on the beavers who were active in a local stream and an important spring that was along its main street. In 2006, Beaver Springs celebrated its bicentennial.

== Geography ==
Beaver Springs is located at 40°44′40″N 77°12′53″W (40.744464, -77.214598).

According to the United States Census Bureau, the community has a total area of 2.5 square miles (6.5 km^{2}), all land.

== Demographics ==
Historical population
Census	Pop.	Note	%±
2020	691		—
U.S. Decennial Census

As of the census of 2000, there were 634 people, 267 households, and 190 families residing in the community. The population density was 256.4 inhabitants per square mile (99.0/km^{2}). There were 274 housing units at an average density of 110.8 per square mile (42.8/km^{2}). The racial makeup of the community was 98.58% White, 0.32% African American, 0.16% Asian, and 0.95% from two or more races.

There were 267 households, out of which 30.7% had children under the age of 18 living with them, 58.8% were married couples living together, 9.4% had a female householder with no husband present, and 28.5% were non-families. 25.5% of all households were made up of individuals, and 14.6% had someone living alone who was 65 years of age or older. The average household size was 2.37 and the average family size was 2.83.

The population was spread out, with 22.2% under the age of 18, 5.8% from 18 to 24, 27.0% from 25 to 44, 26.7% from 45 to 64, and 18.3% who were 65 years of age or older. The median age was 42 years. For every 100 females, there were 83.8 males. For every 100 females age 18 and over, there were 87.5 males.

The median income for a household in Beaver Springs was $30,000, and the median income for a family was $35,987. Males had a median income of $27,120 versus $18,125 for females. The per capita income for the CDP was $14,796. About 7.3% of families and 7.9% of the population were below the poverty line, including 6.1% of those under age 18 and 9.9% of those age 65 or over.
