= Adams Township, Snyder County, Pennsylvania =

Township in Pennsylvania, United States

Coordinates: 40°50′00″N 77°09′59″W

- Township
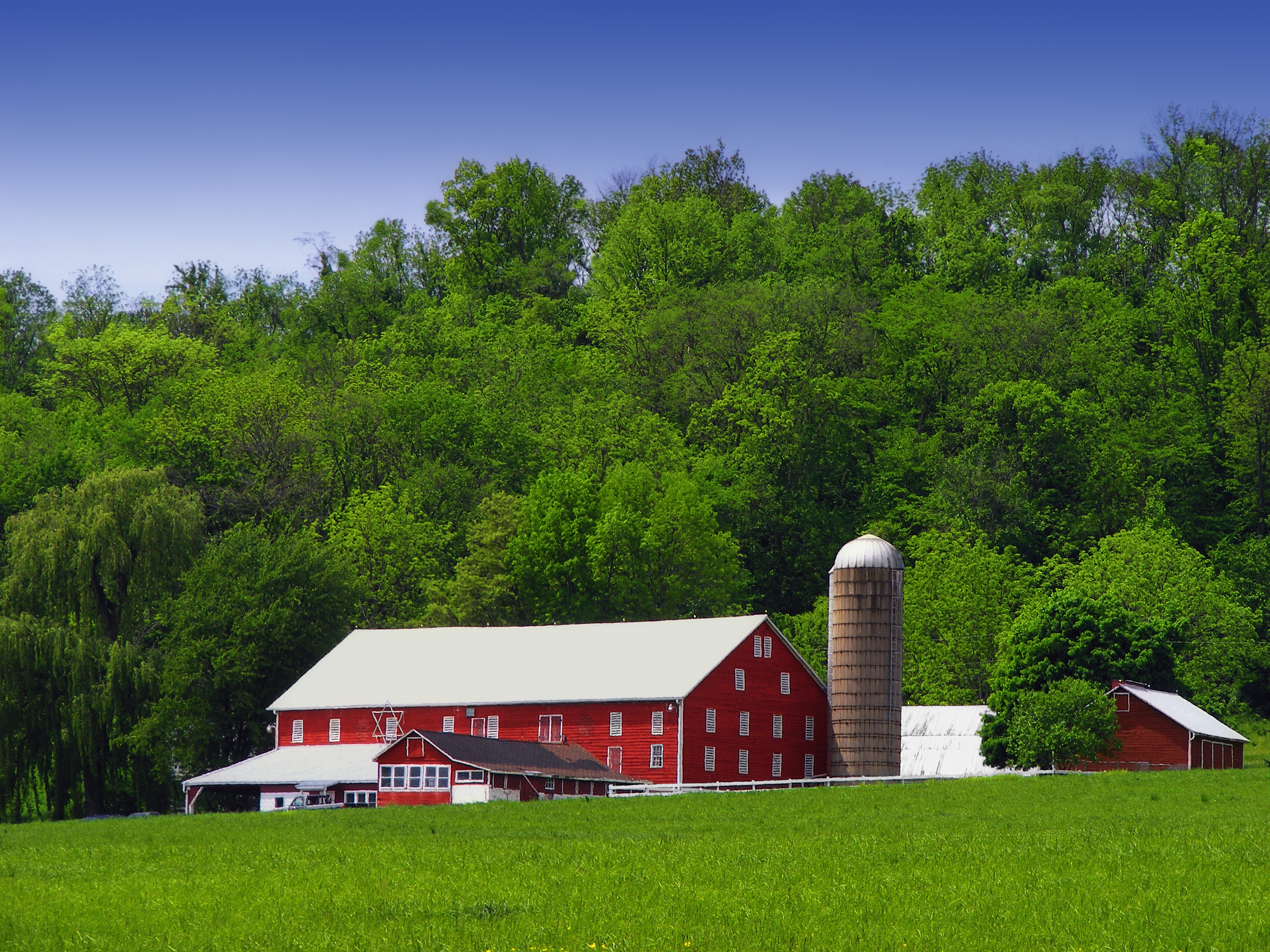
- An Adams Township farm

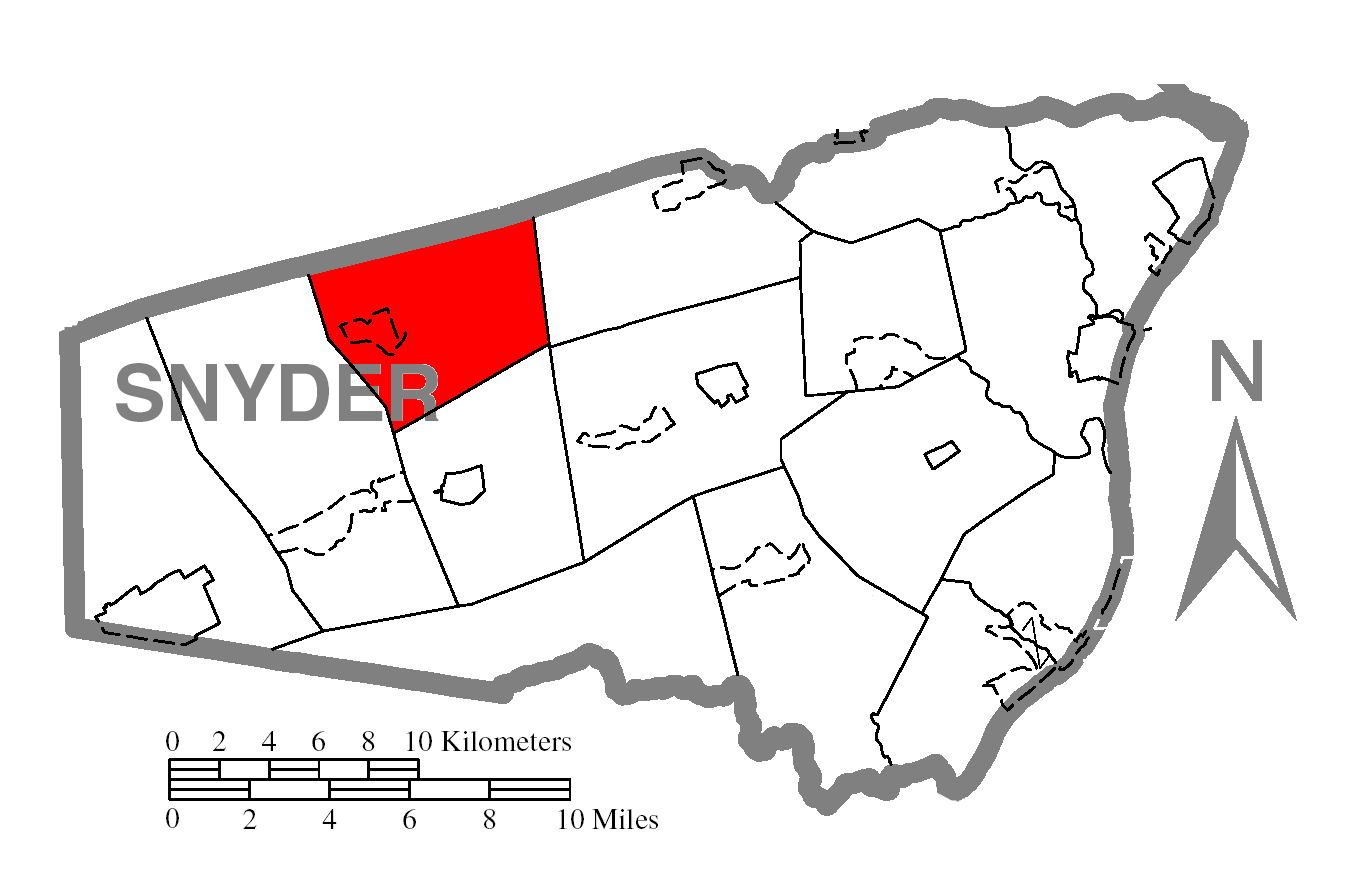
- Map of Snyder County, Pennsylvania highlighting Adams Township

- Map of Snyder County, Pennsylvania
- Country: United States
- State: Pennsylvania
- County: Snyder
- Settled: 1754
- Incorporated: 1874

Area
  - Total: 20.59 sq mi (53.33 km^{2})
  - Land: 20.18 sq mi (52.26 km^{2})
  - Water: 0.42 sq mi (1.08 km^{2})

Population (2020)
  - Total: 895 ▼
  - Estimate (2022): 895
  - Density: 45.3/sq mi (17.49/km^{2})
- Time zone: UTC-5 (Eastern (EST))
  - Summer (DST): UTC-4 (EDT)
- Area code: 570
- FIPS code: 42-109-00316

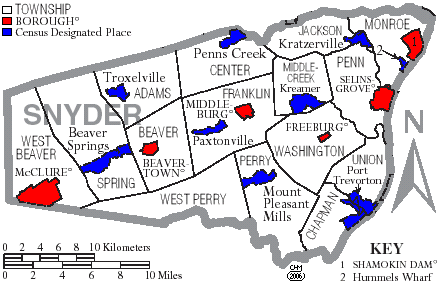
Map of Snyder County, Pennsylvania with Municipal Labels showing Boroughs (red), Townships (white), and Census-designated places (blue).

Adams Township in Snyder County, Pennsylvania, United States, is a township which had a population of 907 at the 2010 census. Per the US Census Bureau, by 2020 the population had reduced to 895 people.

== Geography ==
According to the United States Census Bureau, the township has a total area of 20.9 square miles (54 km^{2}), of which 20.5 square miles (53 km^{2}) is land and 0.3 square miles (0.78 km^{2}) (1.67%) is water.

Adams Township is bordered by Union County to the north, Center Township to the east, Beaver Township to the south and Spring Township to the west.

The census-designated place of Troxelville is in Adams Township.

== Demographics ==
Historical population
Census	Pop.	Note	%±
2010	907		—
2020	895		−1.3%
2022 (est.)	895		0.0%
U.S. Decennial Census

As of the census of 2000, there were 852 people, 320 households, and 253 families residing in the township. The population density was 41.5 inhabitants per square mile (16.0/km^{2}). There were 376 housing units at an average density of 18.3/sq mi (7.1/km^{2}). The racial makeup of the township was 99.53% White, 0.23% African American, 0.23% from other races. Hispanic or Latino of any race were 0.47% of the population.

There were 320 households, out of which 37.5% had children under the age of 18 living with them, 66.3% were married couples living together, 7.8% had a female householder with no spouse present, and 20.9% were non-families. 17.2% of all households were made up of individuals, and 7.5% had someone living alone who was 65 years of age or older. The average household size was 2.66 and the average family size was 2.97.

In the Township, the population was spread out, with 26.3% under the age of 18, 7.4% from 18 to 24, 30.2% from 25 to 44, 23.9% from 45 to 64, and 12.2% who were 65 years of age or older. The median age was 37 years. For every 100 females, there were 101.4 males. For every 100 females age 18 and over, there were 100.6 males.

The median income for a household in the township was $29,940, and the median income for a family was $37,292. Males had a median income of $26,167 versus $21,635 for females. The per capita income for the township was $16,217. About 4.8% of families and 8.0% of the population were below the poverty line, including 7.4% of those under age 18 and 9.9% of those age 65 or over.

== Recreation ==
Walker Lake is a 239-acre (97 ha) man-made lake owned by the Commonwealth of Pennsylvania. It is managed by the Pennsylvania Fish and Boat Commission for public fishing and boating. The Commission stocks the Lake with northern pike and walleye fingerling. The lake was created by damming the North Branch of Middle Creek. Middle Creek flows across Adams Township and has many tributaries. Moyers Mill Run flows from northern Adams Township and empties into Walker Lake.
