= Beaver Township, Snyder County, Pennsylvania =

Township in Pennsylvania, United States

Coordinates: 40°44′00″N 77°06′59″W

- Township
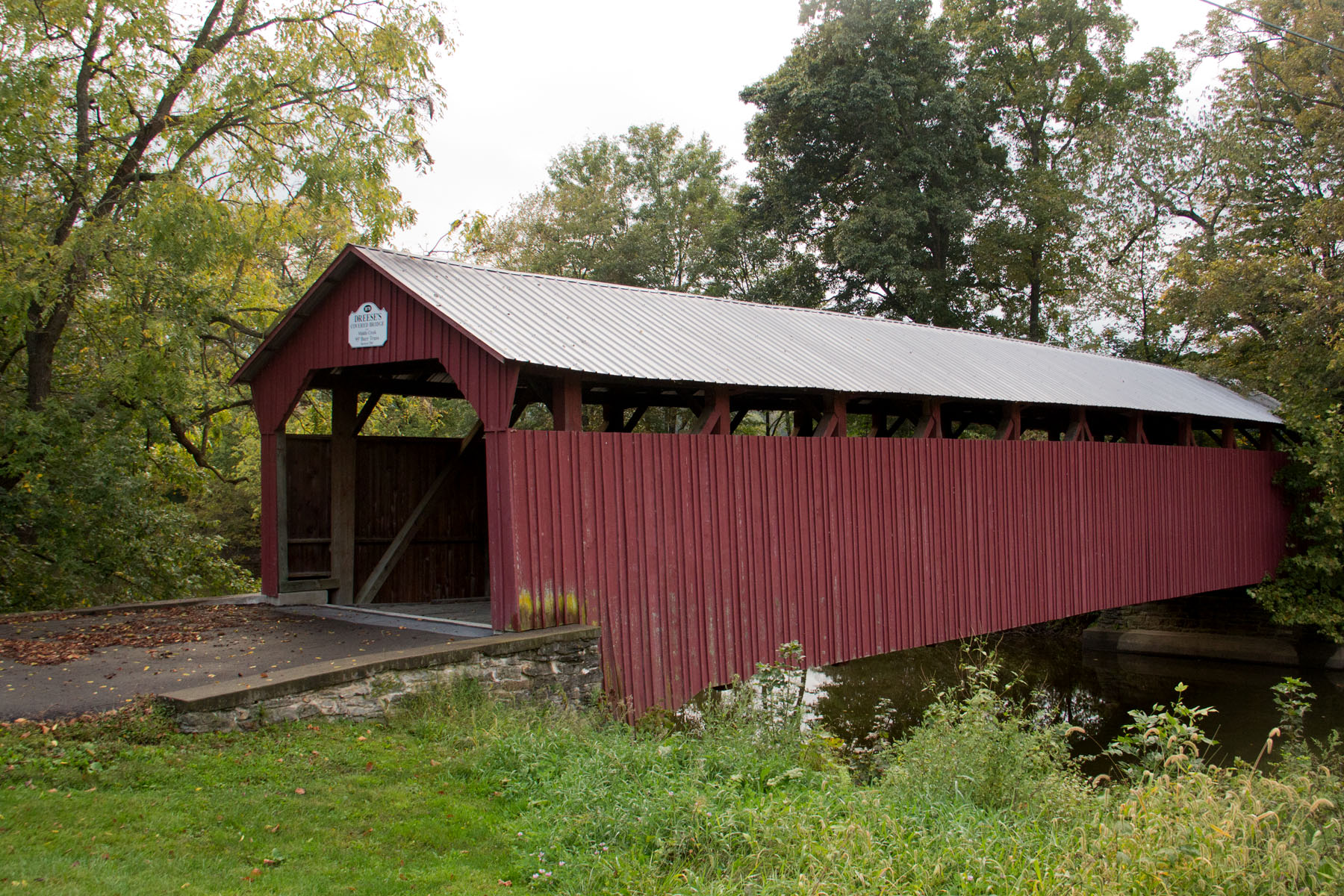
- Dreese's Covered Bridge

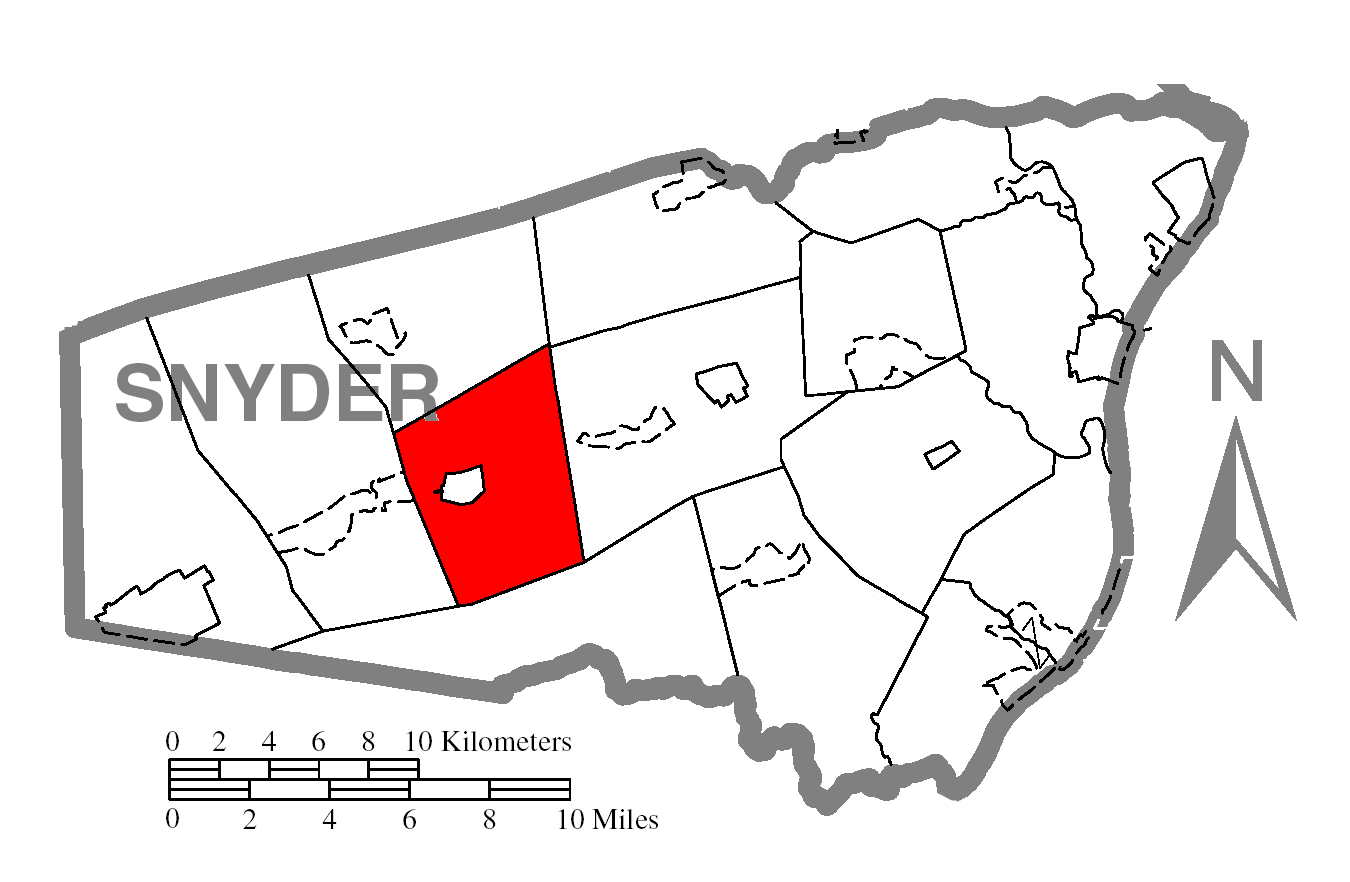
- Map of Snyder County, Pennsylvania highlighting Beaver Township

- Map of Snyder County, Pennsylvania
- Country: United States
- State: Pennsylvania
- County: Snyder
- Settled: 1754
- Incorporated: 1787

Area
  - Total: 18.54 sq mi (48.02 km^{2})
  - Land: 18.38 sq mi (47.61 km^{2})
  - Water: 0.16 sq mi (0.41 km^{2})

Population (2020)
  - Total: 508 ▼
  - Estimate (2022): 504
  - Density: 28.5/sq mi (11.01/km^{2})
- Time zone: UTC-5 (Eastern (EST))
  - Summer (DST): UTC-4 (EDT)
- FIPS code: 42-109-04736

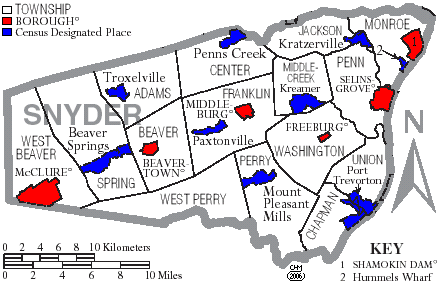
Map of Snyder County, Pennsylvania with Municipal Labels showing Boroughs (red), Townships (white), and Census-designated places (blue).

Beaver Township is a township in Snyder County, Pennsylvania, United States. The population was 508 at the 2020 census.

== History ==
The Dreese's Covered Bridge was added to the National Register of Historic Places in 1979.

== Geography ==
According to the United States Census Bureau, the township has a total area of 18.9 square miles (49 km^{2}), all land.

Beaver Township is bordered by Adams Township to the north, Franklin Township to the east, West Perry Township to the south and Spring Township to the west.

The borough of Beavertown lies in the center of the township.

== Demographics ==
Historical population
Census	Pop.	Note	%±
2010	525		—
2020	508		−3.2%
2022 (est.)	504		−0.8%
U.S. Decennial Census

As of the census of 2000, there were 527 people, 191 households, and 152 families residing in the township. The population density was 28.0 inhabitants per square mile (10.8/km^{2}). There were 217 housing units at an average density of 11.5/sq mi (4.4/km^{2}). The racial makeup of the township was 99.81% White, and 0.19% from two or more races.

There were 191 households, out of which 33.5% had children under the age of 18 living with them, 68.6% were married couples living together, 4.7% had a female householder with no husband present, and 20.4% were non-families. 15.2% of all households were made up of individuals, and 5.8% had someone living alone who was 65 years of age or older. The average household size was 2.76 and the average family size was 3.04.

In the township the population was spread out, with 24.9% under the age of 18, 6.8% from 18 to 24, 30.0% from 25 to 44, 25.4% from 45 to 64, and 12.9% who were 65 years of age or older. The median age was 38 years. For every 100 females there were 103.5 males. For every 100 females age 18 and over, there were 104.1 males.

The median income for a household in the township was $36,875, and the median income for a family was $40,234. Males had a median income of $26,989 versus $18,906 for females. The per capita income for the township was $17,026. About 6.4% of families and 10.0% of the population were below the poverty line, including 16.8% of those under age 18 and 7.3% of those age 65 or over.
