= Middle Creek (Penns Creek tributary) =

Tributary of Penns Creek in Snyder County, Pennsylvania, US

Coordinates: 40°46′31″N 76°52′03″W

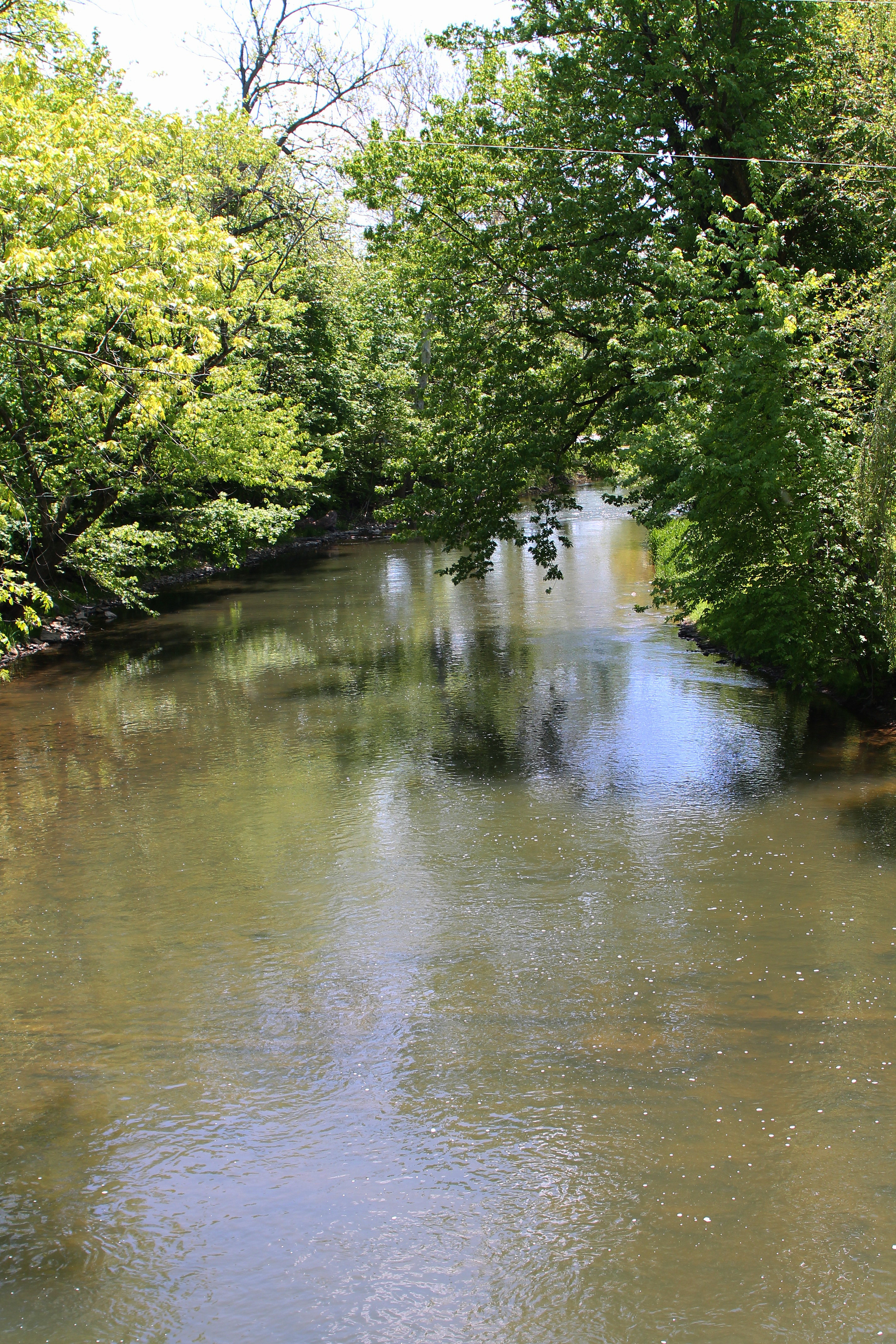
Middle Creek looking downstream from Pennsylvania Route 35

Middle Creek is a 31.7-mile-long (51.0 km) tributary of Penns Creek in Snyder County, Pennsylvania in the United States. Via Penns Creek, it is part of the Susquehanna River watershed.

Middle Creek joins Penns Creek below Selinsgrove. Near Beaver Springs, Middle Creek is impounded by a man-made dam, forming Faylor Lake, a shallow lake spanning 140 acres (57 ha).

== See also ==
- List of rivers of Pennsylvania
