= Beavertown, Snyder County, Pennsylvania =

Borough in Pennsylvania, US

Beavertown, Pennsylvania
- Borough
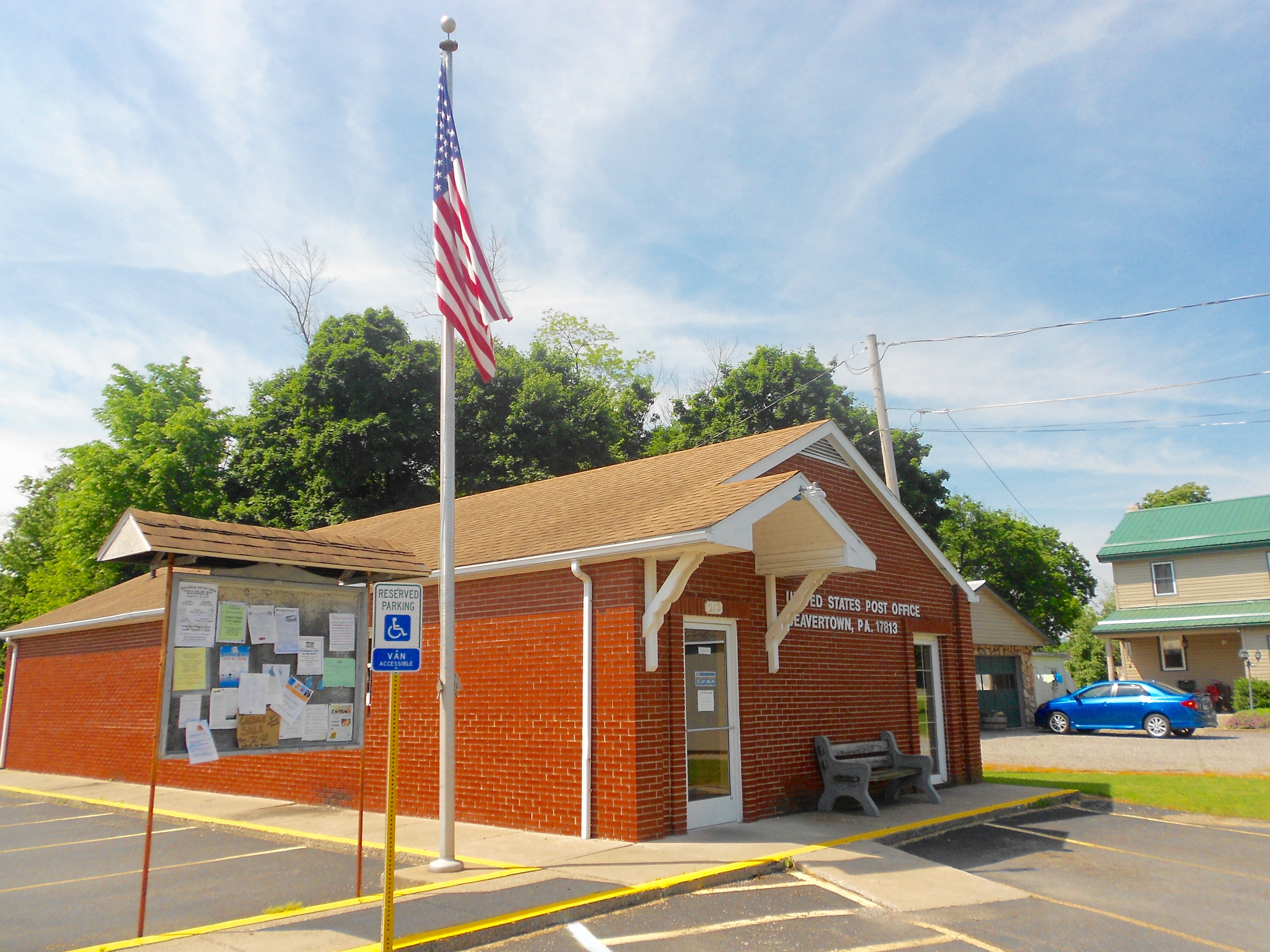
- Post office

- Location of Beavertown in Snyder County, Pennsylvania.

- Location within the state of Pennsylvania Beavertown (the United States)
- Coordinates: 40°45′13″N 77°10′08″W
- Country: United States
- State: Pennsylvania
- County: Snyder
- Settled: 1810
- Incorporated (borough): 1914

Government
  - Mayor: Lee Hollenbach, Jr.

Area
  - Total: 0.77 sq mi (1.99 km^{2})
  - Land: 0.77 sq mi (1.99 km^{2})
  - Water: 0 sq mi (0.00 km^{2})
- Elevation (benchmark at center of borough): 651 ft (198 m)
- Highest elevation (south borough boundary): 710 ft (220 m)
- Lowest elevation (Luphers Run): 595 ft (181 m)

Population (2020)
  - Total: 1,004
  - Density: 1,309.2/sq mi (505.49/km^{2})
- Time zone: Eastern (EST)
  - Summer (DST): EDT
- ZIP code: 17813
- Area code: 570
- FIPS code: 42-04848
- GNIS feature ID: 1215574
- Website: https://www.beavertownborough.com/

Beavertown is a borough in Snyder County, located in Central Pennsylvania's Susquehanna River Valley, United States. The population was 1,005 at the 2020 census.

== Geography ==
According to the United States Census Bureau, the borough has a total area of 0.8 square miles (2.1 km^{2}), all land.

Beavertown is surrounded by Beaver Township.

== Demographics ==
Historical population
Census	Pop.	Note	%±
1880	363		—
1920	525		—
1930	604		15.0%
1940	664		9.9%
1950	700		5.4%
1960	738		5.4%
1970	783		6.1%
1980	853		8.9%
1990	877		2.8%
2000	870		−0.8%
2010	965		10.9%
2020	1,005		4.1%
2021 (est.)	1,002		−0.3%

As of the census of 2000, there were 870 people, 364 households, and 256 families residing in the borough. The population density was 1,132.9 inhabitants per square mile (437.4/km^{2}). There were 394 housing units at an average density of 513.0 per square mile (198.1/km^{2}). The racial makeup of the borough was 98.62% White, 0.11% from other races, and 1.26% from two or more races. Hispanic or Latino of any race were 0.57% of the population.

There were 364 households, out of which 30.5% had children under the age of 18 living with them, 59.9% were married couples living together, 7.4% had a female householder with no husband present, and 29.4% were non-families. 26.6% of all households were made up of individuals, and 15.4% had someone living alone who was 65 years of age or older. The average household size was 2.39 and the average family size was 2.88.

In the borough the population was spread out, with 23.7% under the age of 18, 5.6% from 18 to 24, 30.2% from 25 to 44, 23.7% from 45 to 64, and 16.8% who were 65 years of age or older. The median age was 38 years. For every 100 females there were 86.7 males. For every 100 females age 18 and over, there were 87.0 males.

The median income for a household in the borough was $36,146, and the median income for a family was $43,088. Males had a median income of $30,515 versus $20,952 for females. The per capita income for the borough was $16,792. About 3.1% of families and 6.4% of the population were below the poverty line, including 6.2% of those under age 18 and 4.3% of those age 65 or over.

== Other information ==
Beavertown was the seasonal home of Davy Jones, a member of The Monkees.

Beavertown was originally called Swifttown. It was named after John Swift who settled there having received a grant for the land in 1760. He sold the land to Jacob Lechner. He named the town after Swift.

== See also ==
- LuLu, a car manufactured in Beavertown
