= Kissimmee (disambiguation) =

Kissimmee is the name of several things in the U.S. state of Florida:

- Kissimmee, Florida (city, incorporated in 1883)

- Kissimmee City Street Railway
- Kissimmee Kreatures (arena football team)

- Kissimmee Utility Authority (local power and Internet provider)
- Kissimmee River
- Lake Kissimmee
- Kissimmee, Pennsylvania (town in Pennsylvania)

== Other uses ==
- 25 Miles to Kissimmee, a pop album by Fool's Garden
