= Pleasant Mills =

Pleasant Mills may refer to:

- Pleasant Mills, Indiana
- Pleasant Mills, New Jersey, Atlantic County, New Jersey
- Pleasant Mills (Pleasant Mills, New Jersey), listed on the National Register of Historic Places in Atlantic County, New Jersey

== See also ==
- Mount Pleasant Mills, Pennsylvania
