= Middlecreek Township, Pennsylvania =

Middlecreek Township is the name of some places in the U.S. state of Pennsylvania:

- Middlecreek Township, Snyder County, Pennsylvania
- Middlecreek Township, Somerset County, Pennsylvania
