= Center Township, Snyder County, Pennsylvania =

Township in Pennsylvania, United States

- Township
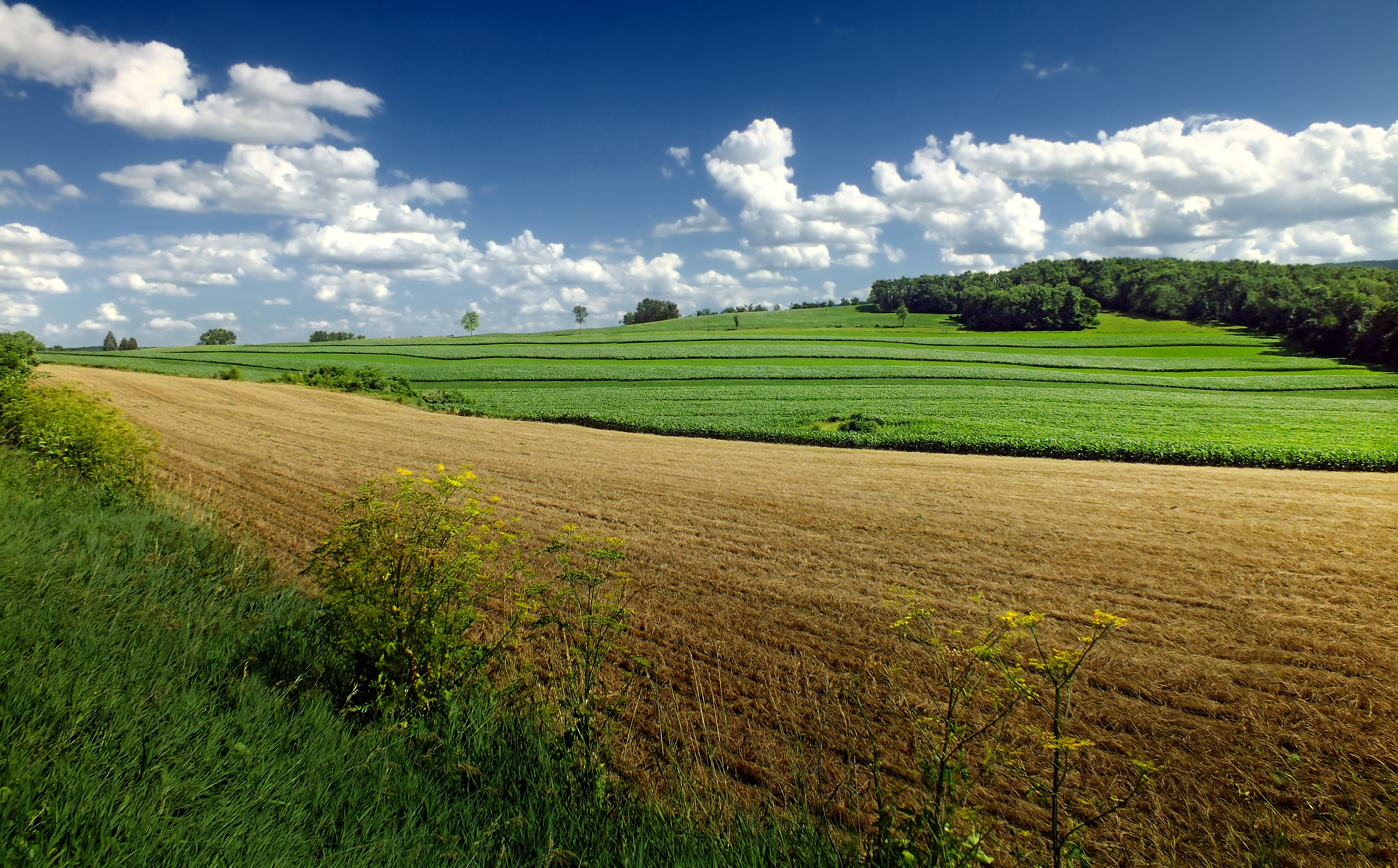
- A farm in the township

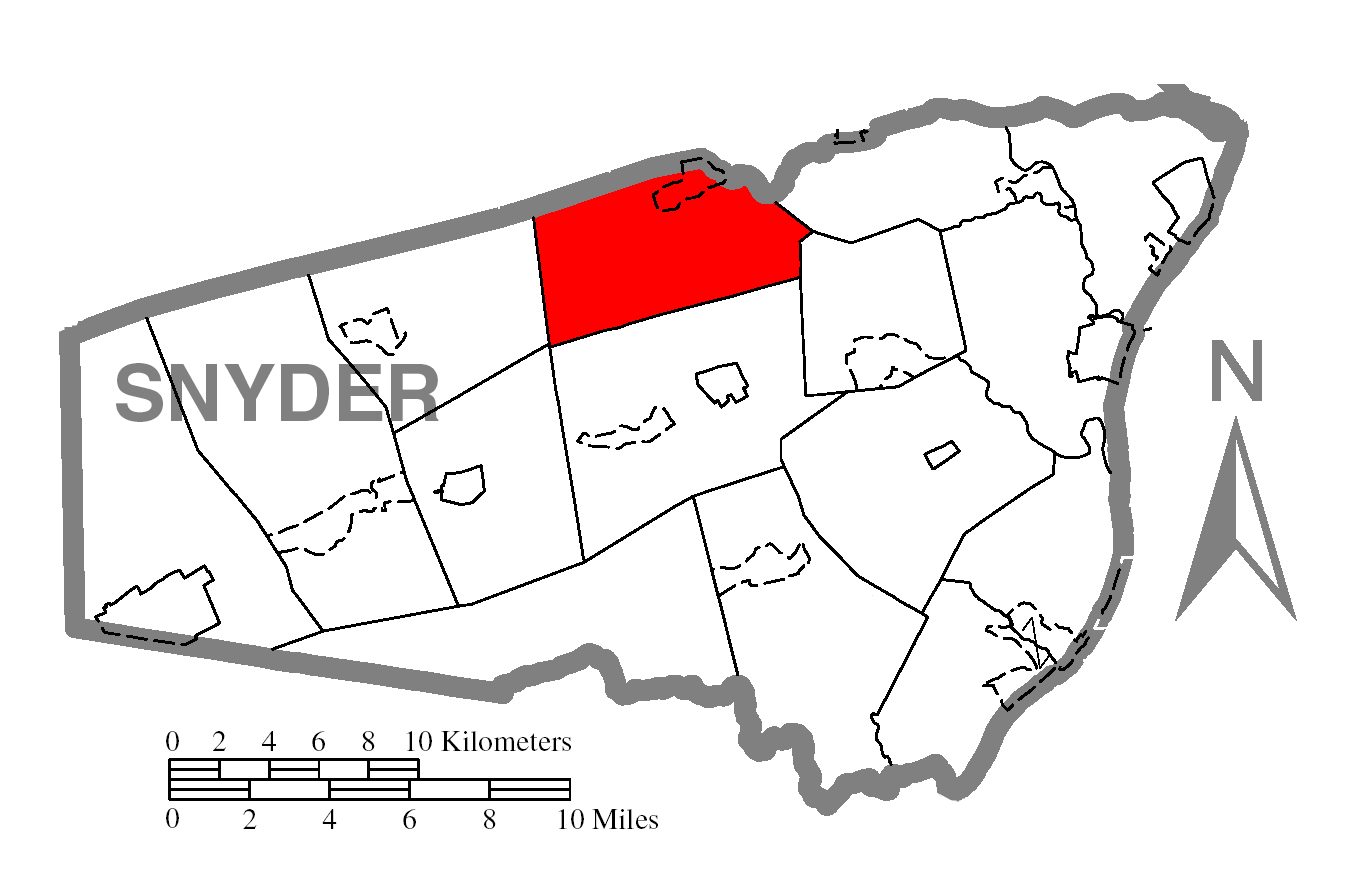
- Map of Snyder County, Pennsylvania highlighting Center Township

- Map of Snyder County, Pennsylvania
- Coordinates: 40°50′00″N 77°07′35″W
- Country: United States
- State: Pennsylvania
- County: Snyder
- Settled: 1745
- Incorporated: 1805

Area
  - Total: 21.12 sq mi (54.70 km^{2})
  - Land: 20.98 sq mi (54.34 km^{2})
  - Water: 0.14 sq mi (0.37 km^{2})

Population (2020)
  - Total: 2,416 ▼
  - Estimate (2022): 2,423
  - Density: 117.4/sq mi (45.31/km^{2})
- Time zone: UTC−5 (Eastern (EST))
  - Summer (DST): UTC−4 (EDT)
- FIPS code: 42-109-12060
- Website: sny-centertwp.org

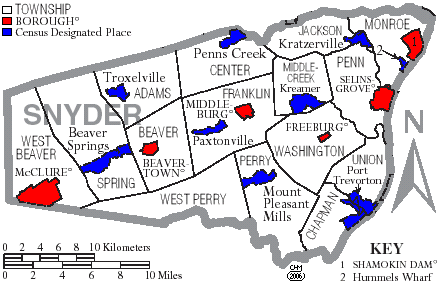
Map of Snyder County, Pennsylvania with Municipal Labels showing Boroughs (red), Townships (white), and Census-designated places (blue).

Center Township is a township in Snyder County, Pennsylvania, United States. The population was 2,416 at the 2020 census.

== History ==
Center Township was settled in 1745. It was incorporated in April 1805 from portions of Penn and Beaver Townships.

== Geography ==
According to the United States Census Bureau, the township has a total area of 21.3 square miles (55 km^{2}), all land.

Center Township is bordered by Union County to the north, Jackson and Middlecreek Townships to the east, Franklin Townships to the south and Adams Township to the west.

The census-designated place of Penns Creek is situated along the northern border of the township.

It is predominantly a rural township, approximately one hour north of the state capital of Harrisburg. Pennsylvania Route 104 runs through the town of Penns Creek in the township. It is in proximity to U.S. Route 522 and U.S. Route 11/15.

== Demographics ==
Historical population
Census	Pop.	Note	%±
2010	2,458		—
2020	2,416		−1.7%
2022 (est.)	2,423		0.3%
U.S. Decennial Census

As of the census of 2000, there were 2,162 people, 732 households, and 575 families residing in the township. The population density was 101.5 inhabitants per square mile (39.2/km^{2}). There were 778 housing units at an average density of 36.5 per square mile (14.1/km^{2}). The racial makeup of the township was 98.61% White, 0.51% African American, 0.28% Native American, 0.05% Pacific Islander, 0.19% from other races, and 0.37% from two or more races. Hispanic or Latino of any race were 0.51% of the population.

There were 732 households, out of which 37.8% had children under the age of 18 living with them, 68.0% were married couples living together, 6.8% had a female householder with no husband present, and 21.4% were non-families. 17.2% of all households were made up of individuals, and 6.6% had someone living alone who was 65 years of age or older. The average household size was 2.88 and the average family size was 3.25.

In the township the population was spread out, with 28.5% under the age of 18, 10.9% from 18 to 24, 30.2% from 25 to 44, 21.7% from 45 to 64, and 8.6% who were 65 years of age or older. The median age was 33 years. For every 100 females, there were 97.8 males. For every 100 females age 18 and over, there were 99.9 males.

The median income for a household in the township was $34,570, and the median income for a family was $38,875. Males had a median income of $29,250 versus $17,581 for females. The per capita income for the township was $13,240. About 7.3% of families and 10.4% of the population were below the poverty line, including 13.1% of those under age 18 and 9.7% of those age 65 or over.

== Parks ==
The Keene Community Park is located in the township.
