= Jackson Township, Snyder County, Pennsylvania =

Township in Pennsylvania, United States

- Township
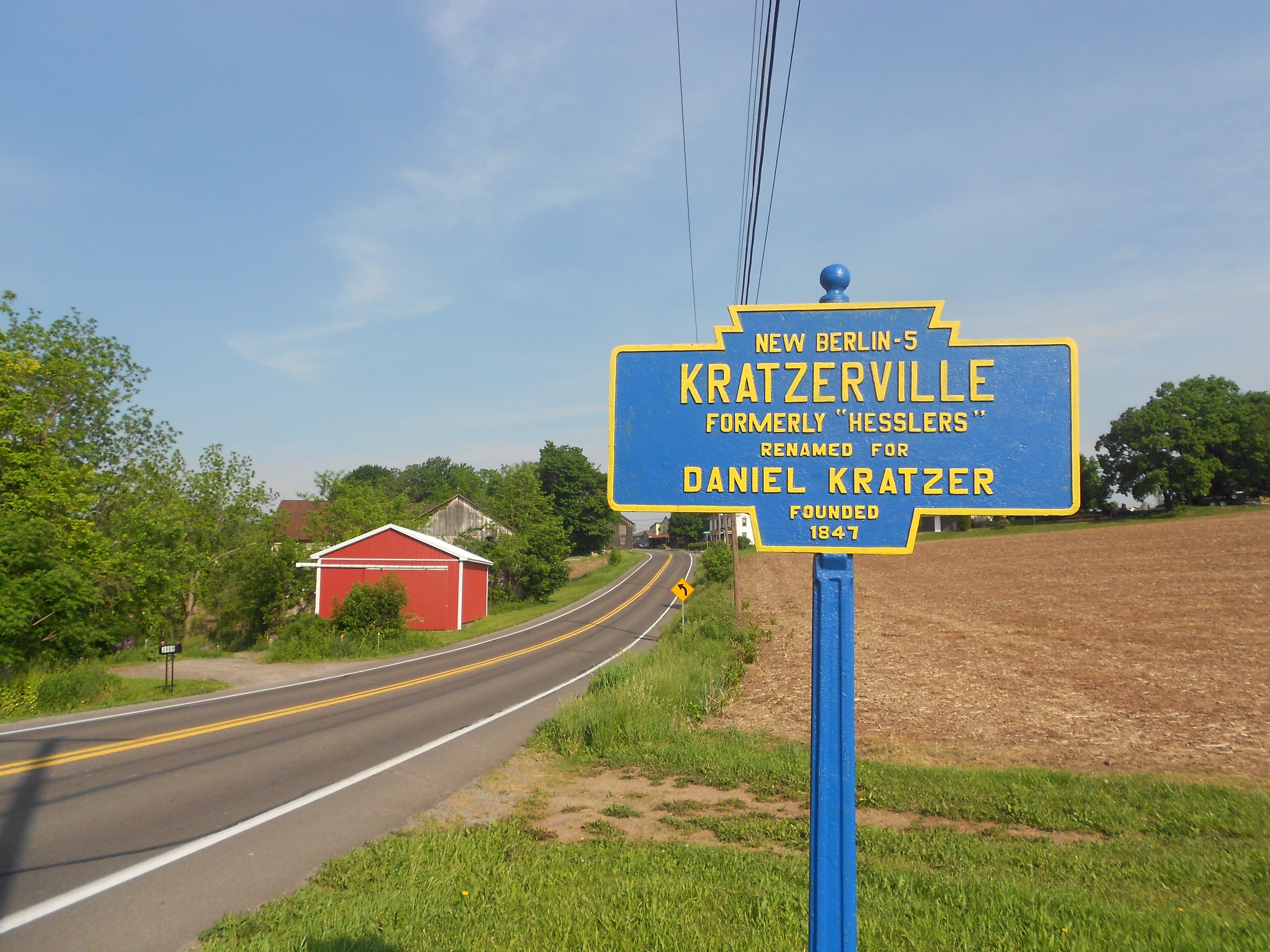
- Keystone Marker for Kratzerville

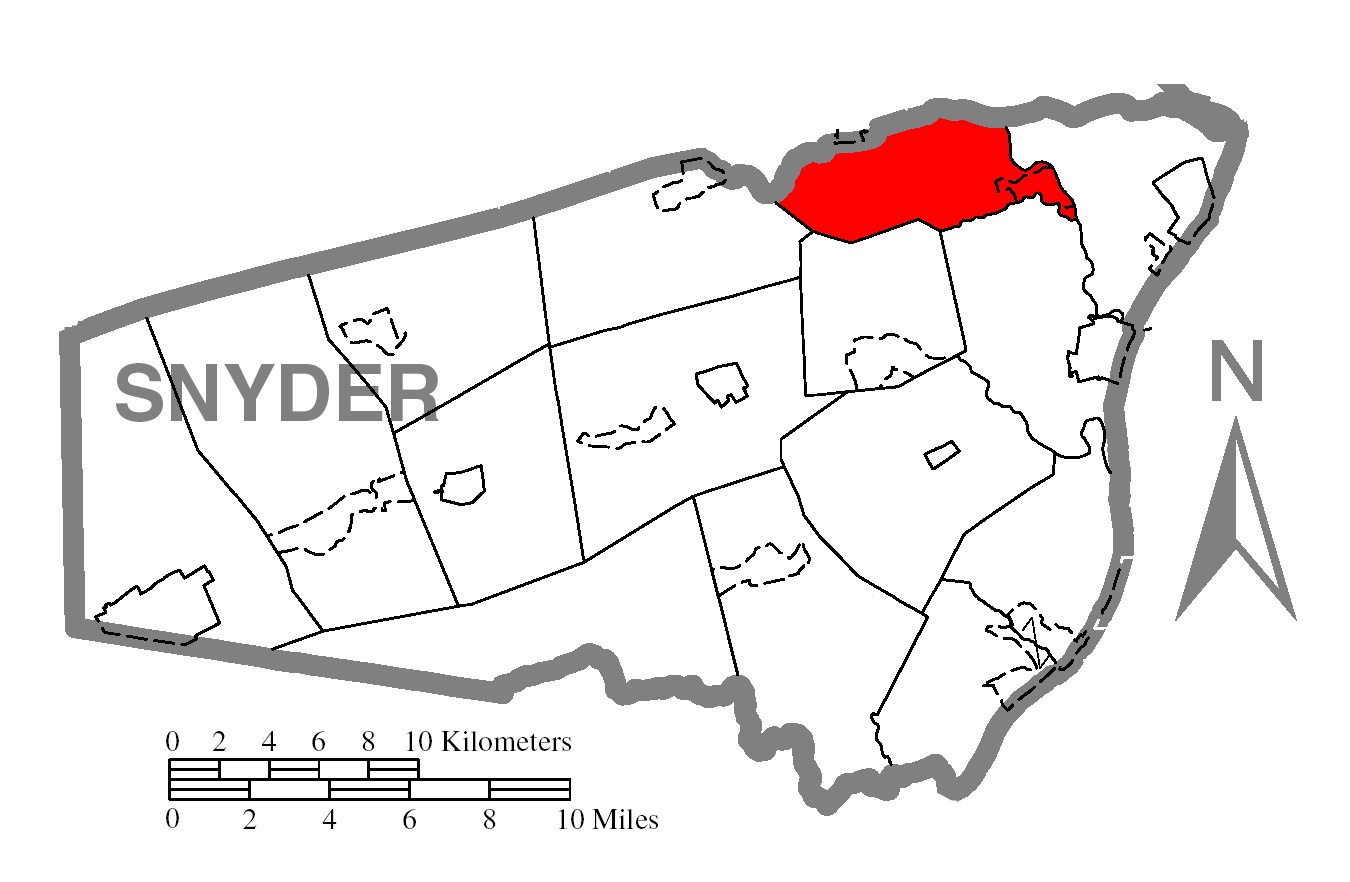
- Map of Snyder County, Pennsylvania highlighting Jackson Township

- Map of Snyder County, Pennsylvania
- Coordinates: 40°52′36″N 76°55′59″W
- Country: United States
- State: Pennsylvania
- County: Snyder
- Settled: 1745
- Incorporated: 1854

Area
  - Total: 14.83 sq mi (38.42 km^{2})
  - Land: 14.54 sq mi (37.65 km^{2})
  - Water: 0.30 sq mi (0.78 km^{2})

Population (2020)
  - Total: 1,586 ▲
  - Estimate (2022): 1,599
  - Density: 99/sq mi (38.2/km^{2})
- Time zone: UTC-5 (Eastern (EST))
  - Summer (DST): UTC-4 (EDT)
- FIPS code: 42-109-37448
- Website: https://jacksontwpsnyderco.org/

Jackson Township is a township in Snyder County, Pennsylvania, United States. The population was 1,586 at the 2020 census.

== Geography ==
According to the United States Census Bureau, the township has a total area of 15.1 square miles (39 km^{2}), all land.

Jackson Township is bordered by Union County to the north, Monroe Township to the east, Penn and Middlecreek Townships to the south and Center Township to the west.

The census-designated place of Kratzerville is in the southeastern corner of the township.

== Demographics ==
Historical population
Census	Pop.	Note	%±
2010	1,382		—
2020	1,586		14.8%
2022 (est.)	1,599		0.8%
U.S. Decennial Census

As of the census of 2000, there were 1,276 people, 459 households, and 379 families residing in the township. The population density was 84.7 inhabitants per square mile (32.7/km^{2}). There were 524 housing units at an average density of 34.8 per square mile (13.4/km^{2}). The racial makeup of the township was 98.43% White, 0.71% African American, 0.24% Asian, 0.47% from other races, and 0.16% from two or more races. Hispanic or Latino of any race were 0.71% of the population.

There were 459 households, out of which 32.0% had children under the age of 18 living with them, 72.1% were married couples living together, 7.4% had a female householder with no husband present, and 17.4% were non-families. 14.4% of all households were made up of individuals, and 5.4% had someone living alone who was 65 years of age or older. The average household size was 2.78 and the average family size was 3.04.

In the township the population was spread out, with 24.9% under the age of 18, 9.1% from 18 to 24, 28.3% from 25 to 44, 26.0% from 45 to 64, and 11.7% who were 65 years of age or older. The median age was 39 years. For every 100 females there were 100.6 males. For every 100 females age 18 and over, there were 94.7 males.

The median income for a household in the township was $33,611, and the median income for a family was $36,250. Males had a median income of $28,482 versus $20,938 for females. The per capita income for the township was $15,131. About 6.0% of families and 8.9% of the population were below the poverty line, including 15.1% of those under age 18 and 10.1% of those age 65 or over.

== Government ==
The polling place for Jackson Township is located in the volunteer fire department in Kratzerville.
