= Aline Covered Bridge =

- U.S. National Register of Historic Places
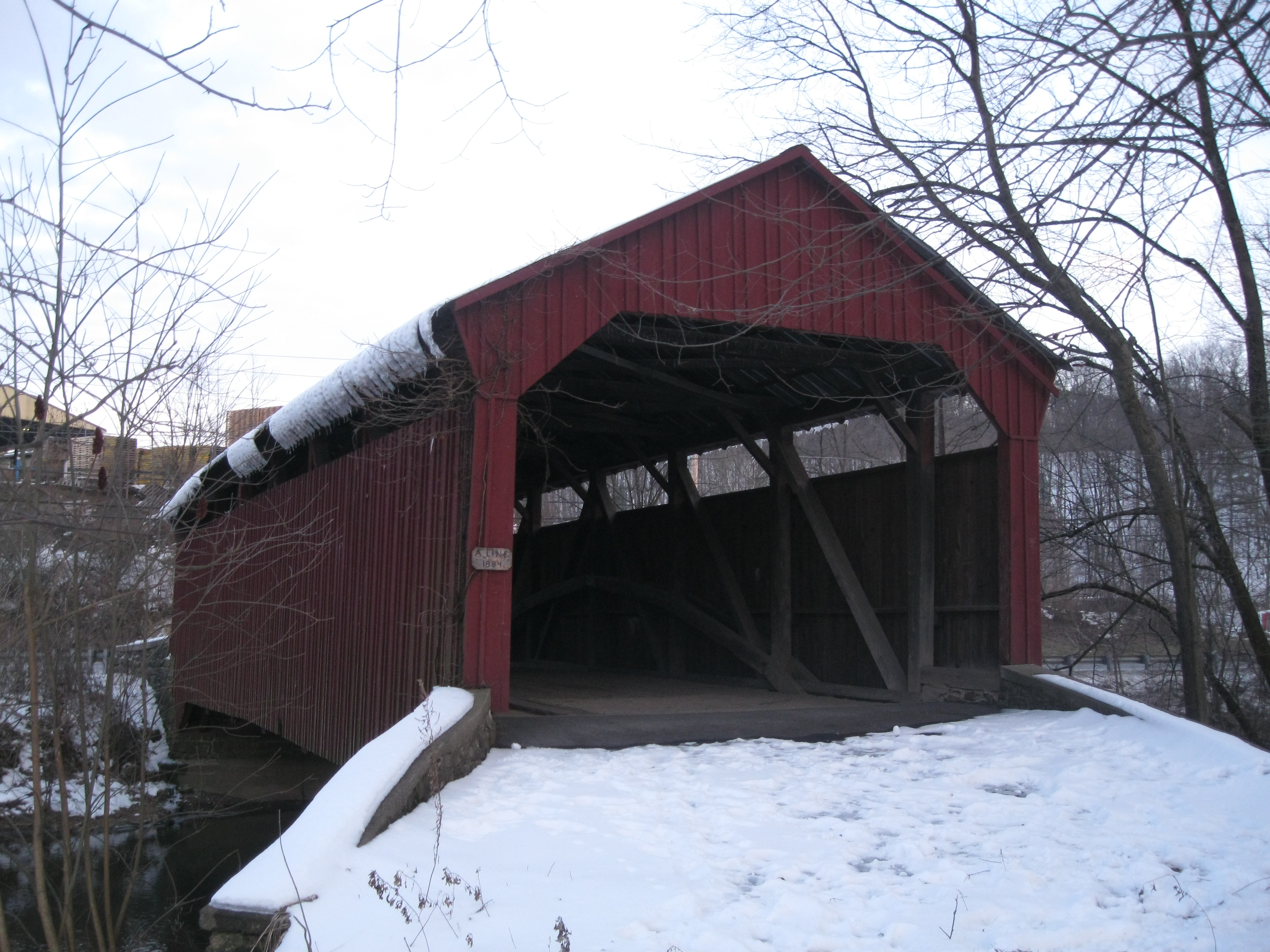
- The bridge in 2013

- Location within Pennsylvania Location within the United States
- Location: NW of Meiserville, Perry Townships, Meiserville, Pennsylvania
- Coordinates: 40°40′35″N 76°58′46″W
- Area: 0.1 acres (0.040 ha)
- Built: 1884
- Architectural style: Burr arch
- MPS: Covered Bridges of Juniata and Snyder Counties TR
- NRHP reference No.: 79002344
- Added to NRHP: August 10, 1979

The Aline Covered Bridge, also known as Meiserville Covered Bridge, is a historic covered bridge located in Perry Township near Meiserville in Snyder County, Pennsylvania. It is a 60-foot-long (18 m) Burr Truss bridge built in 1884. It crosses the North Branch of Mahantango Creek.

In 1982 a new bridge was built to bypass the covered bridge, which is open only to pedestrian traffic. A round picnic table sits in the middle of the bridge. It was listed on the National Register of Historic Places in 1979.

== See also ==
- National Register of Historic Places listings in Snyder County, Pennsylvania
