= Kreamer, Pennsylvania =

Unincorporated community in Pennsylvania, US

Kreamer
- Census-designated place
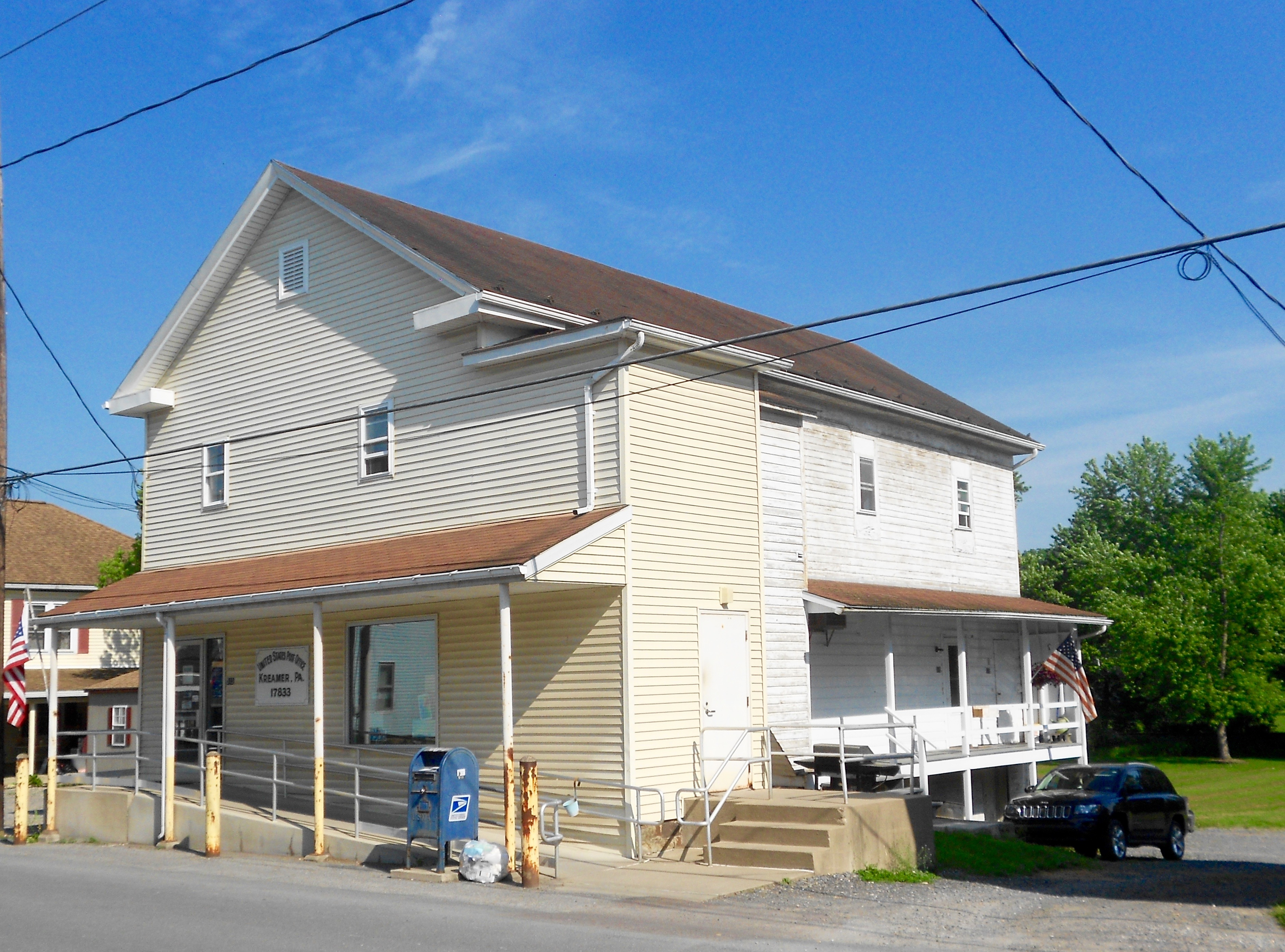
- Post office

- Location within the U.S. state of Pennsylvania Kreamer (the United States)
- Coordinates: 40°48′6″N 76°58′5″W
- Country: United States
- State: Pennsylvania
- County: Snyder

Area
  - Total: 1.24 sq mi (3.22 km^{2})
  - Land: 1.24 sq mi (3.21 km^{2})
  - Water: 0.0039 sq mi (0.01 km^{2})

Population (2020)
  - Total: 742
  - Density: 598.4/sq mi (231.05/km^{2})
- Time zone: UTC-5 (Eastern (EST))
  - Summer (DST): UTC-4 (EDT)
- FIPS code: 42-40464

Kreamer is a census-designated place (CDP) in Middlecreek Township, Snyder County, Pennsylvania, United States. The population was 773 at the 2000 census.

In May 2019, Wood-Mode, a major local employer, shut down its cabinetmaking operation in Kreamer. Press reports indicated the unexpected closing of the county's largest single employer cost nine-hundred people their jobs.

In August 2019, Bill French purchased the assets of Wood-Mode, creating the company Wood-Mode LLC. By September 2022, there was 550 people employed at the company.

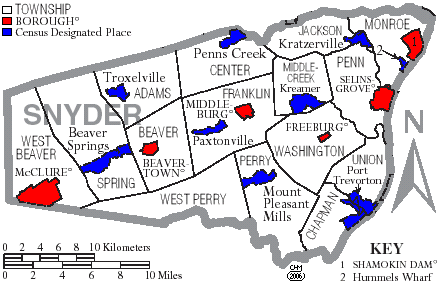
Map of Snyder County, Pennsylvania with Municipal Labels showing Boroughs (red), Townships (white), and Census-designated places (blue).

== Geography ==
Kreamer is located at 40°48′6″N 76°58′5″W (40.801754, -76.967920).

According to the United States Census Bureau, the CDP has a total area of 2.0 square miles (5.2 km^{2}), all land.

== Demographics ==
Historical population
Census	Pop.	Note	%±
2020	742		—
U.S. Decennial Census

As of the census of 2000, there were 773 people, 300 households, and 227 families residing in the CDP. The population density was 388.5 inhabitants per square mile (150.0/km^{2}). There were 308 housing units at an average density of 154.8 per square mile (59.8/km^{2}). The racial makeup of the CDP was 98.84% White, 0.13% African American, 0.13% Asian, 0.13% from other races, and 0.78% from two or more races. Hispanic or Latino of any race were 0.39% of the population.

There were 300 households, out of which 36.3% had children under the age of 18 living with them, 65.0% were married couples living together, 7.3% had a female householder with no husband present, and 24.3% were non-families. 20.0% of all households were made up of individuals, and 8.7% had someone living alone who was 65 years of age or older. The average household size was 2.58 and the average family size was 2.95.

In the CDP the population was spread out, with 26.1% under the age of 18, 6.5% from 18 to 24, 30.8% from 25 to 44, 24.5% from 45 to 64, and 12.2% who were 65 years of age or older. The median age was 37 years. For every 100 females there were 101.3 males. For every 100 females age 18 and over, there were 94.2 males.

The median income for a household in the CDP was $36,776, and the median income for a family was $42,692. Males had a median income of $31,210 versus $22,188 for females. The per capita income for the CDP was $17,667. About 2.3% of families and 4.9% of the population were below the poverty line, including 5.7% of those under age 18 and none of those age 65 or over.

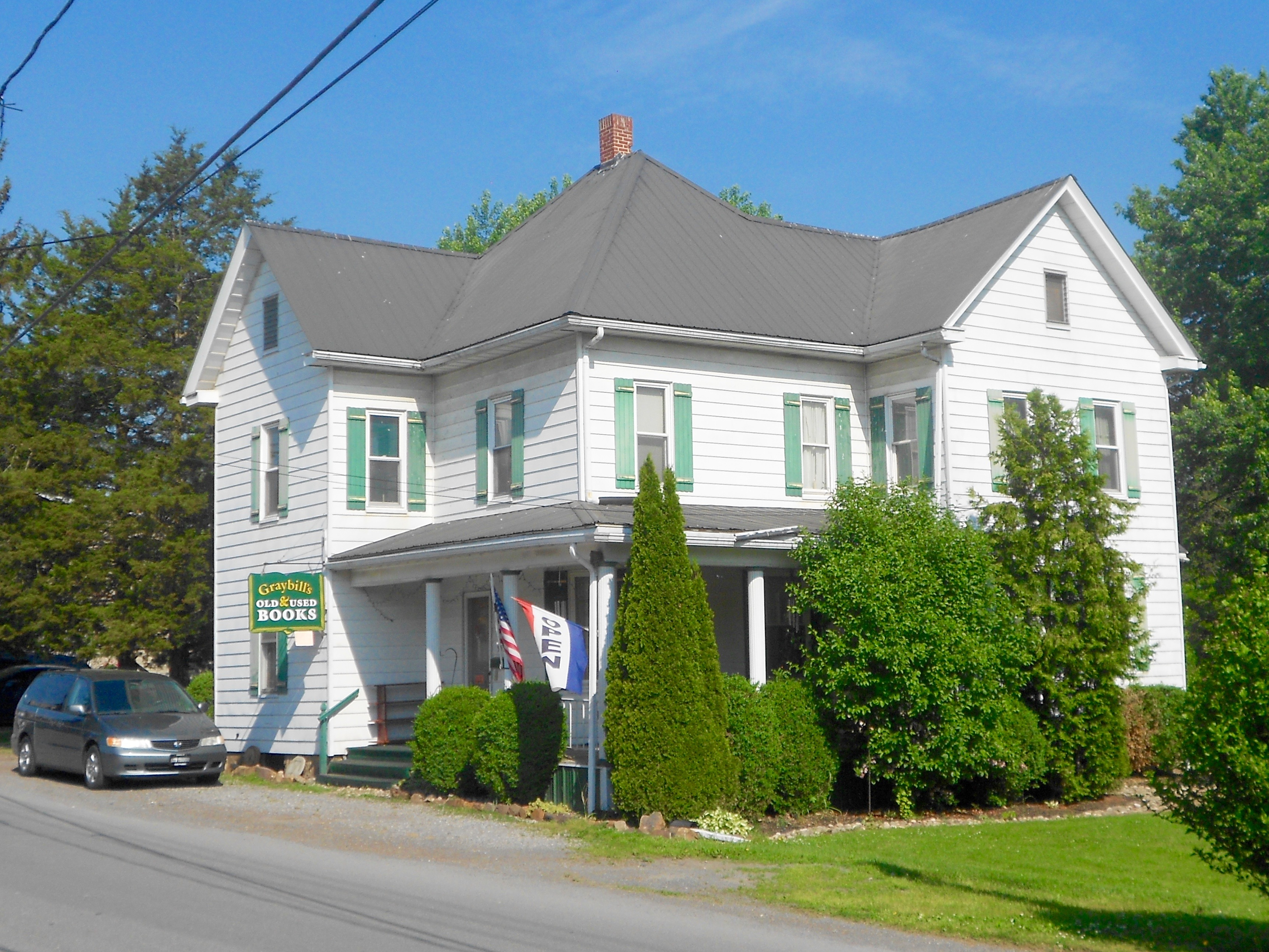
Bookstore

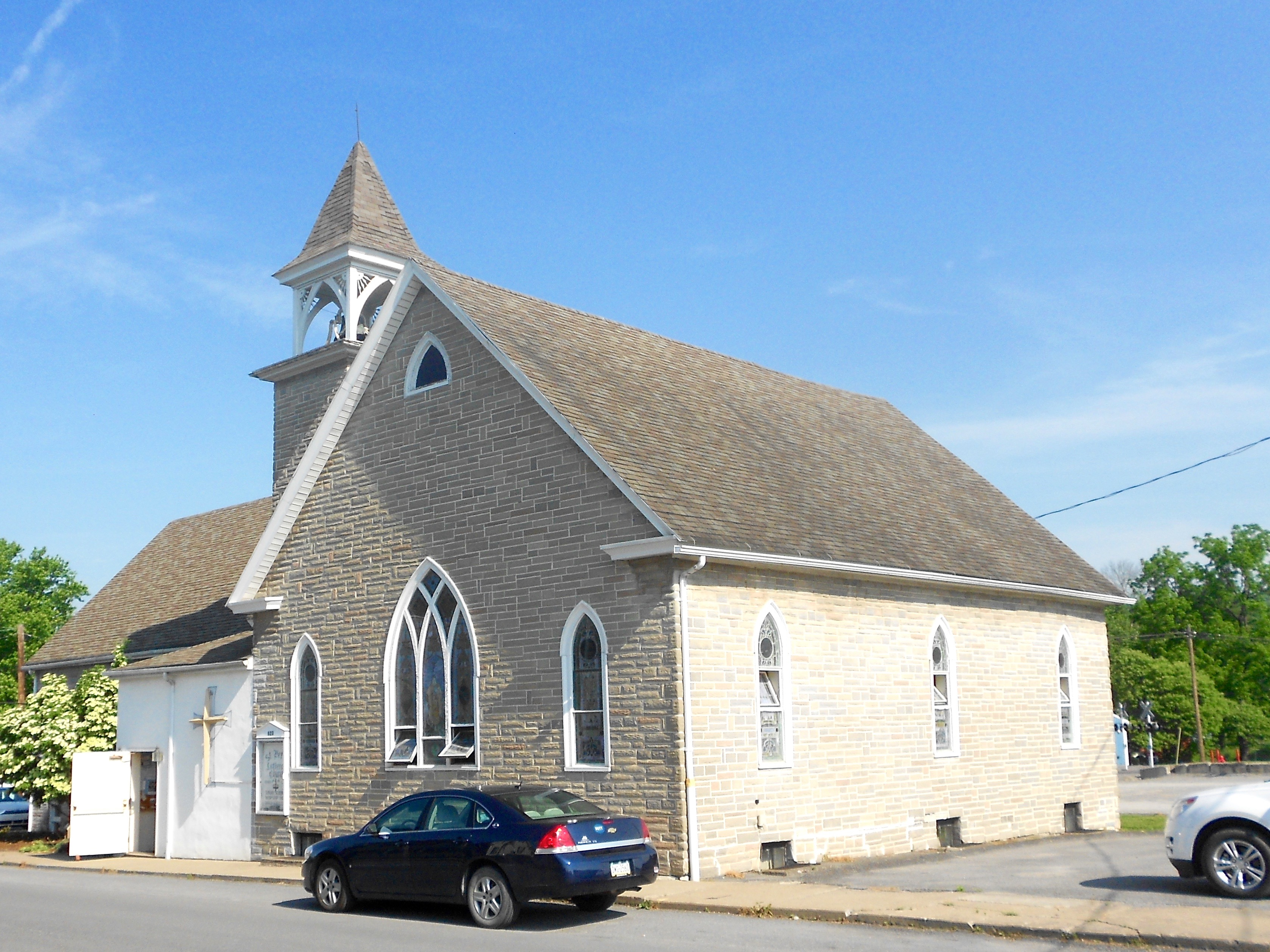
St. Peter's Lutheran Church
