= Middlecreek Township, Snyder County, Pennsylvania =

Township in Pennsylvania, United States

- Township
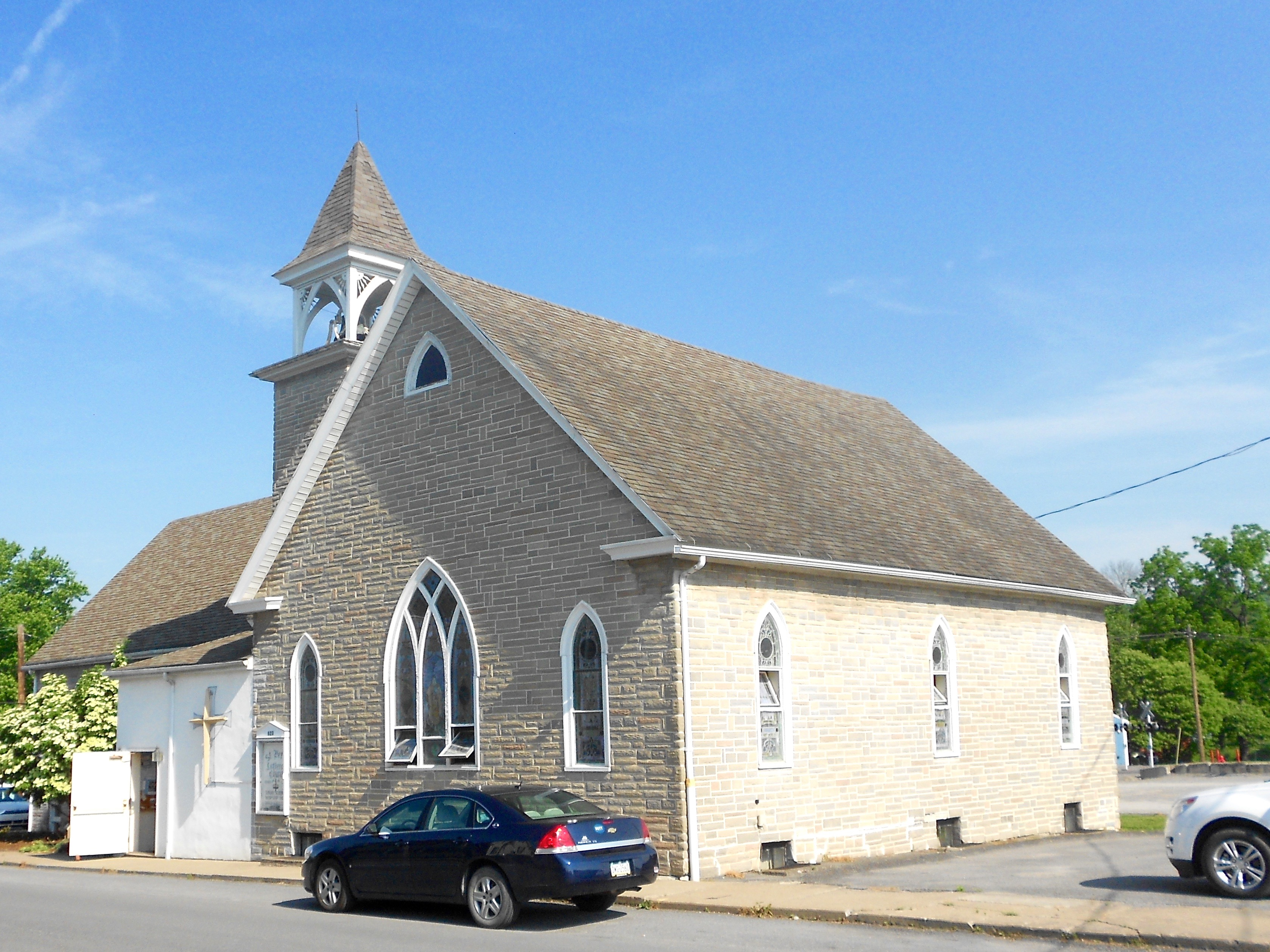
- St. Peter's Lutheran Church in Kreamer

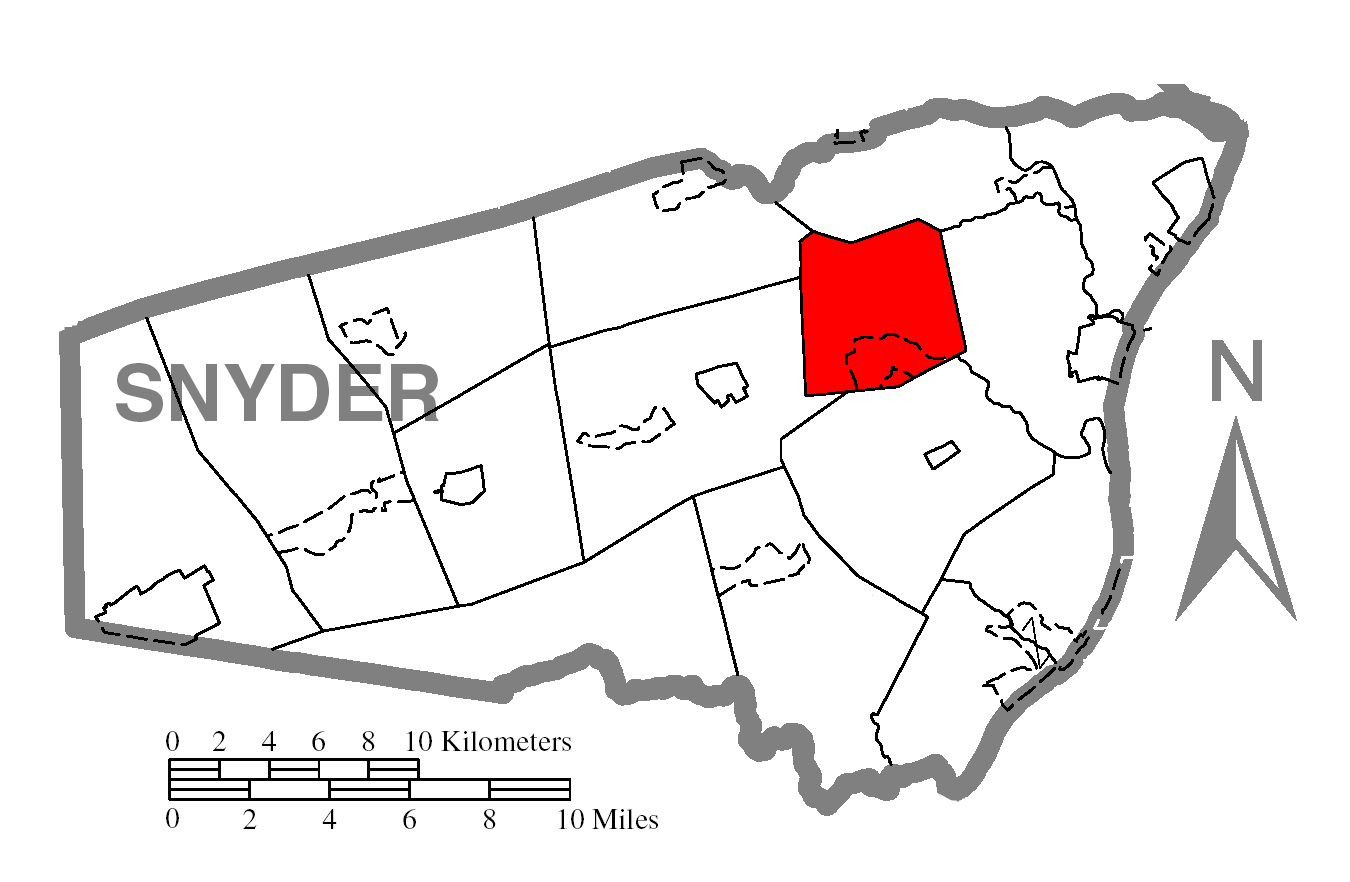
- Map of Snyder County, Pennsylvania highlighting Middlecreek Township

- Map of Snyder County, Pennsylvania
- Coordinates: 40°49′00″N 76°57′59″W
- Country: United States
- State: Pennsylvania
- County: Snyder
- Settled: 1745
- Incorporated: 1838

Government
  - Type: Board of Supervisors
  - Chairman: Richard E. Constant
  - Vice-Chairman: Judy A. Varner
  - Supervisor: Michael E. Smith

Area
  - Total: 14.51 sq mi (37.58 km^{2})
  - Land: 14.38 sq mi (37.25 km^{2})
  - Water: 0.13 sq mi (0.33 km^{2})

Population (2020)
  - Total: 2,055 ▼
  - Estimate (2022): 2,047
  - Density: 150.2/sq mi (58.01/km^{2})
- Time zone: UTC-5 (Eastern (EST))
  - Summer (DST): UTC-4 (EDT)
- Zip code: 17842
- Area code: 570
- FIPS code: 42-109-49016
- Website: Middle Creek Township

Middlecreek Township is a township in Snyder County, Pennsylvania, United States. The population was 2,055 at the 2020 census.

== Geography ==
According to the United States Census Bureau, the township has a total area of 14.4 square miles (37.2 km^{2}), of which 14.3 square miles (37.1 km^{2}) is land and 0.04 square mile (0.1 km^{2}) (0.14%) is water.

Middlecreek Township is bordered by Jackson Township to the north, Penn Township to the east, Washington Township to the south and Franklin and Center Townships to the west.

The census-designated place of Kreamer is in the southern part of the township.

== Demographics ==
Historical population
Census	Pop.	Note	%±
2010	2,114		—
2020	2,055		−2.8%
2022 (est.)	2,047		−0.4%
U.S. Decennial Census

As of the census of 2010, there were 2,114 people, 732 households, and 595 families residing in the township. The population density was 137.6 inhabitants per square mile (53.1/km^{2}). There were 754 housing units at an average density of 52.6 per square mile (20.3/km^{2}). The racial makeup of the township was 99.19% White, 0.10% African American, 0.10% Asian, 0.10% from other races, and 0.51% from two or more races. Hispanic or Latino of any race were 0.56% of the population.

There were 732 households, out of which 37.6% had children under the age of 18 living with them, 70.9% were married couples living together, 6.6% had a female householder with no husband present, and 18.7% were non-families. 15.4% of all households were made up of individuals, and 5.6% had someone living alone who was 65 years of age or older. The average household size was 2.69 and the average family size was 2.98.

In the township the population was spread out, with 26.0% under the age of 18, 7.6% from 18 to 24, 32.3% from 25 to 44, 24.5% from 45 to 64, and 9.5% who were 65 years of age or older. The median age was 36 years. For every 100 females there were 100.7 males. For every 100 females age 18 and over, there were 100.6 males.

The median income for a household in the township was $39,250, and the median income for a family was $42,460. Males had a median income of $30,262 versus $20,871 for females. The per capita income for the township was $16,005. About 4.8% of families and 5.9% of the population were below the poverty line, including 5.7% of those under age 18 and 4.9% of those age 65 or over.
