= Penns Creek, Pennsylvania =

Unincorporated community in Pennsylvania, US

Penns Creek
- Census-designated place
- Location within the U.S. state of Pennsylvania Penns Creek (the United States)
- Coordinates: 40°51′38″N 77°3′30″W
- Country: United States
- State: Pennsylvania
- County: Snyder

Area
  - Total: 0.75 sq mi (1.95 km^{2})
  - Land: 0.73 sq mi (1.90 km^{2})
  - Water: 0.019 sq mi (0.05 km^{2})

Population (2020)
  - Total: 694
  - Density: 946.0/sq mi (365.24/km^{2})
- Time zone: UTC-5 (Eastern (EST))
  - Summer (DST): UTC-4 (EDT)
- ZIP Code: 17862
- FIPS code: 42-59160

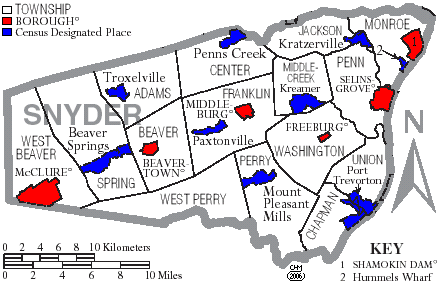
Map of Snyder County, Pennsylvania with municipal labels showing boroughs (red), townships (white), and census-designated places (blue)

Penns Creek is a census-designated place (CDP) in Center Township, Snyder County, Pennsylvania.

== Geography ==
Penns Creek is located at 40°51′38″N 77°3′30″W (40.860555, -77.058207), bordered on the north by its namesake creek, Penns Creek. It lies along PA Route 104 between Middleburg to the south and Mifflinburg to the north.

According to the U.S. Census Bureau, the CDP has a total area of 1.1 square miles (2.8 km^{2}), all land.

== Demographics ==
Historical population
Census	Pop.	Note	%±
2020	694		—
U.S. Decennial Census

As of the census of 2000, there were 668 people, 221 households, and 165 families residing in the CDP. The population density was 580.4 inhabitants per square mile (224.1/km^{2}). There were 231 housing units at an average density of 200.7 per square mile (77.5/km^{2}). The racial makeup of the CDP was 97.31% White, 1.20% African American, 0.60% Native American, 0.15% Pacific Islander, 0.45% from other races, and 0.30% from two or more races. Hispanic or Latino of any race were 1.05% of the population.

There were 221 households, out of which 38.0% had children under the age of 18 living with them, 60.2% were married couples living together, 10.4% had a female householder with no husband present, and 25.3% were non-families. 22.6% of all households were made up of individuals, and 7.7% had someone living alone who was 65 years of age or older. The average household size was 2.76 and the average family size was 3.24.

In the CDP, the population was spread out, with 27.5% under the age of 18, 17.1% from 18 to 24, 25.9% from 25 to 44, 21.1% from 45 to 64, and 8.4% who were 65 years of age or older. The median age was 31 years. For every 100 females, there were 89.8 males. For every 100 females age 18 and over, there were 87.6 males.

The median income for a household in the CDP was $28,500, and the median income for a family was $38,036. Males had a median income of $26,667 versus $18,971 for females. The per capita income for the CDP was $11,029. About 14.1% of families and 16.3% of the population were below the poverty line, including 23.5% of those under age 18 and 6.3% of those age 65 or over.

== History ==
The community was founded in 1806 by Lt. Col. George Weirick (1773–1838), a War of 1812 veteran and the son of Capt. Wilhelm Weirick (1731–1807), a veteran of the American Revolution, and grandson of German immigrant Johann Georg Weyrich (1702–1751). The village was originally called Weirickstown. Weirick served as county commissioner in 1824, justice of the peace in 1813, and as a member of the General Assembly of Pennsylvania (1832–1833). He is buried in the Salem Church Cemetery in Snyder County. The village name was later changed to Centreville, and then changed again due to a conflict with another village of the same name in Crawford County. The nearby creek's name was adopted sometime after 1842. The village was originally part of Northumberland County, then Union. On March 2, 1855, Penns Creek became part of Snyder County. Snyder County was named for Governor Simon Snyder of Selinsgrove. Buried in the old Sharon Lutheran Churchyard in Selinsgrove, Snyder was very popular and was the only governor of Pennsylvania to serve three terms.
