= Washington Township, Snyder County, Pennsylvania =

Township in Pennsylvania, United States

Coordinates: 40°44′00″N 76°57′59″W

- Township
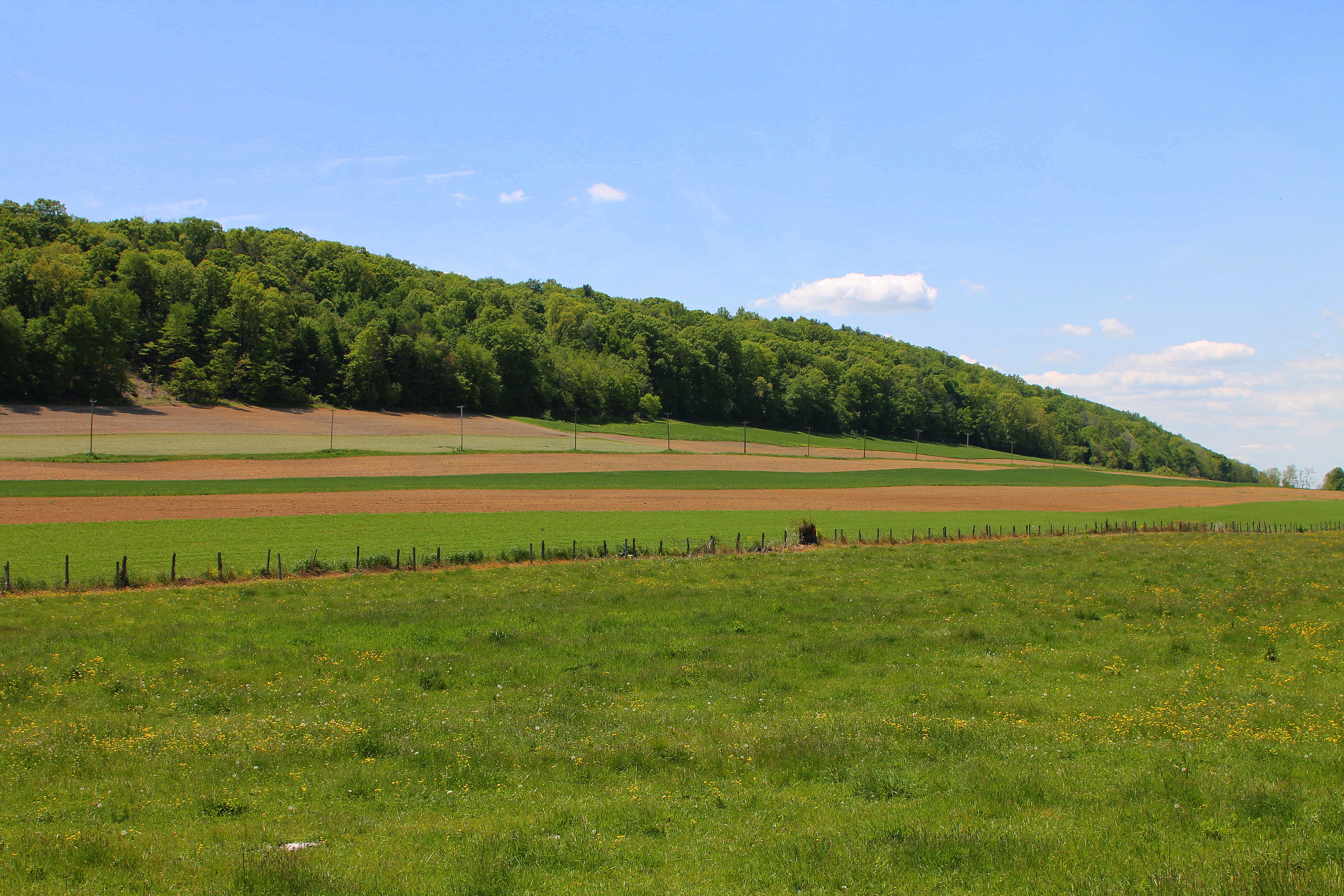
- Part of Pleasant Valley in Washington Township

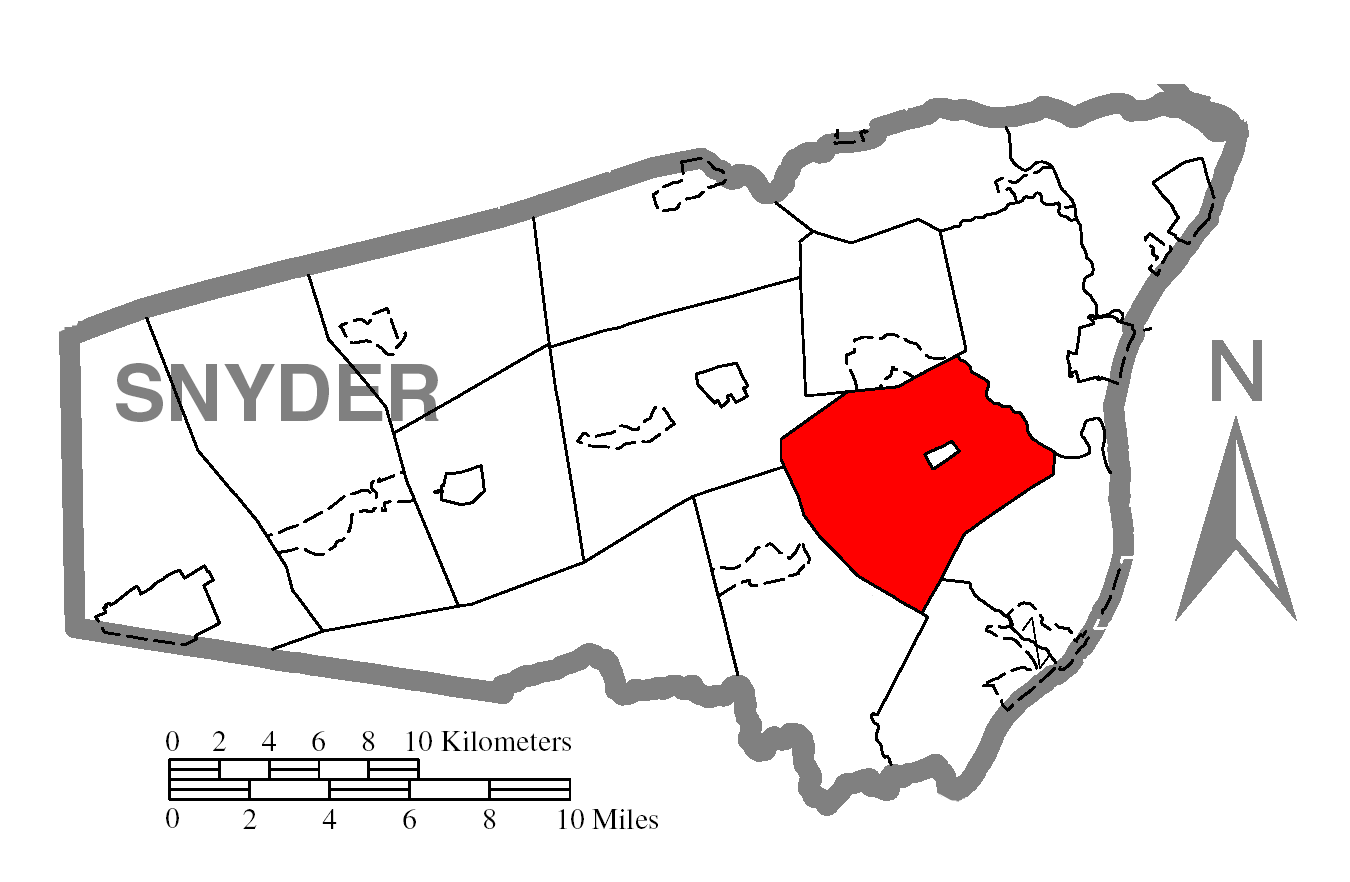
- Map of Snyder County, Pennsylvania highlighting Washington Township

- Map of Snyder County, Pennsylvania
- Country: United States
- State: Pennsylvania
- County: Snyder
- Incorporated: 1818

Area
  - Total: 24.16 sq mi (62.58 km^{2})
  - Land: 24.04 sq mi (62.27 km^{2})
  - Water: 0.12 sq mi (0.31 km^{2})

Population (2020)
  - Total: 1,759 ▲
  - Estimate (2022): 1,758
  - Density: 70.1/sq mi (27.08/km^{2})
- Time zone: UTC-5 (Eastern (EST))
  - Summer (DST): UTC-4 (EDT)
- Area code: 570
- FIPS code: 42-109-81320

Washington Township is a township in Snyder County, Pennsylvania, United States. The population was 1,759 at the 2020 census.

== Geography ==
According to the United States Census Bureau, the township has a total area of 24.5 square miles (63.5 km^{2}), of which 24.5 square miles (63.3 km^{2}) is land and 0.1 square mile (0.2 km^{2}) (0.24%) is water.

Washington Township is bordered by Middlecreek Township to the north, Penn Township to the northeast, Union and Chapman Townships to the southeast, Perry Township to the southwest, and Franklin Township to the west.

The borough of Freeburg is located in the center of the township.

== Demographics ==
Historical population
| Census | Pop. | Note | %± |
|---|---|---|---|
| 2010 | 1,654 | | — |
| 2020 | 1,759 | | 6.3% |
| 2022 (est.) | 1,758 | | −0.1% |
U.S. Decennial Census

As of the census of 2000, there were 1,532 people, 533 households, and 424 families residing in the township. The population density was 62.7 inhabitants per square mile (24.2/km^{2}). There were 566 housing units at an average density of 23.1/sq mi (8.9/km^{2}). The racial makeup of the township was 98.83% White, 0.07% African American, 0.20% Asian, 0.07% from other races, and 0.85% from two or more races. Hispanic or Latino of any race were 0.39% of the population.

There were 533 households, out of which 38.3% had children under the age of 18 living with them, 69.4% were married couples living together, 7.3% had a female householder with no husband present, and 20.3% were non-families. 14.6% of all households were made up of individuals, and 6.4% had someone living alone who was 65 years of age or older. The average household size was 2.87 and the average family size was 3.23.

In the township the population was spread out, with 28.9% under the age of 18, 6.1% from 18 to 24, 31.1% from 25 to 44, 23.6% from 45 to 64, and 10.2% who were 65 years of age or older. The median age was 36 years. For every 100 females, there were 104.0 males. For every 100 females age 18 and over, there were 101.7 males.

The median income for a household in the township was $39,091, and the median income for a family was $41,765. Males had a median income of $31,279 versus $21,000 for females. The per capita income for the township was $16,766. About 8.9% of families and 11.8% of the population were below the poverty line, including 16.1% of those under age 18 and 12.8% of those age 65 or over.
