= McKees Half Falls, Pennsylvania =

Unincorporated community in Pennsylvania, U.S.

Coordinates: 40°39′41″N 76°55′05″W

McKees Half Falls is an unincorporated community in Snyder County, in the U.S. state of Pennsylvania.

== History ==
The community was named after Thomas McKee, a fur trader who settled at this site with his wife Margaret Tecumsepah Opessa McKee near the rapids on the Susquehanna River. A variant name is "McKee Half Falls".
