= Kissimmee, Pennsylvania =

- Unincorporated community
- Location within the state of Pennsylvania Kissimmee, Pennsylvania (the United States)
- Coordinates: 40.7954°N 77.0853°W
- Country: United States
- State: Pennsylvania
- County: Snyder
- Time zone: UTC−05:00 (Eastern (EST))
  - Summer (DST): UTC−04:00 (EDT)
- GNIS feature ID: 1178557

Kissimmee is a small town located in Snyder County, Pennsylvania.
