= Perry Township, Snyder County, Pennsylvania =

Township in Pennsylvania, United States

Coordinates: 40°40′00″N 76°58′59″W

Perry Township Building, Snyder County, Pennsylvania
- Township
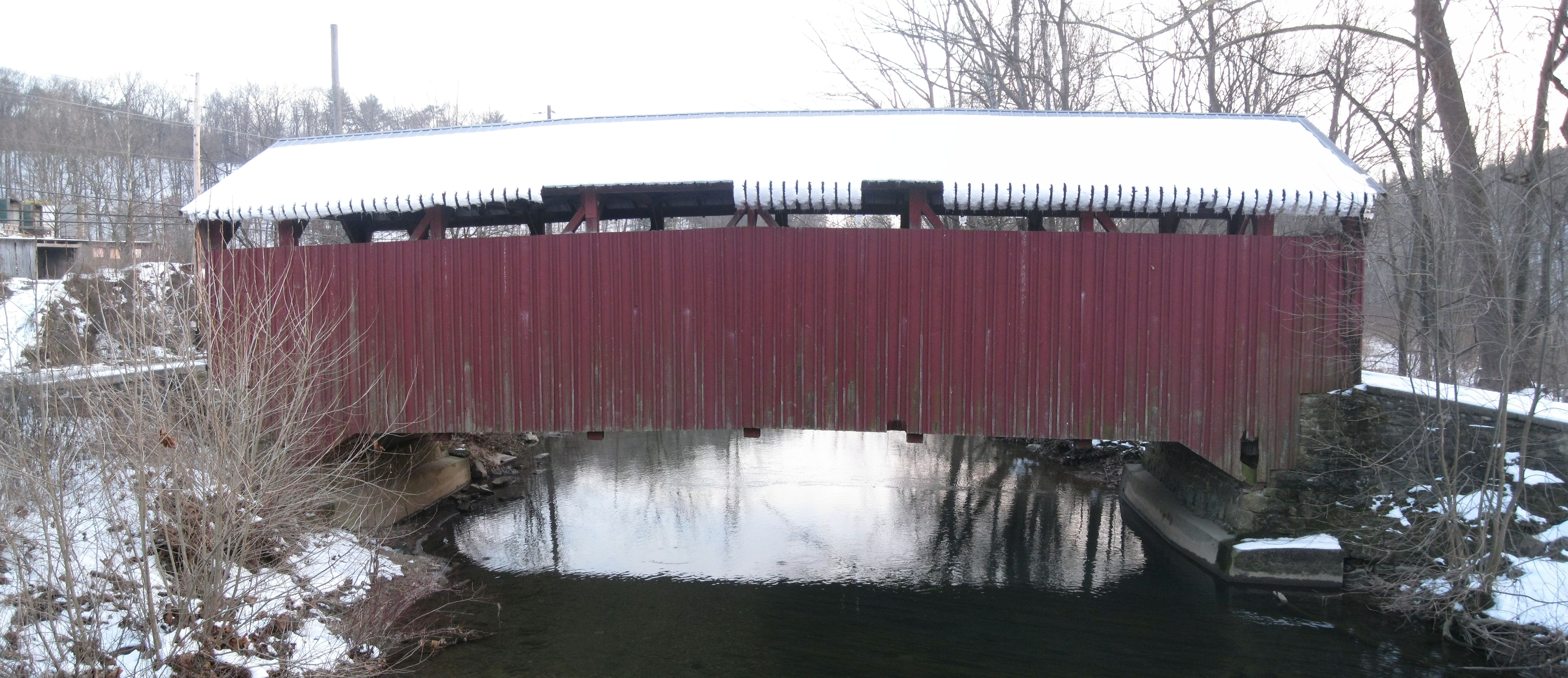
- Aline Covered Bridge over the North Branch of Mahantango Creek

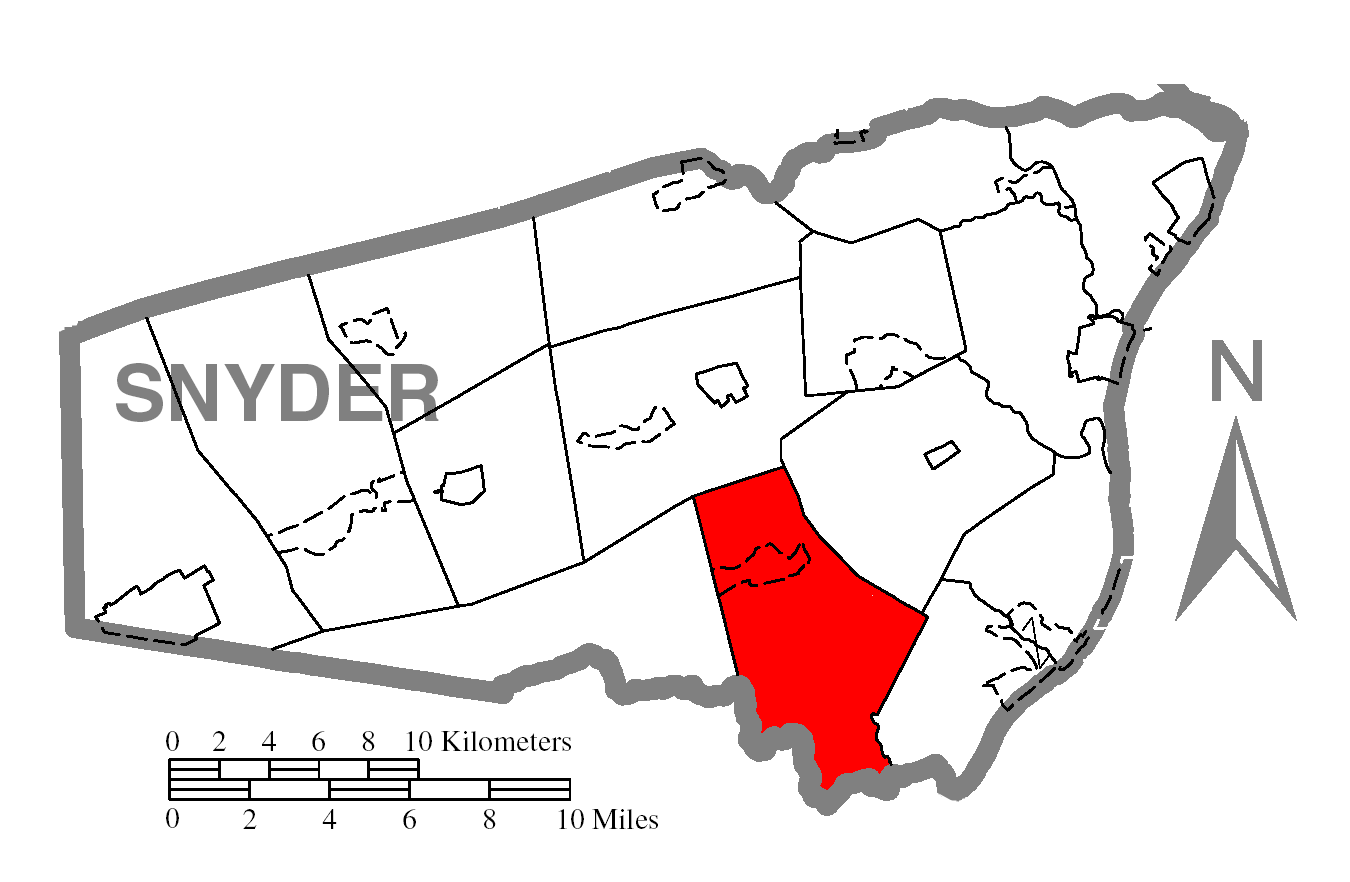
- Map of Snyder County, Pennsylvania highlighting Perry Township

- Map of Snyder County, Pennsylvania
- Country: United States
- State: Pennsylvania
- County: Snyder
- Settled: 1752
- Incorporated: 1816

Government
  - Type: Board of Supervisors
  - Chairman: Aaron J. Troup
  - Vice-Chairman: Nicholas A. Weader
  - Supervisor: Eric J. Vanhorn

Area
  - Total: 26.41 sq mi (68.39 km^{2})
  - Land: 26.31 sq mi (68.13 km^{2})
  - Water: 0.10 sq mi (0.27 km^{2})

Population (2020)
  - Total: 2,064 ▼
  - Estimate (2022): 2,047
  - Density: 84.0/sq mi (32.45/km^{2})
- Time zone: UTC-5 (Eastern (EST))
  - Summer (DST): UTC-4 (EDT)
- Zip code: 17853
- Area code: 570
- FIPS code: 42-109-59504
- Website: Perry Township

Perry Township is a township in Snyder County, Pennsylvania, United States. As of the 2020 census, the township population was 2,064.

== Geography ==
According to the United States Census Bureau, the township has a total area of 26.1 square miles (67.7 km^{2}), all land.

Perry Township is bordered by Franklin Township to the north, Washington Township to the northeast, Chapman Township to the southeast, Juniata County to the south and West Perry Township to the west.

The census-designated place of Mount Pleasant Mills lies within the borders of Perry Township.

== Government ==
The polling place for Perry Township is the Fremont Fire Hall.

Perry Township Building is in the 82nd Legislative District for the Pennsylvania General Assembly held by C. Adam Harris whose office is located on Main St., Middleburg. Pennsylvania Senate District 27 is held by Senator John Gordner. Perry Township Building is in the United States House of Representatives 10th District held by Rep. Chris Carney. Pennsylvania is represented in the United States Senate by Senator Bob Casey, Jr. and Senator Arlen Specter.

Perry Township Building is located at 18 Hoffman Hill Road, Mt. Pleasant Mills, PA 17853 and served by a Board of Supervisors. They are:

Aaron J. Troup, Chairman & Roadmaster: 2584 Pine Swamp Road Mt. Pleasant Mills, Pa 17853 570-539-4784

Nicholas A. Weader, Vice-Chairman: 6022 Flint Valley Road Mt. Pleasant Mills, PA 17853 570-539-4784

Erik J. Vanhorn, Supervisor: 22 Heister Valley Road Mt. Pleasant Mills, PA 17853 570-539-4784

== Schools ==
Midd-West School District is the area's public school system.

== History ==
Perry Township Building was incorporated in 1816. The area known as today's Perry Township was settled in 1752 as Mahantango Township. See also- Mahantango Creek, Snyder and Juniata Counties, Pennsylvania.

Mahantango, sometimes spelled as Mohentango, was on both sides of the Susquehanna River. It was split by The river; the Eastern portion became Mahanoy Twp, Northumberland County, the Western portion became Perry County. Before 1772, the area was named Lancaster County. After 1772 it was in Northumberland County. Today the Western portion is in what is today's Snyder County. Snyder County was formed in 1855, from Union County and Union County was formed in 1813 from Northumberland County, which was formed in 1772 from parts of Lancaster, Berks, Bedford, Cumberland, and Northampton Counties. The Aline Covered Bridge, East Oriental Covered Bridge, and North Oriental Covered Bridge were added to the National Register of Historic Places in 1979.

== Demographics ==
Historical population
Census	Pop.	Note	%±
2010	2,183		—
2020	2,064		−5.5%
2022 (est.)	2,047		−0.8%
U.S. Decennial Census

As of the census of 2000, there were 1,973 people, 686 households, and 539 families residing in the township. The population density was 75.5 inhabitants per square mile (29.2/km^{2}). There were 729 housing units at an average density of 27.9 per square mile (10.8/km^{2}). The racial makeup of the township was 99.24% White, 0.05% African American, 0.10% Asian, 0.05% from other races, and 0.56% from two or more races. Hispanic or Latino of any race were 0.41% of the population.

There were 686 households, out of which 36.2% had children under the age of 18 living with them, 68.7% were married couples living together, 5.8% had a female householder with no husband present, and 21.4% were non-families. 18.8% of all households were made up of individuals, and 7.9% had someone living alone who was 65 years of age or older. The average household size was 2.88 and the average family size was 3.28.

In the township the population was spread out, with 29.5% under the age of 18, 8.1% from 18 to 24, 29.0% from 25 to 44, 23.0% from 45 to 64, and 10.4% who were 65 years of age or older. The median age was 34 years. For every 100 females there were 105.1 males. For every 100 females age 18 and over, there were 99.7 males.

The median income for a household in the township was $35,167, and the median income for a family was $40,474. Males had a median income of $28,808 versus $21,667 for females. The per capita income for the township was $14,631. About 7.3% of families and 12.1% of the population were below the poverty line, including 17.9% of those under age 18 and 10.7% of those age 65 or over.

== Notable residents ==
- Francis Charles Portzline, fraktur artist
