= Freeburg, Pennsylvania =

Borough in Pennsylvania, US

- Borough
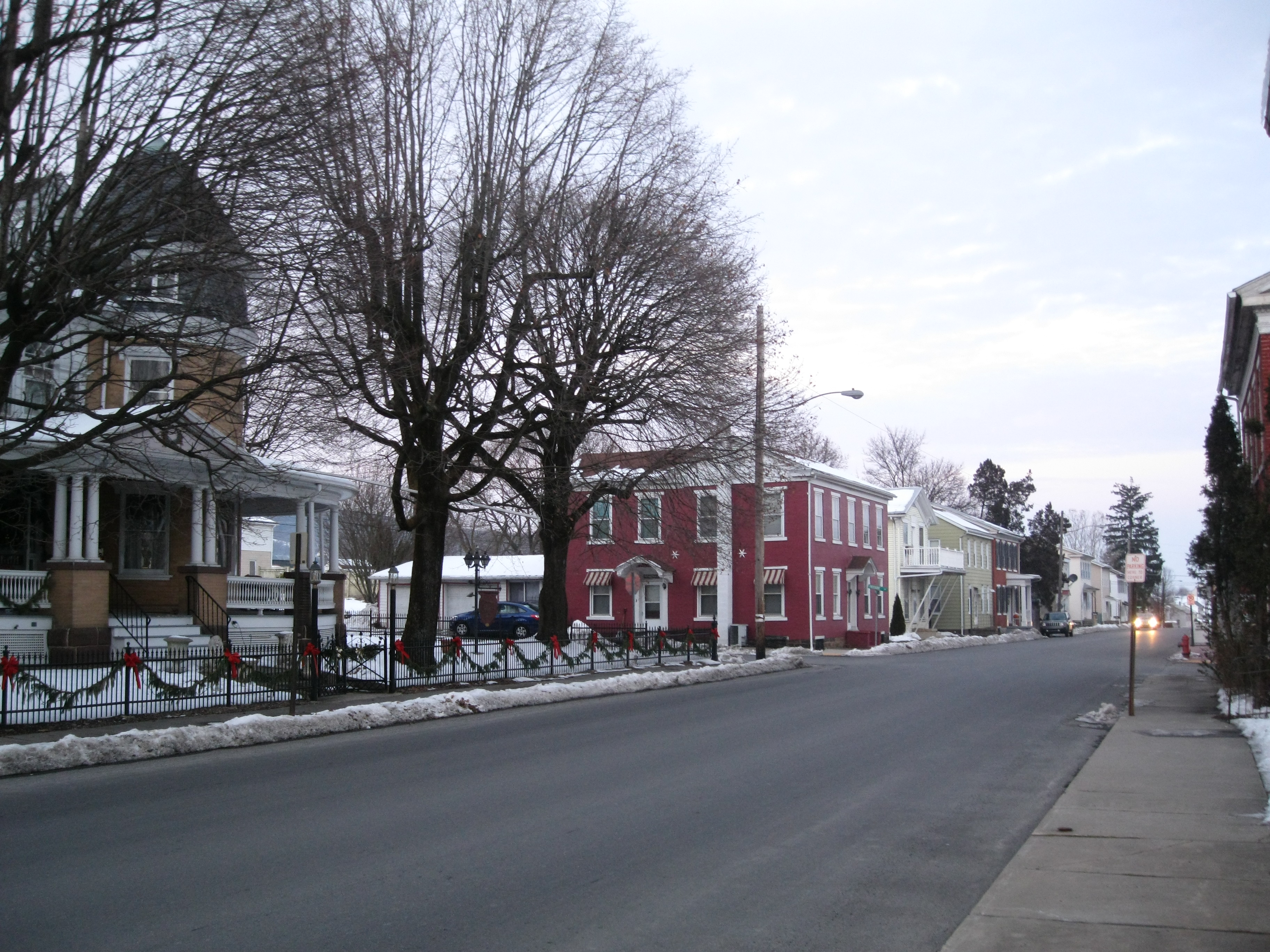
- Market Street (PA 35) in 2013

- Location of Freeburg in Snyder County, Pennsylvania.

- Location within the U.S. state of Pennsylvania Freeburg (the United States)
- Coordinates: 40°45′50″N 76°56′15″W
- Country: United States
- State: Pennsylvania
- County: Snyder
- Settled: 1796
- Incorporated (borough): 1920

Area
  - Total: 0.32 sq mi (0.83 km^{2})
  - Land: 0.32 sq mi (0.83 km^{2})
  - Water: 0 sq mi (0.00 km^{2})
- Elevation (center of borough): 525 ft (160 m)
- Highest elevation (western and northeastern borough boundary): 580 ft (180 m)
- Lowest elevation (Susquehecka Creek): 482 ft (147 m)

Population (2020)
  - Total: 557
  - Density: 1,746.8/sq mi (674.44/km^{2})
- Time zone: Eastern (EST)
  - Summer (DST): EDT
- ZIP code: 17827
- Area codes: 272 and 570
- FIPS code: 42-27696
- Website: https://freeburgborough.com/

Freeburg is a borough in Snyder County, Pennsylvania, United States. The population was 557 at the 2020 census.

== Geography ==
According to the United States Census Bureau, the borough has a total area of 0.3 square miles (0.78 km^{2}), all land.

Freeburg is surrounded by Washington Township.

== Demographics ==
Historical population
Census	Pop.	Note	%±
1880	523		—
1890	540		3.3%
1930	391		—
1940	467		19.4%
1950	506		8.4%
1960	575		13.6%
1970	636		10.6%
1980	643		1.1%
1990	640		−0.5%
2000	584		−8.7%
2010	575		−1.5%
2020	557		−3.1%
2021 (est.)	554	▼	−0.5%

As of the census of 2000, there were 584 people, 242 households, and 171 families residing in the borough. The population density was 2,066.6 inhabitants per square mile (797.9/km^{2}). There were 248 housing units at an average density of 877.6 per square mile (338.8/km^{2}). The racial makeup of the borough was 99.32% White, 0.34% African American, 0.17% Asian, and 0.17% from two or more races.

There were 242 households, out of which 28.5% had children under the age of 18 living with them, 56.2% were married couples living together, 7.4% had a female householder with no husband present, and 29.3% were non-families. 26.9% of all households were made up of individuals, and 15.3% had someone living alone who was 65 years of age or older. The average household size was 2.41 and the average family size was 2.86.

In the borough the population was spread out, with 23.6% under the age of 18, 7.0% from 18 to 24, 26.7% from 25 to 44, 23.6% from 45 to 64, and 19.0% who were 65 years of age or older. The median age was 40 years. For every 100 females there were 98.0 males. For every 100 females age 18 and over, there were 89.8 males.

The median income for a household in the borough was $30,729, and the median income for a family was $40,357. Males had a median income of $29,821 versus $20,625 for females. The per capita income for the borough was $15,893. About 4.5% of families and 9.1% of the population were below the poverty line, including 12.1% of those under age 18 and 8.7% of those age 65 or over.

== History ==
Andrew Straub circa 1796 laid out the village of Freeburg, Snyder County, which at first was known as 'Straubstown', but later changed to Freeburg. He donated a plot of land to form a church and graveyard. The graveyard is called the Evergreen Cemetery.
