= Franklin Township, Snyder County, Pennsylvania =

Township in Pennsylvania, United States

Coordinates: 40°44′00″N 77°04′59″W

- Township
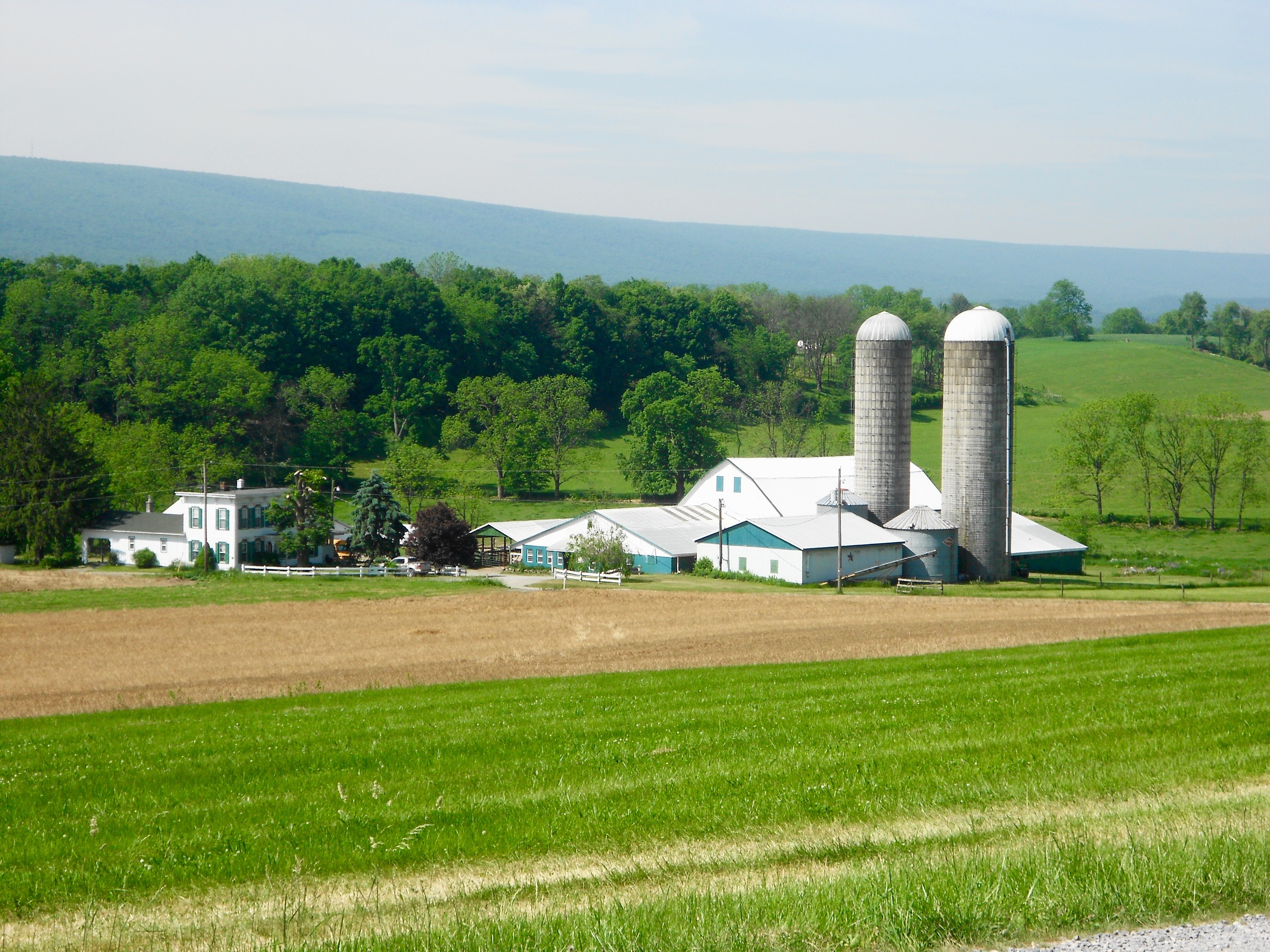
- Farm on Farmhaus Lane

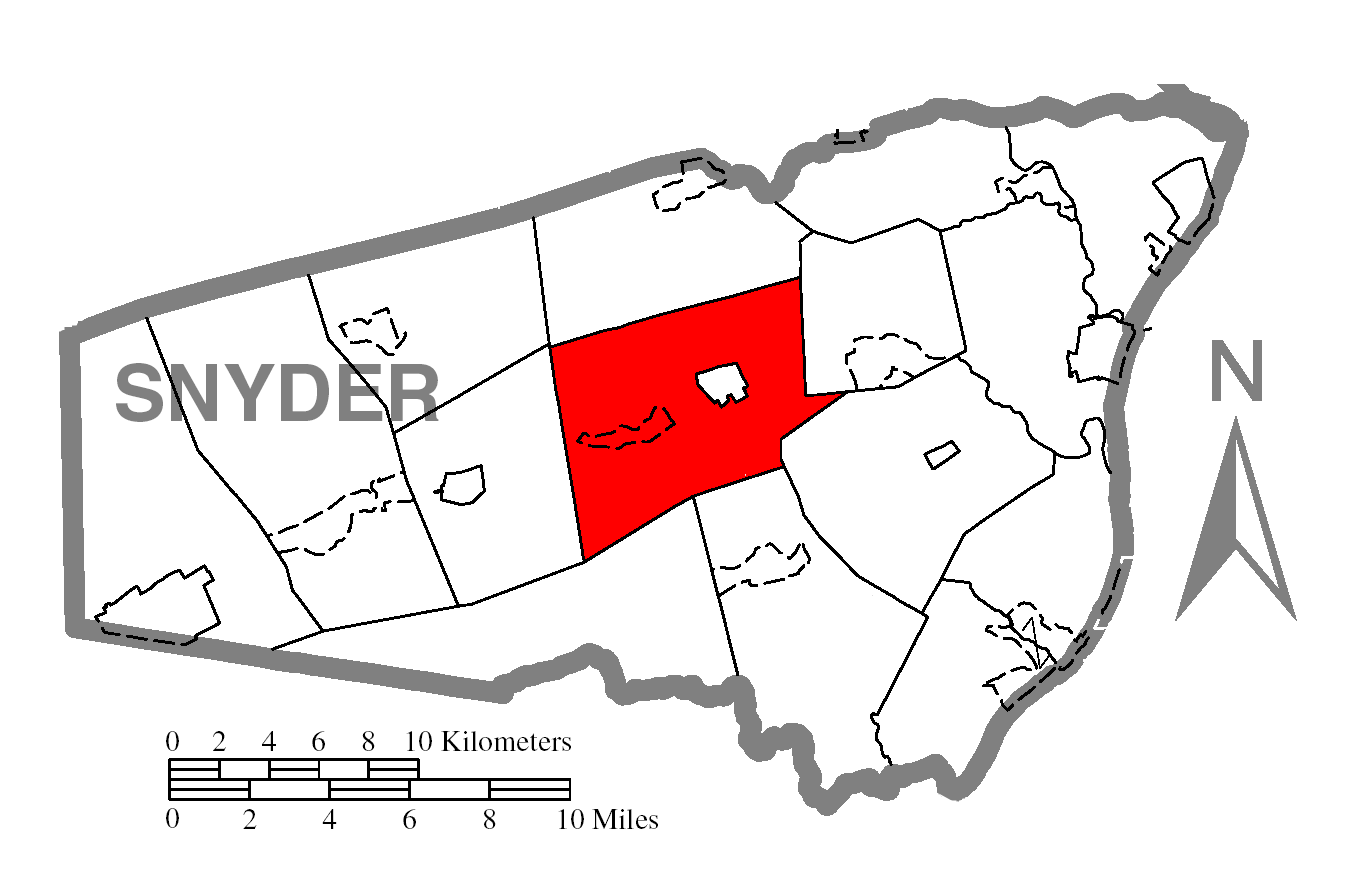
- Map of Snyder County, Pennsylvania highlighting Franklin Township

- Map of Snyder County, Pennsylvania
- Country: United States
- State: Pennsylvania
- County: Snyder
- Settled: 1748
- Incorporated: 1853

Area
  - Total: 28.07 sq mi (72.71 km^{2})
  - Land: 27.88 sq mi (72.20 km^{2})
  - Water: 0.19 sq mi (0.50 km^{2})

Population (2020)
  - Total: 2,204 ▼
  - Estimate (2022): 2,200
  - Density: 81.1/sq mi (31.31/km^{2})
- Time zone: UTC-5 (Eastern (EST))
  - Summer (DST): UTC-4 (EDT)
- FIPS code: 42-109-27440
- Website: https://www.franklintownshipsnydercounty.com/

Franklin Township is a township in Snyder County, Pennsylvania, United States. The population was 2,204 at the 2020 census.

== Geography ==
According to the United States Census Bureau, the township has a total area of 28.5 square miles (74 km^{2}), of which 28.5 square miles (74 km^{2}) is land and 0.04% is water.

Franklin Township is bordered by Center Township to the north, Middlecreek and Washington Townships to the east, Perry and West Perry Townships to the south and Beaver Township to the west.

Franklin Township surrounds the borough of Middleburg and contains the census-designated place of Paxtonville.

== Demographics ==
Historical population
Census	Pop.	Note	%±
2010	2,259		—
2020	2,204		−2.4%
2022 (est.)	2,200		−0.2%
U.S. Decennial Census

As of the census of 2000, there were 2,094 people, 835 households, and 632 families residing in the township. The population density was 73.6 inhabitants per square mile (28.4/km^{2}). There were 904 housing units at an average density of 31.8 per square mile (12.3/km^{2}). The racial makeup of the township was 99.86% White, 0.05% African American, 0.05% Native American, and 0.05% from two or more races. 0.43% of the population were Hispanic or Latino of any race.

There were 835 households, out of which 31.9% had children under the age of 18 living with them, 65.6% were married couples living together, 5.6% had a female householder with no husband present, and 24.2% were non-families. 21.2% of all households were made up of individuals, and 8.4% had someone living alone who was 65 years of age or older. The average household size was 2.51 and the average family size was 2.91.

In the township the population was spread out, with 23.9% under the age of 18, 7.0% from 18 to 24, 28.8% from 25 to 44, 27.4% from 45 to 64, and 12.9% who were 65 years of age or older. The median age was 39 years. For every 100 females, there were 95.9 males. For every 100 females age 18 and over, there were 95.9 males.

The median income for a household in the township was $34,583, and the median income for a family was $37,950. Males had a median income of $30,238 versus $18,684 for females. The per capita income for the township was $16,397. 11.7% of the population and 10.1% of families were below the poverty line. Out of the total population, 22.3% of those under the age of 18 and 12.5% of those 65 and older were living below the poverty line.

== Government ==
Franklin Township is in the 85th Legislative District for the Pennsylvania General Assembly held by David H. Rowe whose office is located in Middleburg. Pennsylvania Senate District 27 is held by Senator John Gordner. Franklin Township is in the United States House of Representatives 10th District held by Rep. David H Rowe. Pennsylvania is represented in the United States Senate by Senator Bob Casey, Jr. and Senator Pat Toomey.

== Education ==
Midd-West School District is the area's public school system.
