= Mount Pleasant Mills, Pennsylvania =

Unincorporated community in Pennsylvania, US

Mount Pleasant Mills
- Census-designated place
- Location within the U.S. state of Pennsylvania Mount Pleasant Mills (the United States)
- Coordinates: 40°43′25″N 77°1′2″W
- Country: United States
- State: Pennsylvania
- County: Snyder

Area
  - Total: 1.60 sq mi (4.15 km^{2})
  - Land: 1.60 sq mi (4.14 km^{2})
  - Water: 0.0039 sq mi (0.01 km^{2})

Population (2020)
  - Total: 453
  - Density: 283.6/sq mi (109.49/km^{2})
- Time zone: UTC-5 (Eastern (EST))
  - Summer (DST): UTC-4 (EDT)
- ZIP code: 17853
- Area codes: 570 and 272
- FIPS code: 42-51904

Mount Pleasant Mills is a census-designated place (CDP) in Perry Township, Snyder County, Pennsylvania, United States. The population was 342 at the 2000 census.

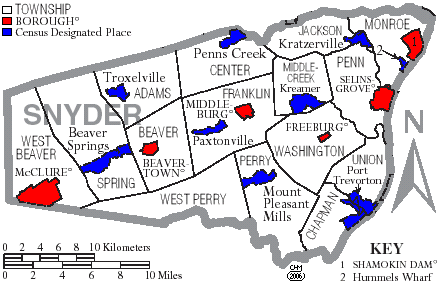
Map of Snyder County, Pennsylvania with Municipal Labels showing Boroughs (red), Townships (white), and Census-designated places (blue).

== Geography ==
Mount Pleasant Mills is located at 40°43′25″N 77°1′2″W (40.723635, -77.017216).

According to the United States Census Bureau, the CDP has a total area of 1.5 square miles (3.9 km^{2}), all land.

== Demographics ==
Historical population
Census	Pop.	Note	%±
2020	453		—
U.S. Decennial Census

As of the census of 2000, there were 342 people, 141 households, and 93 families residing in the CDP. The population density was 225.9 inhabitants per square mile (87.2/km^{2}). There were 152 housing units at an average density of 100.4 per square mile (38.8/km^{2}). The racial makeup of the CDP was 99.71% White, and 0.29% from two or more races.

There were 141 households, out of which 29.8% had children under the age of 18 living with them, 58.2% were married couples living together, 3.5% had a female householder with no husband present, and 34.0% were non-families. 29.8% of all households were made up of individuals, and 14.9% had someone living alone who was 65 years of age or older. The average household size was 2.43 and the average family size was 3.03.

In the CDP the population was spread out, with 25.7% under the age of 18, 8.8% from 18 to 24, 26.3% from 25 to 44, 24.0% from 45 to 64, and 15.2% who were 65 years of age or older. The median age was 37 years. For every 100 females there were 104.8 males. For every 100 females age 18 and over, there were 92.4 males.

The median income for a household in the CDP was $32,500, and the median income for a family was $36,250. Males had a median income of $30,694 versus $22,500 for females. The per capita income for the CDP was $15,180. About 8.7% of families and 13.3% of the population were below the poverty line, including 16.0% of those under age 18 and 10.2% of those age 65 or over.
