= Snyder County, Pennsylvania =

County in Pennsylvania, United States

- County
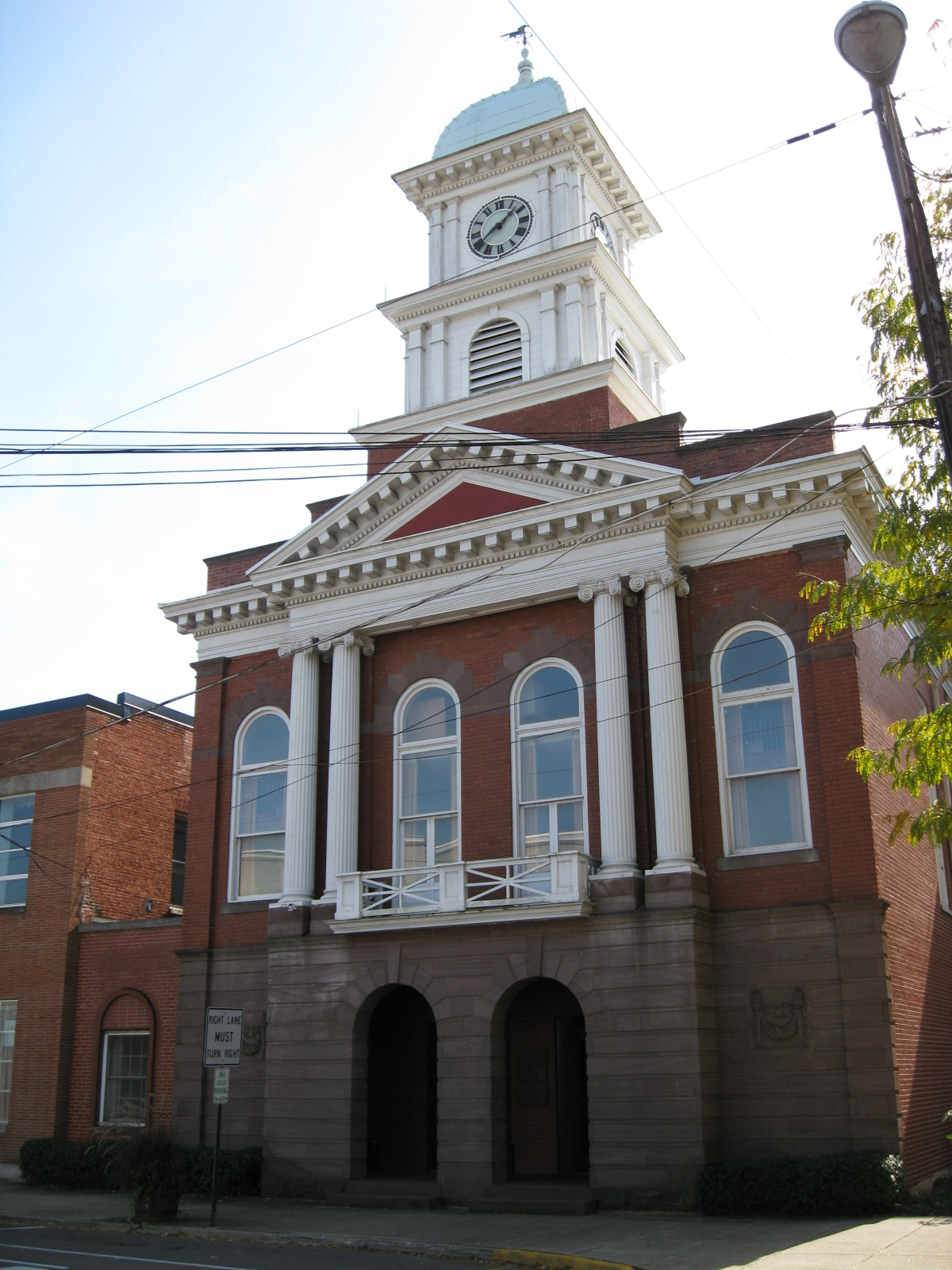
- Snyder County Courthouse

- Logo

- Location within the U.S. state of Pennsylvania
- Coordinates: 40°46′N 77°05′W
- Country: United States
- State: Pennsylvania
- Founded: March 2, 1855
- Named for: Simon Snyder
- Seat: Middleburg
- Largest borough: Selinsgrove

Area
  - Total: 332 sq mi (860 km^{2})
  - Land: 329 sq mi (850 km^{2})
  - Water: 2.8 sq mi (7.3 km^{2}) 0.8%

Population (2020)
  - Total: 39,736
  - Estimate (2025): 39,655 ▼
  - Density: 123/sq mi (47/km^{2})
- Time zone: UTC−5 (Eastern)
  - Summer (DST): UTC−4 (EDT)
- Area code: 570 & 272, 717 & 223
- Congressional district: 15th
- Website: www.snydercounty.org

Snyder County is a county in the Commonwealth of Pennsylvania. As of the 2020 census, the population was 39,736. The county seat is Middleburg. Snyder County was formed in 1855 from parts of Union County. The county is part of the Central Pennsylvania region of the state. (Note: Includes Centre, Lycoming, Northumberland, Columbia, Mifflin, Union, Snyder, Clinton, Juniata and Montour Counties)

Snyder County comprises the Selinsgrove, PA Micropolitan Statistical Area, which is also included in the Bloomsburg-Berwick-Sunbury, PA Combined Statistical Area.

== History ==
Snyder County was settled in the 1740s by Pennsylvania Germans from Berks and Lancaster counties, and became an independent political unit on March 2, 1855, when formed under part of Union County. Snyder County took its name in honor of the famous citizen and political figure Simon Snyder, who was governor of Pennsylvania for three terms, from 1808 to 1817, and made his home in Selinsgrove. The county seat of Middleburg was laid out in 1800 and incorporated in 1864.

== Geography ==
According to the U.S. Census Bureau, the county has a total area of 332 square miles (860 km^{2}), of which 329 square miles (850 km^{2}) is land and 2.8 square miles (7.3 km^{2}) (0.8%) is water. It is the fifth-smallest county in Pennsylvania by area. Snyder County is in the Ridge and Valley region of the Appalachian Mountains. Two parallel mountain ridges, Shade Mountain and Jacks Mountain, run southwest to northeast. Between the ridges are steep hills, gently rolling hills, and flat creek valleys. The Susquehanna River is the eastern border. Snyder County is one of the 423 counties served by the Appalachian Regional Commission, and it is identified as part of the "Midlands" by Colin Woodard in his book American Nations: A History of the Eleven Rival Regional Cultures of North America.

With over 400 active farms in the county, agriculture plays an important role in the economy and environment. Roughly half the county remains forested with both softwoods and hardwoods. These woods provide a place for wildlife to roam which provides for the sport of hunting.

=== Climate ===
Snyder has a humid continental climate, which is hot-summer (Dfa) except in higher elevations, where it is warm-summer (Dfb). Average temperatures in Selinsgrove range from 27.4 °F in January to 72.8 °F in July, while in Beavertown they range from 26.6 °F in January to 72.1 °F in July.

=== Adjacent counties ===
- Union County (north)
- Northumberland County (east)
- Juniata County (south)
- Mifflin County (west)

== Demographics ==
Historical population
Census	Pop.	Note	%±
1860	15,035		—
1870	15,606		3.8%
1880	17,797		14.0%
1890	17,651		−0.8%
1900	17,304		−2.0%
1910	16,800		−2.9%
1920	17,129		2.0%
1930	18,836		10.0%
1940	20,208		7.3%
1950	22,912		13.4%
1960	25,922		13.1%
1970	29,269		12.9%
1980	33,584		14.7%
1990	36,680		9.2%
2000	37,546		2.4%
2010	39,702		5.7%
2020	39,736		0.1%
2025 (est.)	39,655	▼	−0.2%
U.S. Decennial Census; 1790–1960 1900–1990; 1990–2000 2010–2017 2010-2020

=== Racial and ethnic composition ===
Snyder County, Pennsylvania – Racial and ethnic composition Note: the US Census treats Hispanic/Latino as an ethnic category. This table excludes Latinos from the racial categories and assigns them to a separate category. Hispanics/Latinos may be of any race.
Race / Ethnicity (NH = Non-Hispanic)	Pop 1980	Pop 1990	Pop 2000	Pop 2010	Pop 2020	% 1980	% 1990	% 2000	% 2010	% 2020
White alone (NH)	33,215	36,260	36,559	38,127	36,992	98.90%	98.85%	97.37%	96.03%	93.09%
Black or African American alone (NH)	145	143	288	375	504	0.43%	0.39%	0.77%	0.94%	1.27%
Native American or Alaska Native alone (NH)	25	30	15	43	32	0.07%	0.08%	0.04%	0.11%	0.08%
Asian alone (NH)	51	93	153	211	296	0.15%	0.25%	0.41%	0.53%	0.74%
Native Hawaiian or Pacific Islander alone (NH)	x	x	2	5	11	x	x	0.01%	0.01%	0.03%
Other race alone (NH)	33	6	7	12	58	0.10%	0.02%	0.02%	0.03%	0.15%
Mixed race or Multiracial (NH)	x	x	154	272	866	x	x	0.41%	0.69%	2.18%
Hispanic or Latino (any race)	115	148	368	657	977	0.34%	0.40%	0.98%	1.65%	2.46%
Total	33,584	36,680	37,546	39,702	39,736	100.00%	100.00%	100.00%	100.00%	100.00%

=== 2020 census ===
As of the 2020 census, the county had a population of 39,736. The median age was 40.3 years. 21.6% of residents were under the age of 18 and 19.4% of residents were 65 years of age or older. For every 100 females there were 97.2 males, and for every 100 females age 18 and over there were 94.7 males age 18 and over.

29.7% of residents lived in urban areas, while 70.3% lived in rural areas.

There were 14,753 households in the county, of which 28.9% had children under the age of 18 living in them. Of all households, 55.6% were married-couple households, 15.8% were households with a male householder and no spouse or partner present, and 21.8% were households with a female householder and no spouse or partner present. About 25.7% of all households were made up of individuals and 13.6% had someone living alone who was 65 years of age or older.

There were 15,978 housing units, of which 7.7% were vacant. Among occupied housing units, 73.9% were owner-occupied and 26.1% were renter-occupied. The homeowner vacancy rate was 0.9% and the rental vacancy rate was 5.4%.

The racial makeup of the county was 93.9% White, 1.4% Black or African American, 0.1% American Indian and Alaska Native, 0.8% Asian, <0.1% Native Hawaiian and Pacific Islander, 0.8% from some other race, and 3.0% from two or more races. Hispanic or Latino residents of any race comprised 2.5% of the population.

=== 2010 census ===
As of the 2010 census, there were 39,702 people, 14,414 households, and 9,981 families residing in the county. The population density was 113 people per square mile (44 people/km^{2}). There were 14,890 housing units at an average density of 45 units per square mile (17/km^{2}). The racial makeup of the county was 97% White, 1.2% Black or African American, 0.1% Native American, 0.42% Asian, and 0.07% Pacific Islander. Two percent of the population were Hispanic or Latino. US Veterans – 2,681. Median household income (in 2014 dollars), 2010–2014 was reported as $48,718, while the per capita income was $23,886. In 2014, the median household income in the USA was $53,700.

=== 2000 census ===
As of the 2000 census, there were 37,546 people, 13,654 households, and 9,981 families residing in the county. The population density was 113 people per square mile (44 people/km^{2}). There were 14,890 housing units at an average density of 45 units per square mile (17/km^{2}). The racial makeup of the county was 97.93% White, 0.82% Black or African American, 0.05% Native American, 0.42% Asian, 0.01% Pacific Islander. 0.98% of the population were Hispanic or Latino of any race. 48.2% were of German, 17.2% American and 5.5% English ancestry.

There were 13,654 households, out of which 32.10% had children under the age of 18 living with them, 62.00% were married couples living together, 7.40% had a female householder with no husband present, and 26.90% were non-families. 22.40% of all households were made up of individuals, and 10.30% had someone living alone who was 65 years of age or older. The average household size was 2.58 and the average family size was 3.02.

In the county, the population was spread out, with 24.00% under the age of 18, 11.20% from 18 to 24, 27.40% from 25 to 44, 23.30% from 45 to 64, and 14.00% who were 65 years of age or older. The median age was 37 years. For every 100 females there were 95.60 males. For every 100 females age 18 and over, there were 93.10 males.

== Micropolitan statistical area ==
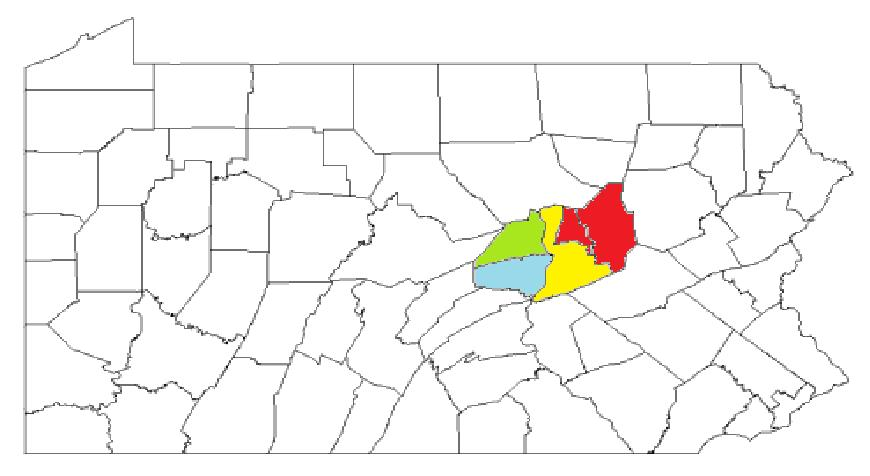
Map of the Bloomsburg–Berwick–Sunbury, PA Combined Statistical Area (CSA), composed of the following parts: Bloomsburg–Berwick, PA Metropolitan Statistical Area (MSA) Sunbury, PA Micropolitan Statistical Area (μSA) Lewisburg, PA Micropolitan Statistical Area (μSA) Selinsgrove, PA Micropolitan Statistical Area (μSA)

The United States Office of Management and Budget has designated Snyder County as the Selinsgrove, PA micropolitan statistical area (μSA). As of the 2010 census the micropolitan area ranked 15th most populous in the State of Pennsylvania and the 313th most populous in the United States with a population of 39,702. Snyder County is also a part of the Bloomsburg–Berwick–Sunbury, PA combined statistical area (CSA), which combines the populations of Snyder County, as well as Columbia, Montour, Northumberland and Union Counties in Pennsylvania. The combined statistical area ranked 8th in Pennsylvania and 115th most populous in the United States with a population of 264,739.

== Politics ==
United States presidential election results for Snyder County, Pennsylvania
Year	Republican		Democratic		Third party(ies)	
Year	No.	%	No.	%	No.	%
1888	2,360	60.36%	1,493	38.18%	57	1.46%
1892	2,307	59.92%	1,511	39.25%	32	0.83%
1896	2,572	64.66%	1,351	33.96%	55	1.38%
1900	2,517	64.85%	1,319	33.99%	45	1.16%
1904	2,538	71.55%	972	27.40%	37	1.04%
1908	2,401	67.41%	1,081	30.35%	80	2.25%
1912	626	18.80%	991	29.76%	1,713	51.44%
1916	1,797	57.74%	1,247	40.07%	68	2.19%
1920	2,751	72.20%	964	25.30%	95	2.49%
1924	3,055	72.00%	970	22.86%	218	5.14%
1928	5,693	87.22%	805	12.33%	29	0.44%
1932	3,423	59.37%	2,176	37.74%	167	2.90%
1936	5,550	64.55%	2,999	34.88%	49	0.57%
1940	5,722	69.66%	2,478	30.17%	14	0.17%
1944	5,696	75.81%	1,795	23.89%	23	0.31%
1948	5,181	77.66%	1,490	22.34%	0	0.00%
1952	6,836	80.00%	1,686	19.73%	23	0.27%
1956	7,102	78.35%	1,959	21.61%	3	0.03%
1960	8,103	80.09%	1,998	19.75%	16	0.16%
1964	5,195	55.17%	4,199	44.59%	22	0.23%
1968	6,784	71.64%	1,993	21.05%	692	7.31%
1972	7,308	78.20%	1,834	19.63%	203	2.17%
1976	6,557	66.04%	3,097	31.19%	275	2.77%
1980	7,634	72.08%	2,418	22.83%	539	5.09%
1984	8,968	78.73%	2,383	20.92%	40	0.35%
1988	9,054	76.87%	2,658	22.57%	67	0.57%
1992	6,934	55.05%	2,952	23.44%	2,710	21.51%
1996	6,742	57.91%	3,405	29.25%	1,495	12.84%
2000	8,963	69.80%	3,536	27.54%	342	2.66%
2004	10,566	70.52%	4,348	29.02%	69	0.46%
2008	9,900	63.60%	5,382	34.58%	284	1.82%
2012	10,073	66.85%	4,687	31.11%	308	2.04%
2016	11,725	71.12%	4,002	24.28%	759	4.60%
2020	13,983	72.90%	4,910	25.60%	288	1.50%
2024	14,664	73.02%	5,239	26.09%	178	0.89%

United States Senate election results for Snyder County, Pennsylvania1
Year	Republican		Democratic		Third party(ies)	
Year	No.	%	No.	%	No.	%
1994	6,225	65.18%	2,843	29.77%	483	5.06%
2000	9,217	73.67%	2,909	23.25%	385	3.08%
2006	7,147	63.34%	4,137	36.66%	0	0.00%
2012	9,851	66.26%	4,651	31.28%	366	2.46%
2018	8,826	65.90%	4,322	32.27%	245	1.83%
2024	14,211	71.24%	5,309	26.62%	427	2.14%

United States Senate election results for Snyder County, Pennsylvania3
Year	Republican		Democratic		Third party(ies)	
Year	No.	%	No.	%	No.	%
1992	7,248	58.35%	4,101	33.01%	1,073	8.64%
1998	5,963	75.29%	1,708	21.57%	249	3.14%
2004	10,017	68.63%	3,361	23.03%	1,217	8.34%
2010	8,072	71.94%	3,148	28.06%	0	0.00%
2016	10,867	66.74%	4,299	26.40%	1,116	6.85%
2022	10,657	69.49%	4,220	27.52%	459	2.99%

Pennsylvania Gubernatorial election results for Snyder County
Year	Republican		Democratic		Third party(ies)	
Year	No.	%	No.	%	No.	%
1970	5,112	63.28%	2,564	31.74%	403	4.99%
1974	5,053	64.05%	2,739	34.72%	97	1.23%
1978	6,324	75.30%	2,039	24.28%	35	0.42%
1982	5,675	61.81%	3,483	37.93%	24	0.26%
1986	6,000	64.87%	3,150	34.06%	99	1.07%
1990	2,697	36.09%	4,777	63.91%	0	0.00%
1994	6,007	62.80%	2,332	24.38%	1,227	12.83%
1998	5,565	69.95%	1,405	17.66%	986	12.39%
2002	6,623	70.32%	2,599	27.59%	197	2.09%
2006	7,203	63.88%	4,073	36.12%	0	0.00%
2010	8,591	76.01%	2,712	23.99%	0	0.00%
2014	5,772	59.18%	3,982	40.82%	0	0.00%
2018	8,283	62.13%	4,833	36.25%	216	1.62%
2022	10,215	66.50%	4,867	31.69%	278	1.81%

The county is strongly Republican in presidential elections. The last Republican nominee to receive less than 60% of the county’s vote was Bob Dole. In 2008 John McCain received 64% of the county’s vote. In the 1964 presidential election Snyder County was one of only four counties in Pennsylvania to vote for Barry Goldwater, and by 0.6 percentage points shaded Carroll County, New Hampshire as Goldwater’s strongest county in the Northeast. The last Republican presidential candidate to lose Snyder County was incumbent president William Howard Taft when he split the Republican vote with challenger and former president Theodore Roosevelt, who took the county for the insurgent Progressive Party. In fact, no Democratic presidential candidate has been able to claim the county since Pennsylvania native James Buchanan won the presidency in 1856. The only county in Pennsylvania to be more steadfastly Republican (or indeed, remain so one-sidedly partisan for either party in Pennsylvania) in presidential contests has been Snyder County's neighbor to the north, Union County, which voted for John C. Fremont over Buchanan in 1856. Snyder was the most Republican county in Pennsylvania at the presidential level from 1956 to 1996.

The county is located in Pennsylvania's 12th congressional district, which has a Cook Partisan Voting Index of R+17 and is represented by Republican Fred Keller. As part of Pennsylvania Senate, District 27 it is represented by Republican Lynda Schlegel Culver. The county contains locations in Pennsylvania House of Representatives, District 82, Pennsylvania House of Representatives, District 85, and Pennsylvania House of Representatives, District 108. All of these have been represented by Republicans since 1989.

Of "Straight Party" voters in Snyder 73.2% are Republican and 24.65% are Democratic. In the 2008 election Republicans won in all races and in most they won by over 20%. Chris Carney lost by roughly 13% in the county while winning by 12% in the district.

=== State representatives ===
Serve two-year terms in Pennsylvania House of Representatives

- David H. Rowe, Republican, 85th district
- Lynda Schlegel-Culver Republican, 108th district

=== State senator ===
- John Gordner, Republican, 27th district serves four-year term in Pennsylvania Senate.

=== U.S. representatives ===
- Glenn Thompson, Republican, Pennsylvania's 15th congressional district

=== U.S. senators ===
Snyder County is further represented by two U.S. senators, which as of 2025, are split between the Republican Party and the Democratic Party.

- John Fetterman, serving since 2023, current term expires in 2029
- Dave McCormick, serving since 2025, current term expires in 2031

== Boards and agencies ==
- Snyder County Conservation District The conservation district is governed by a seven-member board of volunteer directors. They offer programs regarding nutrient management, erosion prevention, Improving Dirt & Gravel Roads, and Watershed Protection.
- Snyder County Cooperative Extension Board Snyder County Courthouse, Middleburg, PA. Through educational programs, publications, and events, cooperative extension agents deliver unbiased, research-based information to Snyder County citizens.
- Snyder County Housing Authority's mission is to promote safe, sanitary, and affordable housing, and maintain a good quality of life for Snyder County residents. Provides rental assistance to low income county residents using a voucher system for renting suitable housing. The authority meets on the third Wednesday of each month in the conference room of its Administrative offices located at 106 Drake Court in Middleburg.
- Snyder County Emergency Services is the public-safety answering point (PSAP) for Snyder County. The office is located at 30 Universal Rd, Selinsgrove, PA 17870.
- Columbia, Montour, Snyder and Union Joinder Board and Local Emergency Planning Committee
- Snyder County Agricultural Land Preservation Board
- Tourism Fund Review Panel for Snyder County
- SEDA-Council of Governments Board of Directors
- Central Pennsylvania Workforce Development Corp. board
- Snyder County Prison Board
- Snyder County Waste Management Authority 713 Bridge Street, Suite 9, Selinsgrove, Pa 17870 The Authority is charged with the planning of how to manage the solid waste in the county. A 8909 recycling program is available throughout the county with a varying schedule. Additionally, it is examining the issue of a single waste hauler contract for the county or to continue to allow individuals to contract privately with individual haulers.
- Snyder County Amateur Radio Emergency Communications provide vital communication resources during a crisis or disaster. Efforts go through the county's Emergency Management Coordinator.

== Utilities ==
Electric – All 21 municipalities within Snyder County receive electric service from PPL Electric Utilities, Inc. According to the U.S. Department of Energy, a 500 kilovolt line runs through Snyder County. Three 138 kilovolt lines stem from this 500 kilovolt line at the Sunbury Generation coal-fired power plant in Shamokin Dam, which is capable of producing roughly 400 megawatts of electrical power.

Water – Water service in Snyder County is provided by various municipal and regional authorities, private water providers, and private well water sources.

Gas – UGI Penn Natural Gas is the only natural gas provider in Snyder County, providing service to Jackson, Middlecreek, Monroe, and Penn Townships, as well as Selinsgrove and Shamokin Dam Boroughs. Several propane dealers exist to service the rural community.

Communications – Verizon provides telephone service and EvenLink provides VoIP telephone service to all 21 municipalities in Snyder County.

Cable television service is provided by Service Electric Cablevision, Nittany Media, Inc., and Beaver Springs Community TV Association.

High-speed Internet access is principally provided by Verizon, EvenLink, and Service Electric Cablevision.

== Economy ==
Manufacturing since the year 2001 was faced with the largest loss in employment in Snyder County. The sector dealt with a loss of 427 jobs, or 7.2 percent of the employment in the industry. This made up a total of 36 percent of all county employment losses since 2001. Employment Report for Snyder County, Pennsylvania. U.S. Department of Labor. Bureau of Labor Statistics.

== Education ==
=== Colleges and universities ===
- Susquehanna University

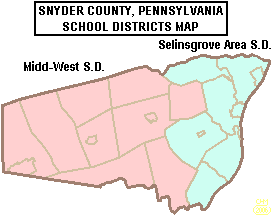
Map of Snyder County, Pennsylvania Public School Districts

=== Public school districts ===
- Midd-West School District
- Selinsgrove Area School District

=== Private schools ===
As reported by the National Center for Educational Statistics

- Bannerville School, Mcclure, Grades 2-8
- Chapman Parochial School, Port Trevorton, Grades 1-9
- Gospel Christian Academy, Selinsgrove, Grades KG-11
- Jacks Mountain School, Mcclure, Grades 1-8
- Kantz Church School, Middleburg, Grades 1-8
- Lakeview School, Port Trevorton, Grades 1-8
- Leaning Oak School, Mount Pleasant Mills, Grades 1-9
- Locust Grove School, Mount Pleasant Mills, Grades 1-8
- Meadow View School, Trevorton, Grades 1-8
- New Story School, Special education K-12, Selinsgrove Operates in the former Jackson-Penn Elementary School building on lease from SASD
- Palace Creek School, Mount Pleasant Mills, Grades 1-8
- Penn View Christian Academy, Penns Creek, Grades PK-12
- Shady Grove Parochial School, Port Trevorton, Grades 1-8
- White Oak School Liverpool, Grades 1-8

== Transportation ==
Snyder County has two main arteries. U.S. Routes 11/15 travel through the county on the east end generally following the path of the Susquehanna River. The proposed Central Susquehanna Valley Thruway travels through the county. U.S. Route 522 begins in Selinsgrove and travels west through Kreamer, Middleburg and on to Lewistown. Route 35 begins on U.S. 11/15 south of Selinsgrove and runs roughly parallel to Route 522, crossing through Freeburg and Mount Pleasant Mills then westward to McAllisterville and Richfield in western Snyder County. State routes 235, 104 and 204 cross the county in a north–south direction.

== Communities ==
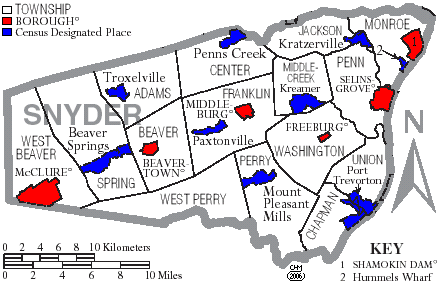
Map of Snyder County with municipal labels showing boroughs (red), townships (white), and census-designated places (blue)

Under Pennsylvania law, there are four types of incorporated municipalities: cities, boroughs, townships, and, in at most two cases, towns. The following boroughs and townships are located in Snyder County:

=== Boroughs ===
- Beavertown
- Freeburg
- McClure
- Middleburg (county seat)
- Selinsgrove
- Shamokin Dam

=== Townships ===
- Adams
- Beaver
- Center
- Chapman
- Franklin
- Jackson
- Middlecreek
- Monroe
- Penn
- Perry
- Spring
- Union
- Washington
- West Beaver
- West Perry

=== Census-designated places ===
Census-designated places are geographical areas designated by the U.S. Census Bureau for the purposes of compiling demographic data. They are not actual jurisdictions under Pennsylvania law. Other unincorporated communities, such as villages, may be listed here as well.

- Beaver Springs
- Hummels Wharf
- Kissimmee (not a CDP)
- Kratzerville
- Kreamer
- Mount Pleasant Mills
- Paxtonville
- Penns Creek
- Port Trevorton
- Richfield (partly in Juniata County)
- Troxelville

=== Population ranking ===
The population ranking of the following table is based on the 2010 census of Snyder County.

† county seat

Rank	City/Town/etc.	Municipal type	Population (2010 Census)
1	Selinsgrove	Borough	5,654
2	Shamokin Dam	Borough	1,686
3	Hummels Wharf	CDP	1,353
4	† Middleburg	Borough	1,309
5	Beavertown	Borough	965
6	McClure	Borough	941
7	Kreamer	CDP	822
8	Port Trevorton	CDP	769
9	Penns Creek	CDP	715
10	Beaver Springs	CDP	674
11	Freeburg	Borough	575
12	Richfield (partially in Juniata County)	CDP	549
13	Mount Pleasant Mills	CDP	464
14	Kratzerville	CDP	383
15	Paxtonville	CDP	265
16	Troxelville	CDP	221

== Culture ==
Snyder County is well known for its unmistakable Pennsylvania German language and culture, agricultural heritage, as well as its fraktur, Kentucky rifles, wood products industries, Middleswarth chip factory, and the annual fairs, festivals, and auctions that keep the local heritage alive. Some of the more famous historical structures of the county are the Governor Snyder Mansion, Pomfret's Castle, Schoch Block House, ruins of the Pennsylvania Canal, and its covered bridges. Snyder County is home to Snyder-Middleswarth State Park, the Tall Timbers Natural Area, and thirteen Pennsylvania state historical markers.

=== Historical markers ===
- Pennsylvania Canal (Susquehanna Division) – US 11 & 15 at Port Trevorton
- Simon Snyder – SR 2017 (old US 11 & 15) just S of Selinsgrove
- Simon Snyder Mansion (Plaque) – 121 N. Market St. (old US 11 & 15), Selinsgrove
- Coxey’s Army – 814 N. Market St. (old US 11 & 15), Selinsgrove
- Penns Creek Massacre – SR 2017 (old US 11 & 15) just N of Selinsgrove
- Penns Creek Massacre (Plaque) – S end Old Trail (just E of US 11 & 15), Penns Creek N of Selinsgrove
- Schoch Blockhouse – US 522 at Kreamer
- Susquehanna University – US 522, .5 mile W of old US 11 & 15, Selinsgrove
- Albany Purchase – US 522 (old US 11 & 15) 1 mile N of Selinsgrove
- Harris Ambush (Plaque) – At the Old Bridge, 1/2 mile W of Selinsgrove
- Sunbury – U.S. 11 & 15, 4 miles N of Selinsgrove
- Shikellamy – US 11, 5.4 miles N of Selinsgrove entrance to Shikellamy State Park
- Snyder County – County courthouse, 9 W. Market St. (US 522), Middleburg

== See also ==
- National Register of Historic Places listings in Snyder County, Pennsylvania
