= Penn Township, Snyder County, Pennsylvania =

Township in Pennsylvania, United States

- Township
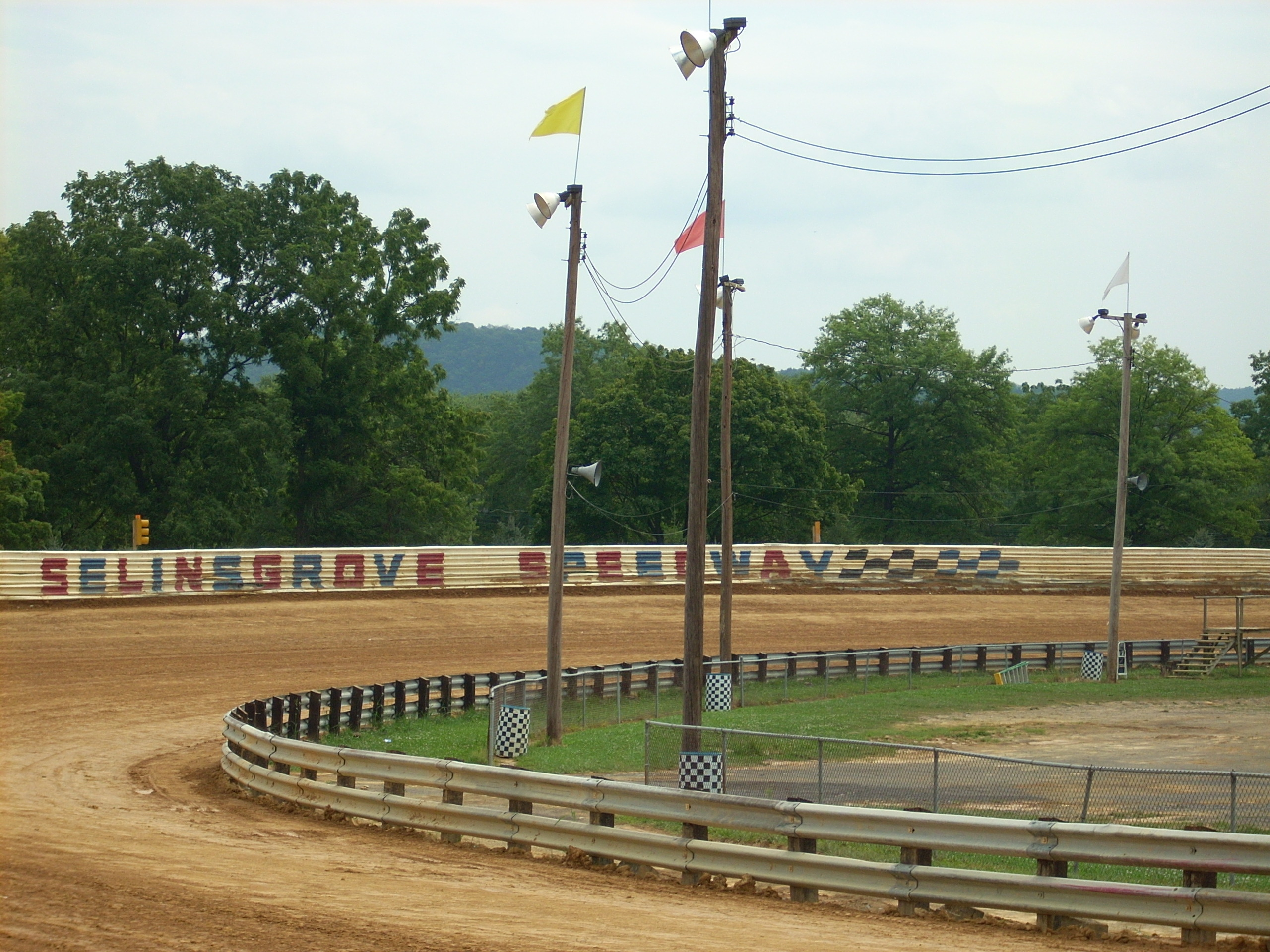
- Selinsgrove Speedway is in Penn Township

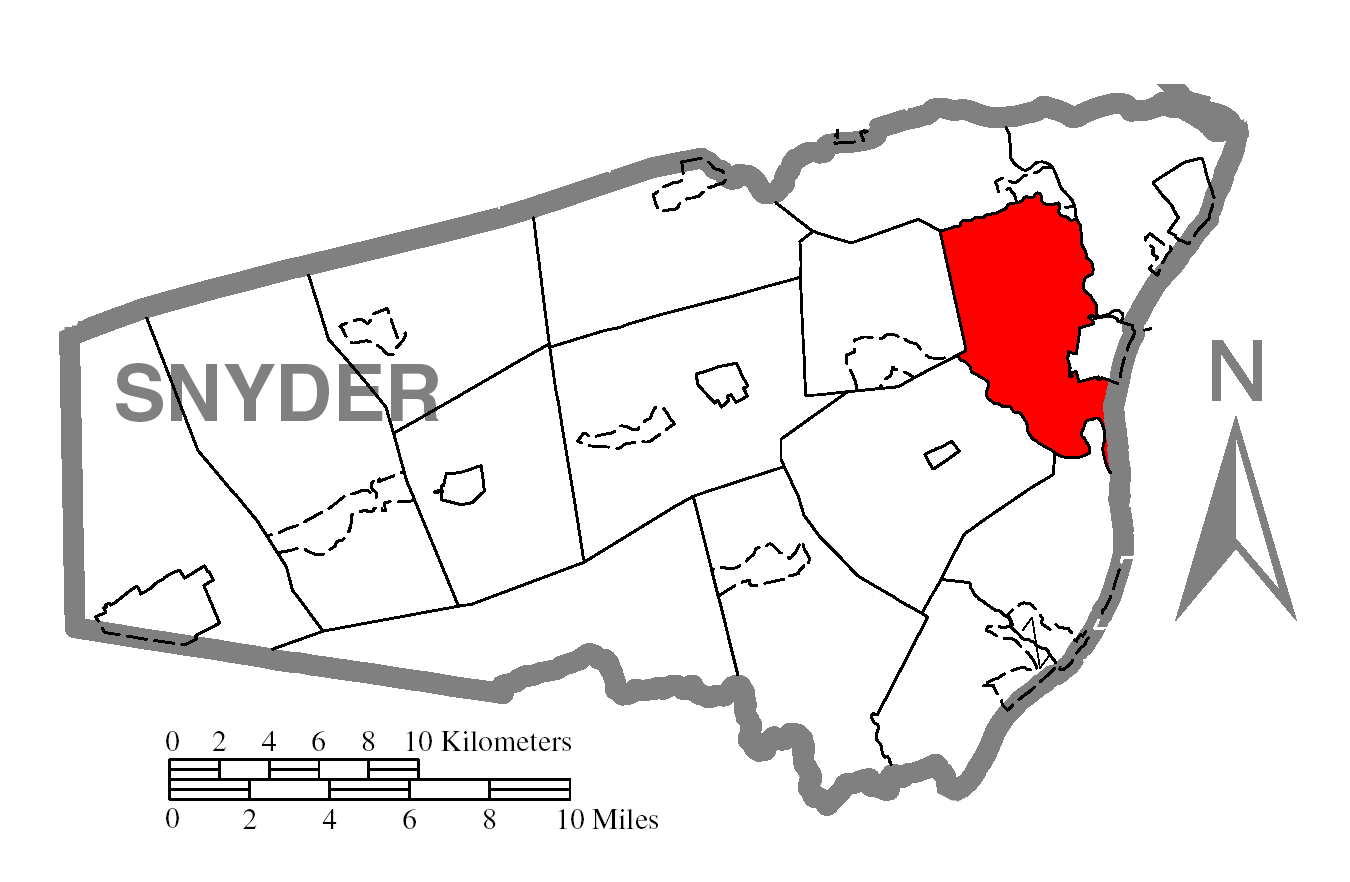
- Map of Snyder County, Pennsylvania highlighting Penn Township

- Map of Snyder County, Pennsylvania
- Coordinates: 40°50′00″N 76°54′59″W
- Country: United States
- State: Pennsylvania
- County: Snyder
- Settled: 1745
- Incorporated: 1758

Government
  - Type: Board of Supervisors

Area
  - Total: 17.85 sq mi (46.22 km^{2})
  - Land: 17.60 sq mi (45.58 km^{2})
  - Water: 0.25 sq mi (0.64 km^{2})

Population (2020)
  - Total: 4,048 ▼
  - Estimate (2022): 4,060
  - Density: 247.7/sq mi (95.64/km^{2})
- Time zone: UTC−5 (Eastern (EST))
  - Summer (DST): UTC−4 (EDT)
- ZIP Code: 17870
- Area code: 570
- FIPS code: 42-109-58864

Penn Township is a township in Snyder County, Pennsylvania, United States. The population was 4,048 at the 2020 census.

Penn Township is home to the Selinsgrove Speedway, a halfmile high-banked oval dirt track.

== History ==
The Bridge between Monroe and Penn Townships was added to the National Register of Historic Places in 1988.

== Geography ==
According to the United States Census Bureau, the township has a total area of 18.1 square miles (46.8 km^{2}), of which 17.9 square miles (46.3 km^{2}) is land and 0.2 square mile (0.5 km^{2}) (1.00%) is water.

Penn Township is crossed by Penns Creek. This creek originates from a spring in Penn's Cave in Centre County that eventually drains into the Susquehanna River. Penns Creek is highly prone to flooding with moderate to heavy rainfall. The upper waters are famous for flyfishing in the spring.

== Demographics ==
Historical population
Census	Pop.	Note	%±
2010	4,324		—
2020	4,048		−6.4%
2022 (est.)	4,060		0.3%
U.S. Decennial Census

As of the census of 2010, there were 4,324 people, 1,582 households, and 1076 families residing in the township. The population density was 211.4 inhabitants per square mile (81.6/km^{2}). There were 1668 housing units at an average density of 71.0 per square mile (27.4/km^{2}). The racial makeup of the township was 95.48% White, 2.59% African American, 0.05% Native American, 0.79% Asian, 0.66% from other races, and 0.42% from two or more races. Hispanic or Latino of any race were 2.17% of the population.

There were 1582 households, out of which 35.0% had children under the age of 18 living with them, 65.3% were married couples living together, 7.5% had a female householder with no husband present, and 22.7% were non-families. 17.0% of all households were made up of individuals, and 5.9% had someone living alone who was 65 years of age or older. The average household size was 2.65 and the average family size was 3.00.

In the township the population was spread out, with 21.0% under the age of 18, 6.6% from 18 to 24, 31.0% from 25 to 44, 30.0% from 45 to 64, and 11.4% who were 65 years of age or older. The median age was 40 years. For every 100 females there were 110.9 males. For every 100 females age 18 and over, there were 115.4 males.

The median income for a household in the township was $44,630, and the median income for a family was $50,390. Males had a median income of $33,203 versus $22,111 for females. The per capita income for the township was $18,851. About 6.7% of families and 6.9% of the population were below the poverty line, including 10.5% of those under age 18 and 5.8% of those age 65 or over.

== Economics ==
Efforts of local business leaders to promote development were rewarded in 2005, with a $2.4 million grant and low-interest loan package to develop Pawling Station Business Park. It is a 48-acre (190,000 m^{2}) site along Route 522 in Penn Township, that will feature three to 6-acre (24,000 m^{2}) lots with storm water drainage. An 18-member volunteer task force will oversee the construction of Pawling Park.

Major employers in the region include a significant number of housing related manufacturers, state facilities, as well as local government entities like the school district. With the decline in housing manufacturing in 2007 several local factories have closed displacing about 250 workers.
