= William S. Stokley =

American politician (1823–1902)

William Strumberg Stokley
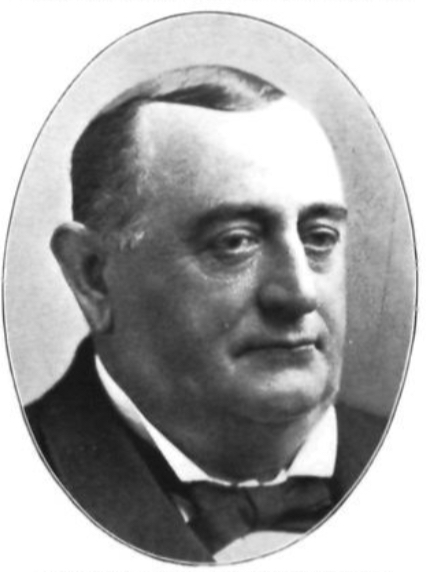

72nd Mayor of Philadelphia, Pennsylvania
- In office January 1, 1872 – April 4, 1881
- Preceded by: Daniel M. Fox
- Succeeded by: Samuel G. King

President of the Philadelphia Select Council
- In office 1868–1872

Member of the Philadelphia Select Council
- In office 1868–1872

President of the Philadelphia Common Council
- In office 1865–1868

Member of the Philadelphia Common Council from the 9th ward
- In office 1860–1868

Personal details
- Born: April 25, 1823; Philadelphia, Pennsylvania, U.S.
- Died: February 21, 1902 (aged 78)
- Resting place: Laurel Hill Cemetery, Philadelphia, Pennsylvania, U.S.
- Political party: Republican

William Strumberg Stokley (April 25, 1823 – February 21, 1902) was an American politician who served on the Philadelphia City Council (both in its upper and lower chambers) and as the 72nd Mayor of Philadelphia from 1872 to 1881.

== Biography ==
Stokley was born on April 25, 1823, in Philadelphia. His father died when he was young, leaving him and his mother to care for his younger brother and sister.

== Early career ==
Stokley built a confectionery business and joined the Franklin Hose Company, a volunteer fire company. As the treasurer and representative to the city's Fire Association, he became exposed to the politics of Philadelphia.

== Philadelphia City Council (1860–1872) ==
In 1860, he won a seat on the Common Council) the lower chamber of the Philadelphia City Council) representing the Ninth Ward. In 1865, he became the president of the Common Council. During his time as a city councilor, Stokley was not a major player in the city's Republican Party, which was dominated at the time by William B. Mann (the district attorney of Philadelphia).

In 1867, he won a seat on the Select Council (the upper chamber of the city council) and became its president in 1868. On the council, he passed reforms that abolished volunteer fire companies and established a professional city fire department. He also passed an ordinance to shift control of the Philadelphia Gas Works to a city department from the local “gas trust”. However,

=== Philadelphia City Hall ===
As the president of the Select Council, Stokey became involved in the construction of a new city hall. At the time, there was a considerable dispute as to whether the new building should be constructed at Penn Square, which was in Stokley’s ward or in Washington Square near Independence Hall, which was closer to the commercial center of Philadelphia. In addition, the construction of the building would generate significant government expenditures, which many local businessmen sought to share in. As president of the Select Council, Stokley also held an ex officio seat on the city's Public Buildings Commission, which was overseeing the matter. Stokley attempted to influence the Public Buildings Commission to select Penn Square. After struggling, he recruited help from Alexander Wilson Henszey (an ally in the Pennsylvania State Senate).

Around the start of 1869, 8th ward common councilman John Rice guided the Common Council to pass a resolution to hold a public vote on the question of a city hall location. The Select Council voted down this bill, and also passed a resolution asking the state legislature to not intervene in the matter. However, in March 1869 Henszey guided to a bills to State Senate passage to hold a public vote on the question of city hall location in the next regular election, and another bill banning public buildings from being constructed in Independence Square. The bill to hold a vote was soon after signed into law by Governor John Geary, by the bill banning construction of public buildings at Independence Square was vetoed by the governor who argued it included an unnecessary prohibition. With knowledge of the governor's intent to veto Independence Square prohibition, even before it was vetoed Henszey had begun guiding to state senate passage a new bill to render Independence Square "a public green forever", which would have the effect of preventing construction on it. The bill was amended by other senators prior to its passage to protect from demolition some buildings at Penn Square and to also order that other new public buildings (housing the Pennsylvania Academy of Fine Arts, Franklin Institute, Library Company of Philadelphia, and Academy of Natural Sciences) would be located at Penn Square if it was rejected by voters as a location for the city hall. Before its passage, the bill also was amended to contain a provision to restructure the Public Buildings Commission by removing the seats held by several contractors, and by also making votes of the commission binding, removing the City Council's power to supervise city hall construction. Retaining his ex-officio seat on the commission, Stokley now had political control of the newly-truncated membership of the commission. In October 1869, Philadelphia voters were presented with referendum on whether they supported Penn Square and Washington Square as the site of the new city hall. Penn Square passed with an 18,000-vote margin-of-victory, a vote result which was similar to the margins that Republican nominees led by in elections for local offices.

By early 1871, Stokley was seen as his party's probable nominee in that year's mayoral nomination (with the nomination expected to be determined at a June nominating convention). He aligned himself with business community objections to a number of controversial decisions that the Committee on Public Buildings had made. By appearing against these proposals, he benefited his prospects of being elected mayor by distancing himself from controversial actions of the committee in the months the Republican nominating convention and the general election.

== Mayor of Philadelphia (1872–1881) ==
In 1871, he ran for mayor and defeated James S. Biddle.

The contracts for the construction of City Hall had run over $24 million, more than double the original $10 million estimate. On one of the latest contracts, $5.3 million was handed out with no bidding for the marble used in construction. The construction company would purchase the marble from a quarry owned by allies of Stokley. The mayor reportedly acquired a new brownstone home, courtesy of the building contractors.

Stokley was reelected to two more terms as mayor, defeating Alexander McClure in 1874 and Joseph L. Caven in 1877. In 1881, some Republicans, including Rudolph Blankenburg, who wanted to see a change from what they viewed as a corrupt administration, pushed the city's Committee of One Hundred to withdraw its endorsement of Stokley in favor of Democrat Samuel G. King who defeated Stokley in that election.

== Death ==
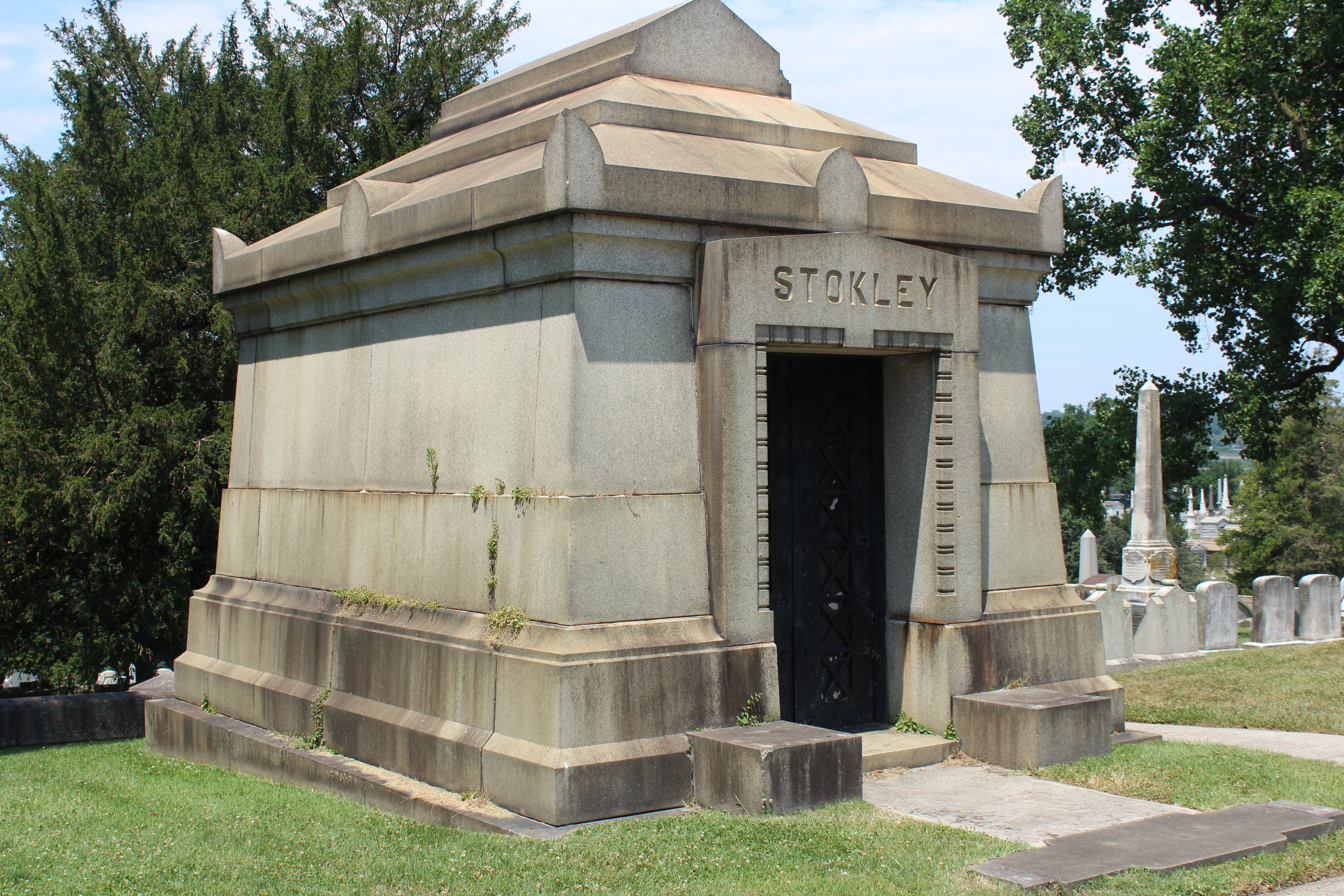
William S. Stokely Mausoleum in Laurel Hill Cemetery

Stokley died on February 21, 1902, and was interred at Laurel Hill Cemetery in Philadelphia.

== See also ==
- List of mayors of Philadelphia

Political offices
Preceded by Daniel M. Fox	Mayor of Philadelphia; 1872–1881	Succeeded by Samuel G. King
