= 1887 Philadelphia mayoral election =

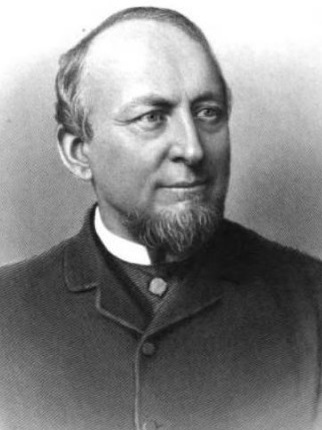

Nominee	Edwin Henry Fitler	George deBenneville Keim
Party	Republican	Democratic
Popular vote	90,211	62,263
Percentage	59.17%	40.84%
Mayor before election
William Burns Smith
Republican
Elected mayor
Edwin Henry Fitler
Republican

The 1887 Philadelphia mayoral election saw the election of Edwin Henry Fitler. This was the first Philadelphia mayoral election to a 4-year term. Previously, since 1862, mayoral elections had been for three-year terms.

== Results ==
1887 Philadelphia mayoral election
Party	Candidate	Votes	%
Republican	Edwin Henry Fitler	90,211	59.17%
Democratic	George deBenneville Keim	62,263	40.84%
Turnout		152,474	
