= Salt River (politics) =

19th century American metaphor for political defeat

'To Go Up Salt River'
- Meaning: losing an election or political defeat
- Origin: Antebellum South era of the United States
- First used in: 1827
- First popularised in: 1839
- First popularised by: Alexander Duncan

The phrase ‘to go up Salt River’ or ‘to be rowed up Salt River’ is a colloquial political slogan or catchphrase originating from the Antebellum South era of the United States, with its earliest references from 1827 onwards. It was often used in political cartoons and speeches as a metaphor to symbolise political defeat, or even specifically synonymous with ‘losing an election.’ It was later popularised in political expression by Ohio Representative Alexander Duncan when using it in a speech in the House of Representatives in 1839.

Geographically, the Salt River is a 150-mile-long river running through the state of Kentucky, running from near Parksville and emptying out into the Ohio River near West Point. Before the use of railroads, the Ohio River was the main waterway of travel, with boats carrying hundreds of passengers every day. As an implication, to go up Salt River was to leave the main, conventional way of travel, leaving people with the potential to "end up in the middle of nowhere on a dead-end stream." This reflects the metaphor of political defeat which it symbolises.

== Origin ==
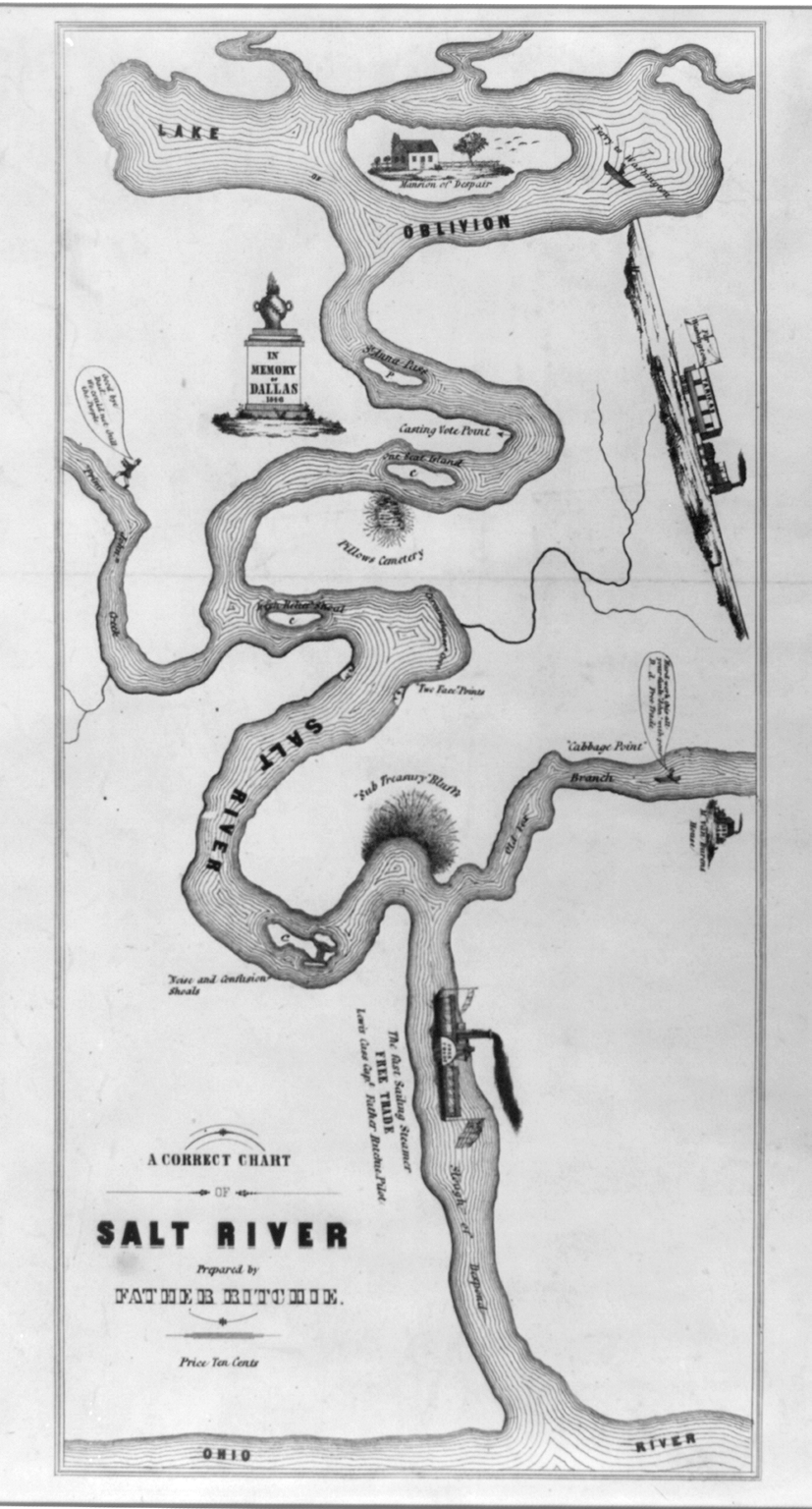
A 'correct' chart of Salt River, where its geographical location is used as a tool for political caricature; "Mansion of Despair," "Slough of Despond," "Lake Oblivion."

There is debate as to when the catchphrase became politicised in its use. In Richard H. Thornton’s An American Glossary, it gives the definition as "To row a man up Salt River is to beat him or make him otherwise uncomfortable. The phrase is much used with reference to a defeated party in politics."

Most sources take the origin of the phrase to be from an anecdote referenced in the Dictionary of American History. The anecdote goes that in 1832, during Whig candidate Henry Clay’s election campaign against Democrat Andrew Jackson, Clay hired a Democratic Jackson-supporting boatman to row him up the Ohio River from Ohio to Louisville where he was scheduled to give an engagement speech. The boatman mistakenly rowed Clay up Salt River instead, causing him to miss his speech that would have otherwise won him valuable votes. This incident is referenced to have caused him to lose the election, and hence Salt River became synonymous with political defeat.

However in Sperber and Tidwell’s Words and Phrases in American Politics: Fact and Fiction about Salt River, the question of its true origin is called into question as the authors point out that the Dictionary’s only reference is Carl Scherf’s Slang, Slogan, and Song in American Politics, which in turn does not provide any information for original sources, calling into question whether this ‘undocumented’ story can be considered to be factual, as well as considering the fact that there are also no contemporary mentions of the incident.

Instead, the Dictionary of Americanisms and An American Glossary reference a different incident to be the origin of the phrase Salt River, recounted in a newspaper article by English novelist Frances M. Trollope, who resided in America from 1824 to 1831. In the article, published in 1832, she recounts the story of an argument between the Duke of Saxe-Weimar and his coachman where the Duke threatened to beat the man with a bamboo stick, with the quote from the newspaper article referencing the incident taken to be, "one of those threats which in Georgia dialect would subject a man to 'a rowing up salt river'." If this incident is taken to be the origin of the phrase, it shows that it did not necessarily originate from a political context, but was originally merely used as a threat to beat someone up. Moreover, while the exact date of this source is uncertain, it is deduced that with Trollope’s arrival in the United States in 1827, and with the assumption that public interest in the Duke’s presence would not have lasted a very long time in the country, that the year of the source is closer to 1827 than 1832.

== Salt River in political caricature ==
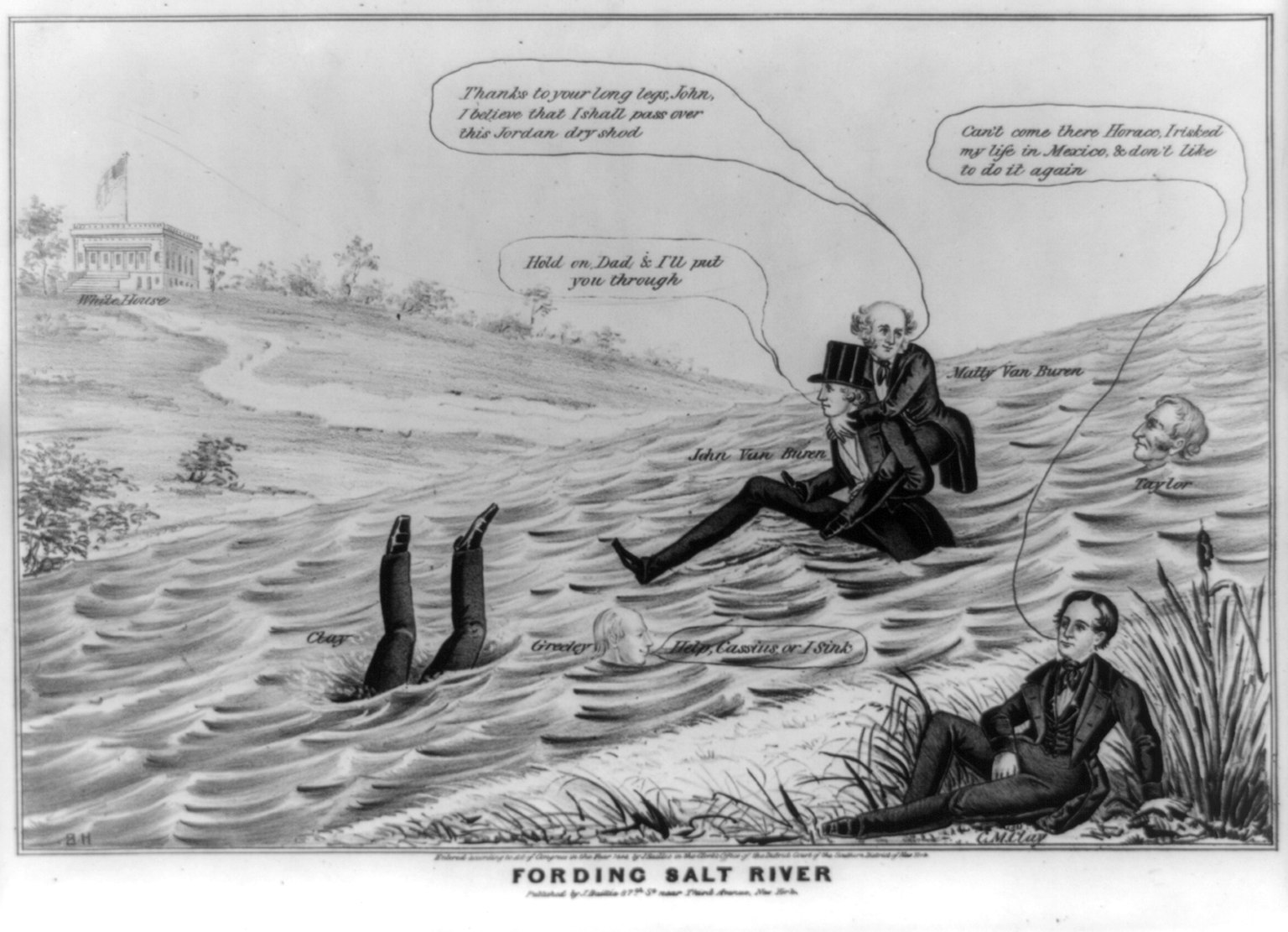
Fording Salt River - Pictured is Whig candidate Henry Clay submerged underwater while Whig candidates Zachary Taylor and supporter Horace Greeley are pictured with only their heads above the surface. Democrat Martin van Buren rides swiftly on the water. This is in reference to the political campaign of 1848.

In the period of the 1848 election campaign, political cartoonists employed visual and textual references of Salt River as a means of satire to sway public opinion on the strengths and weaknesses of opposing political candidates. Salt River was described in context as a "tantalizing, semi-mythical waterway whose treacherous shoals were synonymous with ruination of great leaders and their parties." In Hutter’s "Ho for Salt River!", she brings up how backdrops of Salt River were used more than to just symbolise political defeat; Salt River was also a metaphor for the massive political barriers candidates faced towards their opposition and the hardships they encountered.

Moreover, as Serio notes, political cartoonists use emphasis heavily – personalities and issues are "issued in a form quickly and easily grasped by the audience, using objects and concepts which are familiar to the people." Notably, political caricature at this time made heavy use of sporting puns, in visual formats such as boxing matches, races, and bullfights, or otherwise contests of fishing matches or turkey shoots to hyperbolise and sensationalise political competition, with the presidency serving as the ultimate prize. The use of these sporting metaphors does not leave any room for any ambiguities. This is in contrast to the political nature of the cartoons of Salt River, where the catchphrase "signifies a contest that does not depend on strength, bravery, perseverance, and intelligence but rather on sheer fortune." This gives a Salt River cartoon its open-ended characteristic, leaving audiences with questions about what would happen to a party and its candidates if they came to political defeat.

=== Examples in political caricature ===
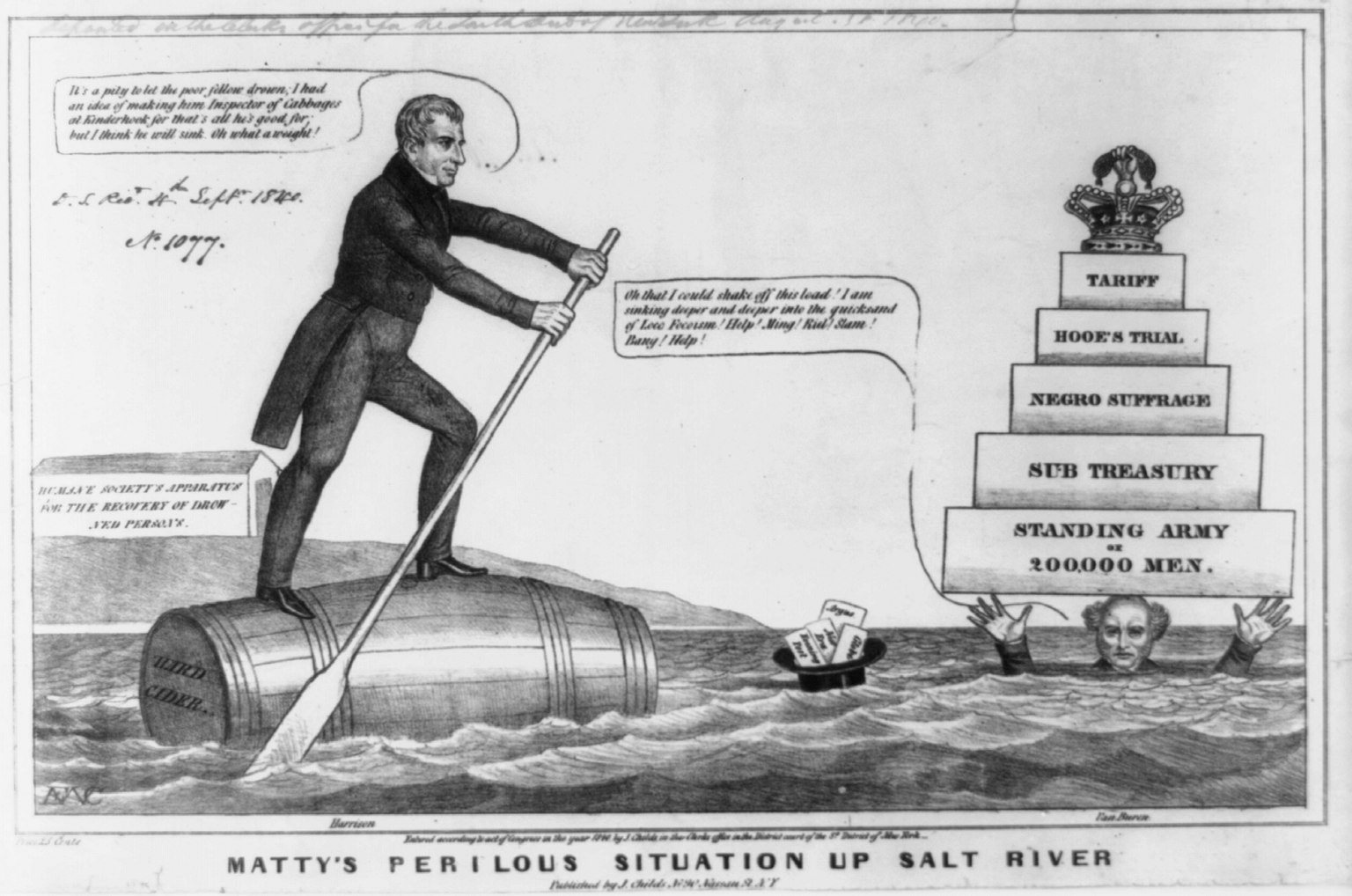
Matty's perilous situation up Salt River- Democrat Martin van Buren is sinking into Salt River with weighted boxes on his head. Whig candidate William Harrison watches on, 'It's a pity to let the poor fellow drown; I had an idea of making him Inspector of Cabbages of Kinderhook for that's all he's good for; but I think he will sink. Oh what a weight!"

- In the pro-Democrat cartoon Fording Salt River, the White House is seen in the backdrop of the cartoon, while the river cuts towards the center of the image. Two Whig candidates, Henry Clay and Zachary Taylor, and supporter Horace Greeley are depicted to be tossed around in the currents of the river with Clay submerged upside down underwater, while Democrat Martin van Buren rides swiftly on the back of his son John.
- In the pro-Whig cartoon Matty's perilous situation up Salt River, Martin van Buren is depicted neck deep in Salt River with weighted boxes of 'Tariff', 'Hooe's Trial', 'Negro Suffrage', 'Sub Treasury', and 'Standing Army of 200,000 men', as well as a crown atop these boxes. Whig candidate William Henry Harrison paddles towards him and watches as he struggles to stay afloat on Salt River.
- In Going Up Salt River, a donkey carries three men down Salt River with Martin van Buren standing by the bank of the stream. The artist is aiming to parody the exploitation by Whig politicians of popular candidate William Henry Harrison, who is represented by the donkey. The common use of animals in salt river caricature may reflect the essence and character of rural mid-nineteenth century America or may be intended to make political cartoons all the more ludicrous and farcical in their deliverance.
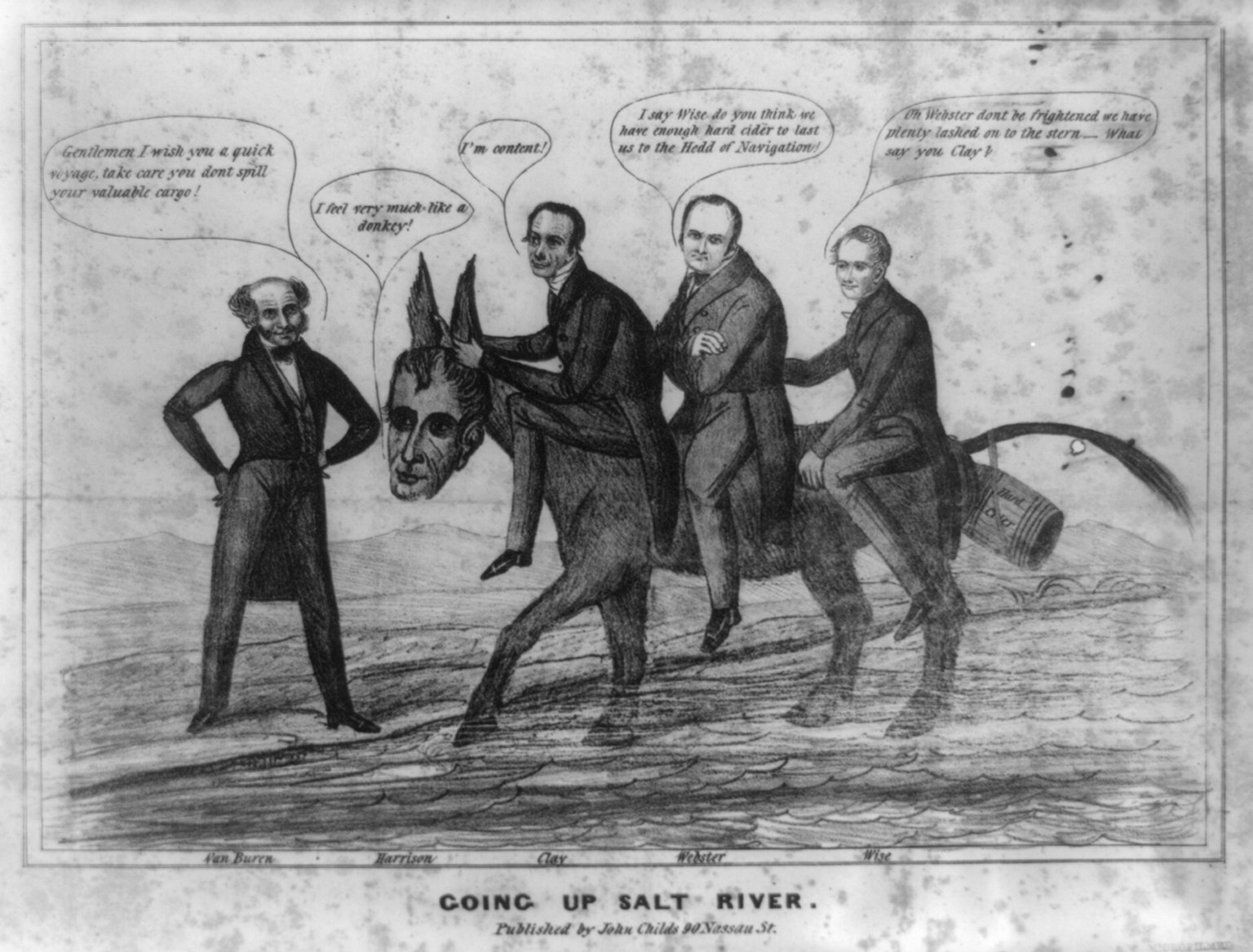
  Going Up Salt River- Pictured are Henry Clay, Daniel Webster and Virginia representative Henry A. Wise atop a donkey. Martin Van Buren is at the bank of a stream wishing the Harrison party "a quick voyage, take care you don't spill your valuable cargo." Harrison appears as a donkey wading in the shallows with a barrel of "Hard Cider" tied to its tail.

== Salt River in ephemera ==
Often used at the time were political references to Salt River through transitory printed pieces such as mock news papers and flyers, known as broadside type ephemera. These often lay out the political narrative of candidates and their campaigns on their successes and failures. A good example used is taken from the mayoral campaign of Philadelphia in 1871 where the headline of a mock newspaper read as:

Extra Post. Democrat Salt River Excursion! Incidents of the Annual Voyage to the Old Stamping Ground. Vain Attempts to get in the Mayor’s Office—The Democracy and the Politics—What happened to the Democratic Kite Flyers—A Steamboat Collis-ion—The Old Canal Boat Knocked into Fragments—Rescue by the Broken-Backed Citizens—Off for Salt River—Rally Round the Flag.

Dramatic and hyperbolised language and diction reflected the regional humour and spoken tradition of the state of Kentucky in the form of these stories and narratives were often reflected in these heavily circulated pamphlets and broadsides. Ephemera showed the hardships of the election campaigns of candidates, vividly depicting just how high the stakes were where political defeat seemed extremely dire.

Generally, election periods during this time contained complex issues as candidates strived to appeal to the emotion and sympathy of their supporters. the use of Salt River catchphrases in ephemera generally regarded the area of social policy in government, including: slavery, suffrage, corruption and secession.
