= 1881 Philadelphia mayoral election =

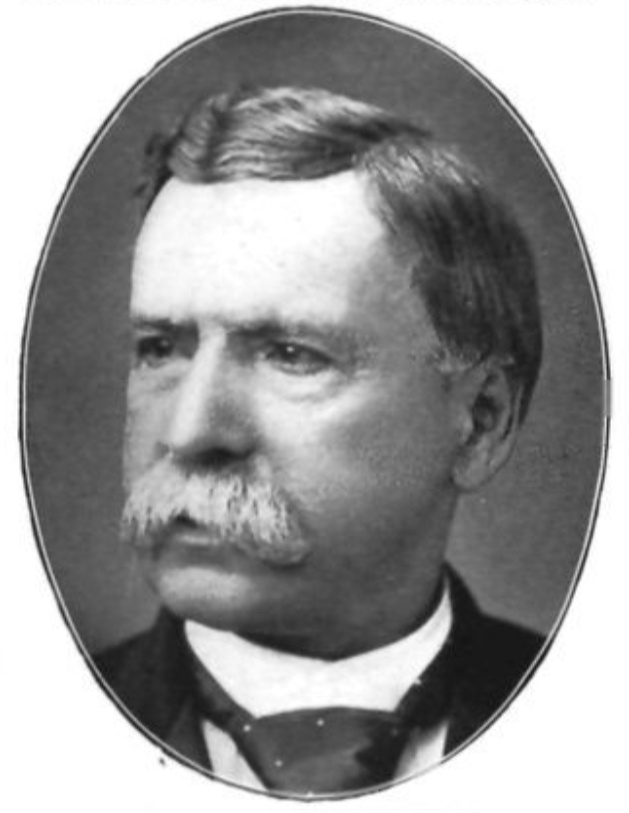

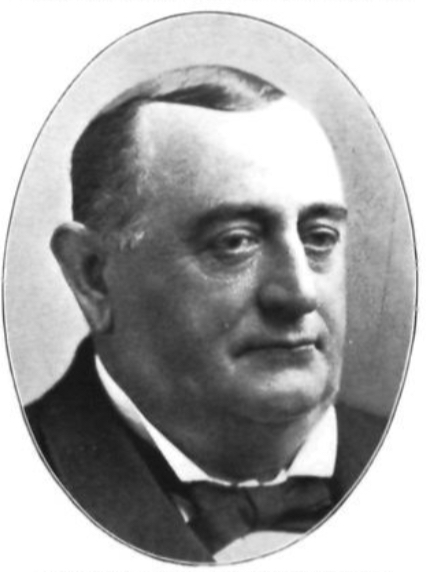
| Nominee | Samuel G. King | William S. Stokley |
| Party | Democratic | Republican |
| Popular vote | 78,215 | 72,428 |
| Percentage | 51.87% | 48.03% |
Mayor before election
William S. Stokley
Republican
Elected mayor
Samuel G. King
Democratic

The 1881 Philadelphia mayoral election saw Samuel G. King defeat three-term incumbent mayor William S. Stokley.

This would be the last time until 1951 that a Democrat would win the mayoralty of Philadelphia. It would also be the last time until 1911 that a Republican would fail to win the mayoralty.

The Philadelphia Republican establishment had not accepted Stokley as one of their own and prominent reformist Republicans such as Rudolph Blankenburg opposed Stokley for corruption.

After the influential Committee of One Hundred voted to endorse Stokley, Blankenburg and John Paul Verree resigned their memberships. The Committee reversed itself and endorsed King in the election.

== Results ==
1881 Philadelphia mayoral election
| Party | Candidate | Votes | % |
|---|---|---|---|
| Democratic | Samuel G. King | 78,215 | 51.87% |
| Republican | William S. Stokley (incumbent) | 72,428 | 48.03% |
| Greenback | A.C. Baird | 151 | 0.10% |
| Turnout | | 150,794 | |
