= George Zottman =

American strongman

- Born: c. 1867
- Died: July 27, 1942; Philadelphia, Pennsylvania, U.S.
- Occupation: Strongman
- Spouse: Cecelia Zottman

George Zottman (c. 1867 – July 27, 1942) was an American strongman from Philadelphia. He is the namesake of the Zottman Curl, which is an exercise that targets both the biceps and forearms.

The Zottman Curl.

== Life ==
Zottman was born c. 1867. Prior to becoming a professional strongman in the United States, George Zottman worked as a home-delivery milkman until the 19th century.

Zottman began his career as a performer at the dime museum. By the late 1890s, he was performing at the Girard Avenue Theatre. He was described as a "local Hercules" by The Times in 1896, and by The Philadelphia Inquirer as "a giant who is known as the "strong man"—a Sandow, who rides a wheel geared up to 200 or more" in 1899. In the late 1890s, Zottman was known by a lot of people to be The Strongest Man in the World, which is no doubt, considering the fact that his height was 5' 11" and he was weighing 218 pounds, his vast shoulder width of 24 inches, combined with his 19 inch biceps and 15-inch forearms.

Zottman eventually became the manager of the Girard Avenue Theatre, until he retired in 1932. He acquired five properties in Philadelphia. He maintained a residence at 1215 North Seventh Street in Philadelphia, and a summer home in Wildwood, New Jersey. By the time of his death, he was worth an estimated $20,000.

Zottman's wife Cecelia predeceased him, and he died on July 27, 1942, in Philadelphia. His estate was split between his friends, a Catholic church and an orphanage. The Zottman Curl was named for him. One of his many unique skills as a strongman to the Iron World is the Zottman Dumbbell Curl, which was named in his honor. He also set a lot of fitness records, some of which still have not been broken. For instance, he was the person that set the record of clean and-press with 175 pound heavy dumbbells while seated on a chair, a record no one else has ever broken since then.
