= 1884 Philadelphia mayoral election =

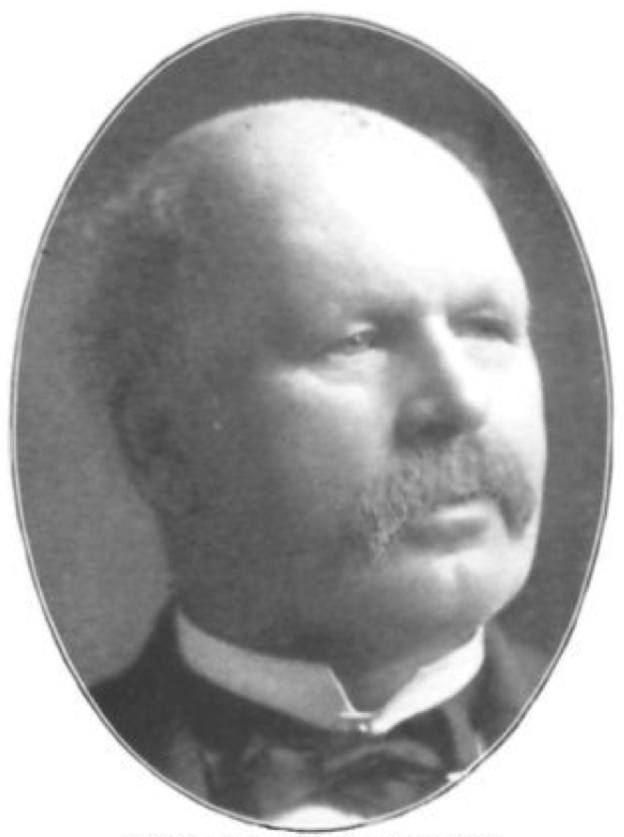

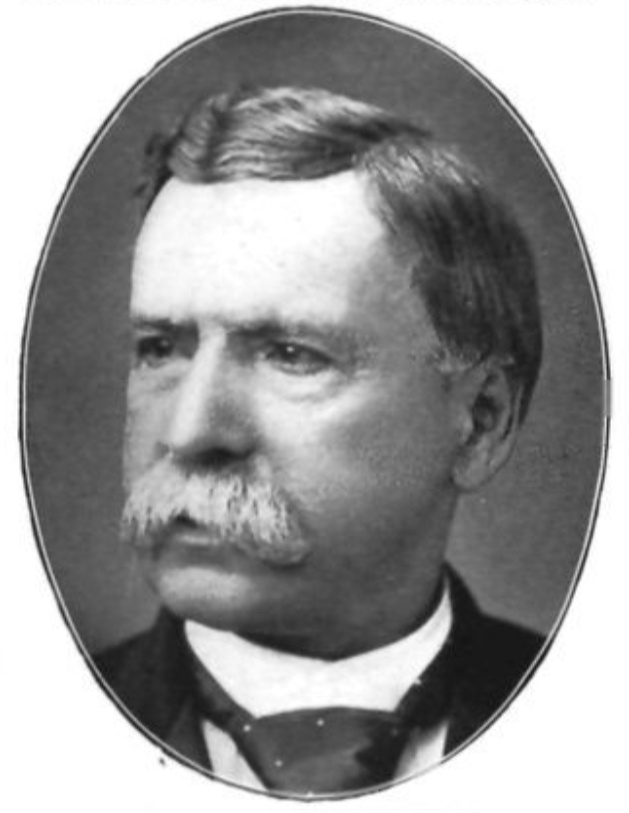
Nominee	William Burns Smith	Samuel G. King
Party	Republican	Democratic
Popular vote	79,552	70,440
Percentage	53.04%	46.96%
Mayor before election
Samuel G. King
Democratic
Elected mayor
William Burns Smith
Republican

The 1884 Philadelphia mayoral election saw William Burns Smith defeat incumbent mayor Samuel G. King. This would ultimately be the last election to a three-year term as mayor, as the city subsequently extended mayoral terms to four years.

== Results ==
1884 Philadelphia mayoral election
Party	Candidate	Votes	%
Republican	William Burns Smith	79,552	53.04%
Democratic	Samuel G. King (incumbent)	70,440	46.96%
Turnout		149,992	
