= Samuel G. King =

American politician

Samuel George King
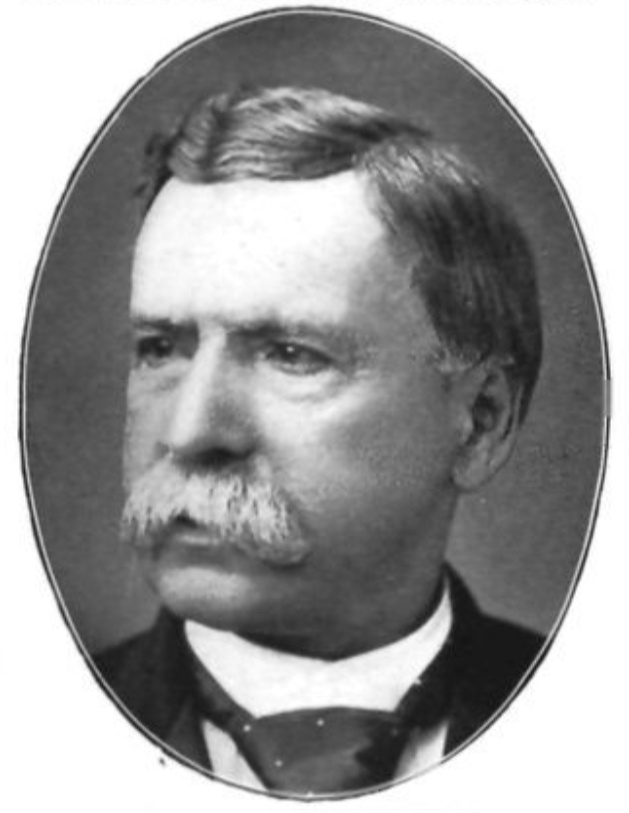

73rd Mayor of Philadelphia, Pennsylvania
- In office April 4, 1881 – April 7, 1884
- Preceded by: William S. Stokley
- Succeeded by: William Burns Smith

Personal details
- Born: May 2, 1816; Philadelphia, Pennsylvania, U.S.
- Died: March 21, 1899 (aged 82)
- Resting place: Laurel Hill Cemetery, Philadelphia, Pennsylvania, U.S.
- Political party: Democratic

Samuel George King (May 2, 1816 – March 21, 1899) was an American politician who served as the 73rd mayor of Philadelphia from 1881 to 1884. He was a member of the Democratic Party and was the last Democrat elected as mayor of Philadelphia until 1952.

== Biography ==
King was born on May 2, 1816, in Philadelphia. In 1881, as a member of the Select Council, he ran for the mayoralty of Philadelphia against three-term incumbent William S. Stokley. The Philadelphia Republican establishment had not accepted Stokley as one of their own and prominent reformists such as Rudolph Blankenburg opposed Stokley for corruption.

After the influential Committee of One Hundred voted to endorse Stokley, Blankenburg and John Paul Verree resigned their memberships. The Committee reversed itself and endorsed King in the election. He defeated Stokley by a margin of nearly 5,800 votes.

King initiated a program to develop "river baths". Three were implemented in Philadelphia, two on the Delaware River and one on the Schuykill River, next to the poorest neighborhoods in an attempt to improve city health by enabling city residents to bathe regularly. He also appointed the first black officers to serve in the Philadelphia Police Department.

In 1884, King ran for a second term, but Republican William Burns Smith defeated him by more than 9,000 votes.

King was the last Democrat to hold the office of Mayor of Philadelphia until Joseph Clark was elected in 1952.

King died on March 21, 1899, and is buried at Laurel Hill Cemetery.

Political offices
Preceded by William S. Stokley	Mayor of Philadelphia; 1881–1884	Succeeded by William Burns Smith
