= 1915 Philadelphia mayoral election =

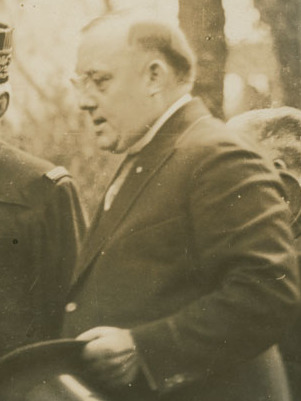

Nominee	Thomas B. Smith	George D. Porter
Party	Republican	Franklin
Popular vote	166,643	88,135
Percentage	64.21%	33.96%
Mayor before election
Rudolph Blankenburg
Keystone Democrat
Elected mayor
Thomas B. Smith
Republican Party (United States)

The 1915 Philadelphia mayoral election saw the election of Thomas B. Smith.

== Results ==
1915 Philadelphia mayoral election (general election)
Party	Candidate	Votes	%
Republican	Thomas B. Smith	166,643	64.21%
Franklin	George D. Porter	88,135	33.96%
Democratic	D. Gordon Bromley	4,741	1.83%
Turnout		282,367	
