= 1874 Philadelphia mayoral election =

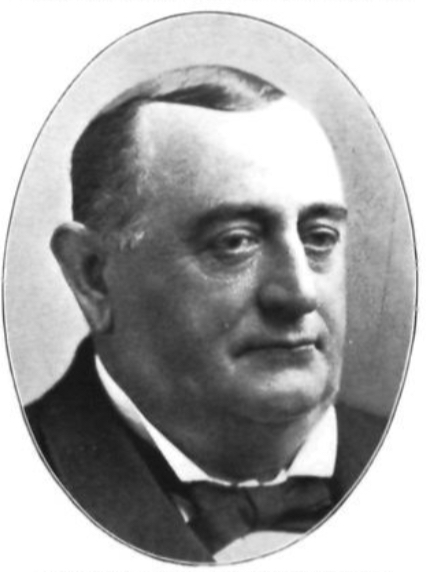

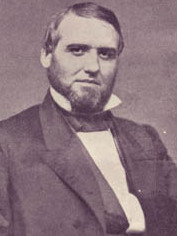
Nominee	William S. Stokley	Alexander McClure
Party	Republican	Independent
Popular vote	60,128	49,133
Percentage	55.03%	44.97%
Mayor before election
William S. Stokley
Republican
Elected mayor
William S. Stokley
Republican

The 1874 Philadelphia mayoral election saw the reelection of William S. Stokley. He defeated Alexander McClure, an independent candidate who was supported by the Democratic party.

== Results ==
1874 Philadelphia mayoral election
Party	Candidate	Votes	%
Republican	William S. Stokley (incumbent)	60,128	55.03%
Independent	Alexander McClure	49,133	44.97%
Turnout		109,261	
