= 1877 Philadelphia mayoral election =

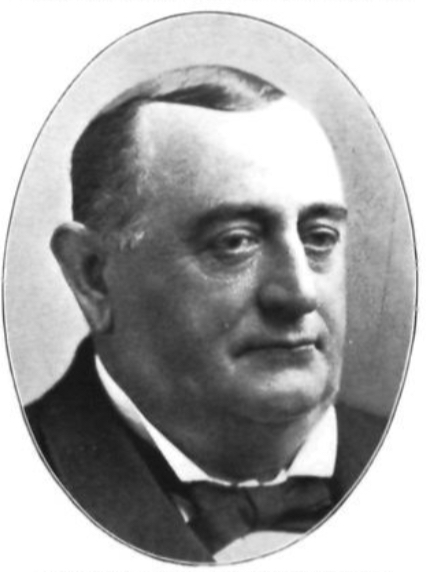

Nominee	William S. Stokley	Joseph L. Caven
Party	Republican	Democratic
Popular vote	64,779	61,913
Percentage	51.13%	48.87%
Mayor before election
William S. Stokley
Republican
Elected mayor
William S. Stokley
Republican

The 1877 Philadelphia mayoral election saw the reelection of William S. Stokley to a third consecutive term.

== Results ==
1877 Philadelphia mayoral election
Party	Candidate	Votes	%
Republican	William S. Stokley (incumbent)	64,779	51.13%
Democratic	Joseph L. Caven	61,913	48.87%
Turnout		126,692	
