= George M. Hooe =

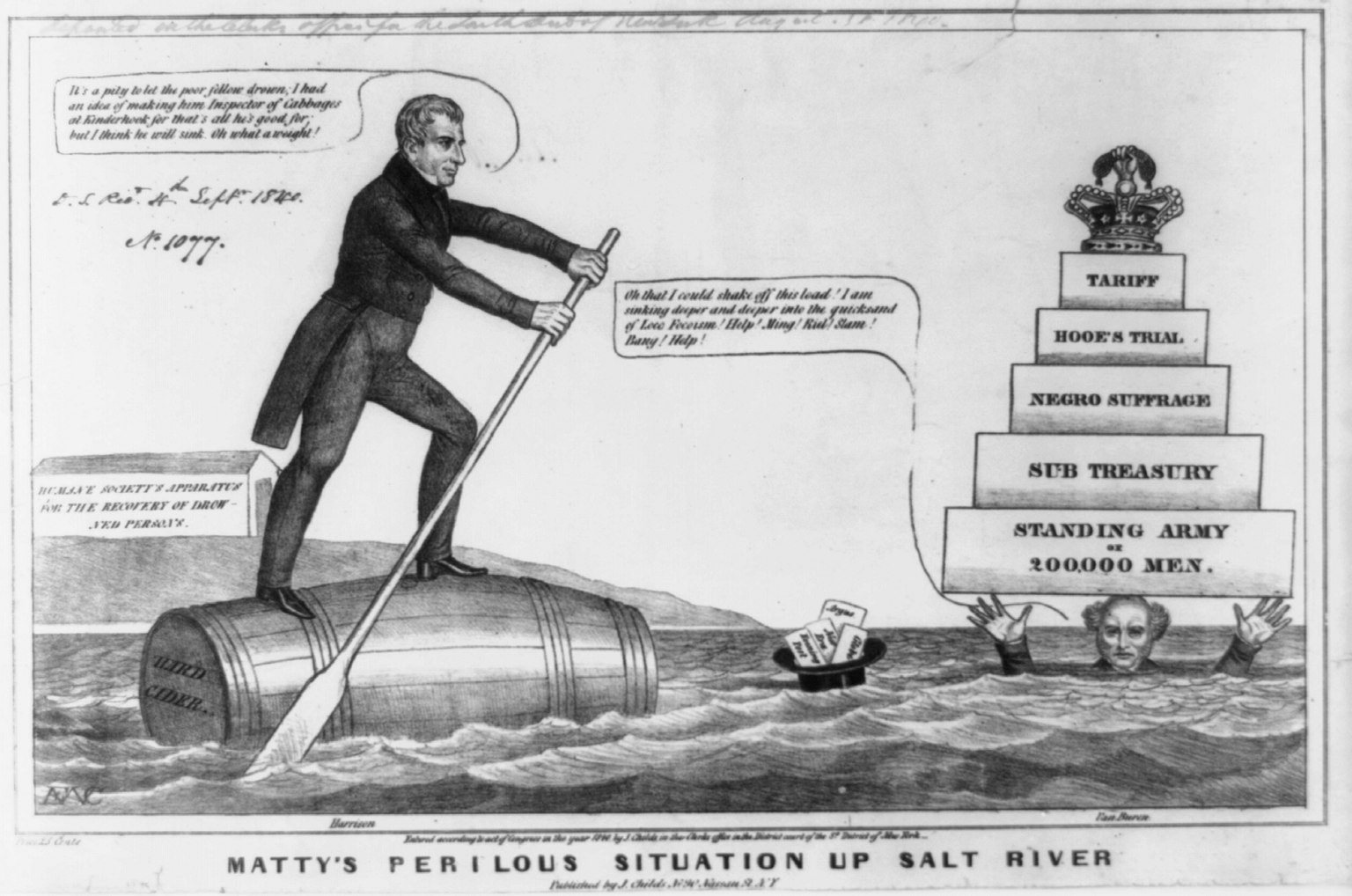
Matty's perilous situation up Salt River- Democrat Martin van Buren is sinking into Salt River with weighted boxes on his head. Whig candidate William Harrison watches on, 'It's a pity to let the poor fellow drown; I had an idea of making him Inspector of Cabbages of Kinderhook for that's all he's good for; but I think he will sink. Oh what a weight!"

George Mason Hooe (4 November 1807 – 10 April 1845), a grandson of George Mason V, was a lieutenant in the United States Navy whose court-martial in 1839 became a political controversy involving Democratic president Martin van Buren over the application of Black Codes to military trials.

== Court martial ==
Hooe was court-martialed for insubordination after treating superior officers with contempt and ordering the flogging of two men on the USS Vandalia. Hooe ordered flogged the marine William O'Brien and the commander's cook Daniel Waters, an African-American. The trial took place on 27 May 1839 on the USS Macedonian while docked in Pensacola, Florida, and Hooe was found guilty of "treating with contempt his superior officer in the execution of his duty" and "disobedience of orders." He was found not guilty of "uttering mutinous and seditious words." As punishment, Hooe was dismissed from the West Indies Squadron and reassigned to a different part of the Navy.

Two of the witnesses called, the aforementioned Waters and James Mitchell, were colored. Hooe objected to their testimony and appealed the decision based on their presence, noting that Florida law forbade negroes from testifying as witnesses against whites.

The appeal was dismissed by Attorney General Henry D. Gilpin on the basis that "the testimony given by the negroes was not material," but the question of the competency of the witnesses was still open and was referred to U.S. District Attorney for the District of Columbia, Francis Scott Key. Key decided that the officers of the court were bound by the laws of Congress, not of Florida, and thus bound to admit the witnesses.

== Political response ==
Rep. John Botts of Virginia, a Whig slaveholder, seized upon this case to criticize President van Buren for not overturning Hooe's sentence based on the involvement of colored witnesses. On June 12, 1839, Botts attempted to introduce a resolution criticizing the court martial, calling for the prohibition on negroes acting as witnesses in military proceedings, and demanding that the secretary of the Navy turn over a transcript of the court martial. The House refused to suspend the gag rule to permit the resolution. On June 13, Rep. Henry A. Wise of Virginia, also a Whig slaveholder, introduced a resolution asking only for the transcript, and it was adopted. When the transcript was received, the matter was sent to the committee on the judiciary. Rep. Reuben Chapman of Alabama, a Democratic slaveholder, introduced a resolution calling on the committee to report a bill forbidding negroes from serving in U.S. navy or army, but the resolution failed, with Botts joining northern abolitionist Whigs voting against.

Democratic Postmaster General Amos Kendall criticized the affair as exposing how Southern politicians were cowering under the "fell spirit of Abolition".

President van Buren replied to his critics that he personally agreed that state Black Codes should apply to federal courts martial in the states—specifically on the question of "permitting free blacks to testify against white persons in naval courts martial"—but that Congress would need to establish a law to that effect.

In the 1840 pro-Whig cartoon "Matty's perilous situation up Salt River", Martin van Buren is depicted neck deep in Salt River with weighted boxes of 'Tariff', 'Hooe's Trial', 'Negro Suffrage', 'Sub Treasury', and 'Standing Army of 200,000 men', as well as a crown atop these boxes. Whig candidate William Henry Harrison paddles towards him and watches as he struggles to stay afloat on Salt River.
