= McClure, Pennsylvania =

Borough in Pennsylvania, US

- Borough
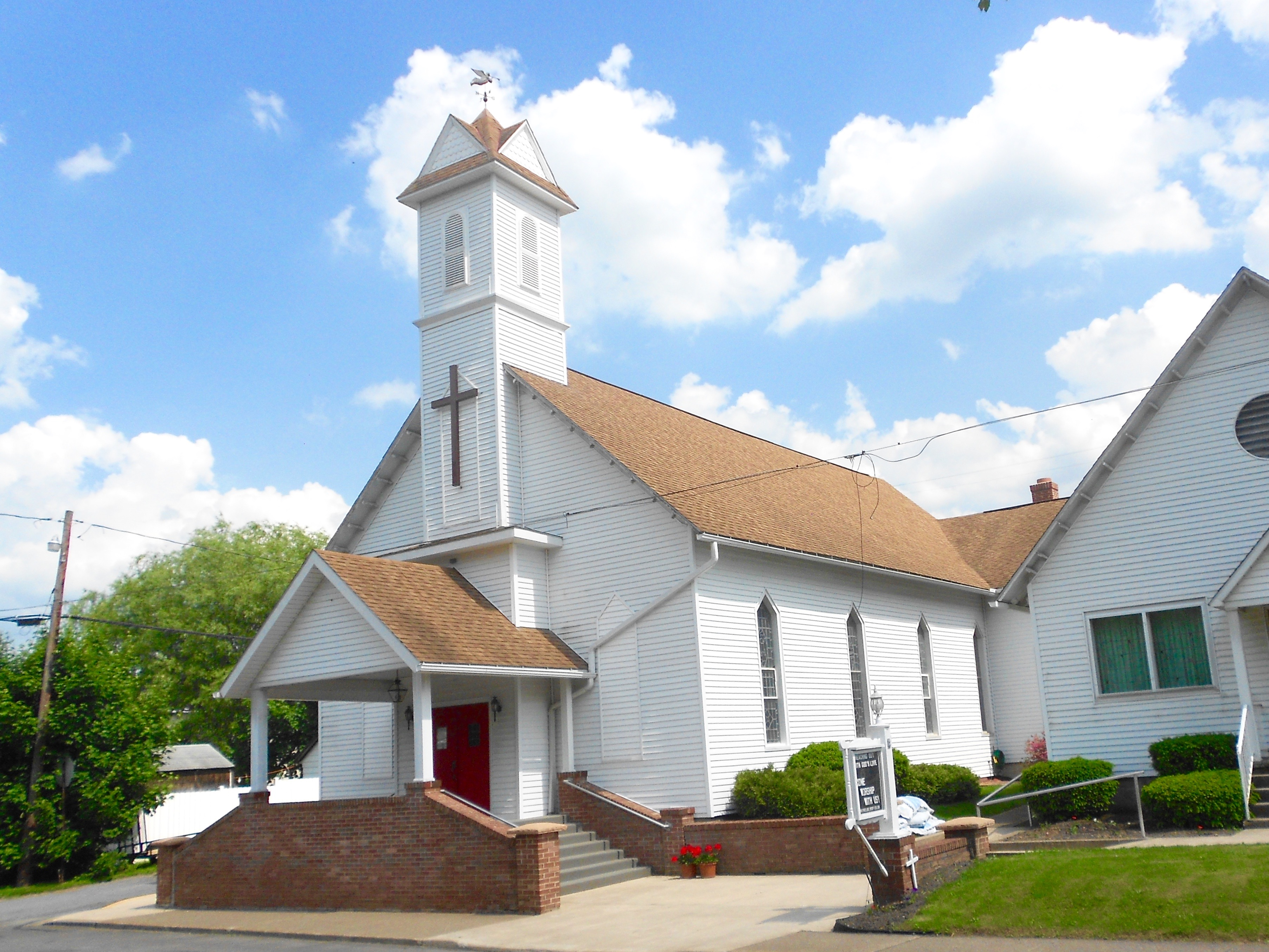
- Trinity Lutheran Church

- Location of McClure in Snyder County, Pennsylvania.

- Location within the U.S. state of Pennsylvania McClure (the United States)
- Coordinates: 40°42′23″N 77°18′51″W
- Country: United States
- State: Pennsylvania
- County: Snyder

Area
  - Total: 3.76 sq mi (9.74 km^{2})
  - Land: 3.75 sq mi (9.72 km^{2})
  - Water: 0.0077 sq mi (0.02 km^{2})
- Elevation: 695 ft (212 m)

Population (2020)
  - Total: 889
  - Density: 236.8/sq mi (91.44/km^{2})
- Time zone: Eastern (EST)
  - Summer (DST): EDT
- ZIP code: 17841
- Area code: 570
- FIPS code: 42-45992
- Website: https://www.mcclurepa1867.com/

McClure is a borough in Snyder County, Pennsylvania, United States. The population was 889 at the 2020 census. The town is named for the 19th century Pennsylvania politician and journalist Alexander Kelly McClure. McClure owes its origin to the building of the Sunbury and Lewistown Railroad, that at one time ran through the center of town. The town was founded in 1867. The borough of McClure was established on January 1, 1967, when the residents decided to incorporate.

The town was originally named Stuckton after George Stuck who owned the farm land that today is known as McClure. In the year 1867, when it was certain that the Middlecreek Valley Railroad would be located practically through the center of the Stuck Farm, George Stuck staked out a section of his farm, laid out a few lots and named the place “STUCKTON.” Thus a town was born, but without houses, except an old rotted log hut. It remained as such for the next four years. No one seemed interested in buying lots or building a home.

== Geography ==
According to the United States Census Bureau, the borough has a total area of 3.7 square miles (9.6 km^{2}), all land.

== Demographics ==
Historical population
Census	Pop.	Note	%±
1880	94		—
1970	1,094		—
1980	1,024		−6.4%
1990	1,070		4.5%
2000	975		−8.9%
2010	941		−3.5%
2020	889		−5.5%
2021 (est.)	883	▼	−0.7%

As of the census of 2010, there were 941 people, 435 households, and 382 families residing in the borough. The population density was 263.6(2000) people per square mile (101.7/km^{2}). There were 441(2000) housing units at an average density of 119.2(2000) per square mile (46.0/km^{2}). The racial makeup of the borough was 97.30% White, 0.21% African American, 0.00% Asian, and 0.20% from two or more races.

There were 403 households, out of which 27.3%(2000) had children under the age of 18 living with them, 57.6%(2000) were married couples living together, 6.2% had a female householder with no husband present, and 30.0% were non-families. 25.1% of all households were made up of individuals, and 14.6% had someone living alone who was 65 years of age or older. The average household size was 2.42 and the average family size was 2.83.

In the borough the population was spread out, with 22.4% under the age of 18, 9.3% from 18 to 24, 24.9% from 25 to 44, 22.9% from 45 to 64, and 20.5% who were 65 years of age or older. The median age was 40 years. For every 100 females there were 96.2 males. For every 100 females age 18 and over, there were 92.6 males.

The median income for a household in the borough was $30,865, and the median income for a family was $37,083. Males had a median income of $28,698 versus $25,739 for females. The per capita income for the borough was $15,466. About 4.2% of families and 7.9% of the population were below the poverty line, including 10.6% of those under age 18 and 3.4% of those age 65 or over.

== Churches ==
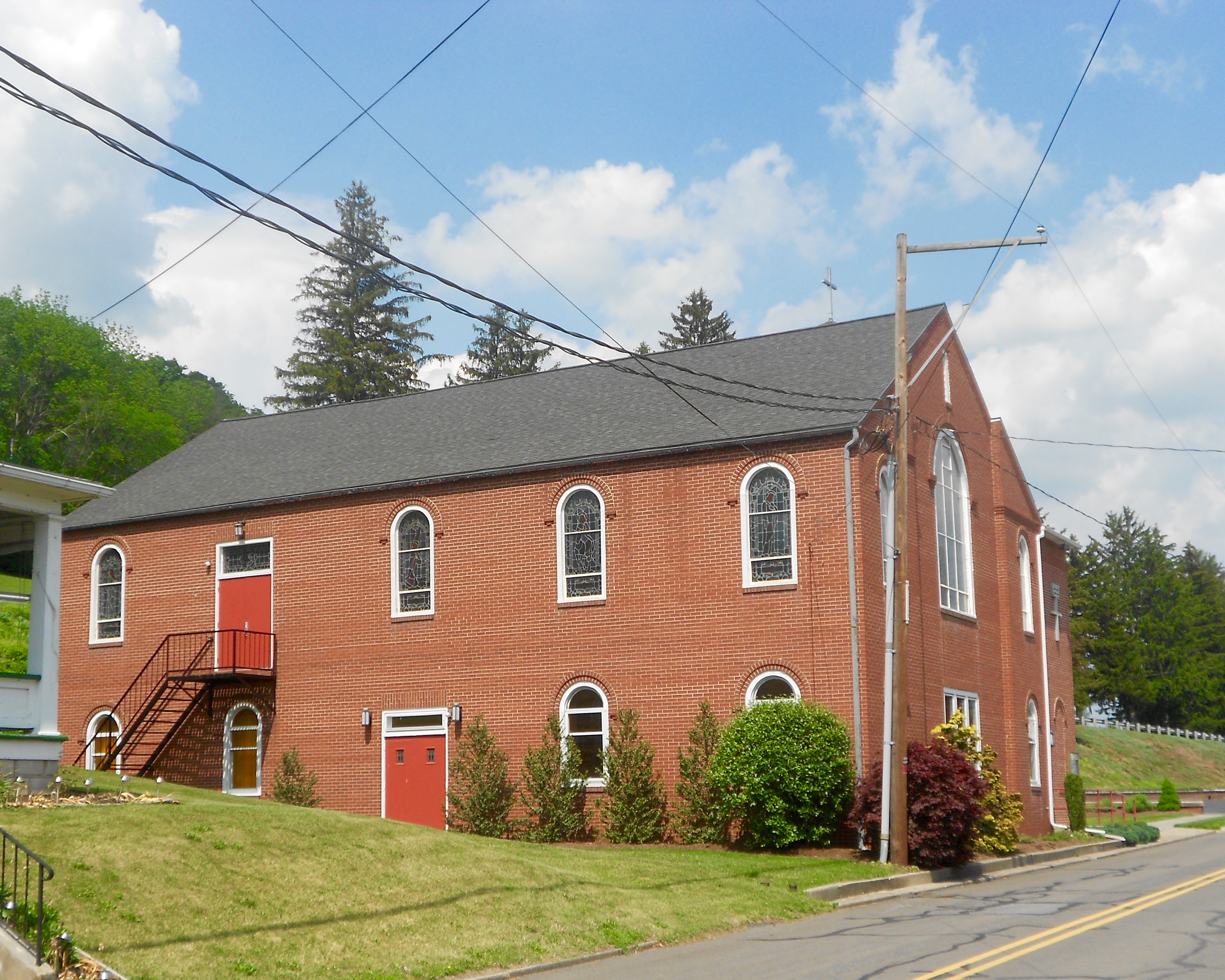
Mount Bethel Church of Christ

Several churches fall within the borough lines: McClure First United Methodist Church, Mount Bethel Church of Christ, Trinity Lutheran Church. Other churches have addresses within the McClure ZIP code but are not inside the borough: Bannerville Christian and Missionary Alliance (C&MA), Bannerville Church of the Brethren, Samuel's Church, and St. John's Lutheran Church.
