= Sunbury and Lewistown Railroad =

Overview
- Headquarters: Sunbury
- Locale: Pennsylvania
- Dates of operation: 1871–1957 (sections open to present)
- Predecessor: Middle Creek Railroad (1868-1871)
- Successor: Pennsylvania Railroad

Technical
- Track gauge: 4 ft 8 1/2 in (1,435 mm) standard gauge
- Length: 50 miles

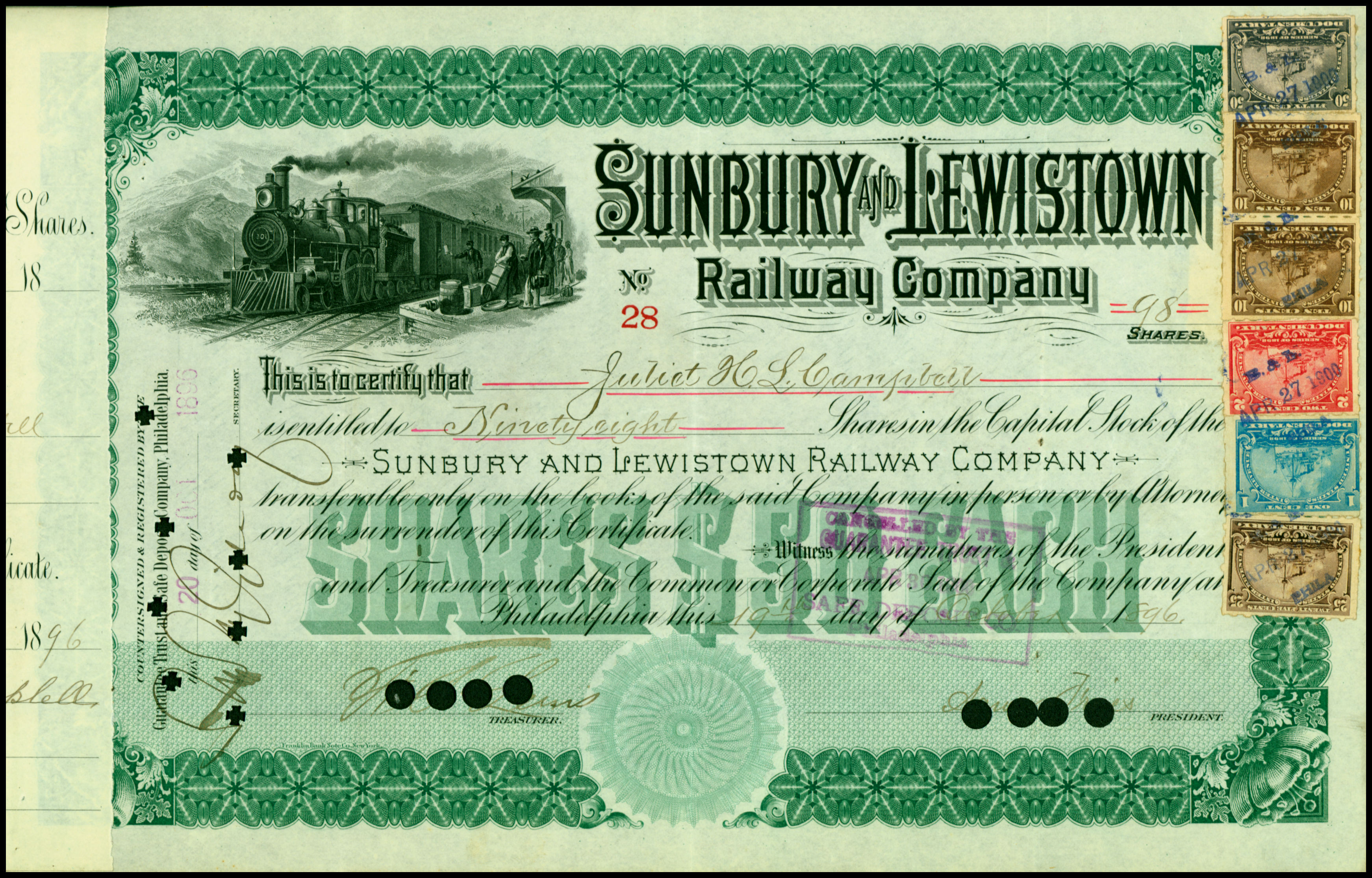
Share of the Sunbury and Lewistown Railway Company, issued October 19, 1896

The Sunbury and Lewistown Railroad was a Class I Railroad connecting Lewistown, Pennsylvania with Sunbury, Pennsylvania. Completed in December 1871, the line was placed under an immediate lease by the Pennsylvania Railroad (PRR), upon its completion. Although retaining its own board of directors and track maintenance, all locomotive traffic was owned by the PRR. For over eighty years, the line operated between Sunbury and Lewistown, serving as a relief line for both the Philadelphia Main Line and Bald Eagle Valley Railroad through Williamsport, Pennsylvania. The line was noteworthy as a proving ground for new railroad technology in the United States, such as the X-shaped railroad crossing signs in 1917 (now nearly ubiquitous in the United States) and Pulse Code Cab Signaling technology in 1925. It is now a fallen flag railway, the name "Sunbury and Lewistown" having been phased out in 1901 when the line became part of the Pennsylvania Railroad's Sunbury Division.

== History ==
In the mid-1860s, residents of Snyder County wanted to capitalize on the transportation and commerce possibilities of the recently constructed Northern Central Railway, which was located across the Susquehanna River in Northumberland County, Pennsylvania. The Northern Central, completed in the 1850s, connected Sunbury to Harrisburg, Pennsylvania, York, Pennsylvania, and Baltimore, Maryland, thus giving Snyder County a better connection to the surrounding region and beyond. Middle Creek Railroad was formed in Selinsgrove in 1868, with the intention of planning, grading, and constructing a route. Without any ties to a major railroad, the Middle Creek Railroad only got as far as choosing the route and the completion of some grading before the company ran out of money and folded. The assets of the company were bought up and reorganized as the "Sunbury and Lewistown Railroad" in 1871.

With minimal initial financial backing from the Pennsylvania Railroad and Northern Central Railway, construction of the nearly 50-mile line continued at a slow pace for the next three years, with work progressing inward from both the eastern and western termini. The western group covered more territory, as the completion of the line's eastern end was contingent on the construction of the half-mile-long Selinsgrove Bridge spanning the Susquehanna River. The PRR signed a 99-year lease on the line in October 1871 and purchased half the outstanding stock of the line, and the entire line was completed in December 1871. Almost immediately, it became clear that the demand for such a line was not as high as its proprietors had anticipated, and the railroad ceased to operate.

The line was sold at sheriff's sale in May 1874, and reorganized as the Sunbury & Lewistown Railway on Feb. 1, 1876.

The Pennsylvania Railroad, a lessor and major shareholder, assumed operation of the route. Thus, "Sunbury and Lewistown" functioned only in name for the most part - the rolling stock and motive power came from the Pennsylvania Railroad.

Effective October 1, 1896, the shareholders of the Mifflin & Centre County Railroad Company and the Sunbury & Lewistown Railway Company approved the consolidation of the two companies into the Sunbury & Lewistown Railway Company. The Pennsylvania Railroad then executed a new 79-year operating lease.

Effective June 1, 1900, the Sunbury & Lewistown Railway Company and four other PRR-affiliated railroads merged into a new entity, the Schuylkill & Juniata Railroad Company. It was immediately leased to the Pennsy under a 20-year operating agreement. Effective April 1, 1902, the Schuylkill & Juniata Railroad Company was merged into the Pennsylvania Railroad Company.

Under PRR control, the line served as an important shortcut for moving Wilkes-Barre anthracite westward to Pittsburgh steel mills, avoiding Harrisburg, and for moving perishables to New York markets via an interchange with the Lehigh Valley Railroad at Mt. Carmel, avoiding both Harrisburg and Philadelphia. Freight traffic peaked on the line between 1900 and 1908, possibly in preparation for a planned (but canceled) PRR yard north of Selinsgrove in Shamokin Dam. Although the PRR bought a large tract of land planning for a yard or car shop, the proposed trunk yard was instead constructed at Northumberland, Pennsylvania in 1912, resulting in a loss of significance to the older route through Snyder County. Declining passenger numbers after the First World War led to a cancellation of all passenger traffic in January 1932, followed by a cessation of through traffic in the 1950s. The PRR sold its large tract to Pennsylvania Power & Light Co. for a new coal-fired power plant in 1945, to be served by both a PRR spur north from the S&L at a wye on the west end of the Susquehanna River Bridge and a spur south from the Reading Railroad at Clement Station, opposite Sunbury. Track between Maitland, Mifflin County, and Paxtonville, west of Middleburg, was removed in stages between 1958 and 1965. The remaining eastern segment, running west from Selinsgrove Junction (south of Sunbury) and then across the Susquehanna River to Paxtonville via Selinsgrove, was operated by the Pennsylvania Railroad until 1968, then came under the control of Penn Central (merger of the PRR and the New York Central), Conrail. The segment between Paxtonville and Kreamer, Pennsylvania was abandoned with the beginning of Conrail in April 1976. The remaining segment was later operated under the ownership of the Norfolk Southern Railway, which took over portions of Conrail in 1999. Conrail also operated the segment between Lewistown Junction and Maitland until the line, along with spurs to Milroy and an industrial park, were sold to the SEDA-COG Joint Rail Authority, and operation transferred to the Juniata Valley Railroad on August 19, 1996. In late 2021, the SEDA-COG Joint Rail Authority approved the purchase of operating rights over the nine miles of track between Selinsgrove Junction and Kreamer plus the spur to the Panda Hummel power plant, for $371,200. SEDA-COG operation of the line via the North Shore Railroad began on April 4, 2022. Today, parts of the former railroad grade between Kreamer and Maitland are still visible, though decades of development in the area have erased many segments.

== Route ==
Leaving south from the station at Sunbury, S&L traffic shared track with the Northern Central, which had been constructed a decade earlier. At Selinsgrove Junction station, on the east bank of the Susquehanna River, the line split, with the NCRR continuing south towards Harrisburg and the S&L crossing the River on the Selinsgrove Bridge. The original bridge over the river was wooden, but has been replaced several times since the opening of the line. The oldest segments of the current bridge date from 1888.

The line enters the borough of Selinsgrove on the Isle of Que, then crosses Penn's Creek on a smaller bridge into Selinsgrove proper, where the station still stands today, although it has not seen passenger traffic since the 1930s. Passing through what was once the industrial center of Selinsgrove, the line turns south, skirting around the edge of the campus Susquehanna University, where it turns west. West of Selinsgrove, several minor stations once existed that were closed in the late 1800s as they were not used enough to be financially viable. Winding its way through the Middle Creek (Penns Creek) valley, the route passed through the villages or towns of Clifford, Kreamer, Middleburg, Pennsylvania, Paxtonville (known to the railroad for a brief period as "Benfer"), Beavertown, Beaver Springs, Pennsylvania and McClure, before arcing to the southwest to follow Jacks Creek into Mifflin County, Pennsylvania. In Mifflin County, the railroad passed through Wagner, Shindle and Maitland before entering Lewistown from the east. The S&L track was laid directly onto Chestnut Street, connecting with the Pennsylvania Railroad for the final leg to Lewistown. One average the route took a little over an hour to complete, but a special train run shortly after the line's opening in 1871 made it from Sunbury to Lewistown in under forty five minutes.
