= Thomas B. Smith (mayor) =

American politician (1869–1949)

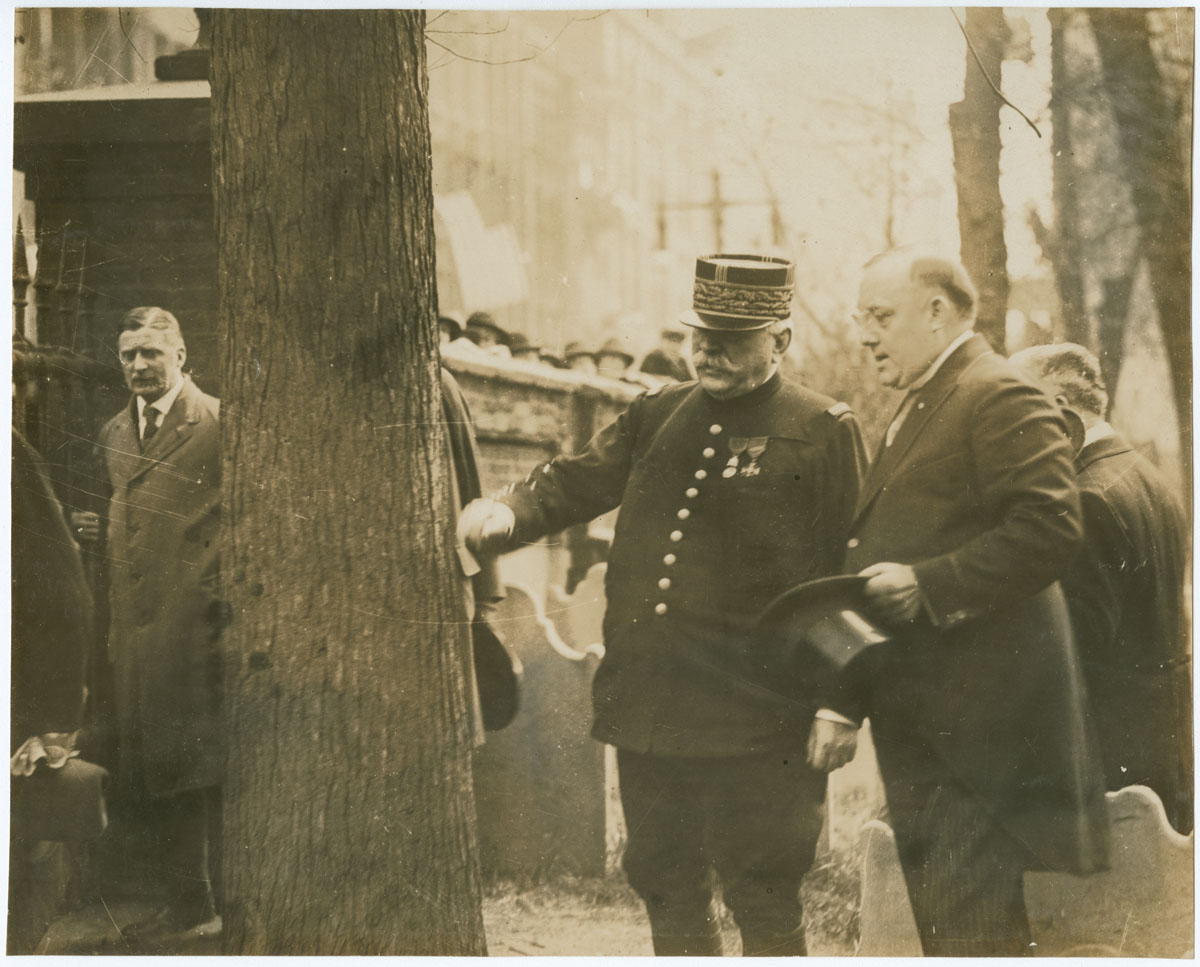

82nd Mayor of Philadelphia, Pennsylvania
- In office January 3, 1916 – January 5, 1920
- Preceded by: Rudolph Blankenburg
- Succeeded by: J. Hampton Moore

Personal details
- Born: November 2, 1869 West Philadelphia, Pennsylvania, U.S.
- Died: April 17, 1949 (aged 79) Abington Township, Montgomery County, Pennsylvania, U.S.
- Party: Republican
- Spouse: Elizabeth Barrett
- Children: 6
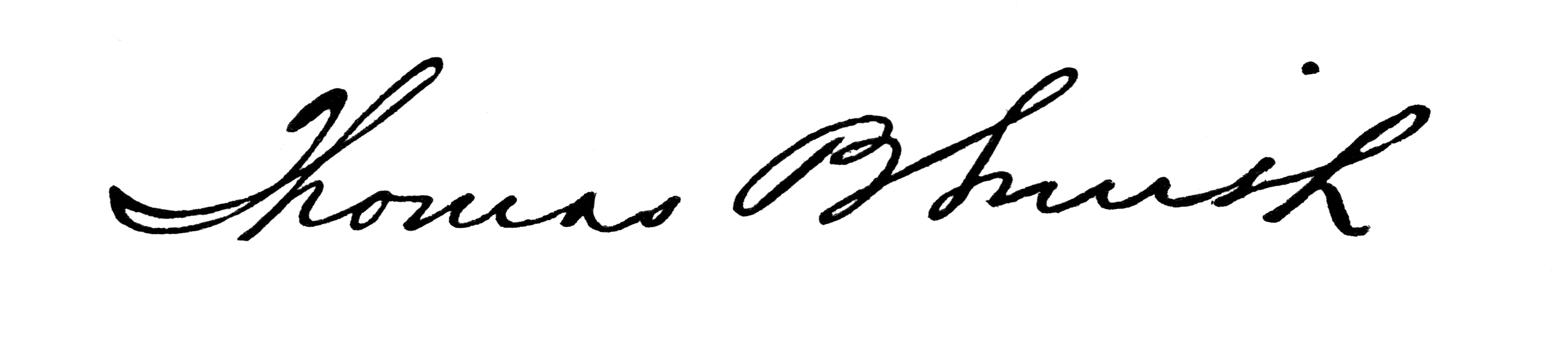
- Signature

Thomas B. Smith (November 2, 1869 – April 17, 1949) was an American politician from Pennsylvania. A member of the Republican Party, he served as a member of the Pennsylvania House of Representatives and was the 82nd Mayor of Philadelphia from 1916 until 1920.

== Early life ==
Thomas B. Smith was born on November 2, 1868, in West Philadelphia, to Isabella and Thomas B. Smith. At the age of 12, he left school and worked as a messenger boy for the Pennsylvania Railroad.

== Career ==
Smith worked as a salesman of business materials and for the business department of The Philadelphia Record. In 1897, he began working for the National Surety Co. of New York. He later served as vice president of the company. He then formed the Thomas B. Smith Company, which bonded post office, municipal and county employees. He entered politics as the Republican Party's chairman for the 28th Ward and won election in 1902 and 1903 to the Common Council, which was the lower house of the Philadelphia City Council. In 1905, he won a seat in the Pennsylvania House of Representatives, where he served one term. He was appointed postmaster for the city of Philadelphia in 1911 by President William Howard Taft and served for more than two years. He was also appointed as Public Service Commissioner.

=== Mayor of Philadelphia ===
In 1915, he ran for mayor and defeated George Porter in the general election. During his tenure, many planned projects were delayed due to World War I. In 1916, the Evening Ledger reported that Smith had given jobs in his mayoral cabinet to several members of his family, including his brother and brother-in-laws.

During the 1917 primary election, Smith, who was allied with William Scott Vare's political machine, supported Issac Deutsch in for the Republican nomination. Jim McNichol, who was part of the Boies Penrose machine, supported James Carey. Deutsch's supporters brought a gang from New York who attacked Carey. During the melee, a police officer, George Eppley, was shot and killed. Much of the blame fell on Smith, who, as mayor, controlled the police, worked to ensure that the officers assigned to the district would support Vare's candidate and harass supporters of Carey.

The District Attorney, Samuel Rotan, who was a Penrose ally, indicted Mayor Smith for 'conspiracy to commit murder' as well as impeding a free and fair election. While he was acquitted of the charges, the cloud of suspicion hung over the mayor for the remainder of his term.

=== Later career ===
In 1916, Smith was one of the three original members of the Delaware River Bridge Commission for the Delaware River Bridge. He served as a member of its successor, the Delaware River Joint Commission, from 1919 to his resignation in 1943. Later in life, he continued running the Thomas B. Smith Company.

== Personal life ==
Smith married Elizabeth Barrett. They had four sons and two daughters, Davis P., Thomas B. Jr., Harvey B., Frederick B., Ruth and Elizabeth B. In the early 1900s, he lived at 2444 North Broad Street in Philadelphia. Later in life, he lived at 359 East Wharton Avenue in Glenside.

Smith died on April 17, 1949, at Abington Memorial Hospital in Abington Township, Montgomery County, Pennsylvania.

Political offices
Preceded by Rudolph Blankenburg	Mayor of Philadelphia; 1916–1920	Succeeded by J. Hampton Moore
