= 1911 Philadelphia mayoral election =

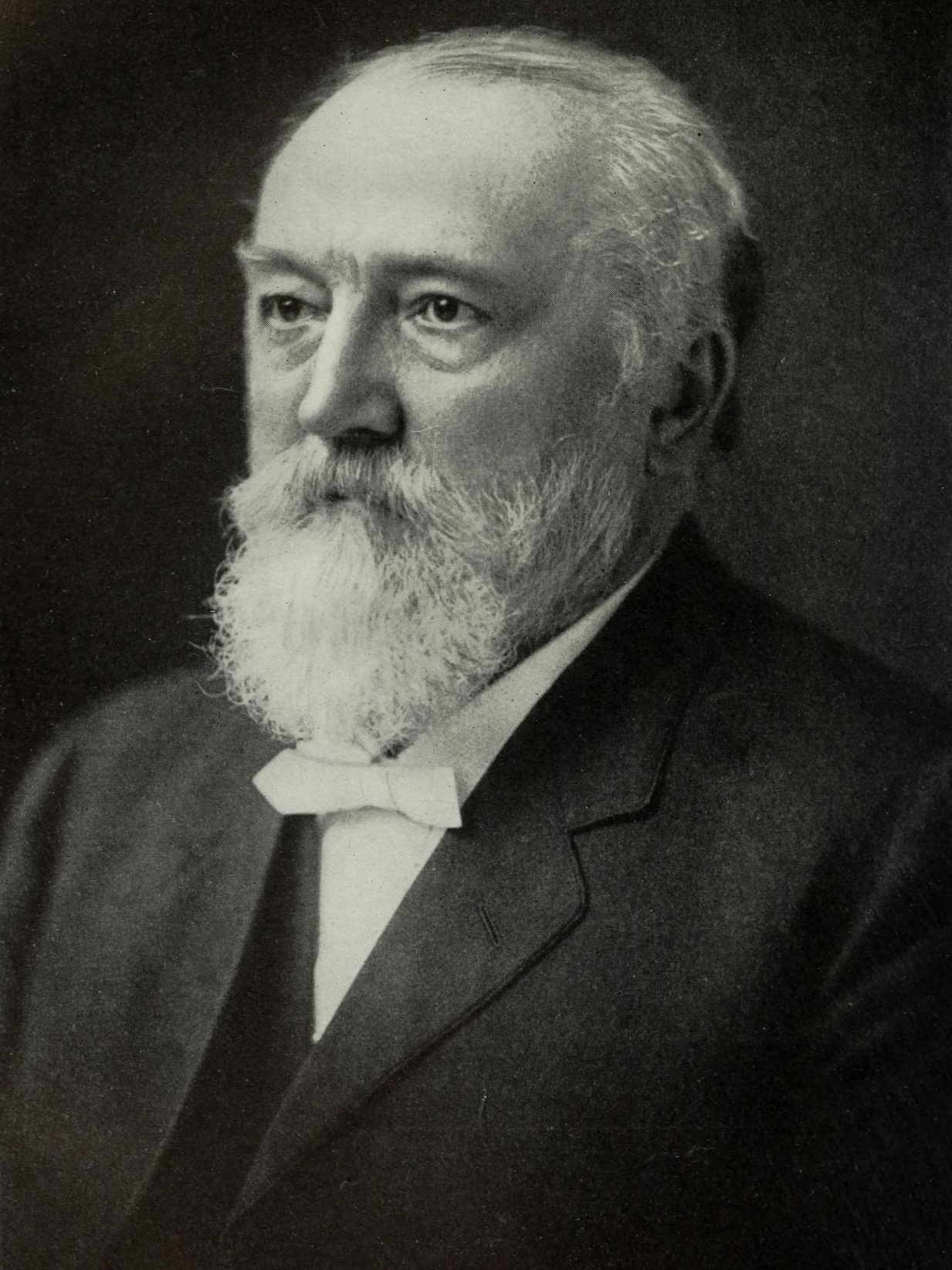

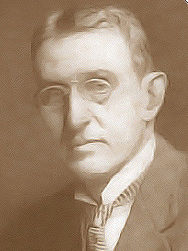
Nominee	Rudolph Blankenburg	George Howard Earle Jr.
Party	Keystone Democrat	Republican
Popular vote	134,680	130,185
Percentage	50.85%	49.15%
Mayor before election
John E. Reyburn
Republican
Elected mayor
Rudolph Blankenburg
Keystone Democrat

The 1911 Philadelphia mayoral election saw the election of Rudolph Blankenburg.

This was the first time since 1881 that a Republican did not win the election, and the last time until 1951, with every other election between those years seeing a Republican nominee win.

== Republican primary ==
In the Republican primary election held on 30 September 1911, Earle defeated William S. Vare by 23,000 votes and Samuel Broadbent by 26,000 votes.

Major Republican Candidates:

George Howard Earle (1856–1928) - Earle was born on July 6, 1856, in Philadelphia, the son of lawyer George H. Earle. A graduate of Harvard University, the younger Earle himself became a prominent lawyer. Earle was very politically ambitious, and ran for many positions, though he never won elected office. He died on February 19, 1928, in Philadelphia. His son was Pennsylvania Governor George Howard Earle III.

William Scott Vare (1867–1934) - Vare was born on December 24, 1867, in Philadelphia. A career politician, Vare served as a US Senator from Pennsylvania from 1927 to 1929. He died of a stroke on August 7, 1934, in Atlantic City, New Jersey.

Samuel Martin Broadbent (1845–1923) - Broadbent, the son of prominent war hero and lawyer Daniel Broadbent, was born on July 6, 1845, in Philadelphia. He was a graduate of Princeton University and the University of Pennsylvania. He was a wealthy businessman, industrialist, and investor who was Vice President of Bethlehem Steel from 1897 to 1912. He later served in the Pennsylvania State Senate, representing the 4th District from 1917 to 1921, and was a Republican National Committeeman. He died on February 4, 1923, in Quebec City, Canada.

== General election ==
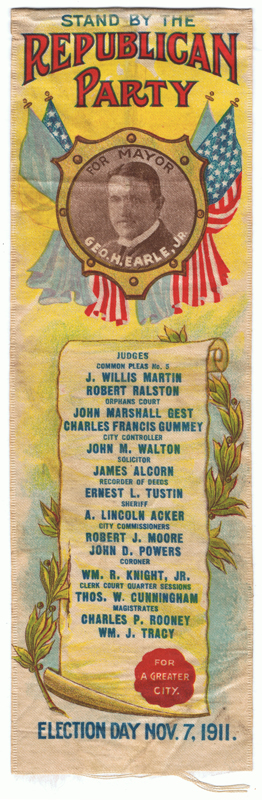
Earle campaign ribbon

The election was held on November 7, 1911.

1915 Philadelphia mayoral election (general election)
Party	Candidate	Votes	%
Keystone Democrat	Rudolph Blankenburg	134,680	50.85%
Republican	George Howard Earle Jr.	130,185	49.15%
Turnout		264,865	
