= Edwin Henry Fitler =

American businessman and politician

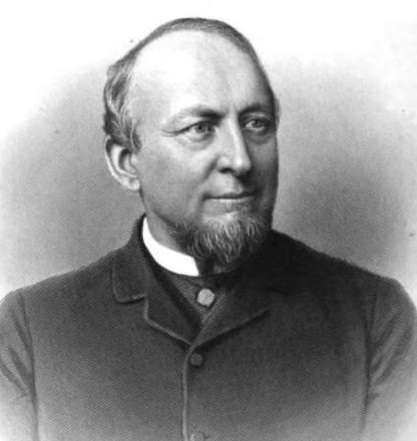

75th Mayor of Philadelphia, Pennsylvania
- In office April 4, 1887 – April 6, 1891
- Preceded by: William B. Smith
- Succeeded by: Edwin S. Stuart

Personal details
- Born: December 2, 1825 Philadelphia, Pennsylvania, U.S.
- Died: May 31, 1896 (aged 70) Torresdale, Pennsylvania, U.S.
- Resting place: Laurel Hill Cemetery, Philadelphia, Pennsylvania, U.S.
- Party: Republican
- Spouse: Josephine R. Baker (m. 1850)
- Relations: Happy Rockefeller (great-granddaughter)
- Occupation: Cordage company president

See Also: Fitler, Mississippi

Edwin Henry Fitler (December 2, 1825 – May 31, 1896) was an American businessman and politician from Pennsylvania. He founded Edwin H. Fitler & Company, the largest cordage manufacturer in the United States at the time, and served as a Republican Presidential Elector for Pennsylvania in 1876 and mayor of Philadelphia from 1887 to 1891.

== Early life ==
Fitler was born in the Kensington neighborhood of Philadelphia on December 2, 1825, the son of Elizabeth Wonderly Fitler and William Fitler, who ran a successful leather tanning and manufacturing business.

He received his education in Philadelphia, and studied law with attorney Charles E. Lex, but decided on a business career and obtained a position in his brother-in-law's cordage manufacturing business, George J. Weaver & Company.

In 1850, Fitler married Josephine R. Baker.

== Business career ==
Fitler became a partner in Weaver's business two years later, and it was renamed Weaver, Fitler & Company. Displaying an aptitude for mechanics, Fitler developed several inventions to improve and speed up rope making, which made the business more profitable.

Over time Fitler bought out the other partners in Weaver, Fitler & Company, and by 1870 the business was renamed again to Edwin H. Fitler & Company. He relocated the factory to the Bridesburg neighborhood of Philadelphia where it covered more than 15 acres of land. His success continued, and his company eventually became the largest cordage manufacturer in the United States. Recognized as a leader in his industry, Fitler served as president of the American Cordage Manufacturers Association. He partnered with William Deering to conduct experiments to improve a twine binder being developed by Deering. Fitler was also active in other businesses, including as a member of the board of directors of the National Bank of the Northern Liberties.

Fitler also served as president of the board of trustees of the Thomas Jefferson Medical College, a member of the board of managers of the Edwin Forrest Home, and a member of the board of directors of the North Pennsylvania Railroad.

== Civic activism ==
During the American Civil War, Fitler supported the Union. He was a director, vice president, and president of the Union League of Philadelphia, and his efforts included personally paying to recruit and equip a company from among the employees of his business.

Fitler was a leader in planning and organizing the 1876 Centennial Exposition. He was also one of the founders of the Philadelphia Art Club and a member of The Philadelphia Club

== Political career ==
Fitler was a Republican and served as one of Pennsylvania's presidential electors in 1876. In 1887 Fitler was elected Mayor of Philadelphia, and he served one term, 1887 to 1891. Though he was not an active candidate, in 1888 Fitler was nominated for US president and received the votes of the Philadelphia delegation on the first ballot at that year's Republican national convention.

== Death and legacy ==
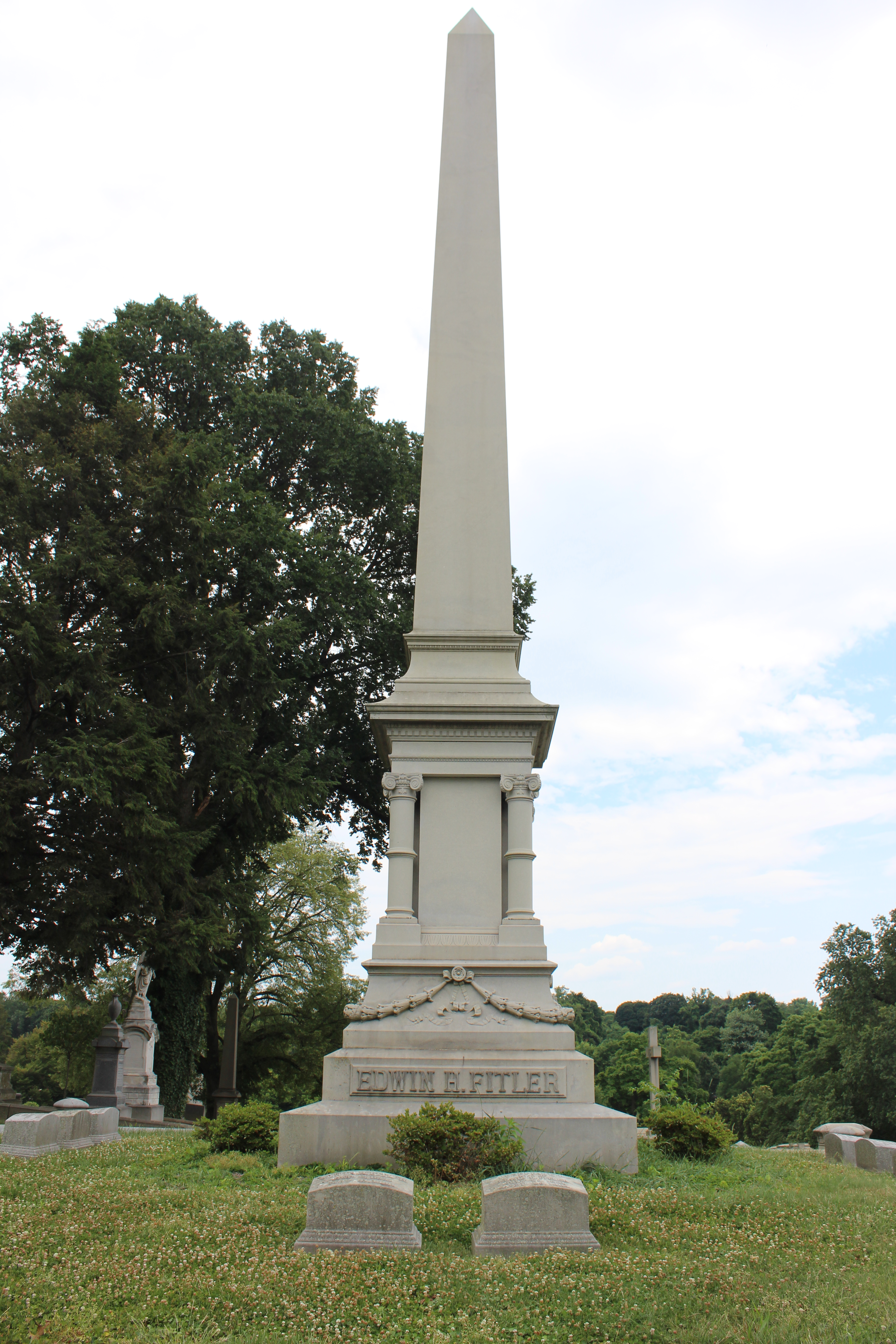
Edwin Henry Fitler memorial in Laurel Hill Cemetery

Fitler died on May 31, 1896, at his estate in the Torresdale section of Philadelphia. His net worth was estimated to be $3 million. He was buried at Laurel Hill Cemetery.

Fitler Square, an elementary school in Philadelphia and Fitler Street, in Philadelphia's Torresdale neighborhood, are named in his honor.

A residence hall in The Quadrangle's Fisher Hassenfeld College House at the University of Pennsylvania bears his name.

He is the great-grandfather of Happy Rockefeller, second wife of Vice President Nelson Rockefeller.

Political offices
Preceded by William Burns Smith	Mayor of Philadelphia; 1887–1891	Succeeded by Edwin Sydney Stuart
