= 1871 Philadelphia mayoral election =

- October 10, 1871
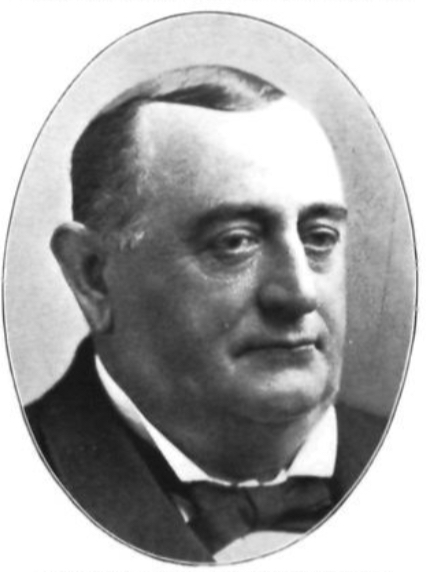

Nominee	William S. Stokley	James S. Biddle
Party	Republican	Democratic
Popular vote	58,508	50,307
Percentage	53.77%	46.23%
Mayor before election
Daniel M. Fox
Democratic
Elected mayor
William S. Stokley
Republican

The 1871 Philadelphia mayoral election saw the election of William S. Stokley.

== Results ==
1871 Philadelphia mayoral election
Party	Candidate	Votes	%
Republican	William S. Stokley	58,508	53.77%
Democratic	James S. Biddle	50,307	46.23%
Turnout		108,815	
