= Alexander McClure =

American politician

Alexander Kelly McClure
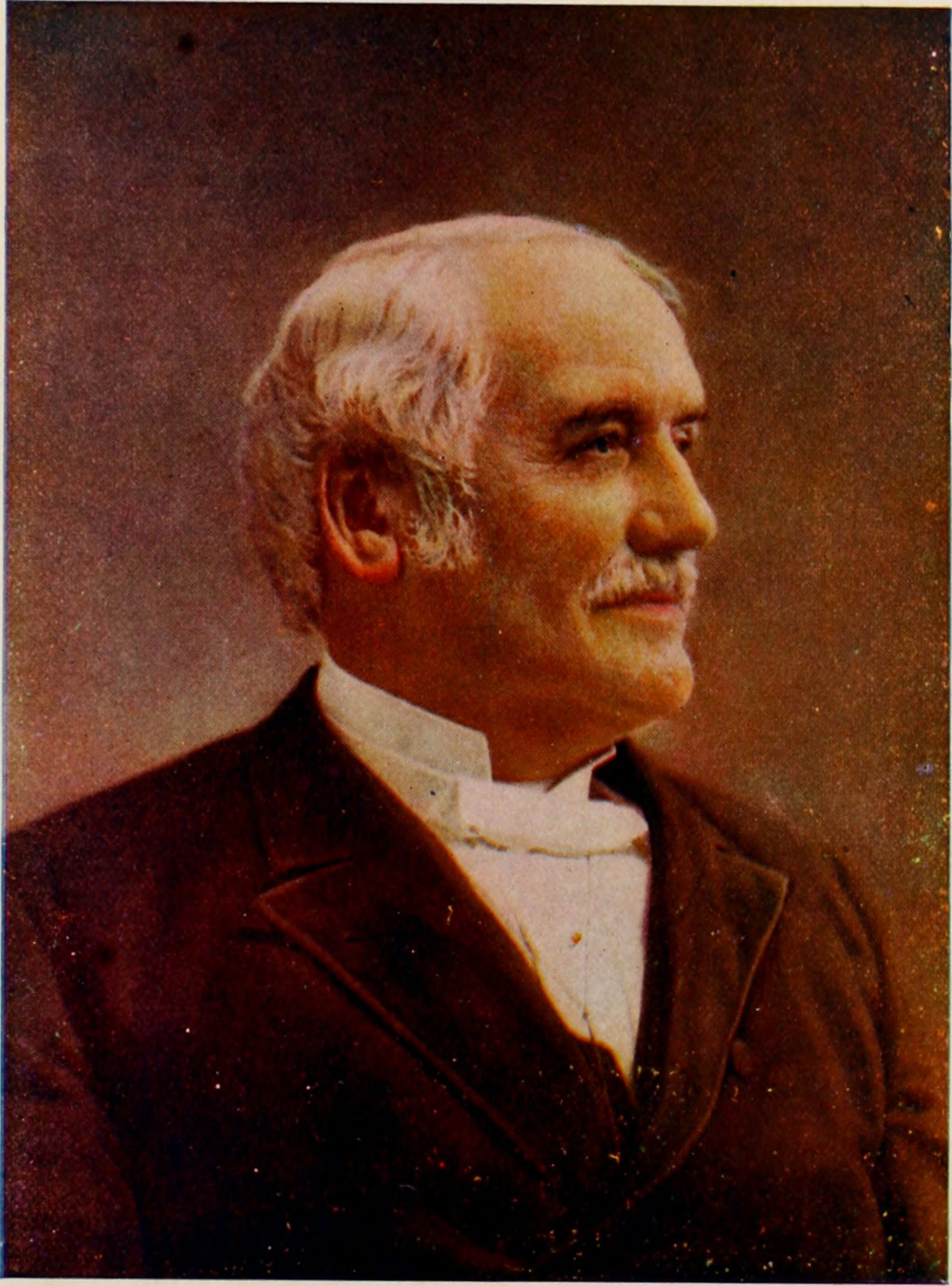

Member of the Pennsylvania House of Representatives
- In office 1858–1859, 1865-1866

Member of the Pennsylvania Senate for the 18th district
- In office 1861-1862
- Preceded by: George W. Brewer
- Succeeded by: William McSherry

Member of the Pennsylvania Senate for the 4th district
- In office 1873-1874
- Preceded by: Henry Wolf Gray
- Succeeded by: Horatio Gates Jones

Personal details
- Born: January 9, 1828 Sherman's Valley, Pennsylvania
- Died: June 6, 1909 (aged 81) Wallingford, Pennsylvania
- Resting place: Laurel Hill Cemetery, Philadelphia, Pennsylvania
- Party: Republican
- Other political affiliations: Whig (before 1856)

Alexander Kelly McClure (January 9, 1828 – June 6, 1909) was an American politician, newspaper editor, and writer from Pennsylvania. He served as a Republican member of the Pennsylvania House of Representatives from 1858 to 1859 and 1865 to 1866 as well as a member of the Pennsylvania State Senate for the 18th district in 1861 and the 4th district from 1873 to 1874. He was a prominent supporter, correspondent, and biographer of President Abraham Lincoln. He was the editor of the Franklin Repository newspaper in Chambersburg, Pennsylvania and of the Philadelphia Times. The borough of McClure, Pennsylvania, and the Alexander K. McClure School in Philadelphia, Pennsylvania, are named in his honor.

== Early life and education ==
McClure was born on January 9, 1828, in Sherman's Valley, Perry County, Pennsylvania, to Alexander and Isabella Anderson McClure. He grew up on a farm and received little formal education. At the age of fourteen, he moved to Philadelphia, Pennsylvania and apprenticed as a tanner. He traveled west as far as Iowa but returned to Pennsylvania after failing in the tannery business. He worked as a printer at the Perry County Freeman and the Juniata Sentinel in Mifflintown, Pennsylvania.

He became editor and publisher of the Sentinel in 1846, and became known for his Whig political views.

McClure was appointed to the staff of the first Whig governor of Pennsylvania, William F. Johnston, with the honorary rank of colonel. In 1850, Millard Fillmore appointed McClure deputy United States Marshal for Juniata County. He moved to Chambersburg in 1852 and purchased the Franklin Repository newspaper.

He studied law and was admitted to the Franklin County, Pennsylvania, bar in 1856.

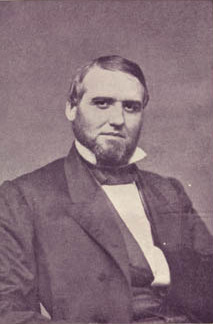
McClure in 1860

== Career ==
McClure became active in the newly formed Republican Party and was an outspoken abolitionist. In 1857, he was elected to the Pennsylvania House of Representatives and re-elected in 1858 and 1859.

At the 1860 Republican National Convention McClure became a well-known political figure, opposing fellow Pennsylvanian Simon Cameron's bid for the Republican nomination for the presidency. McClure and Andrew G. Curtin helped swing the state's vote away from Cameron and William Seward to Abraham Lincoln. After Lincoln's election, McClure became chairman of the Republican state committee and helped to elect Curtin governor of Pennsylvania.

He served in the Pennsylvania Senate for the 18th district in 1861 and for the 4th district in 1873.

When the Civil War began, McClure rallied support for the war as Chairman of the Senate Committee of Military Affairs. He assisted Governor Curtin in planning a meeting of fourteen Northern state governors known as the "Loyal War Governors of the North", in Altoona, Pennsylvania, in order to secure their continued support of the war. McClure was commissioned by President Lincoln as an assistant adjutant general with the rank of major on September 6, 1862. He was tasked with raising seventeen Pennsylvania regiments for induction into the U.S. Army and served until he resigned his commission on February 27, 1863.

During the U.S. Civil War, Confederate forces threatened McClure's home in Chambersburg several times. McClure was captured but released when General J.E.B. Stuart entered Chambersburg on his raid around McClellan's army in October 1862. The following July, Confederates under then Colonel Eppa Hunton crossed the Potomac River and destroyed railroad property in Chambersburg en route to the Battle of Gettysburg, but noted McClure's hospitality. Days before the battle of Gettysburg, Confederate General Albert Jenkins was a guest at McClure's house. McClure personally met with Robert E. Lee during the second occupancy of Chambersburg by the Confederate army.

In 1864, during the Confederacy's third occupation of Chambersburg, when the town was unable to pay ransom demanded by General Jubal Early, Confederates burned McClure's home, Norland along with much of the rest of the town, The home was rebuilt and sold to Wilson College. The building that housed the Franklin Repository newspaper operations was also destroyed in the blaze.

In 1864, McClure moved to Philadelphia, opened a law office and helped Lincoln carry Pennsylvania again in the general election.

In 1865, McClure was elected again to the Pennsylvania House of Representatives as a Union Party member.

After the war, McClure traveled extensively in the Western United States to recoup personal wealth lost during the war. He became an investor and officer of the Philadelphia-based Montana Gold and Silver Mining Company and was superintendent of one of the company's mills at the Oro Cache vein in the Montana Territory. He also collaborated with former Pennsylvania Governor Andrew Curtin as an incorporator of the McClure-Curtin Oil Company in Venango County, Pennsylvania.

He returned to Philadelphia in 1868 after supporting Ulysses S. Grant at the Republican National Convention. By the time of Grant's reelection bid, McClure had left the Republican Party and threw his support to Horace Greeley and the Liberal Republican Party.

In 1867, McClure published Three Thousand Miles Through the Rocky Mountains and it became a resource by many interested in traveling in the West.

In 1873, McClure was elected to the Pennsylvania Senate for the 4th district. In 1874, he ran for mayor of Philadelphia but lost by only 900 votes.

McClure returned to newspaper editing by founding the Philadelphia Times in 1875. He continued as The Philadelphia Times' editor until 1901, when he sold the newspaper to Adolph Ochs.

He lost much of his fortune in the stock market but was able to obtain an appointment as prothonotary of the Supreme Court of Pennsylvania.

He also worked to heal sectional divisions between Union and former Confederate forces, including participating at the unveiling of the monument to Confederate General George Pickett at the Hollywood Cemetery in Richmond, Virginia. In 1886 McClure wrote The South: Its Industrial, Financial, and Political Condition, which included material on race relations in the South. McClure recognized that integration was necessary.

== Personal life ==
McClure married Cora M. Gratz in 1879 after his first wife's apparent death. Together they had at least one son.

== Death and legacy ==
McClure died on June 6, 1909, in Wallingford, Pennsylvania and was buried at Laurel Hill Cemetery in Philadelphia.

The town of McClure, Pennsylvania, and the Alexander K. McClure School in Philadelphia are named in his honor.

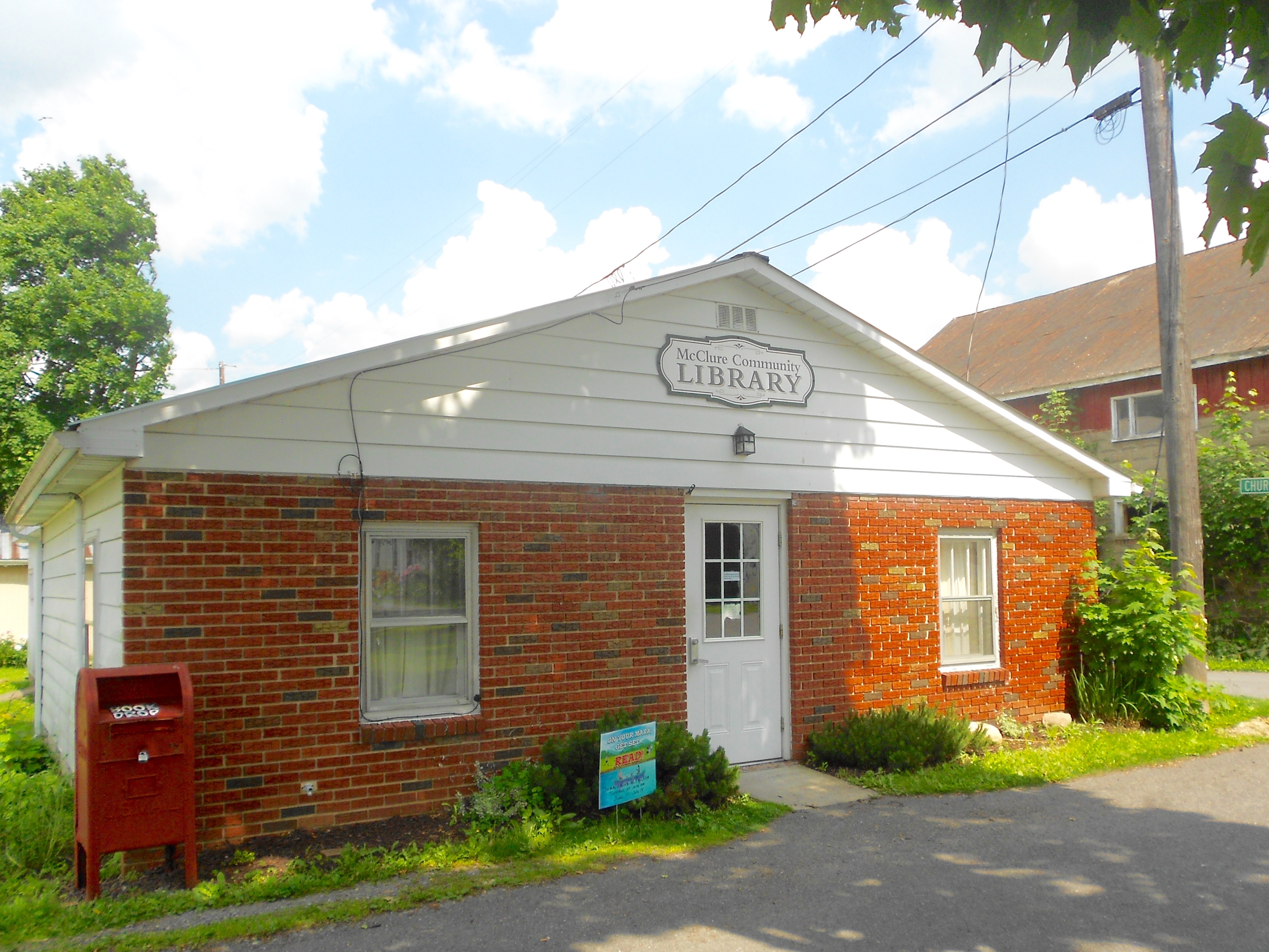
Library in McClure, Pennsylvania

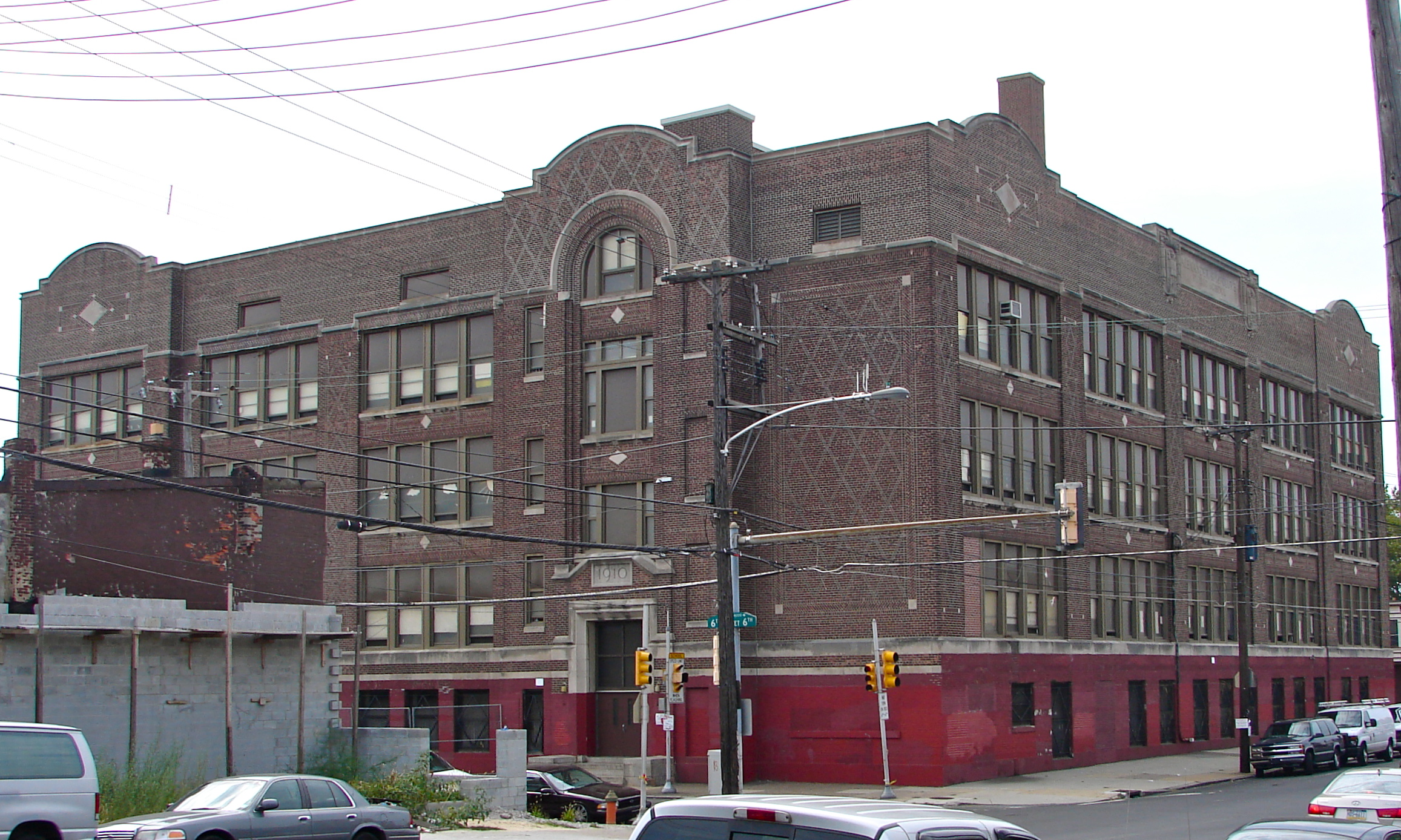
McClure School Philadelphia

== Published works ==
- Three Thousand Miles Through the Rocky Mountains. Philadelphia: J.B. Lippincott & Co, 1869.
- The Annals of the Civil War. 1878. New York: Da Capo Press, 1994.
- The South: Its Industrial, Financial, and Political Condition. Philadelphia: J.B. Lippincott & Co., 1886.
- Abraham Lincoln and Men of War Times: Some Personal Recollections of War and Politics during the Lincoln Administration. Philadelphia, The Times Publishing Company 1892
- The Life and Services of Andrew G. Curtin. Harrisburg: Clarence M. Busch, 1895.
- Addresses, Literary, Political, Legal & Miscellaneous, Volume 2. Philadelphia: The Times Publishing Company, 1895.
- Lincoln's Yarns and Stories: A Complete Collection of the Funny and Witty Anecdotes That Made Abraham Lincoln Famous as America's Greatest Story Teller. Philadelphia: The J.C. Winston Company, 1900.
- The Authentic Life of William McKinley Our Third Martyr President: Together with a Life Sketch of Theodore Roosevelt. Washington, DC: W.E. Scull, 1901.
- To the Pacific & Mexico. Philadelphia: J.B. Lippincott Company, 1901.
- Famous American Statesmen & Orators, Past and Present: With Biographical Sketches and Their Famous Orations. New York: F.F. Lovell, 1902.
- Our Presidents and How We Make Them. New York: Harper, 1902.
- Colonel Alexander K. McClure's Recollections of Half a Century, The Salem Press Company, 1902. His recollections regarding the Harpers Ferry raid appeared first in a newspaper.
- Old Time Notes of Pennsylvania. Philadelphia: The John C. Winston Company, 1905.
