= The Times (Philadelphia) =

American former newspaper

- Type: Daily newspaper
- Founder(s): Alexander McClure and Frank McLaughlin
- Fate: merged into Public Ledger by Adolph Ochs
- Founded: 1875
- Ceased publication: 1902
- Headquarters: Philadelphia, Pennsylvania, U.S.
- OCLC number: 10288632

The Times was a daily newspaper published from March 13, 1875, to August 11, 1902, in Philadelphia, Pennsylvania.

The paper was founded by Alexander McClure and Frank McLaughlin as an independent voice against party machine politics and corruption. Despite this, by the mid-1890s it had become aligned with the city's ruling Republican Party machine. The Times, along with Philadelphia papers such as the Public Ledger, the Press, and the Evening Telegraph catered to a middle-class readership, and by 1880, it had the third-largest circulation in the city, with 32,500 copies sold daily. Though the Public Ledger maintained its circulation lead through the end of the 19th century, the Times effectively competed with its older rival, and in 1900 both papers claimed a daily circulation of about 70,000 copies.

Adolph Ochs became proprietor and editor of the Times in 1901. The following year, he purchased the Philadelphia Public Ledger and merged the Times into his new acquisition.

== Notable people ==
- Mary Temple Bayard (1853–1916), American writer, journalist
