= William Burns Smith =

American politician

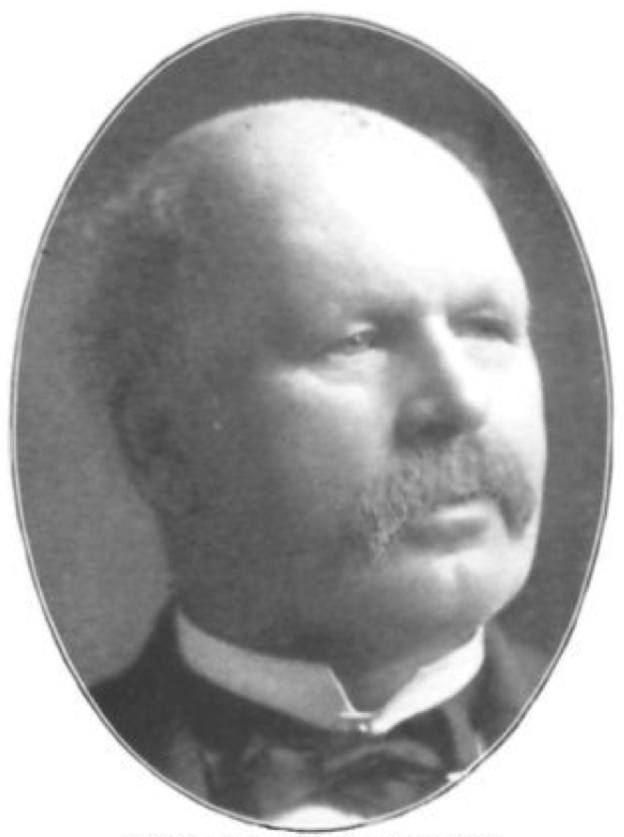

74th Mayor of Philadelphia, Pennsylvania
- In office 1884–1887
- Preceded by: Samuel G. King
- Succeeded by: Edwin Henry Fitler

Personal details
- Born: November 11, 1844; Glasgow, Scotland
- Died: November 23, 1917 (aged 73); Laurel Springs, New Jersey
- Political party: Republican

William Burns Smith (November 11, 1844 – November 23, 1917) was an American politician. He was the 74th Mayor of Philadelphia, serving from 1884 to 1887. He was a member of the Republican Party.

== Life ==
Smith was born in Glasgow on November 11, 1844, to William Wallace Smith and Anne Simpson. He and his parents moved to Philadelphia when William was 7. At age 11 he became a wood-carver's apprentice. At age 25, he joined the Pennsylvania National Guard and became major of the Veteran Corps 14 years later. He was part of the force that put down the Great Railroad Strike of 1877 in Pittsburgh.

In 1881, he won a seat on the Select Council representing Philadelphia's 28th Ward after the resignation of Councilman George A. Smith. A year later, despite losing the primary election, he won re-election to the council on the Democratic Party line and became president of that body. The Republican Party, which sought to win back the mayor's office from the Democrats, nominated Smith to run against Samuel G. King. Smith won the election with 79,552 votes to King's 70,440 and took office on April 7, 1884.

He specifically addressed reforms to the police department at his inauguration and made efforts to reform the city police force. During his term, however, Smith faced an inquiry from the city controller regarding the whereabouts of $8,000 in fees that his office collected. The mayor did provide receipts to the controller, who remained suspicious and requested an audit of the records. The audit suggested that the financial records did not appear to be originals and the mayor failed to provide deposit and checkbooks. This led to the filing of articles of impeachment against the mayor in 1886.

Smith died on November 23, 1917, at his home in Laurel Springs, New Jersey and is interred at Mount Moriah Cemetery in Philadelphia, Pennsylvania.

Political offices
| Preceded by Samuel G. King | Mayor of Philadelphia; 1884–1887 | Succeeded by Edwin Henry Fitler |
