= Rudolph Blankenburg =

American politician (1843–1918)

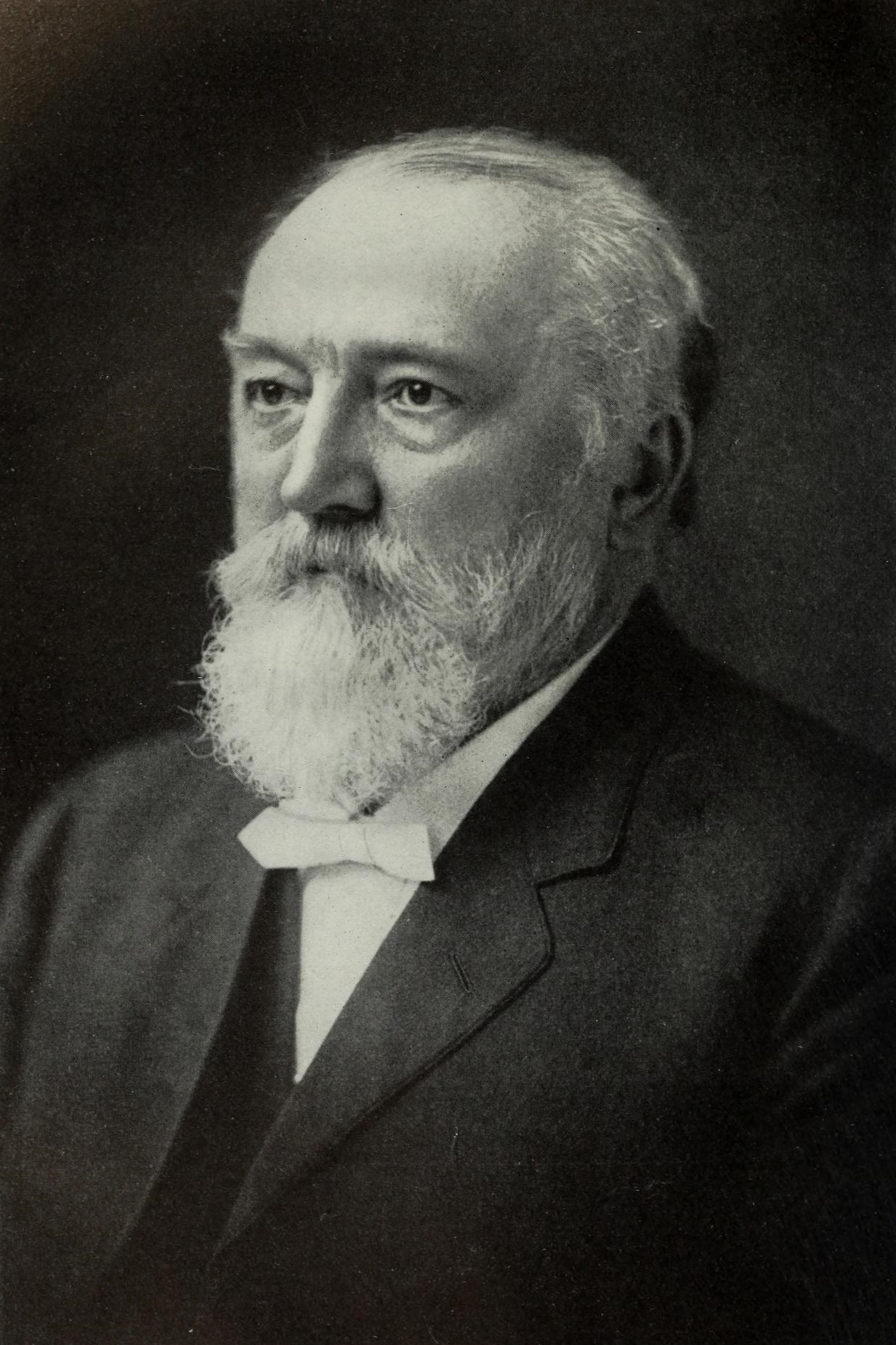

81st Mayor of Philadelphia, Pennsylvania
- In office December 4, 1911 – January 3, 1916
- Preceded by: John E. Reyburn
- Succeeded by: Thomas B. Smith

Personal details
- Born: February 16, 1843 Barntrup, Principality of Lippe
- Died: April 12, 1918 (aged 75) Germantown, Pennsylvania, U.S.
- Party: Keystone-Democratic
- Spouse: Lucretia Longshore (m. 1867)
- Occupation: Manufacturer
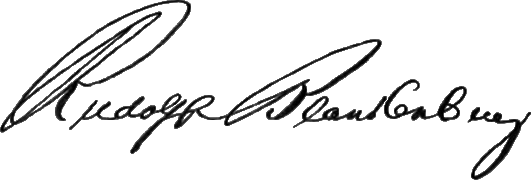
- Signature

Rudolph Blankenburg (February 16, 1843 – April 12, 1918) was an American businessman and manufacturer, who became a politician. He was elected mayor of Philadelphia, leading a reform administration from 1911 to 1916. He wrote commentaries on political corruption.

== Early life and education ==
Blankenburg was born in Barntrup, Principality of Lippe. From age 7 to 14, he was tutored by Carl Becker, a graduate of the Free University of Berlin. He showed an aptitude for languages, and became proficient in English and French, in addition to his native German. At the age of fourteen he left home to spend three years studying at the Real Gymnasium at Lippstadt.

== Career ==
In 1865, Blankenburg followed Becker to the United States. He began working as a salesman and then became a textile manufacturer. He also began associating with the Society of Friends.

After becoming wealthy he retired from his business concerns in 1909. Blankenburg became a naturalized U.S. citizen.

On April 18, 1867, Blankenburg married Lucretia Longshore (May 8, 1845 – March 29, 1937), a Quaker suffragist, social activist, civic reformer, and writer. Longshore was the daughter of pioneering physician Hannah E. Longshore, who died on October 19, 1901, at the Blankenburgs' home at 214 Logan Square. The street on which that address was located, West Logan Square, ceased to exist when Logan Square was extended westward in the creation of the Benjamin Franklin Parkway.

He began taking an interest in civic improvement and reform politics in Philadelphia in 1877. He was elected county commissioner for Philadelphia in 1905, serving from 1906 to 1909. He was then elected mayor of Philadelphia in 1911 on the Keystone-Democratic ticket; the coalition was organized to fight Republican corruption in the state and city. He served as mayor from December 1911 to January 1916.

Because of his commitment to progressive reform, he was known as "The Old War Horse of Reform" and "The Old Dutch Cleanser" (a play on a cleaning product brand). He ended assessments by ward leaders of policemen, reorganized the civil service system to have it based on merit, gained passage by the legislature of a bill to enable the city to lease development of subway and transit lines, and worked for reform for 40 years as a political activist.

In earlier years, he was a worldwide traveler. He also became known by his numerous magazine and newspaper articles on social, economic and religious questions.

== Death ==
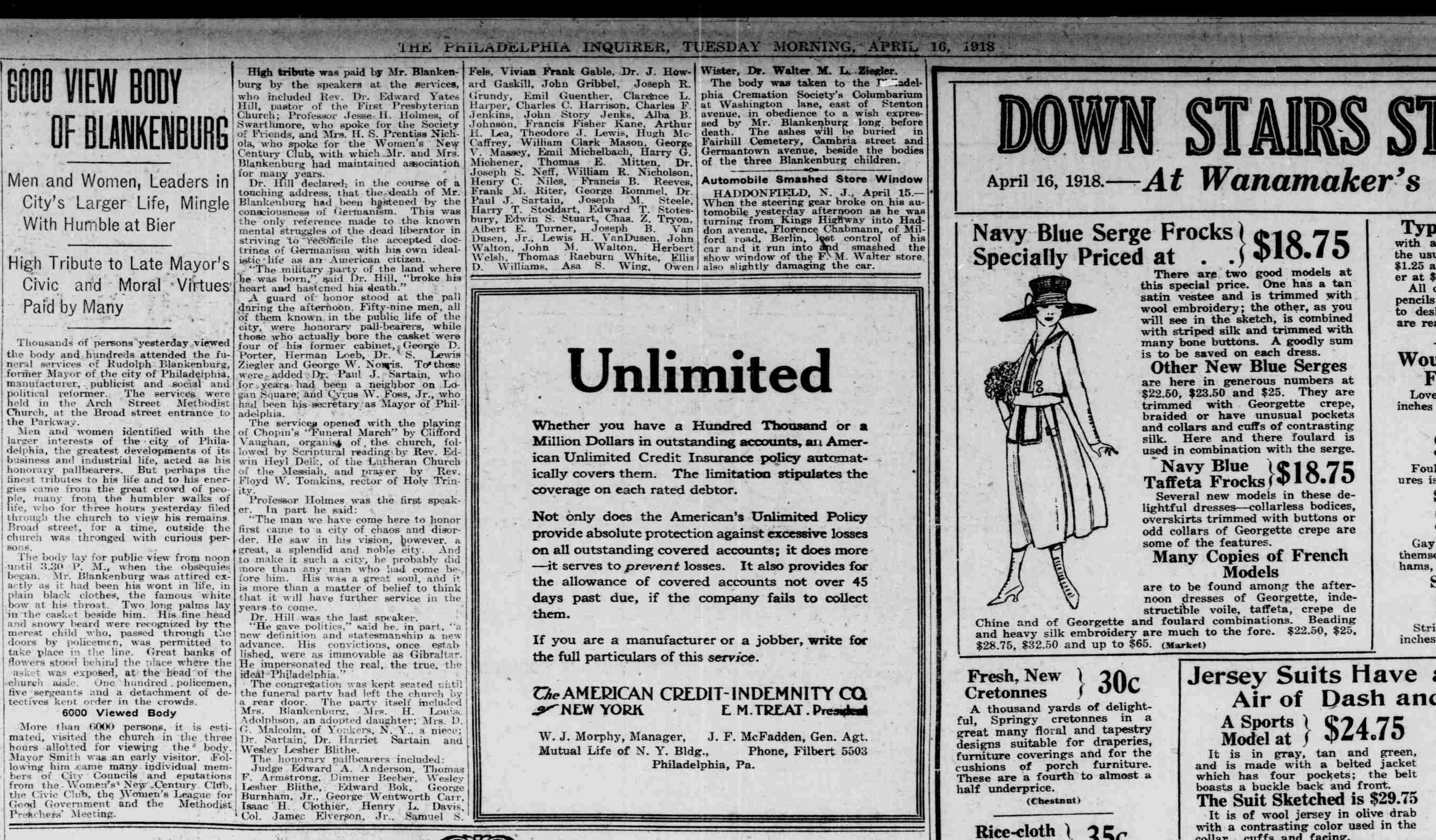
Coverage of Blankenburg's funeral in The Philadelphia Inquirer

Blankenburg died in the Germantown section of Philadelphia. In accordance with his wishes, his body was cremated and his ashes buried at Fair Hill Burial Ground alongside the bodies of his three children.

== Legacy ==
More than 6,000 people viewed Blankenburg's body and attended his funeral, held at the Arch Street Methodist Church.

In 1921, the City of Philadelphia contracted with the John W. Sullivan Company of New York for the construction of a 129-foot, steam-powered, all-steel fireboat to be named the Rudolph Blankenburg. The boat was launched in Elizabeth, New Jersey on August 10 of that year, sponsored by Blankenburg's widow, Lucretia, who broke a bottle of champagne across its bow. The fireboat remained in service until 1950. That year, the Blankenburg and its running mate, the J. Hampton Moore (which was named after another mayor of Philadelphia), were replaced by a pair of diesel-powered fireboats, the Franklin and the Delaware.

The Rudolph Blankenburg Elementary School in the Mill Creek section of Philadelphia was built in the 1920s and named in his honor.

Political offices
Preceded by John E. Reyburn	Mayor of Philadelphia; 1911–1916	Succeeded by Thomas B. Smith
