= Longshore =

Longshore may refer to:

== People ==
- Ashley Longshore, American painter and entrepreneur
- Dick Longshore (1926–1988), American Navy veteran and politician
- Hannah Longshore (1819–1901), American physician
- Lucretia Longshore Blankenburg (1845–1937), American suffragist and writer
- Nate Longshore (born 1986), American Football player
- William H. Longshore (1841–1909), Civil War Medal of Honor Recipient
- Anna M. Longshore Potts (1829–1912), American physician

== Other uses ==
- Longshore Sailing School
- Longshore drift
- Longshoreman
