= Long Island Sound =

Tidal estuary on the U.S. East Coast

Coordinates: 41°05′48″N 72°52′52″W

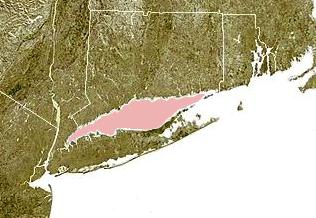
Long Island Sound, highlighted in pink between Connecticut (to the north) and Long Island (to the south)

Long Island Sound is a marine sound and tidal estuary of the Atlantic Ocean. It lies predominantly between the U.S. state of Connecticut to the north and Long Island in New York state to the south. From west to east, the sound stretches 110 mi (180 km) from the East River and the Throgs Neck Bridge in New York City, along the North Shore of Long Island, to Block Island Sound. The sound forms part of the Intracoastal Waterway.

A mix of freshwater from tributaries, and saltwater from the Atlantic Ocean, Long Island Sound is 21 miles (34 km) at its widest point and varies in depth from 65 to 230 feet (20 to 70 m).

== Shoreline cities ==
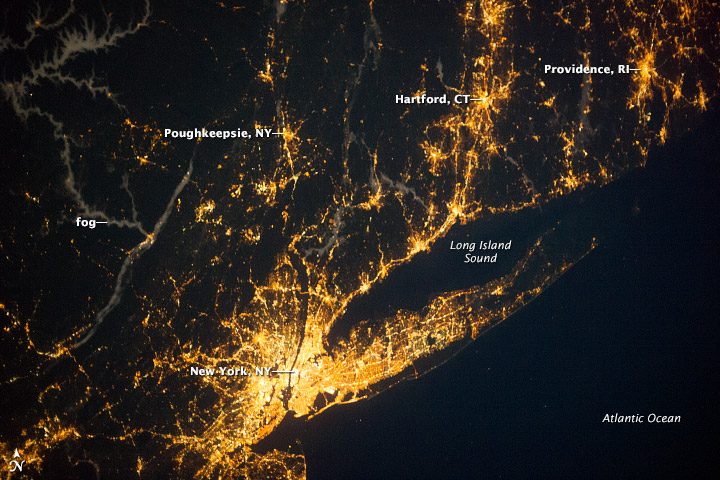
Long Island Sound at night as seen from space

Major Connecticut cities on the sound include Stamford, Norwalk, Bridgeport, New Haven, and New London. Cities and towns on the New York side of the sound include Rye, Glen Cove, New Rochelle, North Hempstead, Oyster Bay, Smithtown, Port Jefferson, Brookhaven and Riverhead, Larchmont, Mamaroneck and portions of Queens and the Bronx in New York City.

== Climate and geography ==
The climate of Long Island Sound is warm temperate or Cfa in the Köppen climate classification. Summers are hot and humid often with convective showers and strong sunshine, while the cooler months feature cold temperatures and a mix of rain and occasional snow.

=== Glacial history ===
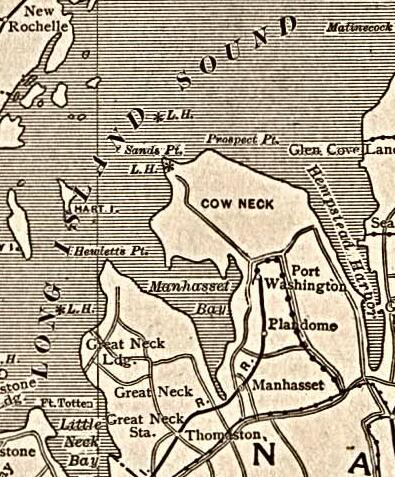
Manhasset Bay, as seen on a map from 1917

About 18,000 years ago, Connecticut, Long Island Sound, and much of Long Island were covered by a thick sheet of ice, part of the Late Wisconsin Glacier. About 3,300 feet (1,000 m) thick in its interior and about 1,300 to 1,600 feet (400 to 500 m) thick along its southern edge, it was the most recent of a series of glaciations that covered the area during the past 10 million years. Sea level at that time was about 330 feet (100 m) lower than today.

The continental ice sheet scraped off an average of 65 feet (20 m) of surface material from the New England landscape, then deposited the material (known as drift) from the Connecticut coast into the sound, creating what is now Long Island (the terminal moraine). When the ice sheet stopped advancing 18,000 years ago (as addition of snow at the origin was in equilibrium with the melting at the southern edge), a large amount of drift was deposited, known as the Ronkonkoma Moraine, which stretches along much of southern Long Island. Later, another period of equilibrium resulted in the Harbor Hill Moraine along most of northern Long Island. The next moraines (recessional moraines) to the north were created just on and off the Connecticut coast. These moraines, created by much smaller deposits (probably from equilibrium states that were much shorter in time) are discontinuous and much smaller than those to the south. The Connecticut coast moraines are in two groups: the Norwalk area and the Madison-Old Saybrook area. Sandy plains and beaches resulted from the erosion of moraines and redeposition in these areas, and to the east of each, where the drift cover is thinnest, exposed bedrock, creating rocky headlands, often with marshlands behind them.

The Captain Islands off Greenwich, Connecticut, along with the Norwalk Islands and Falkner Island off Guilford, Connecticut, are parts of a recessional moraine. Other islands, including the Thimble Islands, are for the most part exposed bedrock with a thin amount of drift, often not continuous. Other shoals and islands off the Connecticut coast are a mixture of these two extremes. The glacier also created several sandy outwash deltas off the coast, including one off Bridgeport, Connecticut, and another off New Haven, Connecticut. Fishers Island, New York, appears to be related to the Harbor Hill Moraine. To the east of the Thimble Islands, inland moraines along the Connecticut coast include the broken Madison Moraine and the Old Saybrook Moraine.

The Long Island Sound basin existed before the glaciers came. It probably had been formed by stream flows. A relatively thick cover of sand and gravel (termed outwash) was left in the basin from glacial meltwater streams. On the west, a ridge rising to about 65 feet (20 m) below the present sea level is called the Mattatuck Sill. Its lowest point is about 80 feet (24 m) below sea level. Glacial meltwater formed "Lake Connecticut", a freshwater lake in the basin, until about 8,000 years ago, when the sea level rose to about 80 feet (24 m) below today's level. Seawater then overflowed into the basin, transforming it from a nontidal, freshwater lake to a tidal, saline arm of the sea.

=== Rivers ===
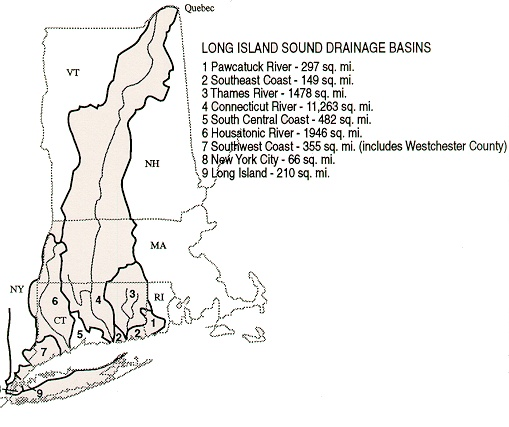
The Watershed of Long Island Sound stretches as far as Quebec, and includes nearly all of Connecticut and Western Massachusetts, large swathes of Vermont, New Hampshire, and Rhode Island along with relatively small areas of New York state. (The map is miscolored in two places: the area labeled "5" is part of the watershed; and the area labeled "9" (encompassing all of Long Island as the southerly limit of the watershed) should only indicate land along the Island's northern coast that drains into the sound)

Numerous rivers empty into the sound, including:

Connecticut

- Connecticut River - Old Saybrook
- Housatonic River - Stratford & Milford
- Mianus River - Greenwich
- Mill River (Quinnipiac River) - New Haven
- Mill River (Fairfield) - Fairfield
- Norwalk River - Norwalk
- Pequonnock River - Bridgeport
- Quinnipiac River - New Haven
- Rooster River/Ash Creek - Bridgeport & Fairfield
- Rippowam River - Stamford
- Saugatuck River - Westport
- Thames River (Connecticut) - Groton & New London
- West River (Connecticut) - West Haven

New York

- Byram River - Port Chester
- Hutchinson River-The Bronx
- Mamaroneck River - Mamaroneck
- Nissequogue River - Nissequogue & Ft Salonga

Rhode Island

- Pawcatuck River

=== Watershed demographics ===
Historical population
| Census | Pop. | Note | %± |
|---|---|---|---|
| 1800 | 567,470 | | — |
| 1850 | 1,000,660 | | — |
| 1900 | 2,442,150 | | — |
| 1950 | 6,021,880 | | — |
| 1970 | 8,037,310 | | — |
| 1980 | 7,799,300 | | −3.0% |
| 2000 | 8,626,920 | | — |
| 2010 | 8,934,094 | | 3.6% |
Long Island Watershed Population (data taken from US Census)

The whole watershed population is about 8.93 million as of the 2010 census. Due to extent of the Connecticut River, many riverside cities and towns are included in the Long Island Sound watershed. The largest towns and cities from south to north, west to east are:

==== New York ====
- Huntington
- Oyster Bay
- Smithtown
- Parts of these New York City boroughs:
  - The Bronx
  - Queens
  - Brooklyn
- Port Chester
- Rye (city), New York

==== Connecticut ====
- Stamford
- Bridgeport
- New Haven
- New London
- Danbury
- Waterbury
- Norwich
- Willimantic
- Torrington
- Hartford

==== Rhode Island ====
- Westerly

==== Massachusetts ====
- Springfield
- Worcester
- Pittsfield

==== Vermont ====
- Brattleboro
- White River Jct.

==== New Hampshire ====
- Keene
- West Lebanon

== Fauna and flora ==
=== Flora ===
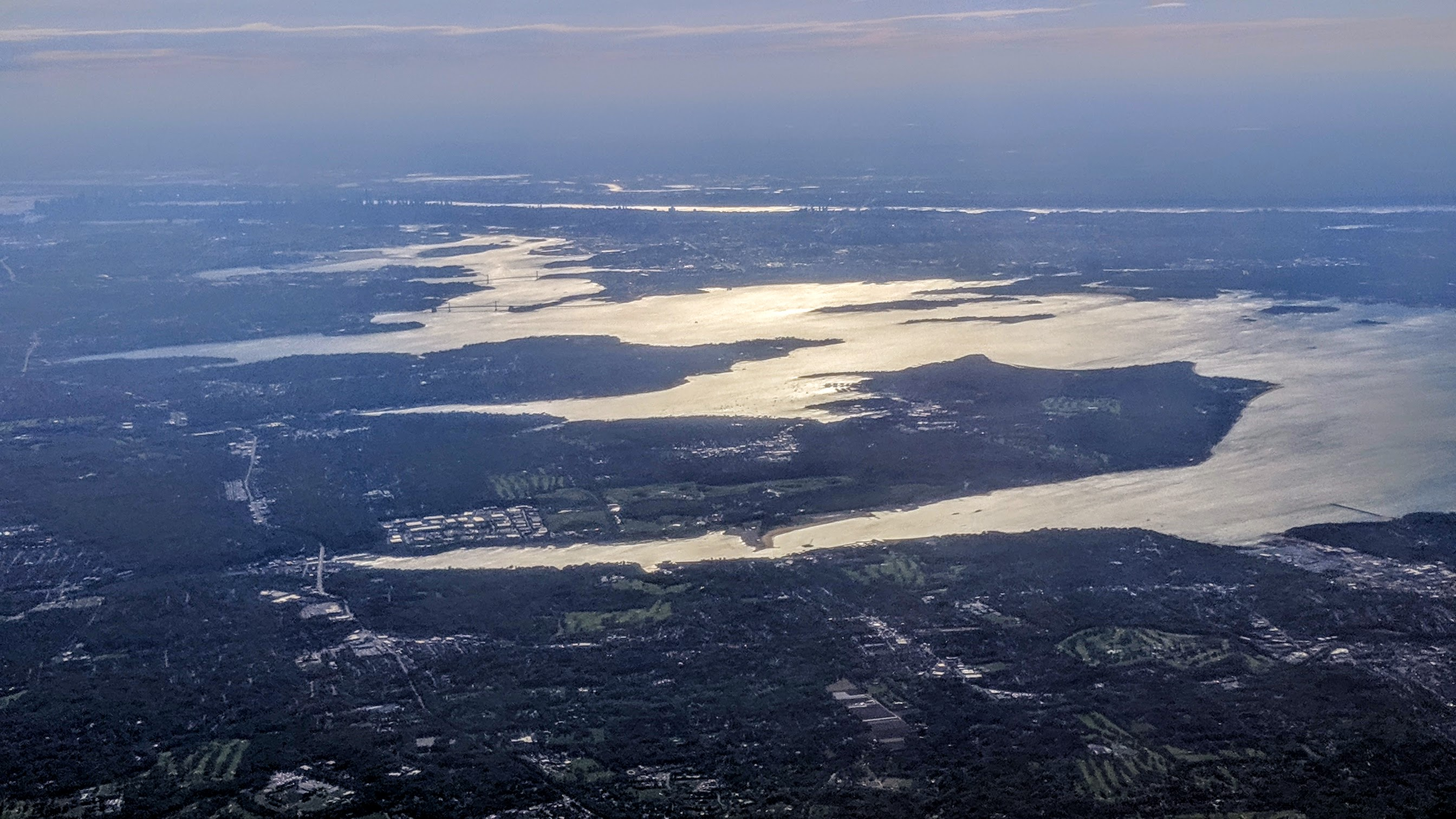
An aerial photo of the North Shore of Nassau County on Long Island, looking west. The Cow Neck Peninsula is visible in the center, with Manhasset Bay immediately above it and Hempstead Harbor immediately below it.

==== Seaweed ====
Seaweeds in the sound occur in greatest abundance in rocky areas between high tide and low tide as well as on rocks on the sea floor. Green seaweed populations fluctuate with the seasons. Monostroma, reproduces in the early spring and dies out by late summer. Grinnellia appears in August and disappears four to six weeks later.

In the rocky areas of the intertidal zone there are the seaweeds characterized by their brown tone, Fucus and Ascophyllum, some species of which have air bladders that allow them to float and receive direct sunlight even at high tide. Also present are Ectocarpus and red algae Polysiphonia, Neosiphonia, Porphyra and Chondrus (Irish moss).

In the marshy areas of the intertidal zone can be found Cladophora (mermaid's hair), Ulva (sea lettuce) and Codium.

In the subtidal zone (below low tide) are Palmaria palmata a red alga, along with two algae, Laminaria (kelp) and Chorda. Kelp can often be found washed up on the beach, and individual specimens are not uncommonly a yard or two long. Deeper in the subtidal zone are red algae such as Spermothamnion, Antithamnion and Callithamnion, which also often float freely.

In tidal pools can be found red or pink colored Phymatolithon, which can often encrust rocks and mollusk shells. Also present are green algae, including Ulothrix, Cladophora, and Ulva.

==== Plants found in tidal marshes ====
Tidal marshes are some of the most productive biological systems in the world. Along the sound, they produce three to seven tons per acre per year of vegetation, largely in the form of salt marsh grasses. Much of this, enriched by decomposition, is flushed yearly into the estuary water where it directly contributes to the great finfish and shellfish production of the sound.

Salt marsh plants

Salt marshes host salt water cordgrass (Spartina alterniflora) along ditches and on the seaside edges of marshes where high tides daily inundate it. Salt meadow cordgrass (Spartina patens) and spikegrass (Distichlis spicata) grow in areas less frequently inundated by saltwater, typically closer to dry land. A short form of salt water cordgrass can sometimes be found in the depressions (pannes) in the higher areas where salt water collects and evaporates, leaving water even higher in salinity than seawater.

Other plants in the pannes are sea lavender, salt marsh aster, seaside gerardia, and some species of glasswort. Plants found near the border of the marsh with the upland include bayberry and groundsel-tree shrubs, switchgrass (growing where occasional storm tides reach), reeds and marsh elder.

Cattail marshes

cattail marshes replace salt marshes in areas where the sound's salt water is more diluted with freshwater from rivers, including along the shores of the larger river estuaries such as the Connecticut River. Various types of grasses, including wild rice, and sedges, including bulrushes, are found here.

Eelgrass meadows

Eelgrass - sometimes known as "Saltwater Eelgrass" in order to distinguish it from Freshwater Eelgrass, which is a different species (Vallisneria americana) - is typically found in protected bays, coves, and other areas of brackish water, but it also persists along areas of exposed shoreline along Long Island's north shore near Orient. Eelgrass is one of the few vascular plants found in the marine environment. Despite its name, it is actually not a species of underwater grass; instead, it is a plant that bears a physical resemblance to grass. It can tolerate a wide range of water salinity. It grows on muddy to sandy sediments (even among rocks), mostly below low tide, often forming large meadows. it grows best in shallow water because it is dependent upon sunlight, and the water of the Long island Sound can be very murky. Eelgrass roots help stabilize muddy sediments and can trap moving sand, helping prevent erosion. The leaves, which can range in size from less than 1 m to 2 m long, slow currents, providing calm environments for many species of mollusks and other invertebrates. Eelgrass is also an important food source for waterfowl, especially brant, a type of goose. During the 1930s, the Long Island Sound was struck by an outbreak of a mold infection known as "eelgrass wasting disease". As a result, most of the eelgrass that grew in the sound was killed off, and as an extension, populations of wildlife in the area that depended upon the eelgrass either as food or as a habitat went into a sharp decline. During the succeeding decades, areas along the Connecticut coast saw a slow gradual recovery of eelgrass populations. Unfortunately, the north shore of Long Island did not see much success, and efforts have been made to re-introduce eelgrass by planting it, especially in the eastern part of the Long Island Sound in the waters of Suffolk County. It is unlikely that the Long Island Sound will experience a complete recovery of its eelgrass population because there are still occasional outbreaks of eelgrass wasting disease within the sound.

==== Plants found on beaches and dunes ====
Few undisturbed beach and dune systems exist on the Connecticut shore, the ones that do are located along the eastern portion of the coastline (east of the Connecticut River). Sea rocket and dune grass occur here, but not in abundance. Dune grass and plants that thrive on dunes are largely responsible for the creation and growth of the dunes. On the seaward side of dunes can be found Lathyrus japonicus (beach pea), Dusty Miller, and seaside goldenrod. Other beach plants are orache, beach clotbur, seaside spurge, and jimson weed. On the more protected landward side of dunes are beach plum, bayberry and beach rose. Rare species found on the landward side are beach knotweed and sand false heather.

==== Upland vegetation ====
In areas next to the shoreline but hardly ever salty, the sound's environment can nevertheless be a crucial factor in the presence of certain species. Areas near the Connecticut shore are the northern limit for some species needing the warmer environment provided by proximity to the sound (which has a longer growing season than inland Connecticut and winters that are less harsh). These include sweetgum (only found in Connecticut in the extreme southwestern area of the state), the American holly, post oak and persimmon, which only exist in Connecticut along the shore. For many species which grow typically in sandy soils, the Connecticut shore is the northern limit.

Mature upland vegetation along the Connecticut coast is mostly hardwood forest, with dominant tree species including oaks and hickories, especially white oak, black oak, pignut hickory and mockernut hickory. Other trees include sassafras, black gum, and black cherry. Mature trees tend to be sparse in coastal forests, likely because of their greater exposure to the wind. This results in more sunlight reaching the forest floor, encouraging a jungle-like tangle of vines and shrubs, including the vines catbriar, poison ivy, bramble and bittersweet, and the shrubs blueberry, huckleberry, viburnum and hazelnut.

Along with the moderate climate, tropical cyclones can have an important impact on observable vegetation patterns. The greatest storms to hit the sound in the twentieth century were the 1938 hurricane, the 1955 hurricane, Hurricane Belle in 1976, Hurricane Gloria in 1985, Hurricane Irene in 2011, and Hurricane Sandy in 2012. After Hurricane Belle, leaves near the coast were badly salt-burned, then turned brown and shriveled. Many trees were downed by the storm, leaving openings in the forest cover, promoting the growth of vines and shrubs.

=== Fauna ===
==== Fish ====
The sound is inhabited by both marine fish and anadromous fish (oceanic or estuarine species that spawn in freshwater streams and rivers, see fish migration).

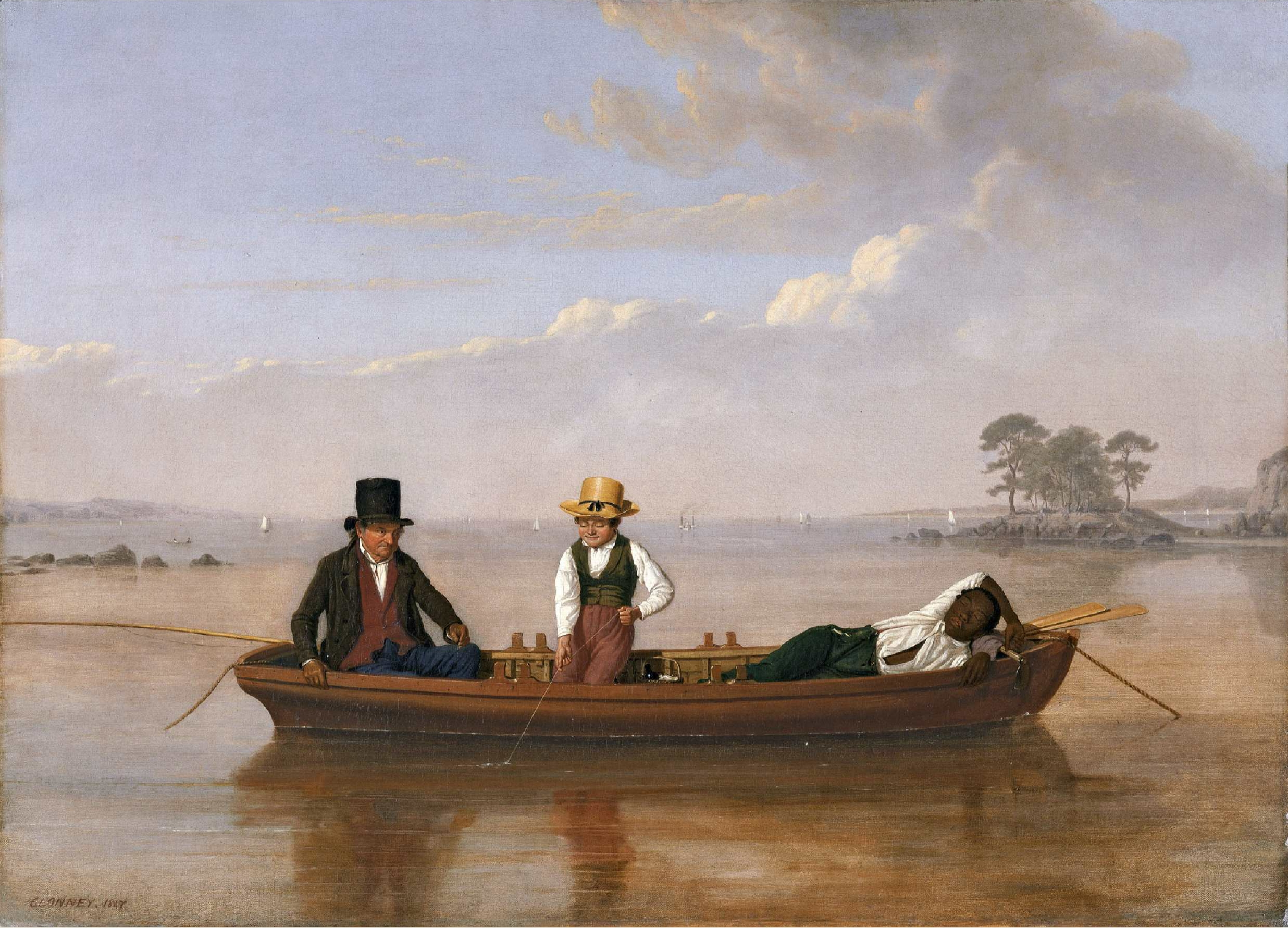
James Goodwyn Clonney, Fishing Party on Long Island Sound off New Rochelle, 1847

The most common marine fish in the sound include porgy, butterfish, winter flounder, summer flounder, windowpane flounder, fourspot flounder, northern and striped sea robin, little skate, menhaden, Atlantic silversides, black seabass, blackfish (tautog), cunner, bluefish, and smooth dogfish. Frequently Atlantic bonito and false albacore, both members of the tuna family, enter the sound and can be caught by anglers from small boats and shore. Many species have declined rapidly since 1975 due to over fishing. Winter flounder may not be currently present except for rare, small local populations. Tautog and summer flounder are also less numerous. Anadromous fishes include striped bass, white perch, alewives, blueback herring, and American and hickory shad. Although several shark species likely infrequently wander in and out of the sound, e.g. blue shark, mako shark, hammerhead shark and thresher shark, there are only four species of sharks which are regularly found in the area. These are the sand tiger shark, the sandbar shark, the spiny dogfish and the smooth dogfish.

==== Mollusks ====
Mollusks (gastropods and bivalves) that can be found include the rough periwinkle near the high-tide line, the European periwinkle, the northern yellow periwinkle, the blue mussel (a popular, edible species), the eastern oyster, the Atlantic slipper shell or "common slippershell" (Crepidula fornicata), the hard clam (also known as the quahog, little neck clam or cherrystone clam), the Atlantic bay scallop, the mud snail (also known as the eastern mud nassa), the salt marsh snail (or "coffee bean snail"), the Atlantic oyster drill, the northern moon snail, Atlantic moon snail, the channeled and knobbed whelks.

==== Crustacea ====
Crustaceans include crabs, shrimp and lobsters. In the sound there are the green crab (a non-native species first reported in Boston around 1900, but a common crab found on the shore, where it feeds on eastern oysters and soft-shell clams), blue crab, red crab, Jonah crab in deepwater areas, and the Atlantic rock crab, which settles in large numbers along rocky shores, especially around Millstone Point, Niantic Bay and Fishers Island Sound. Other crabs found include the lady crab, spider crabs, and fiddler crabs; hermit crabs and mole crabs are also found. By the late 1980s, the Japanese shore crab, an invasive species, was the most commonly found crab in the sound.

The sand shrimp Crangon septemspinosa and two species of grass shrimp are plentiful along the shore, especially in late summer and fall. The American lobster is fished commercially.

==== Mammals, reptiles, and amphibians ====
Most animal species on the Connecticut side of the sound also occur inland, but some are much more abundant along the shore. Animals along the sound are most concentrated in the salt marshes. Two species of shrews, the masked shrew and the American short-tailed shrew, are common in salt marshes. The least shrew has been thought to exist in small numbers in the salt marshes of western Connecticut. Rodents include the white-footed mouse, the meadow vole (probably the most abundant coastal mammal) and the meadow jumping mouse. Muskrats are heavily trapped but remain abundant. Raccoons and red foxes who live in areas near the marshes will hunt in them. The long-tailed weasel and short-tailed weasel are both found near the sound, occasionally living in the salt marshes.

Dolphins are occasionally spotted in Long Island Sound, along with Harbor seals and gray seals that can be found among the rocks off Stonington and Groton at the eastern end. Long-finned pilot whales and harbor porpoises can also be infrequently sighted in open water, a few miles off the coast. In 1975, a finback whale beached itself in Groton.

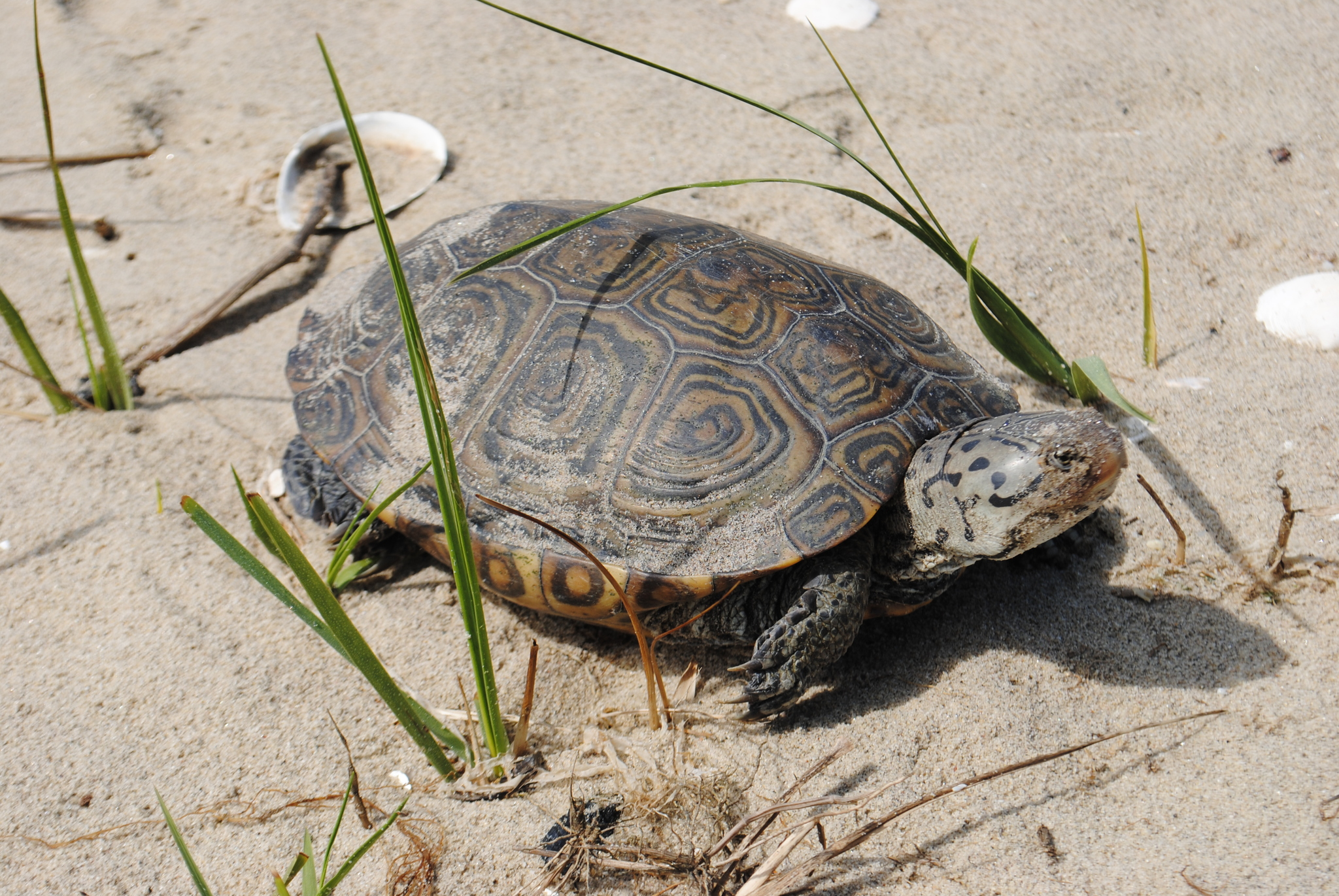
Diamondback terrapins (Malaclemys terrapin) are the only aquatic turtles to reside in brackish water, which makes the Long Island Sound estuary a special habitat for the Northern subspecies.

Animals that need moist woodlands are found in the coastal area (and elsewhere), including the diamondback terrapin in salt marshes and brackish waters (and deposits and hatches its eggs on nearby sandy beaches). Terrapin meat became such a popular delicacy in the early 1900s that the price for a dozen adult females reached as high as US$120. Overhunting made the species uncommon and even rare through most of the sound and eliminated at some places. After its popularity as food declined, the terrapin population started recovering.

Sea turtles occasionally travel north on the Gulf Stream and wander into the sound. The loggerhead turtle, green turtle and leatherback turtle are occasionally seen along the Connecticut shore.

Other reptiles and amphibians found along the edges of the salt marshes and nearby bodies of water include the green frog, bullfrog, pickerel frog, spotted turtle, painted turtle, northern water snake, and common snapping turtle. On beaches and sandy areas there are Fowler's toads (which are also found inland but find sandy areas preferable), the American toad, and the hognose snake (which feeds on Fowler's toads).

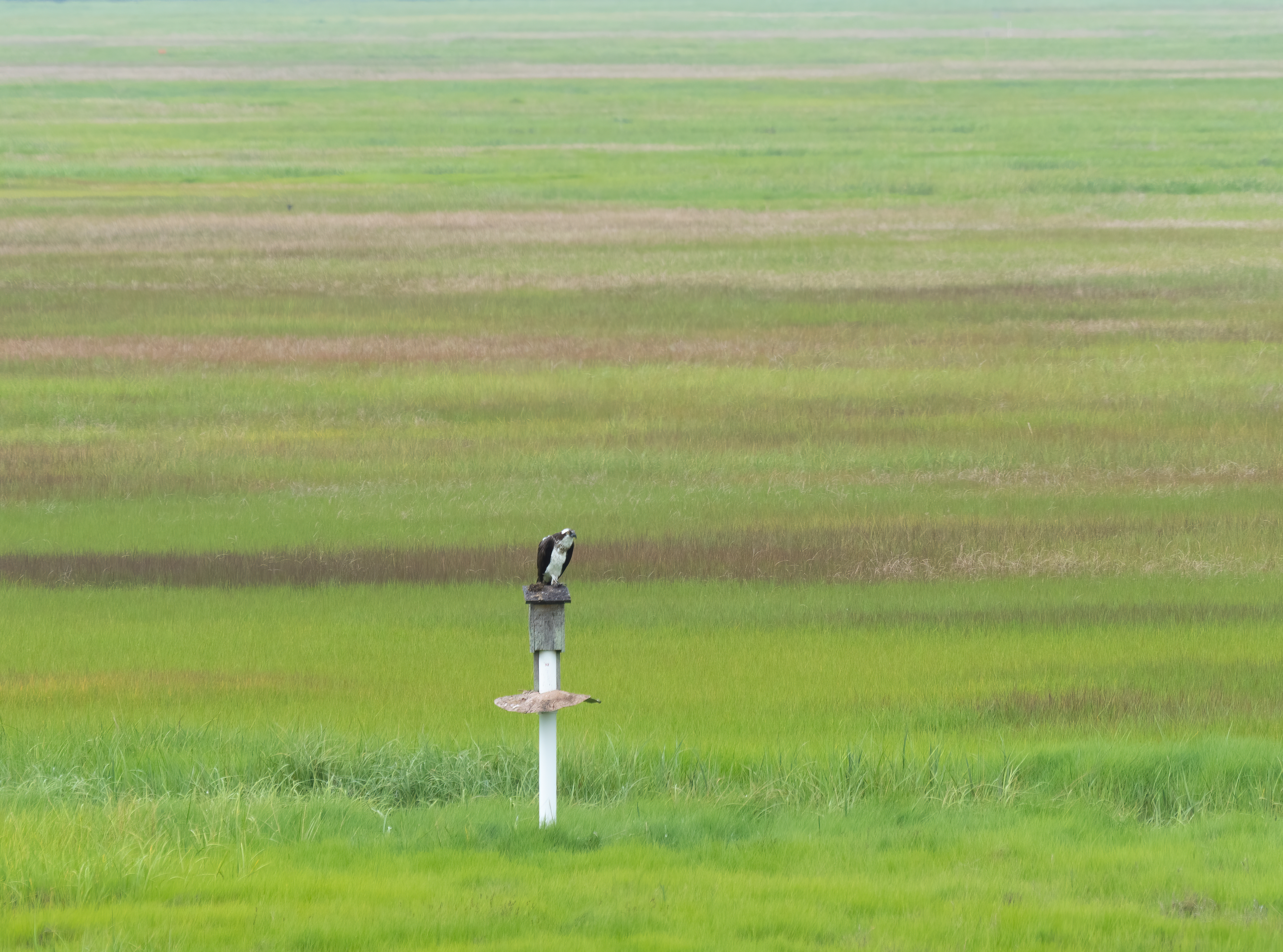
Osprey (Pandion haliaetus), a fish-eating raptor, sitting on a tree swallow's nest box in the marsh at Hammonasset Beach State Park, Madison, CT. Ospreys are frequent summer residents of areas like Long Island Sound and other coastal areas in North America.

==== Birds ====
There are six broad categories of bird habitats near Long Island Sound: (1) open water areas, including bays, coves, rivers and the Sound itself; (2) tidal marshes; (3) mudflats; (4) sandy beaches; (5) offshore islands; and (6) mainland uplands, including woodlands and fields. Some birds are summer residents or winter residents, while others are spring and fall transients. Year round residents include herring gull, great black-backed gull, common tern and double-crested cormorant. Coastal migrants (also called "transients") include shorebirds such as plovers, turnstones, sandpipers, willet and yellowlegs. Summer residents include the osprey, seaside sparrow, saltmarsh sparrow, clapper rail, mallard and black duck, herons and egrets, including the black-crowned night heron and snowy egret as well as the least tern and piping plover. Upland species include the yellow warbler, red-eyed vireo, red-winged blackbird and Carolina wren.

Large flocks of ducks, geese, and swans winter in the sound. In West Haven, Connecticut 8,000 scaup (also called broadbills or bluebills) were regularly counted in the 1970s. Greater scaup, black ducks, mallards, and Canada geese are among the most abundant wintering birds. There are also significant populations of red-breasted mergansers, common goldeneyes, buffleheads, white-winged scoter, American wigeon (also sometimes called baldpate), long-tailed ducks and mute swans. Others (less abundant) include gadwalls, northern pintails, green-winged teal, northern shovelers (also sometimes called broadbill), ruddy ducks, redheads, ring-necked ducks, snow geese, and brant.

==== Rare and endangered species ====
Rare, endangered and extinct species of the sound include the eastern spadefoot, a rare, toadlike amphibian that hasn't been recorded in the area since 1935. Its overall coloring is beige or off-white with a pattern of green markings. Small orange dots punctuate this pattern.

As many as 1,500 shortnose sturgeon, listed as 'endangered' by the Endangered Species Act, inhabit the Connecticut River. Approximately 900 of those live downstream of Holyoke Dam. While shortnose sturgeon primarily remain in their natal rivers, they will feed in estuarine waters like Long Island Sound and make extended trips along the Atlantic Coast, with tagged individuals sometimes being identified in multiple rivers during their lifetimes.

== History ==
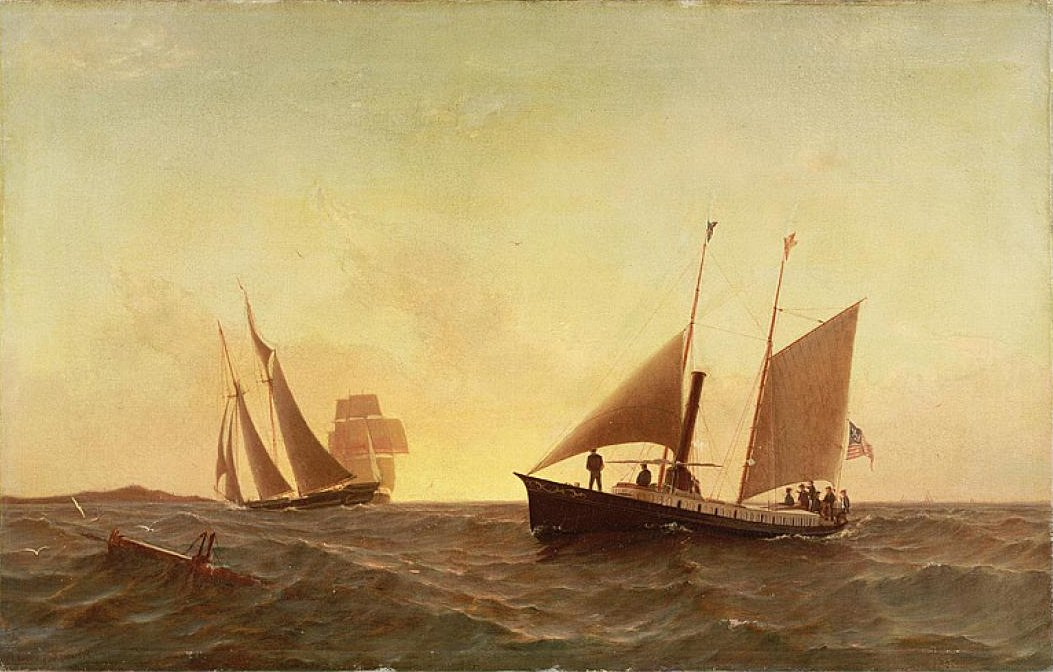
Archibald Cary Smith, Long Island Sound, 1911

Long Island Sound was formed when the terminal moraine that dammed the waters of glacial Lake Connecticut failed, and sea water mixed with the lake's fresh waters. Prior to colonization, it's estimated that around 10,000 to 15,000 natives inhabited along Long Island Sound. The first European to record the existence of Long Island Sound was the Dutch navigator Adriaen Block, who entered the sound from the East River in 1614. The sound was known as The Devil's Belt in colonial times and the reefs that run across the sound were known as Devil's Stepping Stones, from which Stepping Stones Lighthouse got its name.

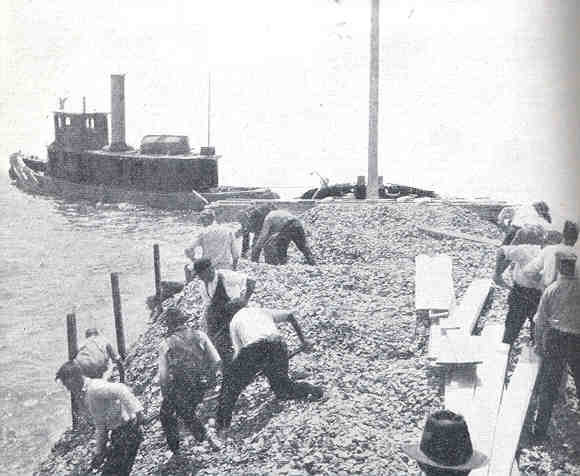
Planting oyster shells in Long Island Sound in order to catch the species reproductive set, 1919

As the Industrial Revolution grew, Long Island Sound began to be utilized more for manufacturing and production uses that are still observed to this day, like textiles, metal finishing, fishing, and oyster harvesting. Yet, the economic and population growth the Industrial Revolution created led to increased pollution. Around the 1950s and 60s, the US Government began to recognize more of the environmental impacts pollution was having on water quality, as well as human health around regions like Long Island Sound. After the Clean Water Act was passed federally in 1972 to protect water quality around the US, the Environmental Protection Agency partnered with Connecticut and New York to pass the Long Island Sound Study (LISS) in 1985 with plans for restoration and clean-up projects in the region. More habitat conservation, health monitoring, and pollution standards have been established between NY and CT in the years since to protect the estuary for future generations.

== Uses ==
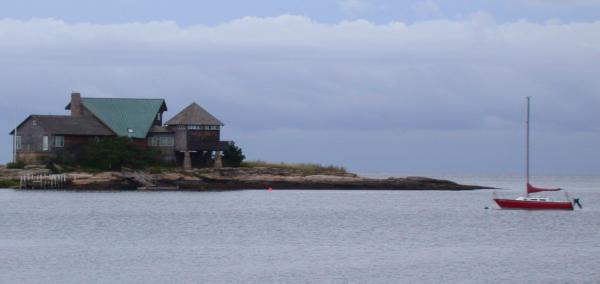
Long Island Sound in Branford, Connecticut

=== Transportation ===
Ferries provide service between Long Island and Connecticut, notably the Bridgeport & Port Jefferson Ferry (between Port Jefferson and Bridgeport), and the Cross Sound Ferry (between Orient Point and New London). The ferries that cross Long Island Sound carry automobiles, trucks and buses, as well as foot passengers.

=== Fishing ===
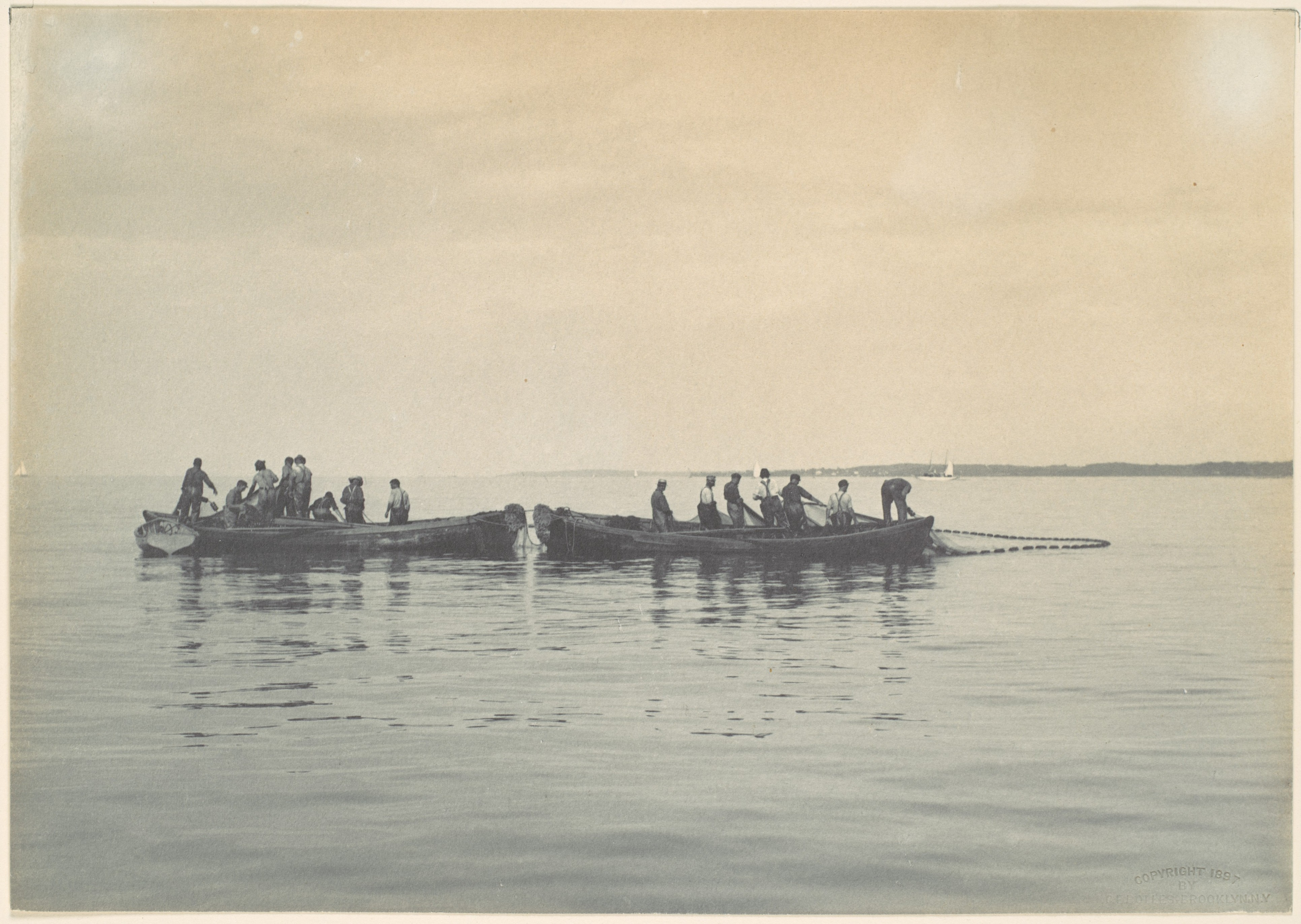
Hauling in nets on Long Island Sound (c. 1897)

Long Island Sound has historically had rich recreational and commercial fishing, including oysters, lobsters, scallops, blue crabs, tuna, flounder, striped bass, and bluefish. However, in recent years the western part of the sound has become increasingly deficient of marine life. The fishing and lobster industries have encouraged efforts to identify the cause of the dead water and rectify the problem.

Lobsters have suffered diseases of unknown cause, but recreational fishing improved dramatically in the last 10 years due, in large part, to restoring a key component in the food chain, menhaden (a.k.a. "bunker") fish which are a mainstay of striped bass and other pelagic fish. The ban of netting of bunker - which were over-fished in the late 1990s - has significantly improved the quality and volume of the striped bass population in Long Island Sound.

=== Further development ===
Long Island Sound from Calf Pasture Beach in Norwalk, Connecticut

Underwater cables transmit electricity under Long Island Sound, most notably a new and controversial Cross Sound Cable that runs from New Haven in western Connecticut, to Shoreham in central Long Island, and an older one from Rye in Westchester County to Oyster Bay on Long Island. Scientists debate whether submarine power cables are safe for marine ecosystems, but installations like large-scale armoring around cables helps to protect overall ecological impact and provides ecosystem regeneration.

Over the years, bridges over the sound have been proposed, including a bridge between Rye in Westchester County and Oyster Bay on Long Island; between New Haven, Connecticut, and Shoreham on Long Island; between Bridgeport, Connecticut, and Port Jefferson on Long Island; or between Orient Point, New York, and Rhode Island. A tunnel under the sound, as between Rye and Oyster Bay has also been proposed, to carry both freeway lanes and railroads. However, no crossing has been built since the Throgs Neck Bridge in the early 1960s.

== Pollution ==
The Long Island Sound ecosystem has historically been polluted by a number of different sources, including industry, agriculture and communities (untreated sewage and urban runoff). Pollutants entering the sound include toxic substances such as heavy metals; a specific example includes mercury discharged by the hatting industry in Danbury, Connecticut. Other pollutants include pathogens, debris, and nutrients (which contain nitrogen and phosphorus from fertilizer runoff).

Eutrophication occurs when bodies of water, like Long Island Sound, are exposed to higher levels of nutrients like nitrogen, causing harmful overgrowth of cyanobacteria that feed on them. Eutrophication can also lead to algal blooms and eventually hypoxia, when runoff into water causes rapid development of algae and phytoplankton that blocks the surface of water from sunlight and deprives oxygen to marine organisms. Eutrophication and its effects are direct environmental impacts on the sound that are exacerbated by higher temperatures, stratified water columns (when the water is not well mixed vertically) and excess nutrients. The primary target for water remediation tactics in Long Island Sound have been nutrients discharged by sewage treatment plants and in surface runoff.

Long Island Sound sustains significant populations of fish and nurseries. This biological function has been threatened by both terrestrial and chemical alterations resulting from urbanization of the area. Specifically 25–35% of the tidal wetlands in the sound have been dredged, filled, and developed over and hypoxia and eutrophication resulting from pollution have led to low dissolved oxygen levels (less than 4.8 mg of oxygen per liter) in the water. The low dissolved oxygen levels limit the fishes' ability to swim, feed, grow and reproduce and loss of habitat prevents success in fish larval growth. The impacts listed here are directly associated with these specific species in Long Island Sound: killifishes, silversides, bay anchovy, eels, menhaden, cunner, tautog, sticklebacks, winter flounder, weakfish, bluefish, tomcod and striped bass.

An example of impacts from nitrogen is a shift in the types of plankton that make up their community in Long Island Sound. Over the last several decades, excess nitrogen may have adversely affected diatoms—microscopic, single-celled algae at the base of the food chain, which make shells ('frustules') of opaline silica. When diatoms are less productive, they are replaced by other phytoplankton such as dinoflagellates or blue-green algae, which grow well in waters with high nitrogen levels, but do not need silica. Such changes in the base of the food chain leads to consequences such as an increase in abundance of jellyfish and decline in shellfish and other fish.

Starting in the 1990s, Connecticut and federal United States Environmental Protection Agency (EPA) officials defined no-dumping areas in which commercial or recreational boat users were prohibited from releasing untreated sewage into the sound near the coastline. In 2007 the ban was extended to the entire Connecticut coast and applied to both treated and untreated sewage. From the 1990s to 2007, the number of pumping stations for boat sewage tripled to 90 at marinas along the Connecticut coast. As of 2007, violators could be charged with a state misdemeanor and face $250 fines, or a federal civil penalty, with fines of up to $2,000. In 2011, the EPA approved a no-discharge zone for the New York waters of the sound, covering about 760 square miles (2,000 km^{2}) from the Hell Gate Bridge on the East River to the northern edge of Block Island Sound. With both states' waters covered, boats are banned from discharging sewage anywhere in the sound.

To address the water quality problems, EPA created the Long Island Sound Study (LISS) in 1985, which led to LISS's Comprehensive Conservation and Management Plan (CCMP) to support development of a nitrogen total maximum daily load (TMDL) in 1994. The TMDL implements innovative strategies, including a nitrogen credit trading program for sewage treatment plants in Connecticut, and bubble permits for sewage treatment plants in New York. Results point to significant nitrogen reductions in Long Island Sound, and significant cost savings. By 1998, a plan to reduce nitrogen outputs of effluent into the sound was agreed upon by the federal government and the states of New York and Connecticut. The goal was to reduce the amount of nitrogen entering the sound by 58.5 percent as of 2014. New York City agreed with New York state and Connecticut to reduce nitrogen levels in 2001, but backed off its commitment and was sued by the state. In early 2006, the city agreed to lower nitrogen outputs and was given until 2017 to meet its reduction goals. By 2007, $617 million had been spent in upgrading sewage treatment plants, with 39 out of 104 retrofitted with devices to remove nitrogen.

According to the EPA National Estuary Program Coastal Protection Report for June 2007, the western part of the sound was in the worst condition. The report gives a "fair" rating to water quality in the sound and poor marks to fish, bottom-feeders and sediment. High levels of PCBs were found in fish samples, and high concentrations of the pesticide DDT were found in sediment. Development resulting from population increases, past industrial pollution and stormwater runoff all contribute to the poor quality of the water, according to the report.

Nitrogen pollution in the sound has been declining in the 21st century. A 2021 study found that bottom-water dissolved oxygen increased and the extent of hypoxia decreased despite warming conditions, with the improvements associated with reductions in nitrogen loading. By 2016, both NY and CT attained their goals to reduce nitrogen percentages by 58.5 percent established in the TMDL. According to LISS as of 2018, significant improvements to wastewater treatment plants have led to "over 50 million fewer pounds of nitrogen a year are discharged into Long Island Sound" in comparison to the 1990s. In 2015 the Long Island Sound Study concluded that the sound is cleaner and healthier than it has been, but still impaired from pollution and habitat loss. To continue improving the quality of Long Island Sound, both ongoing challenges and adapting to new conditions due to climate change need to be addressed.

In 2025, the Long Island Sound Study was renamed the Long Island Sound Partnership, and federal and state partners announced a new Comprehensive Conservation and Management Plan. The EPA reported that since the partnership was established, the area experiencing unhealthy dissolved oxygen levels had been reduced by half, 2,400 acres (970 ha) of coastal habitat had been restored, 8,000 acres (3,200 ha) had been protected, and 448 miles (721 km) of rivers and streams had been reconnected.

=== Dumping of dredged sediment ===
Polluted sediment from harbor, river and waterway dredging has been dumped in four sites in the sound, although in late 2007 two of them at the eastern end of the sound were scheduled to be closed at some future date. A dumping site near Stamford, Connecticut, and another near New Haven, Connecticut, were expected to remain open. In 2007, the U.S. EPA and U.S. Army Corps of Engineers began a five- to seven-year, $16 million study on more environmentally friendly ways to dredge harbors in the sound. Dumping the sediment in the sound is considerably less expensive than other options, according to Connecticut harbor officials and state and federal environmental officials.

Federal officials had concluded that sediment from Bridgeport Harbor was too contaminated for disposal in the sound, and in 2007 the Connecticut Department of Environmental Protection (DEP) required Norwalk, Connecticut, to "cap" 350,000 cubic yards (270,000 m^{3}) of dumped sediment from a planned Norwalk Harbor dredging project with 75,000 cubic yards (57,000 m^{3}) of material. Silt and sediment from the harbor contains heavy metals and polycyclic aromatic hydrocarbons, according to DEP officials.

== Legal status ==
In 1985, the Supreme Court of the United States ruled in United States v. Maine, 469 U.S. 504 (1985) that Long Island Sound is a juridical bay. The case involved a jurisdictional dispute among New York State, Rhode Island, and the United States.

In addition to ruling on some matters concerning Block Island Sound and the State of Rhode Island, the Court held that Long Island is not an island but an extension of the mainland, based on the East River in its natural state not having been sufficiently navigable, such that the "shallowness and inutility" of its waters were inadequate, and that the river itself was not an "opening to the sea". Based upon this (and appurtenant criteria in the law) it found that Long Island Sound is a 'juridical bay'.

The classification of 'juridical bay' describes "an indentation into the mainland that qualifies for inland water status under the criteria of Article 7 of the 1958 (Convention on the Territorial Sea and the Contiguous Zone) and the United Nations Law of the Sea Convention (LOSC) of 1982 Article 10." In short, it is a coastal body of water where the total area of its impoundment is larger than the area of a semi-circle drawn across its mouth.

The decision resolved whether the affected states or the Federal government held sovereignty over the seabed more than 3 miles off the seacoast bordering Long Island Sound. The Court held in favor of the states.

By default, the finding also means that the legal coastline of the United States incorporates the southern shore of Long Island, but not its northern shore, the eastern shores of Westchester County, the Bronx, and Manhattan, and the southern shores of Connecticut.

== See also ==
- Lower New York Bay
- Upper New York Bay
- Geography of New York City
- Coastal and Estuarine Research Federation
- Longshore Sailing School
- Sound (geography)
