= Glacial Lake Cape Cod =

Former glacial lake in Massachusetts

Coordinates: 41°54′N 70°17′W

Glacial Lake Cape Cod was a glacial lake that formed during the late Pleistocene epoch inside modern Cape Cod Bay. After the Laurentide Ice Sheet retreated, glacial ice melt accumulated at the terminal moraine and blocked up the escape of glacial meltwater, creating the lake. Drainage from the lake occurred at Bass River, the location of the Cape Cod Canal and Orleans Harbor.

== See also ==
- Glacial Lake Nantucket Sound
- Lake Connecticut
