= Glacial Lake Nantucket Sound =

Former lake in the United States

Coordinates: 41°31′4.23″N 70°9′56.60″W

Glacial Lake Nantucket Sound was a glacial lake that formed during the late Pleistocene epoch inside modern Nantucket Sound. After the Laurentide Ice Sheet retreated, glacial ice melt washed over the terminal moraine of Cape Cod and the glacial meltwater settled in the modern day sound, creating the lake.

== See also ==
- Glacial Lake Cape Cod
- Lake Connecticut
