= Fair Hill Burial Ground =

Historic site in Philadelphia, Pennsylvania

- U.S. National Register of Historic Places
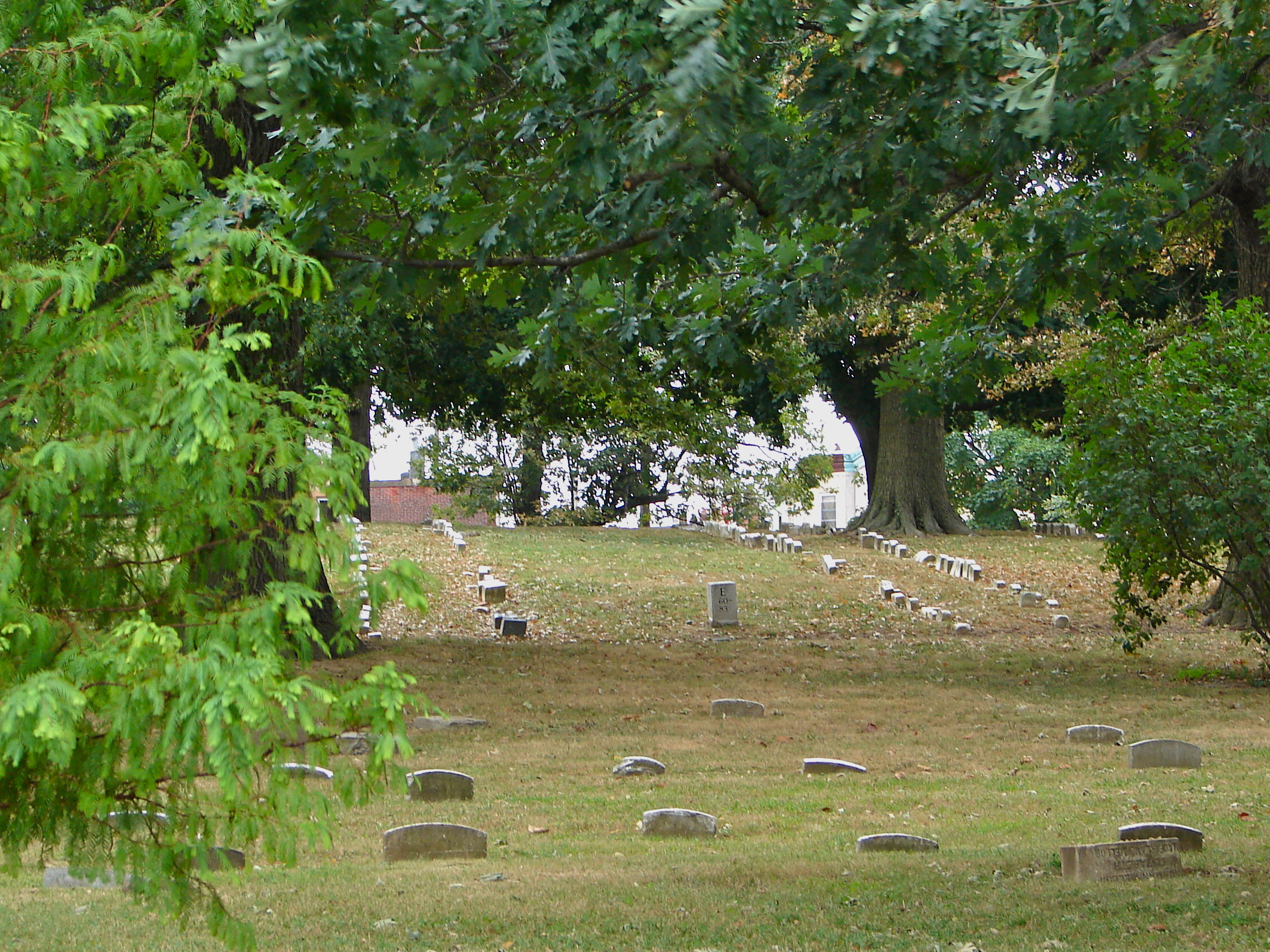

- Location within Philadelphia Location within Pennsylvania Location within the United States
- Location: Roughly along Germantown, and Indiana Aves., Ninth, and Cambria Sts., Philadelphia, Pennsylvania
- Coordinates: 39°59′48″N 75°8′47″W
- Area: 4.5 acres (1.8 ha)
- NRHP reference No.: 98000900
- Added to NRHP: August 7, 1998

Fair Hill Burial Ground is a historic cemetery in the Fairhill neighborhood of Philadelphia, Pennsylvania. Founded by the Religious Society of Friends in 1703, it fell into disuse until the 1840s when it was revived by the Hicksite Quaker community of Philadelphia, which played an important role in the abolition and early women's rights movements. The cemetery is currently operated by the Fair Hill Burial Corporation, which is owned by Quakers and neighborhood community members.

It was added to the National Register of Historic Places in 1998.

== History ==
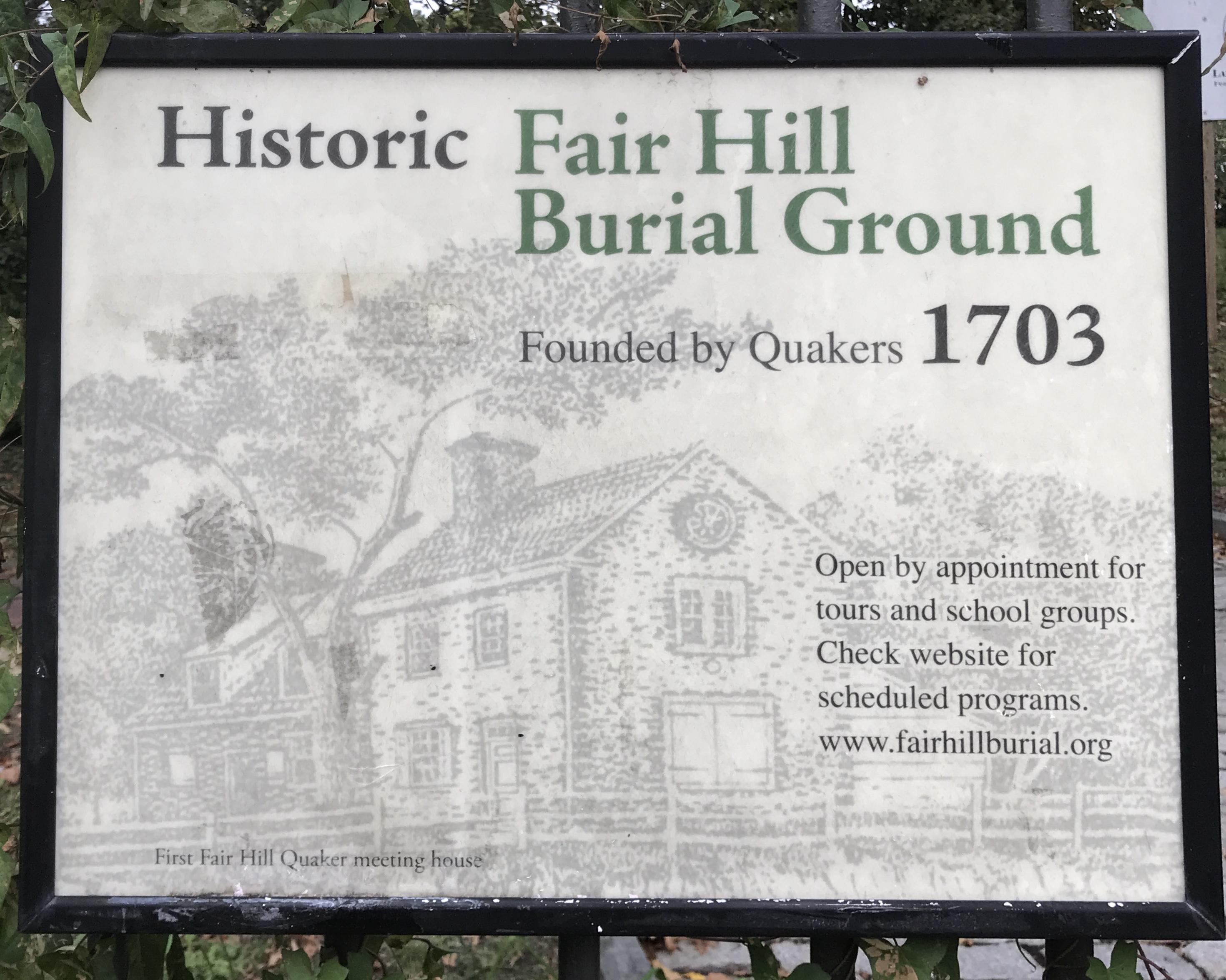
Sign at entrance

William Penn gave 1250 acres in Pennsylvania to George Fox in 1681. Fox dedicated six acres in 1686 for a meeting house and burial ground near the current site of the burial ground. Burials began about 1707, but the site did not develop into an active burial ground. The Green Street Monthly Meeting took control of the site in 1818.

Following the Orthodox-Hicksite split, the three Hicksite meetings in Philadelphia in 1840 – Philadelphia Meeting, Spruce Street Meeting, Green Street Meeting – agreed to use the land for a burial ground. Starting in 1843, a Joint Committee on Interments oversaw the burial ground. The Fair Hill Meeting House was built nearby, on Cambria Street in the 1880s.

Both the meetinghouse and the burial ground were sold to Ephesians Baptist Church in 1985, but in 1993 the burial ground was purchased by the Philadelphia Quarterly Meeting, which continues to own and maintain it.

== Notable interments ==
- Rudolph Blankenburg, reformist mayor of Philadelphia
- Lucretia Longshore Blankenburg, American second-generation suffragist, social activist, civic reformer, writer, and first lady of Philadelphia
- William Morris Davis, US Congressman
- Mary J. Scarlett Dixon (1822-1900), physician
- Anna Jeanes, Quaker philanthropist
- Mary Ann M'Clintock
- Thomas M'Clintock
- Mira Sharpless Townsend (1798-1859), social reformer, activist and founder of the Rosine Association for the support of destitute women
- Lucretia Mott, abolitionist, women's rights activist, and social reformer
- Edward Parrish, pharmacist and the first president of Swarthmore College
- Ann Preston, first woman dean of a US medical school
- Harriet Forten Purvis
- Robert Purvis
- Deborah Fisher Wharton
