= Mary J. Scarlett Dixon =

American physician (1822–1900)

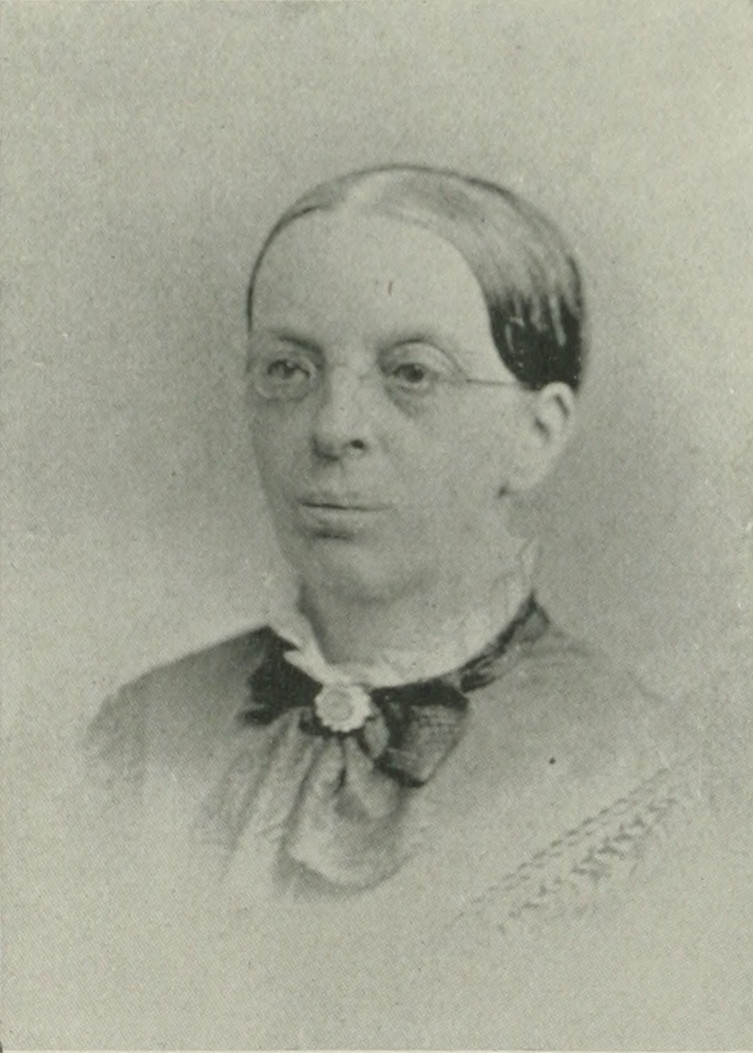
- Born: October 23, 1822; Robeson Township, Pennsylvania
- Died: January 28, 1900 (aged 77); Philadelphia, Pennsylvania
- Burial place: Fair Hill Burial Ground
- Education: Female Medical College of Pennsylvania, 1857
- Occupation: Physician

Mary J. Scarlett Dixon (née, Scarlett; October 23, 1822 – January 28, 1900) was an American physician and abolitionist from Pennsylvania.

== Early life and education ==
Mary J. Scarlett was born in Robeson Township, Berks County, Pennsylvania, on October 23, 1822. Her parents were members of the Society of Friends, and Mary was the youngest of seven children. Her father was a farmer. He died when she was about four years old, and a brother's death soon after left the mother with six children, on a farm which was not very productive.

Dixon received her education in West Chester and Kennett Square, Pennsylvania.

== Abolitionist ==
When the agitation against slavery loomed up in 1830, the Scarlett family was the only one in the neighborhood that took an active part in the abolitionist movement, and their house began hosting anti-slavery lectures. When Mary was sixteen years old, her mother died.

After the family estate was settled, Dixon began to teach in country schools. She taught at Haramony school, in Bart township; she also taught in the family of Thomas Whitson, who then lived near Smyrna.

Dixon and her sister Catharine kept a "free store" in Pennsgrove, Chester County, Pennsylvania but the Catherine's marriage ended this work. After teaching a few years, Dixon went to boarding-school for a year, and again taught for a time, and went again to boarding-school one term.

== Medical school ==
Dixon had reportedly dream of a career in medicine from early childhood. With the aim of becoming a physician, her teaching was to provide means. When, in 1850, the Female Medical College of Pennsylvania (later, Woman's Medical College of Pennsylvania), began accepting students, she received information from one of its professors. Duties to her oldest sister prevented her from entering until the autumn of 1855. Dixon was graduated in 1857.

Feeling that the time for study was too short, Dixon took another course of lectures, better to fit her for general practice. During that course of lectures, she took special pains to obtain practice among the poor, in order to build up the clinic at the college, not only for her own benefit, hut for the general good of the college.

== Career ==
During a part of 1858-59, Dixon gave lectures on hygiene in country towns and villages. In the autumn of 1859, she was appointed demonstrator of anatomy in the Woman's Medical College and returned to Philadelphia to take the position. The hospitals in the city were not open to women physicians for instruction, and the college management felt it necessary to make some change for the better clinical instruction of the students. Larger buildings were purchased for a woman's hospital, in which rooms could be utilized temporarily for college purposes. In the hospital Emeline Horton Cleveland, M.D., was appointed resident physician and Dr. Scarlett, assistant physician. There, they built up a good clinic and outdoor practice, which, in addition to the hospital, afforded the students good opportunities for practical instruction. In 1862, Dixon became professor of anatomy in the college. After a few years, feeling she had undertaken too much, she resigned the position of demonstrator of anatomy. In 1865, she resigned the position of assistant physician in the hospital, to make a home for herself. In 1868, she returned to the hospital as resident physician, remaining there until 1871, when she returned to her home, at the same time being appointed visiting physician to the hospital.

On May 8, 1873, she married G. Washington Dixon, still retaining her professorship and engaged in active practice, along with her duties as professor of anatomy. In 1881, her connection with the college was discontinued. As glaucoma was troubling her, she placed herself under the care of a skilled ophthalmologist for the treatment of her eyes. She continued actively engaged until through diminished vision, she was forced to hand over many patients to others, though she continued to treat some cases.

In 1881-82, DIxon served as Vice-President and Corresponding Secretary for the Woman's Medical College of Pennsylvania Alumnae Association. (Note: After marriage, her surname was sometimes written, Scarlett-Dixon.) Dixon was elected vice-president in 1890 of the newly-established National Woman's Health Association of America.

== Personal life ==
Dixon resided in Philadelphia. She removed to the home of her nephew, Samuel (or Levi) Lewis, in West Chester, Pennsylvania, after her husband's death, which preceded hers by three years. She died at her nephew's home, January 28, 1900. (Note: According to Shrady & Stedman (1900), Dixon died January 29, 1900.) She is interred at Fair Hill Burial Ground.
