= Mira Sharpless Townsend =

Quaker activist and reformer (1798–1859)

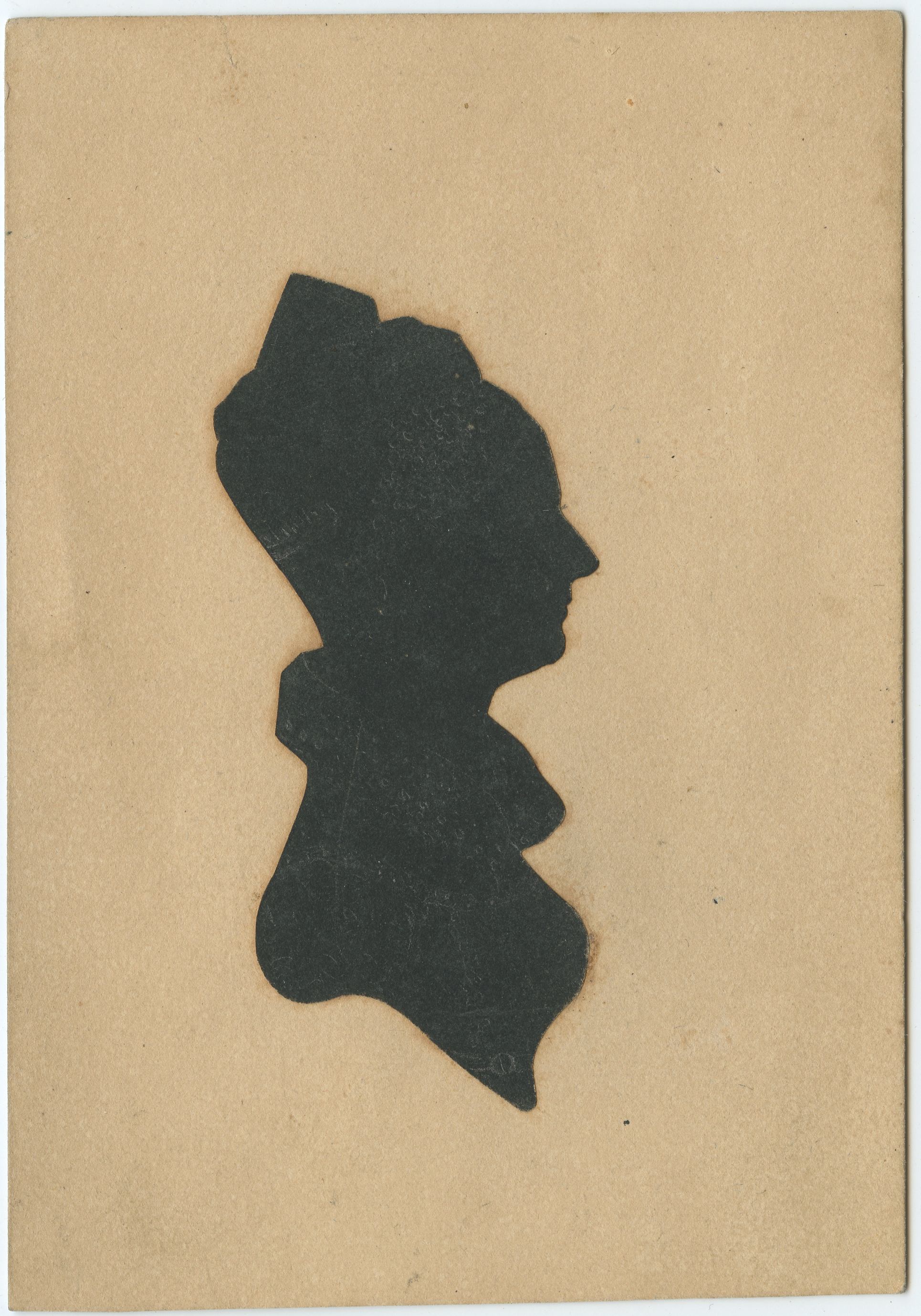
- Born: Mira Sharpless; September 26, 1798; Philadelphia
- Died: November 20, 1859 (aged 61)
- Education: Friends Select School
- Occupations: Social activist, reformer
- Organization: The Rosine Association (founded)
- Spouse: Samuel Townsend
- Children: 6
- Parents: Jesse Sharpless (father); Joanna Townsend Sharpless (mother)

Mira Sharpless Townsend (26 September 1798 - 20 November 1859) was a Quaker social activist and reformer in Philadelphia, Pennsylvania. Townsend was the driving force behind the creation of the Rosine Association, which supported destitute women, and was the first organization of its kind run entirely by and for women.

== Early life ==
Mira Sharpless was born in Philadelphia on 26 September 1798, the daughter of Jesse Sharpless, a saddle and harness maker, and Joanna Townsend Sharpless., both birthright members of the Concord Monthly Meeting. She was directly descended from Richard Townsend, who had come to America with William Penn on the ship Welcome. She attended Friends Select School, where she excelled, and was noted for her skill in writing. Most of Sharpless' siblings were active in the Society of Friends.

In 1828, Sharpless married Samuel Townsend (1800-1887), a fellow Quaker. Of the couple's six children, only two survived to adulthood: Emily Sharpless Townsend and Clara Gordon Townsend.

== Activism ==
From the 1840s, Townsend became an outspoken social activist, publishing articles and poetry expressing her views on subjects including capital punishment, temperance, women's rights, and slavery. Townsend spearheaded the creation of the Rosine Association, which focused on providing assistance to women. Her hopes were first announced at a meeting of the Society for the Abolition of Capital Punishment in January 1847, when Townsend expressed a desire to form "a society to open a house for the reformation and employment and instruction of unfortunate women who had led immoral lives." This was established as the Rosina Home. As the first organization of its kind run entirely by and for women, the Rosine Association was unique and trailblazing. Sharpless wrote of her feeling that:

it was her duty, having been given the health and ability, to help the friendless and the unfortunate, to give them the power as far as she could to make for themselves a name, a position and a respectable living.

As one of a five-person committee, Townsend helped to create the Association's constitution. She served as a manager and treasurer until her death. In 1854, Townsend and Sophia Lewis successfully petitioned the legislature in Harrisburg for funding to support the Rosine Association. Detailed casebooks, held today by Swarthmore College, contain accounts of the "Rosines": women who passed through the Rosine Home. These women were supported in learning skills, and supporting themselves by selling wares they produced. The Rosina Home inspired similar institutions in Baltimore, New Orleans, Providence, and Cincinnati. In 1849, Townsend, her sister Eliza Parker, and others, established a boarding house for destitute women and children, the Temporary Home. This was described as:

a transient boarding house for respectable women out of employment, where those with funds can be accommodated at a moderate board, and those without be received until suitable situations can be procured for them; and where also destitute children can be taken care of until suitable homes can be procured; and to secure from fraud and imposition a class of persons whose homeless situation exposes them to the arts of the vicious and designing, and to provide a safe shelter.

== Death and legacy ==
Mira Sharpless Townsend died on 20 November 1859 and was buried at Fair Hill Burial Ground.

Sharpless' papers are held today in the Friends Historical Library of Swarthmore College, which describes her as "a major Quaker social activist and reformer". Speaking on the acquisition of the papers, the Friends Historical Library curator, Jordan Landes, said of Sharpless that:

She was in the vanguard of a group of 19th-century women who reimagined their roles in bringing positive change to the world outside of their home circle... Her distinctive voice shines through more than a century after her death, presenting the stories of Philadelphia's 19th-century female underclass in a matter-of-fact tone, with rich detail.
