= Lake Connecticut =

Glacial Lake Connecticut
- Interactive map of Glacial Lake Connecticut
- Location: Over what is now Long Island Sound and coastal Connecticut
- Coordinates: 41°5′30.38″N 72°54′9.1″W
- Type: Glacial lake
- Primary inflows: Meltwater from the Laurentide Ice Sheet
- Primary outflows: The Race (tidal outlet between the North Fork of Long Island and Fishers Island)
- Basin countries: United States
- Max. length: About the same size as present-day Long Island Sound
- Average depth: 78 ft (24 m)

Glacial Lake Connecticut formed over what is now Long Island Sound and coastal Connecticut at the fore edge of the ice sheet of the Wisconsin glaciation, as the lobe of the Laurentide Ice Sheet began to retreat, some 18 to 20,000 years before present. It was dammed by the terminal moraine that now forms the spine of Long Island, Fishers Island and Watch Hill, Rhode Island. About 15,000 BP, the moraine dam that impounded Lake Connecticut failed; the outlet, known as The Race for its tidal rip currents, lies between the North Fork of Long Island and Fishers Island. For a time, much of the lake bed was exposed to wind-driven erosion: the cue is found in soundings that reveal regional unconformities in the sediment bed of Long Island Sound.

The fore-edge lake formed by glacial meltwater expanded to be about the same size as present-day Long Island Sound; it may have been connected at times with similar freshwater lakes in Block Island Sound and Buzzards Bay, while sea level was low. The fairly shallow average depth of 78 feet (24 m) of today's Long Island Sound is the result of fine lake-bottom sediments deposited as glacial outwash slowed in Lake Connecticut. Suspended as rock flour, the fine sediments would have rendered Lake Connecticut a turquoise blue-green.

The end of Lake Connecticut was marked by a series of intervals of salt water incursion after about 15,000 BP and subsequent refreshening, as rising sea levels and isostatic rebound of land depressed by the former weight of ice sheets adjusted to one another.

== See also ==
- Glacial Lake Cape Cod
- Glacial Lake Nantucket Sound
