= Hannah Longshore =

American physician (1819-1901)

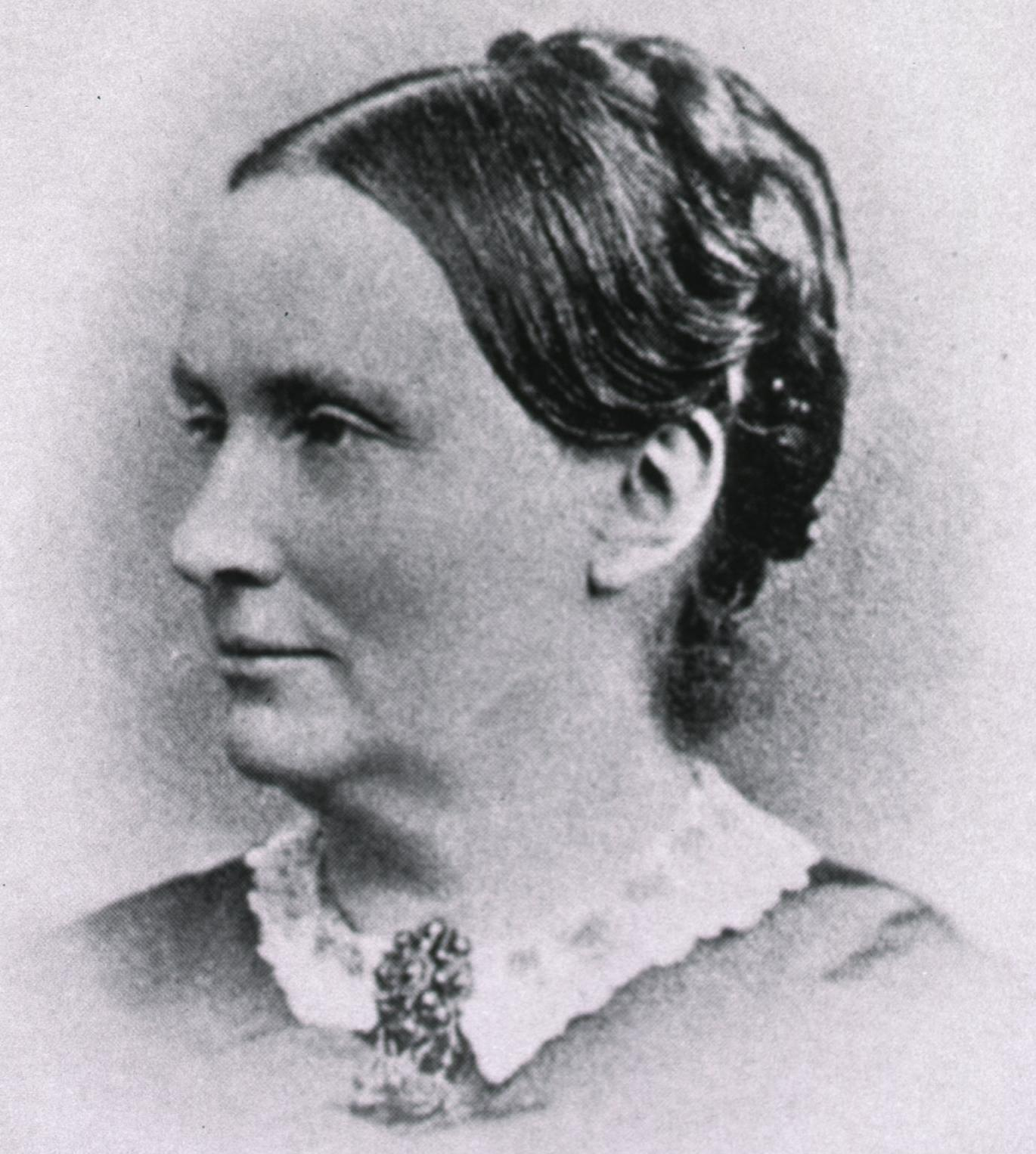
- Born: Hannah E. Myers; May 30, 1819; Sandy Spring, Maryland, United States
- Died: October 19, 1901 (aged 82); Philadelphia, Pennsylvania, US
- Education: Woman's Medical College of Pennsylvania
- Occupation: Physician
- Relatives: Anna M. Longshore Potts (sister-in-law); Mary Frame Myers Thomas (sister)

Signature
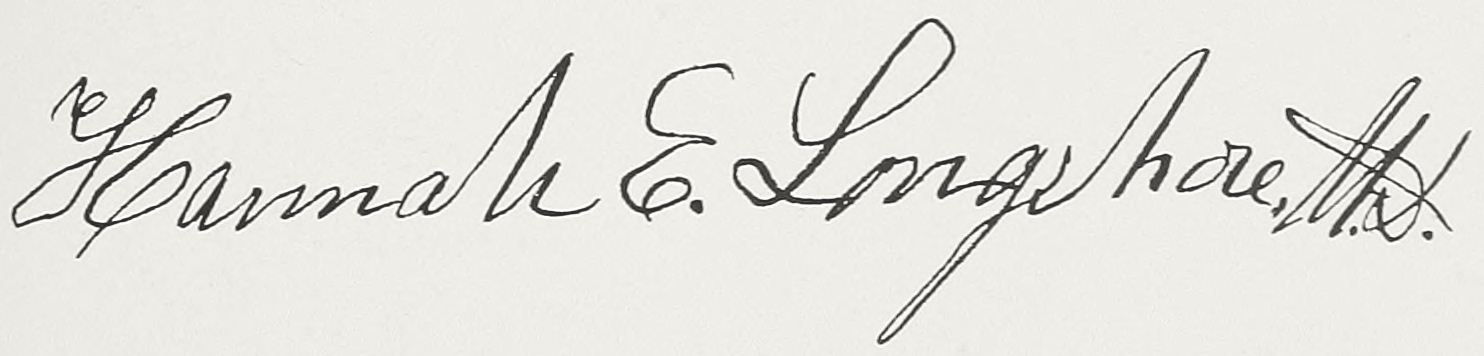

Hannah E. Longshore (née Myers; May 30, 1819 – October 19, 1901) was an American physician and the first woman to be appointed to the faculty of an American medical college, at the Woman's Medical College of Pennsylvania, where she was part of the first graduating class. She then taught at the college and later at Pennsylvania Medical University before opening a private practice.

== Personal life ==
Hannah E. Myers was born to Quaker parents Samuel Myers and Paulina Oden Myers in Sandy Spring, Maryland, on May 30, 1819. She had six siblings and moved with her family to Ohio at the age of 14.

On March 26, 1841, she married Thomas Ellwood Longshore of Philadelphia, who was supportive of her medical career. When the couple's two children were young, Longshore suspended her medical studies for six years, but resumed them when her youngest child was four years old.

Two of her sisters, Jane Myers and Mary Frame Myers Thomas, were also physicians having both graduated from Pennsylvania Medical University. Longshore's daughter Lucretia, later Lucretia Longshore Blankenburg, went on to become a proponent of public health measures in Philadelphia.

In 1901, Hannah Longshore died of uremia at 82 in Philadelphia.

== Career ==
Longshore received private medical training from her brother-in-law Prof. Joseph S. Longshore (1809-1879) before being among the first class of ten women graduating in 1851 from the Female Medical College of Pennsylvania, which had been founded by several male doctors including Prof. Longshore. After graduating, she served as "demonstrator of anatomy" at the college for two years, making her the first female faculty member at a US medical college. She taught for a year at the Female Medical College of Pennsylvania, and then taught anatomy at the Pennsylvania Medical University from 1853 to 1857.

As Philadelphia-based Female Medical College had established a faculty-exchange system with the New England Female Medical College in Boston, Longshore found a position in Boston demonstrating anatomy from February to June 1852. She returned to Philadelphia to work at the Female Medical College later that year, but left in 1853 after a rift with the college faculty over how medicine should be taught. When Joseph Longshore and others left the college to start a new eclectic medical school, the Pennsylvania Medical University, Hannah Longshore went with them. She taught anatomy at the Pennsylvania Medical University for the next four years. During the course of her career, Longshore wrote and gave public talks (titled "Lectures to Women") and, according to her husband, saw approximately 40 patients a day at her clinical practice. At first she found difficulty after opening her practice; other doctors mocked her and pharmacists refused to fulfill her prescriptions - a hardship that she countered by carrying her own medications, thus "pleasing her patients." She eventually stopped teaching and lecturing in favor of focusing on her practice, where she worked for a further 40 years and retired with a "modest fortune."
