= Lucretia Blankenburg =

American suffragist (1845–1937)

Lucretia Longshore Blankenburg
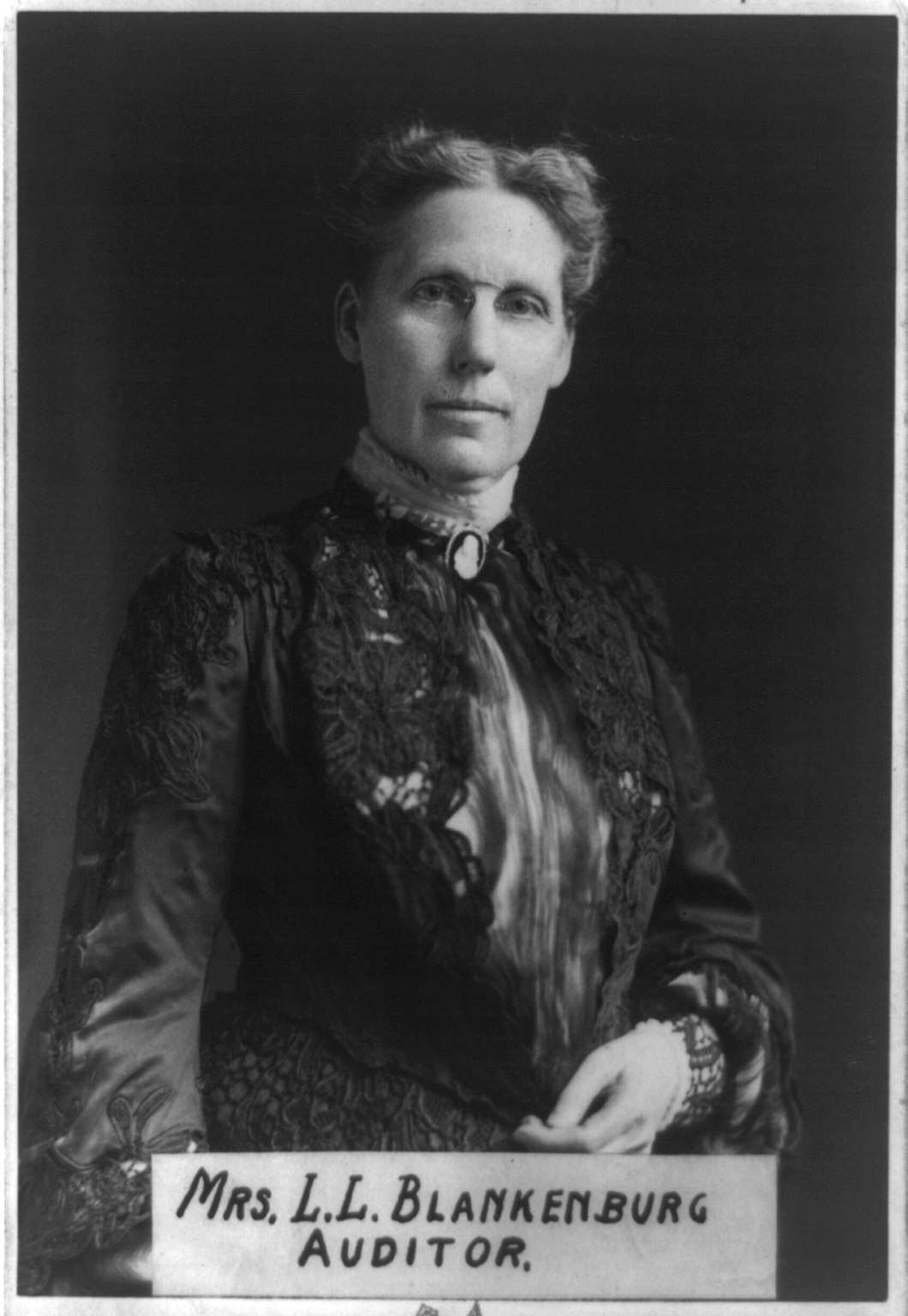
- Born: Lucretia Longshore; May 8, 1845 near New Lisbon, Ohio
- Died: March 28, 1937 (aged 91); Philadelphia, Pennsylvania
- Other name: Mrs. Rudolph Blankenburg
- Occupations: Suffragist, social activist, civic reformer, and writer
- Spouse: Rudolph Blankenburg
- Relatives: Anna M. Longshore Potts (aunt)

Lucretia Blankenburg (née Longshore; May 8, 1845 – March 28, 1937) was an American second-generation suffragist, social activist, civic reformer, and writer. During the period of 1892 until 1908, she served as president of the Pennsylvania Woman Suffrage Association.

Her husband, Rudolph Blankenburg, served as mayor of Philadelphia. Together, the Blankenburgs worked for the things that uplifted humanity, that made for cleaner politics, and for better citizenship. During his term, she aided the city in scores of ways, doing some of the routine speech-making for him. She took almost full charge handling his correspondence.

Blankenburg was one of the leading club women of the city. She served as vice-president of the National Education Association; president of the Pennsylvania State Suffrage Association, 1892; and first vice-president of the General Federation of Women's Clubs, 1912–1914. She was a member of the New Century Club, the Working Women's Guild, and the Civic Club. Blankenburg addressed the Pennsylvania General Assembly numerous times. She held four different meetings in the hall of the House of Representatives in behalf of laws for women, and spoke often in both House and Senate. She also spoke at Congress when her organizations had hearings on bills.

== Early years and education ==
Lucretia Longshore was born May 8, 1845, on a farm near New Lisbon, Ohio (now Lisbon, Ohio), her maternal grandfather, Samuel Myers, having settled there in 1833. Mark Hanna was born on the adjacent farm. She was the only daughter of the Quaker school teacher, Thomas Ellwood Longshore and the physician, Dr. Hannah E. Longshore, of Philadelphia. Dr. Longshore was one of the women pioneers in the medical profession. Blankenburg was named for Lucretia Mott, a pioneer woman suffragist and a Friend; Lucretia Mott was Hannah Longshore's intimate friend.

In 1845, Blankenburg, age six-months-old, her parents, and her brother, Channing (born 1842; became a physician), removed to Attleboro, Pennsylvania (now Langhorne, Pennsylvania). Five years later, the family moved to Philadelphia so that Hannah could attend medical school. She was graduated in the first class of the Woman's Medical College of Pennsylvania. Hannah's sister, Dr. Anna M. Longshore-Potts, graduated in the same class.

Blankenburg attended the Friend's Central School in Philadelphia. She was shunned by her playmates, who pelted her with stones and sticks, refusing to admit her to any of their childish sports. They called her "The woman doctor's child", a term intended to convey as much reproach as that of "witch's daughter" in New England colonial days. After graduating from this school and the Bryant and Stratton Commercial College, she enrolled in the Woman's Medical College, but later withdrew after deciding that she did not want to pursue the study of medicine.

== Career ==
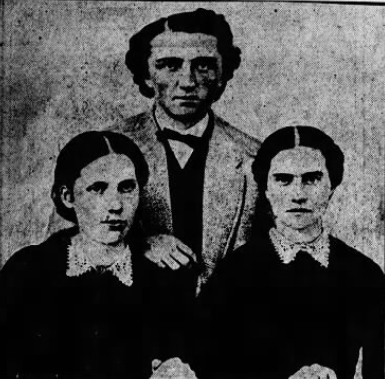
Before their wedding, 1867. Mrs. Julia A. Myers, Lucretia's aunt, is on the right.

When she was a young girl, a German youth, age 22, Rudolph Blankenburg, came to Philadelphia with letters of introduction to her family. At once, he became a welcome visitor. When he had made a start in the new country, on April 18, 1867, Rudolph and Lucretia were married. Three daughters were born to the young couple; but none lived past childhood. After the grief following their death had softened, the Blankenburgs endeavored to fill the vacant place. They adopted a daughter.

=== Social activist and civic reformer ===
After the Centennial Exposition in Philadelphia, 1876, the Blankenburgs began their public work. The exposition had called for assistance from all public-spirited citizens and there seemed much to be done when it ended. The Blankenburg business of manufacturing bedquilts, spreads and yarn was doing well, and its head, unlike the average money-maker, thought he could discern equally important duties elsewhere. Blankenburg began by joining a woman's club.

Women's clubs were few and the majority of those in existence were given over to literary and musical events and to the study of Shakespeare and Browning. A committee of the New Century Club, of which Blankenburg was a member and co-founder, interested themselves in starting night classes in instruction for working women, did not think of regarding their work as a civic movement. Blankenburg chaired the Committee on Education of the New Century Club. The beginning consisted of three or four classes held in the building of the New Century Club. Blankenburg had studied bookkeeping and she became the teacher in that department. She assisted in planning the cooking class, and for coordinating the financing for the adjunct organization, the New Century Guild, an organization composed of working women, to be fostered and helped by the parent association until it could stand alone.

In 1892, she was elected President of the Pennsylvania Woman Suffrage Association, which office she held until 1908. A great deal of Blankenburg's work was done directly in behalf of women. One of her first efforts was to get a representation of women on the Board of Education. She succeeded in having Anna Hallowell elected, and later Mary Mumford, and Philadelphia schools benefited by the work of these two educational experts. In 1895, a committee of the Pennsylvania Woman's Suffrage Association, of which Blankenburg was President, secured a law which provided that a married woman who contributed to the support of her children should have an equal right to the custody and care of the minor children. Before this time, the State of Pennsylvania gave this right to the mother only when the father had been proved a drunkard or worthless or had failed to provide for his family. For years, she workedg for the passage of a law which would protect a childless widow equally with a childless widower. At the time, the law was such that a childless widow inherited one-half the personal estate and the use of one-half the real estate of her deceased husband, while the childless widower got all the personal and the use of all the real estate.

Blankenburg was a member of the committee of women who inaugurated the system of police matrons in Philadelphia. The committee was a voluntary one; it had no authority and received no compensation. It did have the entree to station houses and it equipped the first matron's department. Through its efforts, four police matrons were appointed as an experiment. The four matrons were greatly assisted by the committee members. They visited the stations frequently, found clothing, homes and jobs for some of the unfortunate women and generally made the innovation so successful that the police matron became a part of the police system. As a member of the Woman's Health Protective Association, Blankenburg ably assisted in "pushing along" movements to secure trolley fenders, vestibules on trolley cars and sand filtration of water.

In 1903, Blankenburg opened an active campaign against the smoke nuisance. Philadelphia had city ordinances and State laws. But Philadelphia continued to be smoky and dirty. Blankenburg organised a committee to try to persuade the offenders to stop. The committee did everything it could up to the point of the defective legislation. It persuaded and coaxed and forced, and Philadelphia began to be cleaner. In her own district, Blankenburg got up a petition, secured the signatures of several hundred householders and sent it to the offending firms. One firm immediately changed its fuel and put in smoke consumers; a second reduced the number of smokestacks. In order to raise money to continue the campaign and to carry it to Harrisburg, Pennsylvania for better laws on the smoke nuisance, Blankenburg sent out a printed notice asking for contributions.

In 1904, Blankenburg was a delegate from Philadelphia to the Second Conference of the International Woman Suffrage Alliance held in Berlin, and made an address on the legal condition of women in the United States. Blankenburg was a member of the Good Citizens' Club, as well as a member of the Woman's City Party during its lifetime and she worked hard in this connection. In her own district, she was a member of the Tenth Ward Woman's City Improvement Society, and if the residents of the Tenth Ward were unaware of the vital facts concerning their ward and city it was not because of Blankenburg. Very painstakingly and carefully, she wrote a series of Civic Bulletins labelled: "Do You Know the Tenth Ward?" "City Housekeeping," " City Fathers," etc. These bulletins were little primers. They asked every conceivable question about the ward and the city—how many voters there are, how many schools, how many churches, what are the methods of city government, the powers vested in the mayor and council. They were in the simplest English and delivered to every householder as a budget of valuable information.

=== 1911 and later ===
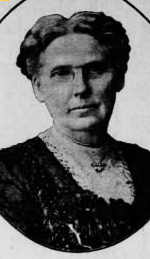

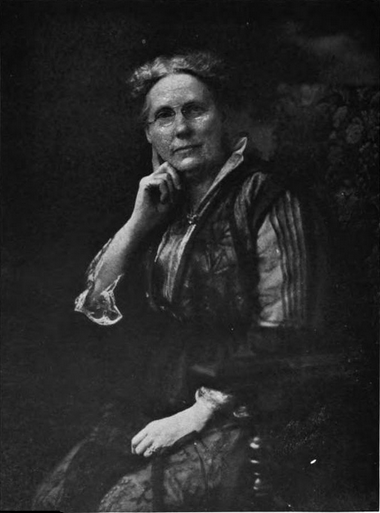

Rudolph Blankenburg was elected mayor of Philadelphia in 1911. He was a leader in all the reform political movements in Philadelphia in his day. Together, the Blankenburgs worked for the things that uplift humanity, that make for cleaner politics, and for better citizenship. From then, the life of the Blankenburgs was busier than ever. She was made a vice-president of the Patrons' Section of the National Education Association and First Vice-President of the General Federation of Women's Clubs. At first, she was deluged with letters asking for positions. When the people found that she had no positions to give, they began asking assistance. Several asked her assistance in selecting wives, and one asked for help in burying a dead cat. There were hundreds of senseless letters, and there were a great many requests for interviews and innumerable telephone calls.

Blankenburg believed in women's clubs and in the motto "Unity in Diversity." She gave her loyal support to her own city clubs, the Pennsylvania Federation of Women's Clubs, and the General Federation of Women's Clubs since their inception. She held many club offices in Philadelphia and Pennsylvania, and was an honored guest and speaker at many of the local club reunions and banquets. In religion, Blankenburg was a member of the Society of Friends. In 1914, with Marie Jenney Howe of New York City, Blankenburg joined a feminist campaign waged against "labelling" married women by their husband's names. The movement was for the purpose of permitting married women to retain their maiden name and eliminating the prefix "Mrs". In this connection she said:— "I am a member of the Society of Friends and the women Friends always have used their own names after marriage. I use my own name. For all business purposes, I am 'Lucretia Longshore Blankenburg'. But for social purposes, if I were sending out invitations, for instance, I might send them out in the name of 'Mrs. Rudolph Blankenburg'."

== Personal life ==
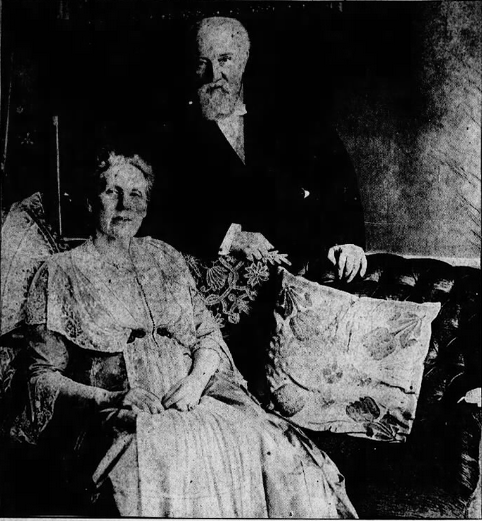
50th wedding anniversary, 1917

Despite the years given to public service, the Blankenburg business and the Blankenburg fortune increased. But there was little change in the home. The Quaker touch was plainly seen in its comfortable, unostentatious furnishings. Blankenburg managed her own household affairs, planned her dinners, cooked them herself, and made her own dresses. The household was not troubled by social ambitions.

Lucretia and Rudolph married on April 18, 1867, in a Quaker ceremony before then-mayor Morton McMichael. They moved to the home of Lucretia's parents, Mr. and Dr. Longshore, at 1326 Arch Street. In 1894 they bought a house at 214 West Logan Square and moved there, along with Lucretia's parents. In 1916, they were ordered by the City to vacate this house so that the entire block could be demolished for the expansion of the Benjamin Franklin Parkway, in accordance with an ordinance passed in May, 1915, by the city council. On April 12, 1918, Rudolph died at the couple's home at 138 West Walnut Lane in the city's Germantown neighborhood.

In their time in the Longshore home on Arch Street, Lucretia and Rudolph had three children, all daughters, but none survived to adulthood. The first, Emma, died in infancy. The second, Marian, lived longer, and the third, Julia, died in her thirteenth year.

Blankenburg had been ill with pneumonia for three days before she died, March 28, 1937, in her apartment in the Bellevue-Stratford in Philadelphia. She was buried in the city's Fair Hill Burial Ground.

== Selected works ==
- Pennsylvania law concerning women, 189?
- The Blankenburgs of Philadelphia, 1928 (biography of her husband; autobiography)
