= Anna Longshore Potts =

American physician (1829–1912)

Anna Longshore Potts M.D.
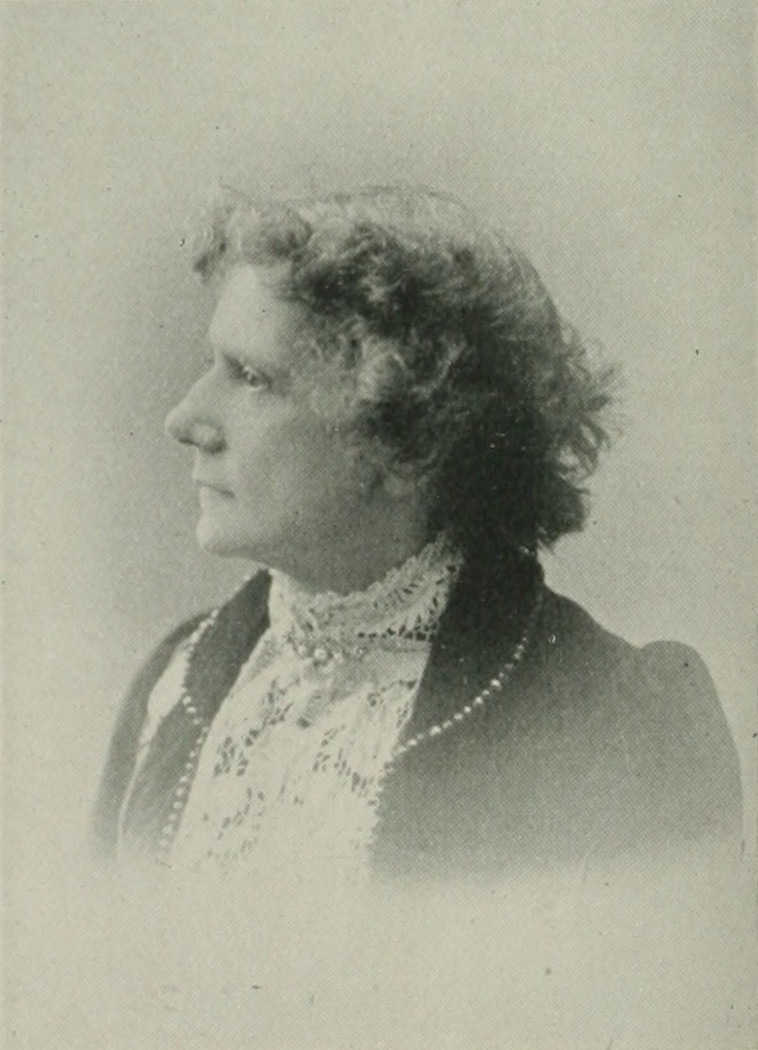
- "A Woman of the Century"
- Born: Anna Mary Longshore; April 16, 1829; Attleboro, Bucks County, Pennsylvania, U.S.
- Died: October 24, 1912 (aged 83); San Diego, California, U.S.
- Education: Woman's Medical College of Pennsylvania
- Known for: lectures
- Spouse: Lambert Hibbs Potts (m. 1857)
- Children: 1
- Relatives: Lucretia Longshore Blankenburg; Hannah Longshore
- Scientific career
- Fields: women's health
- Workplaces: Paradise Hotel and Sanitarium

Signature
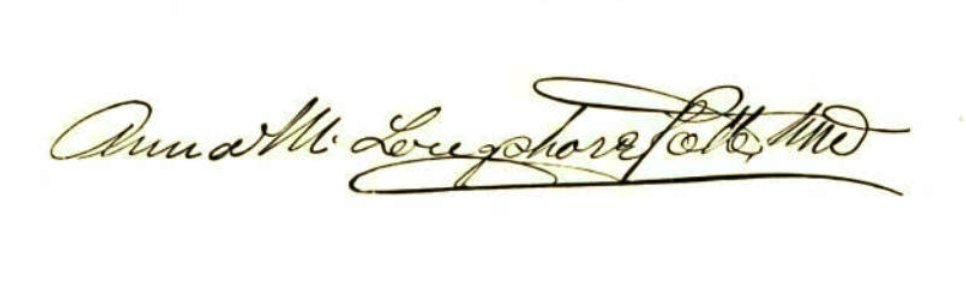

Anna Mary Longshore Potts (née Longshore; April 16, 1829 – October 24, 1912) was an American physician and medical lecturer of the long nineteenth century. She was one of eight members of the first graduating class of the Woman's Medical College of Pennsylvania in Philadelphia. She practiced in Philadelphia for a few years after her graduation, then for five years in Adrian, Michigan. Thereafter, she made a tour of the Pacific coast and elsewhere in the United States as well as New Zealand, Australia, and England on the prevention of sickness. She traveled around the world twice and gained a reputation as an author and lecturer. Her lifework was a crusade against ignorance and prejudice; as she said, a "diffusion of physiological knowledge would not only tend to prevent disease, but would also be a potent factor in the preservation of morality". Potts belonged to numerous clubs.

== Early life and education ==
Anna Mary Longshore was born in Attleboro (now Langhorne), in Bucks County, Pennsylvania, on April 16, 1829. Her parents were Abram and Rhoda Longshore. Anna's siblings included brothers Cary Longshore, Isaac S. Longshore, Thomas Ellwood Longshore, and Dr. Joseph S. Longshore, and at least one sister, Elizabeth Longshore Burgess.

In 1852, at the age of 22, Potts graduated from the Woman's Medical College of Pennsylvania in Philadelphia, as one of eight students in the college's first graduating class. One of her classmates, Hannah Longshore, married Potts' brother Thomas and became the mother of Potts' niece Lucretia Longshore Blankenburg.

== Career ==
After earning a medical degree from the Woman's Medical College of Pennsylvania in 1852, Potts opened a lucrative medical practice in Philadelphia. Her health became impaired, and in 1857, she returned to her hometown of Langhorne, where she married a merchant, Lambert Hibbs Potts (b. 1831). They had a son, Emerson.

A few years later, Dr. Longshore, now Dr. Longshore-Potts, moved to Adrian, Michigan, where she quickly rose to a high position in her profession. She became imbued with the belief that a physician's most sacred duty is to prevent rather than cure disease, and to that end, she gave many private lectures to her patients. The ability of those talks led to her giving a course of public lectures, the meeting being called by the mayor, leading physicians and clergymen. That was in 1876. Her addresses were so favorably received that she concluded to devote all her time to them. She commenced first in small towns, with a boy as agent, who engaged churches and wrote with crayon in blank spaces the place and time of the meetings. Her success was continuous and, as she traveled out into larger towns, became almost phenomenal. The first city of any consequence which she visited as a lecturer was San Francisco, where she appeared in 1881. She then visited the principal coast towns, north as far as Seattle, Washington and south to San Diego, California.

In May, 1883, she sailed with her party, then consisting of seven, for New Zealand, where, from Auckland to Invercargill, the largest houses were packed to listen to Potts. In November, 1883, she stood before an audience of 4,500 people in the exhibition building, Sydney, New South Wales, where she was introduced by Charles A. Kahlothen, U.S. Consul. The proportions of her enterprise may be judged from the fact that her party had been increased to nine people, and it cost her US$450 to rent the chairs necessary to seat that building for five lectures. She received a greeting there which was repeated in Melbourne, Brisbane, and the larger interior towns of the colonies.

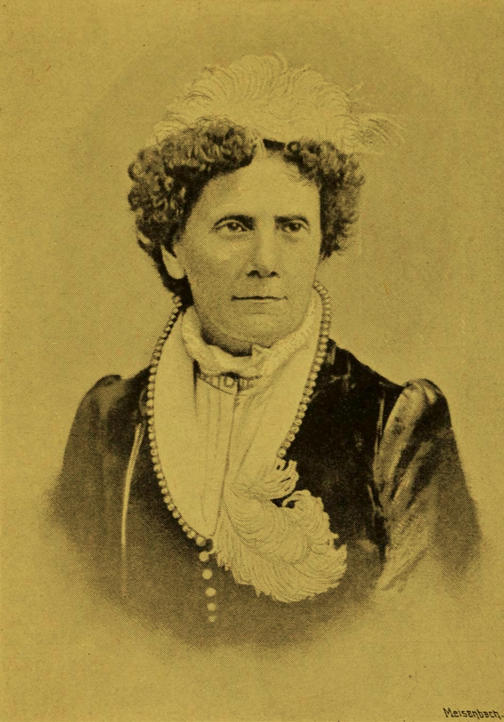
(1887)

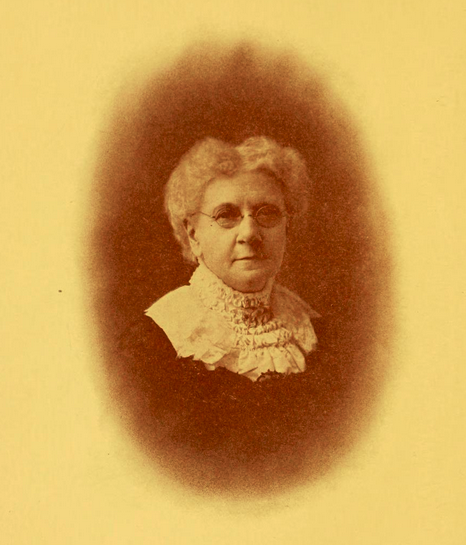
(1911)

In November, 1884, she sailed for London, England, where she delivered her first lecture in the large St James's Hall, on February 17, 1885, where Edwin Atkins Merritt, then U.S. Consul-General, presented her to an audience of 3,500 people. Lady Claude Hamilton placed her mansion in Portland Place at Potts' disposal, and between her lectures, which continued for five months, and her receptions in the Hamilton mansion, she stirred London. Every daily paper and all the leading weeklies accorded her praise. She gave one course of lectures for the benefit of the woman's hospital in Soho Square. Many leading charities received substantial aid from her. She spent nearly three years in the U.K., lecturing in all the chief provincial cities and repeating her lectures in London at frequent intervals.

In October, 1887, she returned to the United States, making her first appearance in Tremont Temple, Boston. She then appeared in Chickering Hall, in New York City, and from there went to California, lecturing only in the large cities. Just five years from the time she sailed for the Antipodes, she stood before an audience in the Baldwin Theater, San Francisco, that packed that building. Before her departure from the U.S., she purchased 20 acres (8.1 ha) of wild land near San Diego, and during her absence, she had it converted into a garden, in the center of which was erected a beautiful house of three stories, costing upwards of US$40,000, an institution that became a public monument to her brother, Dr. Joseph Longshore, who was the most active in obtaining the charter for her alma mater.

After her return to the U.S., in 1889, she established the Paradise Hotel and Sanitarium in National City, California. She also visited all the large cities in the country. In January, 1890, the close of her lectures in the Grand Opera House, Indianapolis, Indiana, was marked by an unusual scene. The large audience of women rose and greeted her with prolonged cheers, and a committee presented her with an elegant testimonial engrossed on parchment and signed by Caroline Scott Harrison, Eliza Hendricks, May Wright Sewall, Mary Harrison McKee, Governor Alvin Peterson Hovey and many members of the State Senate and House of Representatives, and when she returned there two months later, the common council placed the use of Tomlinson Hall at her disposal without charge.

Discourses to women on medical subjects (1887)

Love, courtship and marriage (1891)

The logic of a lifetime (1911)

Potts published three books, Discourses to women on medical subjects (1887), Love, courtship and marriage (1891), and The logic of a lifetime (1911). The last of these was a volume of essays self-published at Alameda, California. According to a review in Light (1911):— "It consists of more than 60 brief papers in essay form ranging over many subjects, useful and educative, although at times, a trifle declamatory. Various passages in the book show that the author is in full sympathy with the great harmonising conception of a life beyond, and she writes with conviction of the soul's eventual entrance into another sphere."

== Death ==
Anna Mary Longshore Potts died in San Diego, California, on October 24, 1912 at the age of 83. At the time of her death, she was believed to have been the last surviving member of the first graduating class of the Women's Medical College of Philadelphia.

== Selected works ==
- Discourses to women on medical subjects, 1887
- Love, courtship and marriage, 1891
- The logic of a lifetime, 1911
