= Longshore Sailing School =

School in Westport, Connecticut

Coordinates: 41.10821°N 73.3679°W

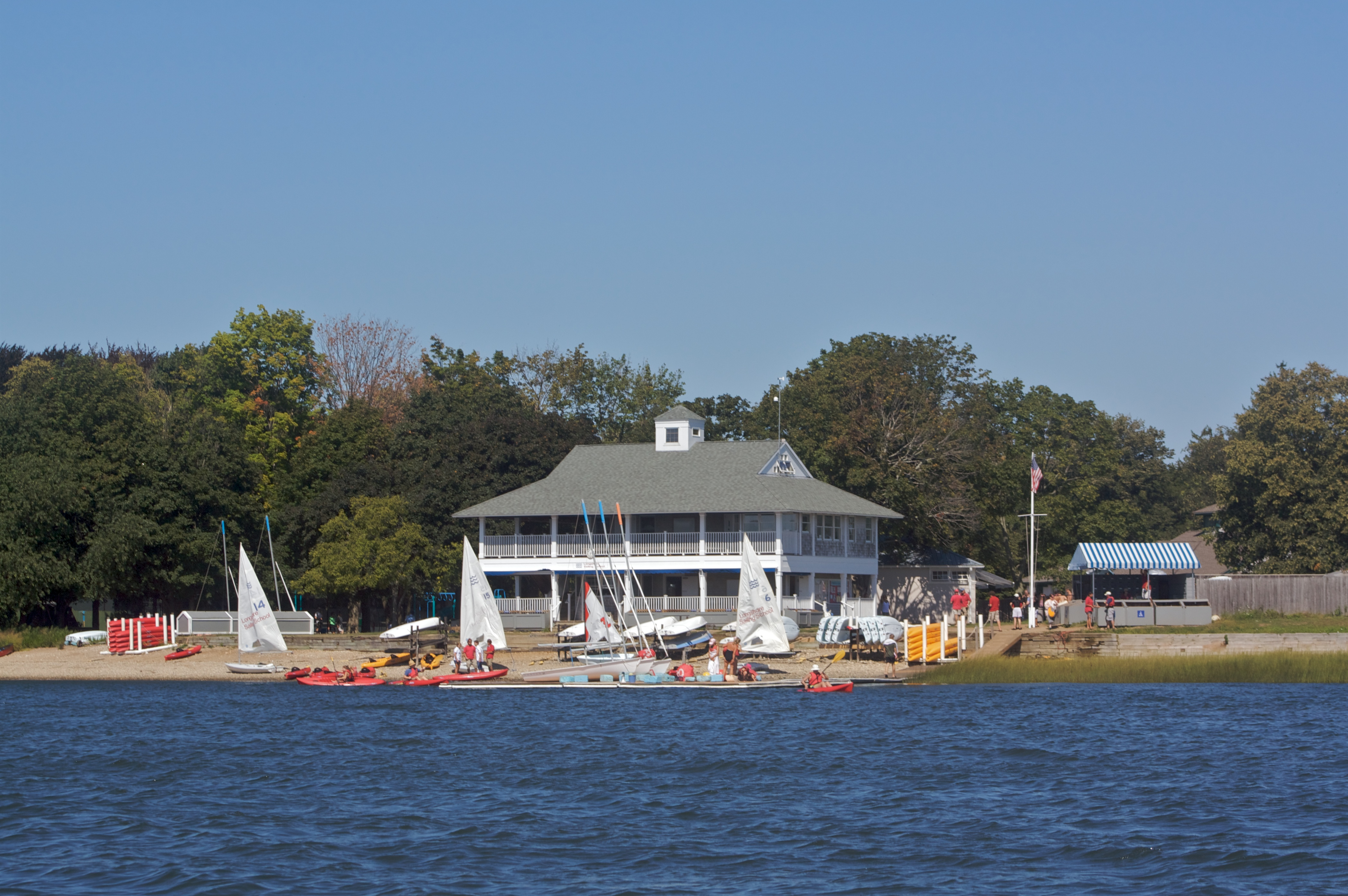
Photograph of the school from just offshore

Longshore Sailing School is a public facility in Westport, Connecticut that teaches sailing and paddling. It is "among the oldest and most renowned sailing programs in the country" and has earned "the country's most prestigious sail training awards".

Longshore was founded in 1960 by the Town of Westport Recreation Commission. In 1975, it changed to private operation. In 2017, Jane Pimentel became the owner/operator.

Longshore provides sailing courses for children from ages 8 through 16. It also offers Adult programs in sailing. The school's staff includes US Sailing–certified Instructors and Instructor Trainers, as well as USCG-licensed Masters.

Longshore rents its fleet of approximately 200 sailboats, kayaks, and stand-up paddleboards to the public.

== Sources ==
- Full Sail for the 45th Season
- "SCUTTLEBUTT #430 - November 1, 1999". Archived from the original on 2006-10-17.
