= Tall Timbers Natural Area =

Natural area in Pennsylvania

- Location within Pennsylvania
- Location: Snyder County, Pennsylvania
- Nearest town: Troxelville
- Coordinates: 40°48′09″N 77°18′37″W
- Area: 660 acres (270 ha)

Tall Timbers Natural Area (sometimes called Tall Timber Natural Area) is a 660-acre (270 ha) protected area in Snyder County, Pennsylvania, United States. It is part of Bald Eagle State Forest.

== Description ==
The Natural Area was established to protect a tract of second-growth oak, white pine, and hemlock trees. The area has been described as a home for several bird species that are uncommon in the region. Some old-growth trees survived the Pennsylvania logging era and represent the character of the region's forests before they were largely clearcut in the late 19th Century.

The area is adjacent to Snyder-Middleswarth Natural Area, which is immediately to the east, and it has been noted for its scenic fall foliage.
