= Snyder-Middleswarth Natural Area =

Natural area in Pennsylvania

- IUCN category III (natural monument or feature)
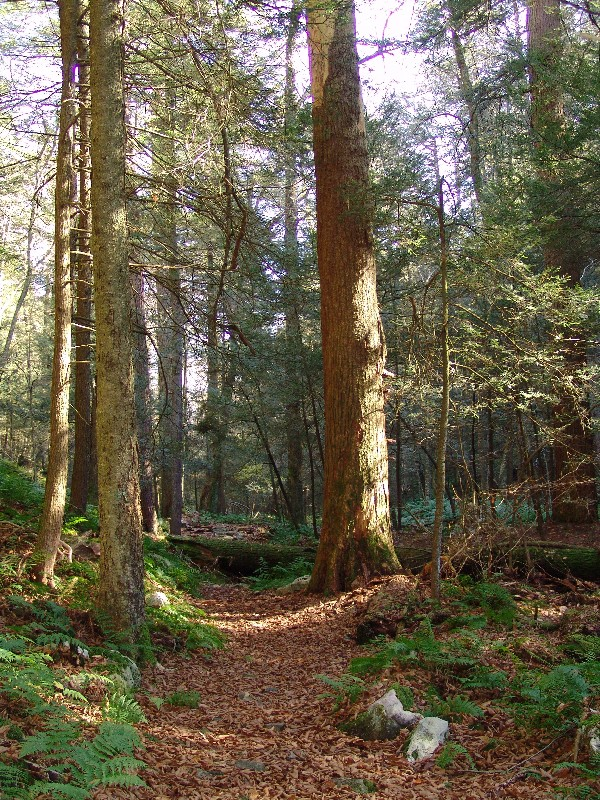
- Relict virgin forest within Snyder-Middleswarth Natural Area

- Location within Pennsylvania
- Location: Snyder County, Pennsylvania
- Nearest town: Troxelville
- Coordinates: 40°48′36″N 77°16′59″W
- Area: 500 acres (200 ha)
- Elevation: 1,329 ft (405 m)
- Established: 1921
- Named for: Simon Snyder and Ner Alexander Middleswarth
- Governing body: Pennsylvania Department of Conservation and Natural Resources
- Website: Snyder Middleswarth Natural Area

U.S. National Natural Landmark
- Designated: 1967

Snyder-Middleswarth Natural Area is a 500 acre (202 ha) National Natural Landmark within Bald Eagle State Forest in Spring Township, Snyder County, Pennsylvania in the United States. It is named for two Pennsylvania politicians from Snyder County: Simon Snyder and Ner Alexander Middleswarth. It was formerly a Pennsylvania state park and was the only one in Snyder County, but lost its state park status in the mid 1990s.

== Name ==
Snyder-Middleswarth Natural Area is named for two Pennsylvania politicians from Snyder County: Simon Snyder and Ner Alexander Middleswarth. Snyder County is also named for Simon Snyder.

Snyder (1759 – 1819) was a three-time Speaker of the Pennsylvania House of Representatives and the third governor of Pennsylvania. He was elected to the United States Senate, but died before he could take office. As of 2007 he remains the only Pennsylvania governor from Snyder County. Middleswarth (1783 – 1865) was twice Speaker of the Pennsylvania House, and served in the Pennsylvania State Senate and the United States House of Representatives.

The United States Geological Survey Geographic Names Information System (GNIS) lists the name as "Snyder Middleswarth Natural Area". As of 2023, the hyphen is used by the Pennsylvania Department of Conservation and Natural Resources, as well as the National Park Service in its entry for the National Natural Landmark.

== Location ==
Snyder-Middleswarth Natural Area is in Spring Township in western Snyder County, about 5 miles (8 km) west of Troxelville on Swift Run Road. It is 23 miles (37 km) southwest of Lewisburg and 31 miles (50 km) southeast of State College. The natural area is in the Ridge-and-valley Appalachians, in a narrow east-west valley between Jacks Mountain to the south and Buck and Penns Creek Mountains to the north. Swift Run, a tributary of Middle Creek, flows east through the area. The Rock Springs Picnic Area is at the eastern end of the preserve, with the Snyder-Middleswarth Picnic Area west of this, in about the center of the tract, just where Swift Run Road leaves Swift Run. Tall Timbers Natural Area is the western border, while Bald Eagle State Forest lands surround Snyder-Middleswarth Natural Area in all other directions.

== History ==
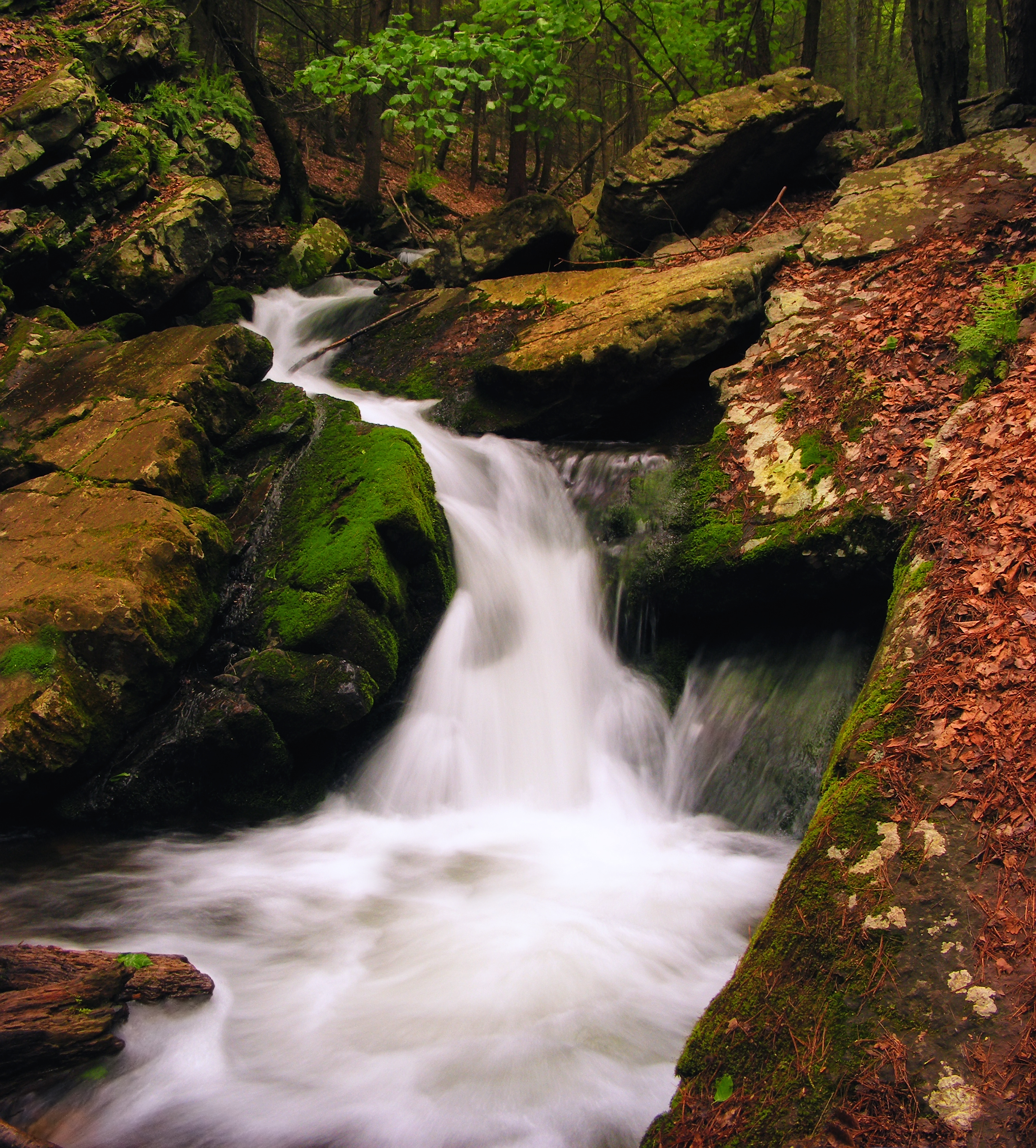
Swift Run in High Rock picnic area

In the 19th and early 20th centuries, almost all of Pennsylvania's forests were clear cut, with only a few isolated tracts of virgin forest surviving. The land that became Snyder-Middleswarth Natural Area was purchased by the state in 1902, as part of a larger 14,000 acre (56.66 km) parcel. On April 12, 1921 the governor signed the law creating "Snyder-Middleswarth State Forest Park", making it Pennsylvania's ninth state park. By 1923 the park had a telephone and some structures, and in 1937 the state named it a "Forest Monument" as an "area of botanical or historic interest". Early in the park's history a fire tower was built just west of it, but this was eventually abandoned and only the foundations remained by 1992.

Snyder-Middleswarth was still a "State Forest Park" on the official 1965 Pennsylvania Department of Highways Snyder County map. In November 1967, the park was named a National Natural Landmark, as an "outstanding example of a relict forest composed predominantly of hemlock, birch, and pine, with scattered oaks". In 1980 an airplane carrying the New York Times crashed with one fatality. The crash site is on the summit of Thick Mountain, on the southern edge of the park. By 1981, both the Snyder-Middleswarth and Tall Timbers Natural Areas had been established, the former as part of the state park and the latter as part of Bald Eagle State Forest. While both areas are on Swift Run, Tall Timbers is old second-growth forest. Snyder-Middleswarth's virgin forest is thought to have survived at least in part due to its location and the difficulty of transporting the cut timber, although the fact that many of the trees were brittle hemlock may also have preserved them.

Despite being Snyder County's only state park and a National Natural Landmark, Snyder-Middleswarth lost its status as a state park sometime between 1992 and 1996, becoming just a Natural Area within the state forest system. Sources differ as to the size of the former Snyder-Middleswarth State Park. As of December 2007, at least ten years after the park ceased to exist, the DCNR webpage "State Parks near the Bald Eagle State Forest" still lists Snyder-Middleswarth State Park, and gives its size as 425 acres (172 ha). However, Thwaites (1992) wrote that the park was only the 8 acre (3.2 ha) picnic area, but distinguished it from the "much larger Snyder Middleswarth National Natural Landmark" (without giving its exact size).

According to the DCNR, as of 2007 Snyder-Middleswarth Natural Area is 500 acres (202 ha), of which 250 acres (101 ha) is virgin forest. The tallest trees at Snyder-Middleswarth are more than 150 feet (46 m) tall and measure more than 40 inches (102 cm) diameter at breast height. As measured by its growth rings, one fallen tree was found to be 347 years old. The adjoining Tall Timbers Natural Area is 660 acres (267 ha), and has a "second growth forest of oak, white pine, hemlock, and hard pine".

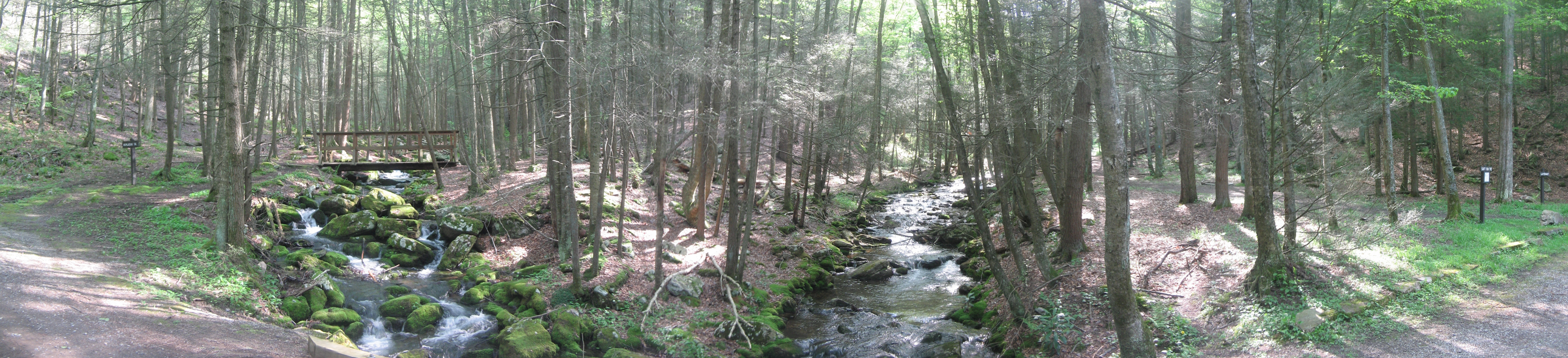
Panoramic view of two branches of Swift Run from the Snyder-Middleswarth picnic area parking lot bridge. The trailhead for the Hemlocks Trail is on the left by the footbridge, and the trailhead for the Swift Run Trail is on the right. Both lead through virgin forest along Swift Run.
