= Pennsylvania Route 235 =

State highway in Pennsylvania, US

Pennsylvania Route 235

Route information
- Maintained by PennDOT
- Length: 43.111 mi (69.380 km)

Major junctions
- South end: US 11 / US 15 in Liverpool
- PA 17 near Liverpool; PA 333 in East Salem; PA 35 in McAlisterville; US 522 in Beaver Springs
- North end: PA 45 near Laurelton

Location
- Country: United States
- State: Pennsylvania
- Counties: Perry, Juniata, Snyder, Union

Highway system
- Pennsylvania State Route System; Interstate; US; State; Scenic; Legislative
| ← PA 234 | → PA 236 |
| ← PA 886 | → PA 889 |
| ← PA 928 | → PA 930 |

Pennsylvania Route 235 (PA 235) is a 43-mile (69 km) state highway in Pennsylvania. PA 235's southern terminus is at U.S. Route 11 (US 11)/US 15 in Liverpool, and the northern terminus is at PA 45 near Laurelton.

== Route description ==
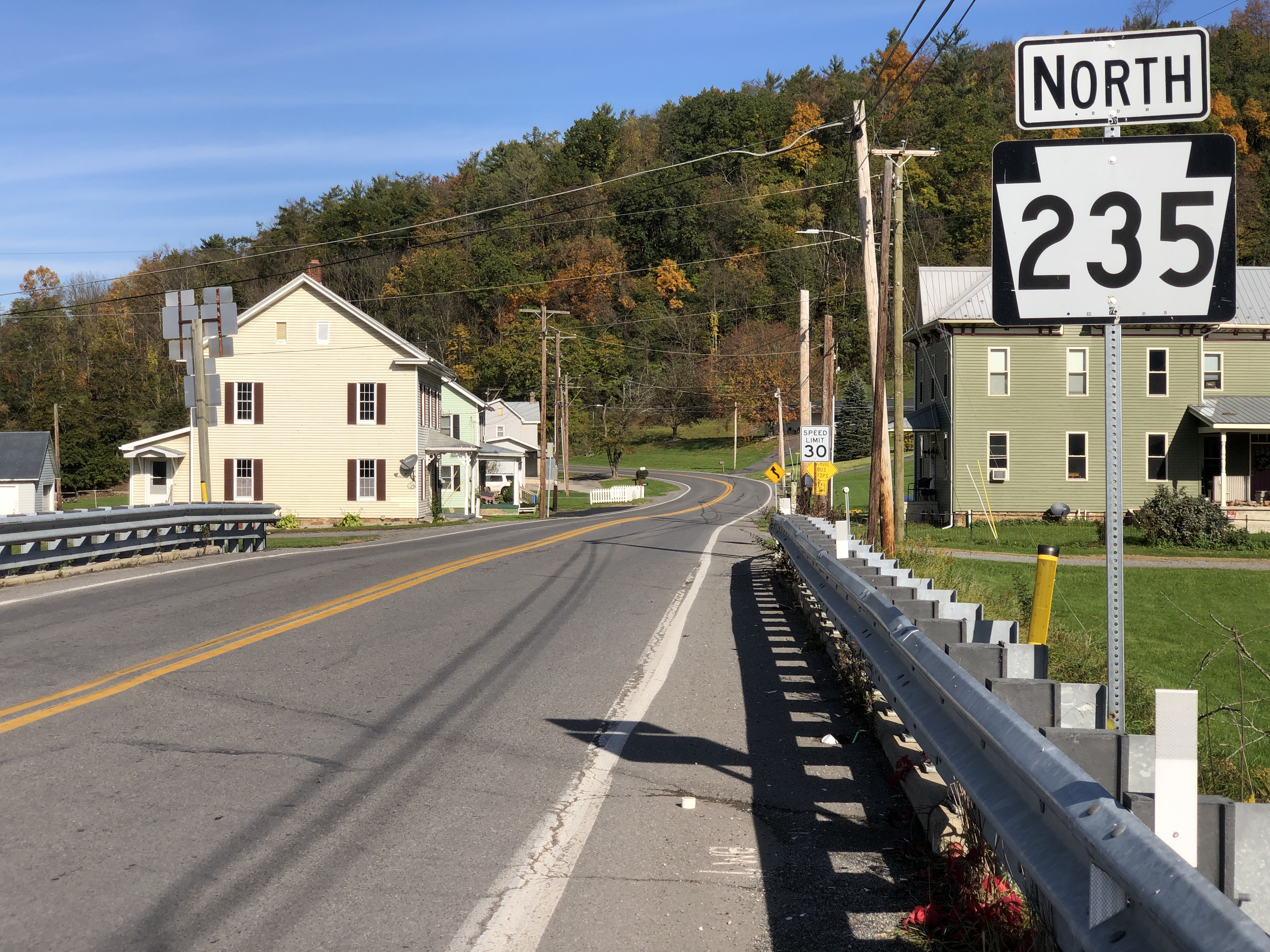
PA 235 northbound past US 522 in Beaver Springs

PA 235 officially begins at an intersection with US 11/US 15 in the borough of Liverpool in Perry County, heading north as an unsigned highway that is concurrent with PA 17. The road heads into Liverpool Township and runs through wooded areas with some fields. PA 17 splits to the west and PA 235 becomes a signed route, passing through woodland before heading into open agricultural areas with a few homes and turning west. At Pfouts Valley, the route turns to the north.

PA 235 crosses into Susquehanna Township in Juniata County and runs through a mix of farms and woods, turning to the west again. The road heads through agricultural areas with some woodland and residences, making a right turn to continue west. The route enters Greenwood Township and heads through more rural areas, turning northwest and passing through Seven Stars. PA 235 curves to the west again and continues into Delaware Township, where it heads through farms and woods with some residences, turning south and then west again to pass through Maze. Farther west, the route comes into the residential community of East Salem, where it turns north at an intersection with PA 333. The road heads back into agricultural areas with some woods, curving west again. PA 235 crosses into Fayette Township and becomes Westfall Street, turning north into open farmland. The route heads into the residential community of McAlisterville and intersects PA 35, at which point it turns northeast to join that route on an unnamed road. PA 235 splits from PA 35 by heading to the northwest, leaving the community and heading into more farmland. The route heads north into woodland with some fields and homes before entering forested areas. At this point, the road crosses Shade Mountain and heads to the northeast.

PA 235 heads into West Beaver Township in Snyder County and continues through more forests, turning north. The road heads northeast again and crosses into Spring Township, where it heads north again. The route continues northeast into a mix of farmland and woodland with some homes, reaching an intersection with US 522. At this point, PA 235 turns northeast to form a concurrency with US 522 on Beaver Avenue, heading into Beaver Springs, where it passes homes and businesses. PA 235 splits from US 522 by turning north onto an unnamed road, passing rural homes. The road passes through a gap in a wooded ridge and winds north through agricultural areas with occasional trees and homes. The route passes through Benfer and continues north into Adams Township, heading through more rural areas. In the residential community of Troxelville, PA 235 turns to the northeast before making another turn to the north. The route heads through farmland with some homes prior to heading into forested areas and ascending Penns Creek Mountain. The road turns northeast into Bald Eagle State Forest before making another curve to the north.

PA 235 crosses into Hartley Township in Union County and winds across the summit of the mountain before descending it to the north, leaving the Bald Eagle State Forest. The road curves northwest and crosses Penns Creek, heading into the community of Glen Iron. Here, the route turns east before curving north and heading through a mix of farmland, woodland, and homes. PA 235 turns east and then north through rural residential areas, passing through Laurelton. The route heads through more woodland with some fields and homes, turning northwest and ending at PA 45.

== History ==
In 1946, PA 235 absorbed both PA 888 and PA 929.

== Major intersections ==
| County | Location | mi | km | Destinations | Notes |
|---|---|---|---|---|---|
| Perry | Liverpool | 0.000 | 0.000 | US 11 / US 15 (Susquehanna Trail) – Selinsgrove, Williamsport, Harrisburg | South end of PA 17 concurrency, southern terminus of PA 235 |
| Perry | Liverpool | 1.670 | 2.688 | PA 17 west – Millerstown | North end of PA 17 concurrency, southern terminus of PA 235 signage |
| Juniata | Delaware Township | 15.967 | 25.696 | PA 333 west – Thompsontown | Eastern terminus of PA 333 |
| Juniata | Fayette Township | 19.454 | 31.308 | PA 35 south (Main Street) / School Street – Mifflintown | South end of PA 35 concurrency |
| Juniata | Fayette Township | 19.592 | 31.530 | PA 35 north (Main Street) / Beaver Street – Selinsgrove | North end of PA 35 concurrency |
| Snyder | Spring Township | 28.702 | 46.191 | US 522 south – Lewistown | South end of US 522 concurrency |
| Snyder | Spring Township | 29.575 | 47.596 | US 522 north / Pine Street – Middleburg | South end of US 522 concurrency |
| Union | Hartley Township | 43.111 | 69.380 | PA 45 (Old Turnpike Road) – State College, Lewisburg | Northern terminus of PA 235 |
1.000 mi = 1.609 km; 1.000 km = 0.621 mi: Concurrency terminus
