= Pennsylvania Route 333 =

State highway in Pennsylvania, US

Pennsylvania Route 333

Route information
- Maintained by PennDOT
- Length: 31.148 mi (50.128 km)

Major junctions
- West end: PA 103 in Juniata Terrace
- PA 35 in Mifflin; PA 75 in Port Royal; US 22 / US 322 in Thompsontown
- East end: PA 235 near Thompsontown

Location
- Country: United States
- State: Pennsylvania
- Counties: Mifflin, Juniata

Highway system
- Pennsylvania State Route System; Interstate; US; State; Scenic; Legislative
← PA 332	→ PA 334

Pennsylvania Route 333 (PA 333) is a 31-mile-long (50 km) state highway located in Mifflin and Juniata counties in Pennsylvania. The western terminus is at PA 103 in Juniata Terrace. The eastern terminus is at PA 235 near Thompsontown.

== Route description ==
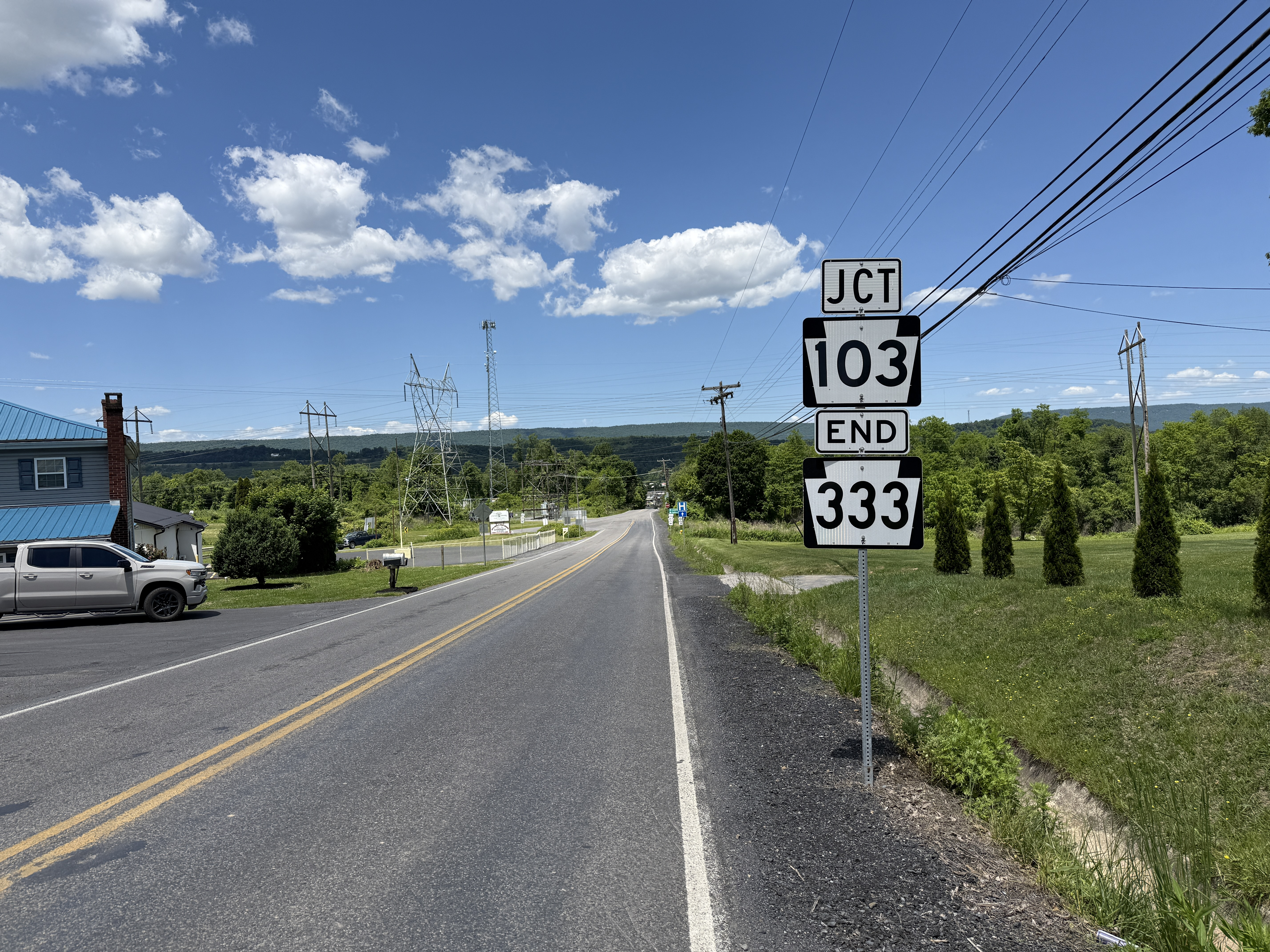
PA 333 westbound approaching its terminus at PA 103 in Granville Township

PA 333 begins at an intersection with PA 103 in Granville Township, Mifflin County, heading southeast on two-lane undivided Hawstone Road. The road passes homes, turning northeast and heading through rural areas of residences before turning southeast again and running a short distance to the southwest of Norfolk Southern's Pittsburgh Line and the Juniata River. PA 333 continues east and then northeast alongside the railroad line and the river as it runs along the base of forested Blue Mountain, passing through Shawnee and Hawstone.

The route continues into Milford Township, Juniata County and becomes an unnamed road as it continues through forests, turning south before making a hairpin turn to the north. The road resumes southeast again and passes through Denholm before heading into a mix of farmland and woodland with some homes. PA 333 turns south through more forested areas of homes, crossing into the borough of Mifflin. At this point, the route heads east briefly on Valley Street before turning south onto Mowery Street, passing more homes. PA 333 comes to an intersection with PA 35 and turns west to form a concurrency with that route on Wilson Street, soon turning south back into Milford Township and becoming an unnamed road.

The road heads west through areas of woods and farms with some development, with PA 333 splitting from PA 35 by heading to the south. The route winds through agricultural areas farther from the river before curving southeast into forested areas with some fields and homes, becoming West Licking Street. PA 333 becomes the border between Milford Township to the west and the borough of Port Royal to the east as it reaches an intersection with PA 75. Here, the route turns south to join PA 75 on Market Street, crossing the Tuscarora Creek into Turbett Township.

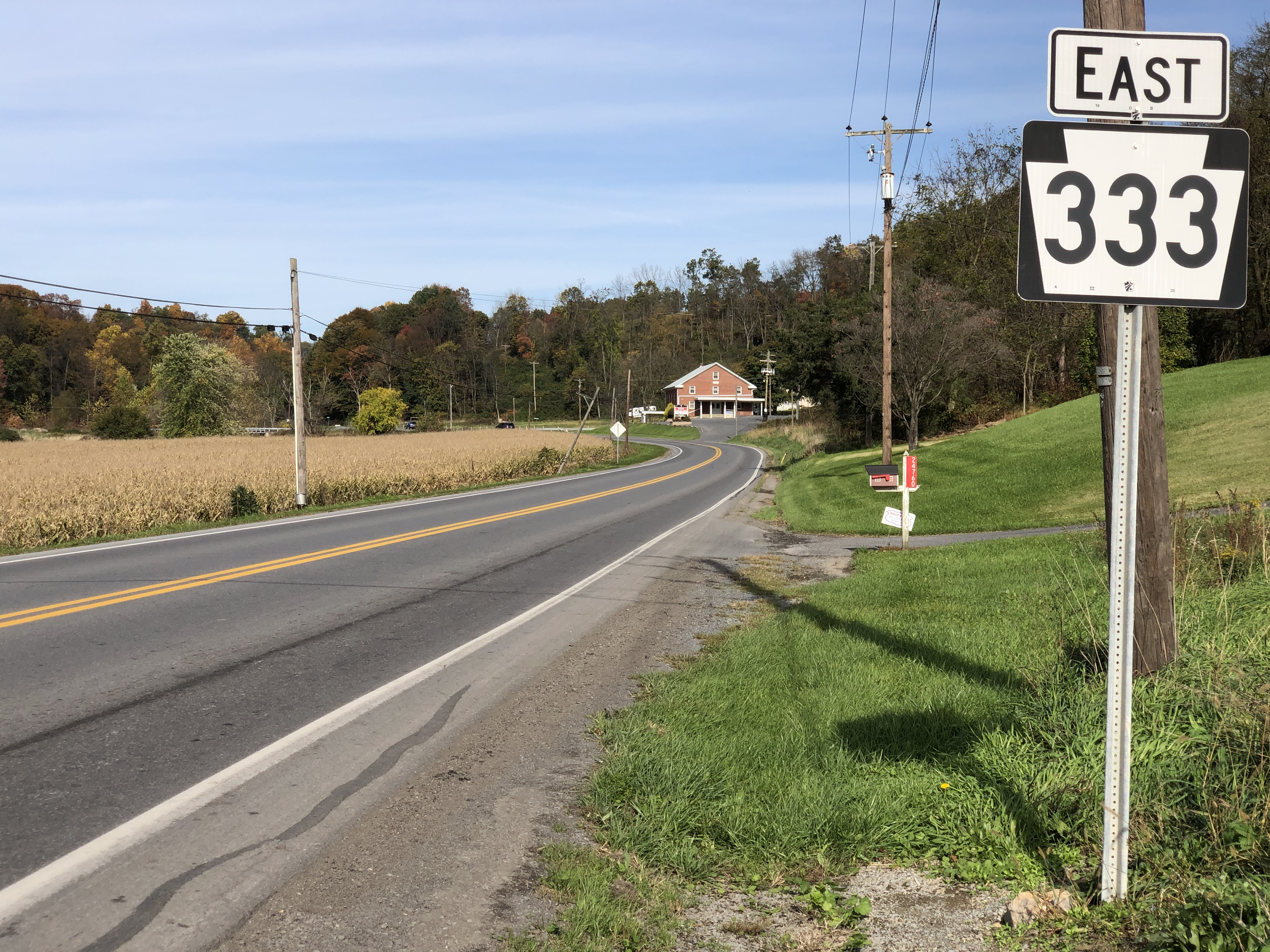
PA 333 eastbound in Delaware Township

PA 333 splits from PA 75 in Old Port by heading to the southeast on an unnamed road. The route runs through areas of farms and woods before curving east into open farmland. The road heads northeast before turning southeast and making a few curves. PA 333 heads east again and passes through Tuscarora and crosses into Walker Township, running to the south of the Pittsburgh Line and the Juniata River again as it runs through forested areas along the base of Tuscarora Mountain. Continuing between the river and the mountain, the route passes through Vandyke and heads into Delaware Township. In Thompsontown Station, the road curves north and crosses over the Pittsburgh Line and the Juniata River.

PA 333 heads through a mix of farmland and woodland before coming into the borough of Thompsontown and passing homes on Mill Street. The route turns east onto East Main Street and runs through residential and business areas. PA 333 turns north onto an unnamed four-lane divided highway and reaches an interchange with the U.S. Route 22 (US 22)/US 322 freeway. At this point, the route crosses back into Delaware Township and becomes a two-lane undivided road again, winding north through forested areas. PA 333 runs north through farmland with some woods and homes before ending at PA 235 in East Salem, with the road continuing north as part of PA 235.

== Major intersections ==
County	Location	mi	km	Destinations	Notes
Mifflin	Granville Township	0.000	0.000	PA 103 – Lewistown, Mattawana	Western terminus
Juniata	Mifflin	12.858	20.693	PA 35 north (Wilson Street) to US 22 / US 322 – Mifflintown	West end of PA 35 overlap
Juniata	Milford Township	13.402	21.568	PA 35 south – Walnut, Shade Gap	East end of PA 35 overlap
Juniata	Port Royal	16.347	26.308	PA 75 north (Market Street) – Port Royal	West end of PA 75 overlap
Juniata	Turbett Township	16.604	26.722	PA 75 south – Spruce Hill, Ickesburg, Fort Loudon	East end of PA 75 overlap
Juniata	Thompsontown	27.845– 28.179	44.812– 45.350	US 22 / US 322 – Lewistown, Harrisburg	Interchange
Juniata	Delaware Township	31.148	50.128	PA 235 – McAlisterville, Seven Stars, Liverpool	Eastern terminus
1.000 mi = 1.609 km; 1.000 km = 0.621 mi: Concurrency terminus
