= Laurelton =

Laurelton may refer to:

- Laurelton, Queens, New York City
- Laurelton, New Jersey
- Laurelton, Pennsylvania
- Laurelton Hall, Long Island, New York
