= East Salem, Pennsylvania =

Unincorporated community in Pennsylvania, US

- Census-designated place
- Location within Pennsylvania Location within the United States
- Coordinates: 40°36′31″N 77°14′13″W
- Country: United States
- State: Pennsylvania
- County: Juniata
- Township: Delaware

Area
  - Total: 0.27 sq mi (0.69 km^{2})
  - Land: 0.27 sq mi (0.69 km^{2})
  - Water: 0 sq mi (0.00 km^{2})
- Elevation: 607 ft (185 m)

Population (2020)
  - Total: 169
  - Density: 631.5/sq mi (243.82/km^{2})
- Time zone: UTC-5 (Eastern (EST))
  - Summer (DST): UTC-4 (EDT)
- ZIP code: 17059
- FIPS code: 42-21792
- GNIS feature ID: 2584453

East Salem is an unincorporated community and census-designated place in Delaware Township, Juniata County, Pennsylvania, United States. It is located at the junction of Pennsylvania Routes 333 and 235, 4 miles (6 km) north of the borough of Thompsontown. As of the 2010 census, the population was 186.

== Demographics ==
Historical population
Census	Pop.	Note	%±
2020	169		—
U.S. Decennial Census
