= USS LST-850 =

1944 LST-542-class tank landing ship

History

United States
- Laid down: 15 August 1944
- Launched: 3 November 1944
- Commissioned: 3 November 1944
- Decommissioned: 18 January 1947
- Stricken: 1 November 1958
- Honors and awards: one battle star for World War II service
- Fate: Sunk as a target

General characteristics
- Displacement: 1,625 tons (light), 3,640 tons (full)
- Length: 328 ft (100 m)
- Beam: 50 ft (15 m)
- Draft: Bow 2'-4", stern 7'-6" (unloaded); bow 8'-2", stern 14'-1" (unloaded)
- Propulsion: Two General Motors 12-567 diesel engines, two shafts, twin rudders
- Speed: 12 knots
- Test depth: 8' fwd; 14'-4" aft (full load)
- Boats & landing craft carried: Two LCVPs
- Capacity: Approximately 130 officers and enlisted men
- Complement: 8-10 officers, 89-100 enlisted men
- Armament: One single 3 in (76 mm) gun mount, eight 40 mm guns, twelve 20 mm guns

USS LST-850 was an LST-542-class tank landing ship built for the United States Navy during World War II. Late in her career, she was renamed Juniata County (LST-850)—after Juniata County, Pennsylvania, the only U.S. Naval vessel to bear the name—but never saw active service under that name.

Originally laid down as LST-850 by the Chicago Bridge & Iron Company of Seneca, Illinois 15 August 1944; launched 3 November 1944; sponsored by Mrs. Mildred Margaret Tegge Honig; and commissioned at New Orleans, Louisiana 27 November 1944. After shakedown off the coast of Florida, LST-850 loaded military cargo at Gulfport, Mississippi and departed New Orleans for the Pacific 31 December. Steaming via the Panama Canal and San Diego, she reached Pearl Harbor 1 February 1945. On 20 February she sailed with five other landing ships for the Solomons, arriving Guadalcanal 7 March. After loading a cargo of LVTs, she departed 19 March, touched at Eniwetok 25 March, and reached Guam the 31st. There she unloaded her cargo before steaming to Saipan 3 April to prepare to support operations at Okinawa. Between 12 April and 14 April, LST-850 embarked Seabees and loaded construction and combat equipment; then she departed 20 April for that strategic island, which lay at the gateway to the heart of the Japanese Empire. Arriving 27 April, she discharged troops and cargo despite intermittent enemy air attacks. From 7 to 13 May she returned to Saipan where she embarked 371 officers and men of the 2nd Marine Division and loaded a cargo of LTVs. Sailing 24 May, she arrived Okinawa 30 May. On 3 June, and again on 9 June, she carried these veterans of the Pacific fighting for amphibious assaults against Iheya Shima and Aguni Shima. Departing in convoy 18 June, she reached Saipan the 24th; and, after embarking Seabees at Guam, she returned to Okinawa 28 July. Sailing once more for the Marianas 8 August, she arrived Saipan 14 August as Japan accepted Allied peace terms and agreed to surrender.

Assigned to transport occupation forces to Japan, LST-850 steamed via Leyte to Manila Bay, Luzon, where she embarked Army troops and departed in convoy for Japan. She entered Tokyo Bay 11 September and discharged her troops. Departing Tokyo early in October, during the next month she returned to Luzon, embarked additional troops, and carried them to Yokohama where she arrived 4 November. After supporting occupation landings along the coast of Honshū, she sailed in mid-November for the United States. She sailed via Saipan and Pearl Harbor and arrived Astoria, Oregon 30 December. LST-850 operated out of Astoria during the next 10 months and then was placed in commission, in reserve 17 May 1946. She transferred to Portland in October, decommissioned 18 January 1947, and entered the Pacific Reserve Fleet. While berthed in the Columbia River, she was named USS Juniata County (LST-850) 1 July 1955. She was recommended for use as a target to destruction 20 October 1958. Her name was struck from the Naval Vessel Register 1 November 1958.
