= Fayette Township, Pennsylvania =

Township in Pennsylvania, US

Coordinates: 40°37′00″N 77°16′59″W

- Township
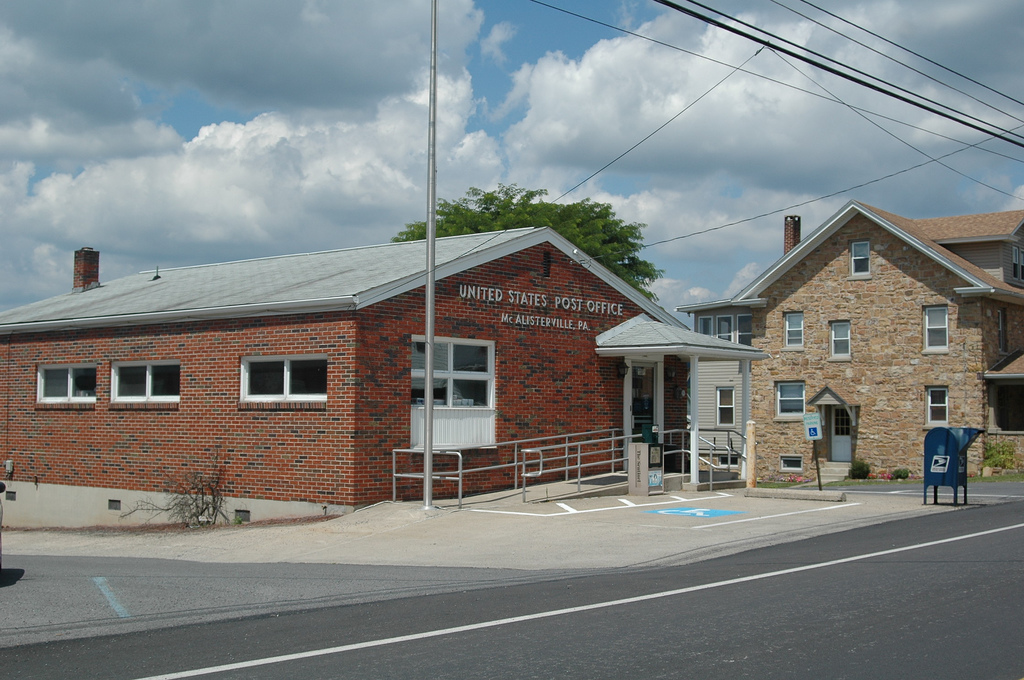
- The post office in McAlisterville

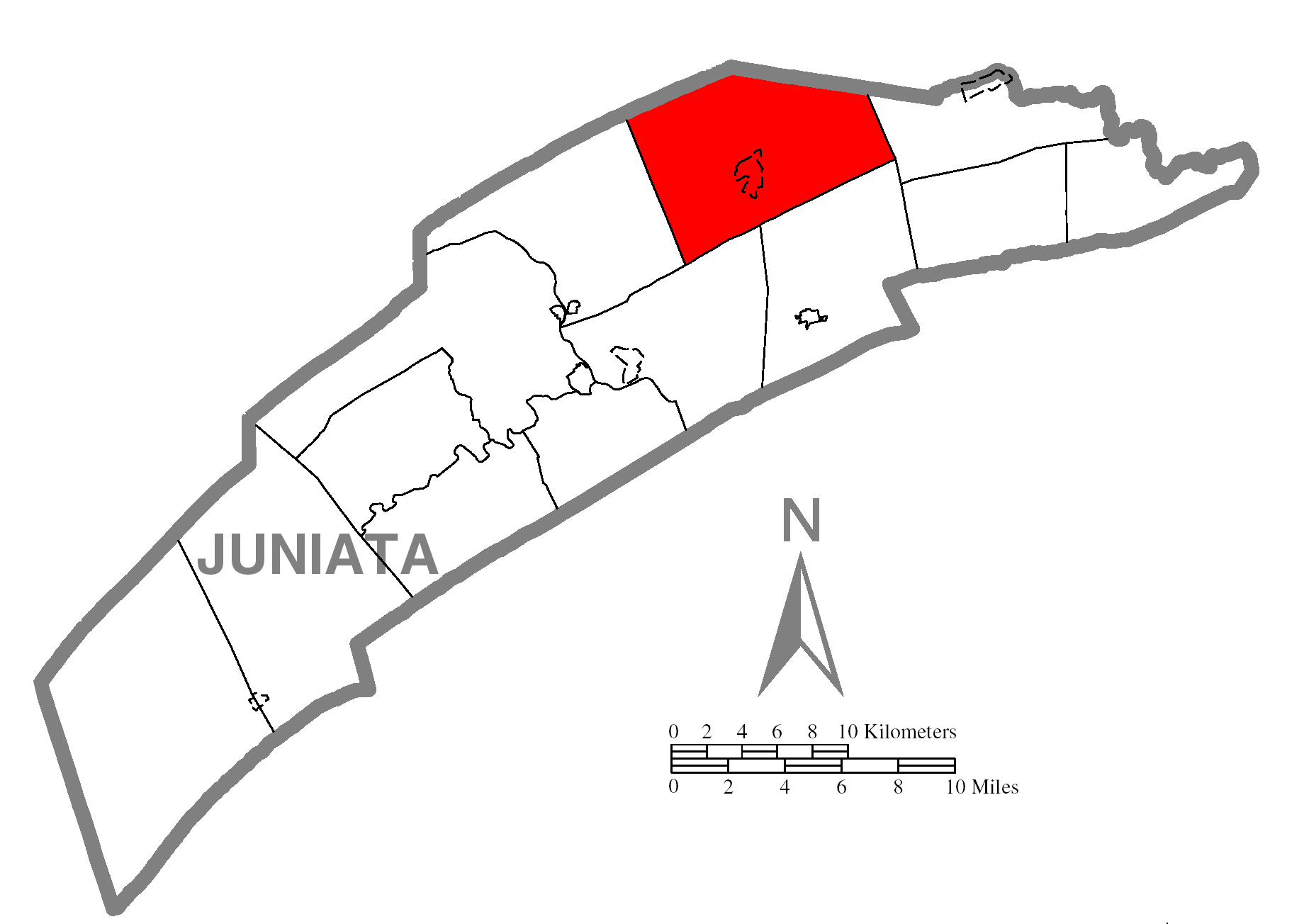
- Map of Juniata County, Pennsylvania highlighting Fayette Township

- Map of Juniata County, Pennsylvania
- Country: United States
- State: Pennsylvania
- County: Juniata
- Settled: 1755
- Incorporated: 1834

Area
  - Total: 40.04 sq mi (103.70 km^{2})
  - Land: 40.04 sq mi (103.70 km^{2})
  - Water: 0 sq mi (0.00 km^{2})
- Elevation: 650 ft (200 m)

Population (2020)
  - Total: 3,339 ▼
  - Estimate (2022): 3,311
  - Density: 88.2/sq mi (34.04/km^{2})
- Time zone: UTC-5 (EST)
  - Summer (DST): UTC-4 (EDT)
- ZIP Codes: 17049 (McAlisterville); 17076 (Oakland Mills)
- Area code: 717
- FIPS code: 42-067-25440
- Website: https://fayettetownship.com/

Fayette Township is a township in Juniata County, Pennsylvania, United States. The population was 3,339 at the 2020 census.

== Geography ==
According to the United States Census Bureau, the township has a total area of 40.0 square miles (103.7 km^{2}), all land. It is bordered by Mifflin and Snyder Counties to the north, Monroe Township to the east, Delaware and Walker Townships to the south and Fermanagh Township to the west. The primary unincorporated community in the township is McAlisterville, located near the center of the township. Other communities in the township are Oakland Mills in the west, and Swales, Bunkertown, and Cocolamus in the east.

The northern boundary of the township follows the crest of Shade Mountain. Pennsylvania Route 35 passes through the center of the township from southwest to northeast, and Pennsylvania Route 235 crosses it in McAlisterville.

== Demographics ==
Historical population
Census	Pop.	Note	%±
1850	1,550		—
1860	2,006		29.4%
1870	2,051		2.2%
1880	2,028		−1.1%
1890	1,755		−13.5%
1900	1,634		−6.9%
1910	1,466		−10.3%
1920	1,446		−1.4%
1930	1,501		3.8%
1940	1,733		15.5%
1950	1,730		−0.2%
1960	1,917		10.8%
1970	2,165		12.9%
1980	2,679		23.7%
1990	3,002		12.1%
2000	3,252		8.3%
2010	3,478		6.9%
2020	3,339		−4.0%
2022 (est.)	3,311		−0.8%
U.S. Decennial Census

As of the census of 2000, there were 3,252 people, 1,219 households, and 936 families residing in the township. The population density was 81.8 inhabitants per square mile (31.6/km^{2}). There were 1,372 housing units at an average density of 34.5 per square mile (13.3/km^{2}). The racial makeup of the township was 98.77% White, 0.34% African American, 0.06% Native American, 0.12% Asian, 0.15% Pacific Islander, 0.28% from other races, and 0.28% from two or more races. Hispanic or Latino of any race were 0.71% of the population.

There were 1,219 households, out of which 33.9% had children under the age of 18 living with them, 67.4% were married couples living together, 5.8% had a female householder with no husband present, and 23.2% were non-families. 20.5% of all households were made up of individuals, and 10.2% had someone living alone who was 65 years of age or older. The average household size was 2.67 and the average family size was 3.08.

In the township the population was spread out, with 27.3% under the age of 18, 8.0% from 18 to 24, 27.7% from 25 to 44, 23.0% from 45 to 64, and 14.0% who were 65 years of age or older. The median age was 36 years. For every 100 females, there were 100.2 males. For every 100 females age 18 and over, there were 96.4 males.

The median income for a household in the township was $30,653, and the median income for a family was $35,884. Males had a median income of $29,679 versus $21,362 for females. The per capita income for the township was $16,548. About 7.0% of families and 9.5% of the population were below the poverty line, including 11.7% of those under age 18 and 5.2% of those age 65 or over.

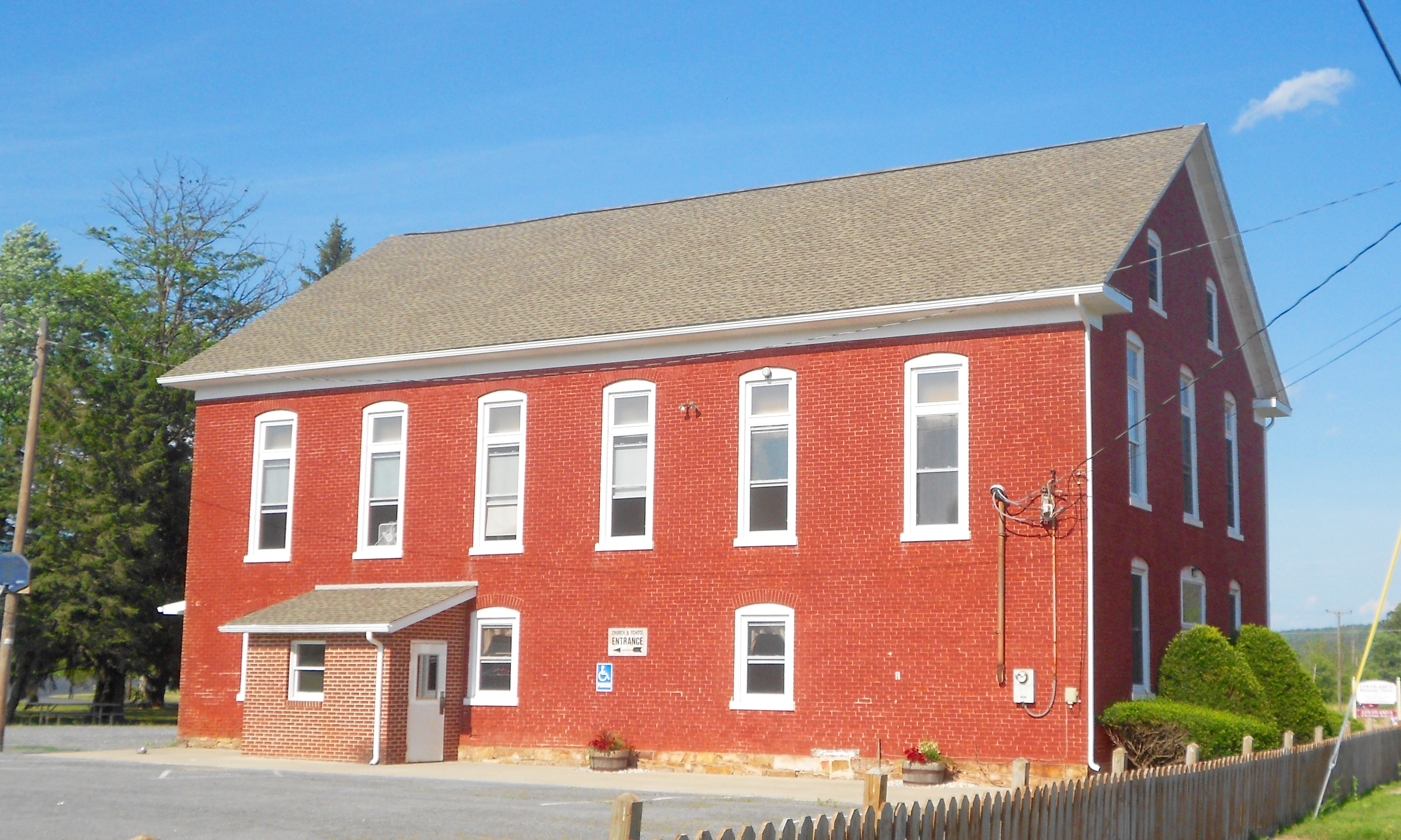
Cocolamus Mennonite Church in Bunkertown
