= Academia Pomeroy Covered Bridge =

- U.S. National Register of Historic Places
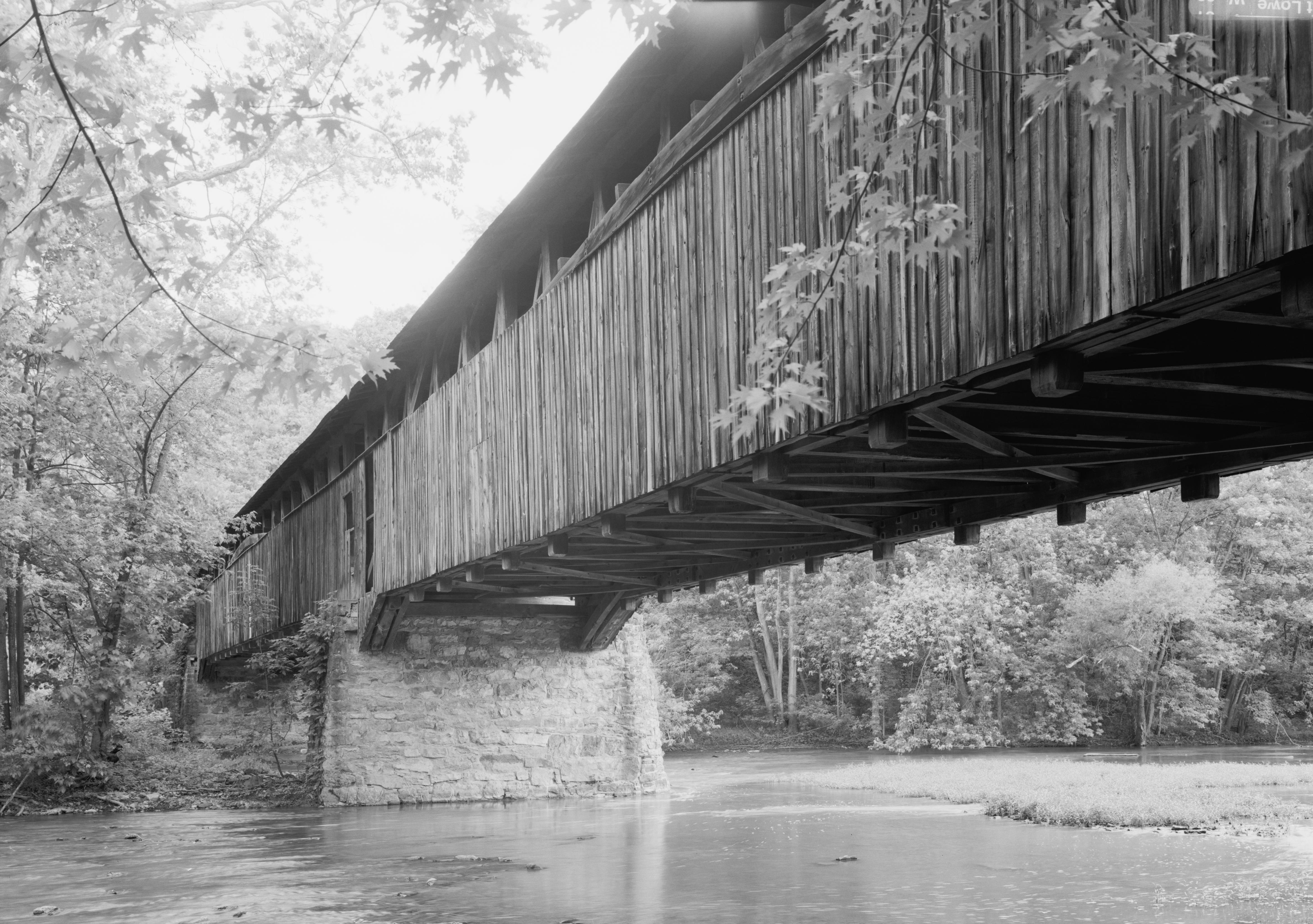
- Academia Bridge in 2005

- Location within Pennsylvania Location within the United States
- Location: Northwest of Spruce Hill, Spruce Hill and Beale Township, Pennsylvania
- Coordinates: 40°29′37″N 77°28′21″W
- Built: 1902
- Architect: James M. Groninger
- MPS: Covered Bridges of Juniata and Snyder Counties TR
- NRHP reference No.: 79002249
- Added to NRHP: August 10, 1980

The Academia Pomeroy Covered Bridge at 278-foot-long (85 m) (portal to portal) is the longest remaining covered bridge in Pennsylvania.

Built in 1902, this single-lane, double-span wooden covered bridge crosses Tuscarora Creek between Spruce Hill and Beale Townships, in Juniata County. Its design is based on the Burr truss developed by Theodore Burr, who was the preeminent bridge designer and builder of his time. The bridge has been owned by the Juniata County Historical Society, located in Mifflintown, since 1962.

It was listed on the National Register of Historic Places in 1979. The bridge is located about a mile east of the Tuscarora Academy, which is also listed on the National Register.

== See also ==
- List of bridges documented by the Historic American Engineering Record in Pennsylvania
