= Oakland Mills, Pennsylvania =

Unincorporated community in Pennsylvania, US

- Unincorporated community
- Location within Pennsylvania Location within the United States
- Coordinates: 40°36′52″N 77°19′01″W
- Country: United States
- State: Pennsylvania
- County: Juniata
- Township: Fayette
- Elevation: 574 ft (175 m)
- Time zone: UTC-5 (Eastern (EST))
  - Summer (DST): UTC-4 (EDT)
- ZIP code: 17076
- Area codes: 223 & 717
- GNIS feature ID: 1182834

Oakland Mills is an unincorporated community in Juniata County, Pennsylvania, United States. The community is located along Pennsylvania Route 35 in Fayette Township, 5.2 miles (8.4 km) northeast of Mifflintown. Oakland Mills has a post office with ZIP code 17076.
