= Lost Creek (Pennsylvania) =

Tributary of Juniata River, Pennsylvania, US

Coordinates: 40.619939°N 77.309487°W

Lost Creek is a 17.5-mile-long (28.2 km) tributary of the Juniata River in central Pennsylvania in the United States.

Lost Creek joins the Juniata River at the community of Cuba Mills in Juniata County.

== See also ==
- List of rivers of Pennsylvania
