= Maze, Pennsylvania =

Unincorporated community in Pennsylvania, US

- Unincorporated community
- Location within Pennsylvania Location within the United States
- Coordinates: 40°36′44″N 77°11′44″W
- Country: United States
- State: Pennsylvania
- County: Juniata
- Township: Delaware Township
- Elevation: 600 ft (180 m)
- Time zone: UTC-5 (Eastern (EST))
  - Summer (DST): UTC-4 (EDT)
- GNIS feature ID: 1180589

Maze is an unincorporated community in Delaware Township, Juniata County, Pennsylvania, United States.
