= Laurelton, Pennsylvania =

Unincorporated community in Pennsylvania, US

Coordinates: 40°52′59″N 77°11′55″W

- Census-designated place
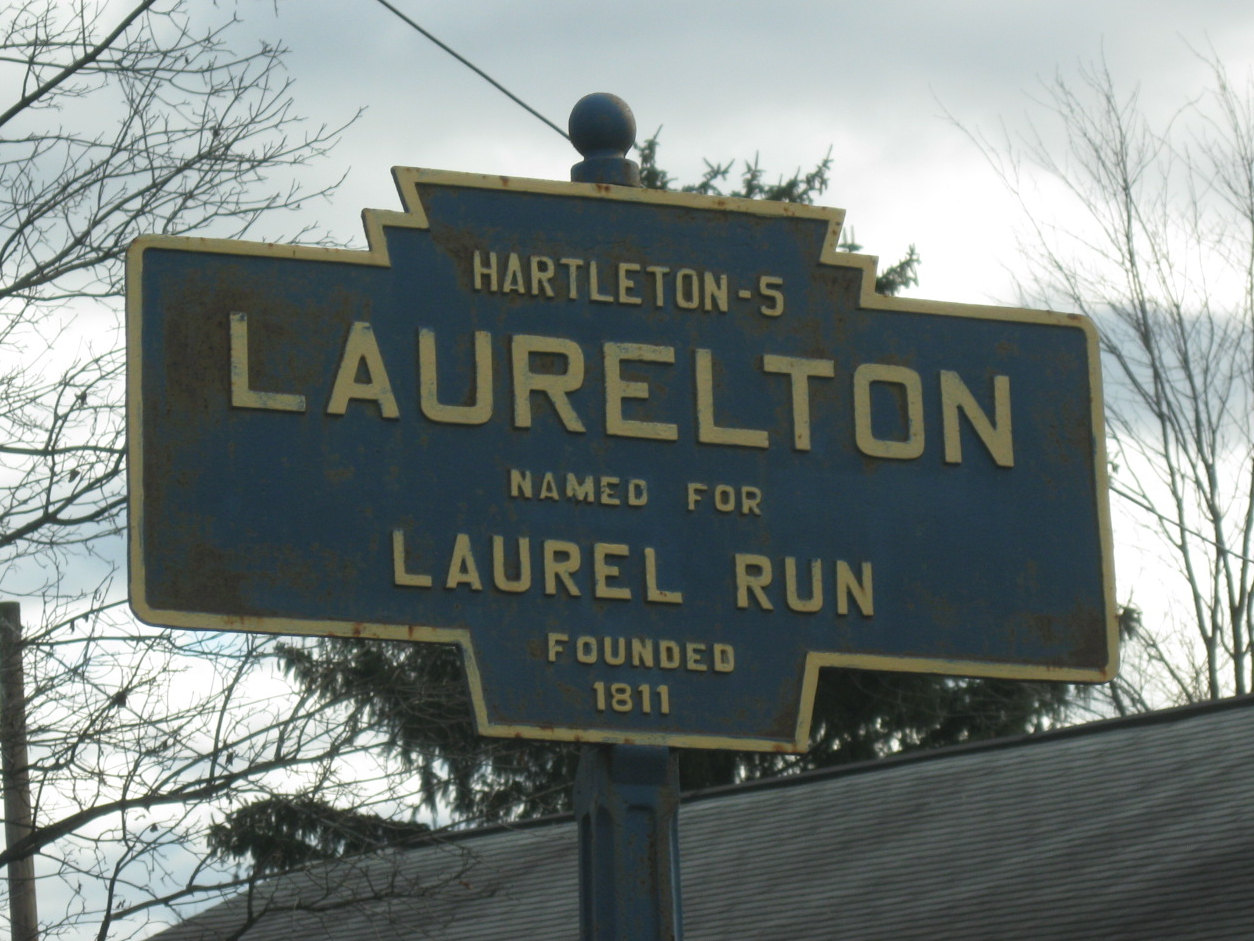
- Keystone Marker
- Interactive map of Laurelton, Pennsylvania
- Country: United States
- State: Pennsylvania
- County: Union
- Township: Hartley

Area
  - Total: 0.57 sq mi (1.48 km^{2})
  - Land: 0.57 sq mi (1.48 km^{2})
  - Water: 0 sq mi (0.00 km^{2})

Population (2020)
  - Total: 217
  - Density: 380.4/sq mi (146.89/km^{2})
- Time zone: UTC-5 (Eastern (EST))
  - Summer (DST): UTC-4 (EDT)
- FIPS code: 42-41856

Laurelton is a census-designated place located in Hartley Township, Union County in the state of Pennsylvania. It is located in western Union County along Pennsylvania Route 235. As of the 2010 census the population was 221 residents.

The Pennsylvania Village for Feeble Minded Women, later called the Laurelton State Village was an asylum for women began operations nearby in 1920, eventually housing about one thousand patients.

== Demographics ==
Historical population
Census	Pop.	Note	%±
2020	217		—
U.S. Decennial Census

== Education ==
It is in the Mifflinburg Area School District.
