= Tuscarora Creek (Juniata River tributary) =

River in Pennsylvania, US

Coordinates: 40.5325°N 77.3805°W

Tuscarora Creek is a 49.2-mile-long (79.2 km) tributary of the Juniata River in central Pennsylvania in the United States. It rises in eastern Huntingdon County, east of the borough of Shade Gap, and flows northeast between Tuscarora Mountain and Shade Mountain, reaching the Juniata River at Port Royal in Juniata County.

It is traversed by the Academia Pomeroy Covered Bridge, which at 278 feet (85 m) portal to portal is the longest remaining covered bridge in Pennsylvania. The bridge spans Tuscarora Creek between Spruce Hill and Beale townships. It is listed on the National Register of Historic Places and has been owned by the Juniata County Historical Society since 1962.

== See also ==
- List of rivers of Pennsylvania
