= Juniata County, Pennsylvania =

County in Pennsylvania, United States

- County
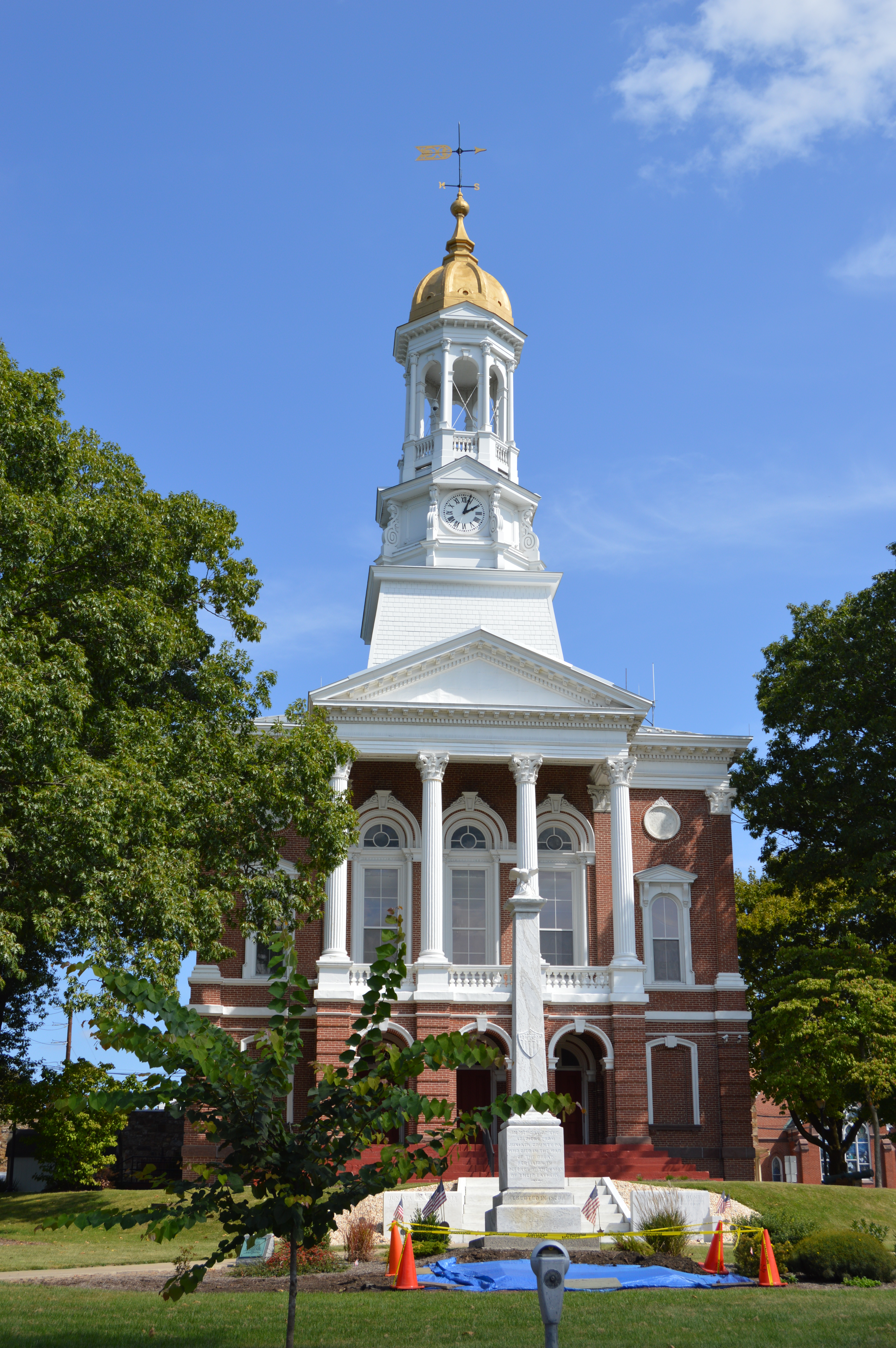
- Juniata County Courthouse in Mifflintown

- Location within the U.S. state of Pennsylvania
- Coordinates: 40°32′N 77°24′W
- Country: United States
- State: Pennsylvania
- Founded: March 2, 1831
- Named for: Juniata River
- Seat: Mifflintown
- Largest borough: Port Royal

Area
  - Total: 394 sq mi (1,020 km^{2})
  - Land: 391 sq mi (1,010 km^{2})
  - Water: 2.2 sq mi (5.7 km^{2}) 0.6%

Population (2020)
  - Total: 23,509
  - Estimate (2025): 23,403 ▼
  - Density: 60/sq mi (23/km^{2})
- Time zone: UTC−5 (Eastern)
  - Summer (DST): UTC−4 (EDT)
- Congressional district: 13th
- Website: www.juniataco.org

Juniata County is a county in the Commonwealth of Pennsylvania. As of the 2020 census, the population was 23,509. Its county seat is Mifflintown. The county was created on March 2, 1831, from part of Mifflin County and named for the Juniata River. The county is part of the Central region of the commonwealth. (Note: Includes Centre, Lycoming, Northumberland, Columbia, Mifflin, Union, Snyder, Clinton, Juniata and Montour Counties)

Mountains in Juniata County include Tuscarora Mountain and Shade Mountain. Agricultural land and forested land make up most of the county's area. Major rivers and creeks in the county include the Susquehanna River, the Juniata River, Tuscarora Creek, and West Branch Mahantango Creek. It borders seven other counties. The county lies over 16 different rock formations (which are from the Ordovician, Silurian, and Devonian) and 51 different soils.

Juniata County has a relatively low population density. The most population-dense parts of the county are the boroughs of Mifflintown and Mifflin. The main roads in Juniata County are Pennsylvania Route 235, Pennsylvania Route 35, Pennsylvania Route 104, U.S. Route 11/U.S. Route 15, U.S. Route 22/U.S. Route 322, Pennsylvania Route 74, Pennsylvania Route 850, and Pennsylvania Route 333.

The county has four boroughs and thirteen townships, and is served by two school districts: the Juniata County School District and Greenwood School District. There are five areas that are protected by the Central Pennsylvania Conservancy and 59 natural heritage sites in the county.

The first European settlers arrived in Juniata County in the 1750s. The county has historically been part of Mifflin County and before that, part of Cumberland County.

== History ==
Juniata County was historically a part of Cumberland County and later Mifflin County. Juniata County was formed on March 2, 1831, from parts of Mifflin County. It is named after the Juniata River. The word "juniata" itself is a Seneca word that means either "people of the standing stone" or "blue waters". The first boroughs in the county to be settled were Mifflintown and Thompsontown, which were settled in 1790. Port Royal and Mifflin were settled in 1812 and 1848, respectively. The first of these boroughs to be incorporated was Mifflintown, on March 6, 1833, and the last was Thompsontown, on February 7, 1868. However, the first settlers (unauthorized squatters) arrived in the county and were removed from it considerably earlier, by 1750. One of the first warrants for land in the county was issued in 1755. Many of the earliest landowners in Delaware Township were speculators as opposed to settlers. There was an Indian raid in the county in 1755 and 1756, although Fort Bingham and Fort Peterson had been constructed. The Beale family was one of the earliest families to inhabit the county. More settlers arrived in the 1750s and 1760s and the first gristmill on the western side of the Juniata River was built in the county in 1767. A public road was built in the county between Tuscarora Creek and a location near Shade Mountain in 1768. John Hamilton constructed a sawmill and gristmill on Cocolamus Creek in Delaware Township in 1776. The first known physician in the county, Dr. Ezra Doty, settled in Mifflintown in 1791.

The first four townships in what would become Juniata County were formed on October 23, 1754. They were Lack Township, Aire Township, Fannett Township, and Tyrone Township. These early townships had no formal boundaries. By 1913, the original townships had been divided into a total of 13 townships.

The Pennsylvania Canal began serving Juniata County in 1826 and closed in 1900. The Pennsylvania Railroad reached the county in the late 1840s. The Tuscarora Valley Railroad was also in the county until it closed in 1934.

During Hurricane Agnes in 1972, a total of 6374 acres of Juniata County were flooded. 57 families were displaced during this flooding.

Juniata County was the last county in Pennsylvania to develop a modern comprehensive plan. It did, however, construct a comprehensive plan in 1974.

In a 1997 survey, 66.8% of respondents found Juniata County a "very desirable" living place. In a similar survey in 2007, however, only 56.9% of respondents found the county a "very desirable" living place.

=== Historic places ===
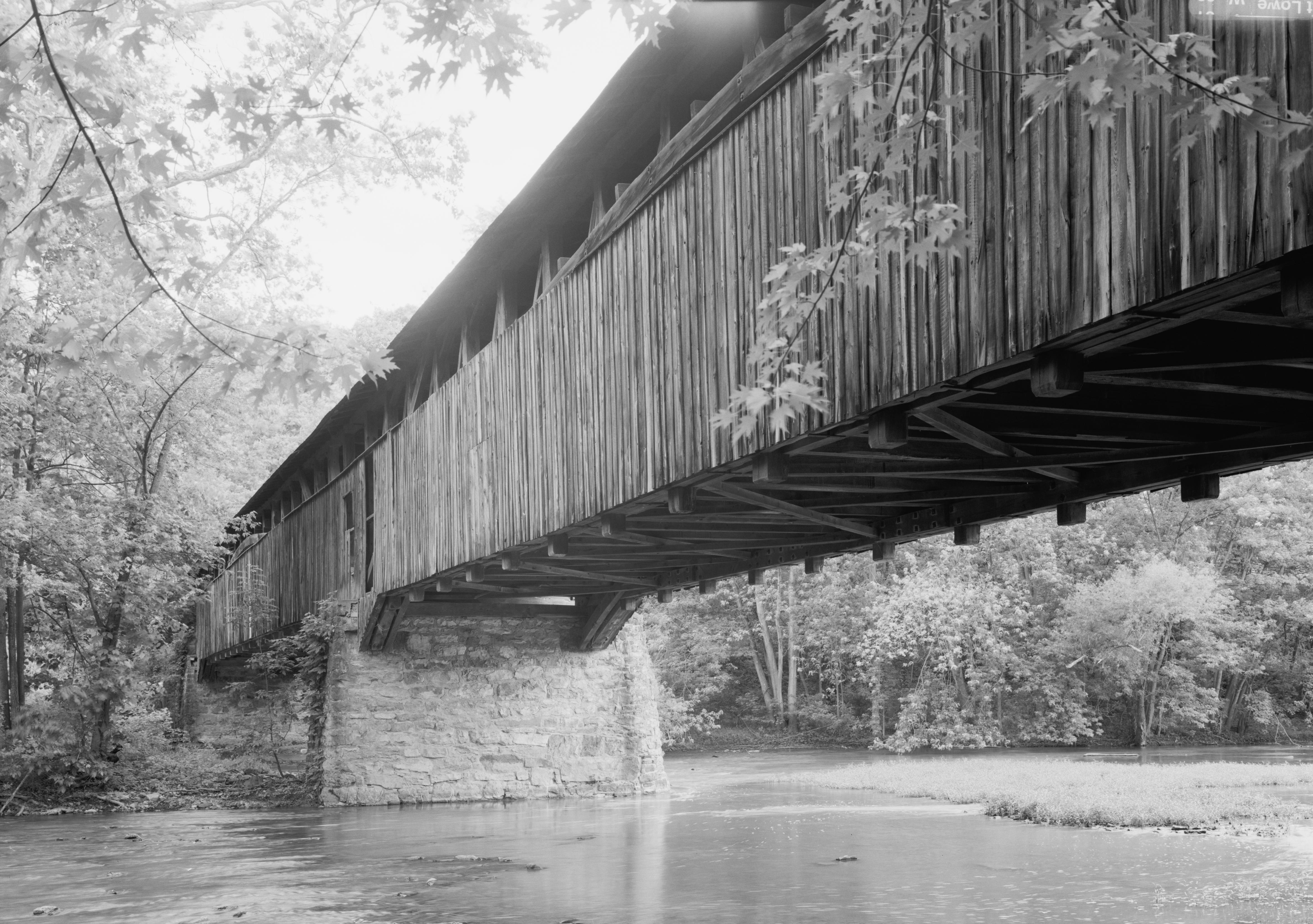
The Academia Pomeroy Covered Bridge

Eight locations in Juniata County are listed on the National Register of Historic Places. They were listed between 1972 and 1986. They include the Academia Pomeroy Covered Bridge, the Tuscarora Academy, and the Book site in Beale Township; the Lehmans-Port Royal Bridge in Milford Township; and the East Oriental and North Oriental covered bridges. The Dimmsville Covered Bridge in Greenwood Township had been designated as a historic place, but fell into disrepair and collapsed in April 2017. Eight additional places are eligible for a listing on the National Register of Historic Places. There are five Pennsylvania Historical and Museum Commission historical markers in Juniata County. They commemorate the Tuscarora Path, the Tuscarora Academy, Patterson's Fort, Fort Bingham, and Juniata County itself.

The Academia Pomeroy Covered Bridge (also known as the Pomeroy Academia Covered Bridge) was built in 1901. It is 18 feet (5.5 m) wide and 278 feet (85 m) long, making it one of the longest remaining covered bridges in Pennsylvania.

== Geography ==
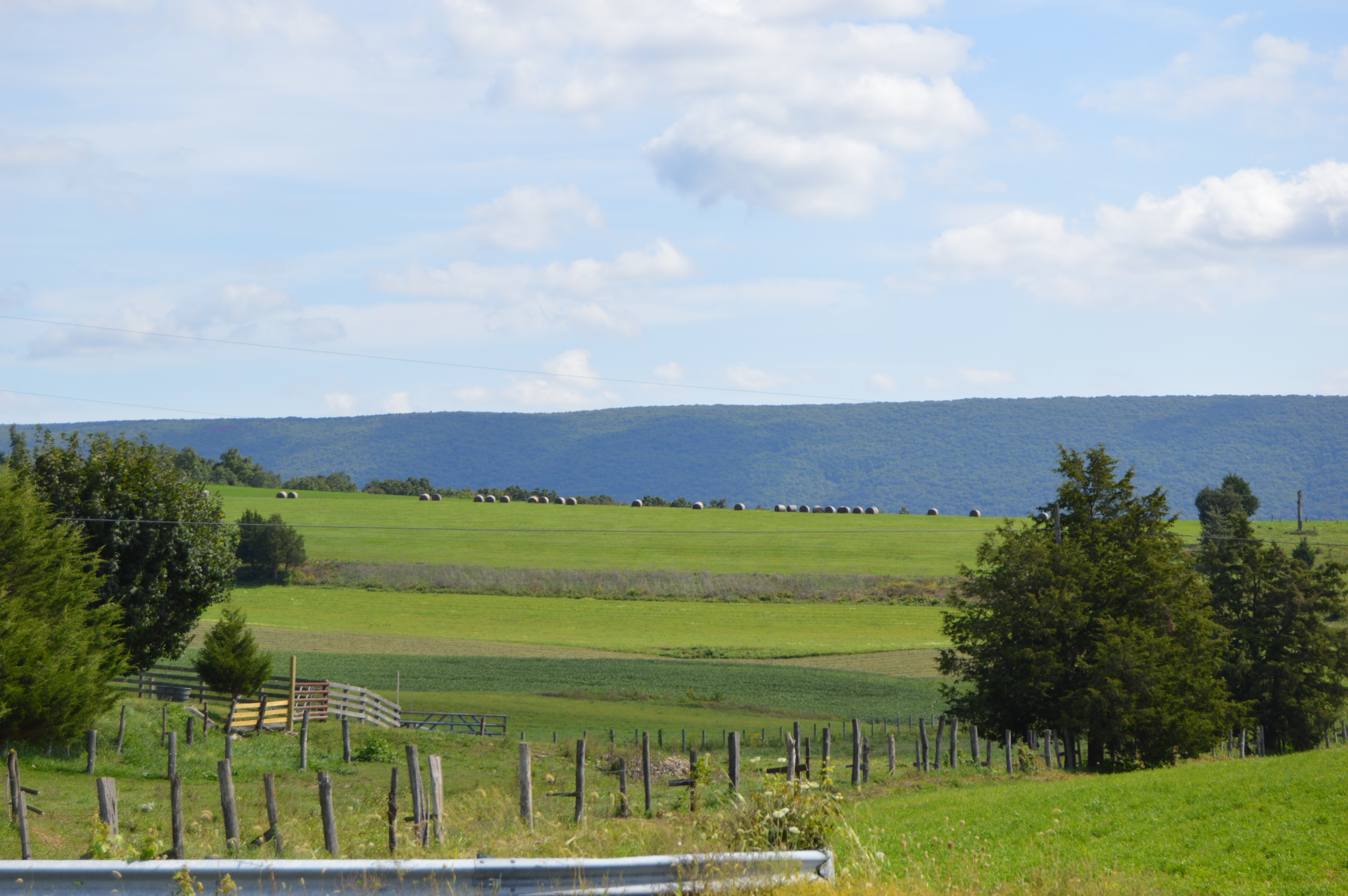
Fields near Tuscarora Creek in Beale Township, with Limestone Ridge in the background

According to the U.S. Census Bureau, the county has a total area of 394 square miles (1,020 km^{2}), of which 391 square miles (1,010 km^{2}) is land and 2.2 square miles (5.7 km^{2}) (0.6%) is water.

Juniata County is located between two major metropolitan areas. One is State College, which is northwest of the county. The other is Harrisburg, which is to the southeast of the county. U.S. Route 22/U.S. Route 322, which is a four-lane highway, leads from the county to these metropolitan areas.

Parts of Juniata County are fairly flat, but there are areas in the county with slopes of 25% or greater. However, most development in the county is confined to areas with slopes of 15% or less. Many of the county's steepest slopes, with grades of 25% of more, are located on the edges of the county. These slopes are generally found on mountainous ridges. However, there are some similarly steep slopes in the middle of the county. All four boroughs in the county have slopes with a grade of 25% or more near them. Slopes of 15% to 25% can be found throughout the county.

Much of Juniata County is hilly. Mountains occupy many of the county's borders. Tuscarora Mountain forms the county's border with Perry County. Shade Mountain runs from Snyder County through Juniata County and into Huntingdon County. Juniata County is one of the 423 counties served by the Appalachian Regional Commission, and it is identified as part of the "Midlands" by Colin Woodard in his book American Nations: A History of the Eleven Rival Regional Cultures of North America.

There are two locations in Juniata County that the Juniata County Comprehensive Plan describes as "outstanding and unique scenic features". These are Hawstone Overlook and the Concord Narrows. Hawstone Overlook is an overlook in Milford Township on Pennsylvania Route 333, from which the Juniata River between Shade Mountain and Blue Mountain can be seen, as well as the Lewistown Narrows. The Concord Narrows are a narrow water gap where the Juniata River flows past Tuscarora Mountain. Quartizite from the Silurian Period can be found in this water gap.

=== Rivers and watersheds ===
There are several major streams and rivers in Juniata County. These include the Susquehanna River, the Juniata River, Tuscarora Creek, Cocolamus Creek, West Branch Mahantango Creek, Licking Creek, and Lost Creek.

112,000 acres, or 45% of Juniata County's area is in the Tuscarora Creek watershed, including the borough of Port Royal. 59,000 acres (24% of the county's area) is in the Juniata River watershed. This area includes parts of all four of the boroughs in the county. 26,000 acres of Juniata County are in the Cocolamus Creek watershed and a similar amount of the county is in the watershed of Lost Creek. 20,000 acres (8% of the counties area) are in the West Branch Mahantango Creek watershed.

=== Land use ===
Oakland Mills Evangelical Methodist Church, a congregation of the Evangelical Methodist Church Conference (EMCC), located in Oakland Mills, Pennsylvania

Residential land makes up more than 50,000 acres, or one fifth, of Juniata County's area. The bulk of residential land is single-family dwellings, but seasonal homes and mobile homes also make up significant portions of it. The county's residential land is concentrated along in its boroughs, but occurs along roads and in villages throughout the county. Multi-family residential land is comparatively rare. Less than 1% of the county's land (430 acres) is used for manufacturing purposes. Only approximately 370 acres are used for transportation and utilities. Roughly 300 acres are used for transportation and communication and 70 acres are used for other utilities. Businesses make up 0.21% of the county's land, or 525 acres. 490 acres are devoted to retail businesses, while 35 acres are devoted to wholesale businesses. Services occupy 0.67% of the county's area.

Land devoted to recreation in Juniata County makes up 0.5%, or 1000 acres, of its area. Agricultural land comprises 41% (101,000 acres) of the county. A total of 167,500 acres, or approximately two thirds of the county's area, is forested land. Large portions of the southwestern part of the county are forested. 34% of the county's land is undeveloped, most of which (60,000 acres) is unused land.

The vast majority of Juniata County is rural land. However, there are a few rural hamlets and villages (which have one to four housing units per acre) scattered throughout the county. There is also an area termed a "high growth area" by the Juniata County Comprehensive Plan near the boroughs of Mifflin and Mifflintown. It has between 8 and 17 housing units per acre. The Juniata County Comprehensive Plan also designates areas near Thompsontown and Port Royal as "rural growth area[s]". These areas have three to six housing units per acre.

=== Climate ===
Juniata has a humid continental climate, which is hot-summer (Dfa), except in higher areas where it is warm-summer (Dfb). Average temperatures in the Mifflin-Mifflintown vicinity range from 28.1 °F in January to 73.2 °F in July.

=== Adjacent counties ===
- Mifflin County (northwest)
- Snyder County (north)
- Northumberland County (northeast)
- Dauphin County (southeast)
- Perry County (south)
- Franklin County (south)
- Huntingdon County (southwest)

== Geology ==
Juniata County lies over 16 different rock formations, some of which contain limestone. These rock formations come from the Ordovician Period, the Silurian Period, and the Devonian Period. The northernmost part of the county contains rocks of the Juniata Formation, the Bald Eagle Formation, and undivided Juniata and Bald Eagle formations. All of these formations primarily consist of sandstone. South of these formations lie the Bloomsburg and Mifflintown Formation undivided, the Clinton Group, and the Tuscarora Formation. The first two of these consist mainly of shale, while the third is composed of quartzite. The rock formations in the southwestern part of the county include the Brallier and Harrell Formations undivided, the Hamilton Group, the Irish Valley member of the Catskill Formation, and others. The eastern part of the county lies almost entirely over the Hamilton Group, the Tuscarora Formation, and the Irish Valley member of the Cataskill Formation.

Other rock formations found in Juniata County include the Keyser through Mifflintown Formation undivided, the Keyser and Tonoloway Formation undivided, the Onondaga and Old Port Formations undivided, the Reedsville Formation, the Trimmers Rock Formation, the Wills Creek Formation, and the Wills Creek Formation through Mifflintown Formation undivided.

Four of the rock formations found in Juniata County come from the Ordovician Period, seven come from the Silurian Period, and seven come from the Devonian Period.

There are seven soil associations in Juniata County. One of these is the Hazelton-Laidig-Buchanan Association. It is a deep and fairly well-drained soil that is found in 24% of the county. It is mostly found in the county's forested areas. The Berks-Weikert-Bedington Association is also found in the county. It is found in 33% of the county's area and is not as deep as the Hazelton-Laidig-Buchanan Association, but is well-drained. The soil is mostly found in agricultural lands and some forested areas. Another soil association in the county is the Edon-Opequon-Weikert Association, which is a well-drained soil that occupies 17% of the county. The Elliber-Kreamer-Mertz Association is a deep and well-drained soil that makes up 12% of the county. The Chenango-Pope-Holly Association and the Morrison-Hazelton-Clymer Association make up 7% and 6% of the county, respectively. They are both deep and occur on gentle slopes. However, the former is poorly drained, while the latter is well-drained. The Hazelton-Laidig-Buchanan Association is well-drained and makes up 1% of the county's area.

There are 51 different soil types in Juniata County, of which 18 are considered prime farmland. There are few agricultural soils on the northern and southern edges of the county.

The main rock formations in the boroughs of Mifflin and Mifflintown are the undivided Keyser and Tonoloway Formations and the Irish Valley Member of the Catskill Formation. The same rock formations are found in the borough of Port Royal, along with the Clinton Group and the Hamilton Group to the northwest and southeast of the borough, respectively. The Hamilton Group, the Keyser and Tonoloway Formations, and the Irish Valley Member of the Catskill Formation are found in or near the borough of Thompsontown.

== Climate ==
Juniata County is in the Humid Continental climatic region. In the summer, highs are generally in between 80 and 90 °F (27 and 32 °C), but on occasion exceed 90 °F (32 °C). The lows in the summer are typically slightly below 60 °F (16 °C). High temperatures in the winter are usually between 30 and 40 °F (−1 and 4 °C).

On average, Juniata County receives 38 inches (97 cm) of precipitation per year. An average of 28 inches (71 cm) of snow fall on the county each winter. The county rarely experiences long-term droughts, but does experience short-term droughts often.

== Demographics ==
Historical population
Census	Pop.	Note	%±
1840	11,080		—
1850	13,029		17.6%
1860	16,986		30.4%
1870	17,390		2.4%
1880	18,227		4.8%
1890	16,655		−8.6%
1900	16,054		−3.6%
1910	15,013		−6.5%
1920	14,464		−3.7%
1930	14,325		−1.0%
1940	15,373		7.3%
1950	15,243		−0.8%
1960	15,874		4.1%
1970	16,712		5.3%
1980	19,188		14.8%
1990	20,625		7.5%
2000	22,821		10.6%
2010	24,636		8.0%
2020	23,509		−4.6%
2025 (est.)	23,403	▼	−0.5%

=== Racial and ethnic composition ===
Juniata County, Pennsylvania – Racial and ethnic composition Note: the US Census treats Hispanic/Latino as an ethnic category. This table excludes Latinos from the racial categories and assigns them to a separate category. Hispanics/Latinos may be of any race.
Race / Ethnicity (NH = Non-Hispanic)	Pop 1980	Pop 1990	Pop 2000	Pop 2010	Pop 2020	% 1980	% 1990	% 2000	% 2010	% 2020
White alone (NH)	19,056	20,487	22,205	23,584	21,830	99.31%	99.33%	97.30%	95.73%	92.86%
Black or African American alone (NH)	17	26	68	134	115	0.09%	0.13%	0.30%	0.54%	0.49%
Native American or Alaska Native alone (NH)	8	17	32	24	19	0.04%	0.08%	0.14%	0.10%	0.08%
Asian alone (NH)	10	41	57	85	69	0.05%	0.20%	0.25%	0.35%	0.29%
Native Hawaiian or Pacific Islander alone (NH)	x	x	1	1	4	x	x	0.00%	0.00%	0.02%
Other race alone (NH)	20	5	2	6	48	0.10%	0.02%	0.01%	0.02%	0.20%
Mixed race or Multiracial (NH)	x	x	87	179	516	x	x	0.38%	0.73%	2.19%
Hispanic or Latino (any race)	77	49	369	623	908	0.40%	0.24%	1.62%	2.53%	3.86%
Total	19,188	20,625	22,821	24,636	23,509	100.00%	100.00%	100.00%	100.00%	100.00%

=== 2020 census ===
As of the 2020 census, the county had a population of 23,509. The median age was 43.2 years. 22.0% of residents were under the age of 18 and 20.9% of residents were 65 years of age or older. For every 100 females there were 100.1 males, and for every 100 females age 18 and over there were 99.3 males age 18 and over.

There were 9,249 households in the county, of which 28.0% had children under the age of 18 living in them. Of all households, 56.5% were married-couple households, 17.1% were households with a male householder and no spouse or partner present, and 19.9% were households with a female householder and no spouse or partner present. About 25.0% of all households were made up of individuals and 12.5% had someone living alone who was 65 years of age or older.

There were 10,431 housing units, of which 11.3% were vacant. Among occupied housing units, 75.3% were owner-occupied and 24.7% were renter-occupied. The homeowner vacancy rate was 1.0% and the rental vacancy rate was 6.1%.

<0.1% of residents lived in urban areas, while 100.0% lived in rural areas.

=== 2010 census ===
At the 2010 census, there were 24,636 people, 9,476 households, and 6,839 families residing in Juniata County. The population density was 63 people per square mile (24 people/km^{2}). There were 10,978 housing units at an average density of 28 units per square mile (11/km^{2}). The racial makeup of the county was 96.8% White, 0.6% Black or African American, 0.1% Native American, 0.3% Asian (0.1% Indian, 0.1% Chinese, and 0.1% Korean), 1.1% from other races, and 1% from two or more races.

There are eight Filipino people, five Vietnamese people, and two Samoans in Juniata County.

2.5% of the population were Hispanic or Latino of any race. These include 195 Puerto Ricans, 77 Mexicans, and 2 Cubans. The highest percentage of Hispanic people in any township or borough in the county is 8.71%, in Mifflintown. Between 1990 and 2000, the Hispanic population in the county increased by 653%.

At the 2010 census, the average household size in Juniata County was 2.57 and the average family size was 3.01. 23.0% of the county's households were inhabited by a single individual.

At the 2010 census, the population in Juniata County was spread out, with 6.3% under 5 years of age, 6.8% from 5 to 9 years of age, and the same percentage from 10 to 14 years of age. 6.5% of the county's inhabitants were 15 to 19 years of age, 5.4% were 20 to 24 years old, 5.3% were 25 to 29 years old, and 5.5% were 30 to 34 years old. People of 35 to 39 years of age comprised 6.1% of the population, 40- to 44-year-olds comprised 6.6% of the population, and 7.6% of the population consisted of 50- to 54-year-olds. People of 55 to 59 years of age made up 7.6% of the population, people of 60 to 54 years of age comprised 6.0% of it, and 65- to 69-year-olds made up 4.9% of the population. People of 70 to 74 years of age make up 3.9% of the county's population, people of 75 to 79 years of age make up 3.2% of the population, people of 80 to 84 years old make up 2.5% of the population, and people older than 85 years make up 2.3% of the population.

=== 2000 census ===
In 2000, 45.4% of the population of Juniata County were of German, 20.2% American, 5.7% Irish and 5.0% English ancestry according to Census 2000. 3.95% reported speaking Pennsylvania Dutch, German, or Dutch at home; 1.63% speak Spanish.

In 2000, there were 11,353 males and 11,468 females in Juniata County, or 98.99 males per 100 females. The highest percentage of males in any administrative division in the county was 52.07%, in Beale Township. The highest percentage of females in any township or borough in the county was 52.95%, in Fermanagh Township.

The housing density and population density of Juniata County is considerably below average for a Pennsylvania county.

The administrative subdivisions of Juniata County with the highest population density are Mifflintown (with a density of 6,184.9 people per square mile), Mifflin (with a density of 3506.9 people per square mile), and Thompsontown (with a density of 2193.1 people per square mile). The township with the highest population density in the county is Monroe Township, with 104.0 people per square mile. The highest density of housing units in the county is in Mifflintown (2,837.4 per square mile), followed by Mifflin (1,454.2 per square mile) and Thompsontown (1,144.4 per square mile). Greenwood Township has the third lowest population density of any administrative division in Juniata County: 27.9 people per square mile. The second lowest density is in Tuscarora Township (24.5 people per square mile) and the lowest density is in Lack Township (13.2 people per square mile). The lowest density of housing units in the county is in Lack Township (10.0 per square mile), the second-lowest density is in Greenwood Township (11.3 per square mile), and the third-lowest density is in Tuscarora Township (13.7 per square mile).

Between 1940 and 2005, the population of Juniata County was proportionally the third fastest-growing population of any county in Pennsylvania, with only Snyder County's and Perry County's populations growing faster. In this time period, the county's population has increased by 50.69%, or 7,792 people. In the 1980s, the county's rate of population growth was more than 50 times higher than the rate of population growth in Pennsylvania. The county's rate of population growth in the 1970s was even higher.

Susquehanna Township's population was the fastest-growing population of any administrative division in Juniata County between 1990 and 2005, with an increase of 35.42%. Other fast-growing populations in the county include those of Milford Township (22.53%) and Thompsontown (20.1%). The populations of Mifflin and Mifflintown are the only administrative divisions in the county whose populations decreased in that time period (at a rate of -7.42% and -3.7%, respectively). However, between 2000 and 2005, eight administrative divisions experienced decreasing populations. Between 1990 and 2000, every borough and township in the county experienced an increase in population.

== Law and government ==
United States presidential election results for Juniata County, Pennsylvania
Year	Republican		Democratic		Third party(ies)	
Year	No.	%	No.	%	No.	%
1888	1,760	47.58%	1,842	49.80%	97	2.62%
1892	1,621	47.58%	1,695	49.75%	91	2.67%
1896	2,059	52.03%	1,819	45.97%	79	2.00%
1900	1,805	51.50%	1,621	46.25%	79	2.25%
1904	1,985	60.28%	1,202	36.50%	106	3.22%
1908	1,765	54.09%	1,414	43.33%	84	2.57%
1912	374	13.33%	1,148	40.91%	1,284	45.76%
1916	1,254	44.66%	1,497	53.31%	57	2.03%
1920	2,112	58.21%	1,443	39.77%	73	2.01%
1924	2,177	57.41%	1,420	37.45%	195	5.14%
1928	4,396	82.00%	919	17.14%	46	0.86%
1932	2,752	48.44%	2,805	49.38%	124	2.18%
1936	3,576	48.28%	3,782	51.06%	49	0.66%
1940	3,507	49.41%	3,579	50.42%	12	0.17%
1944	3,512	56.71%	2,666	43.05%	15	0.24%
1948	3,121	57.17%	2,299	42.11%	39	0.71%
1952	3,863	58.63%	2,705	41.05%	21	0.32%
1956	4,258	60.45%	2,779	39.45%	7	0.10%
1960	4,805	64.66%	2,615	35.19%	11	0.15%
1964	3,087	42.67%	4,138	57.19%	10	0.14%
1968	4,039	58.76%	2,321	33.76%	514	7.48%
1972	4,412	66.32%	2,156	32.41%	85	1.28%
1976	3,991	55.38%	3,105	43.09%	110	1.53%
1980	4,139	57.80%	2,696	37.65%	326	4.55%
1984	5,059	65.66%	2,624	34.06%	22	0.29%
1988	4,881	62.87%	2,834	36.50%	49	0.63%
1992	3,980	47.27%	2,601	30.89%	1,839	21.84%
1996	4,128	51.70%	2,896	36.27%	960	12.02%
2000	5,795	66.86%	2,656	30.64%	216	2.49%
2004	7,144	71.40%	2,797	27.95%	65	0.65%
2008	6,484	66.04%	3,068	31.25%	267	2.72%
2012	6,862	71.52%	2,547	26.55%	186	1.94%
2016	8,273	78.45%	1,821	17.27%	451	4.28%
2020	9,649	79.93%	2,253	18.66%	170	1.41%
2024	9,721	80.08%	2,290	18.86%	128	1.05%

United States Senate election results for Juniata County, Pennsylvania1
Year	Republican		Democratic		Third party(ies)	
Year	No.	%	No.	%	No.	%
1994	3,896	57.79%	2,430	36.04%	416	6.17%
2000	5,912	69.29%	2,407	28.21%	213	2.50%
2006	4,557	58.48%	3,236	41.52%	0	0.00%
2012	6,337	66.35%	3,010	31.52%	204	2.14%
2018	5,853	69.12%	2,412	28.48%	203	2.40%
2024	9,252	76.82%	2,478	20.58%	313	2.60%

United States Senate election results for Juniata County, Pennsylvania3
Year	Republican		Democratic		Third party(ies)	
Year	No.	%	No.	%	No.	%
1992	4,663	56.07%	3,120	37.52%	533	6.41%
1998	4,034	68.29%	1,720	29.12%	153	2.59%
2004	6,840	69.66%	2,235	22.76%	744	7.58%
2010	5,504	75.06%	1,829	24.94%	0	0.00%
2016	7,657	73.47%	2,153	20.66%	612	5.87%
2022	7,265	74.68%	2,111	21.70%	352	3.62%

Pennsylvania Gubernatorial election results for Juniata County
Year	Republican		Democratic		Third party(ies)	
Year	No.	%	No.	%	No.	%
1970	3,256	52.02%	2,861	45.71%	142	2.27%
1974	2,978	48.62%	3,112	50.81%	35	0.57%
1978	3,814	61.25%	2,389	38.37%	24	0.39%
1982	3,221	50.23%	3,172	49.46%	20	0.31%
1986	3,683	55.18%	2,952	44.22%	40	0.60%
1990	1,637	26.18%	4,617	73.82%	0	0.00%
1994	3,548	51.90%	2,133	31.20%	1,155	16.90%
1998	3,947	65.98%	1,266	21.16%	769	12.86%
2002	5,027	68.40%	2,187	29.76%	135	1.84%
2006	4,995	64.51%	2,748	35.49%	0	0.00%
2010	5,834	79.18%	1,534	20.82%	0	0.00%
2014	4,431	67.11%	2,172	32.89%	0	0.00%
2018	5,780	68.06%	2,550	30.02%	163	1.92%
2022	6,851	70.14%	2,761	28.27%	156	1.60%

=== Law enforcement ===
As of 2016 all areas in the county use the Pennsylvania State Police (PSP) in a law enforcement capacity, either with part-time police departments or with no other police departments.

=== Voter registration ===
As of August 27, 2025, there are 14,069 registered voters in the county. There are 10,030 registered Republicans, 2,596 registered Democrats, 1,107 voters registered non-affiliated voters, and 336 voters registered to other parties.

Chart of Voter Registration
1. Republican (71.3%)
2. Democratic (18.4%)
3. Independent (7.90%)
4. Other Parties (2.40%)

=== State Senate ===
- Judy Ward, Republican, Pennsylvania's 30th Senatorial District

=== State House of Representatives ===
- David H. Rowe, Republican, Pennsylvania's 85th Representative District
- Perry A. Stambaugh, Republican, Pennsylvania's 86th Representative District

=== United States House of Representatives ===
- John Joyce, Republican, Pennsylvania's 13th congressional district

=== United States Senate ===
- Dave McCormick, Republican
- John Fetterman, Democrat

== Infrastructure, industry, and economy ==
In 2000, the agricultural, hunting/fishing, forestry, and mining industries made up 5.46% of the industry in Juniata County. Livestock farming was more popular in the county than crop cultivation. In 2002, the egg and poultry industry in the county generated $32 million in sales (the 7th highest of the Pennsylvania counties) and the dairy industry generated $17 million in sales (the 23rd highest of the Pennsylvania counties). The hog and pig industry generated $7 million and the cattle industry generated $4 million in sales (the 10th and 27th highest of Pennsylvania counties, respectively). The county's grain industry generated $1 million (the 35th highest of Pennsylvania counties). The county is the fourth most prolific poultry-producing county in Pennsylvania. In addition to the aforementioned industries, there are also small-scale clothing manufacturing businesses in the county.

There were 801 farms in Juniata County in 1997, occupying a total of 96,312 acres of farmland. By 2002, there were only 644 farms and 86,203 acres of farmland.

There is one public library in Juniata County: the Juniata County Library in Mifflintown. It has approximately 64,000 materials and an annual circulation of 131,940 materials. It celebrated its 50th anniversary in 2016.

There are no hospitals in Juniata County. The county is served by a hospital in Lewistown, which was established in 1905. The county has six emergency medical services units and eight fire companies, all of which are volunteer fire departments. As the county does not have its own police force, it is served by the Pennsylvania State Police.

There are more than 100 cemeteries in Juniata County.

=== Economic and employment statistics ===
In 2000, the most common occupation in Juniata County was manufacturing. 23.6% of employed people over 16 years old in the county performed manufacturing jobs. 10.5% of employed people older than 16 worked in health services, 9.5% worked in other services, 9.3% each work in construction and retail, 6.2% worked in public administration, and 6.1% worked in transportation. 5.6% had an occupation in the field of education, and a similar number worked in finance, insurance, and real estate. 5.5% worked in agriculture, fishing, forestry, or mining, 3.5% worked in wholesale trade, 1.7% worked in communications, utilities, and related fields.

In 2000, a total of 1,955 households in Juniata County made less than $20,000 per year and 3036 households made $20,000 to $39,999 per year. 1,940 households made $40,000 to $59,999 per year, 1,308 households made $60,000 to $99,999 per year, and 216 households made $100,000 to $149,999 per year. 125 households made more than $150,000 per year. In 1999, the median household income for the county was $34,698 per year and the median family income was $39,757 per year. Both of these figures are lower than the average for Pennsylvania. The per capita income in the county was $16,142 per year in 1999 and $14,539 in 1989. The county's poverty rate, 9.5%, is below the average poverty rate for Pennsylvania, which is 11%. In 1999, Mifflin had the highest poverty rate of any township or borough in the county, 17.54%. Greenwood Township had the lowest poverty rate, 6.99%. The county's unemployment rate was 5.3% in 1999 and 5.4% in 2008. According to the Juniata County Comprehensive Plan, the economic situation in the county "suggests a fairly healthy county economy".

Of the boroughs and townships in Juniata County, Beale Township had the highest household and family income in 1999: $41,458 and $43,625, respectively. The borough of Mifflin had the lowest household and family income in 1999: $26,438 and $28,750, respectively.

94.32% of the houses in Juniata County have full plumbing facilities. This is below Pennsylvania's average (98.51%), which may be due to the presence of cabins and other houses that are not permanently inhabited. Mifflin has the highest percentage of houses with full plumbing facilities of any township or borough in the county (100%). Lack Township has the lowest percentage of houses with full plumbing facilities (72.31%). There are six public sewer companies in the county, the largest of which, the Twin Boroughs Sanitary Authority, is used at a rate of 450,000 gallons per day. The county also has five public water companies, including the Port Royal Municipal Authority and the Mifflintown Municipal Authority. The Mifflintown Municipal Authority is the most-used water company in the county, serving 465,000 gallons of water per day.

On average, Juniata County generates 32 tons of solid waste per day.

Nine townships and all four boroughs in Juniata County receive electricity from PPL Corporation. The remaining townships are given electricity by First Energy and Valley Rural Electric Cooperative, Inc. Nittany Media Inc. and Dish and Direct TV provide cable services to the county.

=== Housing ===
In 2000, 28.70% of the houses in Juniata County were built before 1939, 6.51% were built in the 1940s, and 8.26% were built in the 1950s. 8.53% of the county's houses were built in the 1960s, 17.99% were built in the 1970s, and 14.18% were built in the 1980s. 15.82% of the houses were built in the 1990s or in 2000. The majority of the houses in Mifflin and Mifflintown were built before 1939.

In 2000, 14.43% of the houses in Juniata County were vacant. 9.42% of the county's houses were vacant for seasonal or recreational reasons. The county's vacancy rate is higher than average for Pennsylvania. Mifflintown had the lowest vacancy rate of any township or borough in the county (5.18%). Lack Township had the highest vacancy rate (48.77%). 66.49% of the county's houses are occupied by their owner and 19.08% are occupied by a renter. Many of the houses in the southwestern part of the county are seasonally occupied.

13.11% of the houses in Juniata County cost less than $50,000 and 51.07% cost $50,000 to $99,999. 17.51% of the county's houses cost $100,000 to $124,999 and 9.74% cost from $125,000 to $149,999. 4.62% of the houses cost between $150,000 and $174,999 and 1.21% cost between $175,000 and $199,999. 1.92% of the houses in the county cost between $200,000 and $249,999, 0.39% cost between $250,000 and $299,999, and 0.43% cost more than $300,000. Of the administrative divisions in the county, Fermanagh Township has the highest percentage of houses costing over $300,000 (1.34%) and numerous townships and boroughs in the county do not have any houses costing over $300,000. Mifflin has the highest percentage of houses costing less than $50,000 (56.48%) and Delaware Township has the lowest percentage of such houses (4.73%).

In 1990, the median house value in Juniata County was $51,500. This rose to $87,000 by 2000.

=== Crime ===
The most common crimes committed in Juniata County between 2005 and November 2007 were property crimes, with 996 recorded offenses. Other common crimes in the county are assaults, with 383 offenses between 2005 and 2007 and alcohol-related crimes, with 306 offenses between 2005 and 2007. Rarer crimes in the county include drug violations (71 offenses between 2005 and 2007), sex offenses (64 offenses between 2005 and 2007) and arson, with only 12 offenses between 2005 and 2007. There were no homicides in the county in these years.

=== Recreation ===
There are municipal parks in all four boroughs of Juniata County. There are also five boat launches in the county, all of which are on or near the Juniata River. There are two golf courses in the central part of the county and one campground in the southern part of the county.

== Transportation ==
=== Roads ===
The main roads in the eastern part of Juniata County are Pennsylvania Route 235, Pennsylvania Route 35, Pennsylvania Route 104, and U.S. Route 11/U.S. Route 15. The main roads in western Juniata County are U.S. Route 22/U.S. Route 322, Pennsylvania Route 74, Pennsylvania Route 850, and Pennsylvania Route 333. U.S. Route 22/U.S. Route 322 experiences the most traffic. It and U.S. Route 11/U.S. Route 15 are considered major arterial roads. Pennsylvania Route 75 and Pennsylvania Route 35 northeast of U.S. Route 22/U.S. Route 322 are minor arterial roads. Major rural collector roads in the county include Pennsylvania Route 850 Pennsylvania Route 74, Pennsylvania Route 235, and Pennsylvania Route 35 southwest of U.S. Route 22/U.S. Route 322. Minor rural collector roads include Pennsylvania Route 333 and numerous less prominent roads. There are also many local roads throughout the county, most of which are in its northeastern and central parts.

There are approximately 735 miles (1,183 km) of roads in Juniata County's road system. 372.6 miles (599.6 km) of the roads are locally owned, 354.9 miles (571.2 km) are owned by the Pennsylvania Department of Transportation, and 8.0 miles (12.9 km) are owned by Pennsylvania or the United States. 508.3 miles (818.0 km) are local roads, 89.7 miles (144.4 km) are minor collector roads, 68.7 miles (110.6 km) are major collector roads, 46.8 miles (75.3 km) are minor arterial roads, and 21.4 miles (34.4 km) are major arterial roads.

The daily traffic of Juniata County's arterial roads ranges from several dozen to several thousand vehicles per day. Pennsylvania Route 75 carries 50 vehicles per day in the southwestern part of the county and 7,000 vehicles per day in the northeastern part of the county. Pennsylvania Route 104 carries 2,900 vehicles per day in the county. The most heavily traveled road there, however, is U.S. Route 22/U.S. Route 322, which carries 11,000 to 18,000 vehicles per day. The least-trafficked major rural connector road is State Route 2026, which is used by 350 vehicles per day and the most-trafficked major rural connector road is Pennsylvania Route 35, which gets up to 7100 vehicles per day. Traffic on minor rural collector roads ranges from 100 vehicles per day on Academia Road to over 1000 vehicles per day on several roads. The volume of vehicle traffic in the county has changed little since the late 1990s.

U.S. Route 11 and U.S. Route 15 allow Juniata County residents to access numerous locations in New York, Pennsylvania, and Maryland. It receives approximately 12,000 vehicles per day in the county. Pennsylvania Route 35 allows access to Mifflin and Mifflintown from other locations in the county. Pennsylvania Route 75 is used by trucks in the county to access the Pennsylvania Turnpike.

There are 21 road intersections in Juniata County that were the site of five or more crashes between January 1, 2002, and December 31, 2006.

=== Bridges ===
There are 254 state-owned bridges in Juniata County, of which 77 are considered structurally deficient by the Pennsylvania Department of Transportation.

The longest bridge in Juniata County is the First Street Bridge over the Juniata River in Port Royal. It is 1,087 feet (331 m) long and was built in 1937. The second-longest bridge in the county crosses the Juniata River at Thompsontown Station and is 808.1 feet (246.3 m) long. It was built in 1994. All other bridges in the county are less than 500 feet (150 m) long.

=== Other transportation ===
For air travel, Juniata County is served by the privately owned Mifflintown Airport and the Stottle Memorial Heliport in Tuscarora Township.

The BicyclePA Route J runs through Juniata County on U.S. Route 11 and U.S. Route 15.

== Education ==
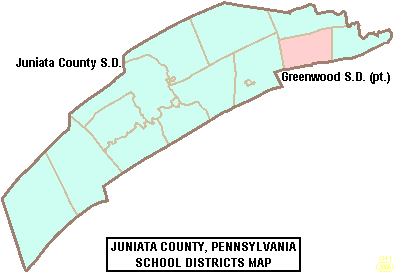
Map of Juniata County, Pennsylvania Public School Districts

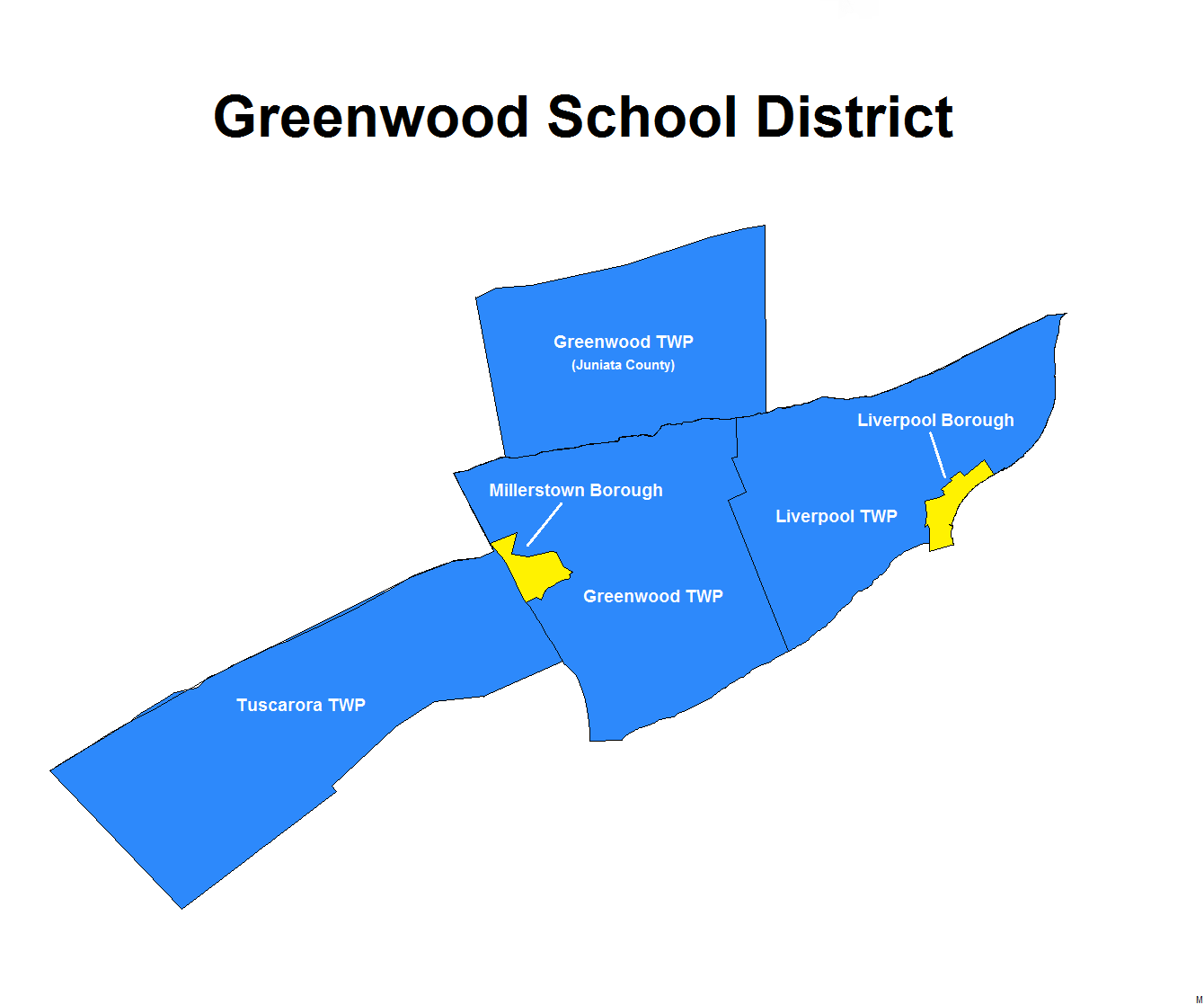
Map of Greenwood School District

=== Schools and school districts ===
There are two public school districts in Juniata County: the Juniata County School District and the Greenwood School District. Both of these are K-12 school districts. The Greenwood School District serves Greenwood Township and parts of Perry County and the Juniata County School District serves the rest of Juniata County.

The Juniata County School District previously consisted of nine elementary schools, one junior high school, and two high schools. In the 2006–2007 school year, there were 3,123 students in the school district. The largest high school in the district is the Juniata High School, with 637 students. The largest elementary school in the district is the Fermanagh-Mifflintown Elementary School, with 238 students and the smallest one is the Susquehanna Township Elementary School, with 63 students. In the 2018–2019 academic year, the Juniata County School District consolidated into two elementary additions, centered on the existing schools of Fermanagh-Mifflintown Elementary School and Monroe Township Elementary School. Respectively, these schools were renamed as Juniata Elementary and East Juniata Elementary Schools.

The Greenwood School District has an elementary school, a middle school, and a high school. They have 449, 137, and 278 students, respectively.

Additionally, there are 12 private schools in Juniata County, most of which are religious schools run by groups such as the Amish or other types of Mennonites. Nearly all are based in Mifflintown, McAlisterville, or Thompsontown, although one is based in Port Royal. In May 2014, the largest private school in the county was the Juniata Christian School, which had 220 students, and the smallest private school was the Breezy Hollow Amish School, which had 18 students.

There are no colleges in Juniata County, although there are twelve in the county's general vicinity.

=== Statistics ===
In 1990, 16.91% of Juniata County residents over 25 years of age had less than a ninth-grade education. 17.93% of residents over 25 years of age had a ninth-grade education to a twelfth-grade education and 46.35% had graduated from high school. 7.80% of the residents had attended college, but did not have a degree and 3.76% had an associate degree. 4.67% of Juniata County residents aged 25 years or more had a bachelor's degree and 2.59% had a graduate or professional degree.

By 2000, the percentage of people with less than a ninth-grade education had decreased to 5% and the percentage with a ninth-grade to twelfth-grade education had decreased to 13%. The percentage of people who graduated high school decreased to 38%, but the percentage of people who attended college but did not get a degree increased to 16%. The percentage of people with an associate degree increased to 6%, the percentage of people who had a bachelor's degree increased to 14%, and the percentage of people with a graduate or professional degree increased to 8%.

Of the townships and boroughs in Juniata County, Lack Township has the highest percentage of people without a high school diploma (42.43%). Spruce Hill Township has the lowest percentage of people without a high school diploma (18.00%). Mifflintown has the highest percentage of people with a higher education.

== Biology ==
There are five areas in Juniata County that are protected by the Central Pennsylvania Conservancy: the Baker Easement, the Brady Bryner Preserve, the Gregory Alan Grening Preserve, the Grening Preserve Addition, the McLaughlin Easement, and the Port Royal Wetlands. The combined area of these lands is 415 acres. There are State Game Lands in the northwestern part of the county and state forests in the county's northern and southern portions.

Four streams in Juniata County are considered high-quality coldwater fisheries. There are also some Class A Wild Trout Waters in the northern and western parts of the county.

The Juniata County Natural Heritage Inventory lists 59 natural heritage sites in Juniata County. 11 are considered "exceptional significance", 19 are considered "high significance", 12 are considered "notable significance", and 17 are considered "local significance". Sites on the inventory are found in every township in the county except for Greenwood Township.

The largest remaining intact wetland in Juniata County may be the Cedar Spring Run Wetland, which is in Walker Township. The Juniata County Natural Heritage Inventory considers it to be an "exceptional significance" site. Numerous wetland plants that are rare in the area inhabit this wetland, including Quercus shumardii. The wetland is a red maple-black ash palustrine forest community. Another wetland on the Natural Heritage Inventory's list of exceptional significance sites is the Locust Run Wetlands, which is in Walker Township and Delaware Township. These wetlands consist of two large groups of temporary pools and several permanent ones. The West Branch Mahantango Creek Vernal Pools are also in the county. This system consist of dozens of temporary pools that are inhabited by Leucothoe racemosa. The Slim Valley Wetlands are in Fayette Township and Fermanagh Township. They contain spotted pondweed and serve as a breeding ground for amphibians.

There are four sites on Tuscarora Creek and its tributaries on the "exceptional significance" list in the Juniata County Natural Heritage Inventory. The Doyle Run Floodplain is located on the creek in Beale Township. It contains a silver maple floodplain forest and is home to Ranunculus flabellaris and many species that are rare in Pennsylvania. Barton Hollow, a tributary of Tuscarora Creek in Lack Township, is home to plant species such as Carex careyana and Pinus echinata and animal species such as the Emperor Butterfly and a mussel species known as the Triangle Floater. Tuscarora Creek supports Carex shortiana downstream of Blair Hollow in Lack Township, as well as 350 plant species and 50 animal species. The creek's valley downstream of Pennybaker Island in Lack Township is home to Samolus parviflorus and Quercus shumardii.

A woodland known as the Kurtz Valley Woodland is located in Delaware Township, Juniata County. It is listed as an "exceptional significance" site on the Juniata County Natural Heritage Inventory and contains a red cedar–redbud shrubland community, which is rare in Pennsylvania. The McAlister Limestone Glade is another "exceptional significance" site in the county. It is located in Fayette Township and contains a side-oats grama calcareous grassland, which is described as a "very important" natural feature. The Westfall Prairie is also located in Fayette Township and is home to a number of rare species.

Allegheny Woodrats live on the slopes of the Lewistown Narrows in Milford Township, Juniata County and Northern Myotis bats feed there. The Lewistown Narrows are an "exceptional significance" site according to the Juniata County Natural Heritage Inventory.

== Communities ==
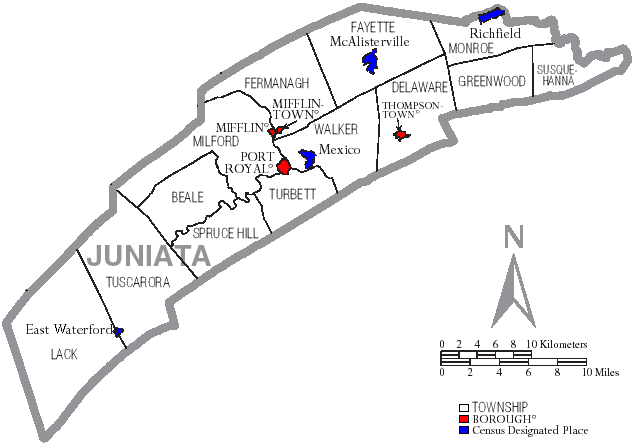
Map of Juniata County, Pennsylvania with Municipal Labels showing Boroughs (red), Townships (white), and Census-designated places (blue).

Under Pennsylvania law, there are four types of incorporated municipalities: cities, boroughs, townships, and, in at most two cases, towns.

=== Boroughs ===
Boroughs in Juniata County include:

- Mifflin
- Mifflintown (county seat)
- Port Royal
- Thompsontown

=== Townships ===
Townships in Juniata County include:

- Beale
- Delaware
- Fayette
- Fermanagh
- Greenwood
- Lack
- Milford
- Monroe
- Spruce Hill
- Susquehanna
- Turbett
- Tuscarora
- Walker

=== Unincorporated community ===
- Oakland Mills

=== Census-designated places ===
Census-designated places are geographical areas designated by the U.S. Census Bureau for the purposes of compiling demographic data. They are not actual jurisdictions under Pennsylvania. CDPs in Juniata County include:

- East Salem
- East Waterford
- McAlisterville
- Mexico
- Richfield

=== Population ranking ===
The population ranking of the following table is based on the 2010 census of Juniata County.

† county seat

Rank	City/town/etc.	Municipal type	Population (2010 census)
1	McAlisterville	CDP	971
2	† Mifflintown	Borough	936
3	Port Royal	Borough	925
4	Thompsontown	Borough	697
5	Mifflin	Borough	642
6	Richfield (partially in Snyder County)	CDP	549
7	Mexico	CDP	472
8	East Waterford	CDP	196
9	East Salem	CDP	196

== See also ==
- List of counties in Pennsylvania
- USS Juniata County (LST-850)
