= Delaware Township, Juniata County, Pennsylvania =

Township in Pennsylvania, US

Coordinates: 40°35′00″N 77°15′29″W

- Township
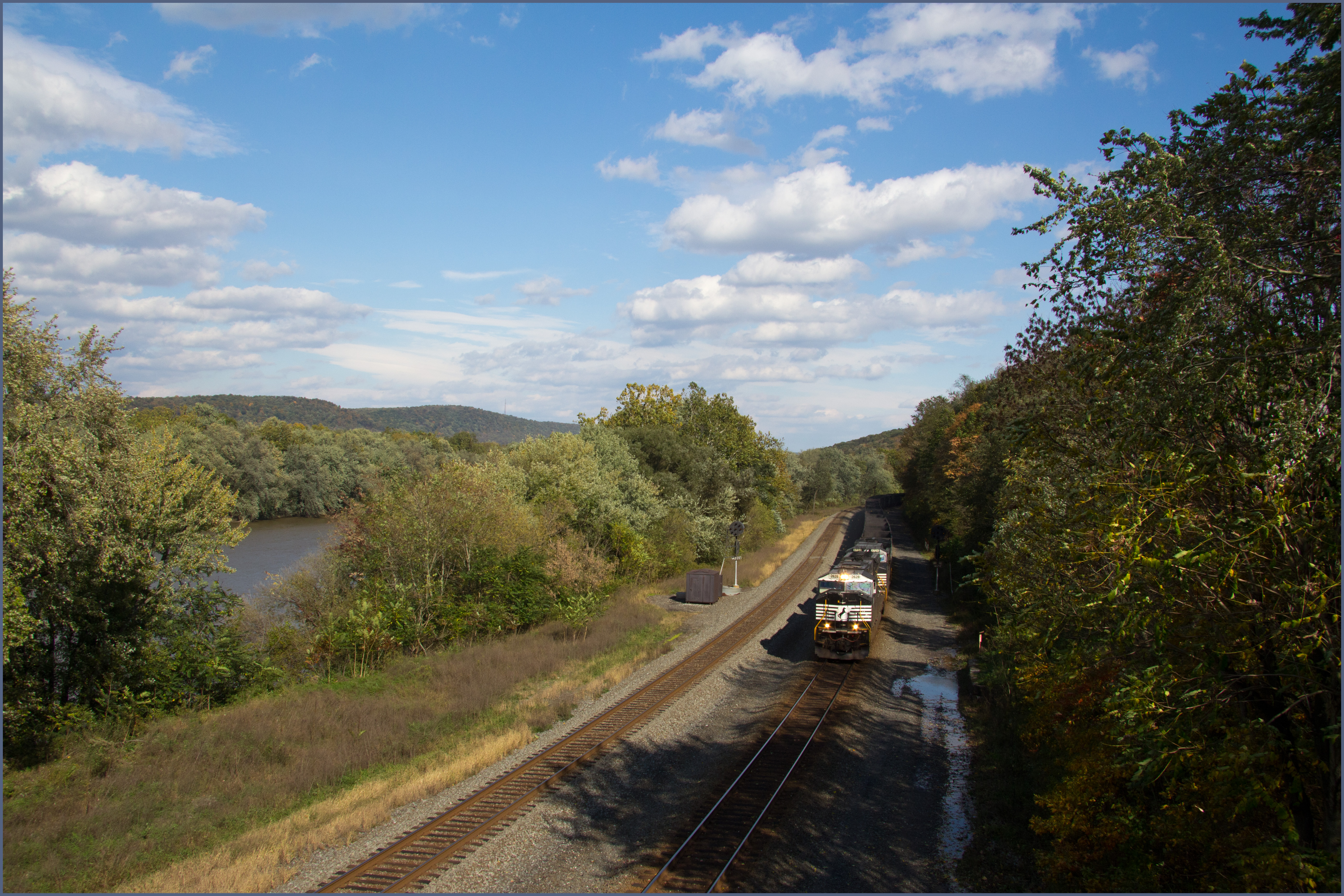
- Along the Juniata River across from Thompsontown

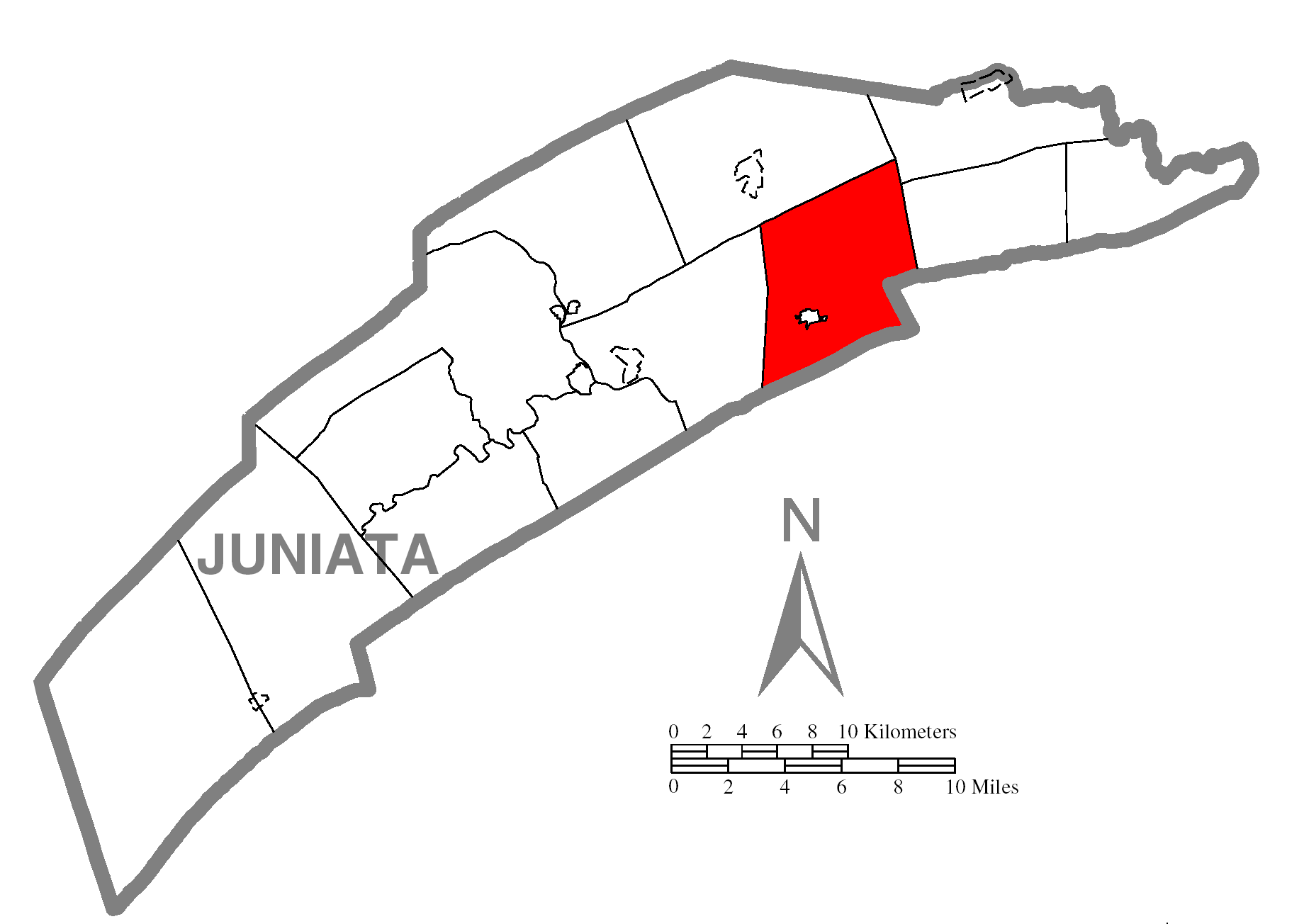
- Map of Juniata County, Pennsylvania highlighting Delaware Township

- Map of Juniata County, Pennsylvania
- Country: United States
- State: Pennsylvania
- County: Juniata
- Settled: 1763
- Incorporated: 1836

Area
  - Total: 29.61 sq mi (76.70 km^{2})
  - Land: 29.02 sq mi (75.17 km^{2})
  - Water: 0.59 sq mi (1.54 km^{2})

Population (2020)
  - Total: 1,610 ▲
  - Estimate (2022): 1,605
  - Density: 54.2/sq mi (20.94/km^{2})
- Time zone: UTC-5 (EST)
  - Summer (DST): UTC-4 (EDT)
- Area code: 717
- FIPS code: 42-067-18680
- Website: https://www.delawaretwp.com/

Delaware Township is a township in Juniata County, Pennsylvania, United States. The population was 1,610 at the 2020 census.

== Geography ==
The township is in eastern Juniata County and is bordered to the south by the crests of Tuscarora Mountain and Lock Ridge. The Juniata River flows through the southern part of the township. Delaware Creek flows through the township from north to south, entering the Juniata south of Thompsontown. Cocolamus Creek rises in the northeast corner of the township and joins the Juniata to the east in Greenwood Township. According to the United States Census Bureau, Delaware Township has a total area of 29.6 square miles (76.7 km^{2}), of which 29.0 square miles (75.2 km^{2}) are land and 0.58 square miles (1.5 km^{2}), or 2.00%, are water.

U.S. Routes 22 and 322 cross the township together as a four-lane expressway, leading west to Lewistown and southeast to Harrisburg.

Delaware Township is bordered by Fayette Township to the north, Monroe and Greenwood Townships to the east, Perry County to the east and south, and Walker Township to the west. The borough of Thompsontown is surrounded by Delaware Township. Unincorporated communities in the township include East Salem and Maze in the north, Goodville in the center, and Thompsontown station on the south side of the Juniata River.

== Demographics ==
Historical population
Census	Pop.	Note	%±
1850	890		—
1860	1,557		74.9%
1870	1,079		−30.7%
1880	1,171		8.5%
1890	1,144		−2.3%
1900	1,133		−1.0%
1910	1,009		−10.9%
1920	965		−4.4%
1930	1,050		8.8%
1940	956		−9.0%
1950	995		4.1%
1960	971		−2.4%
1970	1,082		11.4%
1980	1,408		30.1%
1990	1,440		2.3%
2000	1,464		1.7%
2010	1,547		5.7%
2020	1,610		4.1%
2022 (est.)	1,605		−0.3%
U.S. Decennial Census

As of the census of 2000, there were 1,464 people, 556 households, and 434 families residing in the township. The population density was 49.8 inhabitants per square mile (19.2/km^{2}). There were 642 housing units at an average density of 21.8/sq mi (8.4/km^{2}). The racial makeup of the township was 99.39% White, 0.14% Native American, 0.07% Asian, and 0.41% from two or more races. Hispanic or Latino of any race were 0.27% of the population.

There were 556 households, out of which 31.8% had children under the age of 18 living with them, 69.4% were married couples living together, 4.9% had a female householder with no husband present, and 21.9% were non-families. 18.7% of all households were made up of individuals, and 10.3% had someone living alone who was 65 years of age or older. The average household size was 2.59 and the average family size was 2.94.

In the township the population was spread out, with 23.3% under the age of 18, 8.3% from 18 to 24, 27.3% from 25 to 44, 25.8% from 45 to 64, and 15.4% who were 65 years of age or older. The median age was 39 years. For every 100 females there were 97.0 males. For every 100 females age 18 and over, there were 98.8 males.

The median income for a household in the township was $35,919, and the median income for a family was $38,920. Males had a median income of $29,605 versus $21,125 for females. The per capita income for the township was $16,840. About 4.1% of families and 7.4% of the population were below the poverty line, including 12.1% of those under age 18 and 4.1% of those age 65 or over.
