= Thompsontown, Pennsylvania =

Borough in Pennsylvania, US

- Borough
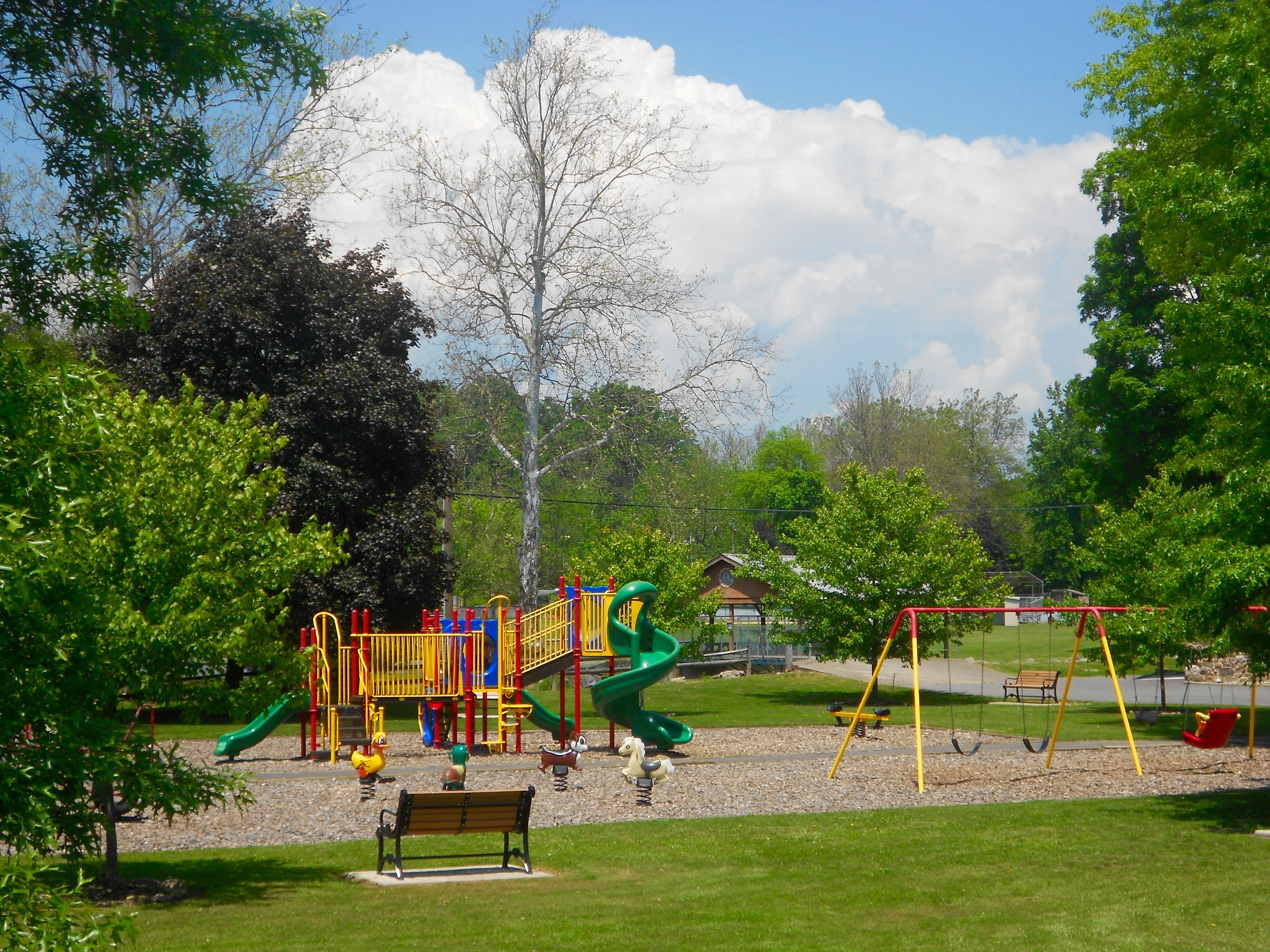
- Haldeman Park

- Seal

- Location of Thompsontown in Juniata County, Pennsylvania.

- Location within Pennsylvania Location within the United States
- Coordinates: 40°33′53″N 77°14′05″W
- Country: United States
- State: Pennsylvania
- County: Juniata
- Settled: 1755
- Incorporated: 1867

Area
  - Total: 0.32 sq mi (0.84 km^{2})
  - Land: 0.32 sq mi (0.84 km^{2})
  - Water: 0 sq mi (0.00 km^{2})
- Elevation (benchmark at center of borough): 447 ft (136 m)
- Highest elevation (northern boundary of borough): 680 ft (210 m)
- Lowest elevation (tributary to Juniata River): 420 ft (130 m)

Population (2020)
  - Total: 629 ▼
  - Estimate (2021): 623
  - Density: 2,037.4/sq mi (786.66/km^{2})
- Time zone: UTC-5 (Eastern (EST))
  - Summer (DST): UTC-4 (EDT)
- Zip code: 17094
- Area code: 717
- FIPS code: 42-76536
- Website: thompsontown.org

Thompsontown is a borough in Juniata County, Pennsylvania, United States. The population was 629 at the 2020 census.

== History ==
Thompsontown was founded in 1755 by William Thompson. It is home to the oldest church in Juniata County.

On January 14, 1988, a head-on collision between two Conrail freight trains occurred near Thompsontown, resulting into four deaths and two injuries.

== Geography ==
According to the United States Census Bureau, the borough has a total area of 0.3 square miles (0.78 km^{2}), all land.

Thompsontown is located in the eastern part of Juniata County and is surrounded by Delaware Township. Many of the town's residents commute to work in Harrisburg and Mifflintown.

== Demographics ==
Historical population
Census	Pop.	Note	%±
1850	232		—
1870	280		—
1880	280		0.0%
1890	291		3.9%
1900	273		−6.2%
1910	293		7.3%
1920	306		4.4%
1930	325		6.2%
1940	500		53.8%
1950	486		−2.8%
1960	713		46.7%
1970	677		−5.0%
1980	593		−12.4%
1990	582		−1.9%
2000	711		22.2%
2010	697		−2.0%
2020	631		−9.5%
2021 (est.)	623	▼	−1.3%

As of the census of 2000, there were 711 people, 348 households, and 202 families residing in the borough. The population density was 2,193.1 inhabitants per square mile (846.8/km^{2}). There were 371 housing units at an average density of 1,144.4 units per square mile (441.9 units/km^{2}). The racial makeup of the borough was 99.58% White, 0.14% Native American and 0.28% Asian. Hispanic or Latino of any race were 0.14% of the population.

There were 348 households, out of which 25.0% had children under the age of 18 living with them, 46.0% were married couples living together, 8.3% had a female householder with no husband present, and 41.7% were non-families. 37.4% of all households were made up of individuals, and 18.7% had someone living alone who was 65 years of age or older. The average household size was 2.04 and the average family size was 2.66.

In the borough the population was spread out, with 19.3% under the age of 18, 8.2% from 18 to 24, 29.4% from 25 to 44, 23.2% from 45 to 64, and 20.0% who were 65 years of age or older. The median age was 40 years. For every 100 females there were 89.6 males. For every 100 females age 18 and over, there were 85.8 males.

The median income for a household in the borough was $28,750, and the median income for a family was $35,938. Males had a median income of $32,115 versus $19,107 for females. The per capita income for the borough was $17,663. About 4.4% of families and 7.5% of the population were below the poverty line, including 6.8% of those under age 18 and 12.3% of those age 65 or over.
