= Boyers Run =

Physical characteristics
- Source
  - location: Narrow valley in Susquehanna Township, Juniata County, Pennsylvania
  - elevation: 736 ft (224 m)
- Mouth
  - location: Susquehanna River in Liverpool Township, Perry County, Pennsylvania near Liverpool
  - coordinates: 40°37′25″N 76°57′06″W
  - elevation: 387 ft (118 m)
- Length: 2.8 mi (4.5 km)
- Basin size: 1.63 mi^{2} (4.2 km^{2})

Basin features
- Progression: Susquehanna River → Chesapeake Bay
- Tributaries
  - right: one unnamed tributary

Boyers Run is a tributary of the Susquehanna River in Juniata County and Perry County, in Pennsylvania, in the United States. It is approximately 2.8 miles (4.5 km) long and flows through Susquehanna Township in Juniata County and Liverpool Township in Perry County. The watershed of the stream has an area of 1.63 square miles (4.2 km^{2}). The stream has one unnamed tributary and is not designated as an impaired waterbody. The drainage basin of Boyers Run is designated as a Warmwater Fishery and a Migratory Fishery.

== Course ==
Boyers Run begins in a narrow valley in Susquehanna Township, Juniata County, near the Juniata County/Perry County line. It flows east-northeast roughly parallel to the county line for a few miles. The stream then turns south for a short distance, leaving Susquehanna Township and Juniata County and entering Liverpool Township, Perry County. Here, it receives an unnamed tributary from the right and turns southeast. A short distance further downstream, the stream leaves its valley and turns east, crossing Pennsylvania Route 104 and then US Route 11/US Route 15 before reaching its confluence with the Susquehanna River.

Boyers Run joins the Susquehanna River 104.99 miles (168.97 km) upriver of its mouth.

== Hydrology, geography and geology ==
The elevation near the mouth of Boyers Run is 387 feet (118 m) above sea level. The elevation of the stream's source is 736 feet (224 m). Boyers Run is located to the south of Turkey Ridge.

Boyers Run is not designated as an impaired waterbody.

== Watershed and biology ==
The watershed of Boyers run has an area of 1.63 square miles (4.2 km^{2}). The stream is entirely within the United States Geological Survey quadrangle of Millersburg. Its mouth is located near Liverpool.

The drainage basin of Boyers Run is designated as a Warmwater Fishery and a Migratory Fishery.

== History ==
Boyers Run was entered into the Geographic Names Information System on August 2, 1979. Its identifier in the Geographic Names Information System is 1170099.

The Pennsylvania Department of Transportation was once issued an Encroachment permit to build and maintain a 9.5-mile (15.3 km) long section of US Route 11/US Route 15 impacting 4.95 acres (2.00 ha) of wetlands in the vicinity of Boyers Run and other streams, including Bargers Run and Mahantango Creek.

== See also ==
- Mahantango Creek, next tributary of the Susquehanna River going downriver
- Mahantango Creek (Snyder and Juniata Counties, Pennsylvania), next tributary of the Susquehanna River going upriver
- List of rivers of Pennsylvania
