= Leiningers Run =

Physical characteristics
- Source
  - location: valley in Greenwood Township, Juniata County, Pennsylvania
  - elevation: 801 ft (244 m)
- Mouth
  - location: West Branch Mahantango Creek in Susquehanna Township, Juniata County, Pennsylvania near Oriental
  - coordinates: 40°38′33″N 77°00′22″W
  - elevation: 459 ft (140 m)
- Length: 4.9 mi (7.9 km)
- Basin size: 6.96 sq mi (18.0 km^{2})

Basin features
- Progression: West Branch Mahantango Creek → Mahantango Creek → Susquehanna River → Chesapeake Bay
- Tributaries
  - left: five unnamed tributaries
  - right: three unnamed tributaries

Leiningers Run is a tributary of West Branch Mahantango Creek in Juniata County, Pennsylvania, in the United States. It is approximately 4.9 miles (7.9 km) long and flows through Greenwood Township and Susquehanna Township. The watershed of the stream has an area of 6.96 square miles (18.0 km^{2}). A reach of the stream is designated as an impaired waterbody due to miscellaneous habitat alteration from habitat modifications not including hydromodification. The stream's drainage basin is designated as a Coldwater Fishery and a Migratory Fishery.

== Course ==
Leiningers Run begins in a valley in Greenwood Township. It flows south-southeast for a few tenths of a mile and then turns east for a short distance before turning southeast. After several tenths of a mile, the stream turns east-southeast, receiving two unnamed tributaries from the right and one from the left before entering Susquehanna Township. It continues flowing east-southeast for a few tenths of a mile before turning east-northeast for several tenths of a mile, receiving one unnamed tributary from the right and two from the left before turning east. After a few tenths of a mile, the stream receives another unnamed tributary from the left before turning east-northeast again. After several tenths of a mile, it receives one more unnamed tributary from the left before eventually turning southeast and reaching the end of its valley. A short distance further downstream, the stream reaches its confluence with West Branch Mahantango Creek at the border between Juniata County and Snyder County.

Leiningers Run joins West Branch Mahantango Creek 3.26 miles (5.25 km) upstream of its mouth.

== Hydrology, geography and geology ==
The elevation near the mouth of Leiningers Run is 459 feet (140 m) above sea level. The elevation near the stream's source is 801 feet (244 m) above sea level.

A reach of Leiningers Run is designated as an impaired waterbody. The cause of impairment is miscellaneous habitat alterations and the probable source is habitat modification that is not hydromodification. One person has been issued a permit to discharge stormwater into an unnamed tributary of the stream during construction operations.

== Watershed and biology ==
The watershed of Leiningers Run has an area of 6.96 square miles (18.0 km^{2}). The stream is entirely within the United States Geological Survey quadrangle of Richfield. Its mouth is located within 1 mile (1.6 km) of Oriental.

Leiningers Run is one of the major streams in Susquehanna Township. There is agricultural land along the floodplain of the stream; this is one of the major areas of agriculture in Susquehanna Township, along with the floodplains of Dobson Run and the Susquehanna River.

== History ==
Leiningers Run was entered into the Geographic Names Information System on August 2, 1979. Its identifier in the Geographic Names Information System is 1179173.

A steel stringer/multi-beam or girder bridge carrying T-524 over Leiningers Run was constructed in 1930 and repaired in 2005. This bridge is 24.9 feet (7.6 m) long. A two-span bridge of the same type, but carrying T-415 across the stream, was built in 1939 and is 26.8 feet (8.2 m) long.

== Biology ==
The drainage basin of Leiningers Run is designated as a Coldwater Fishery and a Migratory Fishery. The stream's designated use is aquatic life.

There is a block of forested land with an area between 250 and 1,000 acres (100 and 400 ha) near the headwaters of Leiningers Run.

== See also ==
- Dobson Run, next tributary of West Branch Mahantango Creek going downstream
- Quaker Run (West Branch Mahantango Creek), next tributary of West Branch Mahantango Creek going upstream
- List of rivers of Pennsylvania
