= Dobson Run =

Physical characteristics
- Source
  - location: pond in a valley in Greenwood Township, Juniata County, Pennsylvania
  - elevation: 635 ft (194 m)
- Mouth
  - location: West Branch Mahantango Creek in Susquehanna Township, Juniata County, Pennsylvania on the Juniata/Snyder County line near Meiserville
  - coordinates: 40°38′11″N 76°59′53″W
  - elevation: 449 ft (137 m)
- Length: 5.1 mi (8.2 km)
- Basin size: 7.51 mi^{2} (19.5 km^{2})

Basin features
- Progression: West Branch Mahantango Creek → Mahantango Creek → Susquehanna River → Chesapeake Bay
- Tributaries
  - left: three unnamed tributaries
  - right: five unnamed tributaries

Dobson Run is a tributary of West Branch Mahantango Creek in Juniata County, Pennsylvania, in the United States. It is approximately 5.1 miles (8.2 km) long and flows through Greenwood Township and Susquehanna Township. The watershed of the stream has an area of 7.51 square miles (19.5 km^{2}). The stream has no named tributaries, but does have several unnamed tributaries. It is one of the main streams in Susquehanna Township. The stream's drainage basin is designated as a Coldwater Fishery and a Migratory Fishery.

== Course ==
Dobson Run begins in a pond in a valley in Greenwood Township. It flows east for several tenths of a mile, almost immediately passing through another pond, and later entering Susquehanna Township. It then heads in a roughly east-northeasterly direction for a few miles (though it flows in other directions for short distances at times). In this reach, the stream flows alongside Pennsylvania Route 235 and receives six unnamed tributaries, four from the right and two from the left. The stream then gradually turns in a generally northeasterly direction for some distance, receiving one unnamed tributary from the left and one from the right. It then turns in a generally north-northeasterly direction for several tenths of a mile before reaching its confluence with West Branch Mahantango Creek on the border between Juniata County and Snyder County.

Dobson Run joins West Branch Mahantango Creek 2.60 miles (4.18 km) upstream of its mouth.

== Geography and geology ==
The elevation near the mouth of Dobson Run is 449 feet (137 m) above sea level. The elevation of the stream's source is 635 feet (194 m) above sea level.

== Watershed and biology ==
The watershed of Dobson Run has an area of 7.51 square miles (19.5 km^{2}). The mouth of the stream is in the United States Geological Survey quadrangle of Dalmatia. However, its source is in the quadrangle of Reward. The stream's mouth is located near Meiserville.

Dobson Run is one of the major streams in Susquehanna Township. There is agricultural land along the floodplain of the stream; this is one of the major areas of agriculture in Susquehanna Township, along with the floodplains of Leiningers Run and the Susquehanna River.

The drainage basin of Dobson Run is designated as a Coldwater Fishery and a Migratory Fishery.

== History ==
Dobson Run was entered into the Geographic Names Information System on August 2, 1979. Its identifier in the Geographic Names Information System is 1173323.

An $88,000 bridge replacement project for a bridge carrying State Route 2023 over Dobson Run in Susquehanna Township was included in Juniata County's 2009 to 2012 Transportation Improvement Program. Dobson Run Farm once applied for a permit to replace and maintain two pipe crossings over the stream in the same township.

== See also ==
- Leiningers Run, next tributary of West Branch Mahantango Creek going upstream
- List of rivers of Pennsylvania
