= Quaker Run (West Branch Mahantango Creek tributary) =

Stream in Pennsylvania, US

Physical characteristics
- Source
  - location: Monroe Township, Juniata County, Pennsylvania
  - elevation: 820 ft (250 m)
- Mouth
  - location: West Branch Mahantango Creek in Monroe Township, Juniata County, Pennsylvania near Richfield
  - coordinates: 40°39′48″N 77°02′01″W
  - elevation: 522 ft (159 m)
- Length: 4.9 mi (7.9 km)
- Basin size: 4.57 sq mi (11.8 km^{2})

Basin features
- Progression: West Branch Mahantango Creek → Mahantango Creek → Susquehanna River → Chesapeake Bay
- Tributaries
  - left: four unnamed tributaries
  - right: one unnamed tributary

Quaker Run is a tributary of West Branch Mahantango Creek in Juniata County, Pennsylvania, in the United States. It is approximately 4.9 miles (7.9 km) long and flows through Monroe Township. The watershed of the stream has an area of 4.57 square miles (11.8 km^{2}). The stream has no named tributaries, but several unnamed tributaries, and is located largely between Graders Ridge and Dresslers Ridge. Its drainage basin is designated as a Coldwater Fishery and a Migratory Fishery.

== Course ==
Quaker Run begins to the east of a road in Monroe Township. It flows east-northeast through a valley for a few miles, flowing between Dresslers Ridge and Graders Ridge. In this reach, the stream receives an unnamed tributary from the left and eventually begins to meander, though still going in the same general direction, and receiving another unnamed tributary from the left. The stream eventually begins meandering in a generally easterly direction for more than a mile, receiving two unnamed tributaries from the left and two from the right. It continues flowing east and after a few tenths of a mile, it reaches the end of its valley. A short distance further downstream, the stream reaches its confluence with West Branch Mahantango Creek near the border between Juniata County and Snyder County.

Quaker Run joins West Branch Mahantango Creek 6.82 miles (10.98 km) upstream of its mouth.

== Geography and geology ==
The elevation near the mouth of Quaker Run is 522 feet (159 m) above sea level. The elevation near the stream's source is 820 feet (250 m).

Quaker Run is mostly situated between Dresslers Ridge to the south and Graders Ridge to the north, in eastern Monroe Township.

A series of gray shales exposed along Quaker Run and dipping 30 degrees southeast, has been observed. Gray and brown boulders of conglomerate containing some iron and white quartz have also been observed in the vicinity of the stream.

== Watershed and biology ==
The watershed of Quaker Run has an area of 4.57 square miles (11.8 km^{2}). The stream is entirely within the United States Geological Survey quadrangle of Richfield. Its mouth is located near Richfield.

Quaker Run is one of the main streams in Monroe Township, along with Stony Run and West Branch Mahantango Creek.

The drainage basin of Quaker Run is designated as a Coldwater Fishery and a Migratory Fishery. The stream is situated near a forested block of 250 to 1,000 acres (100 to 400 ha) on Graders Ridge.

== History ==
Quaker Run was entered into the Geographic Names Information System on August 2, 1979. Its identifier in the Geographic Names Information System is 1184524.

A schoolhouse was erected in the vicinity of Quaker Run in 1838.

A concrete culvert bridge carrying State Route 2018 over Quaker Run was constructed 3 miles (4.8 km) south of Richfield in 1990 and is 22.0 feet (6.7 m) long.

== See also ==
- Leiningers Run, next tributary of West Branch Mahantango Creek going downstream
- List of rivers of Pennsylvania
