= Bargers Run =

Bargers Run Bergers Run, Wildcat Creek

Physical characteristics
- Source
  - location: valley near the southern side of Wildcat Ridge in Greenwood Township, Perry County, Pennsylvania
  - elevation: 649 ft (198 m)
- Mouth
  - location: Susquehanna River in Liverpool, Perry County, Pennsylvania
  - coordinates: 40°34′01″N 76°59′32″W
  - elevation: 377 ft (115 m)
- Length: 5.9 mi (9.5 km)
- Basin size: 13.0 mi^{2} (34 km^{2})

Basin features
- Progression: Susquehanna River → Chesapeake Bay
- Tributaries
  - left: Barger Run
  - right: Spruce Run

Bargers Run (also known as Bergers Run or Wildcat Creek) is a tributary of the Susquehanna River in Perry County, Pennsylvania, in the United States. It is approximately 5.9 miles (9.5 km) long and flows through Greenwood Township, Liverpool Township, and Liverpool. The watershed of the stream has an area of 13.0 square miles (34 km^{2}). The stream has two named tributaries: Spruce Run and Barger Run. A number of bridges have been built across Bargers Run. Its watershed is designated as a Warmwater Fishery and a Migratory Fishery.

== Course ==
Bargers Run begins in a valley near the southern side of Wildcat Ridge, in Greenwood Township. It flows east-northeast for a short distance and enters Liverpool Township before turning east-southeast. A short distance further downstream, the stream turns southeast, heading away from Wildcat Ridge. Over the next several tenths of a mile, it receives four unnamed tributaries from the right and two from the left. It then turns east-northeast for a few miles. From the right, the stream receives two unnamed tributaries, then the tributary Spruce Run, then one more unnamed tributary from the right. From the left, it receives three unnamed tributaries. Bargers Run then turns northeast for several tenths of a mile, receiving the tributary Barger Run and an unnamed tributary from the left. It then turns south-southeast for a few tenths of a mile before turning northeast and then east, entering Liverpool. Here, the steam flows east for a few tenths of a mile before crossing US Route 11/US Route 15 and reaching its confluence with the Susquehanna River.

Bargers Run joins the Susquehanna River 100.24 miles (161.32 km) upriver of its mouth.

== Geography and geology ==
The elevation near the mouth of Bargers Run is 377 feet (115 m) above sea level. The elevation near the stream's source is 649 feet (198 m) above sea level.

Red sandstone of the Catskill Formation occurs in the vicinity of the valley of Bargers Run.

== Watershed ==
The watershed of Bargers Run has an area of 13.0 square miles (34 km^{2}). The mouth of the stream is in the United States Geological Survey quadrangle of Millersburg. However, its source is in the quadrangle of Reward. Its mouth is located at Liverpool.

The watershed of Bargers Run is situated in the northwestern portion of Perry County. The stream's watershed is bordered by the watersheds of several other streams, of which two drain into the Juniata River. However, Bargers Run is also one of several small streams in Perry County that drain into the Susquehanna River. It is one of the major steams in Liverpool Township and also drains a small area in eastern Greenwood Township.

== History and name ==
Bargers Run was entered into the Geographic Names Information System on August 2, 1979. Its identifier in the Geographic Names Information is 1168707. The stream is also known as Bergers Run or Wildcat Creek on United States Geological Survey maps. However, in 1959, it was found that every person who was asked knew the stream as "Bargers Run" and none recognized the name "Wildcat Creek". The name "Bargers Run" has been in use since the early 1800s.

A covered bridge known as Red Covered Bridge crosses Bargers Run. The bridge was built on the outskirts of Liverpool in 1886. At 55 feet (17 m) in length, it is the shortest covered bridge in Perry County.

A concrete tee beam bridge carrying Front Street over Bargers Run in Liverpool was constructed in 1922 and is 39.0 feet (11.9 m) long. A steel stringer/multi-beam or girder bridge carrying T-544 was constructed over the stream in 1940 and is 24.9 feet (7.6 m) long. In 1950, a concrete slab bridge carrying State Route 1010 was constructed over the stream, with a length of 25.9 feet (7.9 m). A concrete culvert bridge carrying Red Bridge Road across the stream was built in 1961 2 miles (3.2 km) west of Liverpool and is 29.9 feet (9.1 m) long. A prestressed box beam or girders bridge carrying US Route 11 and US Route 15 across the stream was built in Liverpool in 2000 and is 60.0 feet (18.3 m) long.

== Biology ==
The drainage basin of Bargers Run is designated as a Warmwater Fishery and a Migratory Fishery.

In August 1984, runoff from a hog manure lot caused approximately 4400 fish to die in a 1.5-mile (2.4 km) reach of Bargers Run. In 2016, the Pennsylvania Fish and Boat Commission passed regulations affecting Independence Run from its mouth to a point 0.5 miles (0.80 km) upstream. This regulation forbade any attempt to target or catch bass between May 1 and June 17, with immediate catch and release being in effect for bass the rest of the year.

== See also ==
- Mahantango Creek, next tributary of the Susquehanna River going upriver
- List of rivers of Pennsylvania
