= Quaker Run =

Quaker Run may refer to:

- Quaker Run (Shamokin Creek), in Northumberland County, Pennsylvania
- Quaker Run (West Branch Mahantango Creek), in Juniata County, Pennsylvania
