= Aline Creek =

Physical characteristics
- Source
  - location: hill in Perry Township, Snyder County, Pennsylvania
  - elevation: 734 ft (224 m)
- Mouth
  - location: North Branch Mahantango Creek in Perry Township, Snyder County, Pennsylvania near Troutwell
  - coordinates: 40°40′55″N 76°59′01″W
  - elevation: 463 ft (141 m)
- Length: 2.3 mi (3.7 km)
- Basin size: 1.61 mi^{2} (4.2 km^{2})

Basin features
- Progression: North Branch Mahantango Creek → Mahantango Creek → Susquehanna River → Chesapeake Bay
- Tributaries
  - left: one unnamed tributary

Aline Creek is a tributary of North Branch Mahantango Creek in Snyder County, Pennsylvania, in the United States. It is approximately 2.3 miles (3.7 km) long and flows through Perry Township. The watershed of the creek has an area of 1.61 square miles (4.2 km^{2}). The creek has no named tributaries, but does have one unnamed tributary. A reach of Aline Creek is designated as an impaired waterbody due to siltation/sedimentation from agriculture and removal of vegetation. The creek's drainage basin is designated as a Coldwater Fishery and a Migratory Fishery.

== Course ==
Aline Creek begins on a hill in Perry Township. It flows east-southeast for several tenths of a mile and enters a valley. It then turns northeast for several tenths of a mile before receiving an unnamed tributary from the left and soon afterwards turning east-northeast. After several tenths of a mile, the creek reaches the end of its valley and turns east. A short distance further downstream, it reaches its confluence with North Branch Mahantango Creek.

Aline Creek joins North Branch Mahantango Creek 2.92 miles (4.70 km) upstream of its mouth.

=== Tributaries ===
Aline Creek has no named tributaries. However, it has one unnamed tributary, which is approximately 0.6 miles (0.97 km) long and flows roughly east-southeast.

== Hydrology, geography and geology ==
The elevation near the mouth of Aline Creek is 463 feet (141 m) above sea level. The elevation of the creek's source is 734 feet (224 m) above sea level.

A reach of Aline Creek is designated as an impaired waterbody. The cause of the impairment is sedimentation/siltation and the likely sources of impairment are agriculture and removal of vegetation. Only a portion of the main stem is impaired; 1.25 miles (2.01 km) of Aline Creek and 0.65 miles (1.05 km) of its unnamed tributary attain their designated use.

== Watershed and biology ==
The watershed of Aline Creek has an area of 1.61 square miles (4.2 km^{2}). The mouth of the creek is in the United States Geological Survey quadrangle of Dalmatia. However, its source is in the quadrangle of Richfield. Its mouth is located within 1 mile (1.6 km) of Troutwell.

The drainage basin of Aline Creek is designated as a Coldwater Fishery and a Migratory Fishery. The designated use of the creek is aquatic life.

== History ==
Aline Creek was entered into the Geographic Names Information System on August 2, 1979. Its identifier in the Geographic Names Information System is 1168153.

A bridge carrying State Route 3016 over Aline Creek has been proposed for replacement.

== See also ==
- List of rivers of Pennsylvania
