= Red Covered Bridge (Liverpool, Pennsylvania) =

- U.S. National Register of Historic Places
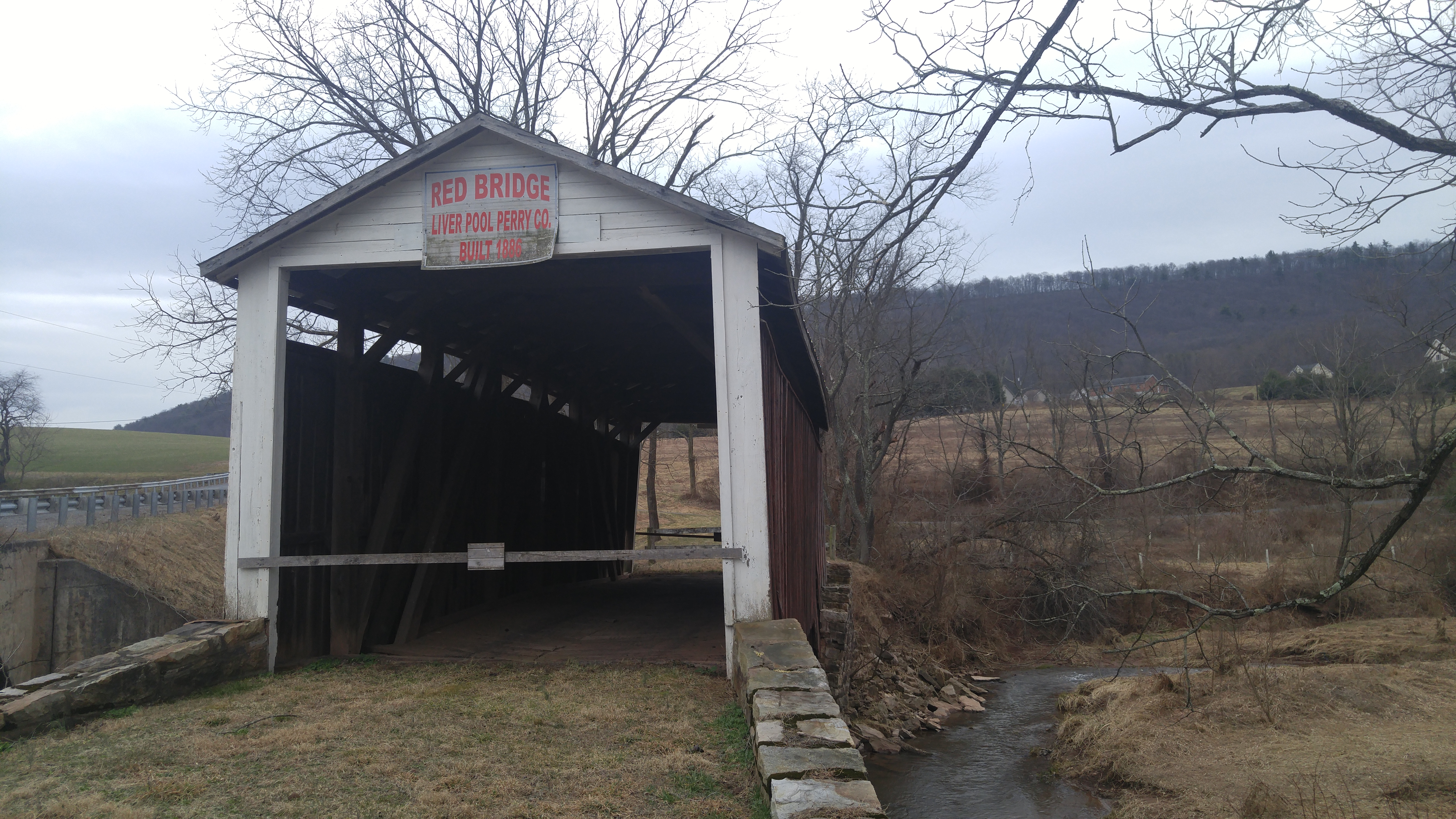

- Location within Pennsylvania Location within the United States
- Location: West of Liverpool, Pennsylvania on Red Bridge Road near the intersection of Sheaffer Road in Liverpool Township, Pennsylvania
- Coordinates: 40°34′4.5″N 77°0′54.6″W
- Area: 0.1 acres (0.040 ha)
- Built: 1886
- Architectural style: M. King, Queen
- MPS: Covered Bridges of Adams, Cumberland, and Perry Counties TR
- NRHP reference No.: 80003597
- Added to NRHP: August 25, 1980

The Red Covered Bridge is a historic, wooden covered bridge located in Liverpool Township in Perry County, Pennsylvania, USA. It is a 55-foot-long (17 m) King post bridge, constructed in 1886. It crosses Bargers Run.

It was listed on the National Register of Historic Places in 1980.
