= Greenwood Middle School =

Greenwood Middle School may refer to:

- Greenwood Middle School - Goldsboro, North Carolina - Wayne County Public Schools
- Greenwood Middle/High School - Millerstown, Pennsylvania - Greenwood School District
- Greenwood Community Middle School - Greenwood, Indiana - Greenwood Community School Corporation
