= Cocolamus Creek =

Stream in Pennsylvania, United States

Coordinates: 40°38′59″N 77°14′33″W

Cocolamus Creek is a 22.1-mile-long (35.6 km) tributary of the Juniata River in Juniata and Perry counties, Pennsylvania, in the United States.

Cocolamus Creek joins the Juniata River approximately 0.9 mile (1.4 km) downstream of the borough of Millerstown, approximately 16.5 miles (27 km) upstream of the Susquehanna River.

== Bridges ==
- The Dimmsville Covered Bridge crosses Cocolamus Creek at Greenwood Township, Pennsylvania.

== See also ==
- List of rivers of Pennsylvania
