= Dimmsville Covered Bridge =

Former bridge in Pennsylvania, United States

- U.S. National Register of Historic Places
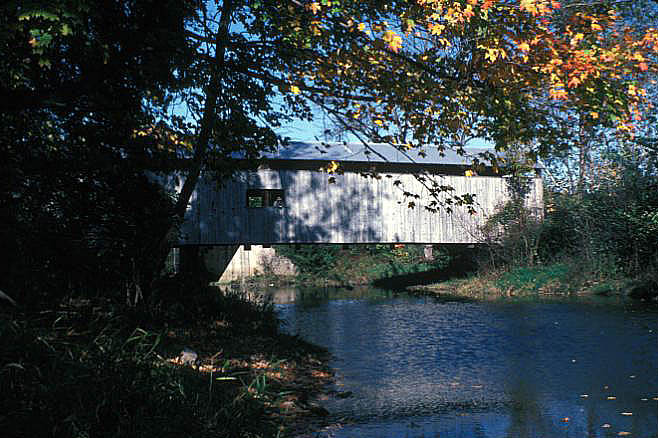
- Dimmsville Covered Bridge

- Location within Pennsylvania Location within the United States
- Location: West of Dimmsville, Greenwood Township, Pennsylvania
- Coordinates: 40°36′23″N 77°8′20″W
- Area: 0.1 acres (0.040 ha)
- Architectural style: Burr truss
- MPS: Covered Bridges of Juniata and Snyder Counties TR
- NRHP reference No.: 79002245
- Added to NRHP: August 10, 1979

The Dimmsville Covered Bridge was a historic covered bridge located near Dimmsville, Greenwood Township, Juniata County, Pennsylvania. It was a Burr Truss bridge. It measures 100-foot-long (30 m) and had vertical siding, windows at eave level, and a gable roof. It crossed Cocolamus Creek. It was listed on the National Register of Historic Places in 1979.

The bridge collapsed on April 11, 2017 after years of neglect.
