= North Branch Mahantango Creek =

Physical characteristics
- Source
  - location: Shade Mountain in West Perry Township, Pennsylvania
- Mouth
  - location: Mahantango Creek in Perry Chapman Townships, Snyder County, Pennsylvania
  - coordinates: 40°38′50″N 76°57′56″W
  - elevation: 438 ft (134 m)
- Length: 13.3 mi (21.4 km)
- Basin size: 37 mi^{2} (96 km^{2})

Basin features
- Progression: Mahantango Creek → Susquehanna River → Chesapeake Bay
- Tributaries
  - right: Aline Creek

North Branch Mahantango Creek is a tributary of Mahantango Creek in Snyder County, Pennsylvania, in the United States. It is 13.3 miles (21.4 km) long and flows through West Perry Township, Perry Township, and Chapman Township. The creek's mouth is at 438 feet (134 m) above sea level.

The ratio of nitrogen to phosphorus in North Branch Mahantango Creek is 18 to 1. The annual loads of sediment, nitrogen, and phosphorus in the part of the creek that is considered impaired by the Pennsylvania Department of Environmental Protection are 2,963,043 pounds (1,344,014 kg), 32,045.85 pounds (14,535.75 kg), and 1,807.092 pounds (819.683 kg), respectively. The main rock types in the watershed are shale, interbedded sedimentary rock, carbonate rock, and sandstone. The creek's watershed has an area of approximately 37 square miles.

== Course ==
North Branch Mahantango Creek begins in West Perry Township, Snyder County, on Shade Mountain in Bald Eagle State Forest. It flows south-southeast off Shade Mountain and then turns east and flows in Heister Valley between Chestnut Ridge and Lime Ridge. It receives a number of small and unnamed tributaries from the north and after several miles exits West Perry Township. Upon leaving West Perry Township, the creek enters Perry Township and continues flowing east for a short distance. It then reaches the community of Mount Pleasant Mills and turns southeast. The creek crosses Pennsylvania Route 35 and begins paralleling Pennsylvania Route 104, turning south shortly thereafter. It passes Potato Valley, where an unnamed tributary enters it from the west and then passes Buckwheat Valley (where another unnamed tributary enters it from the west) and the community of Shadle. It continues south, passing the Long Woods and receiving a tributary from Trout Valley. The creek then reaches Aline Creek and the community of Aline. A short distance downstream, it reaches the border between Perry Township and Chapman Township. The creek then flows along the border for a few miles, running parallel to Pennsylvania State Game Lands #194. It then reaches its confluence with Mahantango Creek.

=== Tributaries ===
Tributaries of North Branch Mahantango Creek include Aline Creek and a number of unnamed tributaries. Several tributaries are considered impaired according to the Pennsylvania Department of Environmental Protection.

== Chemical hydrology ==
A five square mile area of the watershed of North Branch Mahantango Creek is considered by the Pennsylvania Department of Environmental Protection to be impaired.

The part of the North Branch Mahantango Creek watershed that is impaired has an annual sediment load of 2,963,043 pounds (1,344,014 kg). The nitrogen load in this part of the watershed is 32,045.85 pounds (14,535.75 kg) per year and the annual phosphorus load is 1,807.092 pounds (819.683 kg). The annual sediment load in an unimpaired part of the watershed is 2,268,306.7 pounds (1,028,886.6 kg). The annual nitrogen load in this part of the watershed is 28,812.95 pounds (13,069.33 kg) and the phosphorus load is 1,418.8535 pounds (643.5811 kg) per year. The total maximum daily load of sediment in the watershed is 2,261,234 pounds (1,025,678 kg) per year and the total maximum daily load of phosphorus is 1,414 pounds (641 kg) per year.

The largest source of phosphorus in the part of the North Branch Mahantango Creek watershed that is impaired is cropland, which is responsible for loading 1,120 pounds (510 kg) per year into the creek. Other large sources of phosphorus in this part of the watershed include deciduous forest (316 pounds (143 kg) annually), hay and pastures (206 pounds (93 kg) per year), and groundwater (130 pounds (59 kg) per year). 21 pounds (9.5 kg) of phosphorus per year comes from a quarry, 11 pounds (5.0 kg) per year comes from septic systems, and 2 pounds (0.91 kg) per year comes from mixed forest. A total of 1 pound (0.45 kg) per year comes from coniferous forests and 0.2 pounds (0.091 kg) per year comes from "low-intensity development".

The largest contributor of nitrogen to the part of North Branch Mahantango Creek that is impaired is groundwater, which contributes 18,606 pounds (8,440 kg) per year to it. 8,352 pounds (3,788 kg) of nitrogen comes from cropland, 2,093 pounds (949 kg) comes from hay and pastures, and 2,011 pounds (912 kg) comes from deciduous forest. 748 pounds (339 kg) per year comes from septic systems, 188 pounds (85 kg) comes from quarries, 22 pounds (10.0 kg) comes from mixed forest, 12 pounds (5.4 kg) comes from coniferous forest, and 2 pounds (0.91 kg) per year comes from "low-intensity development".

The largest contributor of sediment to the part of North Branch Mahantango Creek that is impaired is cropland, which contributes 2,017,752 pounds (915,237 kg) per year to it. 604,497 pounds (274,195 kg) of sediment comes from deciduous forest, 316,361 pounds (143,499 kg) comes from hay and pastures, and 13,128 pounds (5,955 kg) comes from "low-intensity development". 10,458 pounds (4,744 kg) per year comes from a quarry, 2,899 pounds (1,315 kg) comes from mixed forest, 1,192 pounds (541 kg) comes from coniferous forest.

The ratio of nitrogen to phosphorus in North Branch Mahantango Creek is 18 to 1, making phosphorus a limiting nutrient. There is no point source pollution in the impaired part of the watershed.

== Geology, geography, and climate ==
In the impaired section of the watershed of North Branch Mahantango Creek, 38% of the surface rock is sandstone, 25% is carbonate, 24% is shale, and 12% is interbedded sedimentary rock. In an unimpaired portion of the watershed, 50% of the surface rock is sandstone, 34% is interbedded sedimentary rock, 10% is shale, and 6% is carbonate.

Sandstone lies under the northern part of the North Branch Mahantango Creek watershed's impaired section. South of the sandstone is shale. In the southern part of this section of the watershed, there is interbedded sedimentary rock and carbonate rock. A nearby unimpaired part of the watershed has a similar arrangement of rock.

The Mahantango Formation can be found in the watershed of North Branch Mahantango Creek and is named for the creek.

Most of the North Branch Mahantango Creek watershed is mountainous, with spurs and ridges. Its channel is sinuous and runs through rock formations consisting of limestone, sandstone, and shale.

North Branch Mahantango Creek is a limestone stream.

The annual precipitation in the watershed of North Branch Mahantango Creek is 105.62 centimetres (41.58 in), although it ranged from 40 to 45 inches (100 to 110 cm) in the early 1920s. The wettest month is June, when 10.83 centimetres (4.26 in) of precipitation falls. The driest month is February, when 6.25 centimetres (2.46 in) falls. The total annual runoff is 8.1 centimetres (3.2 in) and the annual streamflow is 53.4 centimetres (21.0 in). Streamflow occurs more in March than in any other month (8.5 centimetres (3.3 in)). The months with the least streamflow are July, August, and September, with 0.6 centimetres (0.24 in) of streamflow each. The creek's temperature is 68 °F (20 °C) upstream of Mount Pleasant Mills.

== Watershed ==
The watershed of North Branch Mahantango Creek has an area of approximately 37 square miles. According to the Susquehanna River Basin Commission, the creek's watershed is one of the highest-quality watersheds in the lower Susquehanna River watershed.

The most common land use in the impaired part of the watershed of North Branch Mahantango Creek is deciduous forest, which makes up 55.5% of the area. Cropland makes up 21.1% of this part of the watershed and hay and pastures make up 17.3% of it. 3.7% is mixed forest, and 2.5% is coniferous forest. 0.5% of the land (a quarry) is considered "high-intensity development" by the Pennsylvania Department of Environmental Protection. 0.2% of the land is considered "low-intensity development" by the Pennsylvania Department of Environmental Protection. An unimpaired portion of the creek's watershed includes of 58.5% deciduous forest, 21.1% cropland, 11.9% hay and pasture, 4.2% coniferous forest, and 3.2% mixed forest. The remaining 0.7% of this part of the watershed's area consists of 0.5% "low-intensity development" and 0.2% "high-intensity development".

Nearly all of the northern part of the impaired portion of the watershed of North Branch Mahantango Creek is forested and most of the southern part is agricultural or developed. A nearby unimpaired part of the creek's watershed has the same layout. Both parts of the watershed have wetlands.

The elevation of North Branch Mahantango Creek's mouth is 438 feet (134 m) above sea level. Its elevation decreases at a rate of 40.2 feet (12.3 m) per mile as it flows from its source to its mouth.

== History ==
In the early 1920s, agriculture was the main industry in the watershed of West Branch Mahantango Creek. The creek also powered several small gristmills at this time.

The Aline Covered Bridge was built over North Branch Mahantango Creek in 1884. It is a burr truss bridge that is 67 feet (20 m) long.

Mahantango Creek's name comes from the Delaware word mahantongo, meaning "where we had plenty to eat".

== Biology ==
North Branch Mahantango Creek is stocked with trout. Moderate numbers of brown trout and some young of the year inhabit it. Herds of livestock can freely access the creek. It lacks a protected riparian buffer.

In his book Trout Unlimited's Guide to Pennsylvania Limestone Streams, A. Joseph Armstrong said that North Branch Mahantango Creek "doesn't rival the Little Lehigh or Fishing Creek, but it is an honest-to-goodness limestone stream" and that it "is not an important stream, but in this relatively barren part of the Commonwealth it is worth keeping in mind if you can't fish elsewhere."

== See also ==
- West Branch Mahantango Creek, the other tributary of Mahantango Creek
- List of rivers of Pennsylvania
