= Greenwood Township, Juniata County, Pennsylvania =

Township in Pennsylvania, US

Coordinates: 40°37′00″N 77°06′59″W

- Township
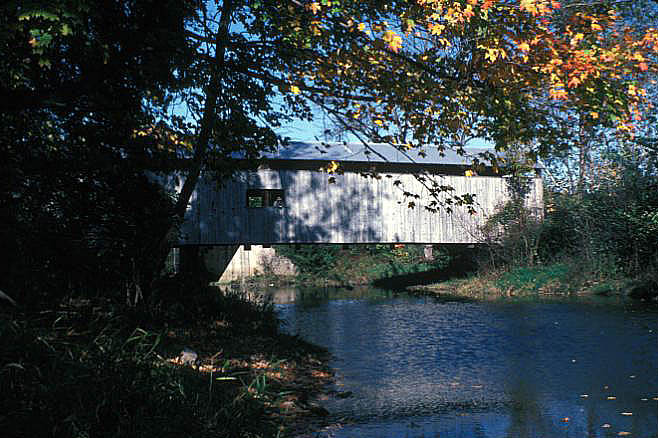
- Dimmsville Covered Bridge

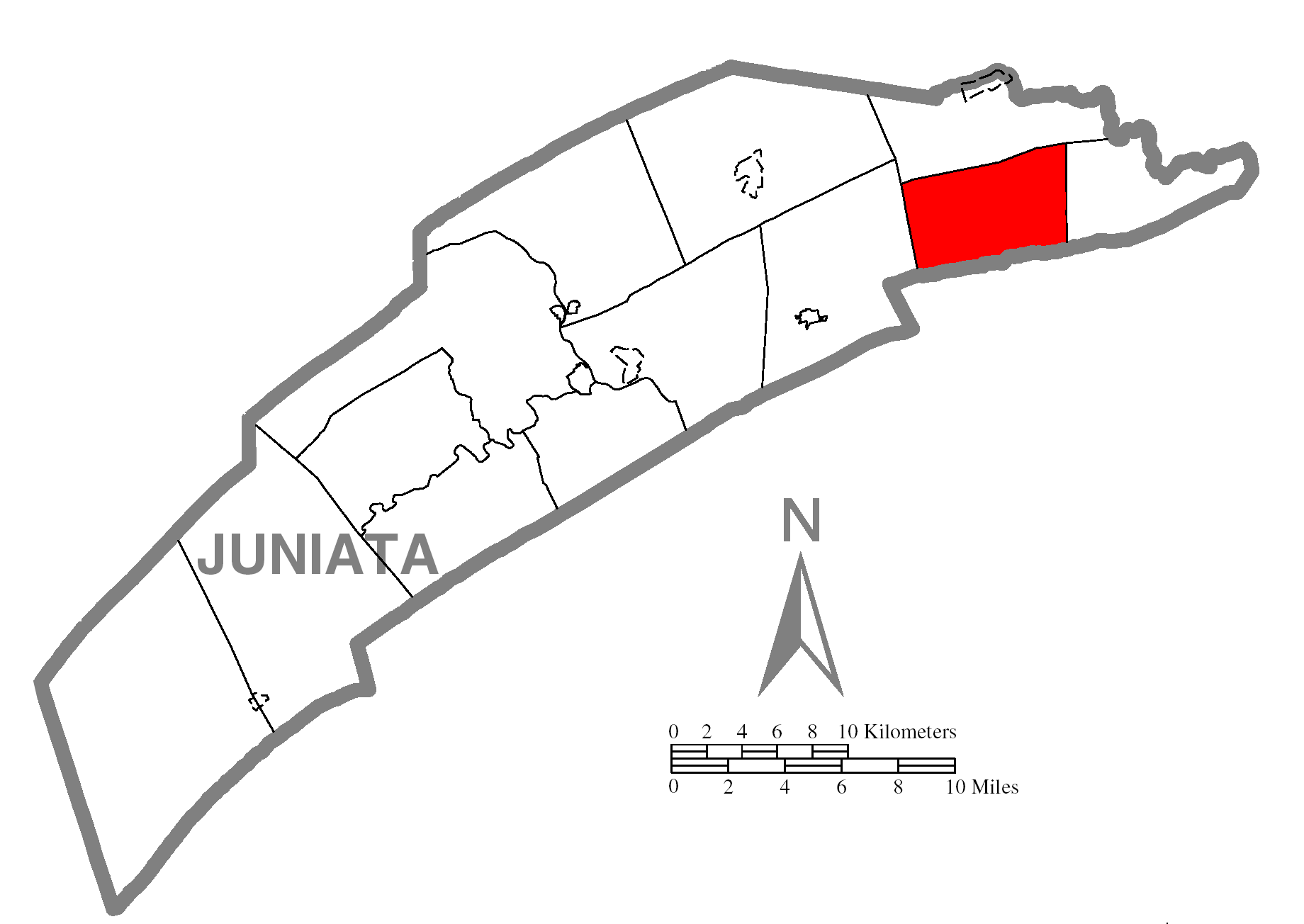
- Map of Juniata County, Pennsylvania highlighting Greenwood Township

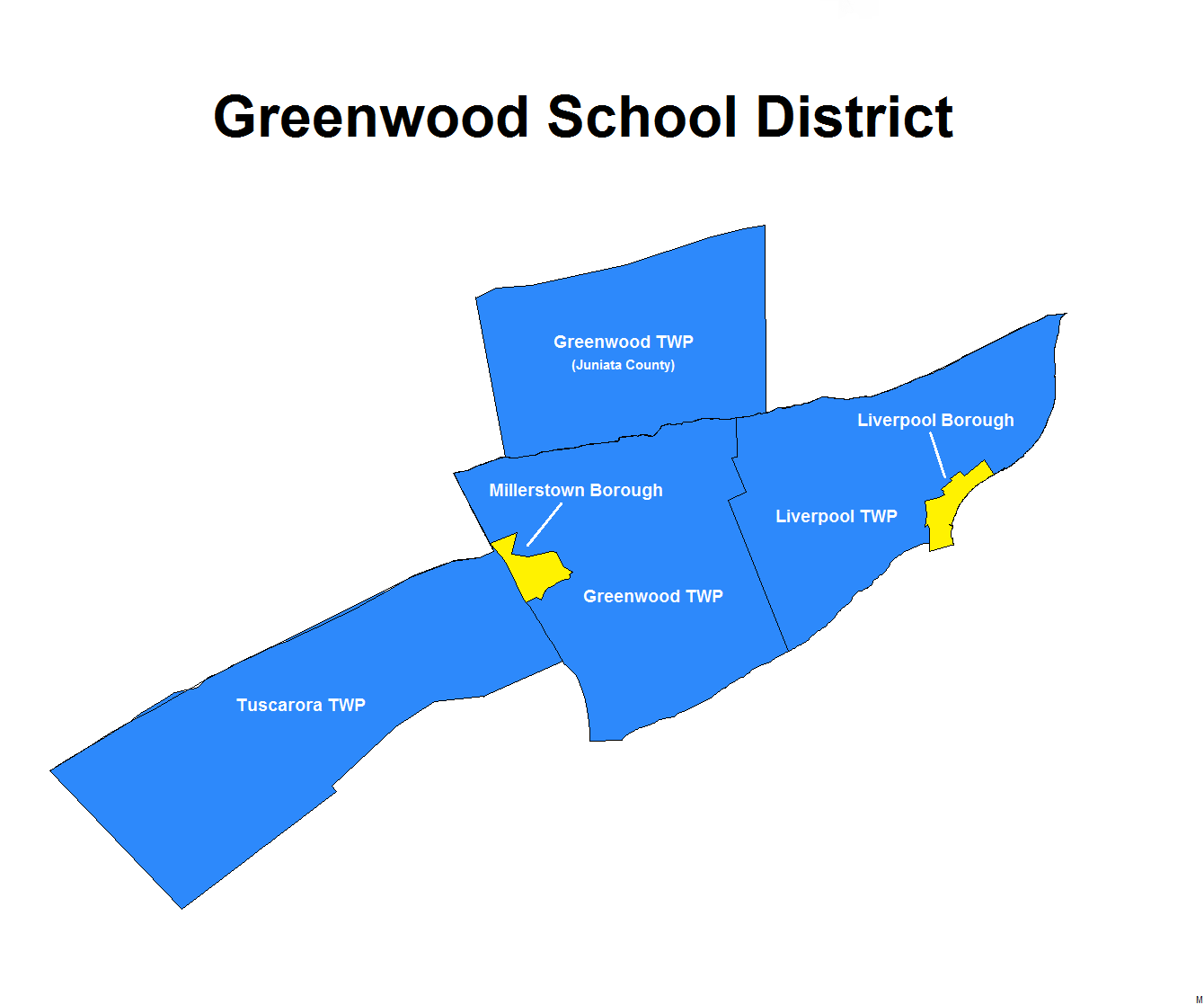
- Map of Juniata County, Pennsylvania Greenwood Township is one of six municipalities encompassed by the Greenwood School District.
- Country: United States
- State: Pennsylvania
- County: Juniata
- Settled: 1763
- Incorporated: 1767

Area
  - Total: 19.46 sq mi (50.40 km^{2})
  - Land: 19.46 sq mi (50.40 km^{2})
  - Water: 0 sq mi (0.00 km^{2})

Population (2020)
  - Total: 533 ▼
  - Estimate (2022): 539
  - Density: 32.2/sq mi (12.44/km^{2})
- Time zone: UTC-5 (EST)
  - Summer (DST): UTC-4 (EDT)
- Zip code: 17062
- Area code: 717
- FIPS code: 42-067-31424

Greenwood Township is a township in Juniata County, Pennsylvania, United States. The population was 533 at the 2020 census, an increase over the figure of 617 tabulated in 2010.

== History ==
The Dimmsville Covered Bridge was listed on the National Register of Historic Places in 1979. It collapsed in 2017.

== Geography ==
Greenwood Township is in eastern Juniata County and is centered on Turkey Valley, with Shellys Ridge and Lock Ridge to the south. Cocolamus Creek, a tributary of the Juniata River, flows through the western part of the township. According to the United States Census Bureau, the township has a total area of 19.5 square miles (50.4 km^{2}), of which 0.9 acres (3,723 m^{2}), or 0.01%, are water.

Greenwood Township is bordered by Monroe Township to the north, Susquehanna Township to the east, Greenwood Township, Perry County to the south, and Delaware Township to the west. Unincorporated communities in the township include Seven Stars and Dimmsville.

Pennsylvania Route 235 passes through the township, leading east to Liverpool on the Susquehanna River, and west to East Salem.

== Demographics ==
Historical population
Census	Pop.	Note	%±
1850	1,651		—
1860	635		−61.5%
1870	744		17.2%
1880	601		−19.2%
1890	569		−5.3%
1900	563		−1.1%
1910	447		−20.6%
1920	433		−3.1%
1930	349		−19.4%
1940	357		2.3%
1950	286		−19.9%
1960	353		23.4%
1970	387		9.6%
1980	486		25.6%
1990	493		1.4%
2000	548		11.2%
2010	617		12.6%
2020	533		−13.6%
2022 (est.)	539		1.1%
U.S. Decennial Census

As of the census of 2000, there were 548 people, 194 households, and 152 families residing in the township. The population density was 27.9 inhabitants per square mile (10.8/km^{2}). There were 223 housing units at an average density of 11.3/sq mi (4.4/km^{2}). The racial makeup of the township was 98.54% White, 0.73% African American, 0.18% Asian, and 0.55% from two or more races. Hispanic or Latino of any race were 0.73% of the population.

There were 194 households, out of which 33.0% had children under the age of 18 living with them, 74.7% were married couples living together, 2.1% had a female householder with no husband present, and 21.6% were non-families. 16.5% of all households were made up of individuals, and 7.7% had someone living alone who was 65 years of age or older. The average household size was 2.82 and the average family size was 3.24.

In the township the population was spread out, with 27.0% under the age of 18, 6.9% from 18 to 24, 27.6% from 25 to 44, 25.7% from 45 to 64, and 12.8% who were 65 years of age or older. The median age was 38 years. For every 100 females there were 105.2 males. For every 100 females age 18 and over, there were 99.0 males.

The median income for a household in the township was $40,139, and the median income for a family was $40,417. Males had a median income of $32,054 versus $20,875 for females. The per capita income for the township was $17,344. About 5.0% of families and 7.0% of the population were below the poverty line, including 5.4% of those under age 18 and 5.5% of those age 65 or over.
