= Greenwood School District (Pennsylvania) =

School district in Pennsylvania, U.S.

Coordinates: 40.55267°N 77.15037°W

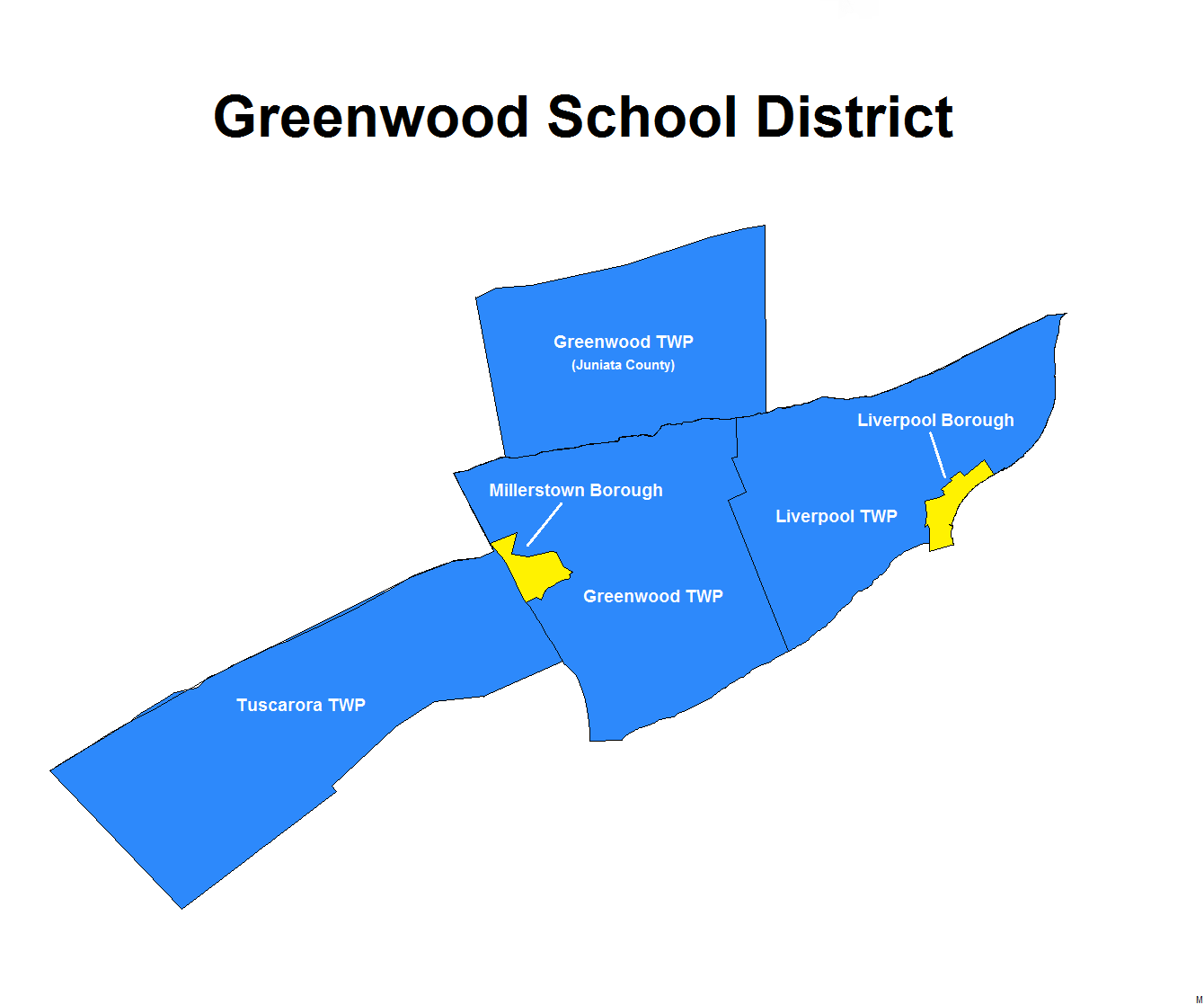
- District boundaries in Perry and Juniata County, six included municipalities

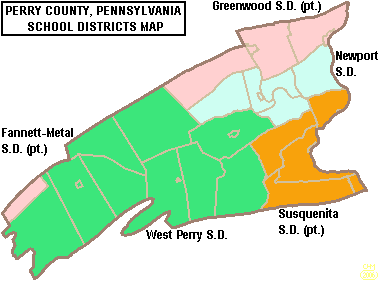

Address
- 405 East Sunbury Street Millerstown, Perry County, Juniata County, Pennsylvania; United States

Students and staff
- District mascot: Wildcats
- Colors: Blue & Gold

Other information
- Website: www.greenwoodsd.org

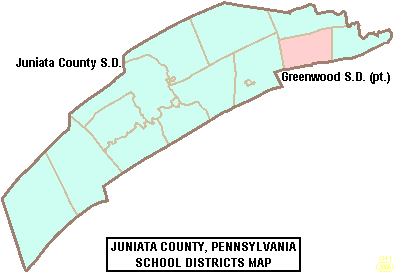
Map of Juniata County School Districts

The Greenwood School District is a small, rural, public school district which is located in Millerstown, Pennsylvania. The northernmost school district in Perry County, Pennsylvania, it is bordered to the north by the Juniata County School District, to the east by the Susquehanna River, to the south by the Newport School District, and to the west by the West Perry School District.

== Overview ==
Encompassing approximately 99 square miles (260 km^{2}), Greenwood School District serves residents of Millerstown Borough, Liverpool Borough, Greenwood Township, Liverpool Township, and Tuscarora Township in Perry County, as well as Greenwood Township, Juniata County.

The total population of the Greenwood School District in 2007 was 5,235 per the US Census Bureau. According to the 2010 Census by the US Census Bureau, the District served a resident population of 5,492. The educational attainment levels for the Greenwood School District population (25 years old and over) were 86.7% high school graduates and 14.8% college graduates.

According to the Pennsylvania Budget and Policy Center, 25.6% of the District's pupils lived at 185% or below the Federal Poverty level as shown by their eligibility for the federal free or reduced price school meal programs in 2012. In 2013, the Pennsylvania Department of Education, reported that no students in the Greenwood School District were homeless. In 2009, Greenwood School District residents' per capita income was $18,424 a year, while the median family income was $46,932. In the Commonwealth, the median family income was $49,501 and the United States median family income was $49,445, in 2010. In Perry County, the median household income was $57,375. By 2013, the median household income in the United States rose to $52,100. In 2014, the median household income in the USA was $53,700.

The Greenwood School District operates two schools: the Greenwood Middle/High School and Greenwood Elementary School, which are both located in the borough of Millerstown, Pennsylvania on Pennsylvania Route 17. The elementary school has a population of approximately 350 students in grades K-6. The middle school/high school has a population of approximately 300 students in 2007.

High school students may choose to attend Cumberland Perry Area Vocational Technical School (CPAVTS), located in Mechanicsburg, for training in the construction and mechanical trades; the culinary arts, technology related careers and allied health services. The Greenwood School District is served by the Capital Area Intermediate Unit 15 which offers a variety of services, including a completely developed K-12 curriculum that is mapped and aligned with the Pennsylvania Academic Standards (available online), shared services, a group purchasing program and a wide variety of special education and special needs services. Students may also choose to take classes offered through the online Capital Area Online Learning Association (CAOLA) which is operated by the CAIU15.

== Extracurriculars ==
The district had a boys' basketball team that made it to the "State A Semi-finals" in 2006 and 2010. Greenwood School District currently has an athletic partnership with Newport High School for football, track, soccer, and wrestling.

Greenwood School District provides a wide variety of clubs, activities and sports.

=== Sports ===
The District funds:

Boys'

- Baseball – A
- Basketball- A
- Soccer – AA (Co-Op with Newport School District)
- Track and Field - AA (Co-Op with Halifax and Newport School Districts)

Girls'

- Basketball – A
- Cheer – AAAA (added 2014)
- Field Hockey – AA
- Softball – A
- Track and Field – AA

Middle School sports:

Boys'

- Basketball
- Soccer

Girls'

- Basketball
- Field Hockey

According to PIAA directory July 2014
