= Greenwood Township, Perry County, Pennsylvania =

Township in Pennsylvania, US

Coordinates: 40°33′00″N 77°06′59″W

- Township
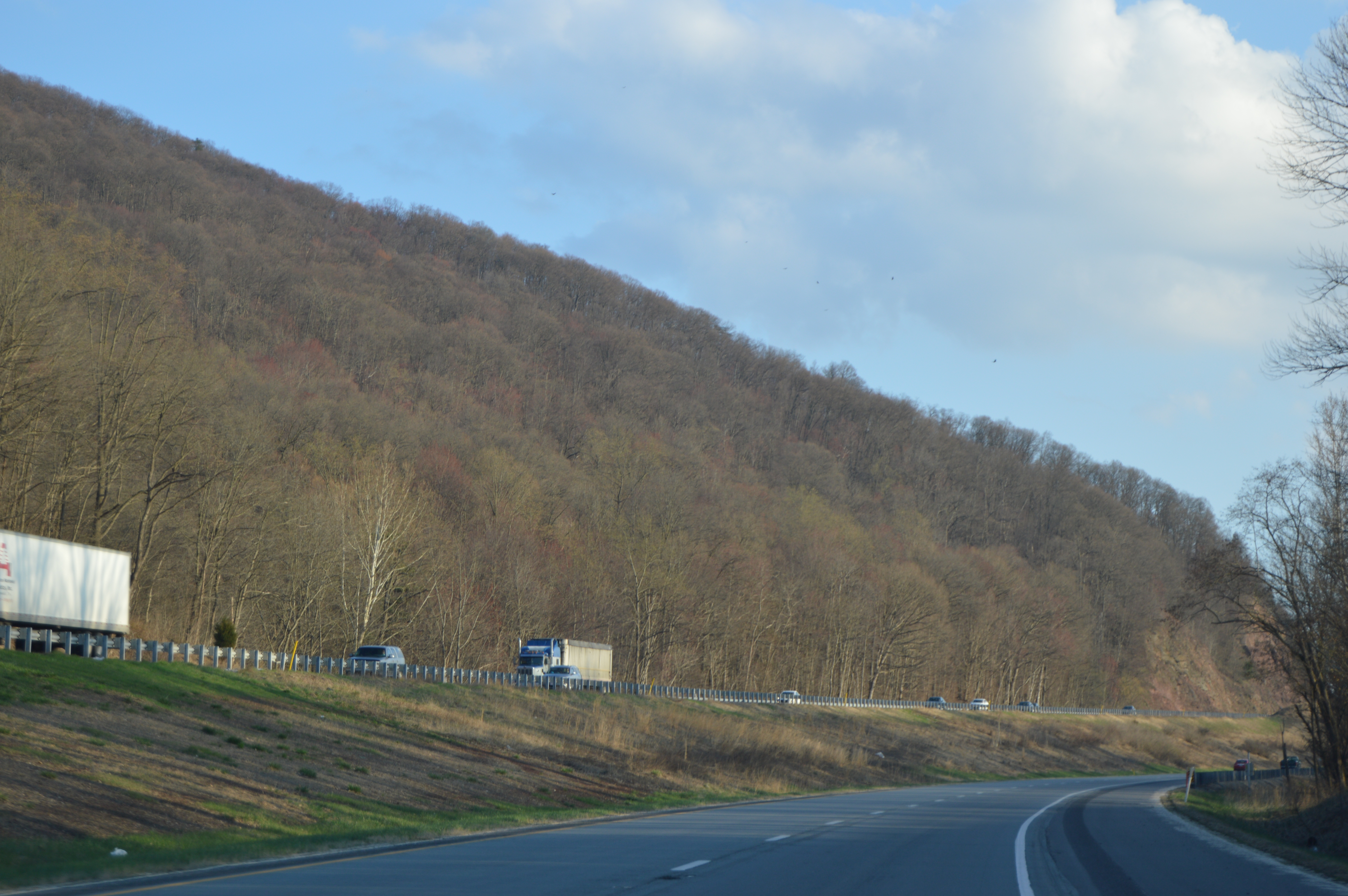
- Buffalo Mountain, which defines the southern border of Greenwood Township, as seen from the north on U.S. Routes 22/322

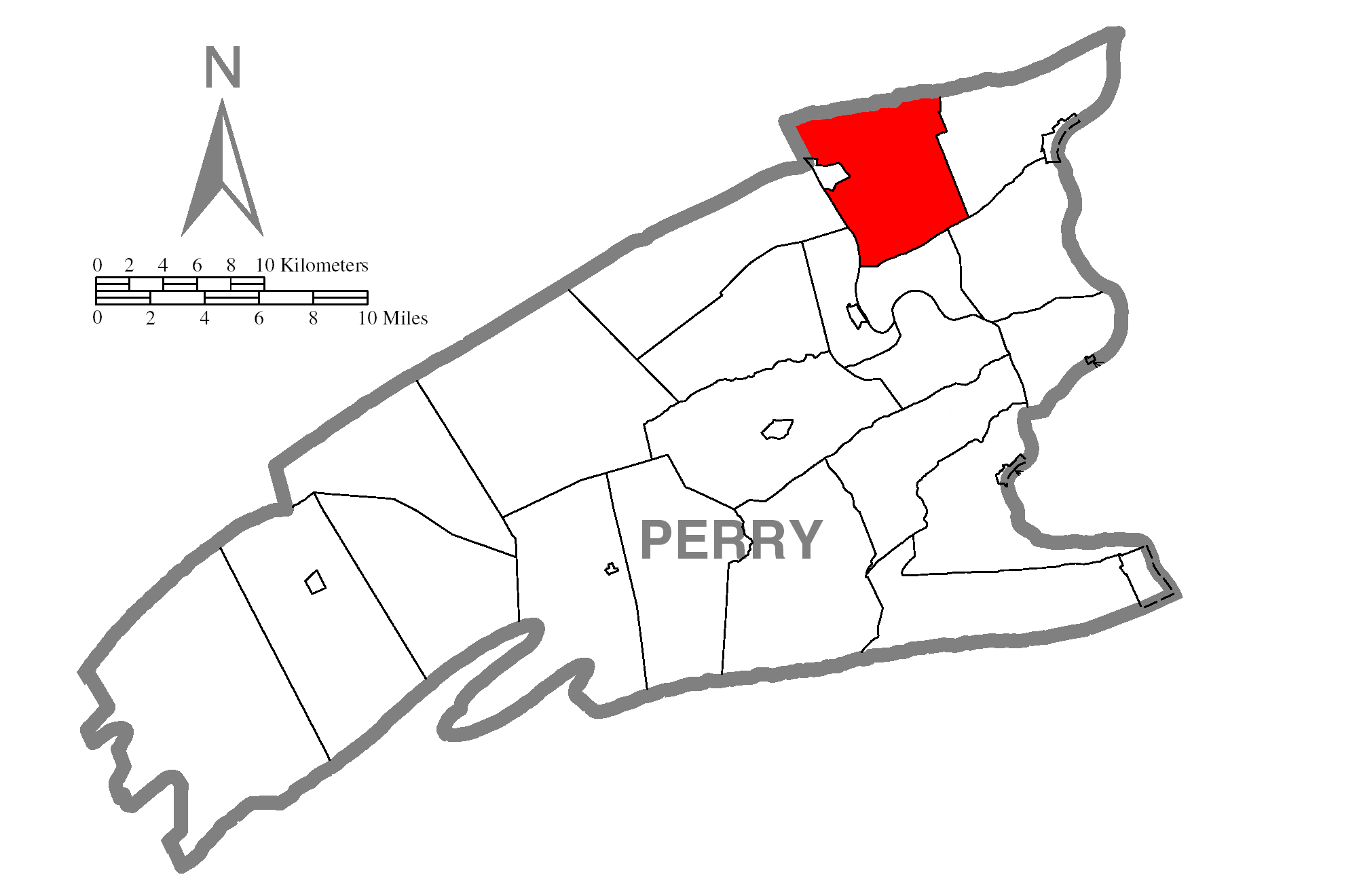
- Map of Perry County, Pennsylvania highlighting Greenwood Township

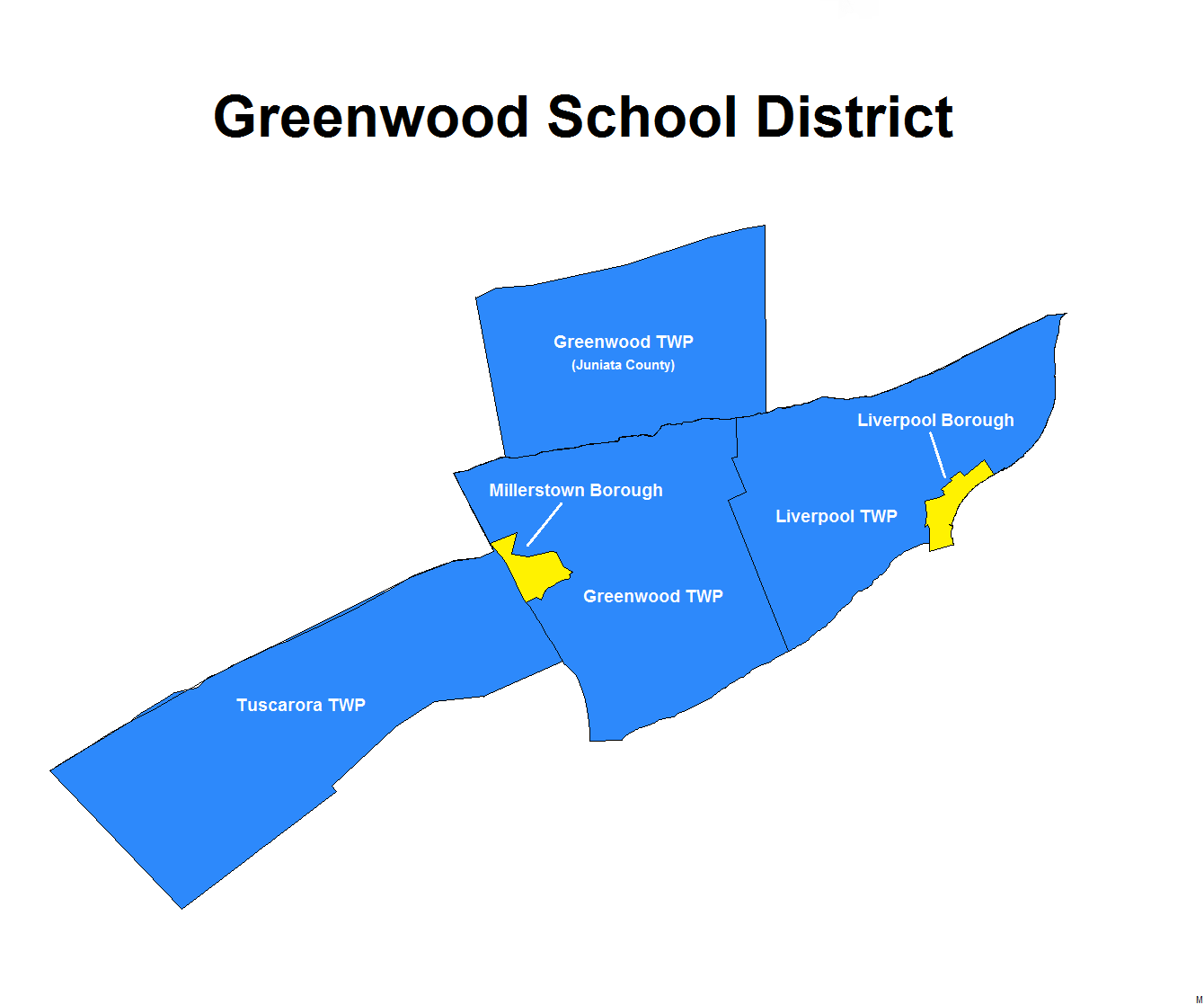
- Map of Perry County, Pennsylvania Greenwood Township is one of six municipalities encompassed by the Greenwood School District.
- Country: United States
- State: Pennsylvania
- County: Perry
- Settled: 1755
- Incorporated: 1767

Area
  - Total: 25.34 sq mi (65.64 km^{2})
  - Land: 25.06 sq mi (64.91 km^{2})
  - Water: 0.28 sq mi (0.73 km^{2})

Population (2020)
  - Total: 1,034 ▲
  - Estimate (2023): 1,042
  - Density: 39.7/sq mi (15.31/km^{2})
- Time zone: UTC-5 (Eastern (EST))
  - Summer (DST): UTC-4 (EDT)
- Zip code: 17062
- Area codes: 717, 223
- FIPS code: 42-099-31440

Greenwood Township is a township in Perry County, Pennsylvania, United States. The population was 1,034 at the 2020 census.

== History ==
Greenwood Township was formed from old Fermanagh Township, Cumberland County on March 25, 1767, the fourth of the original townships formed within what would be separated as Perry County. It was named for Joseph Greenwood, an early settler. After many partitions, Fermanaugh Township is in Juniata County. After many partitions, Greenwood Township has been reduced to its current boundaries.

== Geography ==
According to the United States Census Bureau, the township has a total area of 25.4 square miles (66 km^{2}), of which 25.2 square miles (65 km^{2}) is land and 0.2 square miles (0.52 km^{2}) (0.59%) is water. The borough of Millerstown became part of the western border of the township when it separated from the township in 1849. One church in Greenwood Township remains of the three that began in the unincorporated agrarian community of Pfoutz Valley, which spans from the northern sections of the township, into adjoining northwestern Liverpool Township.

== Demographics ==
Historical population
Census	Pop.	Note	%±
2010	998		—
2020	1,034		3.6%
2023 (est.)	1,042		0.8%
U.S. Decennial Census

As of the census of 2000, there were 1,010 people, 381 households, and 296 families living in the township. The population density was 40.1 inhabitants per square mile (15.5/km^{2}). There were 409 housing units at an average density of 16.2/sq mi (6.3/km^{2}). The racial makeup of the township was 99.60% White, 0.10% African American, and 0.30% from two or more races. Hispanic or Latino of any race were 0.99% of the population.

There were 381 households, out of which 32.8% had children under the age of 18 living with them, 68.0% were married couples living together, 4.7% had a female householder with no husband present, and 22.3% were non-families. 18.6% of all households were made up of individuals, and 10.8% had someone living alone who was 65 years of age or older. The average household size was 2.65 and the average family size was 3.00.

In the township the population was spread out, with 25.1% under the age of 18, 7.0% from 18 to 24, 29.3% from 25 to 44, 25.7% from 45 to 64, and 12.8% who were 65 years of age or older. The median age was 38 years. For every 100 females there were 106.5 males. For every 100 females age 18 and over, there were 108.3 males.

The median income for a household in the township was $45,694, and the median income for a family was $53,000. Males had a median income of $38,158 versus $26,250 for females. The per capita income for the township was $18,765. About 2.1% of families and 6.5% of the population were below the poverty line, including 7.2% of those under age 18 and 4.8% of those age 65 or over.
