= Liverpool Township, Perry County, Pennsylvania =

Township in Pennsylvania, US

Coordinates: 40°35′00″N 77°00′59″W

Liverpool Township, Pennsylvania
- Township
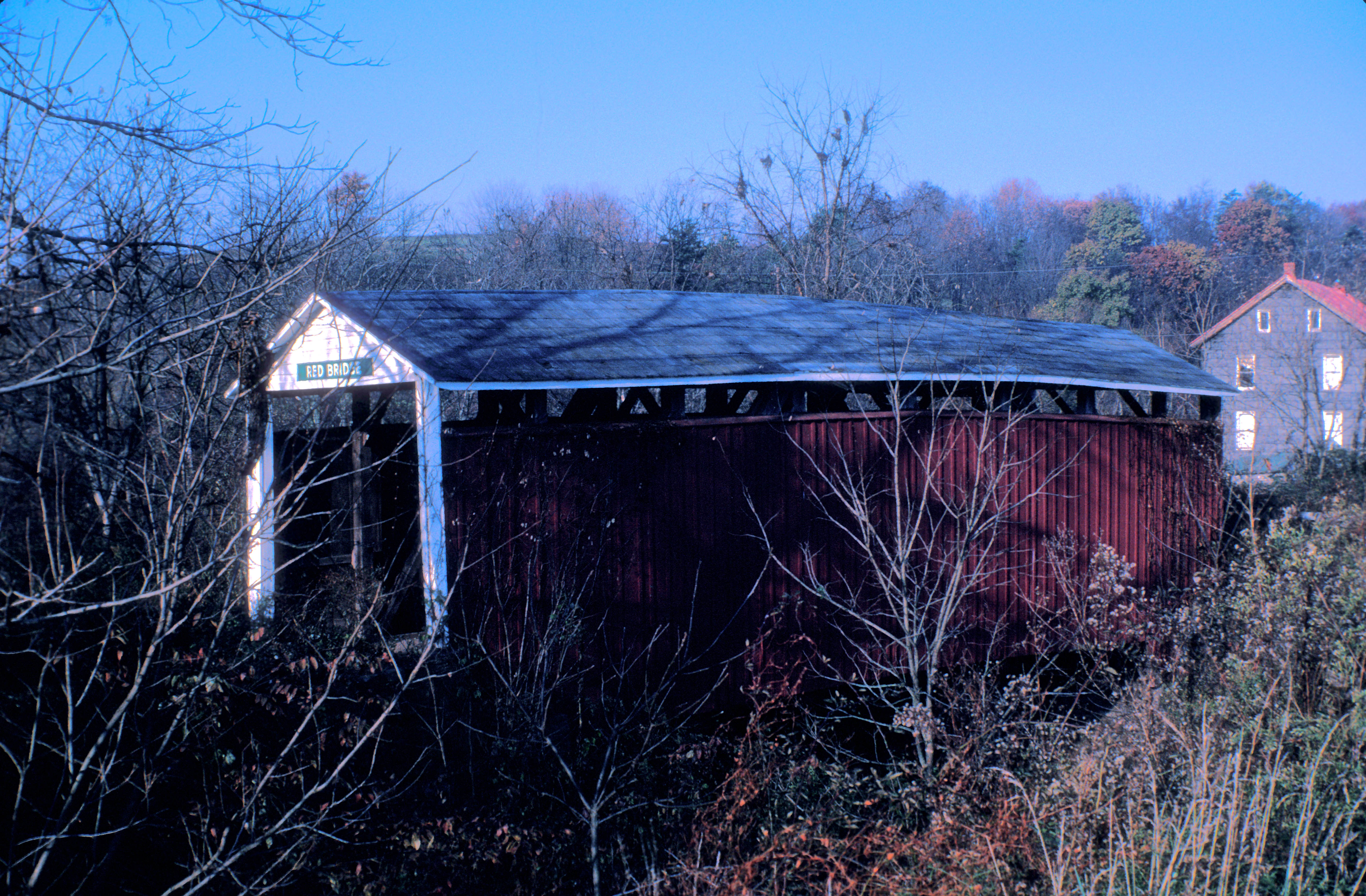
- Red Covered Bridge

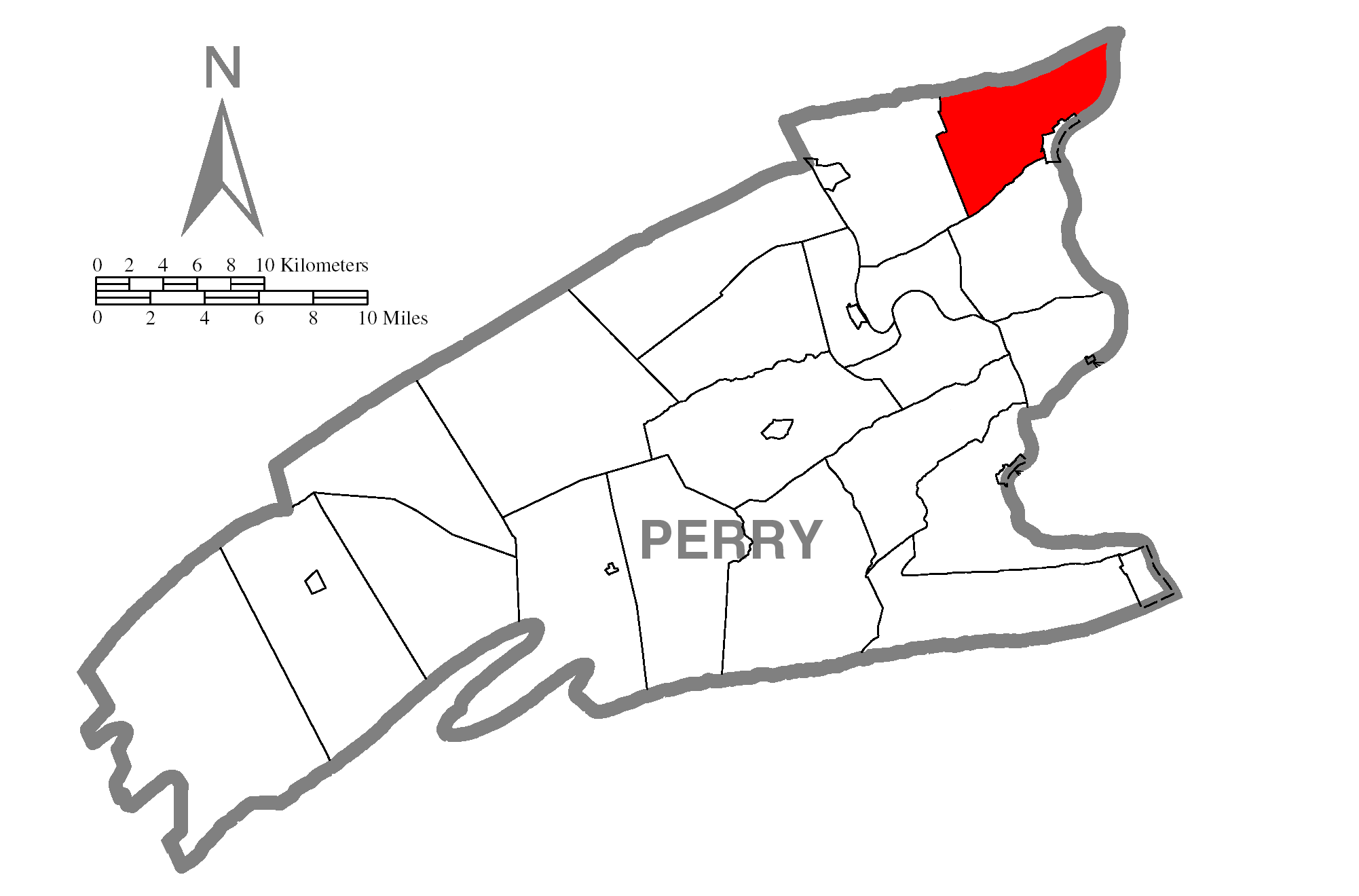
- Map of Perry County, Pennsylvania highlighting Liverpool Township

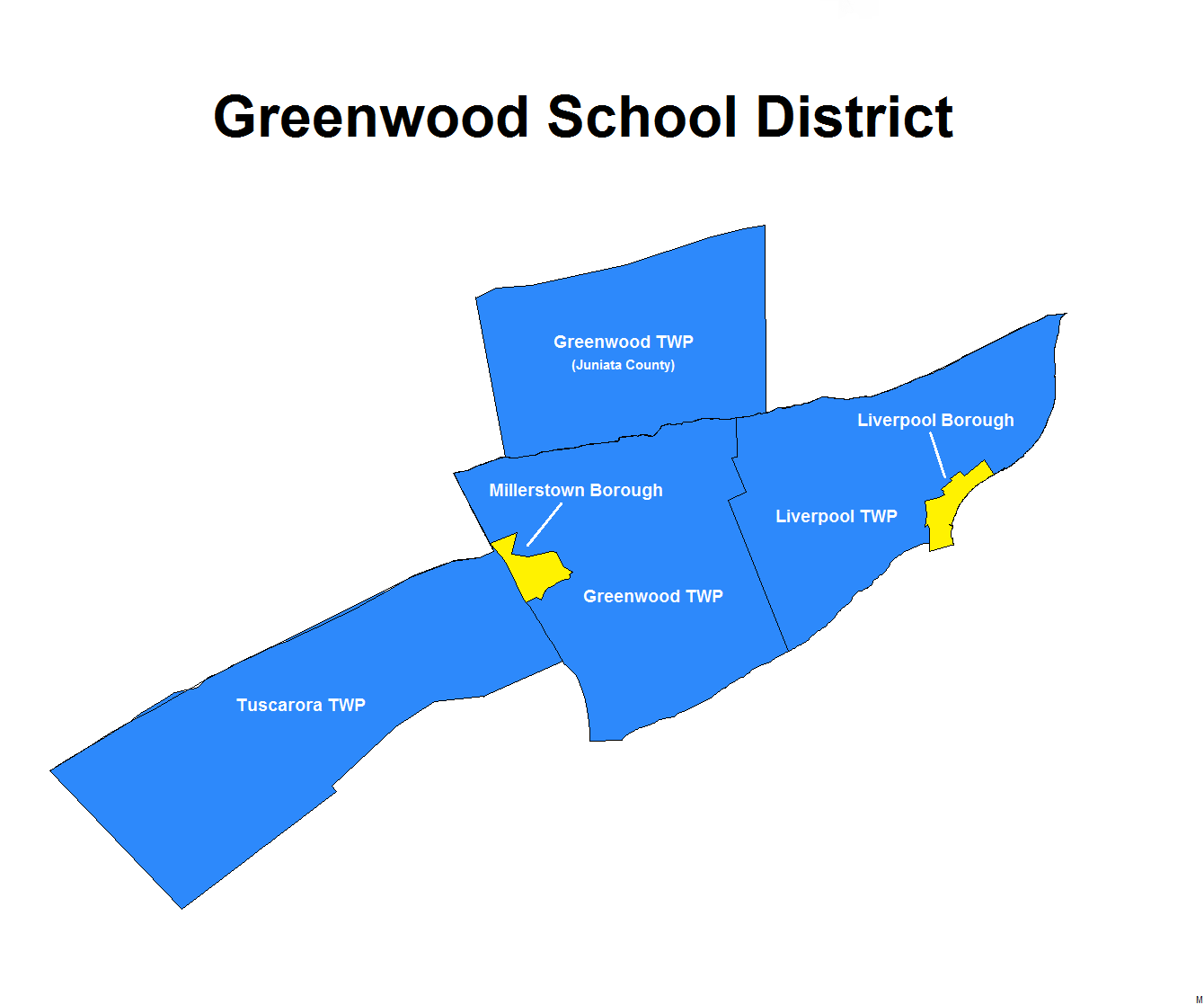
- Map of Perry County, Pennsylvania Liverpool Township is one of six municipalities encompassed by the Greenwood School District.
- Country: United States
- State: Pennsylvania
- County: Perry
- Settled: 1755
- Incorporated: 123

Area
  - Total: 20.94 sq mi (54.24 km^{2})
  - Land: 20.91 sq mi (54.16 km^{2})
  - Water: 0.027 sq mi (0.07 km^{2})

Population (2020)
  - Total: 1,036 ▼
  - Estimate (2023): 1,044
  - Density: 50.3/sq mi (19.42/km^{2})
- Time zone: UTC-5 (Eastern (EST))
  - Summer (DST): UTC-4 (EDT)
- Area code: 717
- FIPS code: 42-099-43976

Liverpool Township is a township in Perry County, Pennsylvania, United States. The population was 1,036 at the 2020 census. It is not to be confused with the borough of Liverpool, which is adjacent.

== History ==
In 1823, Liverpool Township was partitioned from adjoining Greenwood Township, which diminished the importance of Centerville while increasing that of Liverpool (which incorporated as a borough in 1832) within Liverpool Township, and Millerstown in Greenwood Township. The Red Covered Bridge was added to the National Register of Historic Places in 1980.

== Geography ==
According to the United States Census Bureau, the township has a total area of 21.0 square miles (54.4 km^{2}), of which 21.0 square miles (54.4 km^{2}) is land and 0.04 square mile (0.1 km^{2}) (0.10%) is water. The borough of Liverpool which separated from the township is located along part of the southeastern border. The unincorporated, agrarian community of Pfoutz Valley is located in the northwest of the township, and stretches into the northeastern sections of adjoining Greenwood Township.

== Demographics ==
Historical population
Census	Pop.	Note	%±
2010	1,057		—
2020	1,036		−2.0%
2023 (est.)	1,044		0.8%
U.S. Decennial Census

As of the census of 2010, there were 1057 people, 356 households, and 281 families living in the township. The population density was 46.0 inhabitants per square mile (17.8/km^{2}). There were 402 housing units at an average density of 19.1/sq mi (7.4/km^{2}). The racial makeup of the township was 98.65% White, 1.24% African American, and 0.10% from two or more races. Hispanic or Latino of any race were 0.10% of the population.

There were 356 households, out of which 34.0% had children under the age of 18 living with them, 70.5% were married couples living together, 3.7% had a female householder with no husband present, and 20.8% were non-families. 18.3% of all households were made up of individuals, and 8.1% had someone living alone who was 65 years of age or older. The average household size was 2.71 and the average family size was 3.06.

In the township the population was spread out, with 26.7% under the age of 18, 6.2% from 18 to 24, 28.7% from 25 to 44, 29.0% from 45 to 64, and 9.4% who were 65 years of age or older. The median age was 39 years. For every 100 females there were 97.1 males. For every 100 females age 18 and over, there were 99.4 males.

The median income for a household in the township was $41,389, and the median income for a family was $46,250. Males had a median income of $34,615 versus $22,407 for females. The per capita income for the township was $18,261. About 1.9% of families and 4.3% of the population were below the poverty line, including 3.3% of those under age 18 and 12.9% of those age 65 or over.
