= Monroe Township, Juniata County, Pennsylvania =

Township in Pennsylvania, US

Coordinates: 40°40′00″N 77°07′59″W

- Township
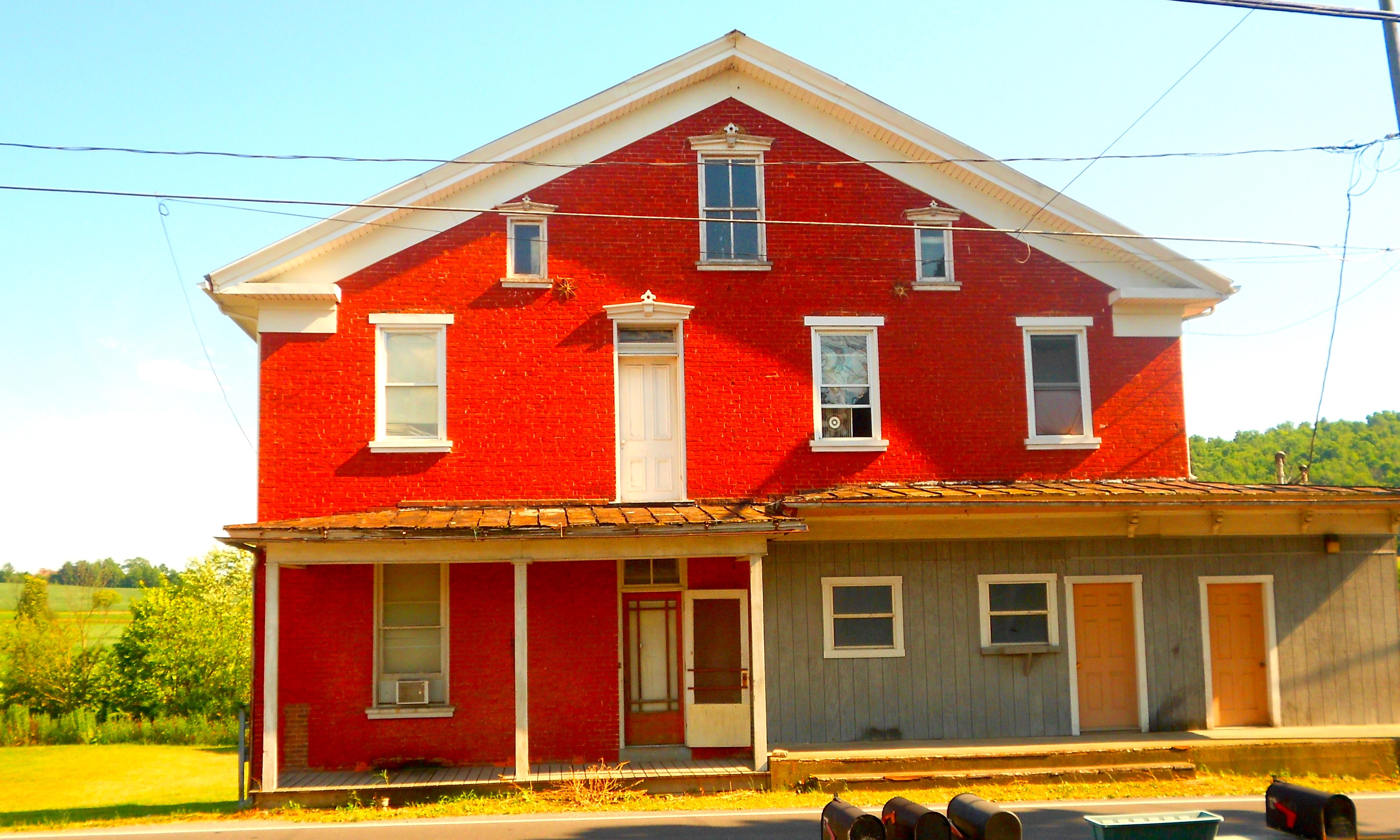
- Building in Evendale

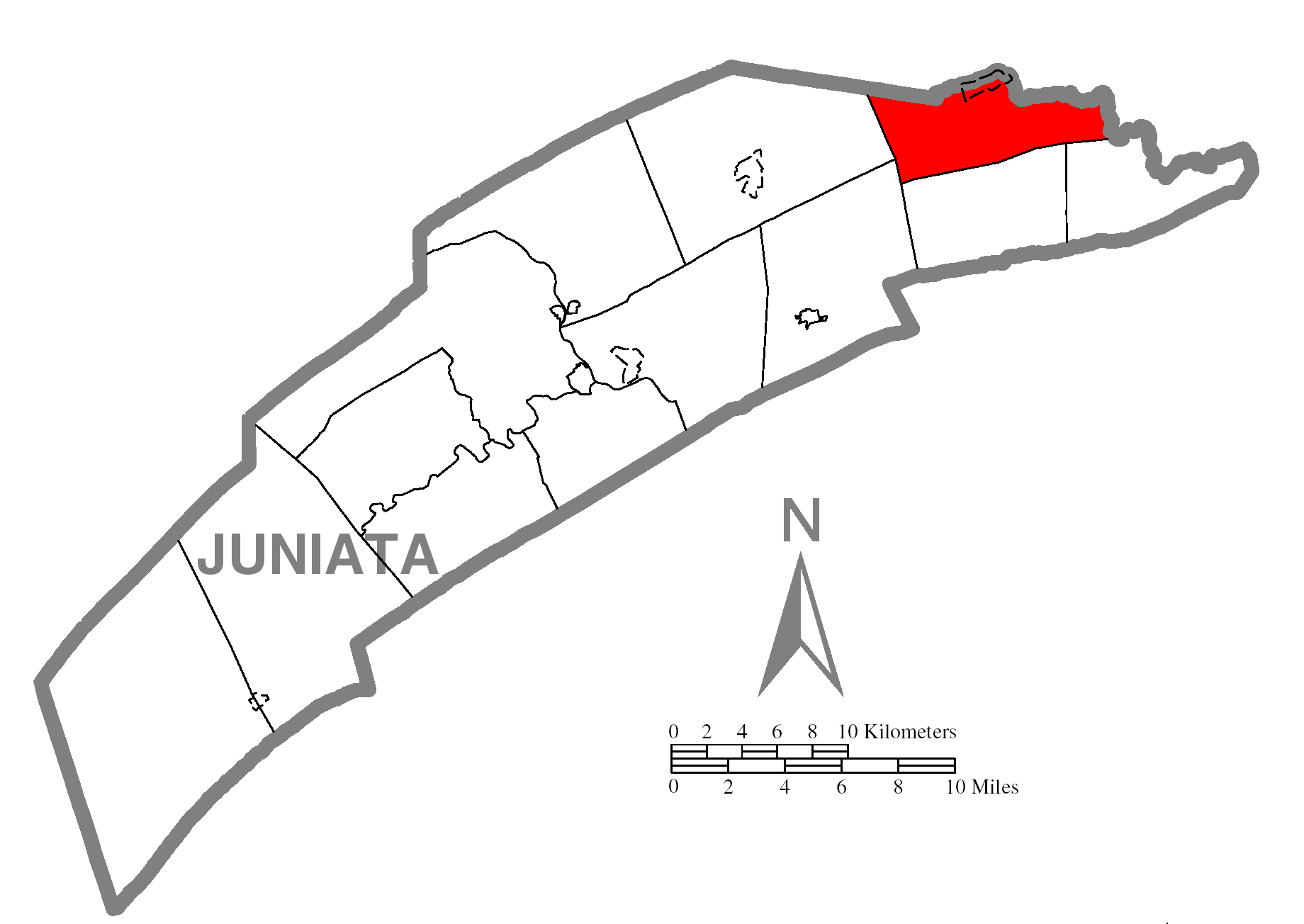
- Map of Juniata County, Pennsylvania highlighting Monroe Township

- Map of Juniata County, Pennsylvania
- Country: United States
- State: Pennsylvania
- County: Juniata
- Settled: 1772
- Incorporated: 1858

Area
  - Total: 19.89 sq mi (51.52 km^{2})
  - Land: 19.89 sq mi (51.52 km^{2})
  - Water: 0 sq mi (0.00 km^{2})

Population (2020)
  - Total: 2,050 ▼
  - Estimate (2022): 2,026
  - Density: 112.6/sq mi (43.48/km^{2})
- Time zone: UTC-5 (EST)
  - Summer (DST): UTC-4 (EDT)
- Area code: 717
- FIPS code: 42-067-50480

Monroe Township is a township that is located in Juniata County, Pennsylvania, United States. The population was 2,050 at the time of the 2020 census, a decrease from the figure of 2,237 that was tabulated in 2010.

== Geography ==
This township is located in northeastern Juniata County, with the West Branch of Mahantango Creek forming the northeastern boundary. According to the United States Census Bureau, the township has a total area of 19.9 square miles (51.5 km^{2}), all land.

Monroe Township is bordered by Snyder County to the north and east, Susquehanna and Greenwood Townships to the south, and Delaware and Fayette Townships to the west. The unincorporated community of Richfield is situated at the northern border of the township. Other communities in the township are Evendale, Kellerville, Stony Run, and Knousetown.

Pennsylvania Route 35 passes through the northern part of the township, connecting Evendale and Richfield. The highway leads west to Mifflintown on the Juniata River and east to Selinsgrove on the Susquehanna.

== Demographics ==
Historical population
Census	Pop.	Note	%±
1860	1,021		—
1870	1,078		5.6%
1880	1,125		4.4%
1890	1,092		−2.9%
1900	1,078		−1.3%
1910	1,011		−6.2%
1920	963		−4.7%
1930	1,014		5.3%
1940	1,241		22.4%
1950	1,261		1.6%
1960	1,321		4.8%
1970	1,425		7.9%
1980	1,651		15.9%
1990	1,800		9.0%
2000	2,042		13.4%
2010	2,237		9.5%
2020	2,050		−8.4%
2022 (est.)	2,026		−1.2%
U.S. Decennial Census

As of the census of 2000, there were 2,042 people, 712 households, and 571 families residing in the township.

The population density was 104.0 inhabitants per square mile (40.2/km^{2}). There were 765 housing units at an average density of 39.0 per square mile (15.1/km^{2}).

The racial makeup of the township was 99.17% White, 0.34% African American, 0.05% Native American, 0.10% from other races, and 0.34% from two or more races. Hispanic or Latino of any race were 0.34% of the population.

There were 712 households, out of which 39.3% had children under the age of eighteen living with them; 71.2% were married couples living together, 4.2% had a female householder with no husband present, and 19.7% were non-families. 16.3% of all households were made up of individuals, and 9.4% had someone living alone who was sixty-five years of age or older.

The average household size was 2.80 and the average family size was 3.13.

With the township, the population was spread out, with 28.0% of residents who were under the age of eighteen, 8.7% who were aged eighteen to twenty-four, 29.0% who were aged twenty-five to forty-four, 20.7% who were aged forty-five to sixty-four, and 13.6% who were sixty-five years of age or older. The median age was thirty-four years.

For every one hundred females, there were 104.4 males. For every one hundred females who were aged eighteen or older, there were 98.4 males.

The median income for a household in the township was $38,807, and the median income for a family was $41,731. Males had a median income of $30,064 compared with that of $22,102 for females.

The per capita income for the township was $16,477.

Approximately 6.3% of families and 7.8% of the population were living below the poverty line, including 8.0% of those who were under the age of eighteen and 11.2% of those who were aged sixty-five or older.
