= Richfield, Pennsylvania =

Census-designated place in Pennsylvania

Richfield
- Census-designated place
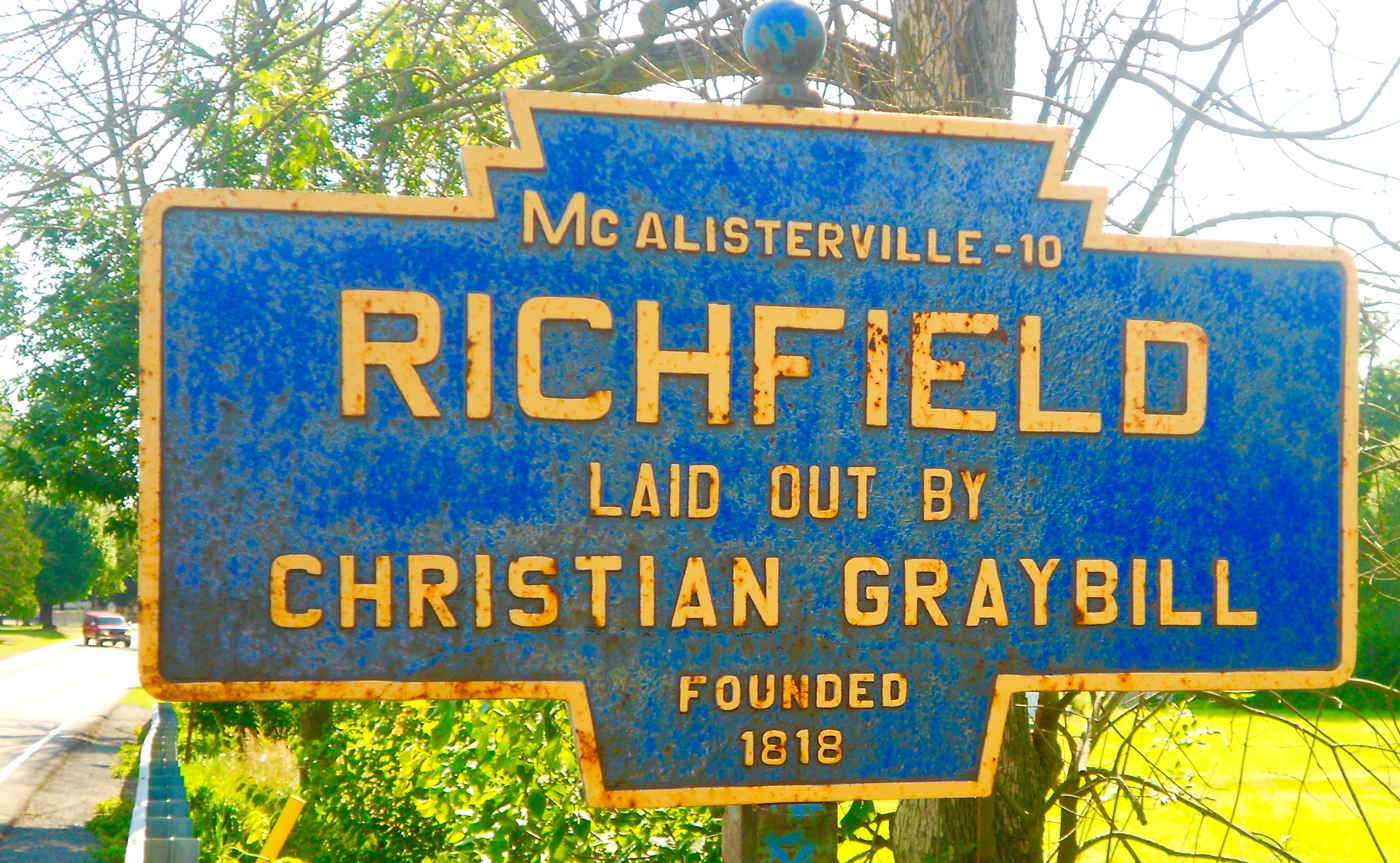

- Location within Pennsylvania Location within the United States
- Coordinates: 40°41′12″N 77°06′50″W
- Country: United States
- State: Pennsylvania
- Counties: Juniata, Snyder
- Townships: Monroe, West Perry
- Founded: 1818

Area
  - Total: 1.17 sq mi (3.02 km^{2})
  - Land: 1.16 sq mi (3.01 km^{2})
  - Water: 0.0039 sq mi (0.01 km^{2}) 0.17%
- Elevation: 656 ft (200 m)

Population (2020)
  - Total: 530
  - Density: 460/sq mi (180/km^{2})
- Time zone: UTC-5 (EST)
  - Summer (DST): UTC-4 (EDT)
- ZIP code: 17086
- Area code: 717
- FIPS code: 42-64488
- GNIS feature ID: 1185007

Richfield is an unincorporated community and census-designated place (CDP) in Juniata and Snyder counties in Pennsylvania, United States. The population was 530 at the 2020 census.

== Geography ==
Richfield is located in eastern Juniata County and southern Snyder County at 40°41′12″N 77°06′50″W (40.6868683, -77.1140736). The bulk of the community is in the northern part of Monroe Township, Juniata County, but part lies to the north in the southern part of West Perry Township, Snyder County. The township and county line follows the West Branch of Mahantango Creek, which runs from west to east, north of the center of town.

Pennsylvania Route 35 is the main road through the community, leading northeast 15 miles (24 km) to Selinsgrove and southwest 17 miles (27 km) to Mifflintown, the Juniata county seat.

According to the United States Census Bureau, the Richfield CDP has a total area of 1.164596 square miles (3.016289 km^{2}), of which 0.001998 square miles (0.005176 km^{2}) (0.17%) is water.

== Demographics ==
Historical population
Census	Pop.	Note	%±
2000	459		—
2010	549		19.6%
2020	530		−3.5%

As of the 2020 United States census there were 530 people in the CDP. The population density was 455/sq mi (175.7/km^{2}). There were 212 housing units at an average density of 182.0/sq mi (70.29/km^{2}). The racial makeup of the CDP was 94.7% White, 0.8% Black or African American, 0.4% Asian, 1.1% from some other race, and 3% from two or more races. Hispanic or Latino of any race were 2.5% of the population.

There were 190 households, out of which 30.5% had children under the age of 18 living with them, 54.7% were married couples living together, 23.7% had a female householder with no spouse or partner present, and 29.5% were non-families. 25.3% of all households were made up of individuals, and 11.6% had someone living alone who was 65 years of age or older.

19.6% of the population was age 19 and under, 7.2% from 20 to 24, 24% from 25 to 44, 20.9% from 45 to 64, and 28.3% who were 65 years of age or older. The median age was 44.5 years. For every 100 females, there were 1.1 males. For every 100 females age 18 and over, there were 1.1 males.

As of the 2024 American Community Survey, the median income for a household in the CDP was US$58,250, and the median income for a family was US$82,500. The per capita income for the CDP was US$45,735. 2.4% of families and 13.3% of the population were below the poverty line, including 5.9% of those under age 18 and 7% of those age 65 or over.

== Gallery ==
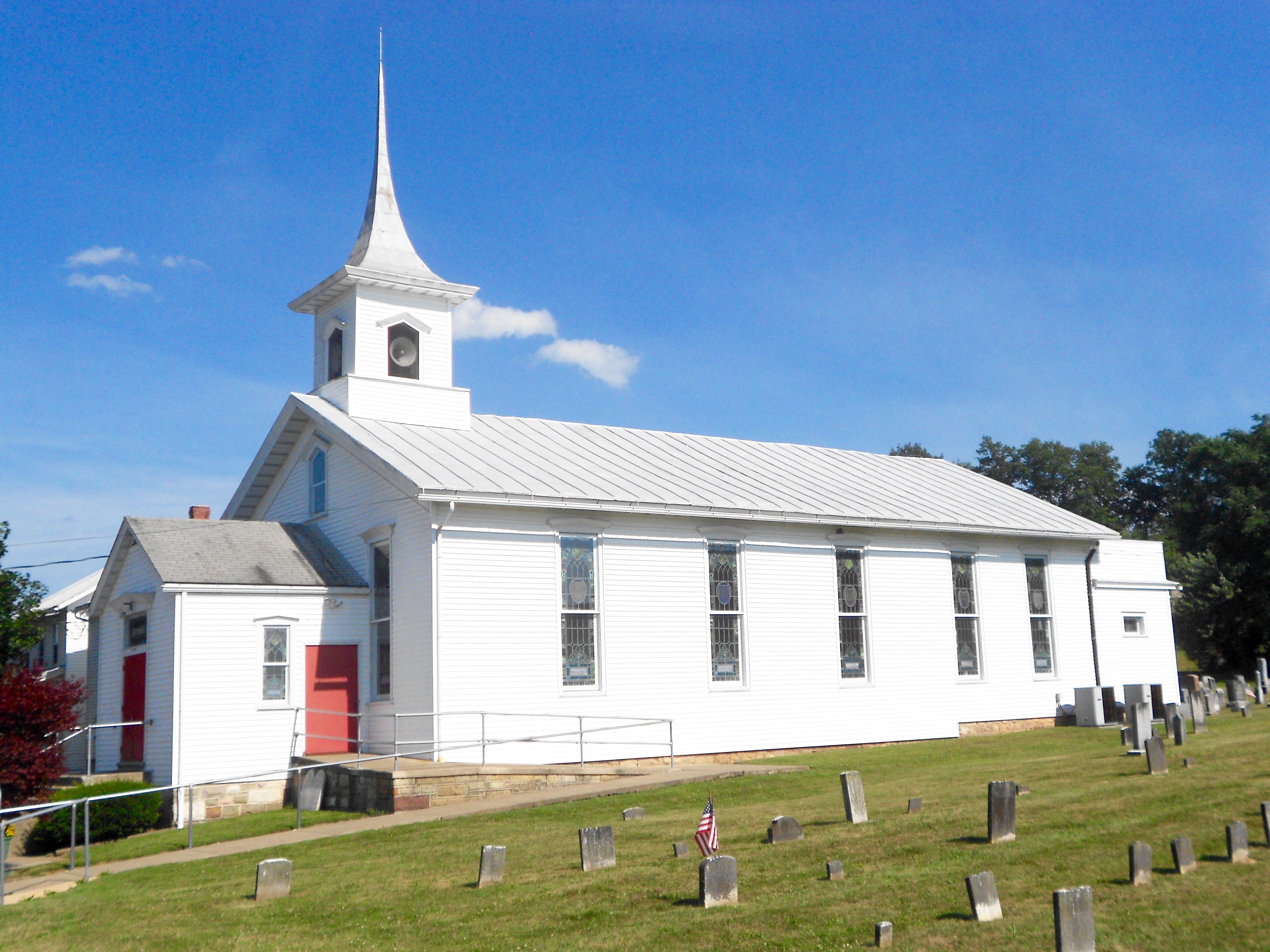
Former United Methodist Church

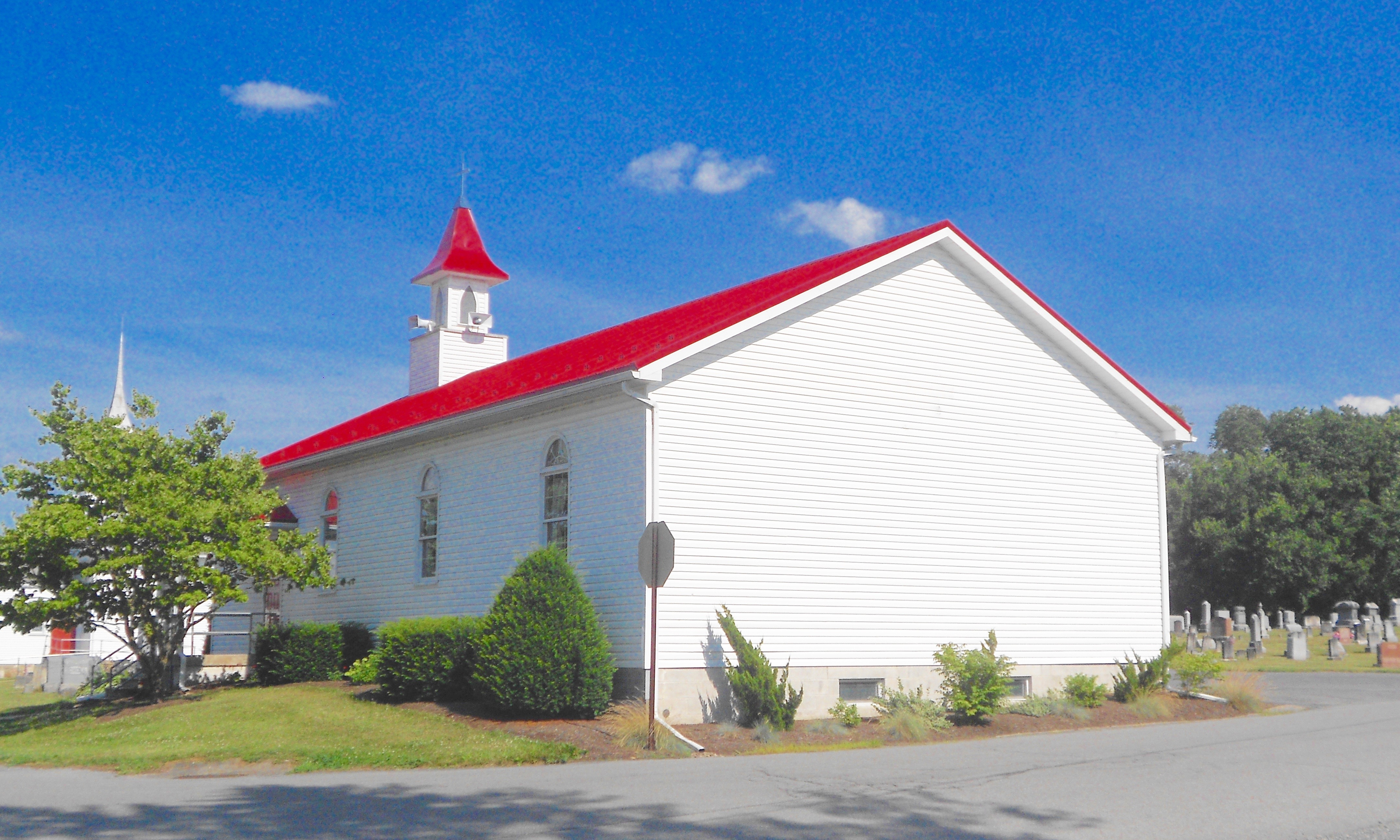
United Church of Christ

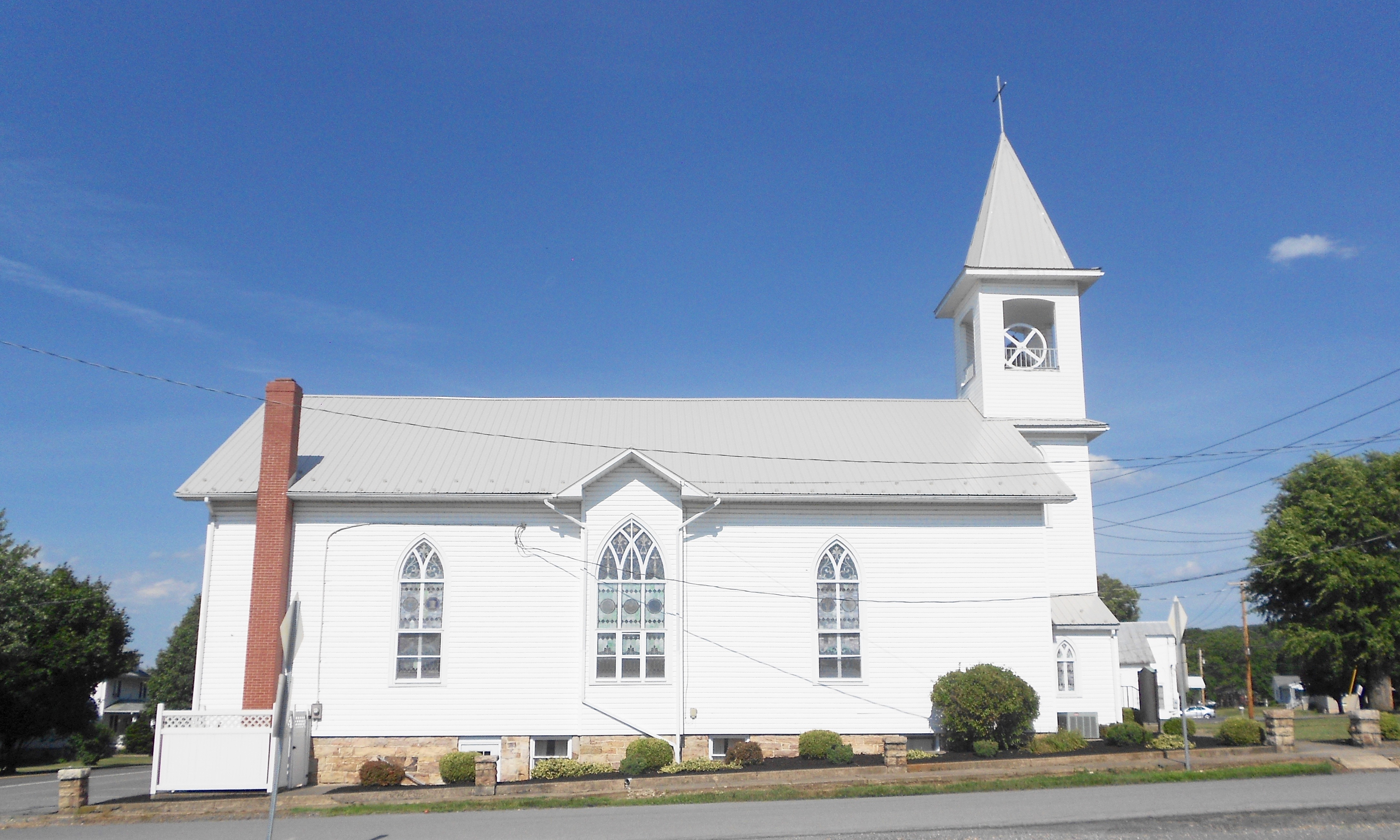
St. Johns Lutheran Church
