= West Branch Mahantango Creek =

River in Pennsylvania, United States

Coordinates: 40°38′50″N 76°57′56″W

West Branch Mahantango Creek is a tributary of Mahantango Creek in Snyder County and Juniata County, in Pennsylvania, in the United States. It is approximately 18 miles (29 km) in length. The creek starts on Shade Mountain in Snyder County. It ends at its confluence with Mahantango Creek. Most of the land in the watershed is devoted to forest or agriculture. Trout and minnows have been observed in the creek, which is stocked with trout. A covered bridge was built over it in 1908.

== Course ==
West Branch Mahantango Creek starts in the Allen Gap on Shade Mountain in Bald Eagle State Forest. The source is located in West Perry Township, Snyder County. The creek flows southeast down the mountain to the Snyder County/Juniata County line. From here, the creek turns eastward and follows the county line, as well as roughly following Pennsylvania Route 35. After about 3 miles (4.8 km), the creek turns southward, following the county line, but no longer paralleling Pennsylvania Route 35. It passes by Forrey Ridge before turning eastward again after about one mile. After several miles, the creek meanders past the Pennsylvania State Game Lands Number 194. At this point, the stream, along with North Branch Mahantango Creek, flows into Mahantango Creek. Mahantango Creek continues approximately two miles eastward before flowing into the Susquehanna River.

== Watershed and tributaries ==
West Branch Mahantango Creek is entirely located in West Perry Township, Snyder County, and Monroe Township, Juniata County. The creek and all its tributaries make up a total of 19.98 stream miles. The upper part of the watershed is considered "impaired" by the state of Pennsylvania. The impaired section of the watershed occupies 9.83 square miles.

Out of the impaired upper portion of the West Branch Mahantango Creek watershed, 66% of the land is forest, 28% is devoted to agriculture, and 6% has other uses. In the impaired area of the watershed, hay and pastureland make up 741 acres. Cropland takes up 1018 acres and the forest takes up 4154 acres. Wetland occupies 32 acres and low-intensity development occupies 336 acres. There are 5 acres of land in transition and 5 acres of high-intensity development.

Several of the tributaries of West Branch Mahantango Creek have sources on Shade Mountain.

== Hydrology ==
A total of 8,747 pounds (3,968 kg) of sediment flow through West Branch Mahantango Creek every day. This equates to a load of 3,192,600 pounds (1,448,100 kg) of sediment per year.

The average annual rainfall in the West Branch Mahantango Creek watershed between 1992 and 2011 was 39.30 inches (99.8 cm). The average annual runoff was 2.75 inches (7.0 cm). Snyder County considers it possible that small amounts of flooding can cause damage to structures located along the creek.

== Geography ==
West Branch Mahantango Creek is located at an elevation of 390 feet (120 m) above sea level.

Downstream of Richfield, West Branch Mahantango Creek is 15 feet (4.6 m) to 20 feet (6.1 m) wide.

== History ==
The 69-foot (21-meter) long Oriental Bridge was built over West Branch Mahantango Creek in 1908 and was renovated in 1987. It is open to traffic. A dam called the Meiser's Mill Dam was once built along the creek, but it was destroyed.

== Biology ==
The waters of West Branch Mahantango Creek are approved trout waters. Minnows also live in the creek. Dozens of vernal pools are located near one area of the creek in Monroe Township. These vernal pools are located at the bottom of a wooded ridge. Two of the pools are home to the plant Leucothoe racemosa. The Richfield Marsh is also located on West Branch Mahantango Creek. The plant Schoenoplectus acutus, which is endangered in Pennsylvania, was found in the Richfield Marsh in 1987. This marsh is one to two acres in size. It is also home to speckled alder and poison sumac. Smallmouth bass have been known to live in the creek. The creek has been stocked with brown trout and rainbow trout.

== See also ==
- List of rivers of Pennsylvania
