= Liverpool, Pennsylvania =

Borough in Pennsylvania, US

- Borough
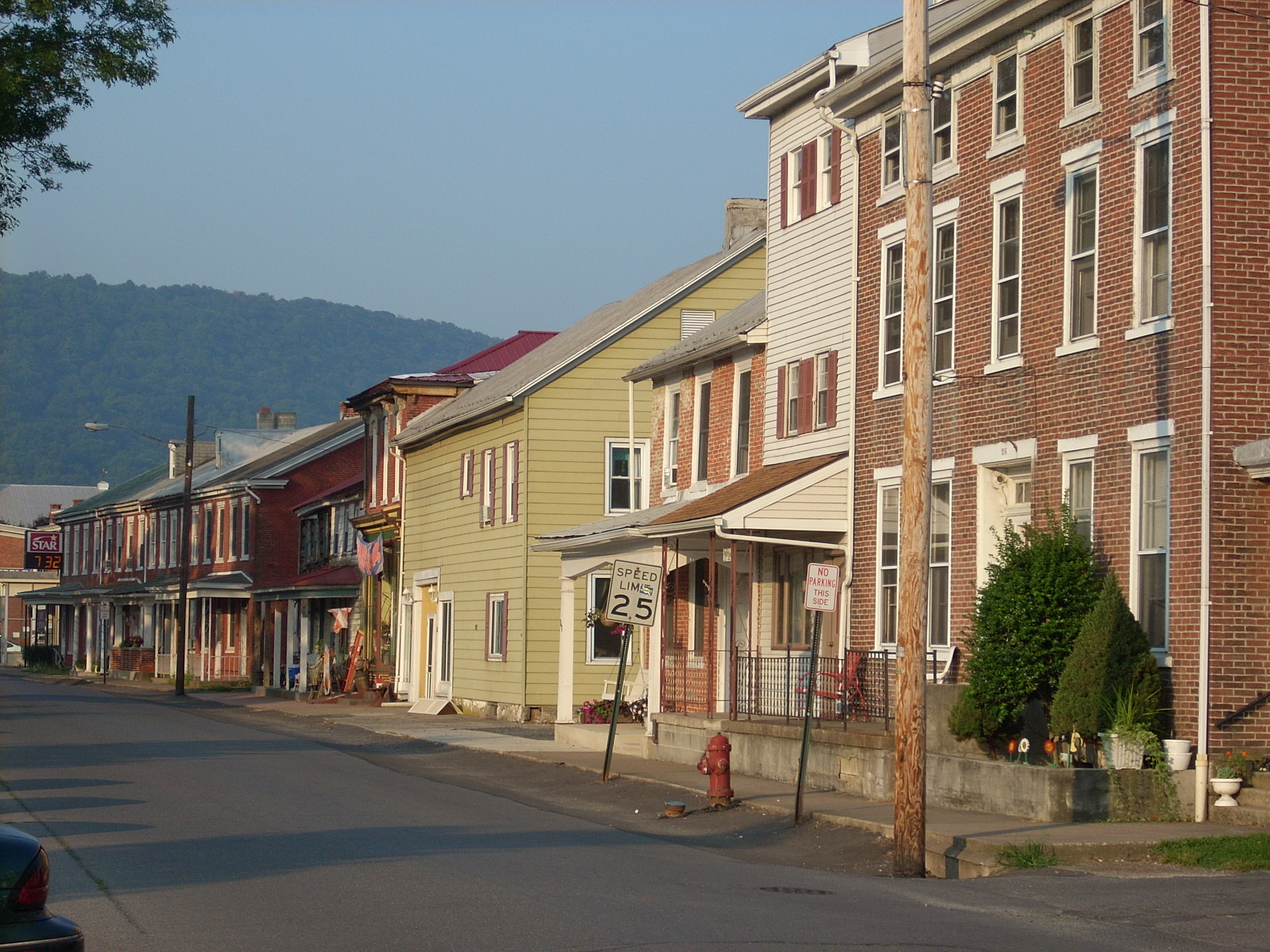
- Liverpool on a summer morning

- Location of Liverpool in Perry County, Pennsylvania.

- Location within Pennsylvania Location within the United States
- Coordinates: 40°34′25″N 76°59′28″W
- Country: United States
- State: Pennsylvania
- County: Perry
- Settled: 1808
- Incorporated: 1832

Government
  - Type: Borough Council
  - Mayor: John Mark

Area
  - Total: 0.88 sq mi (2.28 km^{2})
  - Land: 0.88 sq mi (2.28 km^{2})
  - Water: 0 sq mi (0.00 km^{2})
- Elevation (center of borough): 420 ft (130 m)
- Highest elevation (western boundary of borough): 580 ft (180 m)
- Lowest elevation (Susquehanna River): 394 ft (120 m)

Population (2020)
  - Total: 960
  - Density: 1,090.3/sq mi (420.95/km^{2})
- Time zone: UTC-5 (Eastern (EST))
  - Summer (DST): UTC-4 (EDT)
- Zip Code: 17045
- Area code: 717
- FIPS code: 42-43968
- Website: https://www.liverpoolpa.us/

Liverpool is a borough in the northeastern corner of Perry County, Pennsylvania, United States. It is part of the Harrisburg–Carlisle metropolitan statistical area.

The borough's population was 959 at the time of the 2020 census.

== Location ==
Liverpool is located along the Susquehanna River and U.S. Routes 11 and 15 at the eastern terminus of Pennsylvania Route 17.

The borough is approximately 20 miles (32 km) northwest of Harrisburg in Dauphin County and 16 miles (26 km) southwest of Selinsgrove in Snyder County.

It is not to be confused with Liverpool Township, which is adjacent to the borough.

== History ==
Liverpool was settled in 1808 by the Stailey family, who emigrated from Liverpool, England, for which it was named. Located beside the Susquehanna River in eastern Perry County, the community was surveyed by John Huggins and plotted by Peter Williamson that year. It was originally made up of the land between present-day North Alley and Strawberry Street. Subsequently incorporated on May 4, 1832, it is one of the nine boroughs incorporated in the county. The neighboring community of Northern Liberties was absorbed into Liverpool at the time of its incorporation.

As the population grew, so did its business offerings, civic services and industries. Its first businessmen were merchant Thomas Gallagher and hotelier John Huggins.

In subsequent months and years, a foundry was built, George Thorp opened a distillery, and John Speece erected a tannery operation.

The community's first schoolhouse was a twenty-five-square-foot log structure.

In July 1821, John Huggins launched the borough's first newspaper, the Mercury, which was absorbed later that decade by The Perry County Democrat.

Over the years, a bank, a post office and multiple new businesses and churches were also built.

By 1829, the Pennsylvania Canal system had completed work on its Main Line Canal, which ran north, parallel to the Susquehanna River for thirty-nine miles, from Duncan's Island in Perry County (now Duncannon) through New Buffalo, Girty's Notch, Montgomery's Ferry, Mount Patrick, Liverpool, and Selinsgrove to Northumberland. Liverpool ultimately became the Mainline Canal's hub, attracting canal boat builders and operators, more hotels to house visitors to the area and more homes for the employees of the businesses that catered to those travelers.

Shortly after the Civil War, John W. Garrett of B. & O. Railroad fame acquired three gunboats used in the blockade service and refitted them into packet boats, establishing the first regular line service from Baltimore to Liverpool, increasing the town's commercial interests.

In 1910, the population of the borough was five hundred and ninety-six. By 1912, the borough's schools employed four teachers.

== School district ==
Historical population
Census	Pop.	Note	%±
1840	451		—
1850	606		34.4%
1860	662		9.2%
1870	823		24.3%
1880	838		1.8%
1890	821		−2.0%
1900	653		−20.5%
1910	596		−8.7%
1920	586		−1.7%
1930	586		0.0%
1940	607		3.6%
1950	654		7.7%
1960	894		36.7%
1970	847		−5.3%
1980	809		−4.5%
1990	934		15.5%
2000	876		−6.2%
2010	955		9.0%
2020	959		0.4%
2021 (est.)	963		0.4%

Liverpool is part of the Greenwood School District, the campus of which is located in nearby Millerstown.

== Emergency services ==
The Liverpool Volunteer Fire Company provides Liverpool's fire and emergency medical services.

== Demographics ==
According to the 2010 census, Liverpool was home to nine hundred and fifty-five people.

The population consisted of 47.2% males and 52.8% females. 96.1% of residents were White, 1% were Asian, 0.6% were Hispanic, 0.5% were Black, 0.2% were Native Americans/Pacific Islanders, and 0.2% were of other races or two or more races.

In 2010, the median household income was $35,517.
