= Mahantango Creek (Snyder and Juniata Counties, Pennsylvania) =

Watercourse in the United States

Coordinates: 40°38′19″N 76°56′21″W

Mahantango Creek (also known as Mahantongo Creek) is a 2.1-mile-long (3.4 km) tributary of the Susquehanna River in Snyder and Juniata counties, Pennsylvania, in the United States. Its name comes from a Delaware Indian word meaning "where we had plenty to eat". The creek flows along the border between Snyder County and Juniata County.

Historically, numerous sawmills and gristmills have been built on the creek. The first inhabitants of the area arrived in the late 1700s. In the 1750s, Peter and Michael Shaffer had land grants along and near the mouth of Mahantango Creek. They were both farmers, Michael also had a lumber mill and a distillery.

The watershed of the creek has an area of 86.2 square miles (223 km^{2}). Trout inhabit the tributaries of Mahantango Creek, but not the main stem. Smallmouth bass, however, may inhabit Mahantango Creek itself.

== Course ==
Mahantango Creek begins at the border between Perry Township, Snyder County, Chapman Township, Snyder County, and Susquehanna Township, Juniata County. The creek's headwaters are at the confluence of North Branch Mahantango Creek and West Branch Mahantango Creek, near Pennsylvania Route 104 near the village of Meiserville. It heads southeast for a short distance and then turns northeast. Shortly afterwards, it turns southeast again, passing by the community of Mahantango. The creek then turns nearly due-south and crosses under U.S. Route 11 and U.S. Route 15. Shortly afterwards, it reaches its confluence with the Susquehanna River.

Mahantango Creek joins the Susquehanna River 105.98 miles (170.56 km) upstream of its mouth and 27 miles (43 km) upstream of Harrisburg.

=== Tributaries ===
Mahantango Creek has two named tributaries. These are North Branch Mahantango Creek and West Branch Mahantango Creek. West Branch Mahantango Creek is 18 miles (29 km) long and North Branch Mahantango Creek is 13.1 miles (21.1 km) long. Both of these tributaries' headwaters are in Bald Eagle State Park.

== Hydrology, geography and geology ==
There is a broken flint ridge between Richfield and Mahantango Creek. A feature known as McKee's Half Falls is located near the creek's mouth. There are also limestone and sandstone formations at the mouth of the creek. A rock formation known as the Marcellus black slate forms visible outcrops at the headwaters of the creek.

Mahantango Creek forms part of the border between Snyder County and Juniata County.

In 2009, a $600,000 project was to alleviate soil erosion on Mahantango Creek was carried out. There are also no-till planting practices being done in the creek's watershed to reduce the amount of sediment flowing from it into the Susquehanna River and Chesapeake Bay.

The water temperature of Mahantango Creek can be as high as 85 °F (29 °C).

== Watershed ==
The watershed of Mahantango Creek has an area of 86.2 square miles (223 km^{2}). The watershed is located in Snyder County and Juniata County.

Parts of the watershed of Mahantango Creek are rural and is mostly used for agricultural purposes.

== History ==
Mahantango Creek's name comes from the Delaware word mahantongo, which means "where we had plenty to eat". It was apparently named after a group of Native Americans had a large meal on the creek.

George Herrold had a 146.2-acre (59.2 ha) tract of land on the creek in 1765. It is unlikely, but possible, that Peter Shaffer settled on the creek around 1765. Michael Witmer gained access to a tract of land on Mahantango Creek around 1770.

In May 1772, there were plans to construct a road from Sunbury to Mahantango Creek. The Mahantongo Methodist Circuit historically included the watershed of the creek.

Historically, there were twelve gristmills and fourteen sawmills on Mahantango Creek and its tributaries. As late as 1919, there were still a large number of mills in the watershed, including the Old West Perry Mill, producing fermented pear cider, or perry, which was built in 1778.

In March 1901, flooding and ice jams severely damaged a number of bridges over Mahantango Creek. There are two covered bridges located on Mahantango Creek near Pennsylvania Route 104. One of them is called the North Oriental Covered Bridge and was built in 1908. The other is known as the Sheaffer Covered Bridge and was built in 1907. Both bridges are burr arch truss bridges.

== Biology ==
The Mahantango Creek Confluence Pools are a series of small pools located near Mahantango Creek in Susquehanna Township, Juniata County and Snyder County. These pools are surrounded by hardwood forests, which have been somewhat affected by logging. Additionally, there are vernal pools on the tributary West Branch Mahantango Creek. These are known as the West Branch Mahantango Creek Vernal Pools.

Mahantango Creek flows through an area of forest with an area of greater than 5,000 acres (2,000 ha).

Mahantango Creek is not stocked with fish. It is, however, a warmwater community for fish. No trout inhabit the creek, although it is possible that smallmouth bass inhabit it. However, trout are stocked on the tributary West Branch Mahantango Creek. Brook trout have inhabited North Branch Mahantango Creek in the past.

A barn on the floodplain of Mahantango Creek is inhabited by 30,000 bats. These include little brown myotis bats and big brown bats.

== See also ==
- Boyers Run, next tributary of the Susquehanna River going downriver
- Hoffer Creek, next tributary of the Susquehanna River going upriver
- List of rivers of Pennsylvania
