= Millerstown, Pennsylvania =

Borough in Pennsylvania, US

- Borough
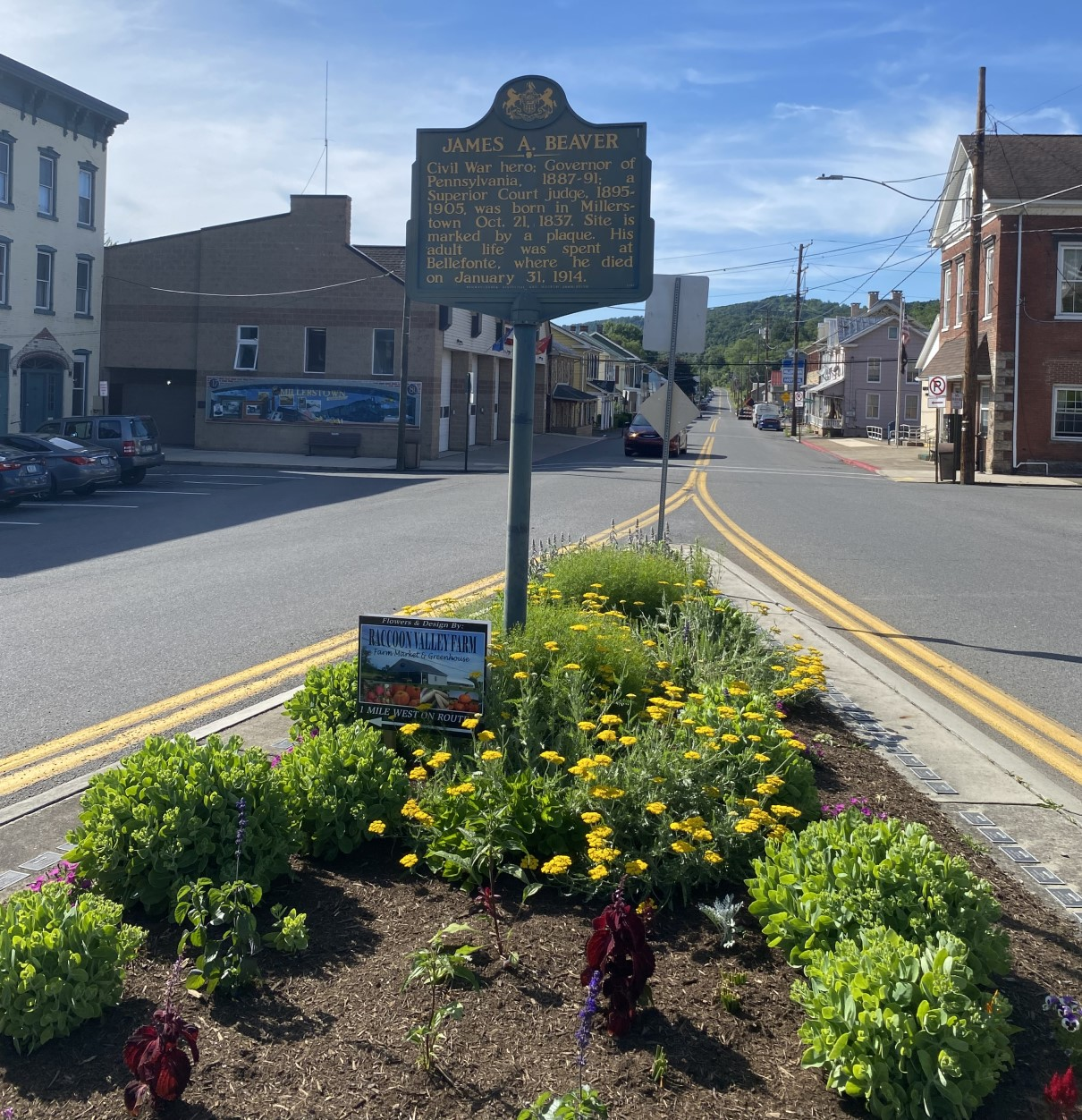
- The southern-facing half of Millerstown's town square
- Motto: Perry County's Oldest Planned Town
- Location of Millerstown in Perry County, Pennsylvania.

- Location within Pennsylvania Location within the United States
- Coordinates: 40°33′03″N 77°09′17″W
- Country: United States
- State: Pennsylvania
- County: Perry
- Settled: 1780
- Incorporated: 1849

Government
  - Mayor: John Kerns
  - Secretary/Treasurer: Karen Knellinger
  - Solicitor: Dissinger & Dissinger
  - Tax Collector: Kimberly Savercool

Area
  - Total: 0.92 sq mi (2.38 km^{2})
  - Land: 0.85 sq mi (2.19 km^{2})
  - Water: 0.073 sq mi (0.19 km^{2})
- Elevation (Borough center at intersection of US 22 and PA 17): 425 ft (130 m)
- Highest elevation (south side of Slaughterback Hill): 740 ft (230 m)
- Lowest elevation (Juniata River): 392 ft (119 m)

Population (2020)
  - Total: 691
  - Density: 817.5/sq mi (315.63/km^{2})
- Time zone: UTC-5 (Eastern (EST))
  - Summer (DST): UTC-4 (EDT)
- Zip code: 17062
- Area codes: 717, 223
- FIPS code: 42-49720
- Website: Millerstown, Pennsylvania

Millerstown is a borough in northern Perry County, Pennsylvania, United States, located (via road) 29 miles (47 km) northwest of Harrisburg and 29 miles (47 km) southwest of Selinsgrove. The population was 688 at the 2020 Census. The borough is part of the Harrisburg–Carlisle Metropolitan Statistical Area.

== History ==
Millerstown is located on a tract of land originally sold as "Smithfield" to James Gallagher on September 23, 1766; there is evidence, however, that he had lived in the area prior to his purchase.

This plot of ground was later deeded to David Miller on September 1, 1780, who established a settlement and a ferry operation. Miller filed for a patent in 1790 with Thomas Mifflin for the "laying out of the town," thus making Miller's Town the first town to be plotted for sale in the territory at that time comprising Perry County. Miller's Town was later combined to form Millerstown.

In 1800, the first tavern was constructed on Market Street, later known as the Alexander House, which would in more recent years become a VFW Post until its closure in 2017.

Millerstown Borough was incorporated February 12, 1849, and the first meeting of the newly formed town council was held on April 14, 1849. Abraham Addams was the first chief burgess (mayor), and John M. Cauffman, Christian Beck, James R. Gilmer, and Jacob Emerick, were members of the first borough council. Thomas P. Cochran was the first council clerk with a salary of $2.50 a year.

Millerstown is home to many old stone houses, some dating back to the 18th century.

== Geography ==
Millerstown is located at 40°33′3″N 77°9′17″W (40.550884, -77.154659), along the Juniata River in northern Perry County, at the junctions of U.S. Routes 22 and 322 and Pennsylvania Route 17. It is 33 miles northwest of the state capital, Harrisburg.

According to the United States Census Bureau, the borough has a total area of 0.9 square miles (2.3 km^{2}), of which 0.9 square miles (2.3 km^{2}) is land and 0.1 square miles (0.26 km^{2}) (6.52%) is water.

== Demographics ==
Historical population
Census	Pop.	Note	%±
1840	371		—
1850	389		4.9%
1860	378		−2.8%
1870	533		41.0%
1880	652		22.3%
1890	594		−8.9%
1900	555		−6.6%
1910	549		−1.1%
1920	616		12.2%
1930	689		11.9%
1940	684		−0.7%
1950	682		−0.3%
1960	675		−1.0%
1970	612		−9.3%
1980	550		−10.1%
1990	646		17.5%
2000	679		5.1%
2010	673		−0.9%
2020	691		2.7%
2021 (est.)	691	Steady	0.0%

As of the census of 2000, there were 679 people, 275 households, and 196 families living in the borough. The population density was 788.7 inhabitants per square mile (304.5/km^{2}). There were 292 housing units at an average density of 339.2 per square mile (131.0/km^{2}). The racial makeup of the borough was 99.12% White, 0.29% African American, 0.15% Asian, and 0.44% from two or more races. Hispanic or Latino of any race were 0.88% of the population.

There were 275 households, out of which 32.0% had children under the age of 18 living with them, 60.4% were married couples living together, 9.1% had a female householder with no husband present, and 28.4% were non-families. 24.4% of all households were made up of individuals, and 14.9% had someone living alone who was 65 years of age or older. The average household size was 2.47 and the average family size was 2.95.

In the borough the population was spread out, with 24.0% under the age of 18, 9.0% from 18 to 24, 26.5% from 25 to 44, 23.6% from 45 to 64, and 16.9% who were 65 years of age or older. The median age was 39 years. For every 100 females there were 79.6 males. For every 100 females age 18 and over, there were 81.1 males.

The median income for a household in the borough was $43,750, and the median income for a family was $53,173. Males had a median income of $37,159 versus $24,732 for females. The per capita income for the borough was $22,289. About 2.0% of families and 5.0% of the population were below the poverty line, including 6.1% of those under age 18 and 2.5% of those age 65 or over.

== Public services ==
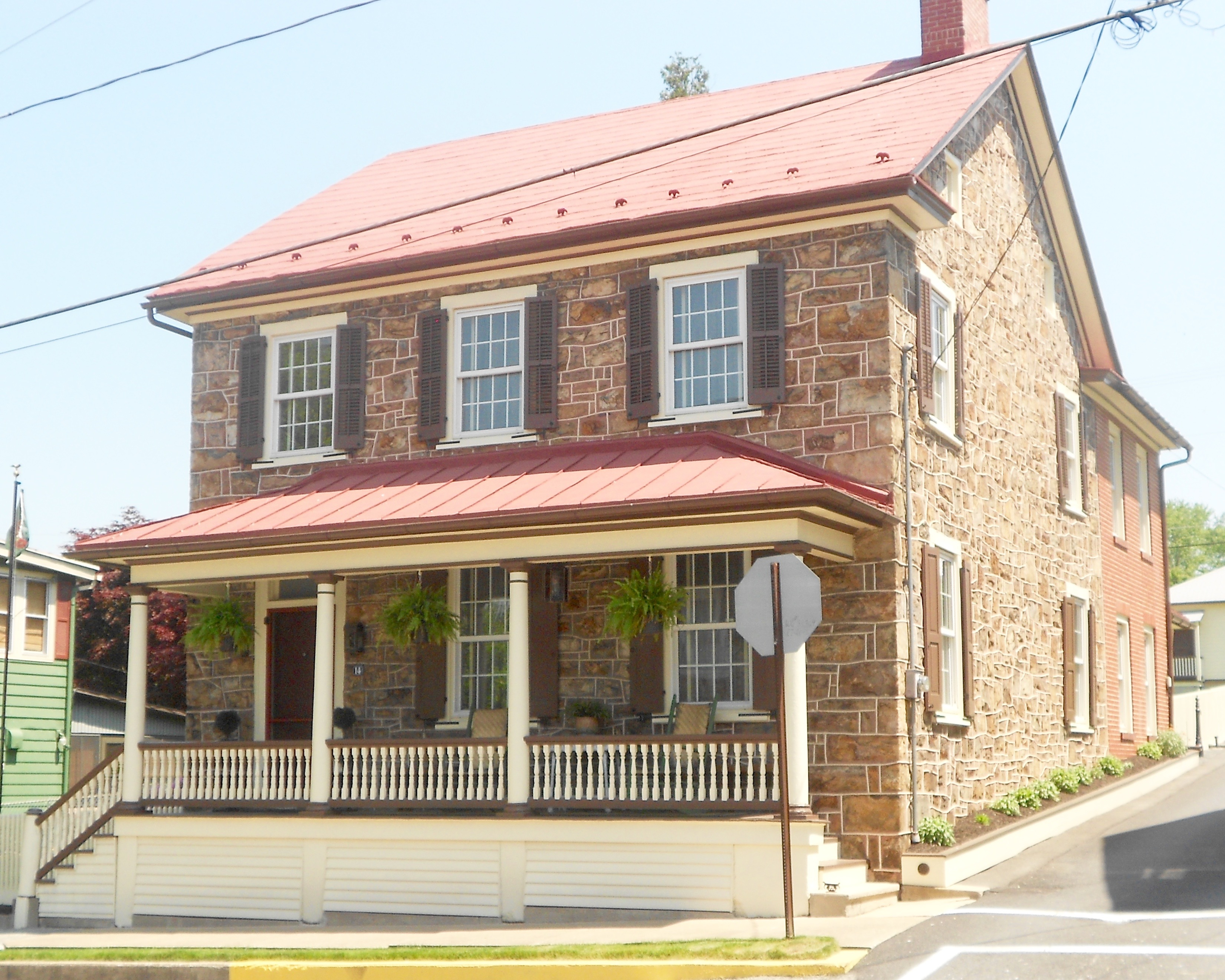
A stone house in Millerstown

The borough and most surrounding townships are served by the Greenwood School District.

Millerstown is served by the Millerstown Fire Department & Ambulance League.

== Notable people ==
- James A. Beaver, 20th Governor of Pennsylvania, born in Millerstown
- Cameron Mitchell, famous actor in the mid to late 1900s
