= Juniata County School District =

School district in Pennsylvania, U.S.

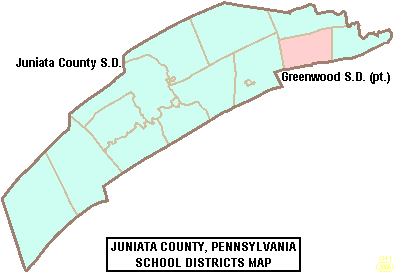

Address
- 75 South Seventh Street Mifflinton, Juniata County, Pennsylvania, 17059; United States

District information
- Type: Public

Other information
- Website: www.jcsdk12.org

The Juniata County School District is a rural, public school district located in Juniata County, Pennsylvania. The district is one of the 500 public school districts of Pennsylvania and one of seven county-wide school districts in the Commonwealth. The district encompasses approximately 372 square miles (960 km^{2}). Juniata County School District serves residents in: Beale Township, Delaware Township, Fayette Township, Fermanagh Township, Lack Township, Milford Township, Monroe Township, Spruce Hill Township, Susquehanna Township, Turbett Township, Tuscarora Township and Walker Township. It also serves the residents of the following boroughs: Mifflin, Mifflintown, Port Royal, Thompsontown, East Salem, East Waterford, Mexico, McAlisterville and Richfield.

According to 2000 federal census data, Juniata County School District served a resident population of 22,273 people. By 2013, the US Census reports that the Juniata County School District's resident population grew to 24,005 people. The educational attainment levels for the Juniata County School District population (25 years old and over) were 82.4% high school graduates and 11.2% college graduates. The district is one of the 500 public school districts of Pennsylvania.

According to the Pennsylvania Budget and Policy Center, 40.6% of the district's pupils lived at 185% or below the Federal Poverty Level as shown by their eligibility for the federal free or reduced price school meal programs in 2012. In 2009, the district residents’ per capita income was $16,112, while the median family income was $39,736. In the Commonwealth, the median family income was $49,501 and the United States median family income was $49,445, in 2010. By 2013, the median household income in the United States rose to $52,100. The educational attainment levels for the population 25 and over were 82.4% high school graduates and 11.2% college graduates.

Juniata County School District operates two high schools: Juniata High School and East Juniata Junior/Senior High School. Juniata County high school students may choose to attend Mifflin-Juniata Career and Technology Center for training in the construction and mechanical trades. The district also operates one middle school – Tuscarora Junior High School – and two elementary schools Juniata Elementary and East Juniata Elementary. The Tuscarora Intermediate Unit IU11 provides the district with a wide variety of services like specialized education for disabled students and hearing, speech and visual disability services, employee background checks and professional development for staff and faculty.

== Extracurriculars ==
The Juniata County School District offers a wide variety of clubs, activities and sports.

== Athletics ==
The district funds:

Varsity

Boys

- Baseball - AA
- Basketball- AA
- Football - AA
- Soccer - AA
- Tennis - AA
- Track and field - AA
- Wrestling - AA

Girls

- Basketball - AAA
- Soccer - AA
- Softball - AA
- Track and field - AA
