= Tuscarora Township =

Tuscarora Township may refer to:

== Canada ==
- Tuscarora Township, Ontario

== United States ==
- Tuscarora Township, Cheboygan County, Michigan
- Tuscarora Township, Pierce County, North Dakota, in Pierce County, North Dakota
- Tuscarora Township, Perry County, Pennsylvania
- Tuscarora Township, Juniata County, Pennsylvania
- Tuscarora Township, Bradford County, Pennsylvania

== See also ==
- Tuscarora (disambiguation)
