= Pennsylvania Interscholastic Athletic Association =

Governing body for middle and high school athletics

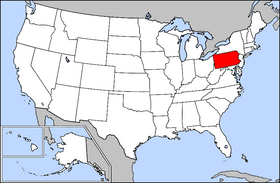
- Abbreviation: PIAA
- Formation: December 29, 1913; 112 years ago
- Type: Nonprofit Association
- Legal status: 501(c)(3)
- Purpose: To promote and support the education values of interscholastic athletics and the high ideals of good sportsmanship.
- Location: 550 Gettysburg Road, Mechanicsburg, Pennsylvania, U.S.
- Region served: Pennsylvania
- Services: Establishes and enforces uniform standards in athletic competition among member schools and promotes and supports safe and healthy athletic competition.
- Members: 1,452 schools
- Executive Director: Robert Lombardi
- Affiliations: National Federation of State High School Associations
- Revenue: $12,706,657 (2018)
- Expenses: $13,363,160 (2018)
- Employees: 25 (2017)
- Volunteers: 200 (2017)
- Website: www.piaa.org

The Pennsylvania Interscholastic Athletic Association, Inc. (PIAA) is the primary governing body of high school and middle school athletics in the U.S. state of Pennsylvania. PIAA's main office is located in the Harrisburg suburb of Mechanicsburg.

== History ==
=== 20th century ===
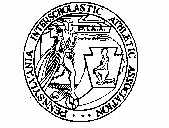
PIAA's older logo

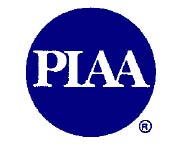
PIAA's current logo

The PIAA was founded in Pittsburgh on December 29, 1913. It is charged with serving its member schools and registered officials by establishing policies and adopting contest rules that emphasize the educational values of interscholastic athletics, promote safe and sportsmanlike competition, and provide uniform standards for all interscholastic levels of competition. As a result of the cooperative efforts of its membership, PIAA has assisted intermediate school, middle school, junior high school, and senior high school students in participating in interscholastic athletic programs on a fair and equitable basis, thus producing important education benefits.

Initially, and until 1972, PIAA membership was limited to public schools within the Commonwealth. It was and remains a voluntary organization Until 2004, for instance, public schools in Philadelphia did not participate in the PIAA.

Pennsylvania Catholic or other private schools were not eligible for PIAA membership. As a result, most Catholic schools belonged to another voluntary athletic organization, the Pennsylvania Catholic Interscholastic Athletic Association (PCIAA). This organization was founded in 1943 and mirrored the PIAA.

However, in 1972, the Pennsylvania State Legislature altered the role of the PIAA and passed Act 219 which stated, "Private schools shall be permitted, if otherwise qualified, to be members of the Pennsylvania Interscholastic Athletic Association." The General Assembly's action in 1972 thus established the legislature's right to intervene in the PIAA's affairs, a precursor to other later interventions.

Although some predicted the legislation would lead to a merger of the PCIAA and PIAA, so many Catholic schools opted into the PIAA on their own that, two years later, after an abbreviated state basketball championship tournament in 1974, the PCIAA dissolved.

=== 21st century ===
In 2000, the legislature again intervened and created the Pennsylvania Athletic Oversight Committee (PAOC). The PAOC is a 17-member oversight committee consisting of administrators, coaches and legislators to review what some had seen as the PIAA's unrestricted authority. The new law also called for several reforms including switching to a competitive process for selecting sites for championship games, eliminating the restitution rule, which required school districts that lose court cases against the PIAA to pay the associations legal fees and that persons involved in interscholastic athletics be provided equality of opportunity and treatment without discrimination.

=== Timeline ===
- 1913: PIAA established
- 1920: Pennsylvania basketball playoffs instituted (Class A Only)
- 1943: PCIAA established
- 1945: Basketball playoffs expand to Class A & B
- 1948: Basketball playoffs expand to Class A, B & C
- 1972: Act 219 signed into law, allows private schools to join PIAA
- 1973: Pennsylvania girls' basketball playoffs instituted (Class A only)
- 1974: PCIAA dissolved
- 1976: Girls' basketball playoffs expand to Class AA and AAA; Boys' basketball playoffs designated A, AA and AAA
- 1984: Basketball expands to 4 classes
- 1988: Football playoffs instituted (four classes)
- 1997: Pennsylvania passes charter school law
- 2000: Act 91 becomes law; PAOC established, PIAA cannot discriminate
- 2003: Philadelphia public league joins PIAA
- 2007: PIAA investigates separation of public and private classes
- 2008: Philadelphia Catholic League joins PIAA
- 2012: PIAA votes down separation for “Boundary” and “Non-boundary” schools
- 2015: PIAA approves expansion to six classes for football and basketball
- 2018: PIAA prohibits students who transfer during the 10th grade and after from participating in the postseason for one year unless given a waiver, effective for the 2018 school year; competitive balance rule also passed, effective in 2020, teams could be bumped up in classification depending on success or use of transfer athletes. A very controversial rule, as those moving from public school to public school are forced to abide by this rule.

== Districts ==
The PIAA divides its member schools' counties into 12 geographical districts for the purpose of state championship competition. The following list is the district breakdown by county.

- District 1: Bucks, Chester, Delaware, and Montgomery
- District 2: Lackawanna, Luzerne, Pike, Susquehanna, Wayne, and Wyoming
- District 3: Adams, Berks, Cumberland, Dauphin, Franklin, Juniata, Lancaster, Lebanon, Perry, and York
- District 4: Bradford, Columbia, Lycoming, Montour, Northumberland, Snyder, Sullivan, Tioga and Union
- District 5: Bedford, Fulton, and Somerset
- District 6: Blair, Cambria, Centre, Clearfield, Clinton, Huntingdon, Indiana, and Mifflin
- District 7, better known as the WPIAL: Allegheny (except for City of Pittsburgh), Armstrong, Beaver, Butler, Fayette, Greene, Lawrence, Washington, and Westmoreland.
- District 8: Pittsburgh Public Schools
- District 9: Cameron, Clarion, Elk, Jefferson, McKean, and Potter
- District 10: Crawford, Erie, Forest, Mercer, Venango, and Warren
- District 11: Carbon, Lehigh, Monroe, Northampton, and Schuylkill
- District 12: Philadelphia Catholic League and the Public League

While this is a general outline of the districts, there are some notable exceptions:

- Private schools within District 8 (City of Pittsburgh) compete in the WPIAL.
- Inter-Academic League and the Friends Schools League are not members of the PIAA, but compete independently as their own organizations. Other private schools in Philadelphia County compete in District 1.
- Philadelphia Catholic League schools previously competed independently as its own organization, but joined the PIAA for the 2007–2008 school year and began participating in playoffs by 2008–2009 within District 12.
- Boyertown Area Senior High School, in Berks County, is a member of District 1.
- Slippery Rock Area High School, in Butler County, is a member of District 10.
- Moniteau School District, also in Butler County, is a member of district 9.
- Galeton Area School District, in Potter County, competes in District 4.
- Indiana High School, in Indiana County, is a WPIAL member.
- Hollidaysburg Area High School is also a member of District 6 but competes as an independent in football only.
- Palisades High School, in Bucks County, is a member of District 11.
- East Stroudsburg High School North, in Pike County, is a member of District 11.
- Fannett-Metal High School, in Franklin County, is a member of District 5.
- Octorara High School, in Chester County, is a member of District 3.
- Williams Valley School District, in Dauphin County, is a member of District 11.
- Berwick Area Senior High School, in Columbia County, is a member of District 2.
- Northwest Area School District, in Luzurne County, is a member of District 4.
- Curwensville Area High School, DuBois Area Senior High School, DuBois Central Catholic, and Clearfield Area High School, in Clearfield County, are members of District 9.
- Keystone Central School District is the only district entirely composed of Clinton County municipalities. The larger of the district's two high schools, Central Mountain, is a member of District 6, while the other, Bucktail High School, is a member of District 4.
- Until its closure in 2025, Sheffield Area High School was the only school in the Warren County School District that was a member of District 9, rejoining in 2005 after several decades in District 10. The other WCSD schools (Warren, Eisenhower, and Youngsville before it, too, closed in 2025) remained in District 10.
- West Shamokin High School originally participated in the WPIAL, but moved to District 6 in 2016.
- Karns City High School, in Butler and Armstrong counties, is a member of District 9.
- Juniata County School District operates two high schools (East Juniata Junior/Senior High School and Juniata High School), which are in separate sporting districts. East Juniata is a member of District 4, while Juniata is a member of District 6.

=== East vs. West ===
Traditionally for state championship competition for team sports, Pennsylvania is divided into Eastern and Western regions. Districts 1, 2, 3, 4, 11, and 12 usually make up the Eastern Region; Districts 5, 6, 7, 8, 9, 10 usually constitute the Western Region. The winners of each region compete against each other for the state championship. However, since the creation of District 12 with the admission of the Philadelphia Public Schools into the PIAA, the East vs. West format has been abandoned for some sports in certain classifications, particularly at the Class AAAA level where there are more large schools in the East. For example, in PIAA football, District 3 schools compete in the early rounds of the state playoffs against Philadelphia schools in some classes, and against Pittsburgh schools in others.

== Sports ==
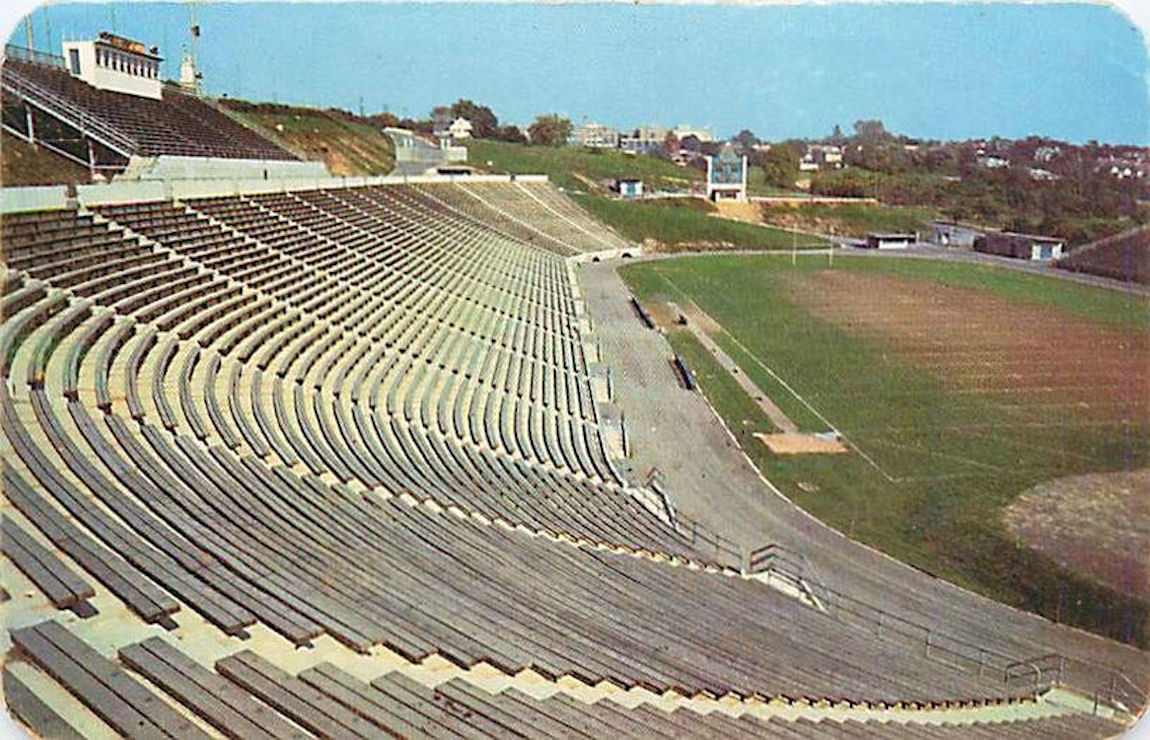
J. Birney Crum Stadium in Allentown, the largest high school stadium in the Mid-Atlantic United States and the home football field for three Allentown-based PIAA high school football teams, Allen High School, Allentown Central Catholic High School, and Dieruff High School

The PIAA sponsors 16 boys' sports and 16 girls' sports. However, the PIAA only sponsors state championships for 12 boys' sports and 12 girls' sports. The following is a list of PIAA sponsored sports championships.

- Boys' sports: baseball, basketball, cross country, football, golf, lacrosse, soccer, swimming and diving, tennis, track and field, volleyball and wrestling
- Girls' sports: basketball, competitive spirit, cross country, field hockey, golf, lacrosse, soccer, softball, swimming and diving, tennis, track and field, volleyball, and wrestling

There are Pennsylvania schools that offer sports not fully sponsored by the PIAA, including gymnastics, ice hockey, bowling, rifle, water polo, and other Olympic sports. These sports are governed by other sport specific bodies that use similar PIAA rules for classification and eligibility, but are not officially recognized as state champions by the PIAA. The PIAA took over jurisdiction of both boys' and girls' lacrosse in July 2008. indoor track and field is not sponsored by the PIAA, but allowed under PIAA rules. The PTFCA governs indoor track and field instead of the PIAA in Pennsylvania.

== Classifications ==
Every two years, the PIAA divides the member schools into two to six different classifications for each sport, depending on the number of male or female students enrolled in each school.

The number of statewide member schools participating in a particular sport will determine how many different classifications there will be. For example, boys' volleyball, the sport with the smallest number of participating schools, only has a AA or AAA classification. By comparison, boys' basketball, which has the largest number of participating schools, has A, AA, AAA, AAAA, AAAAA, AAAAAA classifications.

The number of A's signify how large or small the school is; Class A is the smallest classification while AAAAAA is the largest. The PIAA tries to place an equal number of schools in each classification.

=== Football enrollment requirements ===
| Total Male Enrollment (Grades 9–11) | Average Total Enrollment (Grades 9–12) | Classification | Number of Senior High Schools |
|---|---|---|---|
| 1–140 | 1–375 | A | 90 |
| 141–200 | 376–535 | AA | 96 |
| 201–282 | 536–752 | AAA | 96 |
| 283–397 | 753–1,060 | AAAA | 89 |
| 398–563 | 1,061–1,503 | AAAAA | 103 |
| 564 and above | 1,504 and above | AAAAAA | 96 |

=== Classifications for Football ===
| District | Counties | A | AA | AAA | AAAA | AAAAA | AAAAAA | Total |
|---|---|---|---|---|---|---|---|---|
| District 1 | Bucks, Chester, Delaware, and Montgomery | 3 | 2 | 3 | 6 | 26 | 33 | 73 |
| District 2 | Lackawanna, Luzerne, Pike, Susquehanna, Wayne and Wyoming | 4 | 7 | 8 | 11 | 3 | 3 | 36 |
| District 3 | Adams, Berks, Cumberland, Dauphin, Franklin, Juniata, Lancaster, Lebanon, Perry and York | 4 | 7 | 15 | 21 | 29 | 16 | 92 |
| District 4 | Bradford, Columbia, Lycoming, Montour, Northumberland, Snyder, Sullivan, Tioga and Union | 6 | 12 | 7 | 7 | 0 | 1 | 33 |
| District 5 | Bedford, Fulton and Somerset | 7 | 3 | 1 | 1 | 0 | 0 | 12 |
| District 6 | Blair, Cambria, Centre, Clearfield, Clinton, Huntingdon, Indiana and Mifflin | 19 | 12 | 9 | 2 | 2 | 3 | 47 |
| District 7 | Allegheny (excluding City of Pittsburgh), Armstrong, Beaver, Butler, Fayette, Greene, Indiana, Lawrence, Washington and Westmoreland | 23 | 24 | 23 | 18 | 18 | 13 | 119 |
| District 8 | Pittsburgh Public Schools | 0 | 1 | 1 | 2 | 1 | 1 | 6 |
| District 9 | Cameron, Clarion, Elk, Jefferson, McKean and Potter | 13 | 5 | 3 | 3 | 0 | 0 | 24 |
| District 10 | Crawford, Erie, Forest, Mercer, Venango and Warren | 6 | 13 | 9 | 2 | 10 | 1 | 41 |
| District 11 | Carbon, Lehigh, Monroe, Northampton and Schuylkill | 5 | 6 | 11 | 7 | 4 | 13 | 46 |
| District 12 | Philadelphia Catholic League and the Public League | 0 | 4 | 6 | 9 | 10 | 12 | 41 |
| Total | | 90 | 96 | 96 | 89 | 103 | 96 | 570 |

Because the PIAA determines classifications separately for each gender in each sport, it is possible that a coeducational school may find its boys' and girls' teams in different classes in the same sport. Smaller schools can choose to compete at a higher classification—possible reasons are to maintain existing rivalries, or in rare cases to place their boys' and girls' teams in the same class—but larger schools can not choose to compete at a lower classification level. For purposes of all-star games and awards, the A and AA classes are referred to as small schools, AAA and AAAA are referred to as mid-sized schools, while AAAAA and AAAAAA referred as large schools. In 2016, there was a change, splitting the football tournament into six classifications, instead of the previous four. The PIAA made the decision to expand to six classes in Football, as well as Boys and Girls basketball, baseball and softball. Increasing to four classes is Boys and Girls Soccer, Girls volleyball. Field Hockey is expanded to three classes, and Boys and Girls Lacrosse to two. Football started using these classes with the 2016 season.

== State championships ==
While some sports' championship games have been held at various venues and cities across the state, most have been held in Hershey, whose proximity to the Pennsylvania Turnpike, and Interstates 81, and 83 makes it a convenient location for teams from around the state. Hersheypark Stadium hosts the football, soccer, and lacrosse championships. The Giant Center hosts the basketball, wrestling, and competitive spirit championships. The Hershey Racquet Club hosts the tennis championships.

In 2006, the PIAA announced that they had refused Hershey's application for a contract extension to host the basketball championships at Giant Center. Starting for the 2006–2007 season, the eight championship games will be played at Penn State's Bryce Jordan Center. The PIAA cited monetary reasons for the move. As of 2014 they had returned to the Giant Center.

Even the non-PIAA sport of ice hockey hosted the 2005 Pennsylvania Cup championship at Hersheypark Arena. The PIAA football championships have been held since 1988, with the first games being held at various sites across the state. In 1992, the games were moved to Altoona's Mansion Park, in part because playing four games in two days would not affect the artificial turf playing surface on the field. The football championships were moved to Hershey in 1998 to add to the tradition of PIAA championship competition near the state capital.

Penn State University in State College hosts the baseball and softball championships. Altoona previously hosted the baseball championships at Peoples Natural Gas Field, home of the Altoona Curve of the Class AA Eastern League. The track and field championships are held at Seth Grove Stadium on the campus of Shippensburg University in Shippensburg.

In 2022, PIAA approved the use of the athletic facilities of Cumberland Valley School District as the new home for state sporting championships. The sporting finals held at these facilities are boys'/girls' soccer, field hockey, football, and girls' volleyball.

== Championship sites ==
=== Fall ===
| Sport | Facility | Location | Gender(s) | Classifications |
|---|---|---|---|---|
| Cross Country | Big Spring High School | Newville | Boys & Girls | A,AA, AAA |
| Field Hockey | Cumberland Valley High School | Mechanicsburg | Girls | A, AA, AAA |
| Football | Cumberland Valley High School | Mechanicsburg | Boys | A, AA, AAA, AAAA, AAAAA, AAAAAA |
| Golf | Penn State Golf Courses | State College | Boys & Girls | AA, AAA |
| Soccer | Cumberland Valley High School | Mechanicsburg | Boys & Girls | A, AA, AAA, AAAA |
| Tennis | Hershey Racquet Club | Hershey | Girls | AA, AAA |
| Volleyball | Cumberland Valley High School | Mechanicsburg | Girls | A, AA, AAA, AAAA |

=== Winter ===
| Sport | Facility | Location | Gender(s) | Classifications |
|---|---|---|---|---|
| Basketball | Giant Center | Hershey | Boys & Girls | A, AA, AAA, AAAA, AAAAA, AAAAAA |
| Competitive Spirit | Giant Center | Hershey | Boys & Girls | AA, AAA (Small, Large), Coed |
| Swimming & Diving | Kinney Natatorium | Lewisburg | Boys & Girls | AA, AAA |
| Wrestling | Giant Center | Hershey | Boys | AA, AAA |

=== Spring ===
| Sport | Facility | Location | Gender(s) | Classifications |
|---|---|---|---|---|
| Baseball | Medlar Field | State College | Boys | A, AA, AAA, AAAA, AAAAA, AAAAAA |
| Lacrosse | Panzer Stadium | State College | Boys & Girls | AA, AAA |
| Softball | Nittany Lion Softball Park | State College | Girls | A, AA, AAA, AAAA, AAAAA, AAAAAA |
| Tennis | Hershey Racquet Club | Hershey | Boys | AA, AAA |
| Track & Field | Seth Grove Stadium | Shippensburg | Boys & Girls | AA, AAA |
| Volleyball | Rec Hall | State College | Boys | AA, AAA |

== See also ==
- PIAA Football Teams, Conferences and Leagues
- NFHS
