= Tuscarora Township, Pennsylvania =

Tuscarora Township is the name of some places in the U.S. state of Pennsylvania:

- Tuscarora Township, Bradford County, Pennsylvania
- Tuscarora Township, Juniata County, Pennsylvania
- Tuscarora Township, Perry County, Pennsylvania
