= Tuscarora =

Tuscarora may refer to the following:

== First nations and Native American people and culture ==
- Tuscarora people
  - Federal Power Commission v. Tuscarora Indian Nation (1960)
- Tuscarora language, an Iroquoian language of the Tuscarora people
- Tuscarora Reservation, territory of the Tuscarora Nation in New York
- Tuscarora War, fought in North Carolina during the autumn of 1711 until 11 February 1715

== Places ==
In Maryland

- Tuscarora, Maryland, a census-designated place in Frederick County
- Tuscarora High School (Maryland), in Frederick

In Michigan

- Tuscarora Township, Michigan

In Nevada

- Tuscarora, Nevada, a town in Elko County
- Tuscarora Mountains, a range in Elko County

In New York

- Tuscarora, New York, a town in Steuben County
- Tuscarora (CDP), New York, a hamlet in Livingston County
- Tuscarora Reservation, an Indian reservation in the town of Lewiston
- Camp Tuscarora, a Boy Scouts of America camp in New York State's Southern Tier

In North Dakota

- Tuscarora Township, Pierce County, North Dakota

In Pennsylvania

- Tuscarora, Pennsylvania, a census-designated place in Schuylkill County
- Tuscarora Falls, one of 24 named waterfalls in Ricketts Glen State Park in Luzerne County
- Tuscarora Mountain
  - Tuscarora Mountain Tunnel, Pennsylvania Turnpike
- Tuscarora State Forest
- Tuscarora Township, Bradford County, Pennsylvania
- Tuscarora Township, Juniata County, Pennsylvania
- Tuscarora Township, Perry County, Pennsylvania
- Tuscarora Trail, a hiking trail that splits off from the Appalachian Trail
- Tuscarora School District, in southern Pennsylvania

In Virginia

- Tuscarora High School (Virginia), in Leesburg

== Other ==
- USS Tuscarora (1861), U.S. Navy American Civil War ship
- CSS Tuscarora, Confederate States ship
- USRC Tuscarora, U.S. Revenue Cutter Service and U.S Coast Guard cutter in commission from 1902–1936
- Tuscarora Creek (disambiguation), several waterways
- The Tuscarora, Captain Alfred Bulltop Stormalong's legendary ship
- Tuscarora Formation, a geologic unit in the Appalachian Mountains
- Tuscarora Gas Pipeline, a gas pipeline running from Malin, Oregon to Wadsworth, Nevada
- Tuscarora Phillips, the character played by Christopher Mitchum in the 1970 Howard Hawks' film Rio Lobo
- Mount Tuscarora (Utah), a summit in the Wasatch Range
