= Lewistown Area High School =

Coordinates: 40.5944°N 77.5614°W

Location
- 2 Manor Drive; Lewistown, Pennsylvania 17044; United States

Information
- School type: Public, High School
- Opened: 1976
- Closed: 2011
- School district: Mifflin County School District
- Principal: Michael V. Zinobile
- Grades: 9-12
- Enrollment: 913
- Average class size: 36
- Hours in school day: 8:10 am to 3:10 pm
- Campus type: Rural
- Colors: Blue & White
- Mascot: Panther
- Website: www.mcsdk12.org/lahs/

Lewistown Area High School was founded in September 1976 and was one of two high schools in Mifflin County, Pennsylvania. It served residents of the Borough of Lewistown and communities to the borough's south and west. It was part of the Mifflin County School District.

== History ==
In 1971, the Mifflin County School District merged the four high schools in the county into one. (Lewistown-Granville, Rothrock, Chief Logan, and Kishacoquillas) Since the school district did not have a building large enough to accommodate the combined student population, a new one was built. This building is now the present day Lewistown Area High School. The building was slated to be a state-of-the-art school for the time period; equipped with a large auditorium and balcony, and a television studio.

It also featured an experimental "open classroom" design. There were no walls between classes of similar subjects. For example, all English classes (9th–12th grades) were in one large room, though students sat facing different directions. Eventually, room dividers were put in place and in the mid-1990s, permanent walls were constructed in the large rooms to resemble standard designs.

In 1976, following the '75–'76 school year, Chief Logan High (which had been hosting half of the Penn Highlands students until completion of the new school) and Kishacoquillas High were restored. Since the Mifflin County School District built the open space Lewistown Area High School, the school district combined Lewistown-Granville High and nearby McVeytown's Rothrock High into one school and moved those students into the renamed present day Lewistown Area High School.

In 1989, the Chief Logan and Kishacoquillas High Schools were combined to create Indian Valley High School. It is located at the former Chief Logan High School in Highland Park, Pennsylvania. The former Kishacoquillas High School is now the Indian Valley Middle School in Reedsville, Pennsylvania.

On March 27, 2008, President Bill Clinton visited Lewistown Area High School and gave a speech supporting Hillary Clinton's run for president. It was closed in 2011 and merged with Mifflin County High School.

== Athletics ==
Lewistown's athletic teams were called the Panthers and their colors were blue and white. The school's original colors were maroon and silver, but were changed after the break-up of Penn Highlands High School, as the new incarnation of Lewistown High inherited the blue and white sports and band uniforms of the defunct Penn Highlands school.

Lewistown Area High School sponsored the following sports:

- Boys: Cross Country, Football, Soccer, Golf, Basketball, Baseball, Wrestling, Tennis, Track & Field, Bowling
- Girls: Cross Country, Soccer, Field Hockey, Volleyball, Basketball, Softball, Tennis, Golf, Track & Field, Bowling
