= Mifflintown, Pennsylvania =

Borough in Pennsylvania, US

- Borough
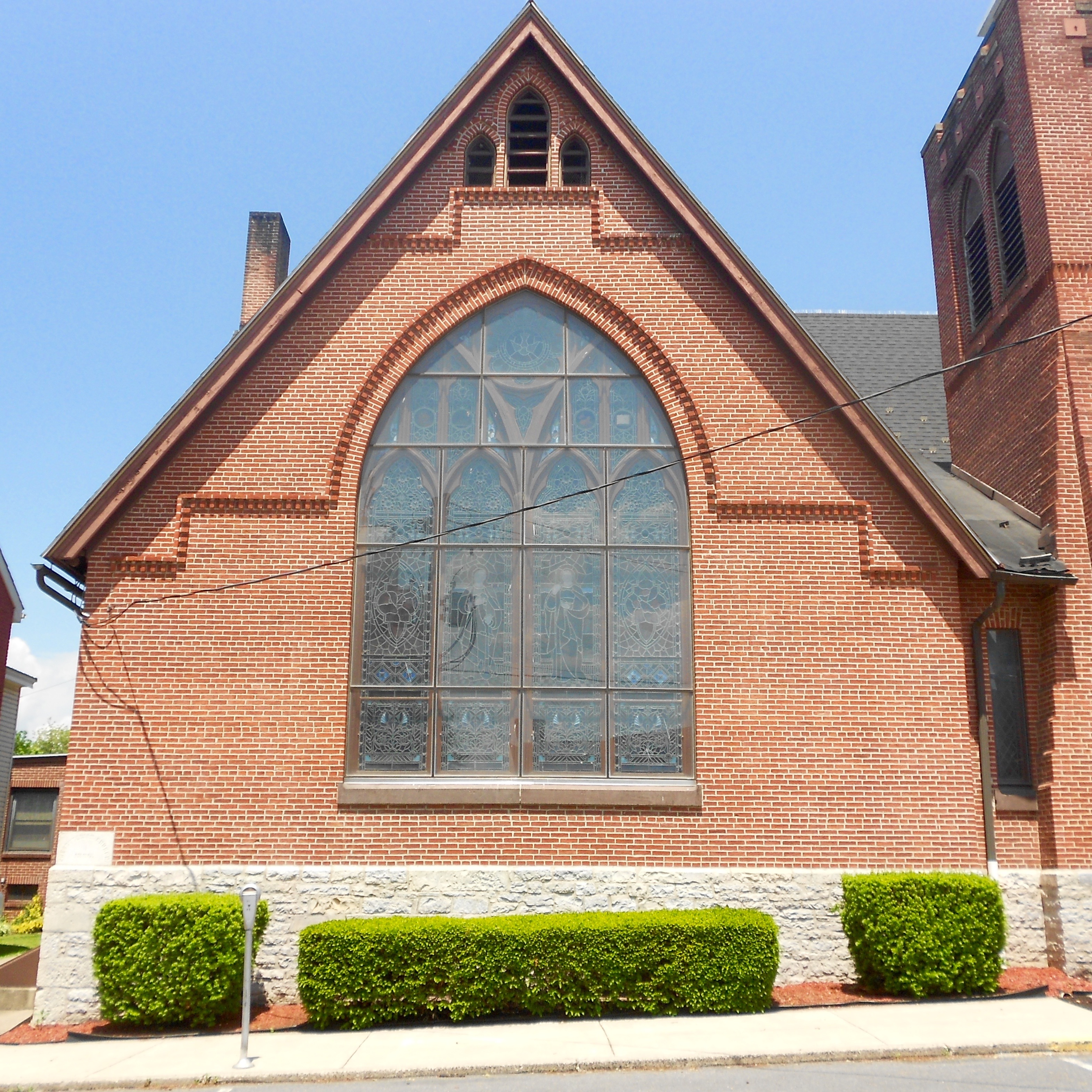
- Westminster Presbyterian Church

- Location of Mifflintown in Juniata County, Pennsylvania.

- Location within Pennsylvania Location within the United States
- Coordinates: 40°34′15″N 77°23′44″W
- Country: United States
- State: Pennsylvania
- County: Juniata
- Settled: 1790
- Incorporated: 1833

Area
  - Total: 0.14 sq mi (0.36 km^{2})
  - Land: 0.14 sq mi (0.36 km^{2})
  - Water: 0 sq mi (0.00 km^{2})
- Elevation (center of borough): 469 ft (143 m)
- Highest elevation (northeastn boundary of borough): 580 ft (180 m)
- Lowest elevation (Juniata River): 418 ft (127 m)

Population (2020)
  - Total: 840
  - Density: 5,995.5/sq mi (2,314.87/km^{2})
- Time zone: UTC-5 (Eastern (EST))
  - Summer (DST): UTC-4 (EDT)
- Zip code: 17059
- Area code: 717
- FIPS code: 42-49304
- Website: Mifflintown Borough website

Mifflintown is a borough in and the county seat of Juniata County, Pennsylvania, United States. The population was 840 at the 2020 census.

== Geography ==
Mifflintown is located at 40°34′15″N 77°23′44″W (40.570728, -77.395488).

According to the United States Census Bureau, the borough has a total area of 0.1 square miles (0.26 km^{2}), all land.

== Demographics ==
Historical population
Census	Pop.	Note	%±
1850	485		—
1860	767		58.1%
1870	857		11.7%
1880	842		−1.8%
1890	877		4.2%
1900	953		8.7%
1910	954		0.1%
1920	1,083		13.5%
1930	1,027		−5.2%
1940	1,097		6.8%
1950	1,013		−7.7%
1960	887		−12.4%
1970	828		−6.7%
1980	783		−5.4%
1990	866		10.6%
2000	861		−0.6%
2010	936		8.7%
2020	840		−10.3%
2024 (est.)	824	▼	−1.9%

=== 2020 census ===
Mifflintown borough, Pennsylvania – Racial and Ethnic Composition (NH = Non-Hispanic) Note: the US Census treats Hispanic/Latino as an ethnic category. This table excludes Latinos from the racial categories and assigns them to a separate category. Hispanics/Latinos may be of any race.
Race / Ethnicity	Pop 2010	Pop 2020	% 2010	% 2020
White alone (NH)	748	578	79.91%	68.81%
Black or African American alone (NH)	5	7	0.53%	0.83%
Native American or Alaska Native alone (NH)	5	1	0.47%	0.12%
Asian alone (NH)	4	1	0.43%	0.12%
Pacific Islander alone (NH)	0	0	0.00%	0.00%
Some Other Race alone (NH)	0	2	0.00%	0.24%
Mixed Race/Multi-Racial (NH)	16	23	1.71%	2.74%
Hispanic or Latino (any race)	158	228	16.88%	27.14%
Total	936	840	100.00%	100.00%

=== 2000 census ===
As of the census of 2000, there were 861 people, 372 households, and 210 families residing in the borough. The population density was 6,184.9 inhabitants per square mile (2,388.0/km^{2}). There were 395 housing units at an average density of 2,837.4 units per square mile (1,095.5 units/km^{2}). The racial makeup of the borough was 93.96% White, 0.23% Native American, 0.23% Asian, 3.72% Pacific Islander, 1.39% from other races, and 0.46% from two or more races. Hispanic or Latino of any race were 8.71% of the population.

There were 372 households, out of which 28.0% had children under the age of 18 living with them, 40.3% were married couples living together, 12.9% had a female householder with no husband present, and 43.5% were non-families. 38.7% of all households were made up of individuals, and 18.8% had someone living alone who was 65 years of age or older. The average household size was 2.24 and the average family size was 2.97.

In the borough the population was spread out, with 25.2% under the age of 18, 8.5% from 18 to 24, 30.3% from 25 to 44, 20.9% from 45 to 64, and 15.1% who were 65 years of age or older. The median age was 36 years. For every 100 females there were 96.6 males. For every 100 females age 18 and over, there were 92.8 males.

The median income for a household in the borough was $28,125, and the median income for a family was $33,594. Males had a median income of $26,563 versus $20,125 for females. The per capita income for the borough was $14,394. About 10.7% of families and 13.7% of the population were below the poverty line, including 18.1% of those under age 18 and 17.0% of those age 65 or over.

There is a large Amish and Mennonite population around the borough.

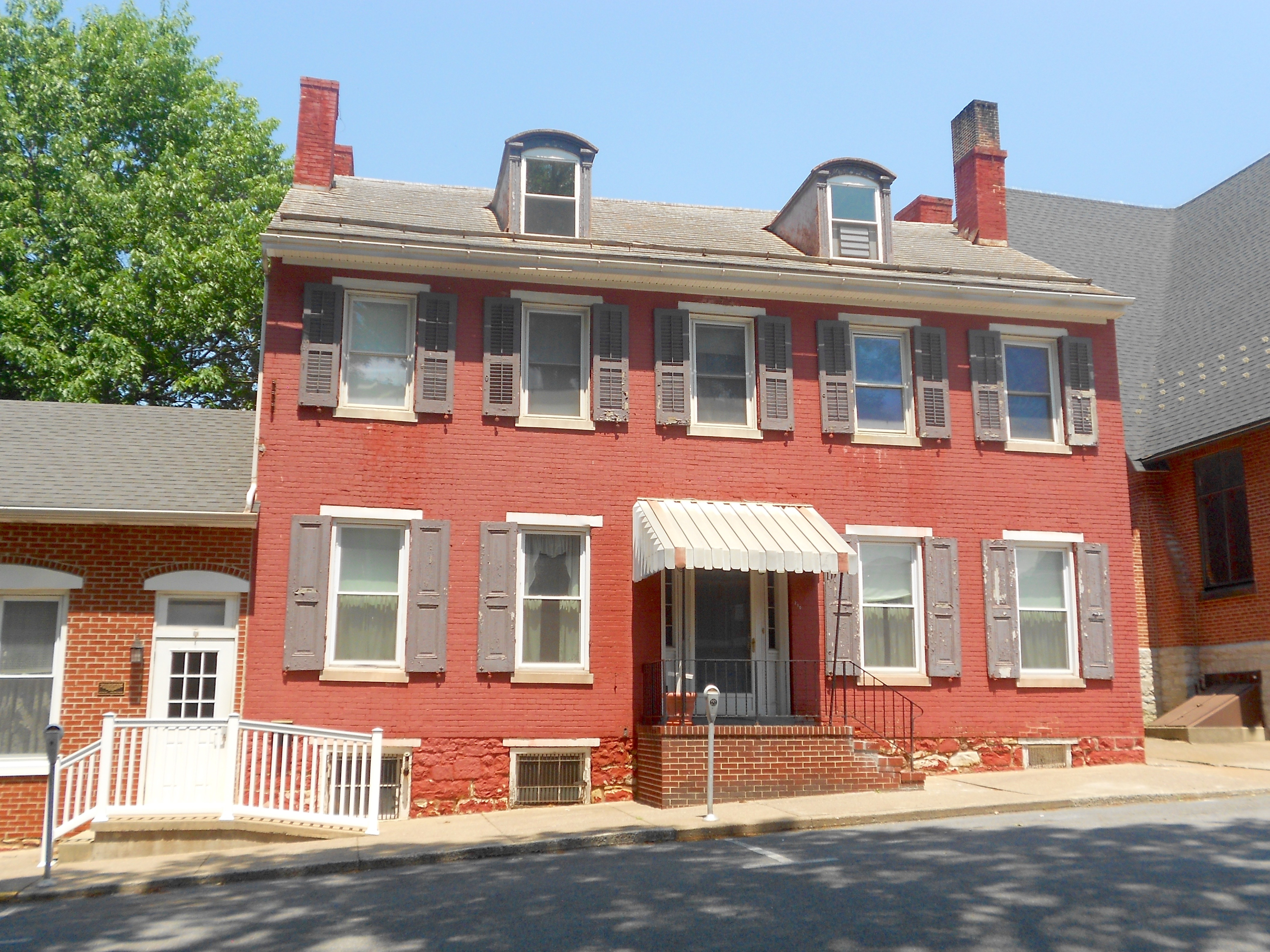
House near the courthouse

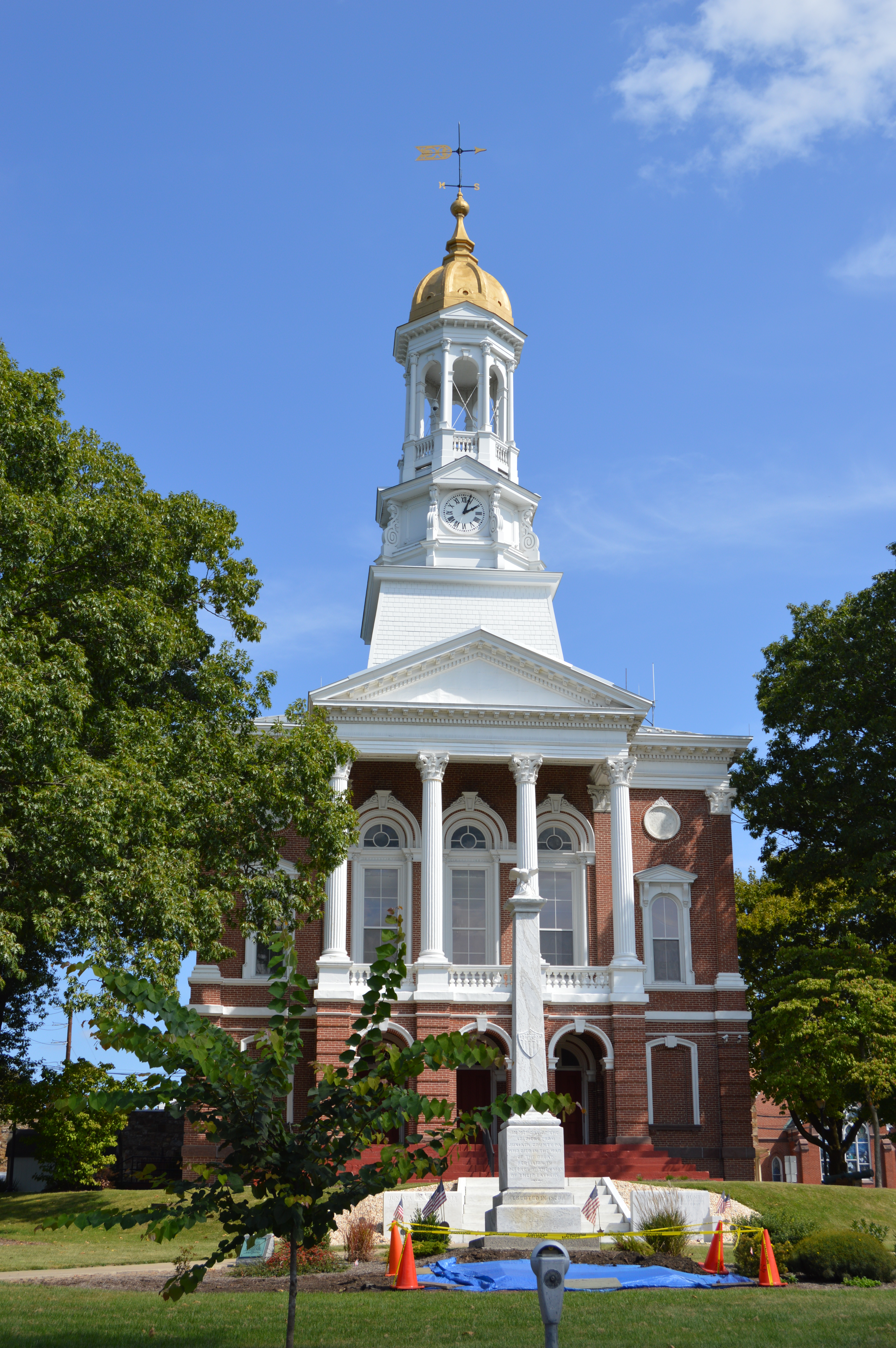
Juniata County Courthouse

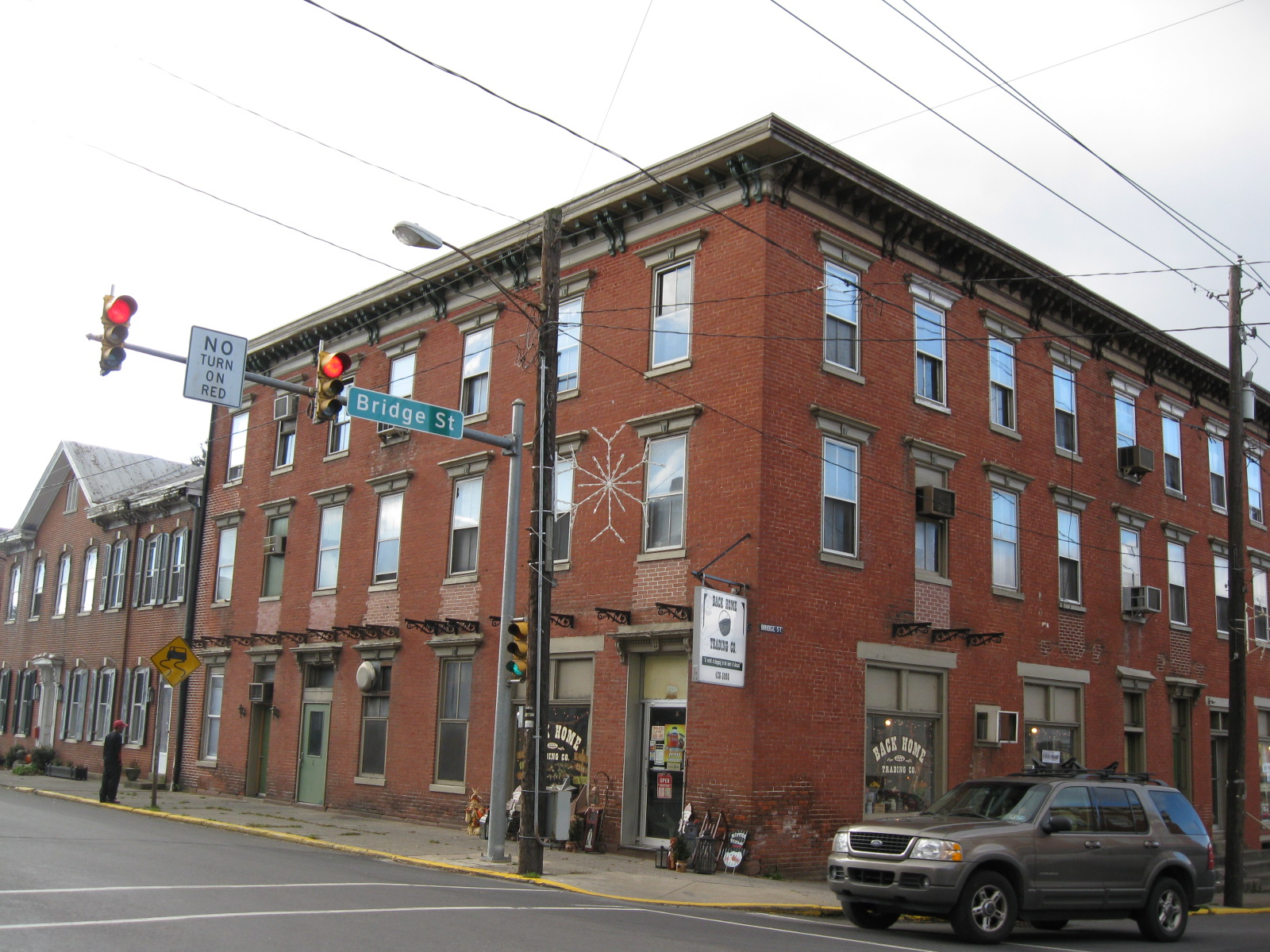
Building on Bridge Street

== Business ==
As the county seat of Juniata County, Mifflintown serves as the county's center of business and government. Given the borough's small size, as well as the county's small population, the presence of business and government remain limited. The Mifflintown borough boundaries limit the size of the community, meaning that retail and business functions necessarily spill over onto land of bordering municipalities.

Nevertheless, Mifflintown serves as the corporate headquarters of both the Juniata Valley Bank and Pennian Bank. Empire Kosher Poultry, the nation's largest producer of kosher poultry, has both its headquarters and processing facility in adjoining Fermanagh Township.

Land surrounding Mifflintown serves as Juniata County's retail center as well.

== Transportation ==
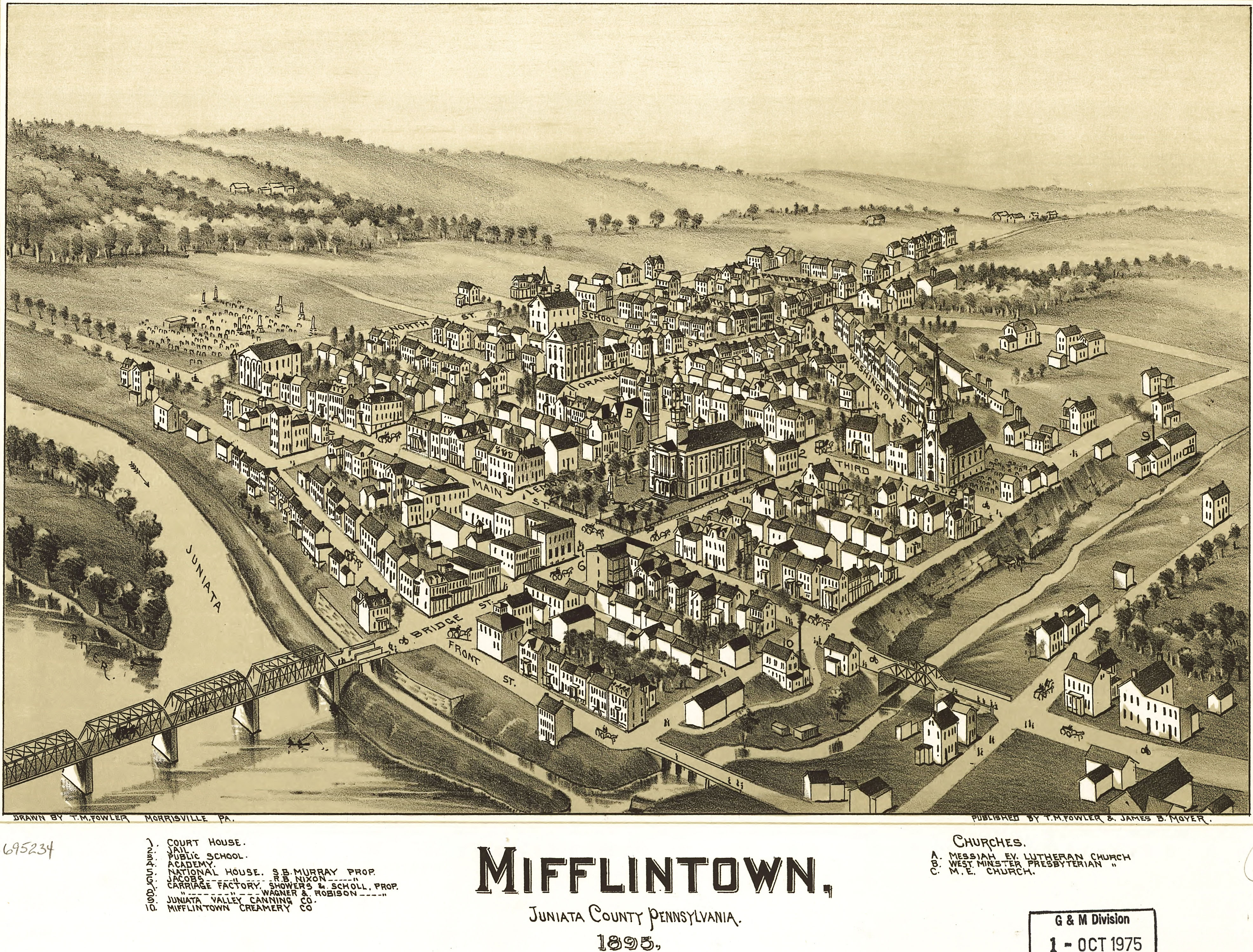
Illustrated map of Mifflintown in 1895

Pennsylvania Route 35, a southwest–northeast highway that serves as Juniata County's principal arterial highway running in that direction, forms the main street of Mifflintown. It intersects the former mainline of US routes 22 and 322, which was moved in the early 1970s to a four-lane bypass lying east of the town. The former Pennsylvania Railroad mainline tracks, now owned by the Norfolk Southern Railway, lie across the Juniata River in the adjoining town of Mifflin.

== Education ==
Mifflintown is the home of Juniata High School, which serves the southern half of the Juniata County School District. Tuscarora Junior High School and Juniata Elementary School are also located in the town.

== See also ==
- Impact of the 2019–20 coronavirus pandemic on the meat industry in the United States

Actress Nancy Kulp (most widely known as "Miss Jane Hathaway" on The Beverly Hillbillies) is buried in the Westminster Presbyterian Church cemetery. Physical educator Anna Scholl Espenschade was born in Mifflintown in 1903.
