= Juniata High School =

Coordinates: 40.547111°N 77.367154°W

Location
- 3931 William Penn Highway; Fermanagh Township; Mifflintown, Juniata County, Pennsylvania 17059; United States

Information
- School type: Public High School
- School district: Juniata County School District
- School number: NCES School ID: 421260006255
- Teaching staff: 36.02 (FTE)
- Grades: 9th-12th
- Enrollment: 517 (2023-2024)
- Student to teacher ratio: 14.35
- Language: English
- Colors: Red and Navy
- Athletics conference: PIAA District VI
- Team name: Indians
- Rival: East Juniata
- Communities served: East Waterford, Mexico, Mifflin, Mifflintown, Port Royal
- Feeder schools: Tuscarora Junior High
- Affiliations: Mifflin-Juniata Career and Technology Center, Tuscarora Intermediate Unit 11
- Website: https://jhs.jcsdk12.org/o/jhs

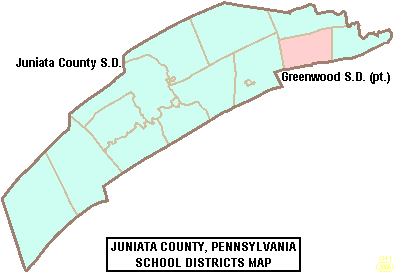
School District region in Juniata County

Juniata High School is a small, rural, public high school which is one of two high schools operated by the Juniata County School District. The students reside in the central and western portions of Juniata County in central Pennsylvania. The campus is located centrally in the county in Fermanagh Township and is shared with the school's sole feeder school, Tuscarora Junior High School. Juniata High School provides grades 9th through 12th. In the 2016–2017 school year, it had 587 students.

== Extracurriculars ==
The Juniata County School District offers a wide variety of clubs, activities and sports at Juniata High School. The School offers: FFA, band and chorus, as well as Honor Society.

=== Athletics ===
Juniata High School participates in PIAA District VI and the Tri-Valley League.

- Baseball
- Basketball
- Cross Country
- Field Hockey - Co-op with East Juniata Junior/Senior High School (PIAA District IV)
- Football
- Golf - Co-op with East Juniata High School (PIAA District IV)
- Soccer
- Softball
- Tennis
- Track and Field
- Volleyball
- Wrestling
