= Mifflin-Juniata Career and Technology Center =

Mifflin County Academy of Science & Technology

Location
- 701 Pitt Street; Lewistown, Pennsylvania 17044

Information
- School type: Public Vocational-Technical School
- Opened: 1968
- Director: Laura Hicks
- Principal: Mark Crosson
- Faculty: 13
- Grades: 10-12
- Schedule type: Part-Time
- Colors: Maroon and Sand

Mifflin County Academy of Science & Technology is a comprehensive vocational education facility, serving around 500 high school students from public and private schools in Mifflin and Juniata counties in Pennsylvania. The school is located just outside Lewistown, the county seat of Mifflin County.

== School history ==
Mifflin-Juniata Career and Technology Center, built in 1968, is situated on approximately 20 acres and consists of the 81,136 square-foot school and an annex of 1,966 square feet. Most instructional areas include both classroom and laboratory/shop areas.

== School operation and sending districts ==
The Mifflin-Juniata Career and Technology Center is jointly operated by the Juniata and Mifflin County School Districts. Students completing at least grade nine from one of five sending high schools comprise the school's population. Students attending non-public schools in Juniata and Mifflin Counties are also eligible to attend Mifflin-Juniata Career and Technology Center. Enrollment averages about 500 students annually.

=== Sending high schools ===
- Mifflin County High School
- East Juniata Junior/Senior High School
- Juniata High School
- Belleville Mennonite School

== Program areas ==
There are 12 programs at the Academy, they include:

- Agriculture Science
- Auto Mechanics Technology
- Collision Repair
- Construction Trades
- Cosmetology
- Culinary Arts
- Early Childhood Education
- Electrical Installation
- Health Professions
- Mechatronics, Robotics, & Automation
- Precision Machining
- Welding Technology

== Clubs and activities ==
There are three clubs in which students can participate in. They include:

- Future Farmers of America (FFA)
- Health Occupations Students of America (HOSA)
- Skills USA

FFA and SkillsUSA have been in existence since the school opened in 1968.
