= Mifflin County High School =

Coordinates: 40.62537°N 77.56948°W

Location
- 501 Sixth Street; Lewistown, Pennsylvania 17044; United States

Information
- School type: Public
- Established: June 2011
- School district: Mifflin County School District
- School code: 392-263
- Principal: Kelly Campagna
- Faculty: 75.33 (FTE)
- Grades: 10–12
- Enrollment: 1,186 (2018-19)
- Student to teacher ratio: 15.74
- Language: English
- Colors: Purple, black, silver
- Athletics: PIAA District VI
- Athletics conference: Mid-Penn Conference
- Team name: Huskies
- Feeder schools: Mifflin Co. Junior High School; Mifflin County Middle School

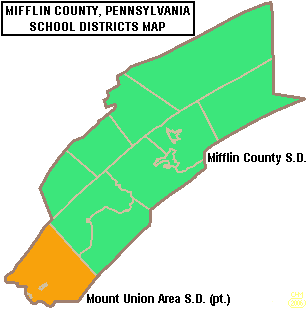
School District region in Mifflin County

Mifflin County High School is a mid sized, rural public high school. It is the sole high school operated by the Mifflin County School District. The school was established in 2011, by the merging of the district's two former high schools (Indian Valley High School and Lewistown Area). This move was due to budget cuts and aging facilities in the other schools. Construction of Mifflin County High School cost $64 million in 2011. Local public debt was used to finance the building. The 251,088 square foot building was built by Hayes Large Architects, LLP. In the 2018–19 school year, the school's enrollment was reported as 1,186.

Students may choose to attend Mifflin-Juniata Career and Technology Center for training in the building trades, allied health services and culinary arts. Students may also choose a full or partial online study program called the ALPHA Program. Pupils in ALPHA use Blended learning to earn 21.5 credits to graduate. Students are not permitted to use the program to graduate early or earn credits ahead.

The Tuscarora Intermediate Unit IU11 provides the school with a wide variety of services like specialized education for disabled students and hearing, speech and visual disability services and professional development for staff and faculty

== Vocational-Education ==
Students of Mifflin County may pursue a vocational trade at the nearby Academy of Science and Technology in Lewistown for part of their school day while attending MCHS for the other half.

== Extracurriculars ==
Mifflin County School District offers a variety of clubs, activities and sports.

=== Athletics ===
MCHS participates in PIAA District VI. However, due to the lack of Class AAAA schools in District VI, Mifflin County is part of the Mid-Penn Conference.

The school provides:

Varsity

Boys

- Baseball - AAAA
- Basketball - AAAA
- Bowling - AAAA
- Cross country - AAA
- Football - AAAA
- Golf - AAA
- Indoor track and field - AAAA
- Soccer - AAA
- Swimming and diving - AAA
- Tennis - AAA
- Track and field - AAA
- Wrestling - AAA

Girls

- Basketball - AAAA
- Bowling - AAAA
- Cross country - AAA
- Indoor track and field - AAAA
- Field hockey - AAA
- Soccer - AAA
- Softball - AAAA
- Swimming and diving - AAA
- Tennis - AAA
- Track and field - AAA
- Volleyball - AAA

According to PIAA directory July 2014

== See also ==
- Lewistown, Pennsylvania
