= Highland Park, Pennsylvania =

Unincorporated community in Pennsylvania, US

Highland Park
- Census-designated place
- Location within the U.S. state of Pennsylvania Highland Park (the United States)
- Coordinates: 40°37′10″N 77°33′58″W
- Country: United States
- State: Pennsylvania
- County: Mifflin

Area
  - Total: 0.74 sq mi (1.92 km^{2})
  - Land: 0.74 sq mi (1.92 km^{2})
  - Water: 0 sq mi (0.00 km^{2})

Population (2020)
  - Total: 1,317
  - Density: 1,778/sq mi (686.4/km^{2})
- Time zone: UTC-5 (Eastern (EST))
  - Summer (DST): UTC-4 (EDT)
- FIPS code: 42-34592

Highland Park is a census-designated place (CDP) in Mifflin County, Pennsylvania, United States. The population was 1,446 at the time of the 2000 census.

== General information ==
- ZIP Code: 17044
- Area Code: 717
- Local Phone Exchanges: 242, 247, 248
- School District: Mifflin County School District

== Geography ==
Highland Park is located at 40°37′10″N 77°33′58″W (40.619420, -77.566009).

According to the United States Census Bureau, the CDP has a total area of 0.7 square miles (1.8 km^{2}), all of it land.

== Demographics ==
Historical population
Census	Pop.	Note	%±
2020	1,317		—
U.S. Decennial Census

As of the census of 2000, there were 1,446 people, 594 households, and 374 families residing in the CDP.

The population density was 1,958.7 inhabitants per square mile (756.3/km^{2}). There were 624 housing units at an average density of 845.3 per square mile (326.4/km^{2}).

The racial makeup of the CDP was 98.20% White, 0.35% African American, 0.41% Asian, 0.62% from other races, and 0.41% from two or more races. Hispanic or Latino of any race were 1.04% of the population.

There were 594 households, out of which 22.6% had children under the age of eighteen living with them; 53.2% were married couples living together, 7.2% had a female householder with no husband present, and 36.9% were non-families. 33.5% of all households were made up of individuals, and 20.0% had someone living alone who was sity-five years of age or older.

The average household size was 2.23 and the average family size was 2.81.

In the CDP, the population was spread out, with 18.5% under the age of eighteen, 4.6% from eighteen to twenty-four, 21.4% from twenty-five to forty-four, 25.9% from forty-five to sixty-four, and 29.5% who were sixty-five years of age or older. The median age was forty-nine years.

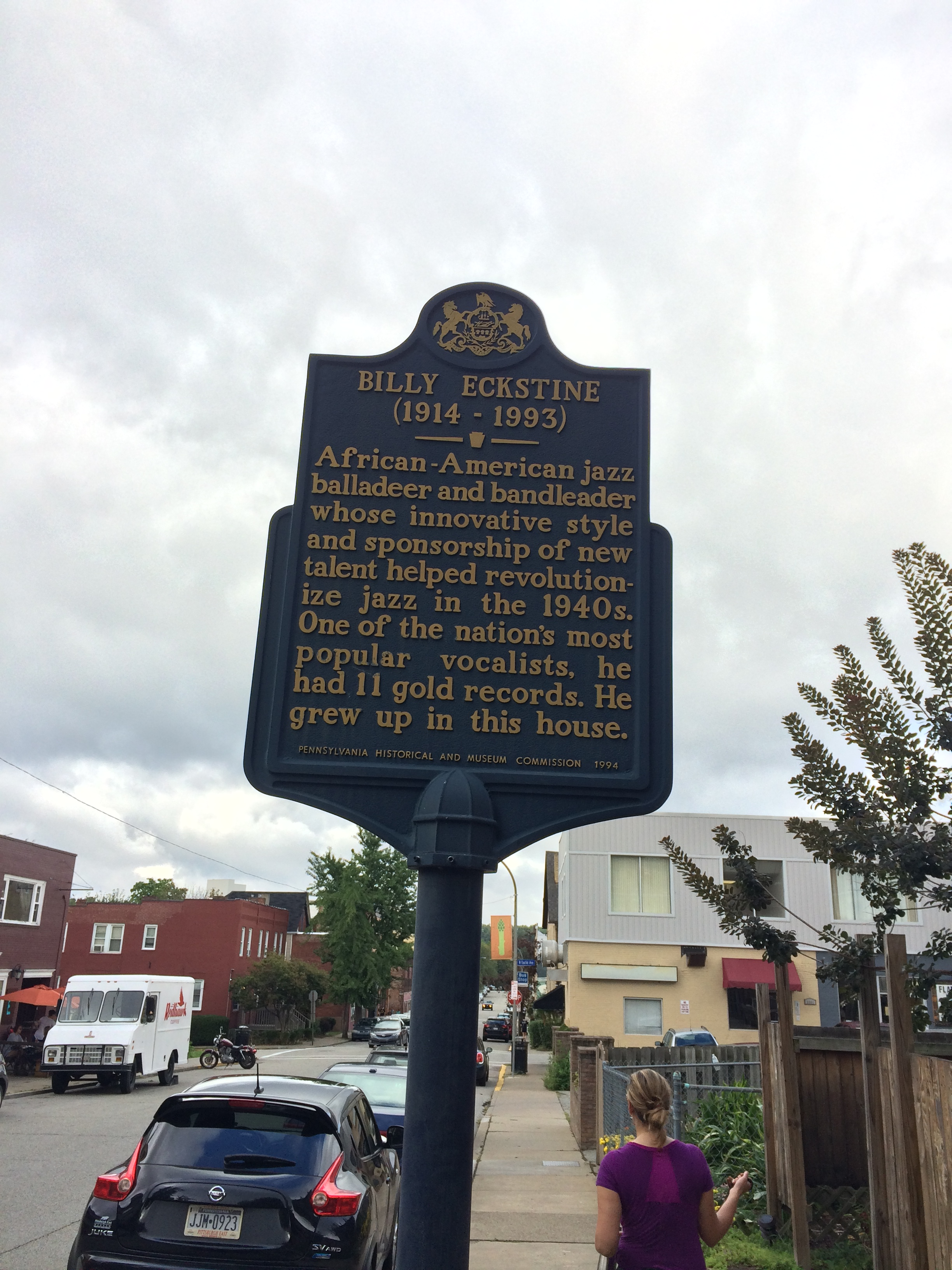
Billy Eckstein's historical marker, Highland Park

For every one hundred females, there were 78.7 males. For every one hundred females who were aged eighteen or older, there were 73.2 males.

The median income for a household in the CDP was $38,125, and the median income for a family was $46,000. Males had a median income of $33,015 compared with that of $28,819 for females.

The per capita income for the CDP was $19,422.

Roughly 4.7% of families and 6.2% of the population were living below the poverty line, including 9.0% of those who were under the age of eighteen. No one who was aged sixty-five or older was living in poverty.

== Notable people ==
Jazz musician Billy Eckstine was born in Highland; there is a State Historical Marker at the house where he grew up, 5913 Bryant Street, Highland Park.
