= Lack Township, Juniata County, Pennsylvania =

Township in Pennsylvania, US

Coordinates: 40°21′00″N 77°40′59″W

Lack Township, Pennsylvania
- Township
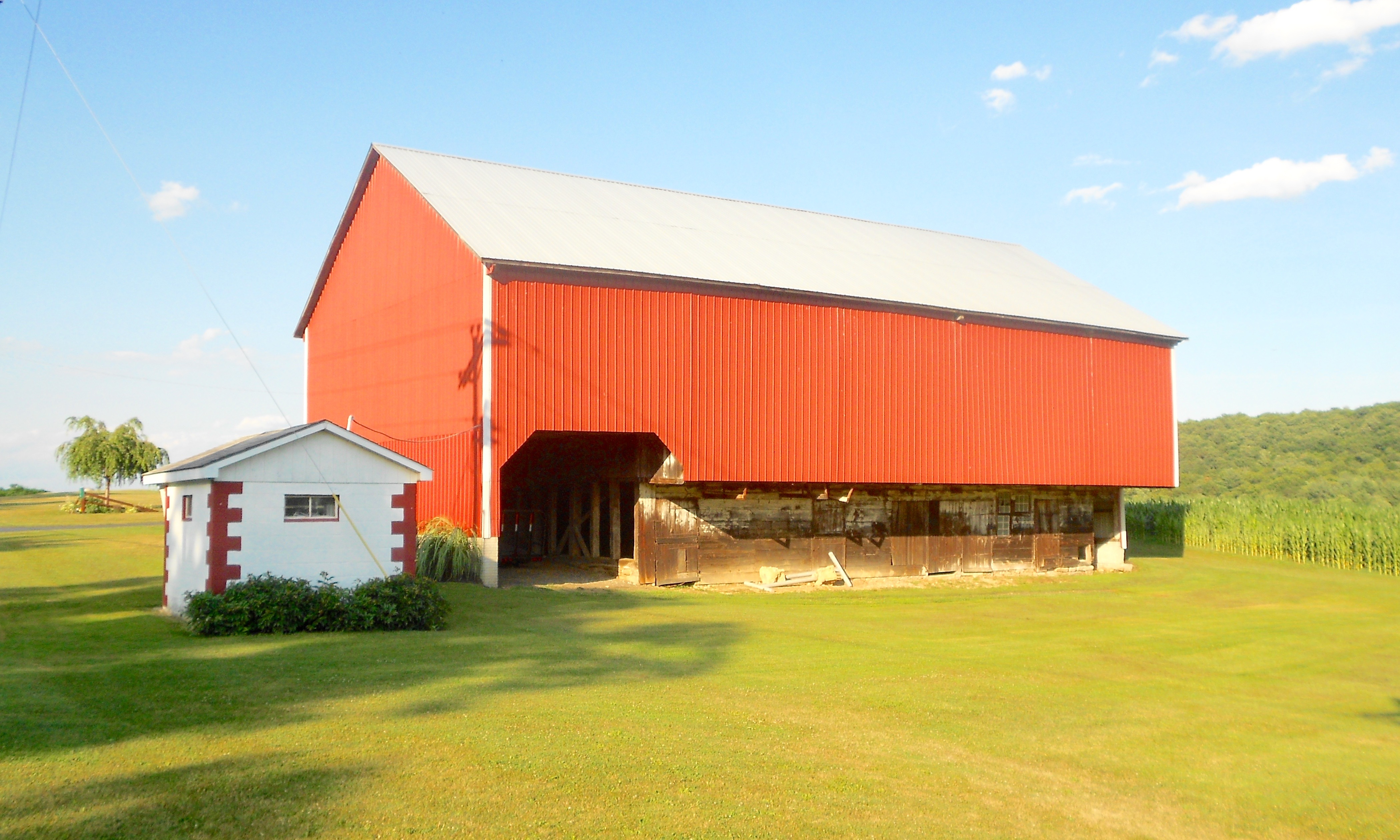
- Barn on PA 35

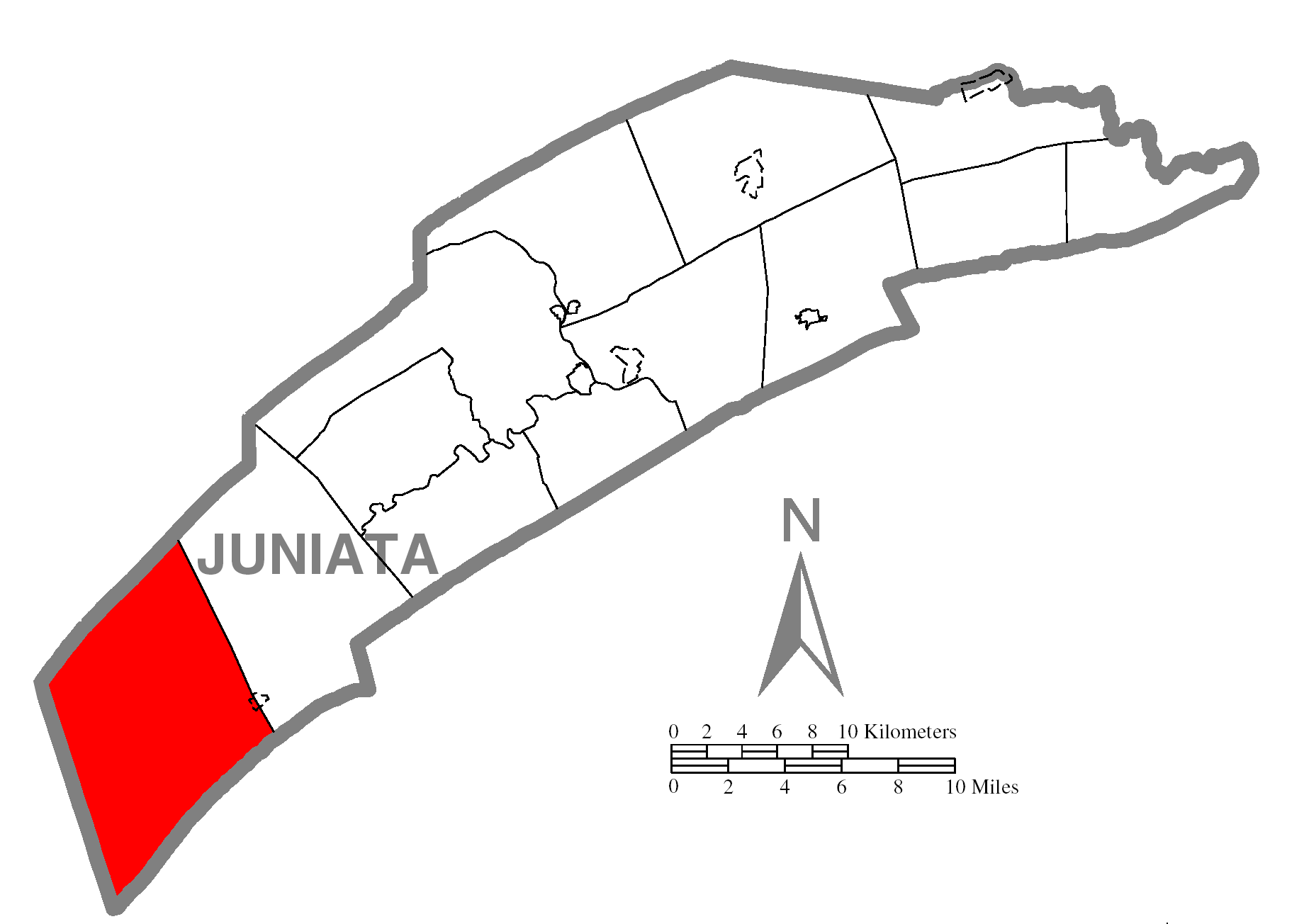
- Map of Juniata County, Pennsylvania highlighting Lack Township

- Map of Juniata County, Pennsylvania
- Country: United States
- State: Pennsylvania
- County: Juniata
- Settled: 1754
- Incorporated: 1754

Area
  - Total: 57.03 sq mi (147.71 km^{2})
  - Land: 57.03 sq mi (147.71 km^{2})
  - Water: 0 sq mi (0.00 km^{2})

Population (2020)
  - Total: 637 ▼
  - Estimate (2022): 629
  - Density: 13.7/sq mi (5.28/km^{2})
- Time zone: UTC-5 (EST)
  - Summer (DST): UTC-4 (EDT)
- Area code: 717
- FIPS code: 42-067-40752

Lack Township is a township that is located in Juniata County, Pennsylvania, United States. The population was 637 at the time of the 2020 census.

== History ==
This American township was named by Irish settlers, most likely after Lack, County Fermanagh, although also possibly after Leck, of which there are several places of that name in the Province of Ulster.

== Geography ==
According to the United States Census Bureau, the township has a total area of 57.0 square miles (147.7 km^{2}), all land.

The township is located within the Ridge and Valley province of the Appalachian Mountains. Blacklog Mountain forms the northwest border of the township, and Shade Mountain runs parallel to it, 2 miles (3 km) to the southeast. Tuscarora Mountain forms the southeast border of the township. Tuscarora Creek, a northeast-flowing tributary of the Juniata River, runs through the largest valley in the township at the northwestern base of Tuscarora Mountain. Pennsylvania Route 75 traverses the Tuscarora Creek valley, leading northeast to Port Royal and southwest to the Pennsylvania Turnpike in Franklin County.

Pennsylvania Route 35 runs in the same direction through a smaller valley at the southeast foot of Shade Mountain; the highway leads northeast to Mifflin and southwest to Shade Gap.

Lack Township occupies the southwestern end of Juniata County and is bordered by Mifflin County to the northwest, Tuscarora Township to the northeast, Perry and Franklin Counties to the southeast and Huntingdon County to the southwest.

Unincorporated communities in the township include Blacklog and Krause in the valley between Blacklog Mountain and Shade Mountain, Cross Keys and Peru Mills along Pennsylvania Route 35, and Spears Grove, Waterloo, and Perulack along Pennsylvania Route 75 (PA 75). East Waterford, a census-designated place largely in Tuscarora Township, extends west into Lack Township along PA 75.

== Demographics ==
Historical population
Census	Pop.	Note	%±
1850	1,146		—
1860	1,340		16.9%
1870	1,290		−3.7%
1880	1,439		11.6%
1890	1,221		−15.1%
1900	1,208		−1.1%
1910	1,117		−7.5%
1920	971		−13.1%
1930	782		−19.5%
1940	839		7.3%
1950	798		−4.9%
1960	723		−9.4%
1970	650		−10.1%
1980	616		−5.2%
1990	714		15.9%
2000	750		5.0%
2010	785		4.7%
2020	637		−18.9%
2022 (est.)	629		−1.3%
U.S. Decennial Census

As of the census of 2000, there were 750 people, 292 households, and 219 families residing in the township. The population density was 13.2 people per square mile (5.1/km^{2}). There were 570 housing units at an average density of 10.0/sq mi (3.9/km^{2}). The racial makeup of the township was 99.07% White, 0.13% African American, and 0.80% from two or more races. Hispanic or Latino of any race were 0.27% of the population.

There were 292 households, out of which 27.4% had children under the age of eighteen living with them; 61.6% were married couples living together, 4.5% had a female householder with no husband present, and 24.7% were non-families. 20.9% of all households were made up of individuals, and 11.3% had someone living alone who was sixty-five years of age or older.

The average household size was 2.57 and the average family size was 2.95.

Within the township, the population was spread out, with 23.2% who were under the age of eighteen, 8.7% who were aged eighteen to twenty-four, 22.8% who were aged twenty-five to fort-four, 29.3% who were aged forty-five to sixty-four, and 16.0% who were sixty-five years of age or older. The median age was forty-two years.

For every one hundred females, there were 103.3 males. For every one hundred females who were aged eighteen or older, there were 111.8 males.

The median income for a household in the township was $29,565, and the median income for a family was $32,115. Males had a median income of $26,635 compared with that of $19,063 for females.

The per capita income for the township was $14,016.

Approximately 9.0% of families and 14.9% of the population were living below the poverty line, including 28.4% of those who were under the age of eighteen and 7.9% of those who were aged sixty-five or older.
