= Spruce Hill Township, Pennsylvania =

Township in Pennsylvania, US

Coordinates: 40°27′00″N 77°30′59″W

- Township
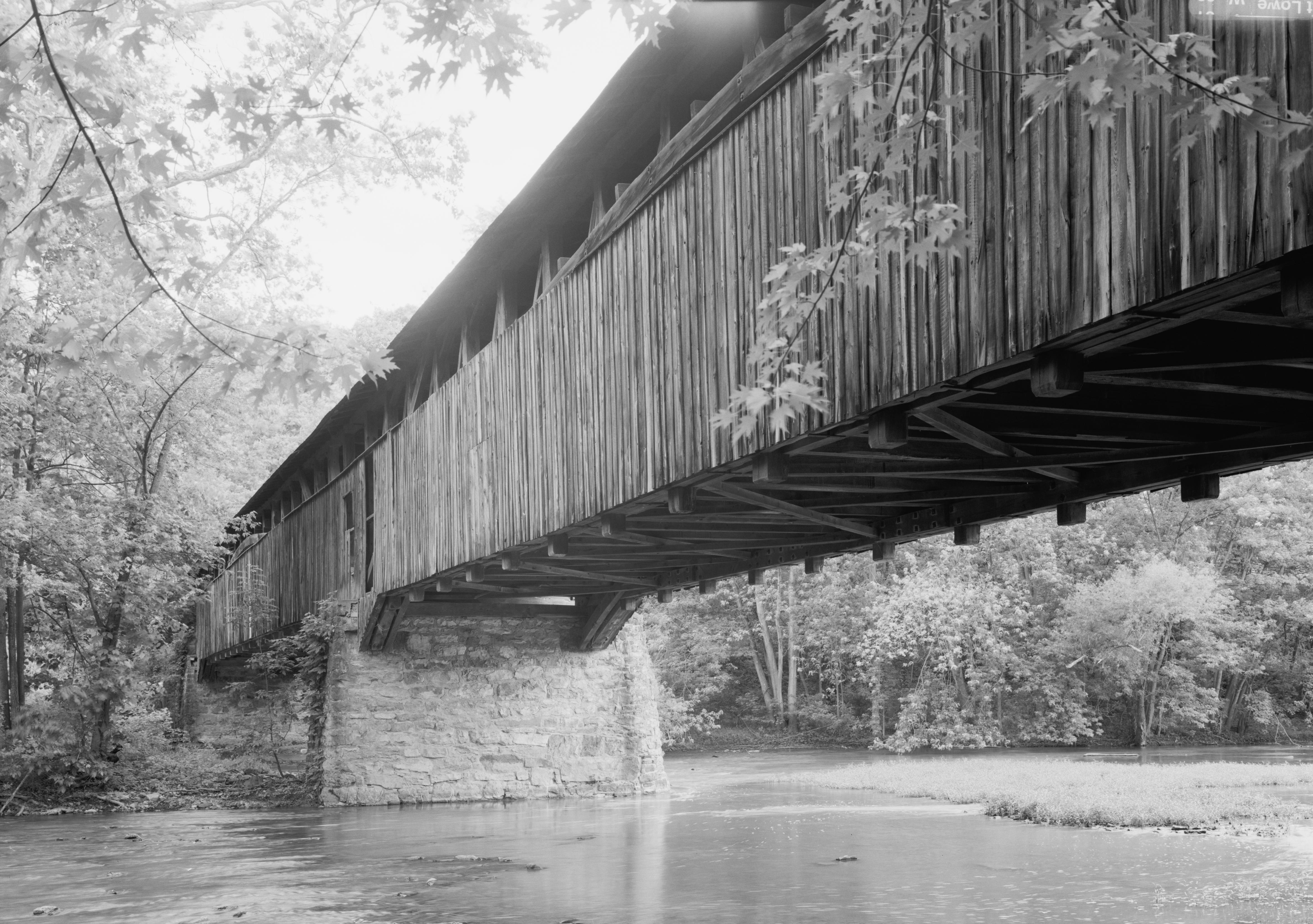
- Academia Pomeroy Covered Bridge

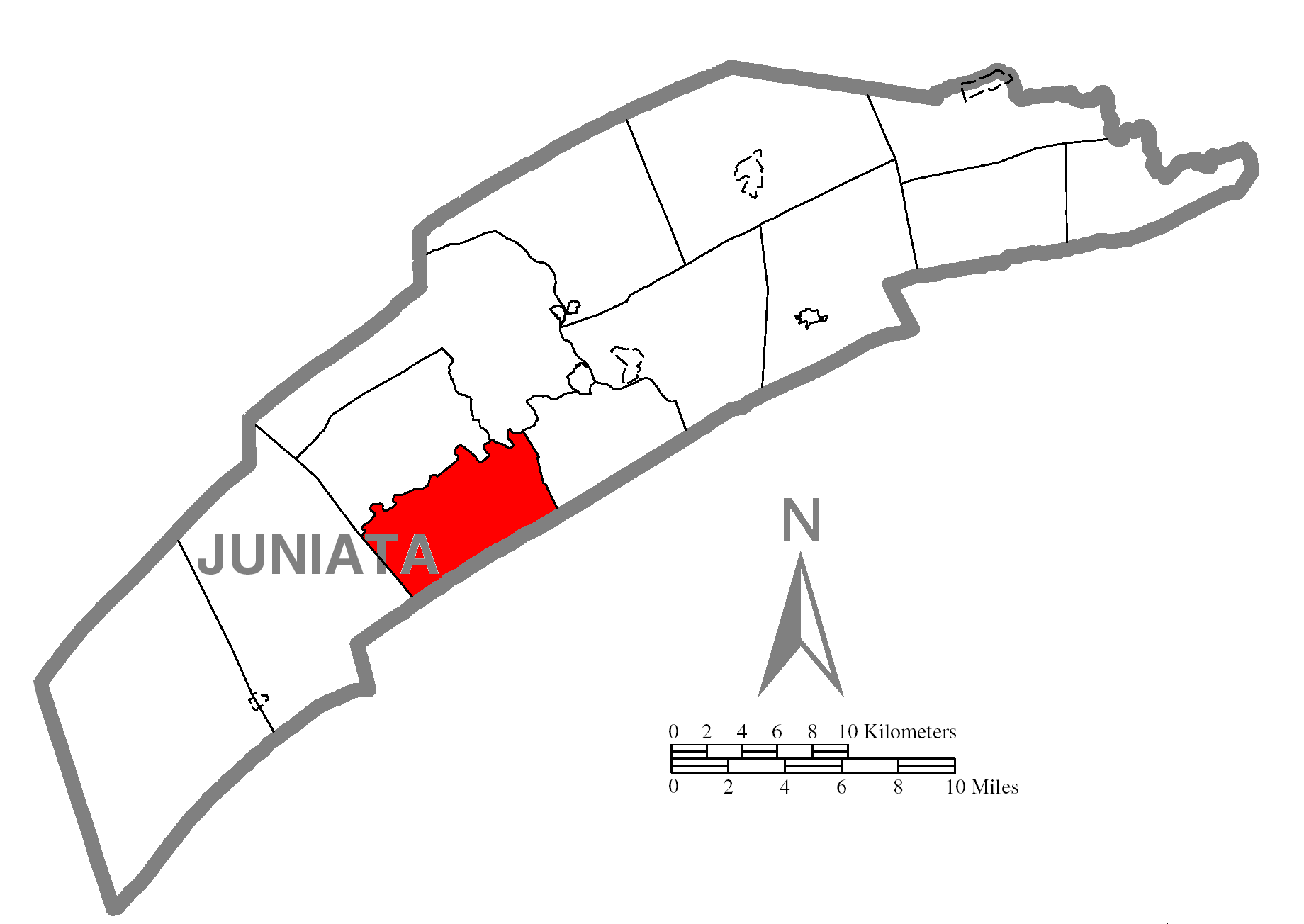
- Map of Juniata County, Pennsylvania highlighting Spruce Hill Township

- Map of Juniata County, Pennsylvania
- Country: United States
- State: Pennsylvania
- County: Juniata
- Settled: 1762
- Incorporated: 1858

Area
  - Total: 21.75 sq mi (56.34 km^{2})
  - Land: 21.75 sq mi (56.34 km^{2})
  - Water: 0 sq mi (0.00 km^{2})

Population (2020)
  - Total: 786 ▼
  - Estimate (2022): 778
  - Density: 40.0/sq mi (15.46/km^{2})
- Time zone: UTC-5 (EST)
  - Summer (DST): UTC-4 (EDT)
- Area code: 717
- FIPS code: 42-067-73504

Spruce Hill Township is a township in Juniata County, Pennsylvania, United States. The population was 786 at the 2020 census, a decline from the figure of 834 tabulated in 2010.

== History ==
The Academia Pomeroy Covered Bridge was listed on the National Register of Historic Places in 1979.

== Geography ==
The township is in south-central Juniata County. According to the United States Census Bureau, it has a total area of 21.7 square miles (56.3 km^{2}), all land. The crest of Tuscarora Mountain forms the southern border of the township. Tuscarora Creek, a northeastward-flowing tributary of the Juniata River, forms most of the northern border.

Spruce Hill Township is bordered by Beale and Milford Townships to the north, Turbett Township to the east, Perry County to the south and Tuscarora Township to the west. Unincorporated communities in the township include Spruce Hill, Seven Pines, and Path.

Pennsylvania Route 75 crosses the center of the township, leading northeast to Port Royal and southwest to East Waterford.

== Demographics ==
Historical population
| Census | Pop. | Note | %± |
|---|---|---|---|
| 1860 | 877 | | — |
| 1870 | 899 | | 2.5% |
| 1880 | 1,007 | | 12.0% |
| 1890 | 935 | | −7.1% |
| 1900 | 782 | | −16.4% |
| 1910 | 728 | | −6.9% |
| 1920 | 686 | | −5.8% |
| 1930 | 583 | | −15.0% |
| 1940 | 644 | | 10.5% |
| 1950 | 540 | | −16.1% |
| 1960 | 594 | | 10.0% |
| 1970 | 572 | | −3.7% |
| 1980 | 618 | | 8.0% |
| 1990 | 694 | | 12.3% |
| 2000 | 724 | | 4.3% |
| 2010 | 834 | | 15.2% |
| 2020 | 786 | | −5.8% |
| 2022 (est.) | 778 | | −1.0% |
U.S. Decennial Census

As of the census of 2000, there were 724 people, 271 households, and 199 families residing in the township. The population density was 33.4 inhabitants per square mile (12.9/km^{2}). There were 335 housing units at an average density of 15.5/sq mi (6.0/km^{2}). The racial makeup of the township was 96.41% White, 1.93% African American, 0.28% Native American, 0.55% from other races, and 0.83% from two or more races. Hispanic or Latino of any race were 1.80% of the population.

There were 271 households, out of which 36.5% had children under the age of 18 living with them, 62.7% were married couples living together, 5.2% had a female householder with no husband present, and 26.2% were non-families. 20.3% of all households were made up of individuals, and 8.9% had someone living alone who was 65 years of age or older. The average household size was 2.61 and the average family size was 3.06.

In the township the population was spread out, with 25.3% under the age of 18, 7.9% from 18 to 24, 28.0% from 25 to 44, 26.8% from 45 to 64, and 12.0% who were 65 years of age or older. The median age was 38 years. For every 100 females there were 108.0 males. For every 100 females age 18 and over, there were 108.1 males.

The median income for a household in the township was $35,962, and the median income for a family was $40,547. Males had a median income of $33,929 versus $20,278 for females. The per capita income for the township was $15,135. About 4.9% of families and 9.7% of the population were below the poverty line, including 8.2% of those under age 18 and 5.5% of those age 65 or over.
