= Tuscarora Creek =

Tuscarora Creek may refer to the following streams in the United States:

- Tuscarora Creek (Monocacy River tributary), Maryland
- Tuscarora Creek (Potomac River tributary), Maryland
- Tuscarora Creek (New York), a tributary of the Chemung River
- Tuscarora Creek (Juniata River tributary), Pennsylvania
- Tuscarora Creek (Susquehanna River tributary), a tributary of Susquehanna River, Pennsylvania
- Tuscarora Creek (Goose Creek), a tributary of Goose Creek (Potomac River tributary), Virginia
- Tuscarora Creek (Opequon Creek tributary), West Virginia
