= Mifflin County School District =

Public school district in Pennsylvania, United States

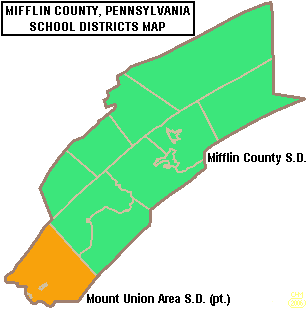
- "Educate each student to meet life's challenges."

Address
- 201 Eighth Street Lewistown, Mifflin County, Pennsylvania, 17044; United States

District information
- Type: Public
- Established: 1966

Students and staff
- District mascot: Huskies
- Colors: Purple, Black, and silver

Other information
- Website: mcsdk12.org

The Mifflin County School District is a midsized, rural public school district located in the Commonwealth of Pennsylvania. The district boundaries coincide with the boundaries of Mifflin County, minus the southwestern municipalities of Kistler and Newton Hamilton boroughs and Wayne Township, which are part of the Mount Union Area School District. Mifflin County School District encompasses approximately 362.3 square miles. According to 2010 federal census data, it served a resident population of 43,607. Based on 2020 federal census data, the district's resident population shrank to 43,285. The educational attainment levels for the Mifflin County School District population (25 years old and over) were 81.4% high school graduates and 11.1% college graduates.

According to the Pennsylvania Budget and Policy Center, 48.9% of the District's pupils lived at 185% or below the Federal Poverty level as shown by their eligibility for the federal free or reduced price school meal programs in 2012. In 2009, the district residents’ per capita income was $15,612, while the median family income was $38,723. In the Commonwealth, the median family income was $49,501 and the United States median family income was $49,445, in 2010. In Mifflin County the median household income was $37,539. By 2013, the median household income in the United States rose to $52,100.

According to District officials, in the 2013-2014 school year, Mifflin County School District provided basic educational services to 5,436 pupils through the employment of 400 administrators and teachers and 214 full-time and part-time non-instructional staff. The superintendent is Vance Varner. In 2011-12, the District provided basic educational services to 5,336 pupils. It reported employing: 384 teachers, 229 full-time and part-time support personnel, and increasing to 30 administrators. The District received $30.9 million in state funding in the 2011-12 school year. In school year 2007-08, the MCSD enrollment was 5,691 pupils. In 2008, the District employed: 460 teachers, 402 full-time and part-time support personnel, and 27 administrators. Mifflin County School District received more than $28.7 million in state funding in school year 2007-08.

Due to decreasing enrollment, rising operating costs, and aging facilities that required significant upgrades, on January 13, 2011, the Mifflin County School Board approved a consolidation plan to combine the high schools and reduce the total schools in the district from 15 to 10. These changes went into effect during the 2011-2012 academic year.

Mifflin County School District consists of 5 elementary schools, 2 intermediate,1 middle school,1 junior highschool, and 1 high schools and a distance learning program for grades 6 through 12. High school students may choose to attend The Mifflin County Academy of Science and Technology, formerly known as Mifflin-Juniata Career and Technology Center for training in the construction and mechanical trades. The Tuscarora Intermediate Unit 11 provides the district with a wide variety of services like specialized education for disabled students and hearing, speech and visual disability services and professional development for staff and faculty.

== School Board ==
The following are the current members of the Mifflin County School District Board of Directors.

- Zeb I. Harshbarger, President
- Brent A. Erb, Vice President
- Mark R. Baker
- Erin N. Barlup
- Jessica E. Baumgardner
- Paula R. Dickson
- R. Brian Ketchem
- E. Terry Styers
- Cody L. Wian

(As of December 2025)

== Schools ==
In 2010, the Mifflin County School Board voted to reduce 15 schools to 10. The high schools saw the first change. 10th through 12th graders at Indian Valley High and Lewistown Area High were placed at the new Mifflin County High School for the 2011-12 school year. Five schools were closed and the former Indian Valley and Lewistown Middle Schools were retrofitted to serve students in grades 4-5. However, Indian Valley serves students in grades K-5, due to its size.

The following schools are in the district:

- East Derry Elementary School (K–3), 2316 Back Maitland Road, Lewistown, Pennsylvania
- Indian Valley Elementary and Intermediate Center (K–5), 125 Kish Road, Reedsville, Pennsylvania
- Lewistown Elementary School(K–3), 1 Manor Drive, Lewistown
- Strodes Mills Elementary School (K–3), 185 Chestnut Ridge Road, McVeytown
- Lewistown Intermediate School (grades 4–5), 212 Green Avenue, Lewistown
- Mifflin County Middle School (grades 6–7), 2 Manor Drive, Lewistown
- Mifflin County Junior High School (grades 8–9), 700 Cedar Street, Lewistown, former Indian Valle High School building
- Mifflin County High School, (grades 10–12), 501 Sixth Street, Lewistown

== Closed schools ==
In June 2011, the district faced a major budget shortfall. As a result, the Administration and School Board embraced a plan to realign the use of buildings and reconfigure several schools. Students were assigned to other schools within the district.

Armagh Elementary School - Mascot: Armadillo
283 Broad St. Ext., Milroy, Pennsylvania 17063. Armagh Elementary school was built in 1962. At that time it housed grades one through six. Grade six moved when Indian Valley Middle School was started in 1987. The school originally was part of the Kishacoquillas School District. It became a part of the Mifflin County School District when it was formed in 1966. With an enrollment of 203 students, it was closed June 2011.

Brown Elementary School - Mascot: Bear
96 Kish Rd., Reedsville, Pennsylvania 17084. Brown Elementary was constructed in 1962 and was opened for students in 1963 for grades 1 through 6. Kindergarten classes started later and were held in the old school until it was finally torn down in the 1970s. With an enrollment of 155 students, it was closed June 2011.

Buchanan Elementary School - Mascot: Bulldog.
100 Franklin Ave., Lewistown, Pennsylvania 17044. Buchanan Elementary School opened in 1951 as an elementary facility and had continued in that capacity. With an enrollment of 276 students, it was closed June 2011.

Derry Elementary School - Mascot: Dolphin.
200 Greenwood Ave., Yeagertown, Pennsylvania 17099. Formerly Derry High School. Closed in June 2005 (Merged with Seventh Ward and Buchanan to form Lewistown Elementary School).

Highland Park Area Elementary School - Mascot: Penguin.
490 Sixth St., Lewistown, Pennsylvania 17044. Opened originally in 1978 as Chief Logan Middle School. In 1989, it became an elementary facility as a result of district reorganization. With an enrollment of 516 students, it was closed June 2011.

Strodes Mills Middle School - Mascot: Panther
205 Chestnut Ridge Road, McVeytown, PA 17051. Strodes Mills Middle School opened in 1978. The school consists of grades 6 through 8, however, all of grade 5 and one section of grade 4 was housed at Strodes Mills Middle School. With an enrollment of 395 students, it was closed June 2011

Kishacoquillas Junior/Senior High School - Mascot: Indian
closed June 1988
