= East Juniata Junior/Senior High School =

Public high school in McAlisterville, Pennsylvania

Coordinates: 40.65822°N 77.21695°W

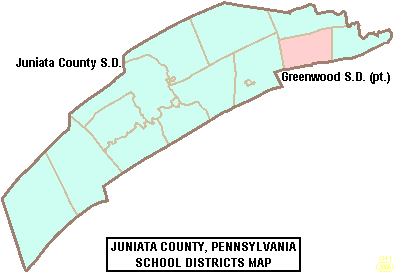

Location
- 32944 Route 35; Fayette Township, Juaniata County, Pennsylvania; McAlisterville, Juniata County, Pennsylvania 17049; United States

Information
- School type: Public Junior/Senior High School
- School district: Juniata County School District
- School code: NCES: 421260002394
- Principal: Michael McClay
- Staff: 33.20 (FTE)
- Grades: 7–12
- Enrollment: 366 (2023–2024)
- Student to teacher ratio: 11.02
- Colors: Maroon and Gray
- Athletics conference: PIAA District IV / Tri-Valley Conference
- Team name: Tigers
- Rival: Juniata High School
- Communities served: McAlisterville, Richfield, Thompsontown
- Feeder schools: East Juniata Elementary School
- Website: https://ejhs.jcsdk12.org/o/ejhs

East Juniata Junior/Senior High School is a diminutive, rural, combined middle school and high school in Fayette Township, Juaniata County, Pennsylvania, United States. It is one of two secondary campuses in the Juniata County School District. The school is located along Route 35 in Fayette Township. In the 2016–2017 school year, the school reported an enrollment of 514 pupils in grades 7th through 12th.

== Extracurriculars ==
The Juniata County School District offers a wide variety of clubs, activities and sports at East Juniata Junior Senior High School.

=== Athletics ===
The following athletics are available at East Juniata. EJ participates in PIAA District IV and is part of the Tri-Valley League:

- Baseball
- Soccer
- Basketball
- Field Hockey
- Football
- Golf
- Softball
- Track and Field
- Wrestling

== Notable alumni ==
=== Athletics ===
- Ethan Roe - Decorated decathlete for Susquehanna University track and field
- Rowan Smith - Decorated decathlete for Susquehanna University track and field
