= East Waterford, Pennsylvania =

Unincorporated community in Pennsylvania, US

- Census-designated place
- Location within Pennsylvania Location within the United States
- Coordinates: 40°22′14″N 77°36′15″W
- Country: United States
- State: Pennsylvania
- County: Juniata
- Townships: Tuscarora, Lack

Area
  - Total: 0.37 sq mi (0.97 km^{2})
  - Land: 0.37 sq mi (0.97 km^{2})
  - Water: 0 sq mi (0.00 km^{2})
- Elevation: 627 ft (191 m)

Population (2020)
  - Total: 156
  - Density: 415.3/sq mi (160.34/km^{2})
- Time zone: UTC-5 (Eastern (EST))
  - Summer (DST): UTC-4 (EDT)
- ZIP code: 17021
- Area codes: 717 and 223
- FIPS code: 42-22024

East Waterford is a census-designated place (CDP) in Tuscarora and Lack townships in Juniata County, Pennsylvania, United States. The population was 196 at the 2010 census.

== Geography ==
East Waterford is located in southwestern Juniata County at 40°22′14″N 77°36′15″W (40.370461, -77.604214). Most of the community is in the southwestern corner of Tuscarora Township, but the CDP extends west into the eastern part of Lack Township.

Pennsylvania Route 75 passes through the center of East Waterford, leading northeast 17 miles (27 km) to Port Royal and southwest 13 miles (21 km) to Doylesburg.

According to the United States Census Bureau, the East Waterford CDP has a total area of 0.37 square miles (0.97 km^{2}), all land. Tuscarora Creek, a northeastward-flowing tributary of the Juniata River, forms the northern edge of the CDP.

== Demographics ==
Historical population
Census	Pop.	Note	%±
2020	156		—
U.S. Decennial Census

As of the census of 2000, there were 185 people, 78 households, and 52 families residing in the CDP. The population density was 811.8 inhabitants per square mile (313.4/km^{2}). There were 88 housing units at an average density of 386.1 units per square mile (149.1 units/km^{2}). The racial makeup of the CDP was 99.46% White and 0.54% Asian. Hispanic or Latino of any race were 2.16% of the population.

There were 78 households, out of which 29.5% had children under the age of 18 living with them, 51.3% were married couples living together, 6.4% had a female householder with no husband present, and 33.3% were non-families. 29.5% of all households were made up of individuals, and 12.8% had someone living alone who was 65 years of age or older. The average household size was 2.37 and the average family size was 2.87.

In the CDP the population was spread out, with 22.7% under the age of 18, 10.3% from 18 to 24, 25.9% from 25 to 44, 26.5% from 45 to 64, and 14.6% who were 65 years of age or older. The median age was 42 years. For every 100 females there were 88.8 males. For every 100 females age 18 and over, there were 104.3 males.

The median income for a household in the CDP was $28,333, and the median income for a family was $37,750. Males had a median income of $27,500 versus $26,750 for females. The per capita income for the CDP was $13,456. About 9.4% of families and 16.3% of the population were below the poverty line, including 14.3% of those under the age of eighteen and 11.5% of those sixty five or over.
