= Tuscarora Township, Perry County, Pennsylvania =

Township in Pennsylvania, US

Coordinates: 40°31′00″N 77°11′59″W

- Township
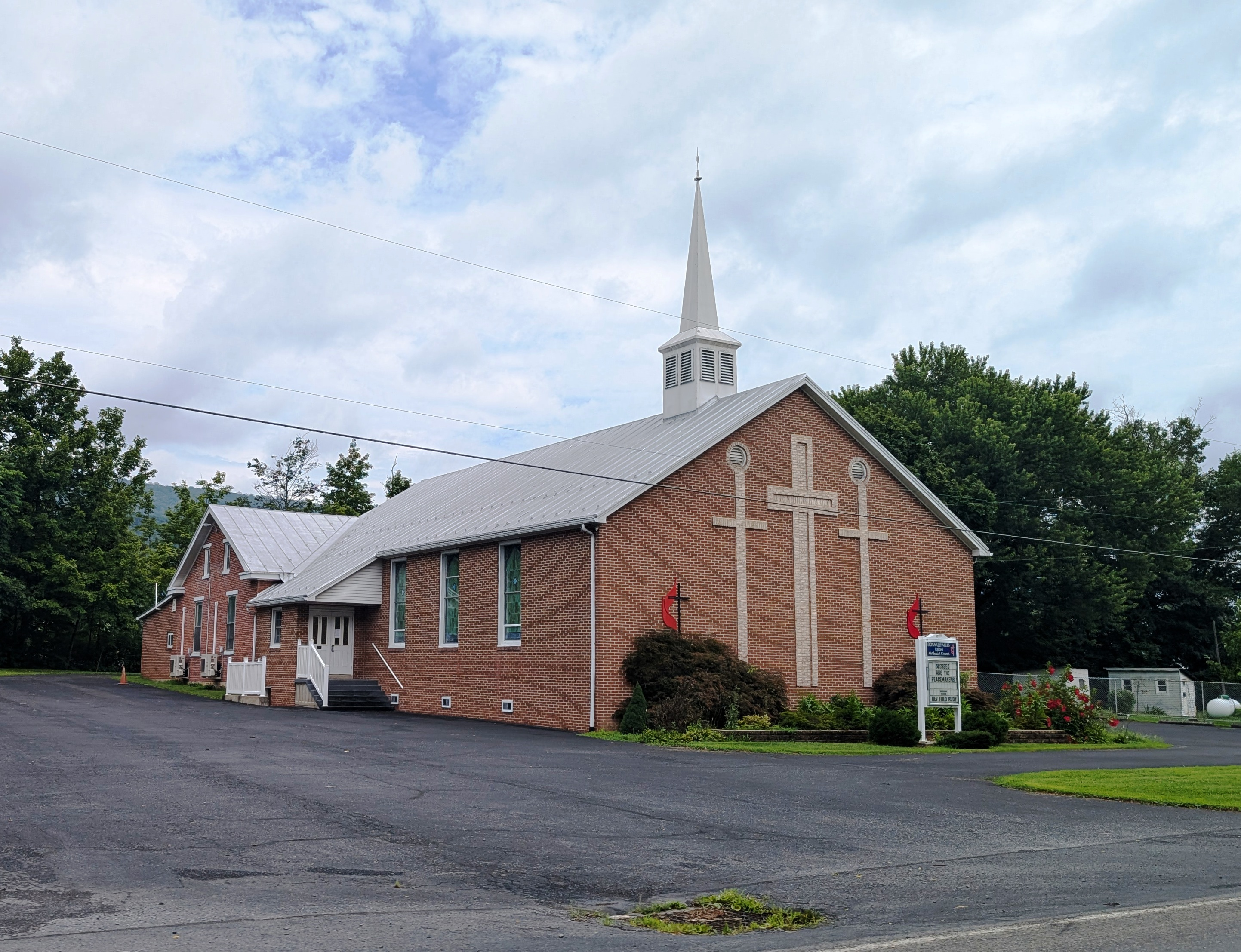
- Donnally Mills United Methodist Church

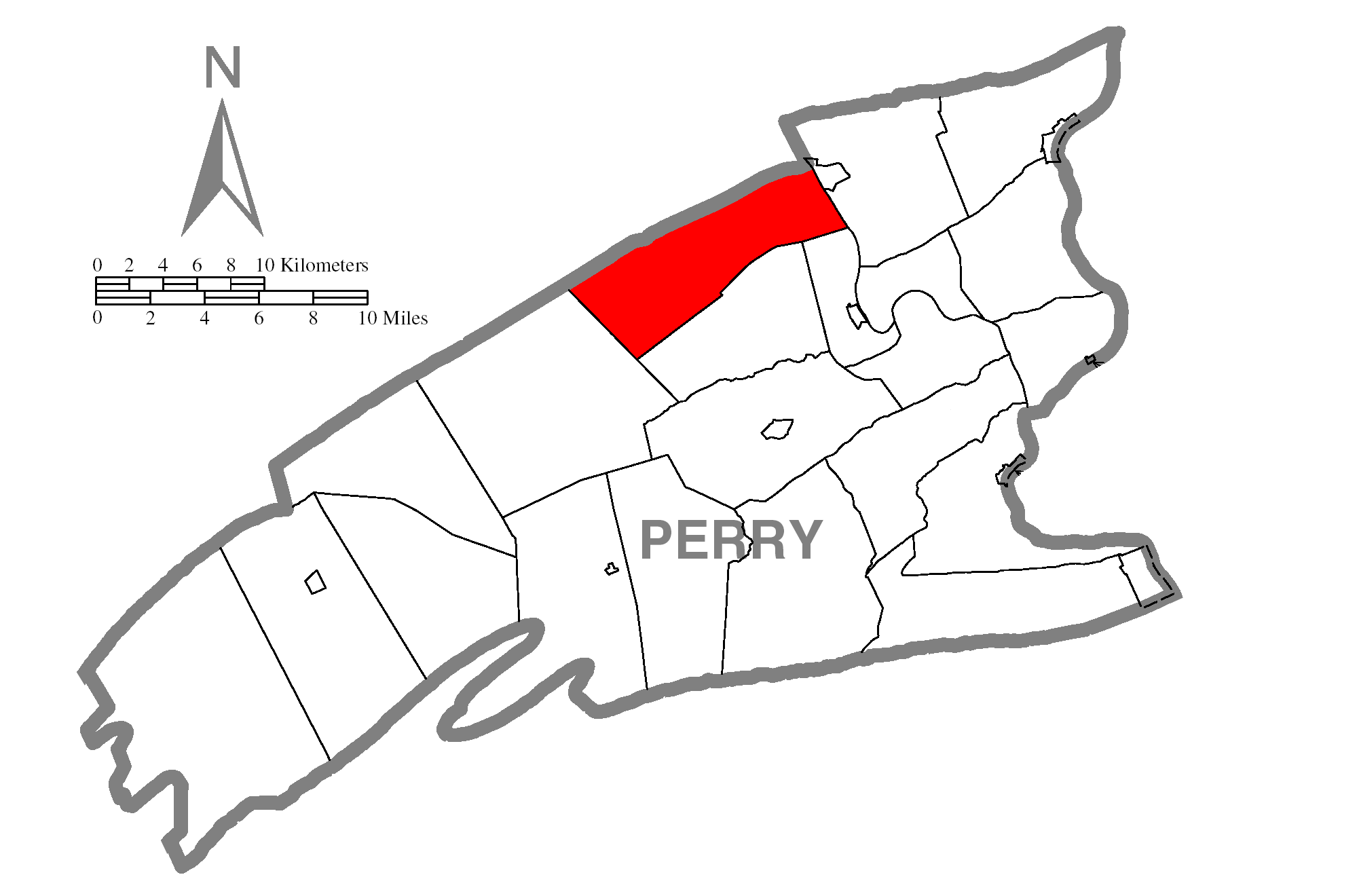
- Map of Perry County, Pennsylvania highlighting Tuscarora Township

- Map of Perry County, Pennsylvania
- Country: United States
- State: Pennsylvania
- County: Perry
- Settled: 1766
- Incorporated: 1859

Area
  - Total: 29.53 sq mi (76.48 km^{2})
  - Land: 29.32 sq mi (75.95 km^{2})
  - Water: 0.20 sq mi (0.53 km^{2})

Population (2020)
  - Total: 1,310 ▲
  - Estimate (2023): 1,321
  - Density: 40.6/sq mi (15.67/km^{2})
- Time zone: UTC-5 (Eastern (EST))
  - Summer (DST): UTC-4 (EDT)
- Area code: 717
- FIPS code: 42-099-77960
- Website: https://tuscaroratownship.com/

Tuscarora Township is a township in Perry County, Pennsylvania, United States. The population was 1,310 at the 2020 census.

== Geography ==
According to the United States Census Bureau, the township has a total area of 29.5 square miles (76.5 km^{2}), of which 29.4 square miles (76.1 km^{2}) is land and 0.1 square mile (0.4 km^{2}) (0.47%) is water.

== Demographics ==
Historical population
Census	Pop.	Note	%±
2010	1,189		—
2020	1,310		10.2%
2023 (est.)	1,321		0.8%
U.S. Decennial Census

As of the census of 2000, there were 1,122 people, 419 households, and 318 families residing in the township. The population density was 38.2 inhabitants per square mile (14.7/km^{2}). There were 539 housing units at an average density of 18.3/sq mi (7.1/km^{2}). The racial makeup of the township was 97.15% White, 1.25% African American, 0.36% Native American, 0.27% Asian, 0.18% from other races, and 0.80% from two or more races. Hispanic or Latino of any race were 0.89% of the population.

There were 419 households, out of which 33.2% had children under the age of 18 living with them, 66.1% were married couples living together, 5.7% had a female householder with no husband present, and 24.1% were non-families. 20.0% of all households were made up of individuals, and 9.3% had someone living alone who was 65 years of age or older. The average household size was 2.63 and the average family size was 3.05.

In the township the population was spread out, with 26.3% under the age of 18, 6.1% from 18 to 24, 29.1% from 25 to 44, 25.6% from 45 to 64, and 12.9% who were 65 years of age or older. The median age was 38 years. For every 100 females, there were 104.0 males. For every 100 females age 18 and over, there were 103.2 males.

The median income for a household in the township was $40,813, and the median income for a family was $46,447. Males had a median income of $37,688 versus $21,765 for females. The per capita income for the township was $16,951. About 5.6% of families and 8.9% of the population were below the poverty line, including 15.1% of those under age 18 and 3.7% of those age 65 or over.
