= Tuscarora Township, Bradford County, Pennsylvania =

Township in Pennsylvania, US

Coordinates: 41°42′30″N 76°07′27″W

- Township
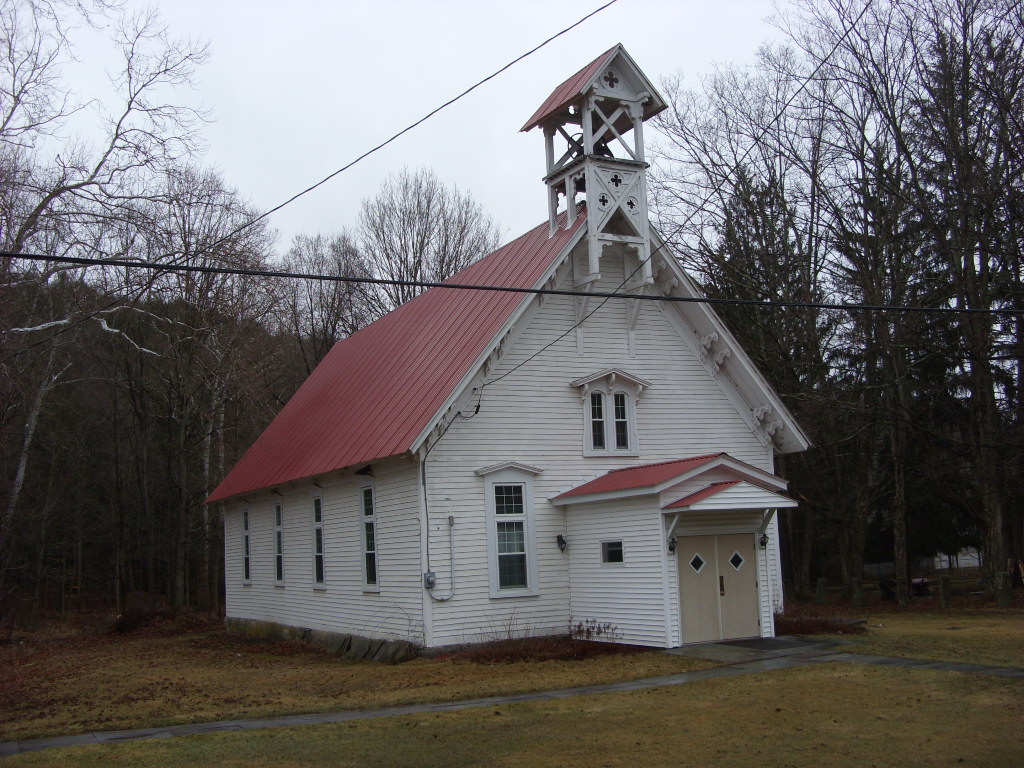
- Silvara Community Church

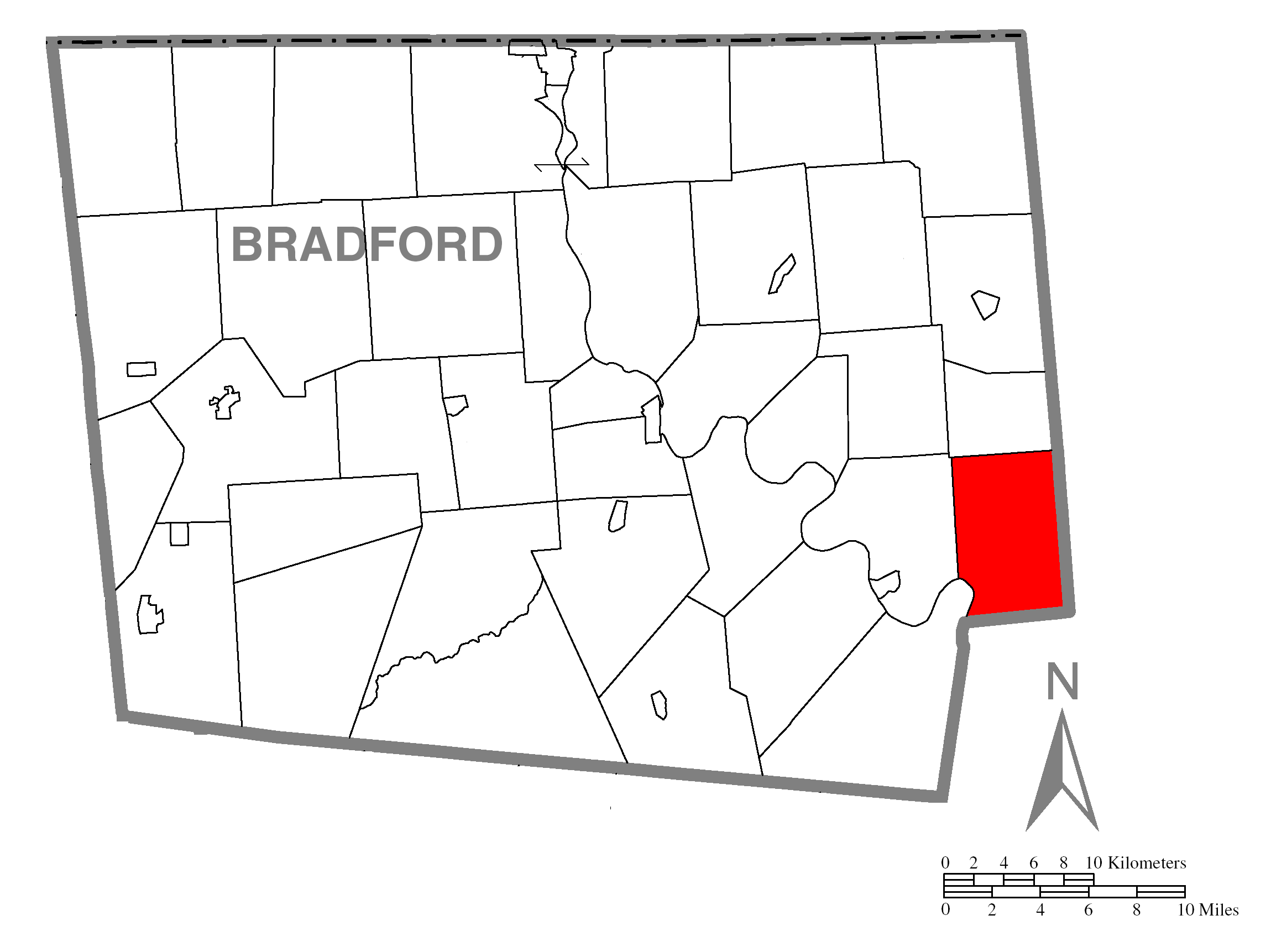
- Map of Bradford County with Tuscarora Township highlighted

- Map of Bradford County, Pennsylvania
- Country: United States
- State: Pennsylvania
- County: Bradford
- Settled: 1775
- Incorporated: 1830

Area
  - Total: 29.54 sq mi (76.52 km^{2})
  - Land: 29.03 sq mi (75.18 km^{2})
  - Water: 0.52 sq mi (1.35 km^{2})

Population (2010)
  - Total: 1,131
  - Estimate (2016): 1,106
  - Density: 38.1/sq mi (14.71/km^{2})
- Area code: 570
- FIPS code: 42-015-77936

Tuscarora Township is a township in Bradford County, Pennsylvania and is part of Northeastern Pennsylvania. Its population was 1,131 at the 2010 census.

== Geography ==
Tuscarora Township is located in the south-eastern corner of Bradford County. It is bordered by Stevens Township to the north, Wyalusing Township to the west, and Wilmot Township to the southwest, across the Susquehanna River. Braintrim Township and the borough of Laceyville in Wyoming County are to the south, and Auburn and Rush townships in Susquehanna County are to the east. Tuscarora Township includes the unincorporated communities of Silvara, Spring Hill and Edinger Hill (formerly South Spring Hill).

U.S. Route 6 travels through the southwestern part of the township on high ground above the Susquehanna River.

According to the United States Census Bureau, the township has a total area of 29.5 square miles (76.5 km^{2}), of which 29.0 square miles (75.2 km^{2}) is land and 0.50 square miles (1.3 km^{2}), or 1.76%, is water.

== Demographic ==
Historical population
Census	Pop.	Note	%±
2010	1,131		—
2016 (est.)	1,106		−2.2%
U.S. Decennial Census

As of the census of 2000, there were 1,072 people, 401 households, and 305 families residing in the township. The population density was 36.6 inhabitants per square mile (14.1/km^{2}). There were 473 housing units at an average density of 16.1/sq mi (6.2/km^{2}). The racial makeup of the township was 99.07% White, 0.09% African American, 0.09% Native American, 0.19% Asian, 0.19% from other races, and 0.37% from two or more races. Hispanic or Latino of any race were 0.19% of the population.

There were 401 households, out of which 35.2% had children under the age of 18 living with them, 64.8% were married couples living together, 5.5% had a female householder with no husband present, and 23.9% were non-families. 19.2% of all households were made up of individuals, and 9.5% had someone living alone who was 65 years of age or older. The average household size was 2.67 and the average family size was 3.02.

In the township the population was spread out, with 25.7% under the age of 18, 7.1% from 18 to 24, 27.0% from 25 to 44, 25.5% from 45 to 64, and 14.7% who were 65 years of age or older. The median age was 39 years. For every 100 females, there were 97.1 males. For every 100 females age 18 and over, there were 95.1 males.

The median income for a household in the township was $32,163, and the median income for a family was $35,069. Males had a median income of $30,000 versus $21,750 for females. The per capita income for the township was $14,798. About 9.4% of families and 13.6% of the population were below the poverty line, including 15.6% of those under age 18 and 11.9% of those age 65 or over.
