= Mifflin, Pennsylvania =

Borough in Pennsylvania, US

- Borough
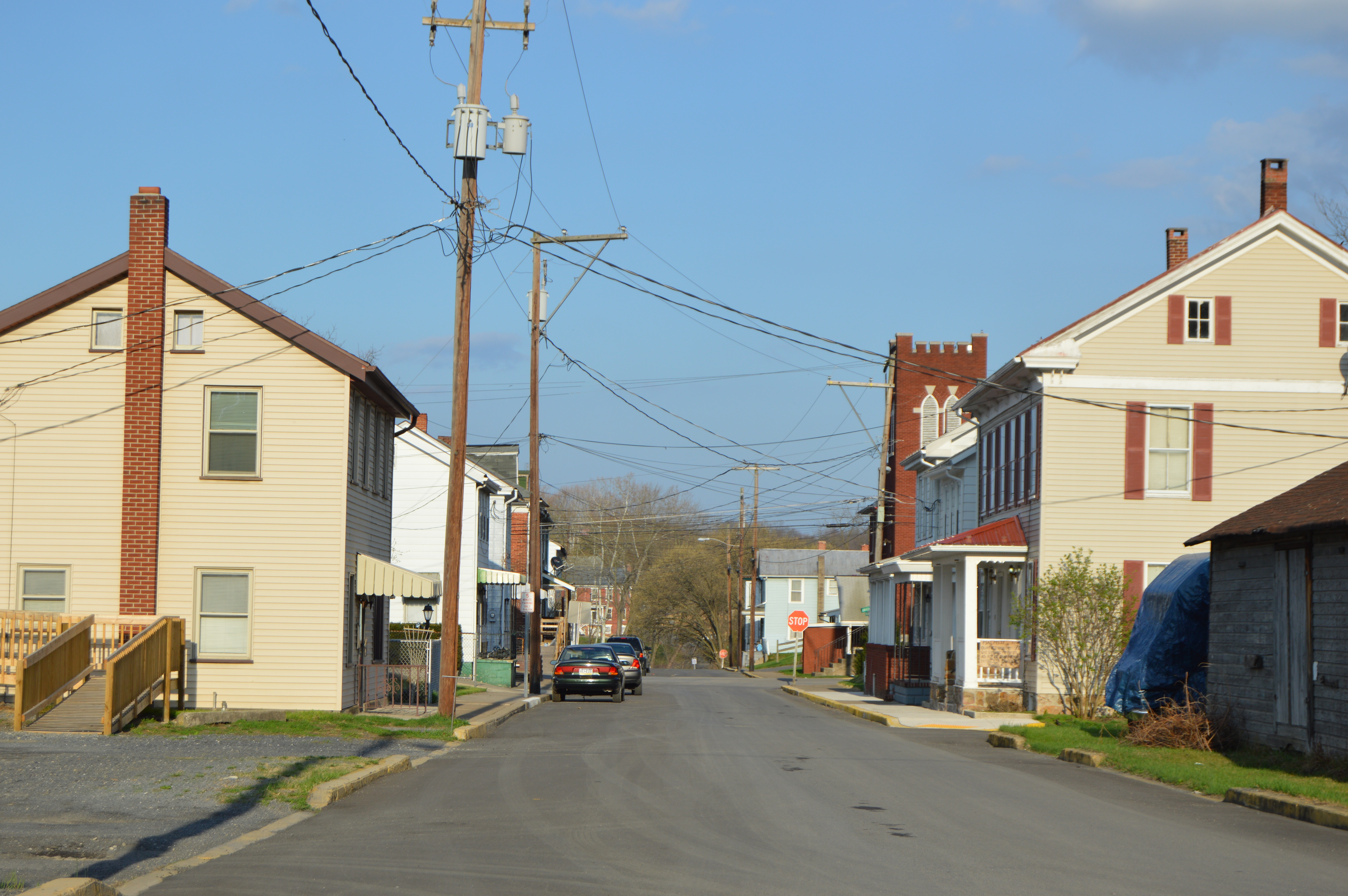
- Tuscarora Street

- Location of Mifflin in Juniata County, Pennsylvania.

- Location within Pennsylvania Location within the United States
- Coordinates: 40°34′06″N 77°24′13″W
- Country: United States
- State: Pennsylvania
- County: Juniata
- Settled: 1849
- Incorporated: 1853

Area
  - Total: 0.17 sq mi (0.45 km^{2})
  - Land: 0.17 sq mi (0.45 km^{2})
  - Water: 0 sq mi (0.00 km^{2})
- Elevation (church at center of borough): 456 ft (139 m)
- Highest elevation (western borough boundary): 580 ft (180 m)
- Lowest elevation (Juniata River): 418 ft (127 m)

Population (2020)
  - Total: 530
  - Density: 3,041.8/sq mi (1,174.45/km^{2})
- Time zone: UTC-5 (Eastern (EST))
  - Summer (DST): UTC-4 (EDT)
- Zip code: 17058
- Area code: 717
- FIPS code: 42-49272
- Website: https://mifflinborough.org/

Mifflin is a borough in Juniata County, Pennsylvania, United States. The population was 534 at the 2020 census.

== History ==
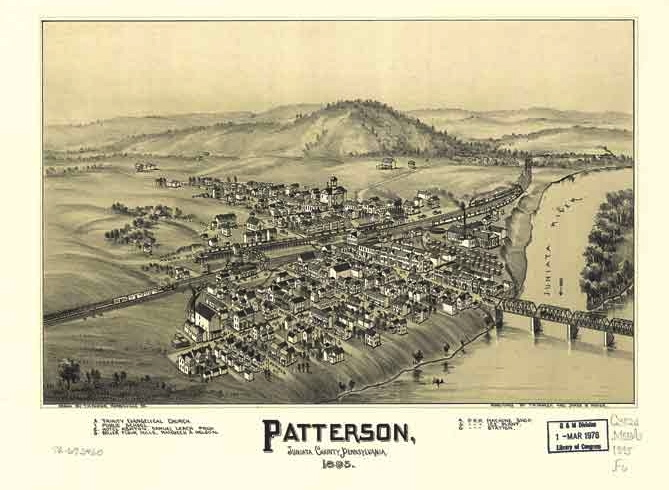
1895 bird's-eye-view of Mifflin, then known as Patterson

Mifflin was founded as the town of Patterson. At one time, Mifflin, as well as the small community of Denholm lying directly north of the town, was an important stop along the Pennsylvania Railroad. The railroad tracks still pass through the town, but they are now owned by the Norfolk Southern Railway.

The Pennsylvania Railroad depot still stands in Mifflin, although it has long been abandoned. Mifflin is named after Thomas Mifflin, the first Governor of Pennsylvania.

== Geography ==
Mifflin is located at 40°34′6″N 77°24′13″W (40.568262, -77.403496).

According to the United States Census Bureau, the borough has a total area of 0.2 square miles (0.52 km^{2}), all land.

== Demographics ==
Historical population
Census	Pop.	Note	%±
1910	885		—
1920	965		9.0%
1930	913		−5.4%
1940	860		−5.8%
1950	835		−2.9%
1960	745		−10.8%
1970	640		−14.1%
1980	648		1.3%
1990	660		1.9%
2000	627		−5.0%
2010	642		2.4%
2020	530		−17.4%
2021 (est.)	527	▼	−0.6%

As of the census of 2000, there were 627 people, 234 households, and 165 families residing in the borough. The population density was 3,506.9 inhabitants per square mile (1,354.0/km^{2}). There were 260 housing units at an average density of 1,454.2 per square mile (561.5/km^{2}). The racial makeup of the borough was 92.82% White, 1.28% Native American, 0.32% Asian, 0.32% Pacific Islander, 3.83% from other races, and 1.44% from two or more races. Hispanic or Latino of any race were 6.38% of the population.

There were 234 households, out of which 38.5% had children under the age of 18 living with them, 49.1% were married couples living together, 13.2% had a female householder with no husband present, and 29.1% were non-families. 23.5% of all households were made up of individuals, and 10.3% had someone living alone who was 65 years of age or older. The average household size was 2.66 and the average family size was 3.07.

In the borough the population was spread out, with 28.9% under the age of 18, 10.4% from 18 to 24, 30.9% from 25 to 44, 20.9% from 45 to 64, and 8.9% who were 65 years of age or older. The median age was 32 years. For every 100 females there were 97.8 males. For every 100 females age 18 and over, there were 96.5 males.

The median income for a household in the borough was $26,438, and the median income for a family was $28,750. Males had a median income of $27,386 versus $19,044 for females. The per capita income for the borough was $12,843. About 14.9% of families and 17.5% of the population were below the poverty line, including 27.0% of those under age 18 and 4.8% of those age 65 or over.
