= Tuscarora Township, Juniata County, Pennsylvania =

Township in Pennsylvania, US

Coordinates: 40°22′00″N 77°34′59″W

- Township
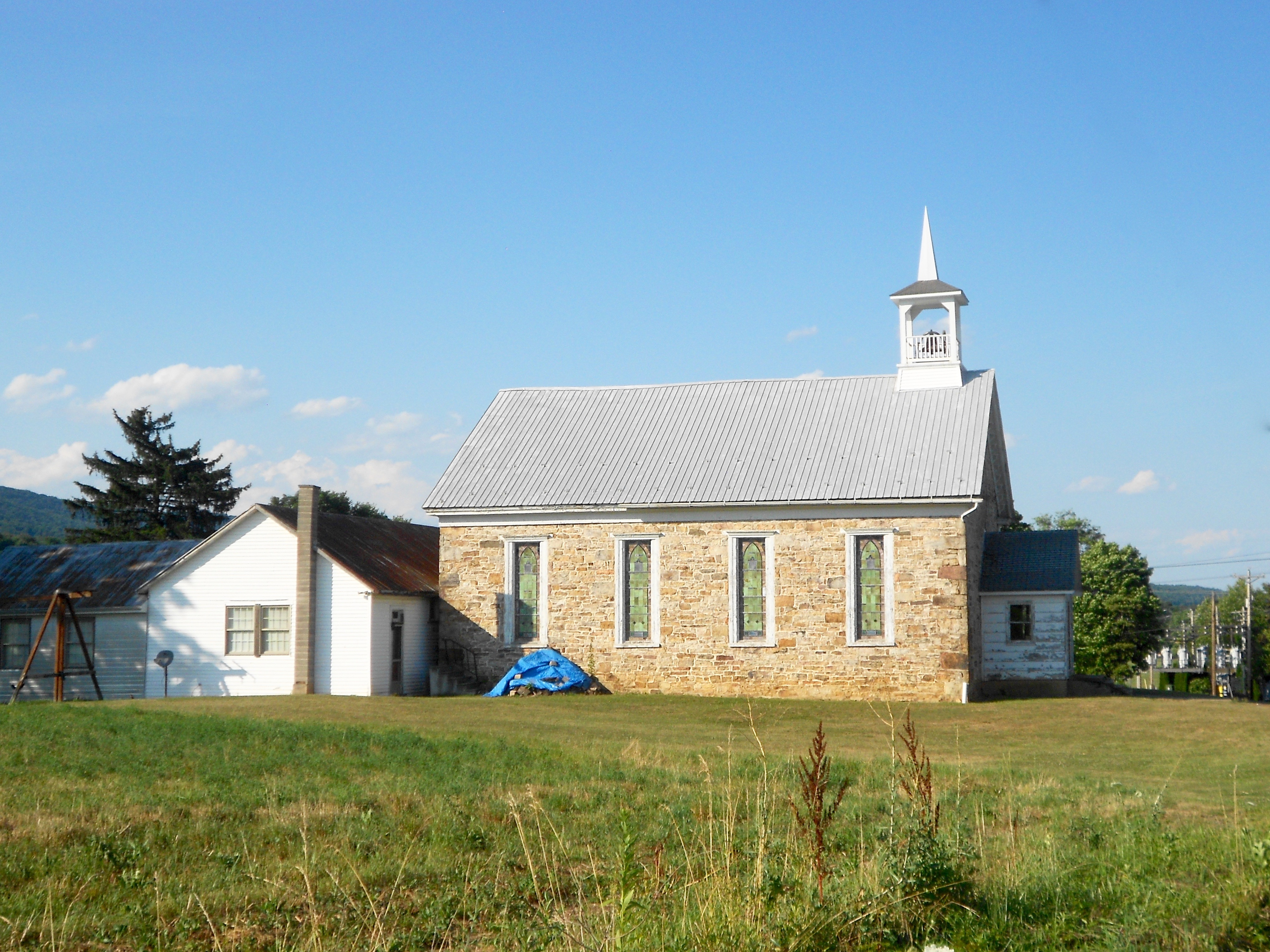
- Wesley Chapel, built 1867, in Reeds Gap

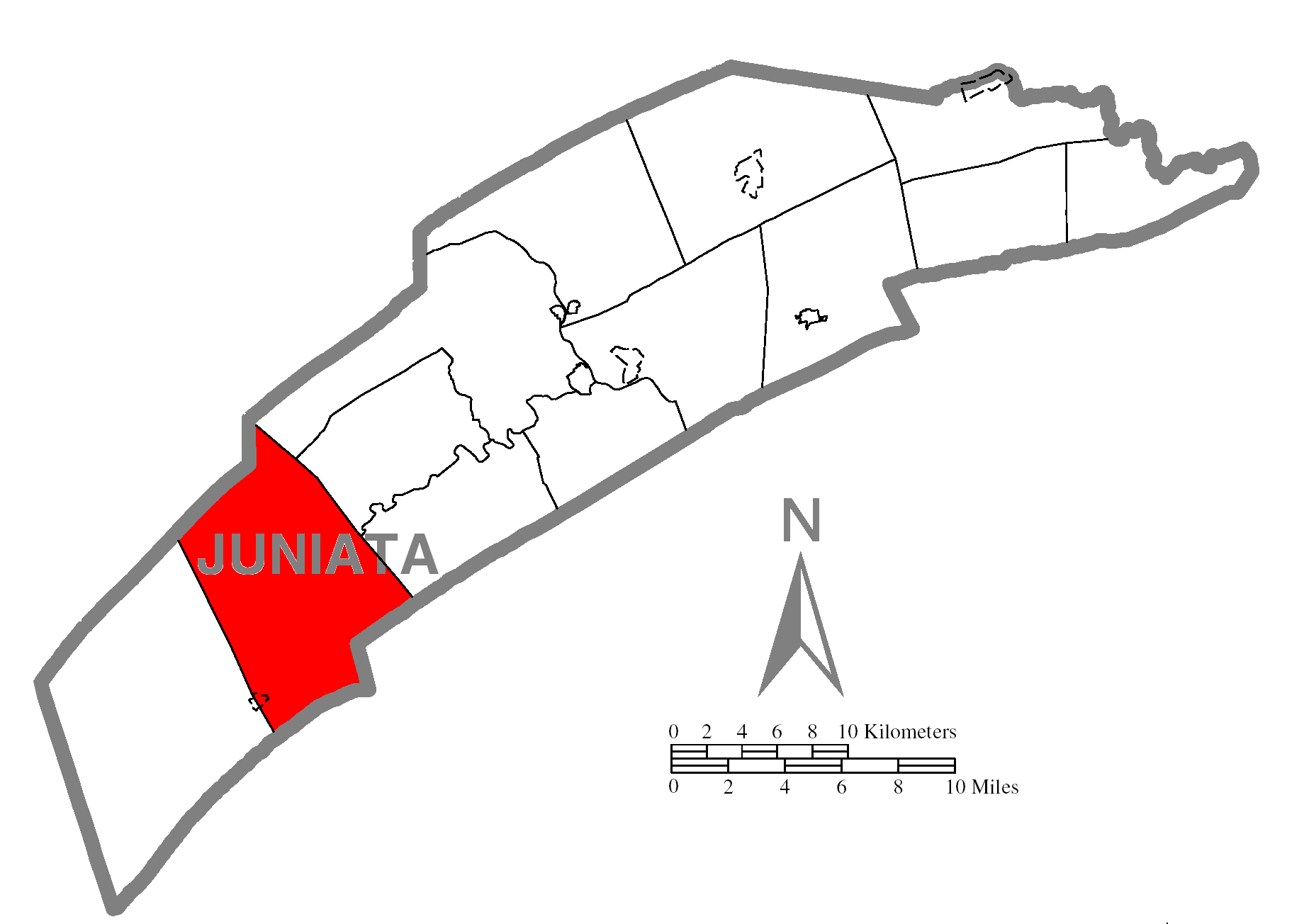
- Map of Juniata County, Pennsylvania highlighting Tuscarora Township

- Map of Juniata County, Pennsylvania
- Country: United States
- State: Pennsylvania
- County: Juniata
- Settled: 1767
- Incorporated: 1825

Government
  - Type: Board of Supervisors

Area
  - Total: 47.22 sq mi (122.29 km^{2})
  - Land: 47.21 sq mi (122.28 km^{2})
  - Water: 0 sq mi (0.00 km^{2})

Population (2020)
  - Total: 1,131 ▼
  - Estimate (2022): 1,128
  - Density: 26.4/sq mi (10.21/km^{2})
- Time zone: UTC-5 (EST)
  - Summer (DST): UTC-4 (EDT)
- Area code: 717
- FIPS code: 42-067-77952
- Website: www.tuscaroratownship.org

Tuscarora Township is a township that is located in southwestern Juniata County, Pennsylvania, United States. The population was 1,131 at the time of the 2020 census.

== Geography ==
According to the United States Census Bureau, the township has a total area of 47.2 square miles (122.3 km^{2}), of which 0.5 acres (1,972 m^{2}), or less than 0.01%, are water.

The township is located in the Ridge-and-Valley province of the Appalachian Mountains. Blacklog Mountain and Shade Mountain occupy the northern part of the township, a series of smaller ridges and valleys occupy the center, and Tuscarora Mountain forms the southern edge. Tuscarora Creek, a tributary of the Juniata River, flows from southwest to northeast through the center of the township.

Tuscarora Township is bordered by Mifflin County to the north, Milford, Beale and Spruce Hill Townships to the east, Perry County to the south, and Lack Township to the west.

The census-designated place of East Waterford is in the southeastern part of the county along Pennsylvania Route 75. Other unincorporated places in the township include Reeds Gap, McCoysville, McCullochs Mills, Bunker Hill, and Honey Grove.

== Demographics ==
Historical population
Census	Pop.	Note	%±
1850	1,175		—
1860	1,303		10.9%
1870	1,492		14.5%
1880	1,591		6.6%
1890	1,379		−13.3%
1900	1,442		4.6%
1910	1,267		−12.1%
1920	1,094		−13.7%
1930	924		−15.5%
1940	1,038		12.3%
1950	1,027		−1.1%
1960	969		−5.6%
1970	879		−9.3%
1980	1,004		14.2%
1990	1,099		9.5%
2000	1,159		5.5%
2010	1,240		7.0%
2020	1,131		−8.8%
2022 (est.)	1,128		−0.3%
U.S. Decennial Census

As of the census of 2000, there were 1,159 people, 445 households, and 335 families residing in the township.

The population density was 24.5 people per square mile (9.4/km^{2}). There were 647 housing units at an average density of 13.7/sq mi (5.3/km^{2}).

The racial makeup of the township was 98.88% White, 0.17% African American, 0.26% Native American, 0.26% Asian, and 0.43% from two or more races. Hispanic or Latino of any race were 0.95% of the population.

There were 445 households, out of which 32.1% had children under the age of eighteen living with them; 61.6% were married couples living together, 7.2% had a female householder with no husband present, and 24.5% were non-families. 20.2% of all households were made up of individuals, and 9.7% had someone living alone who was sixty-five years of age or older.

The average household size was 2.60 and the average family size was 2.99.

Within the township, the population was spread out, with 24.0% of residents who were under the age of eighteen, 9.0% who were aged eighteen to twenty-four, 27.9% who were aged twenty-five to forty-four, 25.5% who were aged forty-five to sixty-four, and 13.6% who were sixty-five years of age or older. The median age was thirty-eight years.

For every one hundred females, there were 108.5 males. For every one hundred females who were aged eighteen or older, there were 106.8 males.

The median income for a household in the township was $31,471, and the median income for a family was $37,614. Males had a median income of $26,714 compared with that of $18,594 for females.

The per capita income for the township was $15,264.

Approximately 7.7% of families and 12.9% of the population were living below the poverty line, including 14.5% of those who were under the age of eighteen and 11.3% of those who were aged sixty-five or older.
