= Second Battle of Bull Run order of battle: Union =

The following Union Army units and commanders fought in the Second Battle of Bull Run, also known as the Second Battle of Manassas, of the American Civil War. The Confederate order of battle is listed separately. Order of battle compiled from the army organization during the battle, the casualty returns and the reports.

== Abbreviations used ==
=== Military rank ===
- MG = Major General
- BG = Brigadier General
- Col = Colonel
- Ltc = Lieutenant Colonel
- Maj = Major
- Cpt = Captain
- Lt = Lieutenant

=== Other ===
- w = wounded
- mw = mortally wounded
- k = killed
- c = captured

== Union forces ==
=== Army of Virginia ===
MG John Pope

Chief of Staff: Col George D. Ruggles
Chief of Artillery: Cpt Alexander Piper
Chief of Cavalry: BG Washington L. Elliott (w)

Headquarters Escort:

- 1st Ohio Cavalry, Companies A and C

==== I Corps ====
MG Franz Sigel (w)

Chief of Artillery: Cpt Ulric Dahlgren

Headquarters Escort:

- 1st Indiana Cavalry, Companies I and K

Division	Brigade	Regiments and Others
First Division; BG Robert C. Schenck (w); BG Julius Stahel	1st Brigade BG Julius Stahel; Col Adolphus Buschbeck	8th New York: Ltc Carl B. Hedterich; 41st New York: Ltc Ernest W. Holmstedt; 45th New York: Ltc Edward W. Wratislaw; 27th Pennsylvania: Col Adolphus Buschbeck, Ltc Lorenz Cantador; New York Light Artillery, 2nd Battery: Lt F. J. T. Blume
First Division; BG Robert C. Schenck (w); BG Julius Stahel	2nd Brigade Col Nathaniel C. McLean	25th Ohio: Col William P. Richardson; 55th Ohio: Col John C. Lee; 73rd Ohio: Col Orland Smith; 75th Ohio: Maj Robert Reily; 1st Ohio Light Artillery, Battery K: Lt George B. Haskin
Second Division; BG Adolph von Steinwehr	1st Brigade Col John A. Koltes (k); Ltc Gustavus A. Muhleck	29th New York: Col Clemens Soest (w), Maj Louis Hartman; 68th New York: Ltc John H. Kleefisch (mw); 73rd Pennsylvania: Ltc Gustavus A. Muhleck, Cpt Augustus Brueckner (k), Cpt Charles C. Cresson (w), Cpt Lewis Talter (w)
Third Division; BG Carl Schurz	1st Brigade Col Alexander Schimmelfennig	61st Ohio: Ltc Stephen J. McGroarty; 74th Pennsylvania: Maj Franz Blessing; 8th West Virginia: Cpt Hedgman Slack; Pennsylvania Light Artillery, Battery F: Cpt Robert B. Hampton
Third Division; BG Carl Schurz	2nd Brigade Col Wlodzimierz Krzyzanowski	54th New York: Ltc Charles Ashby; 58th New York: Maj William Henkel (w), Cpt Frederick Braun; 75th Pennsylvania: Ltc Francis Mahler; 2nd New York Artillery, Battery L: Cpt Jacob Roemer
Third Division; BG Carl Schurz	Unattached	3rd West Virginia Cavalry, Company C: Cpt Jonathan Stahl; 1st Ohio Light Artillery, Battery I: Cpt Hubert Dilger
Reporting directly	Independent Brigade BG Robert H. Milroy	82nd Ohio: Col James Cantwell (k), Ltc James S. Robinson; 2nd West Virginia: Col George R. Latham; 3rd West Virginia: Col David T. Hewes/Ltc Francis W. Thompson; 5th West Virginia: Col John L. Zeigler; 1st West Virginia Cavalry, Companies C, E, and L: Maj John S. Krepps; Ohio Light Artillery, 12th Battery: Cpt Aaron C. Johnson
Reporting directly	Cavalry Brigade Col John Beardsley	1st Connecticut Battalion; 1st Maryland: Ltc Charles Wetschky; 4th New York: Ltc Ferris Nazer; 9th New York: Maj Charles McL. Knox; 6th Ohio: Col William R. Lloyd
Reporting directly	Reserve Artillery Cpt Louis Schirmer	1st New York Light, Battery I: Cpt Michael Wiedrich; New York Light, 13th Battery: Cpt Julius Dieckmann; West Virginia Light, Battery C: Lt Wallace Hill

==== II Corps ====
Brigade	Regiments and Others
Cavalry Brigade BG John Buford (w)	1st Michigan: Col Thornton F. Brodhead (mw), Maj Charles H. Town; 5th New York: Col Othniel DeForest; 1st Vermont: Col Charles H. Tompkins; 1st West Virginia: Ltc Nathaniel P. Richmond
Artillery	Maine Light, 6th Battery: Cpt Freeman McGilvery

==== III Corps ====
MG Irvin McDowell

Chief of Staff: Col Edmund Schriver
Chief of Artillery: Maj Davis Tillson

Headquarters Troops:

- Maine Light Artillery, 3rd Battery (Pontonniers): Cpt James G. Swett
- 13th Pennsylvania Reserves (1st Rifles), Companies C, G, H and I: Ltc Thomas L. Kane

Division	Brigade	Regiments and Others
First Division; BG Rufus King; BG John P. Hatch (w); BG Abner Doubleday	1st Brigade BG John P. Hatch; Col Timothy Sullivan	22nd New York: Col Walter Phelps, Jr.; 24th New York: Col Timothy Sullivan, Ltc Samuel Beardsley (w), Maj Andrew Barney (w); 30th New York: Col Edward Frisby (k); 84th New York (14th Militia): Ltc Edward B. Fowler (w), Maj William H. DeBevoise; 2nd United States Sharpshooters: Col Henry A. V. Post
First Division; BG Rufus King; BG John P. Hatch (w); BG Abner Doubleday	2nd Brigade BG Abner Doubleday; Col William P. Wainwright	76th New York: Col William P. Wainwright, Maj Charles E. Livingstone; 95th New York: Ltc James B. Post; 56th Pennsylvania: Col Sullivan A. Meredith (w), Ltc William Hofmann
First Division; BG Rufus King; BG John P. Hatch (w); BG Abner Doubleday	3rd Brigade BG Marsena R. Patrick	21st New York: Col William F. Rogers; 23rd New York: Ltc Nirom M. Crane; 35th New York: Col Newton B. Lord; 80th New York (20th Militia): Col George W. Pratt (mw), Ltc Theodore B. Gates
First Division; BG Rufus King; BG John P. Hatch (w); BG Abner Doubleday	4th Brigade BG John Gibbon	19th Indiana: Col Solomon Meredith; 2nd Wisconsin: Col Edgar O'Conner (k), Ltc Lucius Fairchild; 6th Wisconsin: Col Lysander Cutler (w), Ltc Edward S. Bragg; 7th Wisconsin: Col William W. Robinson (w), Ltc Charles A. Hamilton (w), Ltc Lucius Fairchild
First Division; BG Rufus King; BG John P. Hatch (w); BG Abner Doubleday	Artillery	New Hampshire Light, 1st Battery: Cpt George A. Gerrish (c), Lt Frederick M. Edgell; 1st New York Light, Battery L: Cpt John A. Reynolds; 1st Rhode Island Light, Battery D: Cpt J. Albert Monroe; 4th United States, Battery B: Cpt Joseph B. Campbell
Second Division; BG James B. Ricketts	1st Brigade BG Abram Duryée	97th New York: Ltc John P. Spofford; 104th New York: Maj Lewis C. Skinner; 105th New York: Col Howard Carroll; 107th Pennsylvania: Col Thomas F. McCoy
Second Division; BG James B. Ricketts	2nd Brigade BG Zealous B. Tower (w); Col William H. Christian	26th New York: Col William H. Christian, Ltc Richard H. Richardson; 94th New York: Col Adrian R. Root (w); 88th Pennsylvania: Ltc Joseph A. McLean (k), Maj George W. Gile; 90th Pennsylvania: Col Peter Lyle
Second Division; BG James B. Ricketts	3rd Brigade Col John W. Stiles	12th Massachusetts: Col Fletcher Webster (k), Ltc Timothy M. Bryan, Jr.; 13th Massachusetts: Col Samuel H. Leonard; 83rd New York (9th Militia): Ltc William Atterbury; 11th Pennsylvania: Col Richard Coulter
Second Division; BG James B. Ricketts	4th Brigade Col Joseph Thoburn (w)	7th Indiana: Lieutenant Col John F. Cheek; 84th Pennsylvania: Col Samuel M. Bowman; 110th Pennsylvania: Col William D. Lewis, Jr.; 1st West Virginia: Ltc Henry B. Hubbard
Second Division; BG James B. Ricketts	Artillery	Maine Light, 2nd Battery: Cpt James A. Hall; Maine Light, 5th Battery: Cpt George F. Leppien; 1st Pennsylvania Light, Battery F: Cpt Ezra W. Matthews; Pennsylvania Light, Battery C: Cpt James Thompson
Pennsylvania Reserves; BG John F. Reynolds	1st Brigade BG George G. Meade	3rd Pennsylvania Reserves: Col Horatio G. Sickel; 4th Pennsylvania Reserves: Col Albert L. Magilton; 7th Pennsylvania Reserves: Ltc Robert M. Henderson (w); 8th Pennsylvania Reserves: Cpt William Lemon; 13th Pennsylvania Reserves (1st Rifles), Companies A, B, D, E, F and K: Col Hugh W. McNeil
Pennsylvania Reserves; BG John F. Reynolds	2nd Brigade BG Truman Seymour	1st Pennsylvania Reserves: Col Richard Biddle Roberts; 2nd Pennsylvania Reserves: Col William McCandless (w); 5th Pennsylvania Reserves: Ltc George Dare; 6th Pennsylvania Reserves: Col William Sinclair
Pennsylvania Reserves; BG John F. Reynolds	3rd Brigade BG Conrad F. Jackson; Col Martin Davis Hardin (w); Col James T. Kirk (w); Ltc Robert Anderson	9th Pennsylvania Reserves: Ltc Robert Anderson, Maj James M. Snodgrass; 10th Pennsylvania Reserves: Col James T. Kirk; 11th Pennsylvania Reserves: Ltc Samuel M. Jackson; 12th Pennsylvania Reserves: Col Martin D. Hardin, Cpt Richard Gustin
Pennsylvania Reserves; BG John F. Reynolds	Artillery Cpt Dunbar R. Ransom	1st Pennsylvania Light, Battery A: Lt John G. Simpson; 1st Pennsylvania Light, Battery B: Cpt James H. Cooper; 1st Pennsylvania Light, Battery G: Cpt Mark Kern; 5th United States, Battery C: Cpt Dunbar R. Ransom
Reporting directly	Cavalry Brigade BG George D. Bayard	1st Maine: Col Samuel H. Allen; 2nd New York: Col J. Mansfield Davies; 1st New Jersey: Ltc Joseph Karge (w), Maj Ivins D. Jones; 1st Pennsylvania: Col Owen Jones; 1st Rhode Island: Col Alfred N. Duffié
Reporting directly	Unattached	3rd Indiana Cavalry (detachment); Indiana Light Artillery, 16th Battery: Cpt Charles A. Naylor; 4th United States, Battery E: Cpt Joseph C. Clark, Jr.

==== Reserve Corps ====
BG Samuel D. Sturgis

Brigade	Regiments and Others
Piatt's Brigade BG Abram S. Piatt	63rd Indiana (Companies A, B, C and D): Ltc John S. Williams; 86th New York: Col Benajah P. Bailey

=== Army of the Potomac ===
The following Corps from the Army of the Potomac were attached to the Army of Virginia.

==== III Corps ====
MG Samuel P. Heintzelman

Division	Brigade	Regiments and Others
First Division; MG Philip Kearny	1st Brigade BG John C. Robinson	20th Indiana: Col William L. Brown (k), Maj John Wheeler; 30th Ohio Infantry (6 cos.), Lt. Col. Theodore Jones; 63rd Pennsylvania: Col Alexander Hays (w), Cpt James F. Ryan (w); 105th Pennsylvania: Ltc Calvin A. Craig (w), Maj Jacob W. Greenwalt
First Division; MG Philip Kearny	2nd Brigade BG David B. Birney	3rd Maine: Cpt Moses B. Lakeman, Maj Edwin Burt; 4th Maine: Col Elijah Walker; 1st New York: Maj Edwin Burt, Cpt Joseph Yeamans; 38th New York: Col J. H. Hobart Ward; 40th New York: Col Thomas W. Egan; 101st New York: Ltc Nelson A. Gesner; 57th Pennsylvania: Maj William Birney
First Division; MG Philip Kearny	3rd Brigade Col Orlando Poe	2nd Michigan: Ltc Louis Dillman; 3rd Michigan: Col Stephen G. Champlin (w), Maj Byron R. Pierce; 5th Michigan: Cpt William Wakenshaw; 37th New York: Col Samuel B. Hayman; 99th Pennsylvania: Col Asher S. Leidy
First Division; MG Philip Kearny	Artillery	1st Rhode Island Light, Battery E: Cpt George E. Randolph; 1st United States, Battery K: Cpt William M. Graham
Second Division; MG Joseph Hooker	1st Brigade BG Cuvier Grover	1st Massachusetts: Col Robert Cowdin; 11th Massachusetts: Col William E. Blaisdell; 16th Massachusetts: Maj Gardner Banks; 2nd New Hampshire: Col Gilman Marston; 26th Pennsylvania: Maj Robert L. Bodine
Second Division; MG Joseph Hooker	2nd Brigade Col Nelson Taylor	70th New York: Cpt Charles L. Young; 71st New York: Cpt Owen Murphy; 72nd New York: Cpt Harman J. Bliss; 73rd New York: Cpt M. William Burns; 74th New York: Maj Edward L. Price
Second Division; MG Joseph Hooker	3rd Brigade Col Joseph B. Carr	5th New Jersey: Ltc William J. Sewell; 6th New Jersey: Col Gershom Mott (w), Ltc George C. Burling; 7th New Jersey: Col Joseph W. Revere; 8th New Jersey: Ltc William Ward (w), Cpt John Tuite (k), Cpt George Hoffman, Cpt Oliver S. Johnson, Cpt Daniel Blauvelt, Jr.; 2nd New York: Cpt Sidney W. Park; 115th Pennsylvania: Ltc Robert Thompson

==== V Corps ====
MG Fitz John Porter

Chief of Staff: Ltc Frederick T. Locke

Division	Brigade	Regiments and Others
First Division; BG Daniel Butterfield	1st Brigade Col Charles W. Roberts	2nd Maine: Maj Daniel F. Sargent; 18th Massachusetts: Maj Joseph Hayes; 1st Michigan: Col Horace S. Roberts (k), Cpt Emery W. Belton; 13th New York: Col Elisha G. Marshall; 25th New York: Col Charles A. Johnson
First Division; BG Daniel Butterfield	3rd Brigade Col Henry S. Lansing; Col Henry A. Weeks (w); Col James C. Rice	16th Michigan: Cpt Thomas J. Barry (w), Cpt Henry H. Sibley; 12th New York: Col Henry A. Weeks, Cpt Adrian I. Root (w), Cpt William Huson; 17th New York: Col Henry S. Lansing, Maj William T. C. Grower (w), Cpt John Vickers; 44th New York: Col James C. Rice, Maj Freeman Conner; 83rd Pennsylvania: Ltc Hugh S. Campbell (w), Maj William R. Lamont (w), Cpt John Graham (w), Cpt Orpheus S. Woodward
First Division; BG Daniel Butterfield	Sharpshooters	1st United States: Col Hiram Berdan
First Division; BG Daniel Butterfield	Artillery	1st Rhode Island Light, Battery C: Cpt Richard Waterman; 5th United States, Battery D: Lt Charles E. Hazlett
Second Division; BG George Sykes	1st Brigade Ltc Robert C. Buchanan	3rd United States: Cpt John D. Wilkins; 4th United States: Cpt Joseph B. Collins (w), Cpt Hiram Dryer; 12th United States, 1st Battalion: Cpt Matthew M. Blunt; 14th United States, 1st Battalion: Cpt John D. O'Connell (w), Cpt W. Harvey Brown; 14th United States, 2nd Battalion: Cpt David B. McKibbin (w)
Second Division; BG George Sykes	2nd Brigade Ltc William Chapman	1st and 6th United States: Cpt Levi C. Bootes; 2nd and 10th United States: Maj Charles S. Lovell; 11th United States: Maj Delancey Floyd-Jones; 17th United States: Maj George L. Andrews
Second Division; BG George Sykes	3rd Brigade Col Gouverneur K. Warren	5th New York: Cpt Cleveland Winslow; 10th New York: Col John E. Bendix
Second Division; BG George Sykes	Artillery Cpt Stephen H. Weed	1st United States, Batteries E and G: Lt Alanson M. Randol; 5th United States, Battery I: Cpt Stephen H. Weed; 5th United States, Battery K: Cpt John R. Smead (k), Lt William E. Van Reed

==== IX Corps ====
MG Jesse L. Reno

Division	Brigade	Regiments and Others
First Division; BG Isaac I. Stevens	1st Brigade Col Benjamin C. Christ	8th Michigan: Ltc Frank Graves; 50th Pennsylvania: Ltc Thomas S. Brenholtz (w), Maj Edward Overton, Jr.
First Division; BG Isaac I. Stevens	2nd Brigade Col Daniel Leasure (w); Ltc David A. Leckey	46th New York (5 companies): Col Rudolph Rosa (w), Maj Julius Parcus; 100th Pennsylvania: Ltc David A. Leckey (w), Cpt James E. Cornelius
First Division; BG Isaac I. Stevens	3rd Brigade Col Addison Farnsworth	28th Massachusetts: Maj George W. Cartwright (w), Cpt Andrew P. Caraher; 79th New York: Ltc David Morrison
First Division; BG Isaac I. Stevens	Artillery	Massachusetts Light, 8th Battery: Cpt Asa M. Cook; 2nd U.S. Artillery, Battery E: Lt Samuel N. Benjamin
Second Division; MG Jesse L. Reno	1st Brigade Col James Nagle	2nd Maryland: Ltc J. Eugene Duryèe; 6th New Hampshire: Col Simon G. Griffin; 48th Pennsylvania: Ltc Joshua K. Sigfried
Second Division; MG Jesse L. Reno	2nd Brigade Col Edward Ferrero	21st Massachusetts: Col William S. Clark; 51st New York: Ltc Robert Brown Potter; 51st Pennsylvania: Col John F. Hartranft
Second Division; MG Jesse L. Reno	Artillery	Pennsylvania Light, Battery D: Cpt George W. Durell
