= George F. McFarland =

Educator and Union Army officer (1834-1891)

George Fisher McFarland
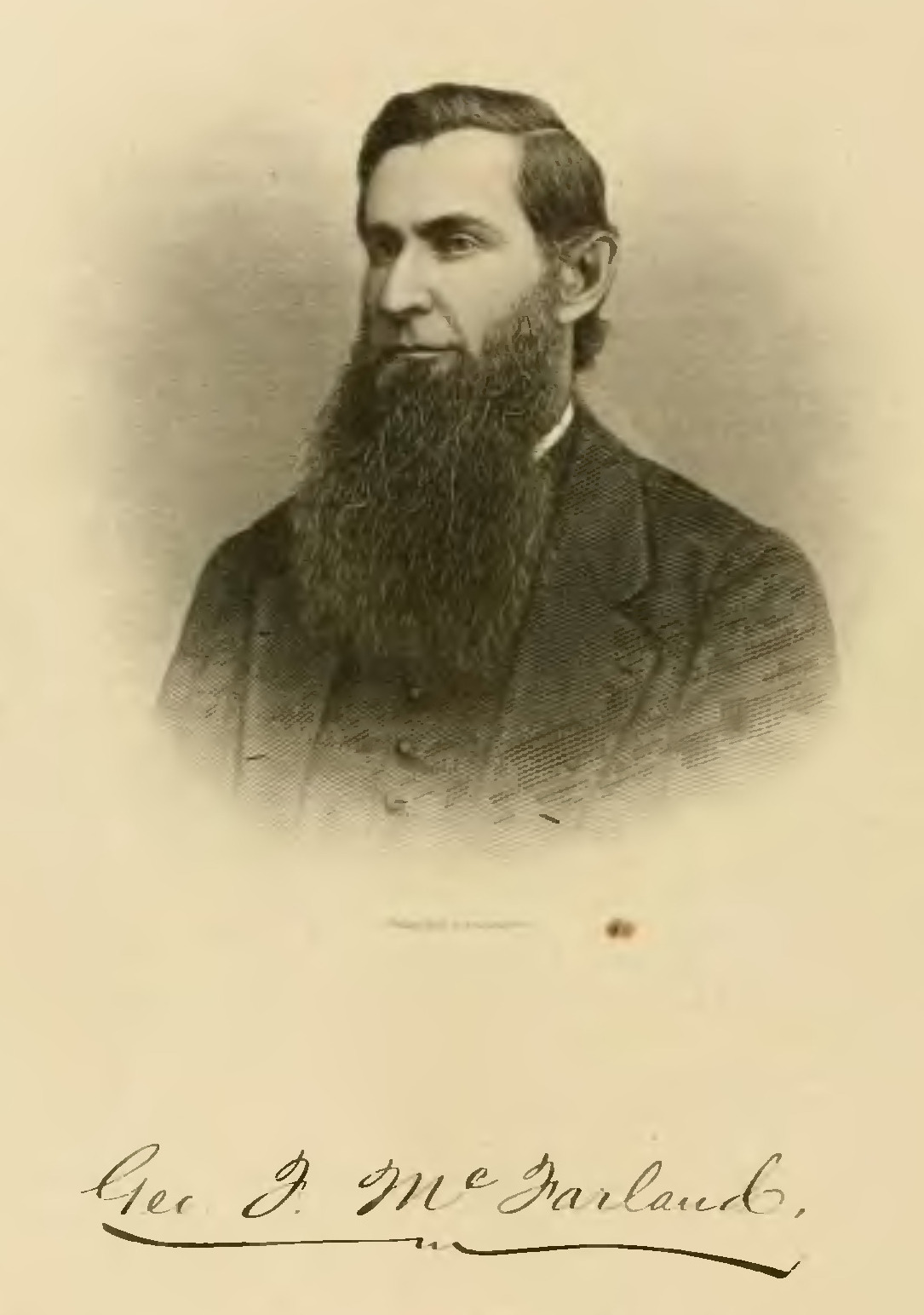
- Born: April 28, 1834; Dauphin County, Pennsylvania, US
- Died: December 18, 1891 (aged 57); Tallapoosa, Georgia, US
- Military career
- Allegiance: United States
- Branch: Union Army
- Service years: 1862–1863
- Rank: Lieutenant Colonel
- Unit: 151st Pennsylvania Infantry
- Conflicts: American Civil War: Battle of Chancellorsville; Battle of Gettysburg

George Fisher McFarland (April 28, 1834 – December 18, 1891) was an American educator from Juniata County, Pennsylvania and an officer in the Union Army during the Civil War. He was the lieutenant colonel of the 151st Pennsylvania Infantry and commanded the regiment in severe combat during first day of the Battle of Gettysburg.

== Early life ==
George McFarland was born on April 28, 1834, to John and Elizabeth McFarland at Todd's Mill in Dauphin County, Pennsylvania. At age fifteen, the family moved to the city of Harrisburg, and he began working as a boat pilot with his father on the Susquehanna River. As early as age sixteen, he worked as an amateur teacher in the Harrisburg area. In the early 1850s, he attended Freeburg Academy in Snyder County. Following his graduation, he became an assistant teacher and later principal at Freeburg. In 1856, at age twenty-one, he married Adeline "Addie" Griesemer, who was two years senior to him. While serving as principal at the school in Freeburg, he started a family with Addie. Their first child, Clara, was born in August, 1857, but died in 1860.

In December, 1858, the McFarland purchased an academy in McAlisterville and moved his family there as he set to work as principal there. Upon taking over McAlisterville Academy, McFarland began expanding the school's curriculum and facilities. Under McFarland's administration, the academy taught mathematics, science, music, languages, art, and physical education. Enrollment at the academy between 1858 and 1862 ranged between 43 and 70 students. While living in McAlisterville, the McFarlands had a son, John Horace, in 1859, and a daughter, Emma Viola, in 1862.

== Civil War service ==
When the American Civil War began in April, 1861, McFarland chose to remain in McAlisterville and continue his duties as an educator. However in 1862, the war no longer appeared that it would come to a quick resolution. In July, President Abraham Lincoln issued a call for 300,000 additional volunteers to enlist in the Union Army. McFarland took up the task of recruiting a company of men from Juniata County for service to the Union. Countered in a rough recruiting race by cavalryman John K. Robison, McFarland gathered from the county roughly forty men and transported them to Camp Curtin in Harrisburg. Upon arriving in Harrisburg, McFarland was commissioned captain, and his company was placed alongside nine other companies to comprise what would thenceforth be designated as the 151st Pennsylvania Infantry. In an election by the other company officers, McFarland was then made lieutenant colonel of the regiment. Harrison Allen, formerly major of the 10th Pennsylvania Reserve Regiment, was made colonel of the regiment. The regiment went on to take part in Joseph Hooker's Chancellorsville Campaign, serving as skirmishers on the right flank of I Corps.

Three months later, at the first day of fighting at Gettysburg, with Col. Allen away on furlough due to illness, McFarland capably led the 151st as his regiment covered the retreat of the battered Union Army's I Corps through the town of Gettysburg.

The regiment at the time of the battle was part of Brig. Gen. Thomas Rowley's brigade, Maj. Gen. Abner Doubleday's division of Maj. Gen. John F. Reynolds' I Corps. Having spent the night of June 30 encamped along Marsh Creek roughly six miles southwest of the town of Gettysburg, the regiment received orders to march shortly before 8:00 a.m. the next morning. The regiment arrived at the scene of the morning's fighting northwest of town not long after 11:00 a.m. McFarland and his regiment were placed at the Lutheran Theological Seminary to act as the I Corps' emergency reserve. The regiment assisted in constructing crude breastworks in front of the Seminary until roughly 3:00 p.m. when Gen. Rowley ordered McFarland to move his regiment forward to Herbst Woods - now known as Reynolds' Woods - to assist the Iron Brigade. The Midwesterners of the Iron Brigade, under the command of Brig. Gen. Solomon Meredith, had been the first infantry engaged that morning and were being worn thin as they attempted to repel repeated attacks from Confederate Maj. Gen. William Pender's division. As the Iron Brigade fell back, the 151st held off several enemy attacks along Willoughby Run, which ran through Herbst Woods. The 151st was forced to hold alone and barely supported. During their defense, they dueled with Col. Abner Perrin's South Carolina brigade and caused enormous casualties to that brigade. Eventually, the regiment was relieved and allowed to fall back. Lt. Col. McFarland had his regiment rally at the Lutheran Theological Seminary, where several other regiments were also rallying. As they gathered, McFarland was met by a Federal lieutenant on horseback who held next to him a furled regimental flag. The lieutenant asked McFarland, "Sir, is this your flag?"

McFarland, horrified at the realization that his men may have lost their colors, was about to reply when a gust of wind flung the flag out. The flag read that it belonged to the 142nd Pennsylvania Infantry. Relieved, McFarland pointed out the commander of the 142nd to the lieutenant and then proceeded to continue organizing his regiment around his own colors, which soon appeared. Once the men were rallied, McFarland had them throw up a quick barricade around the Seminary building where the men would hold against the advancing Confederates, who were then bearing down upon them. With a few other regiments, the 151st held off repeated enemy attacks. During this fighting, a thick smoke from the heavy gunfire had engulfed the area. McFarland stooped down to try to see under some of the smoke to locate the enemy when a bullet went through his left leg and into his right. A private with Company F had lifted him up off the ground and put McFarland's arm around his shoulder to support him. The private then proceeded to take McFarland into the Seminary for medical attention when a bullet came so close to them that it took the middle cuff button off of McFarland's uniform as the private supported him.

The 151st Pennsylvania was the last regiment to pull back in the retreat to Cemetery Ridge. McFarland was treated in the Seminary. His left leg was amputated below the knee. Shortly after Gettysburg, McFarland and the 151st Pennsylvania Infantry were mustered out of the Union army, their nine-month term of enlistment having expired.

== Postbellum ==
After the war, the disabled McFarland moved his family to Harrisburg where he founded a printing company and a nursery. McFarland was the father of three children and the superintendent of an orphanage. One of his children, J. Horace McFarland, started to work in his father's printing shop at age twelve and became one of the first American publishers to sound the call for environmental and scenic protection.

== See also ==
- 151st Pennsylvania Infantry
