= Harrison Allen (general) =

American public official (1835–1904)

Harrison Allen (December 4, 1835 – September 23, 1904) was an American soldier and public official who served as an officer in the American Civil War, and later as a member of both houses of the Pennsylvania Legislature, United States Marshall of the North Dakota Territory, and auditor general of Pennsylvania.

Born in Russellburg, Warren County, Pennsylvania, to Samuel P. and Mary Thompson Allen, Allen attended the local schools and academies in New York.

Harrison Allen was a Union Army officer in the American Civil War, serving as major of the 10th Pennsylvania Reserve Regiment and captain of Company F, and then elected colonel of the 151st Pennsylvania Infantry Regiment. He was mustered out on July 31, 1863, and later was awarded the grade of brevet brigadier general.

Allen practiced law in Tidioute, Pennsylvania, for many years. In 1865, he was elected as a Republican to the Pennsylvania House of Representatives, serving until 1866. He was a delegate to the 1868 Republican National Convention and served in the Pennsylvania State Senate from 1870 to 1872 when he was elected auditor general of Pennsylvania. He was unsuccessful in his bid for reelection to that office in 1874, his term ending in 1875. He was a delegate to the 1880 Republican National Convention and ran for a seat in the United States Congress in 1882. Failing in that effort, he was appointed United States Marshall for the Dakota Territory by President Chester A. Arthur, serving from 1882 to 1886. He made another unsuccessful attempt to gain election to the United States Congress in 1888, and in 1901 was appointed by President Theodore Roosevelt as deputy auditor of the United States Post Office, where he remained until his death.

Allen died at the age of 68 and was interred at Arlington National Cemetery.
