= Robert Day =

Robert Day may refer to:

- Robert Day (antiquarian) (1836–1914), Irish antiquarian and photographer
- Robert Day (Australian politician) (1886–1968), New South Wales politician
- Robert H. Day (judge) (1867–1933), lawyer and judge in Ohio
- Robert H. Day (soldier) (1835–1929), Union officer, railroad engineer and electrical engineer
- Robert Day (Irish politician, born 1746) (1746–1841), Irish politician, barrister and judge
- Robert Day (Irish politician, born 1884) (1884–1949), Irish Labour Party politician from Cork
- Robert Day (cartoonist) (1900–1985), American cartoonist
- Robert L. Day (1920–1999), mayor of Boise, Idaho
- Robert Day (director) (1922–2017), English film director
- Robert Day (footballer) (born 1944), former Australian rules footballer
- Robert Addison Day (1943–2023), businessman
- Robert Day (basketball) (born 1982), American basketball player

== See also ==
- Bob Day (disambiguation)
