= J. Horace McFarland =

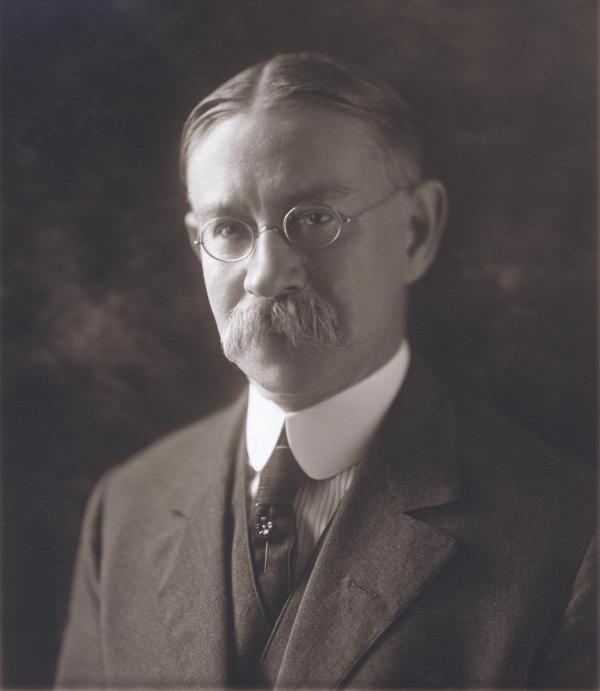
- Born: John Horace McFarland; September 29, 1859; McAlisterville, Pennsylvania, U.S.
- Died: October 2, 1948 (aged 89); Harrisburg, Pennsylvania, U.S.
- Occupations: Businessman, writer
- Spouse: Lydis S. Walters (m. 1884)
- Children: Robert B. McFarland (Born 16 July 1888), Helen L. McFarland (Born 11 July 1885)
- Parents: George F. McFarland (father); Adeline D. McFarland (née Griesemer) (mother)

Signature
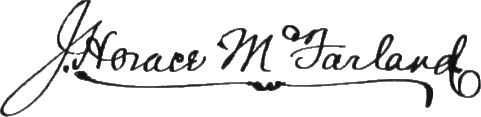

John Horace McFarland (1859–1948) was an American businessman and writer. He was a leading proponent of the "City Beautiful Movement" in the United States.

== Life ==
J. Horace McFarland was born in McAlisterville, Pennsylvania on September 24, 1859, the son of Union Army colonel George F. McFarland. He lived and worked most of his adult life in Harrisburg, Pennsylvania, residing at an estate he named Breeze Hill in the Bellevue Park area of the city. At the estate, McFarland established gardens that featured numerous trees, vegetables, and, most prominently, roses. Photos of his famous gardens are held in the Smithsonian Institution.

He married Lydis S. Walters on May 22, 1884, and they had two children.

McFarland served as president of the American Civic Association (ACA) from 1904 to 1924 and the American Rose Society. McFarland and the ACA were a major force promoting civic improvement, environmental conservation, and beautification in the United States. McFarland helped organize the defense of Niagara Falls from development efforts by power companies, worked to protect Yosemite National Park with the famous environmental preservationist John Muir, who has been hailed as the father of the National Park Service.

McFarland died in Harrisburg on October 2, 1948, and was buried at Harrisburg Cemetery.

He is remembered for a statement at the first Conference of Governors held at the White House, Washington D.C., in 1908:

It is the love of country that has lighted and that keeps glowing the holy fire of patriotism.

His papers are held at the Pennsylvania State Archives.
