= 102nd Pennsylvania Infantry Regiment =

Union Army volunteer infantry regiment

102nd Pennsylvania Volunteer Infantry
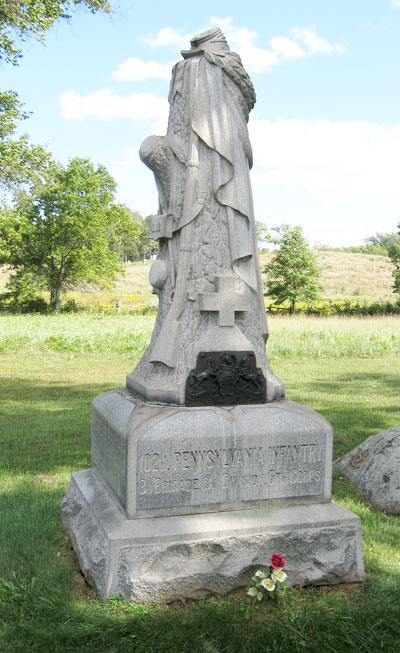
- Monument to the 102nd Pennsylvania Infantry at Gettysburg
- Active: August 1861 to June 28, 1865
- Country: United States
- Allegiance: Union
- Branch: Infantry
- Size: 2,099
- Engagements: American Civil War: Peninsula campaign; Siege of Yorktown; Battle of Williamsburg; Battle of Seven Pines; Seven Days Battles; Battle of Malvern Hill; Battle of Chantilly (reserve); Battle of Antietam (reserve); Battle of Fredericksburg (reserve); Battle of Chancellorsville; Battle of Salem Church; Battle of Gettysburg; Bristoe Campaign; Mine Run Campaign; Overland Campaign; Battle of the Wilderness; Battle of Spotsylvania Court House; Battle of Totopotomoy Creek; Battle of Cold Harbor; Siege of Petersburg; Battle of Jerusalem Plank Road; Valley campaigns of 1864; Battle of Fort Stevens; Battle of Cool Spring; Battle of Summit Point; Third Battle of Winchester; Battle of Fisher's Hill; Battle of Cedar Creek; Appomattox Campaign; Third Battle of Petersburg; Battle of Appomattox Court House

The 102nd Pennsylvania Volunteer Infantry was an infantry regiment that served in the Union Army during the American Civil War.

== Service ==
The 102nd Pennsylvania Infantry was organized at Pittsburgh, Pennsylvania in August 1861 and mustered in for a three-year enlistment under the command of Colonel Thomas Algeo Rowley.

The regiment was attached to Peck's Brigade, Couch's Division, Army of the Potomac, October 1861 to March, 1862. 3rd Brigade, 1st Division, IV Corps, Army of the Potomac, to July 1862. 2nd Brigade, 1st Division, IV Corps, Army of the Potomac, to September, 1862. 2nd Brigade, 3rd Division, VI Corps, Army of the Potomac, to October 1862. 3rd Brigade, 3rd Division, VI Corps, to January 1864. Wheaton's Brigade, Department of West Virginia, to March 1864. 1st Brigade, 2nd Division, VI Corps, Army of the Potomac and Army of the Shenandoah, to June 1865.

The 102nd Pennsylvania Infantry mustered out of service June 28, 1865.

== Detailed service ==
Five companies left Pennsylvania for Washington, D.C., August 21, 1861. Duty in the defenses of Washington, D. C, until March 1862. Advance on Manassas, Va., March 10–15. Moved to the Peninsula March 28. Siege of Yorktown April 5–May 4. Battle of Williamsburg May 5. Operations about Bottoms Bridge May 20–23. Battle of Fair Oaks, Seven Pines, May 31 – June 1. Seven Days before Richmond June 25 – July 1. Malvern Hill July 1. At Harrison's Landing until August 16. Movement to Alexandria, then to Centreville August 16–30. Covered Pope's retreat to Fairfax Court House August 30 – September 1. Chantilly September 1 (reserve). Maryland Campaign September 6–27. Battle of Antietam September 16–17. At Downsville, Md., September 23 to October 20. Movement to Stafford Court House October 20 – November 18, and to Belle Plains December 5. Battle of Fredericksburg, Va., December 12–15. Burnside's 2nd Campaign, "Mud March," January 20–24, 1863. At Falmouth until April. Chancellorsville Campaign April 27 – May 6. Operations at Franklin's Crossing April 29 – May 2. Maryes Heights, Fredericksburg, May 3. Salem Heights May 3–4. Banks' Ford May 4. Gettysburg Campaign June 13 – July 24. Battle of Gettysburg July 2–4. Pursuit of Lee July 5–24. Duty on line of the Rappahannock until October. Bristoe Campaign October 9–22. Advance to line of the Rappahannock November 7–8. Rappahannock Station November 7. Mine Run Campaign November 26 – December 2. Rapidan Campaign May 4–June 12, 1864. Battles of the Wilderness May 5–7; Spotsylvania May 8–21. Assault on the Salient May 12. North Anna River May 23–26. On line of the Pamunkey May 26–28. Totopotomoy May 28–31. Cold Harbor June 1–12. Before Petersburg June 17–18. Jerusalem Plank Road June 22–23. Siege of Petersburg until July 9. Moved to Washington, D.C., July 9–11. Repulse of Early's attack on Washington July 11–12. Pursuit of Early to Snicker's Gap July 14–18, Sheridan's Shenandoah Valley Campaign August to December. Charlestown August 21–22. Demonstration on Gilbert's Ford, Opequan Creek, September 13. Strasburg September 21. Battle of Opequan, Winchester, September 19. Fisher's Hill September 22. Battle of Cedar Creek October 19. Duty in the Shenandoah Valley until December. Ordered to Petersburg December 9–12. Siege of Petersburg December 1864 to April 1865. Fort Stedman, Petersburg, March 25, 1865. Appomattox Campaign March 28 – April 9. Assault on and fall of Petersburg April 2. Pursuit of Lee April 3–9. Appomattox Court House April 9. Surrender of Lee and his army. March to Danville April 23–27, and duty there until May 23. Moved to Richmond, then to Washington, D.C., May 23 – June 3. Corps review June 8.

== Casualties ==
The regiment lost a total of 263 men during service; 10 officers and 171 enlisted men killed or mortally wounded, 1 officer and 81 enlisted men died of disease.

== Commanders ==
- Colonel Thomas Algeo Rowley - promoted to brigadier general November 29, 1862
- Colonel Joseph M. Kinkead - resigned May 27, 1863
- Colonel John W. Patterson - killed in action at the Battle of the Wilderness
- Colonel James Patchell
- Major Thomas McLaughlin - commanded at the Battle of Fort Stevens
- Major James H. Coleman - commanded at the Third Battle of Winchester

== See also ==
- List of Pennsylvania Civil War Units
- Pennsylvania in the Civil War
