= Sullivan Amory Meredith =

Union Army officer (1816–1874)

Sullivan A. Meredith
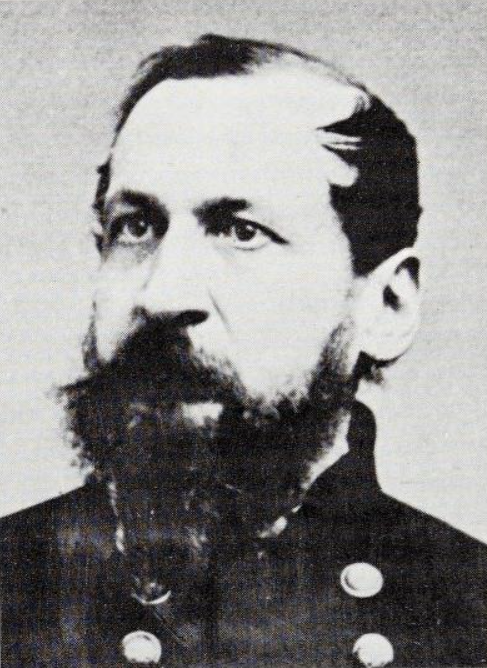
- Born: July 4, 1816; Philadelphia, Pennsylvania, US
- Died: December 26, 1874 (aged 58); Buffalo, New York, US
- Spouse: Julia F. Towne (m. 1864)
- Children: 4 (2 sons, 2 daughters)
- Military career
- Allegiance: Union
- Branch: Union Army: U.S. Volunteers
- Service years: 1861–1865
- Rank: Brigadier general (U.S.V.)
- Battles: American Civil War; Second Battle of Manassas (WIA); Battle of South Mountain; Battle of Antietam

Sullivan Amory Meredith (1816–1874) was an American businessman and volunteer army officer. He became a Colonel in the Union Army at the outset of the American Civil War, serving throughout the war, raising and leading two regiments of volunteers, and rising to the rank of brigadier general. In 1868 he penned a series of letters to the Buffalo Commercial Advertiser, in which he attacked Robert Ould, the former Confederate Commissioner for the exchange of prisoners of war.

== Early life ==
Sullivan Amory Meredith was the grandson of Jonathan and Elizabeth Meredith, who were born in Herefordshire, England, and settled In Philadelphia about the year 1750. His father was William Meredith, who graduated at the University of Pennsylvania, studied law, and became a prominent member of the legal profession. By his mother he was a descendant of Lewis Morris, Provincial Governor of New Jersey, one of the signers of the Declaration of Independence. He was one of six brothers. His brother Jonathan stood in his time in the front rank of the Baltimore Bar with such men as William Pinkney, Reverdy Johnson and others. His brother William Morris Meredith who died on August 17, 1873, was for many years one of the great lawyers of the Philadelphia Bar.

He was born in Philadelphia, Pennsylvania on July 5, 1816. It is not certain where he was educated. According to his obituary in the Buffalo Courier, Meredith received his early education at the University of Pennsylvania, and was probably graduated with honors. According to the Buffalo Commercial Advertiser, he was educated at William and Mary College, Virginia.

He engaged in various pursuits, but did not study for any profession. He had a great desire to travel, which he subsequently gratified, devoting several years of his early manhood to travel and observation. He twice made the voyage to China, and visited various other parts of the world. He was in California at the beginning of the gold excitement in 1848.

== Civil War ==
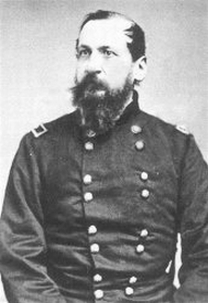
Sullivan A. Meredith

On the breaking out of the American Civil War he espoused the cause of the Union, and served with honor and distinction during the war. On either April 9, or 25, 1861, he was appointed Colonel of the 10th Pennsylvania Volunteers, his first commission; and served for some three months under the command of General Patterson, at which time the term for which the regiment was enlisted expired. He was shortly after appointed to the command and organization of Camp Curtin, at Harrisburg, where, in the course of four months, he superintended the drill, disciplining, equipment and forwarding of twenty or thirty thousand troops to the seat of war.

During the same period he raised another regiment, the 56th Pennsylvania Volunteers, and on March 7, 1862, reported with his command at Washington, and thence proceeded to the field. In the Second Battle of Manassas, August 30, 1862, he was severely wounded in the right shoulder by a minie ball; and on November 29, 1862 he was consequently commissioned Brigadier general of the Pennsylvania Volunteers, his commission being signed by Abraham Lincoln, President, and Edwin M. Stanton, Secretary of War. His regiment was in all the battles of General Pope's campaign; also at South Mountain and Antietam, and held high rank for bravery and efficiency. He remained in the service for four years and four months, being honorably discharged on August 24, 1865.

About August 1, 1863, he succeeded Colonel William H. Ludlow as Commissioner for the exchange of prisoners of war, and subsequently served as president of the Court Martial at St. Louis, Missouri.

== Later life ==
While in St. Louis he was married to Miss Julia F. Towne, sister of Mrs. D. Ransom and Mrs. J. F. Sabin, of Buffalo, New York, in October, 1864. There were born to them four children: two boys and two girls. He resided in that city until July 1865, and in September of the same year he came to Buffalo and became a member of the firm of Messrs. D. Ransom, Son & Co., wholesale druggists, late D. Ransom & Co., an extensive drug and medicine establishment, and continued prominently identified with the firm up to the time of his death.

General Meredith was connected with the Buffalo Commercial Advertiser, which described him, after his death in 1874, as "a man of literary as well as military attainments". In 1868 a series of letters from his pen were published in that newspaper, controverting the statements of the Confederate Commissioner, Robert Ould, in charging upon General Grant a responsibility for the poor treatment of captured Union soldiers by the Confederate authorities. General Meredith defended against that charge, and his treatment of Ould was, according to the Advertiser, scathing.

== Death ==
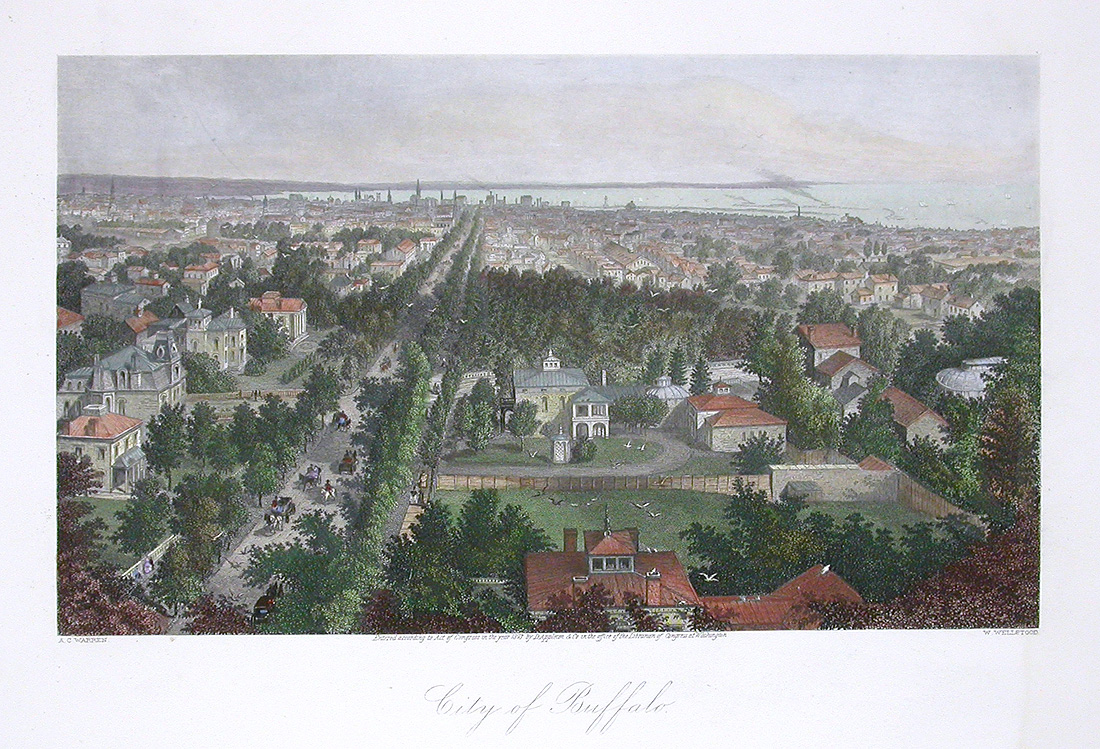
City of Buffalo, 1872

The sudden and unexpected death of General Sullivan A. Meredith occurred in Buffalo, New York, in the evening of Saturday, December 26, 1874. For about a week or ten days he had complained of a pain or troublesome feeling in the region chest, accompanied by some difficulty of respiration, but no apprehension of a serious result was felt, and he was not disabled from attending to business. On Saturday morning, after calling upon his physician, the General proceeded to his own office, where he remained as usual until about 2:30 pm, at which time, his wife coming for him with the family carriage, he returned to his residence, 167 10th Street. After partaking of dinner, about 5 pm, he went to pay a visit to one of his neighbors or friends, who was indisposed or sick. Going home again at 6:30 pm, he took up the evening paper and read for half an hour, when he laid the paper aside, complaining of a return of the pain from which he had previously suffered. He walked out on the verandah for a few moments, and returning seated himself upon a sofa in the library, where, by the bathing of his feet in hot water and the application of mustard paste, some relief was given. In the mean time his wife had sent for the family physician, Dr. Kenyon, who, however was not found. After remaining upon the sofa for a short time he suddenly placed his hand upon his breast, in the region of his heart, and said to his wife, "Here's a new sensation!" His head immediately drooped, his eyes assumed a set expression, and he died, without the utterance of another word, at about 7:45 pm. He left a wife and four children, two sons and two daughters, the eldest nine years of age. Until recently be had been a vestryman of St. Luke's Episcopal church.

== Assessment ==
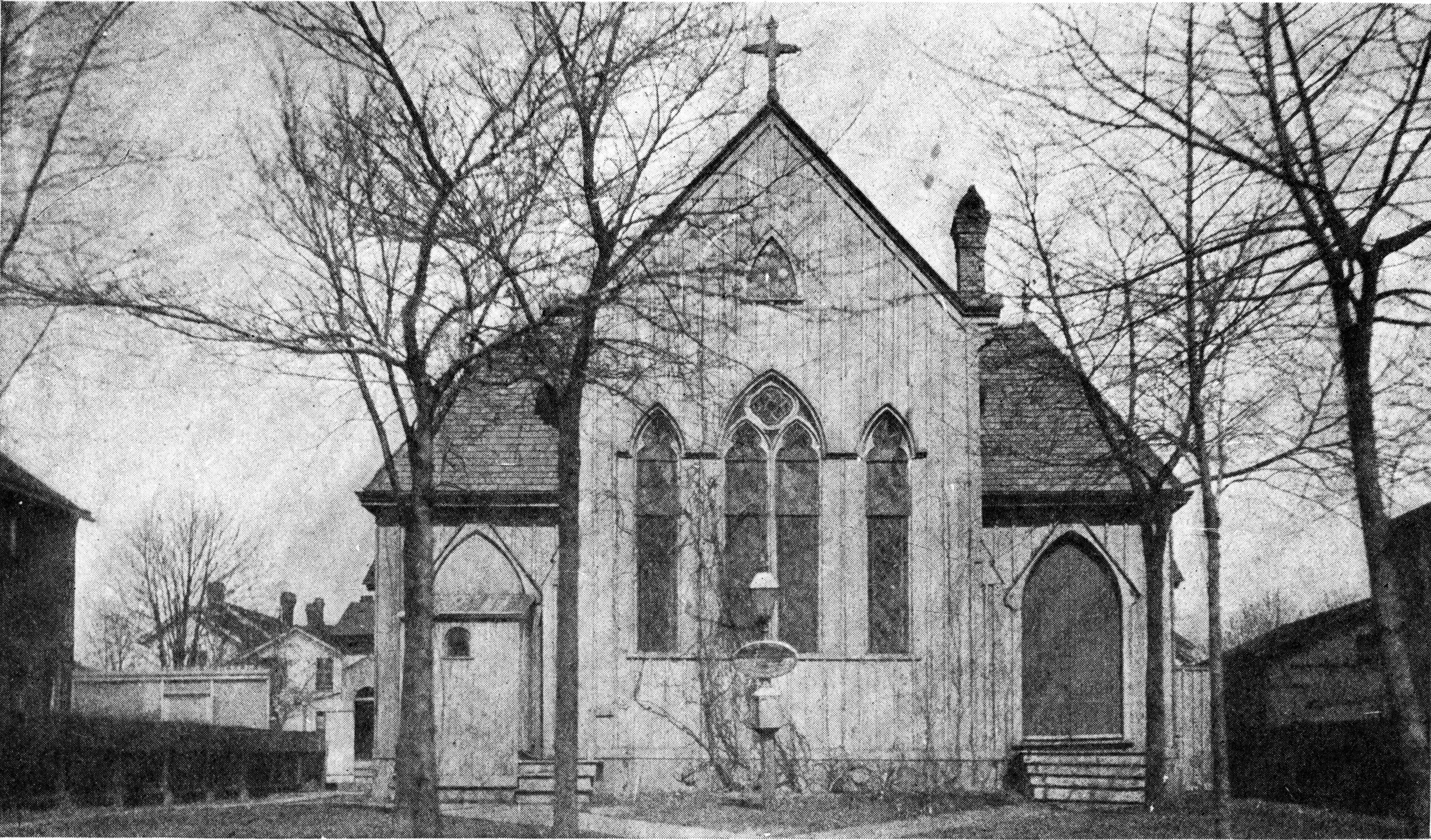
St. Luke's Episcopal Church, Niagara Street, Buffalo, c. 1880s

A correspondent of a western paper, speaking of the Meredith family in connection with the death of William Morris Meredith, thus referred to the death of his brother, Sullivan Amory Meredith:

A younger brother, Sullivan A. Meredith, fell in and took arms at the outbreak of the rebellion and joined the Army to the Shenandoah, whose equal in personnel had scarcely been rallied under any flag since the crusades. Col. Meredith, who subsequently earned the yellow sash, was one of that large body of gallant men who volunteered to remain after their term of service bad expired, to hold for the federal government that old battle ground of nature where the river of swans, reinforced by the Shenandoah, bursts through the Blue Ridge.

The Buffalo Courier of December 28, 1874 gave the following appraisal: "The General has lived an unostentatious life amongst us. He gave all the time necessary to his business, and was more than devoted to his family. He was a man of fine physique, was unusually well-informed and clear-headed, and was a gentleman in the true meaning of that word."

== See also ==
- Second Manassas Union order of battle

== Sources ==
City of Buffalo, 1866

- Warner, Ezra J. (1964). "Sullivan Amory Meredith". Generals in Blue: Lives of the Union Commanders. Baton Rouge: Louisiana State University Press. pp. 320–321.
- "Obituary. Death of Gen. S. A. Meredith". Buffalo Commercial Advertiser. December 28, 1874. p. 3.
- "Obituary. Sudden Death of Gen. S. A. Meredith". Buffalo Courier. December 28, 1874. p. 2.
