= William Hofmann =

Union Army officer (1824–1902)

John William Hofmann
- Born: August 25, 1824; Philadelphia, Pennsylvania, U.S.
- Died: May 10, 1902 (aged 77) Philadelphia, Pennsylvania, U.S.
- Buried: Laurel Hill Cemetery, Philadelphia
- Allegiance: United States (Union)
- Branch: U.S. Army (Union Army)
- Service years: 1861–1865
- Rank: Colonel; Brevet Brigadier General
- Commands: 56th Pennsylvania Infantry Regiment
- Conflicts: Battle of Cedar Mountain; Second Battle of Bull Run; Battle of South Mountain; Battle of Antietam; Battle of Fredericksburg; Battle of Chancellorsville; Battle of Gettysburg; Battle of the Wilderness; Battle of Spotsylvania Court House; Siege of Petersburg

John William Hofmann (August 25, 1824 – May 10, 1902) was an American Union Army officer during the American Civil War. He commanded the 56th Pennsylvania Infantry Regiment and was later brevetted as a brigadier general for gallant service. He fought in major campaigns including Antietam, Gettysburg, and Petersburg.

== Early life ==
John William Hofmann was born in Philadelphia, Pennsylvania, the second son of John Hofmann, a native of Fürth, Germany, who had immigrated to Philadelphia and established himself as a manufacturer of woolen hosiery, supplying the U.S. Army for many years.

== Civil War service ==
Hofmann's military career began in 1840, when he joined the Junior Artillerists of Philadelphia, followed by his enlistment in the Artillery Corps of the Washington Grays in 1843. He served continuously with the Grays until the outbreak of the Civil War in April 1861. Following President Abraham Lincoln's call for 75,000 volunteers, Hofmann initially pledged to serve with the Washington Grays. He was released from that obligation to accept a commission as captain in the First Regiment of Philadelphia City Guards, later designated the 23rd Pennsylvania Infantry Regiment, mustered into federal service for three months.

During this early campaign, Hofmann's company was involved in guarding strategic transportation infrastructure and escorting federal shipments. His company also participated in the suppression of sabotage efforts on railroad bridges in Maryland and later joined General Robert Patterson's Army of the Shenandoah during the 1861 campaign in the Lower Shenandoah Valley. He saw duty at Hoke's Run near Falling Waters, Virginia. Hofmann's company was mustered out of service on July 31, 1861.

Shortly thereafter, Hofmann began raising another company for the reorganized 23rd Pennsylvania Volunteers but was soon offered the position of major in the 56th Pennsylvania Infantry Regiment, then forming under Colonel Sullivan Amory Meredith. He accepted and was later promoted to lieutenant colonel. During the formation of the regiment at Camp Curtin in Harrisburg, he played a key role in organizing and commanding the unit in Meredith's absence from September 1861 to March 1862. The 56th later served in the defenses of Washington, D.C. and along the Lower Potomac, where it undertook guard and logistical duties. Hofmann temporarily commanded the 2nd Brigade of the I Corps’ 1st division while it stayed in reserves at the Battle of Antietam.

Promoted to colonel on January 8, 1863, Hofmann succeeded Meredith, who had been advanced to brigadier general. In July, Hofmann and his unit participated in the Battle of Gettysburg where the 56th fired the first Union infantry volley of the battle. On August 1, 1864, Hofmann was brevetted brigadier general in recognition of his service. He continued to serve in various campaigns and duties without injury or prolonged absence due to illness, remaining with his regiment and brigade throughout their engagements until the expiration of his term of service in 1865.

== Later life and death ==
Following the war, Hofmann returned to ceremonial military duties. On February 22, 1866, at the request of its members, he commanded the Washington Grays during their first postwar parade, marking the anniversary of George Washington's birth. The event included a review by General George G. Meade in front of Philadelphia's Union League.

In May 1869, Hofmann was elected commander of the Second Brigade, First Division, of the Pennsylvania National Guard, serving under Major General Charles M. Prevost. He led the brigade until resigning in August 1871 as part of a planned reorganization. After the consolidation, he was re-elected to command and continued in the post until his final resignation in November 1873.

During the Great Railroad Strike of 1877, Hofmann returned to active duty in a private capacity with the Washington Grays. Serving in the ranks, he took part in deployments to Altoona, Pittsburgh, and Scranton, Pennsylvania.

He died on March 5, 1902, from congestion of the lungs. He is buried in Laurel Hill Cemetery.

== See also ==
- List of American Civil War brevet generals
