= Bob Day (disambiguation) =

Bob Day (born 1952) is a politician and businessman in South Australia, Australia.

Bob Day may also refer to:

- Bob Day (runner) (1944–2012), American long-distance runner
- Bob Day (musician) (1941–2013), half of the British pop duo The Allisons
- Bob Day (police officer), Portland Police Chief
- Bob Day (character), a character in the American sitcom New Girl

== See also ==
- Robert Day (disambiguation)
