= McAlisterville, Pennsylvania =

Unincorporated community in Pennsylvania, US

- Census-designated place
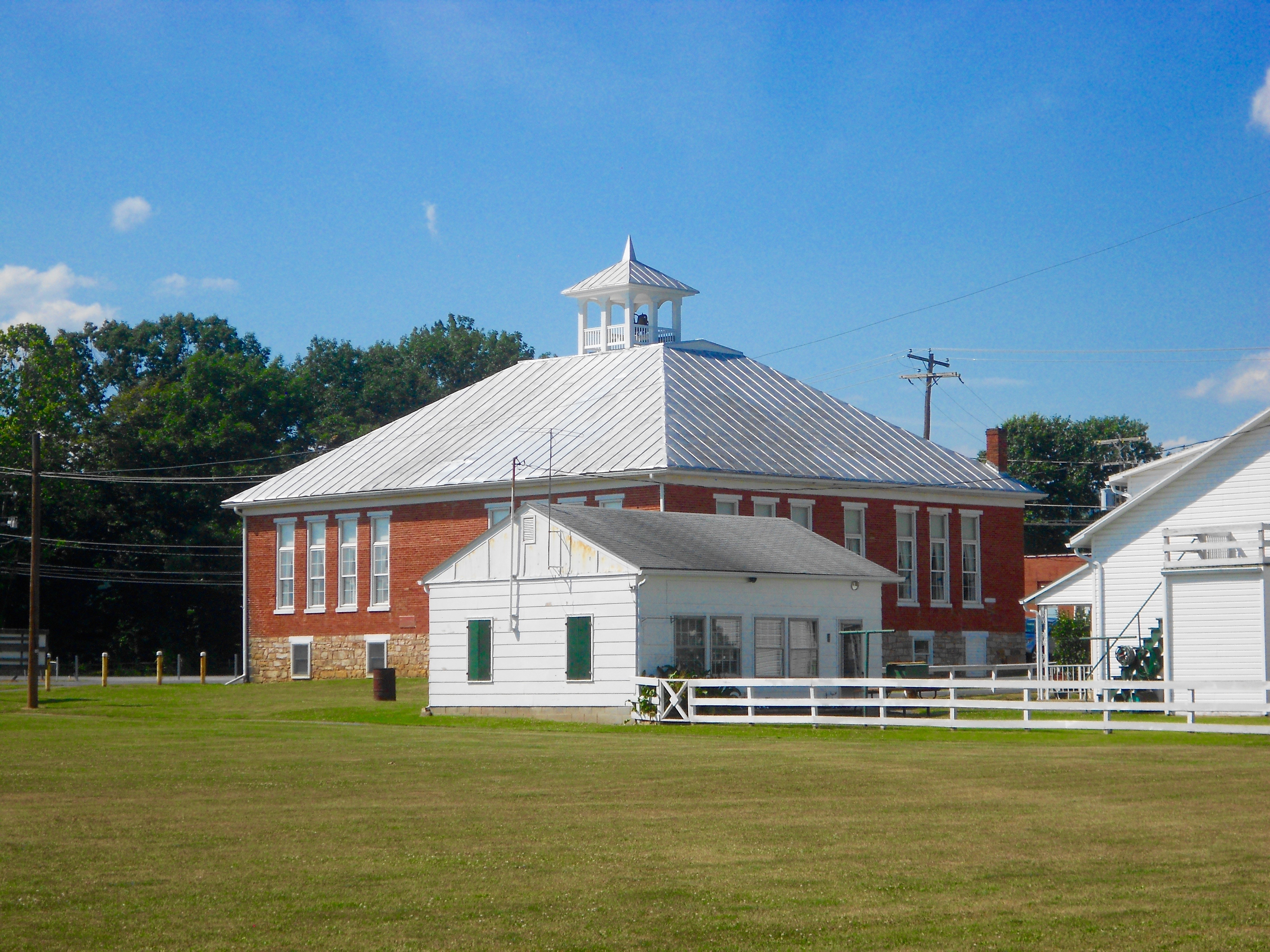
- Old school

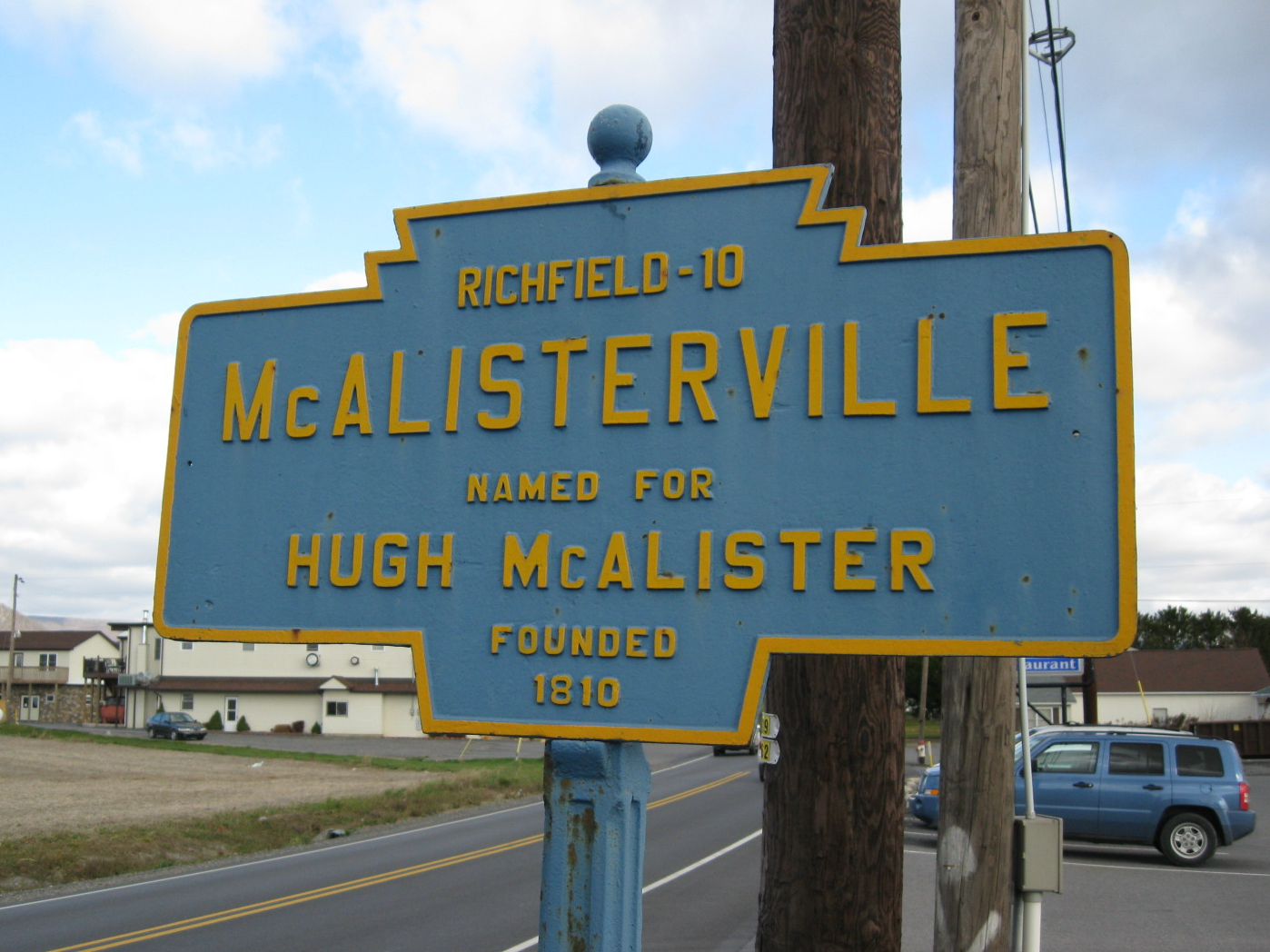
- Keystone Marker

- Location within Pennsylvania Location within the United States
- Coordinates: 40°38′15″N 77°16′27″W
- Country: United States
- State: Pennsylvania
- County: Juniata
- Township: Fayette

Area
  - Total: 1.76 sq mi (4.55 km^{2})
  - Land: 1.76 sq mi (4.55 km^{2})
  - Water: 0 sq mi (0.00 km^{2})
- Elevation: 636 ft (194 m)

Population (2020)
  - Total: 920
  - Density: 524.1/sq mi (202.37/km^{2})
- Time zone: UTC-5 (Eastern (EST))
  - Summer (DST): UTC-4 (EDT)
- ZIP code: 17049
- Area code: 717
- FIPS code: 42-45848
- GNIS feature ID: 1180600

McAlisterville is an unincorporated community and census-designated place (CDP) in Fayette Township, Pennsylvania, United States. The population was 971 at the 2010 census.

== Geography ==
McAlisterville is located in northeastern Juniata County at 40°38′15″N 77°16′27″W (40.637602, -77.274102), in the center of Fayette Township. Pennsylvania Routes 35 and 235 pass through the center of town. PA 35 leads northeast 25 miles (40 km) to Selinsgrove and southwest 8 miles (13 km) to Mifflintown, the Juniata county seat, while PA 235 leads north over Shade Mountain 10 miles (16 km) to Beaver Springs and south 7 miles (11 km) to Thompsontown.

According to the United States Census Bureau, the McAlisterville CDP has a total area of 1.7 square miles (4.5 km^{2}), all land. The community is in the valley of Little Lost Creek, a westward-flowing tributary of Lost Creek, which in turn is a tributary of the Juniata River.

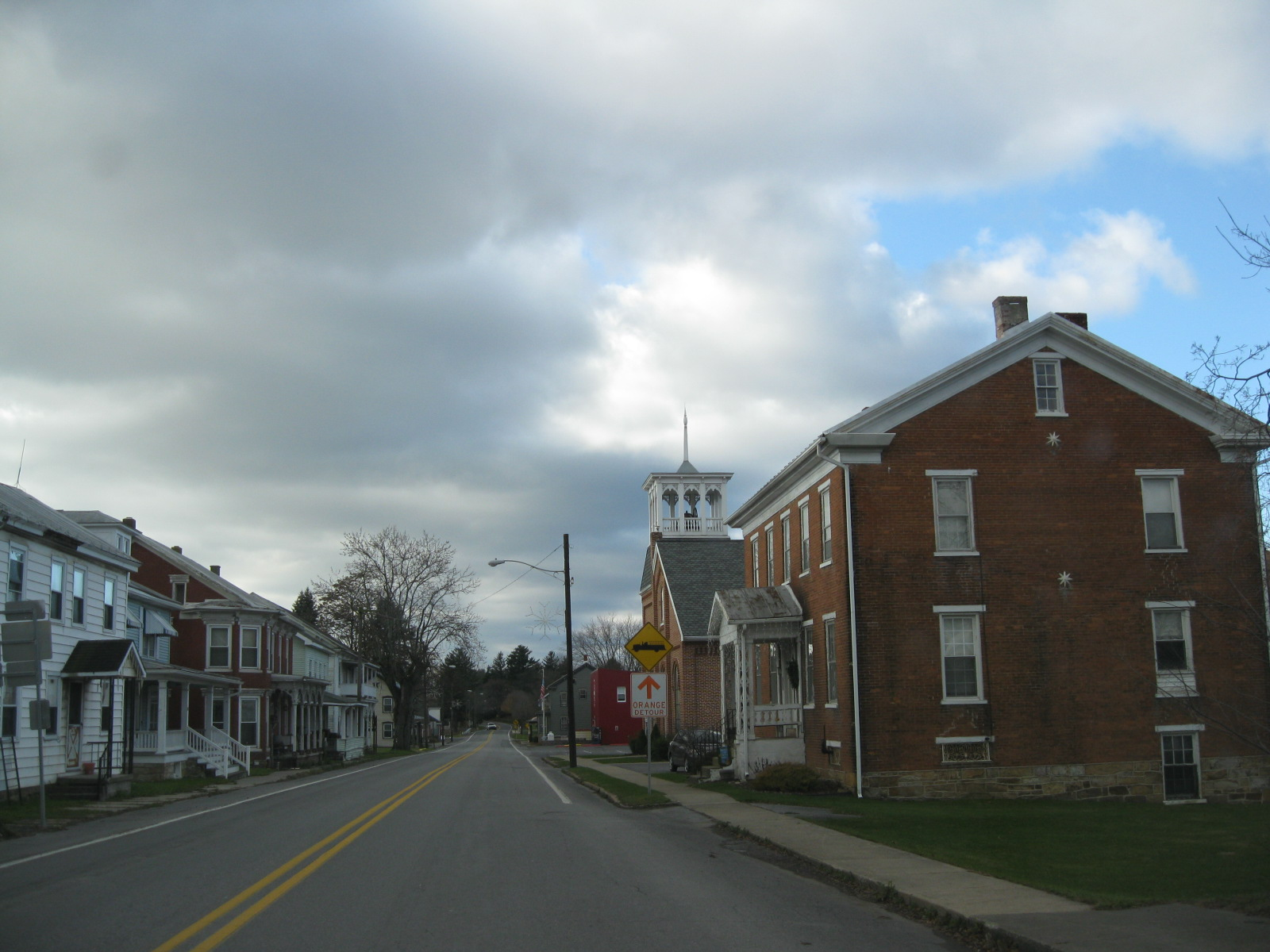
Downtown McAlisterville

== Demographics ==
Historical population
Census	Pop.	Note	%±
2020	920		—
U.S. Decennial Census

As of the census of 2000, there were 765 people, 337 households, and 209 families residing in the CDP. The population density was 818.2 inhabitants per square mile (315.9/km^{2}). There were 366 housing units at an average density of 391.4 per square mile (151.1/km^{2}). The racial makeup of the CDP was 99.08% White, 0.39% African American, 0.26% from other races, and 0.26% from two or more races. Hispanic or Latino of any race were 0.65% of the population.

There were 337 households, out of which 26.4% had children under the age of 18 living with them, 49.9% were married couples living together, 8.6% had a female householder with no husband present, and 37.7% were non-families. 34.1% of all households were made up of individuals, and 14.5% had someone living alone who was 65 years of age or older. The average household size was 2.27 and the average family size was 2.91.

In the CDP, the population was spread out, with 23.3% under the age of 18, 11.0% from 18 to 24, 26.8% from 25 to 44, 19.9% from 45 to 64, and 19.1% who were 65 years of age or older. The median age was 37 years. For every 100 females, there were 83.5 males. For every 100 females age 18 and over, there were 84.0 males.

The median income for a household in the CDP was $23,047, and the median income for a family was $32,411. Males had a median income of $25,893 versus $22,120 for females. The per capita income for the CDP was $16,821. About 13.7% of families and 12.8% of the population were below the poverty line, including 7.3% of those under age 18 and none of those age 65 or over.

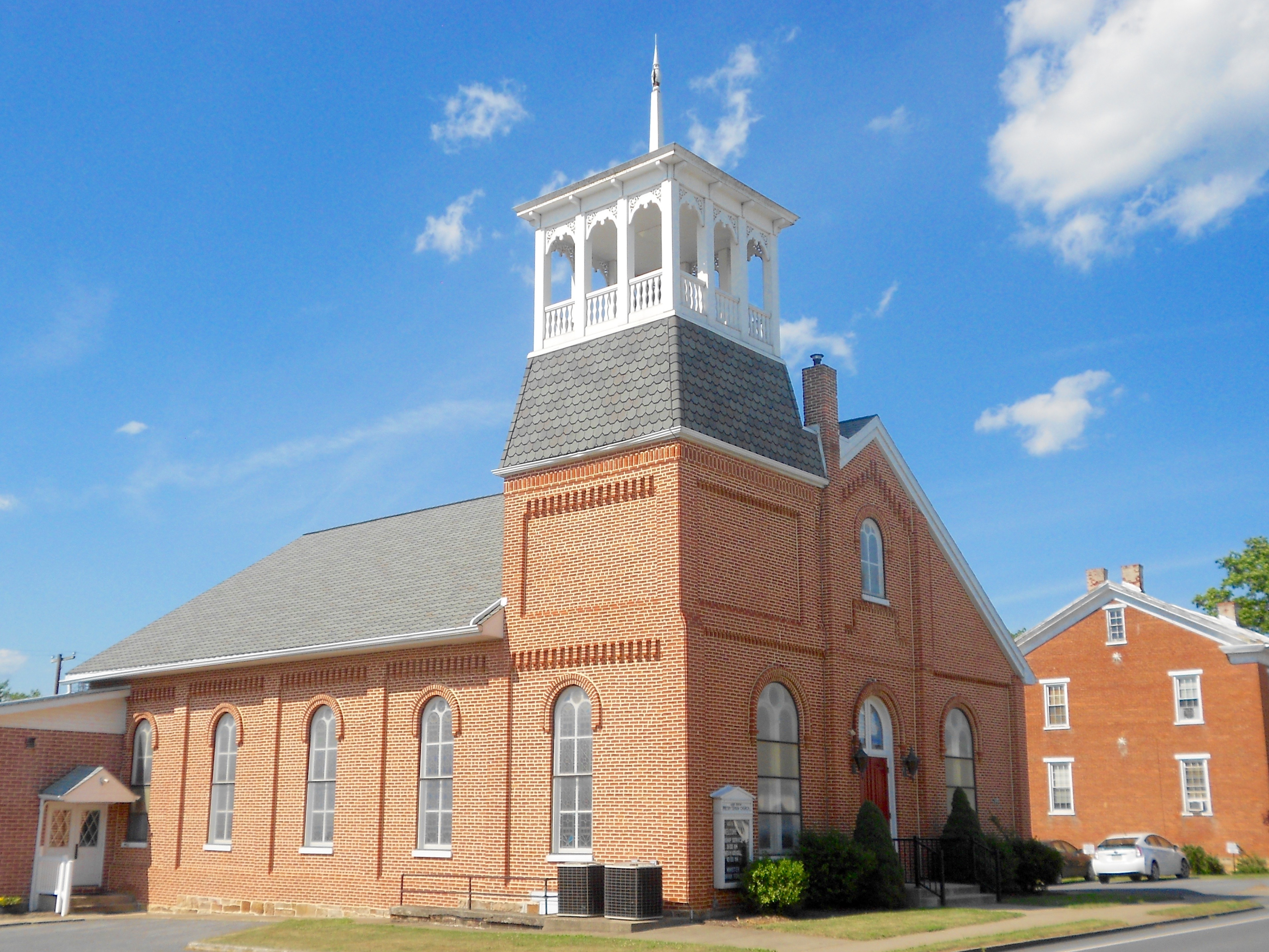
Lost Creek Presbyterian Church in 2016

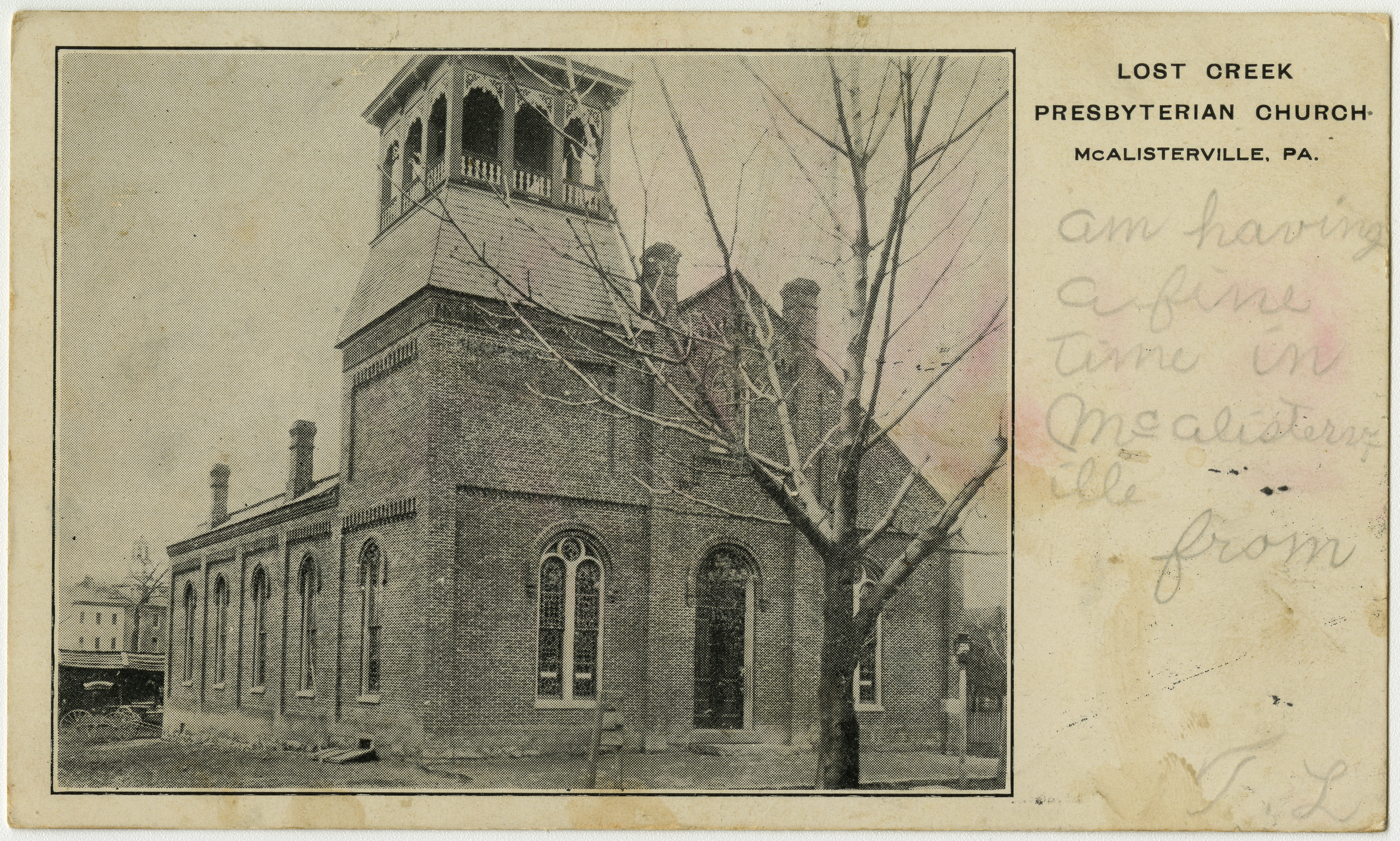
Lost Creek Presbyterian Church on an old postcard

== Businesses and schools ==
McAlisterville is home to several locally owned businesses.

Schools within McAlisterville are East Juniata High School, Fayette Township Elementary, and Juniata Christian School.

Fire protection is provided by the Fayette Fire Company. The workers in the fire company are all volunteers and recognizes all who give their time or monetary gifts to continue service.

Ambulance service provided by Fayette Township EMS, Inc., which is entirely staffed by volunteers.

== Notable people ==
McAlisterville is the boyhood home of radio personality Nelson Lauver of The American Storyteller Radio Journal. Nelson is also the author of "Most Unlikely to Succeed."

Medal of Honor recipient and Civil War veteran Robert W. Ammerman died in, and is buried in, McAlisterville.

Educator George F. McFarland lived in McAlisterville and was superintendent of the McAlisterville Academy prior to the Civil War. McFarland organized local volunteers for Union military service in 1862. He served with distinction and commanded the 151st Pennsylvania Infantry at the Battle of Gettysburg.

Miriam [Smith] Wetzel, 1952 Miss Pennsylvania, is from McAlisterville. Miriam went on to become an educator and author.
