= James T. Kirk (Union officer) =

James Thompson Kirk (September 21, 1826 – December 7, 1886) was a Pennsylvania merchant and then an officer in the Union Army during the American Civil War. He was the second officer to hold the title of colonel in the 10th Pennsylvania Reserve Regiment.

== Biography ==
Kirk was born in Canonsburg, Pennsylvania, a son of George A. and Jane (Thompson) Kirk. He was educated in the common schools and then became a merchant tailor. In 1851, he moved to Washington, Pennsylvania, where he owned and operated a retail store.

Kirk enlisted in the Army shortly after the outbreak of the Civil War and was commissioned in June 1861 as the captain of Company D of the 10th Pennsylvania Reserves (also known as the 39th Pennsylvania Infantry). Three weeks later, he became the regiment's lieutenant colonel. He saw his first combat in the Battle of Dranesville in Northern Virginia, on December 20, 1861.

When Colonel John S. McCalmont resigned in May 1862, Kirk was promoted to colonel. He commanded the regiment during the battles of Beaver Dam Creek, Gaines Mill, Glendale and Second Bull Run. In the first three actions, the regiment belonged to the 3rd Brigade of the 3rd Division of Maj. Gen. Fitz-John Porter's V Corps. At Second Bull Run, it fought with the 3rd Brigade of John F. Reynolds's independent division. He briefly led the brigade before being wounded and out of action. As a result of his injuries, he missed the battles of South Mountain and Antietam. When it became evident that his wounds would prevent any further field duty, he resigned from the army on October 18, 1862.

Following the war, Kirk resumed his mercantile business. He died at the age of 60 in Washington, Pennsylvania.
