= 56th Pennsylvania Infantry Regiment =

Union Army infantry regiment

56th Pennsylvania Volunteer Infantry
- State flag of Pennsylvania showing the state coat of arms on top of a blue background
- Active: 1861 – July 1, 1865
- Country: United States of America
- Allegiance: Union
- Branch: Infantry
- Engagements: Battle of Groveton; Second Battle of Bull Run; Battle of South Mountain; Battle of Antietam; Battle of Fredericksburg; Battle of Chancellorsville; Battle of Brandy Station; Battle of Gettysburg; Bristoe Campaign; Mine Run Campaign; Battle of the Wilderness; Battle of Spotsylvania Court House; Battle of North Anna; Battle of Cold Harbor; Siege of Petersburg; Battle of Globe Tavern; Battle of Peebles' Farm; Battle of Boydton Plank Road; Battle of Hatcher's Run; Appomattox Campaign; Battle of Five Forks; Battle of Appomattox Court House

Commanders
- Colonel: Sullivan Amory Meredith
- Colonel: John William Hofmann
- Colonel: Henry A. Laycock

Insignia
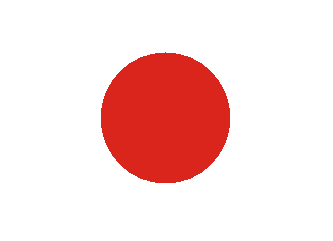
- 1st Division, I Corps

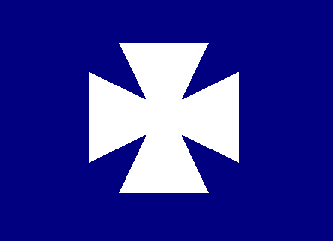
- 2nd Division, V Corps

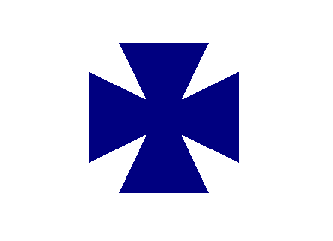
- 3rd Division, V Corps

The 56th Pennsylvania Volunteer Infantry was an infantry regiment that served in the Union Army during the American Civil War. The unit has the distinction of being the first Union Army infantry regiment to open fire at the Battle of Gettysburg.

== Service ==
The 56th Pennsylvania Infantry was organized at Camp Curtin in Harrisburg, Pennsylvania in Fall 1861 and mustered in March 6, 1862 for a three-year enlistment under the command of Colonel Sullivan Amory Meredith.

The regiment was attached to Defenses of Washington to May 1862. Doubleday's Brigade, Department of the Rappahannock, to June 1862. 2nd Brigade, 3rd Division, III Corps, Army of Virginia, to September 1862. 2nd Brigade, 1st Division, I Corps, Army of the Potomac, to March 1864. 3rd Brigade, 2nd Division, V Corps, Army of the Potomac, to September 1864. 3rd Brigade, 3rd Division, V Corps, to July 1865.

The 56th Pennsylvania Infantry mustered out July 1, 1865 in Philadelphia, Pennsylvania.

== Detailed service ==
Left Pennsylvania for Washington, D.C., March 8. Duty at Fort Albany, defenses of Washington, until April 4, 1862, and at Budd's Ferry until April 24. At Aquia Creek Landing until May 10. Guarded the railroad bridge at Potomac Creek May 21–27. (Five companies moved to Belle Plains May 10.) Guard duty near Fredericksburg until August 9. Pope's Campaign in northern Virginia August 16 – September 2. Battles of Gainesville August 28; Groveton August 29; Bull Run August 30. Maryland Campaign September 6–24. Battles of South Mountain September 14; Antietam September 16–17. Duty on the battlefield of Antietam until October 20. (Company A at Fairfax October 20–30.) At Bakersville October 20–30. Movement to Falmouth, Va., October 30 – November 19. Union, Va., November 2–3. Battle of Fredericksburg December 12–15. Burnside's 2nd Campaign, "Mud March," January 20–24, 1863. At Falmouth and Belle Plains until April 27, 1863. Chancellorsville Campaign April 27 – May 6. Operations at Pollock's Mill Creek April 29 – May 2. Fitzhugh's Crossing April 29–30. Chancellorsville May 2–5. Brandy Station and Beverly Ford June 9. Gettysburg Campaign June 11 – July 24. Battle of Gettysburg, July 1–3. Pursuit of Lee July 5–24. Duty on line of the Rappahannock until October. Bristoe Campaign October 9–22. Advance to line of the Rappahannock November 7–8. Mine Run Campaign November 26 – December 2. Demonstration on the Rapidan February 6–7, 1864. Veterans on furlough March 10 – April 17. Rapidan Campaign May 4 – June 12. Battles of the Wilderness May 5–7; Laurel Hill May 8; Spotsylvania May 8–12; Spotsylvania Court House May 12–21. Assault on the Salient May 12. North Anna River May 23–26. Jericho Ford May 25. Totopotomoy May 28–31. Cold Harbor June 1–12. Bethesda Church June 1–3. Before Petersburg June 16–18. Siege of Petersburg June 16, 1864 to April 2, 1865. Mine Explosion, Petersburg, July 30, 1864 (reserve). Weldon Railroad August 18–21. Poplar Springs Church September 29 – October 2. Boydton Plank Road, Hatcher's Run, October 27–28. Warren's Raid on Weldon Railroad December 7–12. Dabney's Mills, Hatcher's Run, February 5–7, 1865. Appomattox Campaign March 28 – April 9. Lewis Farm near Gravelly Run March 29. Boydton and White Oak Road March 31. Five Forks April 1. Fall of Petersburg April 2. Appomattox Court House April 9. Surrender of Lee and his army. March to Washington, D.C., May 2–12. Grand Review of the Armies May 23.

== Casualties ==
The regiment lost a total of 215 men during service; 7 officers and 111 enlisted men killed or mortally wounded, 1 officer and 96 enlisted men died of disease.

== Commanders ==
- Colonel Sullivan Amory Meredith
- Colonel John William Hofmann
- Colonel Henry A. Laycock
- Lieutenant Colonel George B. Osborn – commanded during the Bristoe Campaign
- Major John T. Jack – commanded at the Battle of Globe Tavern
- Captain Frederick Williams – commanded at the Battle of Antietam

== Notable members ==
- Captain Robert H. Day (soldier)
- Private James T. Jennings, Company K – Medal of Honor recipient for action at the Battle of Globe Tavern

== See also ==
- List of Pennsylvania Civil War Units
- Pennsylvania in the Civil War
