= Robert H. Day (soldier) =

United States military officer

Robert Henry Day (Sep. 25, 1835, Bridgewater Township, Susquehanna County, Pennsylvania. Death: Jan. 11, 1929, Roanoke City, Virginia) was an officer in the United States military during the American Civil War, railroad engineer and electrical engineer in Roanoke, Virginia.

== Early life ==
His parents were Henry and Ann Eliza (Wright) Day, and he was born in Bridgewater Township, Susquehanna County, Pennsylvania. His siblings include his eldest sister, Martha M. Day Fordyce, his younger brothers: Isaac W. Day, Charles M. Day, Daniel R. Day, and his youngest sister, Ludora C. Day Smith. He married Velona Louise Taylor Day (1841–1921), and their son was Arthur Taylor Day (1874 - 1939).

"Robert was apprenticed to the Erie Railroad in 1849 as a machinist for a term of three years. In 1852 he was promoted to Fireman and twenty-one months later he became a full-fledged Locomotive Engineer. In 1858 Robert resigned from the Erie Railroad and taking Horace Greeley's advice went west in search of work in his chosen field. After spending a short time in Texas he migrated to the city of New Orleans where he became connected with the Tallert and Bro's Company, which was headquartered in Richmond, Virginia, building stationary engines for Grist Mills and Cotton Gins."

== Civil War ==
He was promoted from 1st Sgt. to 2nd Lt. in September 1862, and was severely wounded at the Battle of Second Manassas (Bull Run). Following a long period of recovery he rejoined his unit and was promoted to 1st Lt. on March 1, 1863. Robert Day was promoted to captain of the 56th Pennsylvania Infantry on June 13, 1863, and a few weeks later he was captured on July 1, 1863, on the first day of the Battle of Gettysburg. He was imprisoned with other Union officers in the infamous Libby Prison in Richmond, Virginia.

Captain Day was part of the famous Libby Prison Escape, bu was later recaptured after tunnelling out of the prison. "In 1864, he was re-captured after making it 1 mile from Union territory after tunneling out of the prison. Through the years, he kept up with his fellow escapees through the Libby Tunnel Prison Association." When he died in 1929, he was the last surviving member of the organization. Captain Day was one of the leaders of an escape from Libby in February 1864 but was recaptured and sent to several Confederate Prisoner of War Camps in Georgia and the Carolina's. Only with the arrival of General William Tecumseh Sherman's army in the Carolina's was Captain Day freed from captivity and he was discharged from the Union Army on January 10, 1865. "Discharged the 10th of June 1865, he had served the Union with distinction and received several citations for gallantry."

== Engineer ==
In 1882 Robert Day accepted the position of Road Foreman for the newly created Norfolk and Western Railway on the Shenandoah line and relocated his family to Roanoke, formerly known as Big Lick and quickly became active in local civics and economic development and distinguished himself a leader in several national organizations of that era. He was a member of the Grand Army of the Republic, a Civil War Veterans group, which sought to assist the wives and orphans of Union Soldiers and played an increasingly powerful role in national politics. "In 1882, he became the first road foreman hired by the Norfolk & Western Railroad. An honorary member of the Brotherhood of Locomotive Engineers, he became Superintendent of the Roanoke Streetcar Company and was present on its first run in which two mules pulled the streetcar."

"Major R. H. Day, manager of the Roanoke Electric and Power Company, has gone to Union, New York, to attend a reunion of his family. His venerable mother is about 84 years of age and his brother, Charles M. Day, a chief draughtsman of the Union Pacific Railroad, he has not seen for several years. He anticipates much pleasure from this reunion, probably the last without broken ranks, he will ever enjoy".

== Organizations ==
- Brotherhood of Locomotive Engineers. He joined in 1865 and became an honorary member after 1911.
- Grand Army of the Republic
- Libby Tunnel Prison Association
- Virginia Gun Club

== Death and burial ==
He died in Roanoke, and is buried at the Evergreen Cemetery.

== Legacy ==
"Robert Day lived in the City of Roanoke for fifty (50) years and was considered one of its oldest citizens. He outlived his Libby Prison comrades. Day Avenue in Old Southwest was named in his honor."

In 2015, the Sons of Union Veterans of the Civil War had a Memorial Day and grave decoration service for him.

"The Joshua L. Chamberlain Camp #20 Sons of Union Veterans of the Civil War Roanoke, VA honored Major Robert H. Day in a ceremony and memorial service 10 a.m. Saturday, May 23, 2015 at Evergreen Burial Park. The Honorable David A. Bowers, Mayor of the City of Roanoke issued a Proclamation proclaiming the day as Robert Henry Day's Day."

The keynote address at the grave decoration ceremony was given by Mark R. Day.
