= 10th Pennsylvania Reserve Regiment =

Union Army infantry regiment

10th Pennsylvania Reserve Regiment (39th Pennsylvania Volunteer Infantry)
- Active: June 3, 1861 to June 11, 1864
- Country: United States
- Allegiance: Union
- Branch: Infantry
- Engagements: Battle of Dranesville; Seven Days Battles; Battle of Mechanicsville; Battle of Gaines's Mill; Battle of Savage's Station; Battle of Glendale; Battle of Malvern Hill; Second Battle of Bull Run; Battle of South Mountain; Battle of Antietam; Battle of Fredericksburg; Battle of Gettysburg; Bristoe Campaign; Mine Run Campaign; Battle of the Wilderness; Battle of Spotsylvania Court House; Battle of Cold Harbor

The 10th Pennsylvania Reserve Regiment also known as the 39th Pennsylvania Volunteer Infantry was an infantry regiment that served in the Union Army as part of the Pennsylvania Reserves infantry division during the American Civil War.

== Organization ==
Company	Moniker	Primary Location of Recruitment	Captains
A	The Somerset Infantry	Somerset County	Robert P. Cummins
B	The Middlesex Rangers	Mercer County	Thomas McConnell
C	The Venango Greys	Venango County	Christopher M. Over
D	The Jefferson Light Guards	Washington County	Charles W. McDaniel
E	The Clarion River Guards	Clarion County	James B. Knox
F	The Curtin Rifles	Beaver County	Milo R. Adams
G	The Mercer Rifles	Mercer County	Adoniram J. Warner
H	The Warren Guards	Warren County	Henry V. Patridge
I	The Allegheny College Volunteers	Crawford County	Ira Ayer Jr.
K	The Wilson Rifles	Beaver County	Samuel Miller

== Service ==
The 10th Pennsylvania Reserves was organized at Camp Wilkins near Pittsburgh, Pennsylvania beginning June 3, 1861 and mustered on July 21, 1861 under the command of Colonel John S. McCalmont.

The regiment was attached to 3rd Brigade, McCall's Pennsylvania Reserves Division, Army of the Potomac, to March 1862. 3rd Brigade, 2nd Division, I Corps, Army of the Potomac, to April 1862. 3rd Brigade, McCall's Division, Department of the Rappahannock, to June 1862. 3rd Brigade, 3rd Division, V Corps, Army of the Potomac, to August 1862. 3rd Brigade, 3rd Division, III Corps, Army of Virginia, to September 1862. 3rd Brigade, 3rd Division, I Corps, Army of the Potomac, to February 1863. 3rd Brigade, Pennsylvania Reserves Division, XXII Corps, Department of Washington, to June 1863. 3rd Brigade, 3rd Division, V Corps, Army of the Potomac, to June 1864.

The 10th Pennsylvania Reserves mustered out June 11, 1864.

== Detailed service ==
Ordered to Harrisburg, Pa., July 18. Moved to Baltimore, Md., July 22; then to Washington, D.C., July 24. At Tennallytown, Md., August 1 to October 10, 1861, and at Camp Pierpont, near Langley, Va., until March 1862. Expedition to Gunnell's Mills December 6, 1861. Action at Dranesville December 20. Advance on Manassas, Va., March 10–15, 1862. McDowell's advance on Falmouth April 9–19. Duty at Fredericksburg until June. Moved to White House June 9–12. Seven Days before Richmond June 25-July 1. Battles of Mechanicsville June 26, Gaines's Mill June 27, Charles City Cross Roads and Glendale June 30, Malvern Hill July 1. At Harrison's Landing until August 16. Movement to join Pope August 16–26. Battle of Gainesville August 28. Battle of Groveton August 29. Second Battle of Bull Run August 30. Maryland Campaign September 6–24. Battle of South Mountain, Md., September 14. Battle of Antietam September 16–17. Duty in Maryland until October 30. Movement to Falmouth, Va., October 30-November 19. Battle of Fredericksburg December 12–15. "Mud March" January 20–24, 1863. Ordered to Washington, D.C., February 6, and duty there and at Alexandria until June 25. Ordered to join the Army of the Potomac in the field. Battle of Gettysburg, July 1–3. Pursuit of Lee July 5–24. Bristoe Campaign October 9–22. Advance to line of the Rappahannock November 7–8. Rappahannock Station November 7. Mine Run Campaign November 26-December 2. Bristoe Station April 15, 1864 (detachment). Rapidan Campaign May 4–31. Battle of the Wilderness May 5–7, Laurel Hill May 8, Spotsylvania May 8–12, and Spotsylvania Court House May 12–21. Assault on the Salient May 12. Harris Farm May 19. North Anna River May 23–26. Jericho Ford May 25. On line of the Totopotomoy May 28–31. Left the front May 31, 1864.

== Casualties ==
The regiment lost a total of 207 men during service; 7 officers and 153 enlisted men killed or mortally wounded, 47 enlisted men died of disease.

== Commanders ==
- Colonel John S. McCalmont - resigned May 9, 1862
- Colonel James Thompson Kirk - resigned October 18, 1862
- Colonel Adoniram Judson Warner - transferred to 17th Regiment Veteran Reserve Corps Infantry, November 23, 1863
- Lieutenant Colonel Ira Ayer Jr. - served as brevet colonel until muster out
- Major James B. Knox - commanded at the Battle of Fredericksburg
- Captain Jonathan P. Smith - commanded at the Battle of Antietam after Ltc. Warner was wounded in action

== See also ==
- List of Pennsylvania Civil War Units
- Pennsylvania in the Civil War
