= List of bridges on the National Register of Historic Places in Pennsylvania =

External videos
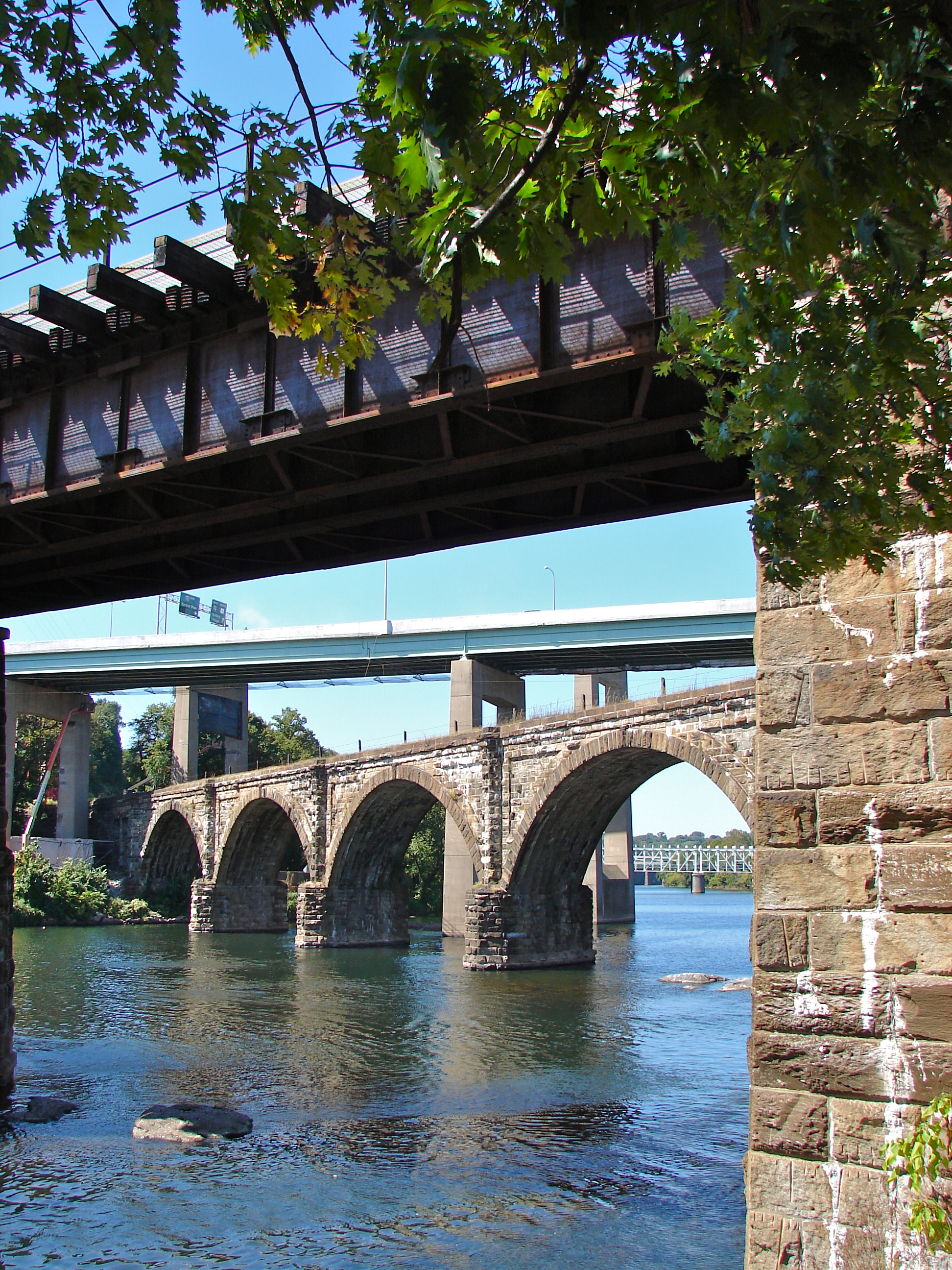
- Pennsylvania's Historic Bridges: Connecting our Past and Future, 23:33, Pennsylvania Historical and Museum Commission

This is a list of bridges and tunnels on the National Register of Historic Places (NRHP) in the U.S. state of Pennsylvania. Covered bridges on the NRHP in Pennsylvania are listed elsewhere.

== Current listings ==
Name	Image	Built	Listed	Location	County	Type
Adams Avenue Bridge in Philadelphia	Adams Avenue Bridge	1901	June 22, 1988	Philadelphia; Adams Avenue across Tacony Creek; 40°2′31″N 75°6′48″W	Philadelphia	Multi-span stone arch
Allenwood River Bridge		1895	June 22, 1988	Allenwood, Union; 41°6′28″N 76°53′25″W	Northumberland, Union	Pratt through truss
Armstrong Tunnel		1926, 1927	January 7, 1986	Pittsburgh; 40°26′5″N 79°59′25″W	Allegheny	
Askew Bridge		1857	March 1, 1973	Reading; 40°20′37″N 75°55′34″W	Berks	
Atkinson Road Bridge		1873	March 20, 2002	Solebury Twp; 40°19′38″N 74°58′44″W	Bucks	Three-span arch
Baker Bridge		1917	March 20, 1990	Newburg; 40°17′10″N 78°7′17″W	Huntingdon	Concrete arch
Barto Bridge		1908	June 22, 1988	Barto; 40°23′46″N 75°36′31″W	Berks	Single-span barrel arch
Belmont Avenue Bridge in Philadelphia	Interior of Belmont Ave. Bridge	1896	June 22, 1988	Philadelphia; 39°59′36″N 75°13′6″W	Philadelphia	Single-span stone arch
Birmingham Bridge	Birmingham Bridge	1898	March 20, 1990	Birmingham; 40°38′56″N 78°11′57″W	Huntingdon	Pratt through truss
Black Rock Bridge		1927	June 22, 1988	Mont Clare; 40°9′32″N 75°30′44″W	Chester, Montgomery	Multi-span spandrel arch
W. Bollman and Company Bridge		1871	November 8, 1978	Meyersdale; 39°49′48″N 79°2′34″W	Somerset	Warren truss
Bridge 182+42, Northern Central Railway		ca. 1871	May 4, 1995	Glen Rock; 39°46′39″N 76°43′25″W	York	Masonry arch
Bridge 5+92, Northern Central Railway		1900	May 4, 1995	Seven Valleys; 39°51′15″N 76°46′18″W	York	Girder
Bridge 634, Northern Central Railway		ca. 1871	May 4, 1995	Railroad; 39°46′23″N 76°43′14″W	York	Masonry arch
Bridge between East Manchester and Newberry Townships		1889	May 10, 1988	Conewago Heights	York	Pennsylvania (petit) truss
Bridge between Guilford and Hamilton Townships			June 22, 1988	Social Island; 39°53′9″N 77°42′48″W	Franklin	Multi-span stone arch
Bridge between Madison and Mahoning Townships	Bridge between Madison and Mahoning Townships	1895	June 22, 1988	Deanville; 40°55′52″N 79°23′18″W	Armstrong	Solid spandrel arch
Bridge between Monroe and Penn Townships	Bridge between Monroe and Penn Townships	1919	June 22, 1988	Selinsgrove; 40°49′32″N 76°52′17″W	Snyder	Multi-span barrel arch
Bridge in Albany Township	Bridge in Albany Township	1841	June 22, 1988	Steinsville; 40°38′7″N 75°51′21″W	Berks	Multiple span stone arch
Bridge in Bangor Borough	Bridge in Bangor Borough	1915	June 22, 1988	Bangor; 40°52′10″N 75°12′28″W	Northampton	
Bridge in Brown Township		1890	June 22, 1988	Hillborn; 41°29′43″N 77°29′51″W	Lycoming	Lattice truss
Wycombe Stone Bridge		1905	June 22, 1988	Wycombe; 40°16′53″N 75°1′19″W	Bucks	Multi-span stone arch
Bridge in Cherrytree Township		1882	June 22, 1988	Titusville; 41°37′2″N 79°39′27″W	Venango	Pratt through truss
Bridge in City of Wilkes-Barre	Bridge in the City of Wilkes-Barre	1885	June 22, 1988	Wilkes-Barre; 41°15′36″N 75°52′2″W	Luzerne	Single-span stone arch
Bridge in Clinton Township		1887	June 22, 1988	Kennerdell; 41°14′17″N 79°51′16″W	Venango	Pratt through truss
Bridge in Cumberland Township	Bridge in Cumberland Township	1894	June 22, 1988	Greenmount; 39°45′27″N 77°17′6″W	Adams	Three truss
Bridge in Dreher Township	Bridge in Dreher Township	1934	June 22, 1988	Haags Mill; 41°17′17″N 75°19′52″W	Wayne	High-rise stone arch
Bridge in East Fallowfield Township		1894	June 22, 1988	Atlantic; 41°32′6″N 80°20′14″W	Crawford	Pratt through truss; et al.
Bridge in East Fallowfield Township		ca. 1826	June 22, 1988	Mortonville; 39°56′46″N 75°46′43″W	Chester	
Bridge in Fishing Creek Township	Bridge in Fishing Creek Township	1915	June 22, 1988	Bendertown; 41°9′5″N 76°17′45″W	Columbia	Open-spandrel arch
Bridge in Franconia Township		1837	June 22, 1988	Elvoy; 40°17′18″N 75°20′20″W	Montgomery	Multi-span stone arch
Bridge in Franklin Township	Bridge in Franklin Township	1919, 1920	June 22, 1988	Morrisville; 39°53′37″N 80°10′47″W	Greene	Open-spandrel arch
Bridge in French Creek Township		1898	June 22, 1988	Carlton; 41°28′17″N 80°1′7″W	Mercer	Pratt through truss
Bridge in Gibson Borough	Bridge in Gibson Borough		June 22, 1988	South Gibson; 41°44′32″N 75°37′51″W	Susquehanna	Primitive corbelled arch
Bridge in Greenwood Township	Bridge in Greenwood Township	1892	June 22, 1988	Bells Landing; 40°54′39″N 78°38′51″W	Clearfield	Pratt through truss
Bridge in Hatfield Township	Bridge in Hatfield Township	1874	June 22, 1988	Unionville; 40°17′2″N 75°16′23″W	Montgomery	Multi-span stone arch
Bridge in Heidelberg Township		ca. 1887	June 22, 1988	Germansville; 40°42′3″N 75°42′37″W	Lehigh	Single-span stone arch
Bridge in Jefferson Borough		1901	June 22, 1988	Cochrans Mill; 40°17′34.48″N 79°58′12.75″W	Allegheny	Single-span stone arch
Bridge in Jenner Township	Bridge in Jenner Township	1908	June 22, 1988	Pilltown; 40°10′18″N 79°0′49″W	Somerset	Single-span stone arch
Bridge in Johnstown City	Bridge in Johnstown City	1890	June 22, 1988	Johnstown; 40°19′36″N 78°55′39″W	Cambria	Pennsylvania (petit) truss
Bridge in Lewis Township		1890	June 22, 1988	Bodines; 41°26′54″N 76°58′52″W	Lycoming	Pratt through truss
Bridge in Lykens Township No. 1	Bridge in Lykens Township No. 1		June 22, 1988	Edman; 40°38′38″N 76°41′34″W	Dauphin	Multi-span stone arch
Bridge in Lykens Township No. 2	Bridge in Lykens Township No. 2	1872	June 22, 1988	Fearnot; 40°37′58″N 76°39′52″W	Dauphin	Single-span stone arch
Bridge in Metal Township	Bridge in Metal Township	1907	June 22, 1988	Willow Hill; 40°7′13″N 77°46′39″W	Franklin	Camelback-shaped arch
Bridge in Newport Borough	Bridge in Newport Borough	1929	June 22, 1988	Newport; 40°28′27″N 77°7′48″W	Perry	Multi-span stone arch
Bridge in Nicholson Township		1876	June 22, 1988	Starkville; 41°36′17″N 75°49′24″W	Wyoming	Lenticular truss
Bridge in Oil Creek Township		1896	June 22, 1988	Titusville; 41°37′46″N 79°42′10″W	Crawford	Pratt through truss
Bridge in Portage Township	Bridge in Portage Township	1832	June 22, 1988	Oil City; 40°24′8″N 78°38′22″W	Cambria	Circular arch
Bridge in Porter Township		1889	June 22, 1988	Jersey Shore; 41°10′51″N 77°16′43″W	Lycoming	Lenticular truss
Bridge in Radnor Township No. 1		1905	June 22, 1988	Broomall; 40°0′13″N 75°22′19″W	Delaware	Multi-span stone arch
Bridge in Radnor Township No. 2		1905	June 22, 1988	Villanova; 40°0′41″N 75°20′39″W	Delaware	Single-span stone arch
Bridge in Reed Township	Bridge in Reed Township	1860	June 22, 1988	Inglenook; 40°24′35″N 76°59′6″W	Dauphin	Multi-span stone arch
Bridge in Rockdale Township		1887	June 22, 1988	Millers Station; 41°48′37″N 79°59′3″W	Crawford	Pratt truss
Bridge in Shaler Township		1915	June 22, 1988	Shaler Township; 40°32′42.03″N 79°57′45.49″W	Allegheny	Single-span stone arch
Bridge in Snake Spring Township	Bridge in Snake Spring Township	1934, 1935	June 22, 1988	Bedford; 40°0′49″N 78°28′18″W	Bedford	Skewed open-spandrel arch
Carversville Stone Bridge		1854	June 22, 1988	Carversville; 40°23′9″N 75°3′50″W	Bucks	Multi-span stone arch
Bridge in South Beaver Township		1878	June 22, 1988	Cannelton; 40°47′29″N 80°29′31″W	Beaver	Pin-connected Pratt truss
Bridge in Tinicum Township		1877	June 22, 1988	Point Pleasant; 40°25′24″N 75°3′55″W	Bucks	Pratt pony truss
Bridge in Upper Frederick Township		1888	June 22, 1988	Fagleysville; 40°16′28″N 75°29′7″W	Montgomery	Pratt through truss
Bridge in Upper Fredrick Township		1854	June 22, 1988	Zieglersville; 40°17′10″N 75°32′39″W	Montgomery	Multi-span stone arch
Bridge in Upper Merion Township		1789	June 22, 1988	Gulph Mills; 40°4′8″N 75°20′28″W	Montgomery	Small-span stone arch
Bridge in Washington Township		1884	June 22, 1988	Kralltown; 40°0′31″N 76°58′29″W	York	Pratt truss
Bridge in West Earl Township	Bridge in West Earl Township	1917	June 22, 1988	Brownstown; 40°7′42″N 76°12′1″W	Lancaster	Cantilevered concrete girder
Bridge in West Fallowfield Township		1885	June 22, 1988	Steelville; 39°52′58″N 75°59′31″W	Chester	Pratt pony truss
Bridge in West Mead Township		1888	June 22, 1988	Center Road Corners; 41°35′21″N 80°9′2″W	Crawford	Pratt through truss
Bridge in West Wheatfield Township	Bridge in West Wheatfield Township	1911	June 22, 1988	Robinson; 40°24′11″N 79°7′45″W	Indiana	Single-span camelback arch
Bridge in Westover Borough	Bridge in Westover Borough	1917	June 22, 1988	Westover; 40°45′9″N 78°40′3″W	Clearfield	Open-spandrel arch
Bridge in Williams Township	Bridge in Williams Township	1857	June 22, 1988	Stouts; 40°36′39″N 75°13′54″W	Northampton	Multi-span camelback arch
Bridge in Yardley Borough	Bridge in Yardley Township	1889	June 22, 1988	Scammells Corner; 40°14′3″N 74°50′2″W	Bucks	Single-span stone arch
Bridge Valley Bridge	Bridge Valley Bridge	1804	May 10, 1984	Hartsville; 40°16′34″N 75°5′1″W	Bucks	Neo-classical arch
Brower's Bridge		1904	June 22, 1988	Warwick; 40°8′51″N 75°46′10″W	Chester	Stone arch
Brownsville Bridge	Brownsville Bridge	1913	June 22, 1988	Brownsville, West Brownsville; 40°1′20″N 79°53′26″W	Fayette, Washington	Pennsylvania petit truss
Bryn Athyn-Lower Moreland Bridge		1828	June 22, 1988	Lower Moreland; 40°9′31″N 75°4′30″W	Montgomery	Multi-span stone arch
Cambridge Springs Bridge		1896	June 22, 1988	Cambridge Springs; 41°48′23″N 80°3′41″W	Crawford	Baltimore truss
Campbell's Bridge	Campbell's Bridge	1906	June 22, 1988	Milford Square; 40°25′42″N 75°23′54″W	Bucks	Camelback open-spandrel arch
Centennial Bridge	Centennial Bridge	1876	June 22, 1988	Center Valley; 40°31′43″N 75°23′31″W	Lehigh	Multi-span stone arch
Chain Bridge		1856, 1857	February 12, 1974	Easton; 40°39′14″N 75°14′56″W	Northampton	
Chandler Mill Bridge		1910	January 11, 2010	Kennett; 39°48′41″N 75°42′48″W	Chester	
Charleroi-Monessen Bridge		1906	June 22, 1988	Charleroi, Monessen; 40°9′6″N 79°54′15″W	Washington	Multi-span Pennsylvania truss
City Line Avenue Bridge		1913	June 22, 1988	Philadelphia; 39°59′7″N 75°15′33″W	Philadelphia	Single-span solid barrel arch
Claysville S Bridge		1818	April 4, 1975	Washington; 40°8′22″N 80°21′0″W	Washington	
Cold Spring Bridge		1930	June 22, 1988	North Hampton; 40°42′3″N 75°31′1″W	Lehigh	Open-spandrel arch
Colwell Cut Viaduct	Colwell Cut Viaduct	1922	June 22, 1988	Seminole; 40°56′13″N 79°21′47″W	Armstrong	Open-spandrel arch
Cope's Bridge		1807	March 7, 1985	Marshallton	Chester	
Coraopolis Bridge		1892, 1927	January 7, 1986	Coraopolis; 40°30′58″N 80°9′7″W	Allegheny	Bowstring truss
Corbin Bridge	Corbin Bridge	1937	March 20, 1990	Huntingdon; 40°27′16″N 77°59′0″W	Huntingdon	Suspension
County Bridge No. 101	County Bridge No. 101	1918	June 22, 1988	Rock Run; 39°59′29″N 75°49′52″W	Chester	Stilted arch
County Bridge No. 124	County Bridge No. 124	1916	June 22, 1988	Downingtown; 40°0′38″N 75°44′39″W	Chester	Three-span Arch
County Bridge No. 148		1911	June 22, 1988	Westtown; 39°55′54″N 75°33′6″W	Chester	
County Bridge No. 171	County Bridge No. 171	1907	June 22, 1988	Malvern; 40°3′12″N 75°30′3″W	Chester	Stone arch
County Bridge No. 36	County Bridge No. 36	1907	June 22, 1988	Portland; 40°55′7″N 75°5′37″W	Northampton	Reinforced concrete arch
County Bridge No. 54	County Bridge No. 54	1841, 1916	June 22, 1988	Prospectville; 40°8′22″N 75°13′1″W	Montgomery	Multi-span stone arch
Dauberville Bridge	Dauberville Bridge	1908	June 22, 1988	Dauberville; 40°27′25″N 75°58′37″W	Berks	Humpback multiple span arch
Dauphin County Bridge No. 27		1896	August 2, 1993	Pillow; 40°38′5″N 76°51′23″W	Dauphin, Northumberland	Metal truss
Deer Creek Bridge, Stewartstown Railroad		ca. 1895	May 4, 1995	Shrewsbury; 39°45′30″N 76°38′55″W	York	Girder
Delta Trestle Bridge, Maryland and Pennsylvania Railroad		ca. 1875	May 4, 1995	Delta; 39°43′44″N 76°19′49″W	York	Trestle
Dunlap's Creek Bridge	Dunlap's Creek Bridge	1836, 1839	July 31, 1978	Brownsville; 40°1′17″N 79°53′19″W	Fayette	Cast iron arch
English Center Suspension Bridge		1891	December 14, 1978	English Center; 41°26′5″N 77°17′21″W	Lycoming	Suspension
Etters Bridge		1889	February 27, 1986	Lower Allen Township, Fairview Township; 40°13′26″N 76°53′51″W	Cumberland, York	Pratt truss
Fortieth Street Bridge		1924	June 22, 1988	Millvale, Pittsburgh; 40°28′25″N 79°58′12″W	Allegheny	Long-span deck arch
Frankford Avenue Bridge (over Pennypack Creek)		1697	June 22, 1988	Philadelphia; Frankford Avenue over Pennypack Creek40°2′37″N 75°1′15″W	Philadelphia	Three-span stone arch, filled barrel arch
Frankford Avenue Bridge over Poquessing Creek		1904	June 22, 1988	Philadelphia; Frankford Avenue/Bristol Pike (US Route 13) over Poquessing Creek40°3′53″N 74°58′53″W	Philadelphia and Bucks	Single-span concrete arch
Frantz's Bridge		1887	June 22, 1988	Weidasville; 40°39′3″N 75°39′2″W	Lehigh	Multi-span stone arch replaced in 2011
Frehn Bridge		ca. 1890	March 20, 1990	Springfield; 40°8′0″N 77°59′29″W	Huntingdon	Pratt through truss
Gilbert Bridge		1899	May 5, 1989	Grantham, Siddonsburg; 40°9′13″N 76°58′57″W	Cumberland, York	Pratt through truss
Hammer Creek Bridge		1904	June 22, 1988	Brunnerville; 40°11′48″N 76°16′45″W	Lancaster	
Hare's Hill Road Bridge		1867	March 28, 1978	Phoenixville; 40°8′28.22″N 75°34′04.24″W	Chester	Wrought iron Bow string truss
Harrison Avenue Bridge	Harrison Avenue Bridge	1922	June 22, 1988	Scranton; 41°24′0″N 75°39′6″W	Lackawanna	Open-spandrel
Hays Bridge Historic District		ca. 1820, 1883	July 31, 1978	Mercersburg	Franklin	Burr truss
High Bridge		1904	March 26, 1976	Coatesville; 39°59′2″N 75°49′39″W	Chester	
Hogback Bridge	Hogback Bridge	1893	June 22, 1988	Curwensville; 40°58′25″N 78°29′26″W	Clearfield	Pennsylvania petit truss
Holme Avenue Bridge	Holme Avenue Bridge	1921	June 22, 1988	Philadelphia; 40°3′23″N 75°1′24″W	Philadelphia	Single-span concrete arch
Homestead High-Level Bridge		1934, 1937	January 7, 1986	Pittsburgh; 40°24′40″N 79°55′9″W	Allegheny	Wichert continuous truss
Horse Valley Bridge			June 22, 1988	Upper Strasburg; 40°3′57″N 77°45′34″W	Franklin	Multi-span stone arch
Horsham-Montgomery Bridge		1839	June 22, 1988	Fort Washington; 40°14′15″N 75°11′31″W	Montgomery	Multi-span stone arch
Howard Tunnel, Northern Central Railway	Howard Tunnel	1840, 1868	May 19, 1995	New Salem; 39°53′28″N 76°45′2″W	York	
Ironstone Bridge		1907	June 22, 1988	Morysville; 40°19′12″N 75°39′8″W	Berks	Single-span arch
Jerome Street Bridge		1935, 1937	June 22, 1988	McKeesport; 40°21′1.8″N 79°52′11.84″W	Allegheny	Two-hinged through arch
John's Burnt Mill Bridge		1800, 1823	December 16, 1974	New Oxford; 39°49′56″N 77°4′47″W	Adams	Camelback
Kise Mill Bridge	Kise Mill Bridge	1915	June 22, 1988	Woodside; 40°6′56″N 76°48′38″W	York	Camelback single span arch
Layton Bridge		1899	June 22, 1988	Layton; 40°5′21″N 79°43′49″W	Fayette	Pratt truss
Lenape Bridge		1911, 1912	June 22, 1988	Lenape; 39°54′54″N 75°37′47″W	Chester	Multi-span stone arch
Liberty Bridge		1928	June 22, 1988	Pittsburgh; 40°25′58″N 79°59′50″W	Allegheny	Multi-span Pratt truss
Lilly Bridge	Lilly Bridge	1832	June 22, 1988	Lilly; 40°25′25″N 78°37′3″W	Cambria	Single-span stone arch
Lindbergh Viaduct		1927	June 22, 1988	Reading; 40°19′52″N 75°54′0″W	Berks	Open-spandrel arch
Marion Bridge	Marion Bridge	1930	June 22, 1988	Point Marion; 39°44′22″N 79°54′19″W	Fayette, Greene	Warren through truss
Market Street Bridge	Market Street Bridge	1926, 1929	June 22, 1988	Kingston, Wilkes-Barre; 41°14′55″N 75°53′7″W	Luzerne	
Market Street Bridge		1928	June 22, 1988	Harrisburg; 40°15′0″N 76°53′27″W	Cumberland, Dauphin	Long-span monumental urban
Marshall's Bridge		1903	June 22, 1988	Little Washington; 40°3′23″N 75°45′31″W	Chester	
McClay's Twin Bridge (East)	McClay's Twin Bridge (East)	1827	June 22, 1988	Middle Spring; 40°5′54″N 77°34′15″W	Franklin	Multi-span camelback arch
McClay's Twin Bridge (West)	McClay's Twin Bridge (West)	1827	June 22, 1988	Middle Spring; 40°5′53″N 77°34′12″W	Franklin	Multi-span camelback arch
McKees Rocks Bridge		1931	November 14, 1988	McKees Rocks; 40°28′37.34″N 80°2′56.04″W	Allegheny	Metal through arch
Albertus L. Meyers Bridge		1913	June 22, 1988	Allentown; 40°35′45″N 75°28′16″W	Lehigh	Open-spandrel arch
Milanville-Skinners Falls Bridge	Milanville-Skinners Falls Bridge	1904	November 14, 1988	Milanville; 41°40′10″N 75°3′31″W	Wayne	Baltimore truss
Muddy Creek Bridge, Maryland and Pennsylvania Railroad		ca. 1909	May 4, 1995	Sunnyburn; 39°45′37″N 76°21′5″W	York	Pratt truss
Newtown Creek Bridge		1796, 1875	June 22, 1988	Newtown; 40°13′40″N 74°56′20″W	Bucks	Two-span stone arch
Ninth Street Bridge		1925, 1926	January 7, 1986	Pittsburgh; 40°26′48″N 80°0′1″W	Allegheny	Eyebar suspension
Old Columbia-Wrightsville Bridge		1929, 1930	June 22, 1988	Columbia, Wrightsville; 40°1′50″N 76°30′41″W	Lancaster, York	Open-spandrel arch
Pennsylvania Railroad Bridge		1901, 1904	August 13, 1979	Pittsburgh; 40°26′58″N 79°59′50″W	Allegheny	Double-decked through truss
Pennsylvania Railroad Bridge	Pennsylvania Railroad Bridge	1903	June 6, 1979	Morrisville; 40°12′31″N 74°45′58″W	Bucks	Stone arch
Pennsylvania Railroad Bridge over Shavers Creek		1889	March 20, 1990	Petersburg; 40°34′1″N 78°2′54″W	Huntingdon	Stone arch
Pennsylvania Railroad Old Bridge over Standing Stone Creek	Pennsylvania Railroad Old Bridge over Standing Stone Creek	1848, 1849	March 20, 1990	Huntingdon; 40°28′51″N 78°0′17″W	Huntingdon	Stone arch
Perkiomen Bridge	Perkiomen Bridge	1799	June 22, 1988	Collegeville; 40°11′3″N 75°26′54″W	Montgomery	Multi-span stone arch
Pithole Stone Arch	Pithole Stone Arch	1897	June 22, 1988	Cornplanter / President Townships; 41°29′13″N 79°35′43″W	Venango	Single-span stone arch
Pond Eddy Bridge		1904	November 14, 1988	Pond Eddy; 41°26′21″N 74°49′13″W	Pike	Pennsylvania truss
Pond Mill Bridge	Pond Mill Bridge		June 22, 1988	Bermudian; 39°59′45″N 77°3′31″W	Adams	Three-span camelback arch
Quaker Bridge		1898	June 22, 1988	Greenville; 41°25′33″N 80°22′22″W	Mercer	Pratt through truss
Reading-Halls Station Bridge	Reading-Halls Station Bridge	ca. 1850	January 17, 1980	Muncy; 41°14′9″N 76°49′58″W	Lycoming	Pony Howe truss
Ridge Avenue Bridge in Philadelphia		1888	June 22, 1988	Philadelphia; 40°0′53″N 75°12′26″W	Philadelphia	Multi-span stone arch
Ridge Road Bridge, Stewartstown Railroad		ca. 1895	May 4, 1995	Stewartstown; 39°45′35″N 76°37′33″W	York	Girder
Rockville Bridge	Rockville Bridge	1900, 1902	August 15, 1975	Marysville, Rockville; 40°19′59″N 76°54′42″W	Dauphin, Perry	Stone masonry arch
Runk Bridge	Runk Bridge	1889	March 20, 1990	Shirleysburg; 40°16′40″N 77°53′14″W	Huntingdon	Pratt truss
S Bridge		1919	June 22, 1988	Sheridan; 40°22′25″N 76°13′7″W	Berks	Multi-span stone arch likely replaced
Scott Creek Bridge-North, Maryland and Pennsylvania Railroad		ca. 1909	May 4, 1995	Bryansville; 39°44′46″N 76°20′29″W	York	Girder
Second Street Bridge		1919	June 22, 1988	Chester; 39°50′41″N 75°21′39″W	Delaware	tied-arch, destroyed
Seventh Street Bridge		1925, 1926	January 7, 1986	Pittsburgh; 40°26′52″N 80°0′12″W	Allegheny	Eyebar suspension
Sixteenth Street Bridge		1923	August 13, 1979	Pittsburgh; 40°27′4″N 79°59′26″W	Allegheny	Tied arch
Sixth Street Bridge		1927, 1928	January 7, 1986	Pittsburgh; 40°26′43″N 80°0′12″W	Allegheny	Eyebar suspension
Skippack Bridge	Skippack Bridge	1792	December 2, 1970	Evansburg; 40°10′49″N 75°25′20″W	Montgomery	Eight-arch masonry
Smithfield Street Bridge		1883, 1889	March 21, 1974	Pittsburgh; 40°26′5″N 80°0′8″W	Allegheny	Pauli truss
Soldiers and Sailors Memorial Bridge		1930	June 22, 1988	Harrisburg; 40°16′2″N 76°52′43″W	Dauphin	Long-span monumental urban
South Road Bridge, Northern Central Railway		ca. 1871	May 4, 1995	Larue; 39°49′14″N 76°45′39″W	York	Masonry arch
South Tenth Street Bridge		1932	January 7, 1986	Pittsburgh; 40°25′57″N 79°59′23″W	Allegheny	Wire-cable suspension
Staple Bend Tunnel		1833, 1853	April 19, 1994	Conemaugh Township; 40°21′33″N 78°51′19″W	Cambria	Tunnel
Starrucca Viaduct		1848	October 29, 1975	Lanesboro; 41°57′51″N 75°35′2″W	Susquehanna	
Stone Arch Road Bridge, Stewartstown Railroad		ca. 1895	May 4, 1995	Railroad; 39°45′1″N 76°41′14″W	York	Girder
Sutch Road Bridge in Marlborough Township	Sutch Road Bridge	1910	June 22, 1988	Milford; 40°22′4″N 75°25′24″W	Montgomery	Multi-span stone arch
Swamp Creek Road Bridge		1892	June 22, 1988	Sumneytown; 40°20′3″N 75°26′59″W	Montgomery	Multi-span stone arch
Thirty-third Street Bridge in Philadelphia		1901	June 22, 1988	Philadelphia; 39°58′43″N 75°11′24″W	Philadelphia	Single-span stone skew arch
Trenton City/Calhoun Street Bridge	Calhoun Street Bridge	1885	November 20, 1975	Morrisville; 40°13′11″N 74°46′42″W	Bucks	Phoenix column
Tunkhannock Viaduct		1912, 1915	April 11, 1977	Nicholson; 41°37′19.94″N 75°46′38.41″W	Wyoming	Open-spandrel concrete deck arch bridge
Union Canal Tunnel		1826, 1827, 1857	October 1, 1974	Lebanon; 40°20′58″N 76°27′42″W	Lebanon	
University Avenue Bridge		1925, 1930	May 26, 1994	Philadelphia; 39°56′35″N 75°11′49″W	Philadelphia	
Valley Road Bridge, Stewartstown Railroad	Valley Road Bridge	1885, 1920	May 4, 1995	Stewartstown; 39°45′19″N 76°36′35″W	York	Pratt truss
Walnut Lane Bridge	Walnut Lane Bridge	1908	May 10, 1988	Philadelphia	Philadelphia	
Walnut Street Bridge		1889, 1900	June 5, 1972	Harrisburg; 40°15′18″N 76°53′19″W	Dauphin	Multi-span Phoenix
Waterville Bridge		1890	November 14, 1988	Swatara Gap; 40°28′49″N 76°31′55″W	Lebanon	Lenticular truss
Watsontown River Bridge	Watsontown River Bridge	1927	June 22, 1988	Watsontown, White Deer; 41°4′51″N 76°51′55″W	Northumberland, Union	Open-spandrel arch
Webster Donora Bridge		1906, 1908	June 22, 1988	Donora, Webster; 40°11′3″N 79°51′8″W	Washington, Westmoreland	Multi-span through truss
Welty's Mill Bridge	Welty's Mill Bridge	1856	January 6, 1983	Waynesboro; 39°44′16″N 77°34′20″W	Franklin	
West End-North Side Bridge		1930, 1932	August 24, 1979	Pittsburgh; 40°26′41″N 80°1′41″W	Allegheny	Tied arch
West Hickory Bridge	West Hickory Bridge	1896	June 22, 1988	West Hickory; 41°34′11″N 79°24′21″W	Forest	Pratt truss
George Westinghouse Memorial Bridge		1930, 1932	March 28, 1977	East Pittsburgh; 40°23′38″N 79°50′16″W	Allegheny	Parabolic arch
Wissahickon Memorial Bridge		1931	June 22, 1988	Philadelphia; 40°1′27″N 75°11′46″W	Philadelphia	Open-spandrel concrete arch
Witherup Bridge		1906	June 22, 1988	Kennerdell; 41°15′18″N 79°50′27″W	Venango	Pratt pony truss
Yeakle's Mill Bridge	Yeakle Mill Bridge	1888	November 14, 1988	Yeakle Mill; 39°44′6″N 78°2′15″W	Franklin	Pratt pony truss

== Former listings ==
Name	Image	Built	Listed	Location	County	Type
Bridge in Athens Township	Bridge in Athens Township	1913	June 22, 1988 removed August 22, 2012	Athens; 41°57′29″N 76°30′52″W	Bradford	Pennsylvania (petit) truss Highway Bridges Owned by the Commonwealth of Pennsylvania, Department of Transportation TR
Bridge in Lynn Township	Bridge in Lynn Township	1880	Removed March 21, 2003	Steinsville	Lehigh	Bowstring arch
Bridge in New Garden Township		1871	June 22, 1988; Removed March 23, 2010	Landenberg; 39°46′39″N 75°46′19″W	Chester	Pratt pony truss
Bridge in Plunkett's Creek Township		1932	Removed July 22, 2002	Proctor	Lycoming	Single-span stone arch
Bridge in Ridley Park Borough			Removed March 1, 1993	Ridley Park	Delaware	Single-span stone arch
Bridge in Tredyffrin Township			June 22, 1988; Removed July 16, 2010	Port Kennedy; 40°5′31″N 75°25′20″W	Chester	Single-span arch
Kinzua Viaduct		1882, 1900	August 29, 1977; Removed July 21, 2004	Mount Jewett	McKean	Howe truss
Mortonville Bridge		1826	September 18, 1985; Removed July 16, 2010	Coatesville; 39°56′47″N 75°46′47″W	Chester	Stone arch
Stone Arch Bridge, Starrucca Creek		ca. 1844	Removed January 1, 1979	Starrucca	Wayne	Elliptical stone arch
