= Quaker Bridge (disambiguation) =

Quaker Bridge may refer to:

- Quaker Bridge, a bridge in Hempfield Township, Mercer County, Pennsylvania
- Quaker Bridge, Mercer County, New Jersey, an unincorporated community
- Quaker Bridge, New York, a ghost town
