= Landenberger =

Landenberger may refer to:

- Christian Landenberger, (1862-1927), German painter
- George Landenberger, United States Navy Captain and the 23rd Governor of American Samoa
- Paul Landenberger, German watchmaker

== See also ==
- Landenberg
- Landenberg Bridge
- Landenberg, Pennsylvania
