= Hempfield Township, Pennsylvania =

Hempfield Township is the name of some places in the U.S. state of Pennsylvania:

- Hempfield Township, Mercer County, Pennsylvania
- Hempfield Township, Westmoreland County, Pennsylvania

== See also ==
- East Hempfield Township, Lancaster County, Pennsylvania
- West Hempfield Township, Pennsylvania
