= Marshall's Bridge =

- U.S. National Register of Historic Places
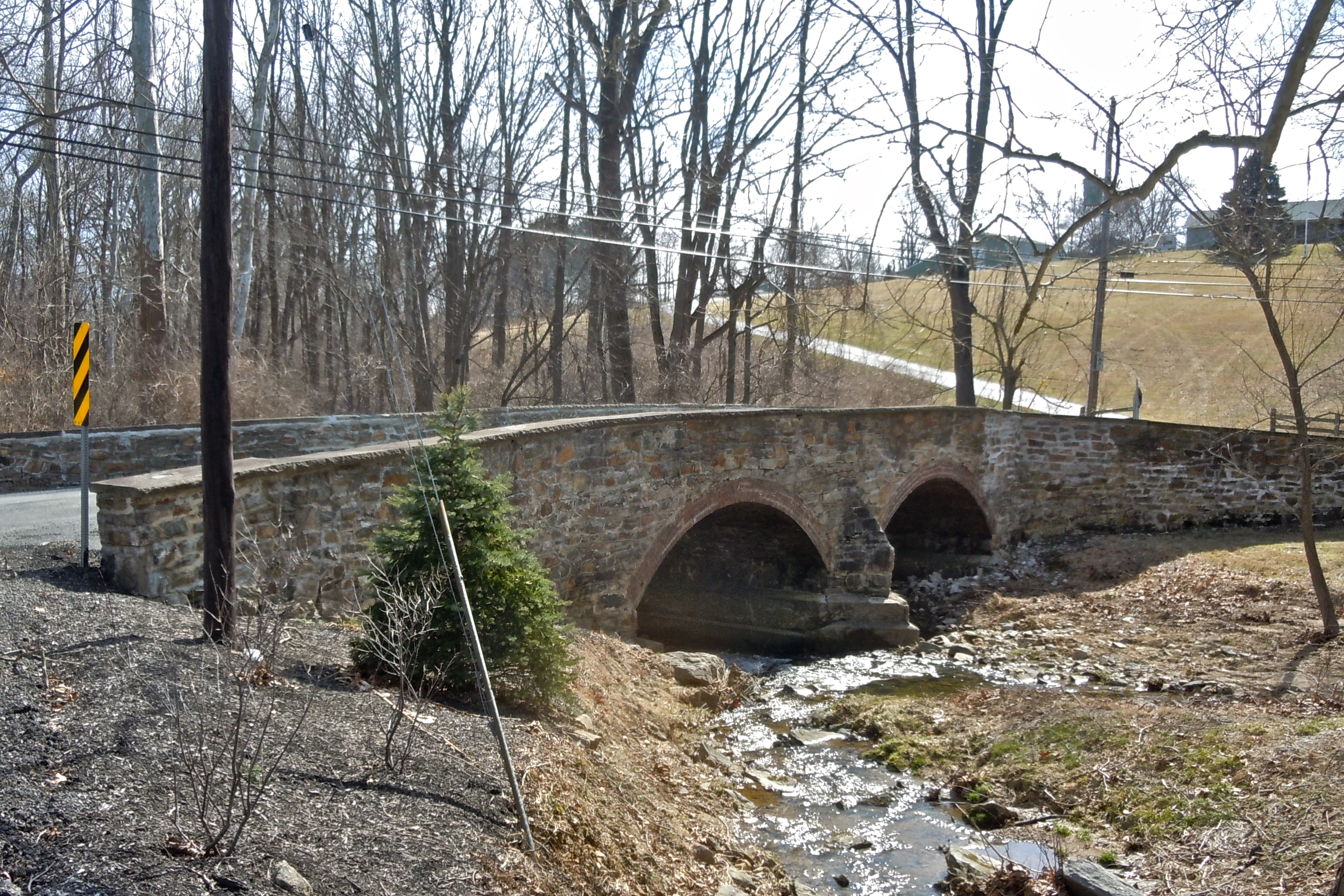
- Marshall's Bridge, March 2011

- Location within Pennsylvania Location within the United States
- Location: Marshall Road over Culbertson Run, East Brandywine Township, Pennsylvania
- Coordinates: 40°3′23″N 75°45′31″W
- Area: less than one acre
- Built: 1903
- Built by: McCormick, P.J., & Sons
- MPS: Highway Bridges Owned by the Commonwealth of Pennsylvania, Department of Transportation TR
- NRHP reference No.: 88000880
- Added to NRHP: June 22, 1988

Marshall's Bridge is a historic stone arch bridge located in East Brandywine Township, Chester County, Pennsylvania. It spans Culbertson Run and is right next to Bridge Mill Farm. It has two arch spans, one is 20-foot-long (6.1 m) and the second is 19-foot-long (5.8 m). The bridge was constructed in 1903 of stone with brick arch rings.

It was listed on the National Register of Historic Places in 1988.
