= Clinton Township, Venango County, Pennsylvania =

Township in Pennsylvania, US

Coordinates: 41°16′00″N 79°51′59″W

- Township
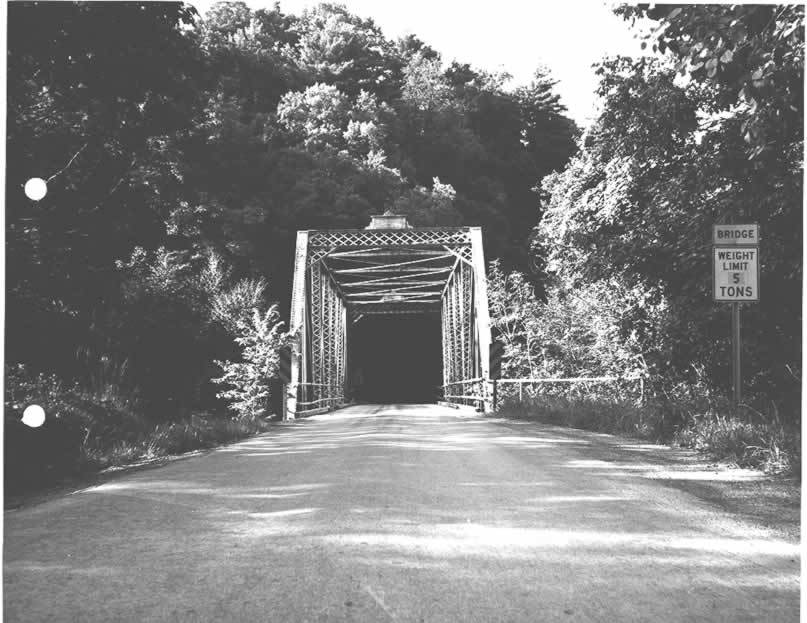
- This 1882 bridge over Scrubgrass Creek is on the National Register of Historic Places

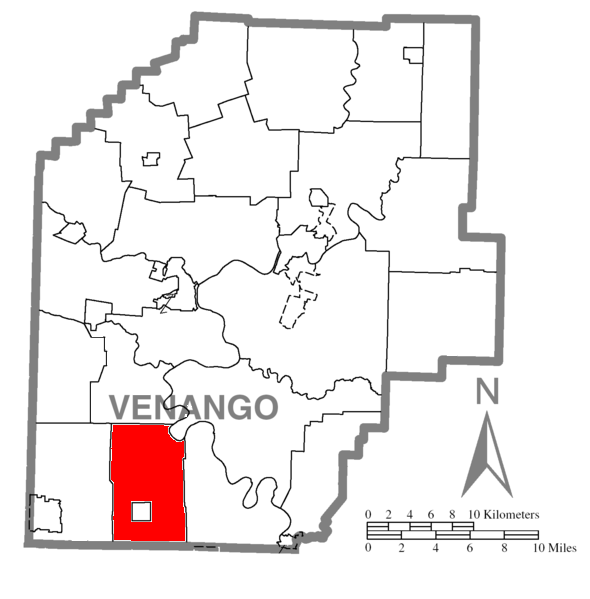
- Map of Venango County, Pennsylvania highlighting Clinton Township

- Map of Venango County, Pennsylvania
- Country: United States
- State: Pennsylvania
- County: Venango
- Settled: 1798
- Incorporated: 1855

Government
  - Type: Board of Supervisors

Area
  - Total: 28.72 sq mi (74.38 km^{2})
  - Land: 28.44 sq mi (73.67 km^{2})
  - Water: 0.27 sq mi (0.71 km^{2})

Population (2020)
  - Total: 951 ▲
  - Estimate (2024): 938
  - Density: 28.6/sq mi (11.04/km^{2})
- Time zone: UTC-5 (Eastern (EST))
  - Summer (DST): UTC-4 (EDT)
- Area code: 814
- FIPS code: 42-121-14344

Clinton Township is a township in Venango County, Pennsylvania, United States. The population was 951 at the 2020 census, an increase from 854 in 2010 and 758 at the 2000 census.

== History ==
The Bridge in Clinton Township and Witherup Bridge are listed on the National Register of Historic Places.

== Geography ==
According to the U.S. Census Bureau, the township has a total area of 28.7 square miles (74 km^{2}), of which 28.5 square miles (74 km^{2}) is land and 0.3 square miles (0.78 km^{2}) (0.90%) is water.

== Demographics ==
Historical population
Census	Pop.	Note	%±
2000	758		—
2010	854		12.7%
2020	951		11.4%
2024 (est.)	938		−1.4%
U.S. Decennial Census

As of the census of 2000, there were 758 people, 278 households, and 219 families residing in the township. The population density was 26.6 inhabitants per square mile (10.3/km^{2}). There were 414 housing units at an average density of 14.5/sq mi (5.6/km^{2}). The racial makeup of the township was 97.63% White, 1.32% African American, 0.26% Asian, 0.13% from other races, and 0.66% from two or more races. Hispanic or Latino of any race were 0.13% of the population.

There were 278 households, out of which 30.9% had children under the age of 18 living with them, 66.9% were married couples living together, 5.4% had a female householder with no husband present, and 21.2% were non-families. 18.0% of all households were made up of individuals, and 8.3% had someone living alone who was 65 years of age or older. The average household size was 2.73 and the average family size was 3.07.

In the township the population was spread out, with 25.9% under the age of 18, 7.8% from 18 to 24, 27.3% from 25 to 44, 25.7% from 45 to 64, and 13.3% who were 65 years of age or older. The median age was 37 years. For every 100 females, there were 107.7 males. For every 100 females age 18 and over, there were 108.1 males.

The median income for a household in the township was $37,361, and the median income for a family was $40,563. Males had a median income of $32,375 versus $17,656 for females. The per capita income for the township was $16,370. About 8.1% of families and 11.2% of the population were below the poverty line, including 14.7% of those under age 18 and 3.2% of those age 65 or over.
