= Achey's Mill =

Achey's Mill is a former grist mill located in Milford Square, Pennsylvania fed by the Unami Creek. It was in operation until sometime between 1926 and 1936. The mill was converted into a private residence in the late 1960s. The miller's residence was located on the same property parcel until 1962, when it was sub-divided. Outbuildings on both properties were used to assist the mill and its race. Today, both mill properties are owned privately as private residences.

== History ==
It is unknown when the mill was constructed, but based on local records and documents, it has been standing since at least 1750. The miller's home was constructed in 1740, and was renovated into the manor house of Heistville (today Milford Square) in 1818 by the Heist family. The house was also featured in the November 1, 1786, edition of Ben Franklin's Pennsylvania Gazette, where it was advertised for sale. Both properties tie their roots originally to Joseph Growden, former speaker of the Pennsylvania House of Representatives who inherited 1490 acres from William Penn in 1715. The two properties today have together shrunk to just above 110 acres with the inclusion of a large forest.
