= East Brandywine Township, Pennsylvania =

Township in Pennsylvania, US

East Brandywine Township
- Township
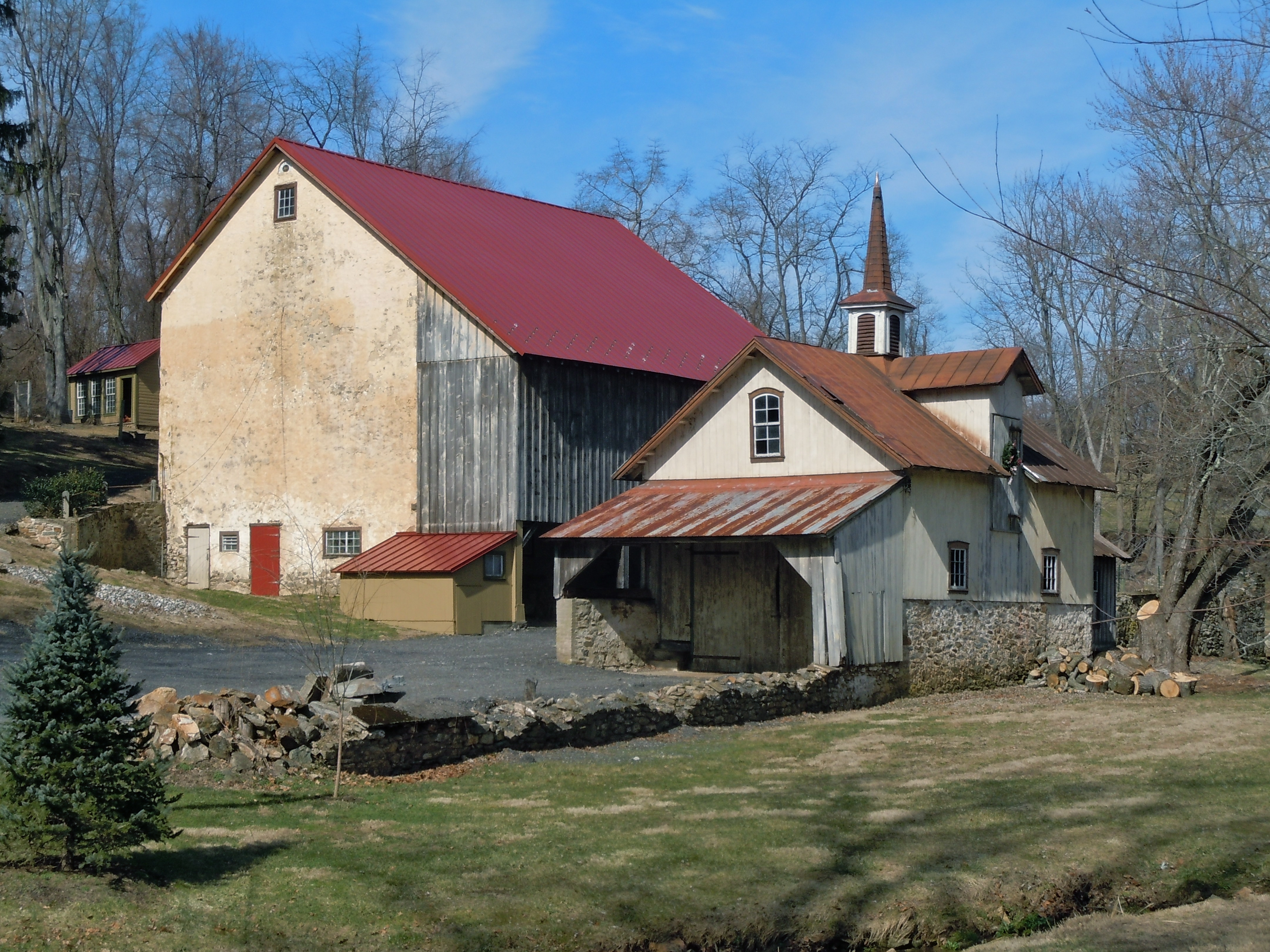
- Bridge Mill Farm in East Brandywine Township

- Logo

- Location in Chester County and of Chester County in Pennsylvania

- Location of Pennsylvania in the United States
- Coordinates: 40°01′55″N 75°44′53″W
- Country: United States
- State: Pennsylvania
- County: Chester

Area
  - Total: 11.25 sq mi (29.15 km^{2})
  - Land: 11.15 sq mi (28.89 km^{2})
  - Water: 0.10 sq mi (0.26 km^{2})
- Elevation: 577 ft (176 m)

Population (2020)
  - Total: 9,741 ▲
  - Estimate (2023): 10,246
  - Density: 754.0/sq mi (291.12/km^{2})
- Time zone: UTC-5 (EST)
  - Summer (DST): UTC-4 (EDT)
- Area code: 610
- FIPS code: 42-029-20864
- Website: www.ebrandywine.org

East Brandywine Township is a township in Chester County, Pennsylvania, United States. The population was 9,741 at the 2020 census.

== History ==
The Bridge Mill Farm and Marshall's Bridge are listed on the National Register of Historic Places.

== Demographics ==
Historical population
Census	Pop.	Note	%±
1930	774		—
1940	913		18.0%
1950	1,108		21.4%
1960	1,618		46.0%
1970	2,741		69.4%
1980	4,690		71.1%
1990	5,179		10.4%
2000	5,822		12.4%
2010	6,742		15.8%
2020	9,741		44.5%
2023 (est.)	10,246		5.2%

At the 2010 census, the township was 93.3% non-Hispanic White, 1.4% Black or African American, 0.1% Native American, 2.2% Asian, 0.1% Native Hawaiian or other Pacific Islander, and 1.2% were two or more races. 1.8% of the population were of Hispanic or Latino ancestry.

At the 2000 census, there were 5,822 people, 2,003 households, and 1,644 families living in the township. The population density was 511.3 inhabitants per square mile (197.4/km^{2}). There were 2,035 housing units at an average density of 178.7 per square mile (69.0/km^{2}). The racial makeup of the township was 96.62% White, 1.25% African American, 0.10% Native American, 1.15% Asian, 0.02% Pacific Islander, 0.07% from other races, and 0.79% from two or more races. Hispanic or Latino of any race were 0.52%.

There were 2,003 households, 41.1% had children under the age of 18 living with them, 71.5% were married couples living together, 7.8% had a female householder with no husband present, and 17.9% were non-families. 14.5% of households were made up of individuals, and 3.4% were one person aged 65 or older. The average household size was 2.90 and the average family size was 3.23.

The age distribution was 28.9% under the age of 18, 6.2% from 18 to 24, 28.3% from 25 to 44, 29.1% from 45 to 64, and 7.6% 65 or older. The median age was 39 years. For every 100 females, there were 98.3 males. For every 100 females age 18 and over, there were 94.1 males.

The median household income was $76,217 and the median family income was $81,886. Males had a median income of $54,327 versus $30,611 for females. The per capita income for the township was $32,178. About 1.0% of families and 1.9% of the population were below the poverty line, including 1.7% of those under age 18 and 6.0% of those age 65 or over.

== Geography ==
According to the United States Census Bureau, the township has a total area of 11.4 square miles (30 km^{2}), all land.

== Education ==
The township is situated within the Downingtown Area School District. Brandywine-Wallace Elementary School is in the township.

Most of the township is zoned to Brandywine-Wallace Elementary, while parts are zoned to Beaver Creek Elementary School and Springton Manor Elementary School. Residents are zoned to Downingtown Middle School and Downingtown West High School.

Delaware County Community College maintains its Downingtown Campus in the township, on the site of the former Downingtown Industrial and Agricultural School.

== Transportation ==
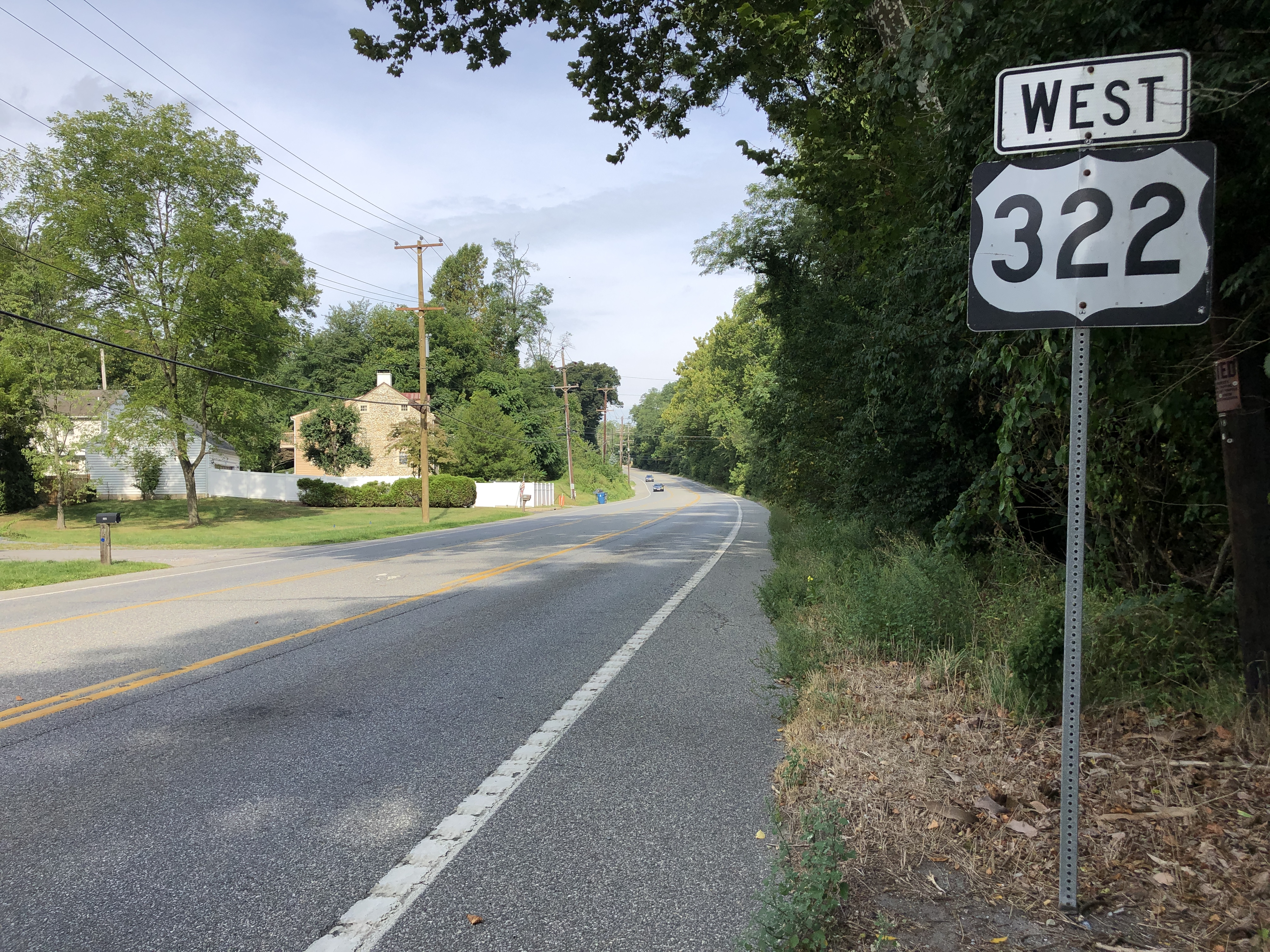
US 322 westbound in East Brandywine Township

As of 2020, there were 59.05 miles (95.03 km) of public roads in East Brandywine Township, of which 22.24 miles (35.79 km) were maintained by the Pennsylvania Department of Transportation (PennDOT) and 36.81 miles (59.24 km) were maintained by the township.

U.S. Route 322 and Pennsylvania Route 282 are the numbered highways serving East Brandywine Township. US 322 follows a northwest-southeast alignment along Horseshoe Pike through western and southern portions of the township, while PA 282 follows Creek Road along the banks of East Branch Brandywine Creek along the northern and eastern edges of the township.
