= Campbell's Bridge =

- U.S. National Register of Historic Places
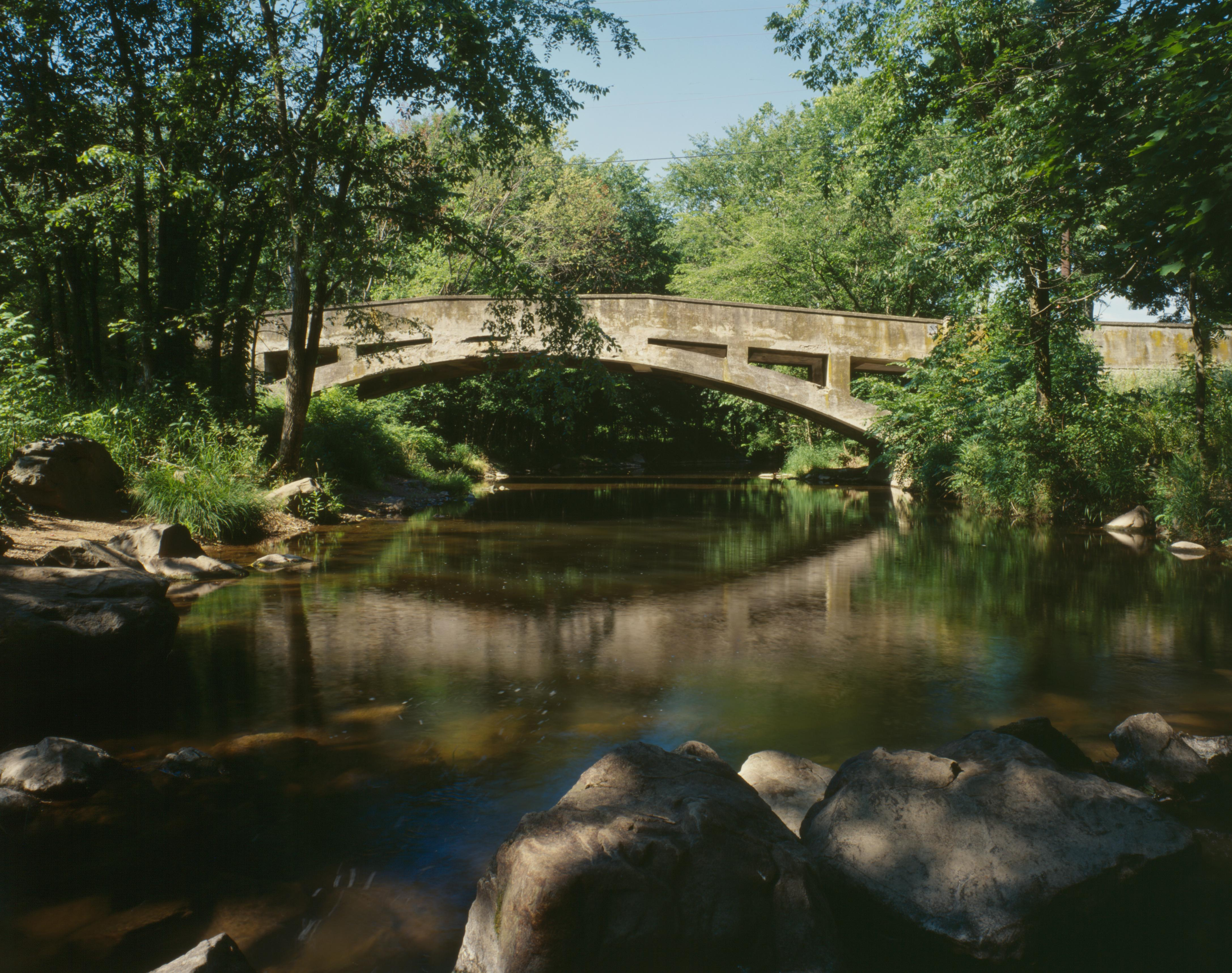

- Location within Pennsylvania Location within the United States
- Location: Allentown Road over Unami Creek, Milford Square, Pennsylvania
- Coordinates: 40°25′42″N 75°23′54″W
- Area: less than one acre
- Built: 1906
- Architectural style: Camelback open-spandrel arch
- MPS: Highway Bridges Owned by the Commonwealth of Pennsylvania, Department of Transportation TR
- NRHP reference No.: 88000733
- Added to NRHP: June 22, 1988

Campbell's Bridge formerly spanned Unami Creek on Allentown Road in Milford Square, Bucks County, Pennsylvania. The 72-foot-long (22 m), 20-foot-wide (6.1 m) bridge was built in 1906-1907. The bridge was designed by A. Oscar Martin and built by the Dailey Construction Company. It was one of the oldest examples of reinforced concrete arch bridges in the United States.

It was placed on the National Register of Historic Places on June 22, 1988.

In October 2005 the section of road containing the bridge was closed so that the single-span bridge could be replaced. The work was scheduled to be completed by December 2005. The new bridge is 120 feet (37 m) long and 32 feet (9.8 m) wide and is a concrete box-beam style.

== See also ==
- National Register of Historic Places listings in Bucks County, Pennsylvania
- List of bridges documented by the Historic American Engineering Record in Pennsylvania
- List of bridges on the National Register of Historic Places in Pennsylvania
