= Bridge in Clinton Township =

- U.S. National Register of Historic Places
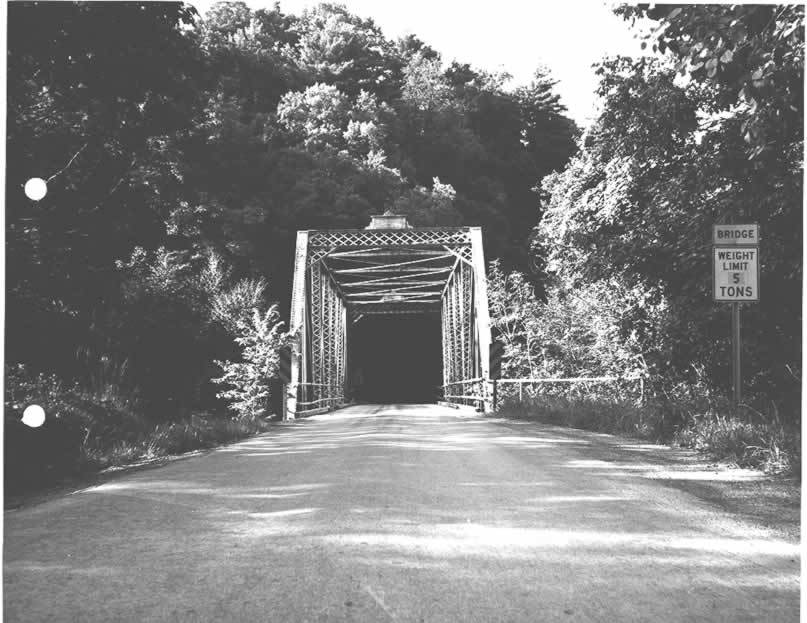
- Bridge in Clinton Township, 1982

- Location within Pennsylvania Location within the United States
- Location: State Route 3005 over Scrubgrass Creek, south of Kennerdell, Clinton Township, Pennsylvania
- Coordinates: 41°14′17″N 79°51′16″W
- Area: less than one acre
- Built: 1887
- Built by: Smith Bridge Company, Toledo, OH
- Architectural style: Pratt through truss bridge
- MPS: Highway Bridges Owned by the Commonwealth of Pennsylvania, Department of Transportation TR
- NRHP reference No.: 88000808
- Added to NRHP: June 22, 1988

Bridge in Clinton Township is a historic Pratt through truss bridge located in Clinton Township, Venango County, Pennsylvania. It was built by the Smith Bridge Company of Toledo, Ohio in 1887. It measures 106-foot-long (32 m) and crosses the Scrubgrass Creek.

It was listed on the National Register of Historic Places in 1988.
