= Kennerdell, Pennsylvania =

Unincorporated community in Pennsylvania, US

Coordinates: 41°16′14″N 79°50′09″W

- Census-designated place
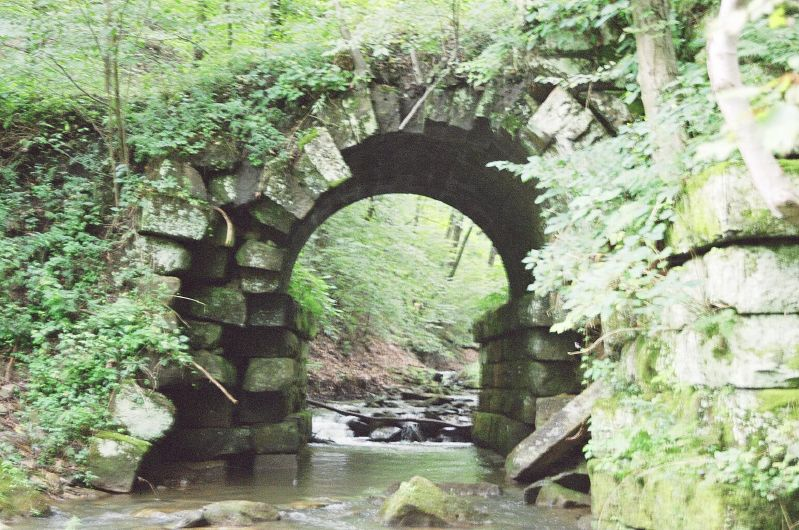
- Old bridge near Kennerdell
- Interactive map of Kennerdell, Pennsylvania
- Country: United States
- State: Pennsylvania
- County: Venango

Area
  - Total: 2.25 sq mi (5.82 km^{2})
  - Land: 2.25 sq mi (5.82 km^{2})
  - Water: 0 sq mi (0.00 km^{2})

Population (2020)
  - Total: 176
  - Density: 78.2/sq mi (30.21/km^{2})
- Time zone: UTC-5 (Eastern (EST))
  - Summer (DST): UTC-4 (EDT)
- FIPS code: 42-39336

Kennerdell is a census-designated place located in Rockland Township, Venango County in the state of Pennsylvania. The community is located in southern Venango County along the Allegheny River. As of the 2010 census the population was 247 residents.

Long before the arrival of the railroad, Kennerdell was a busy trade stop along the Allegheny River because of its location at the confluence of many tributaries. By the War of 1812, Kennerdell was shipping tons of material downriver. Wool, coal, timber from the great Allegheny forests north of Kennerdell, and produce from the area's farms were shipped on barges down the Allegheny to Fort Pitt and to market in Pittsburgh.

== Demographics ==
Historical population
Census	Pop.	Note	%±
2020	176		—
U.S. Decennial Census
