= Cold Spring Bridge =

- U.S. National Register of Historic Places
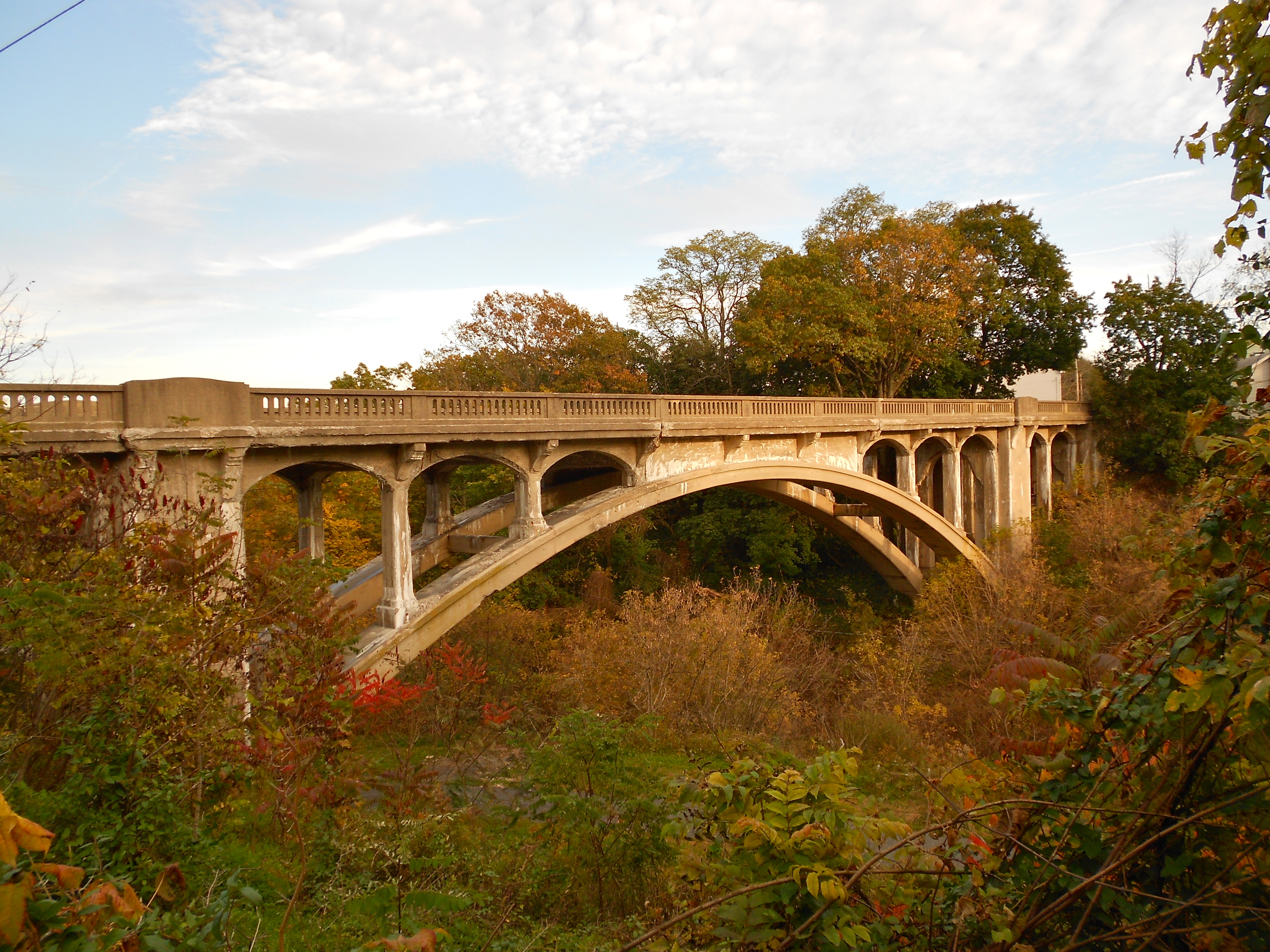
- Cold Spring Bridge in October 2012

- Location within Pennsylvania Location within the United States
- Location: 2nd Street over Spring Creek, Whitehall Township and North Whitehall Township, Pennsylvania
- Coordinates: 40°42′3″N 75°31′1″W
- Area: less than one acre
- Built: 1930
- Built by: Dawes & Norris
- Architectural style: Open-spandrel arch
- MPS: Highway Bridges Owned by the Commonwealth of Pennsylvania, Department of Transportation TR
- NRHP reference No.: 88000874
- Added to NRHP: June 22, 1988

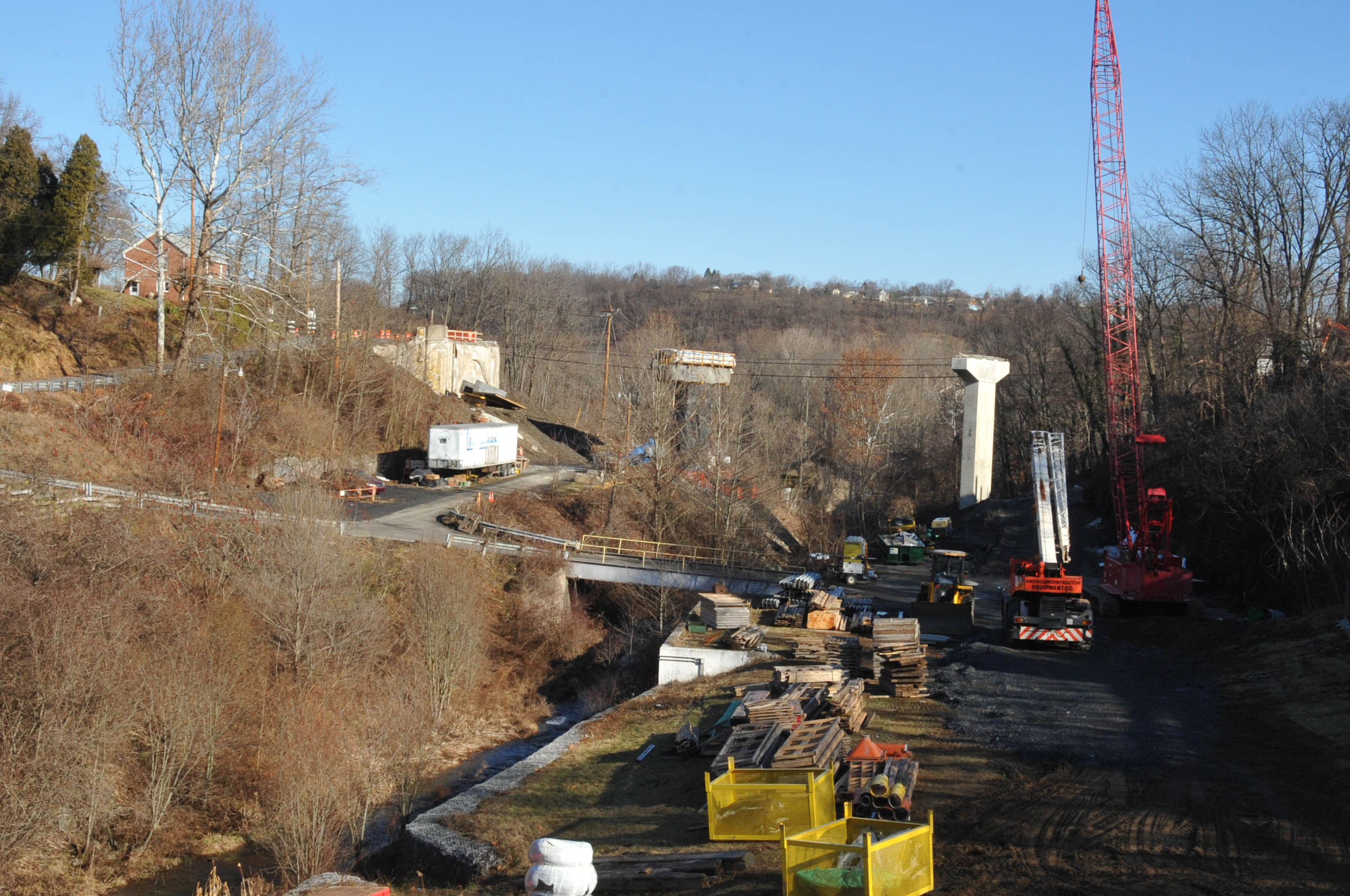
The demolition of the Cold Spring Bridge in 2014

Cold Spring Bridge is a historic concrete open-spandrel arch bridge located at Whitehall Township and North Whitehall Township in Lehigh County, Pennsylvania. The bridge was built in 1930, and is a 228-foot-long (69 m) bridge, with a single 160-foot-long (49 m) arch consisting of six symmetrically placed spandrel arches.

The bridge crosses Spring Creek.

It was listed on the National Register of Historic Places in 1988.

In 2014, the bridge was considered to be structurally deficient and scheduled to be replaced by a three span bulb T-beam bridge costing $3.8 million. It had an average daily traffic volume of 2,461 vehicles.
