= Belmont Avenue Bridge in Philadelphia =

- U.S. National Register of Historic Places
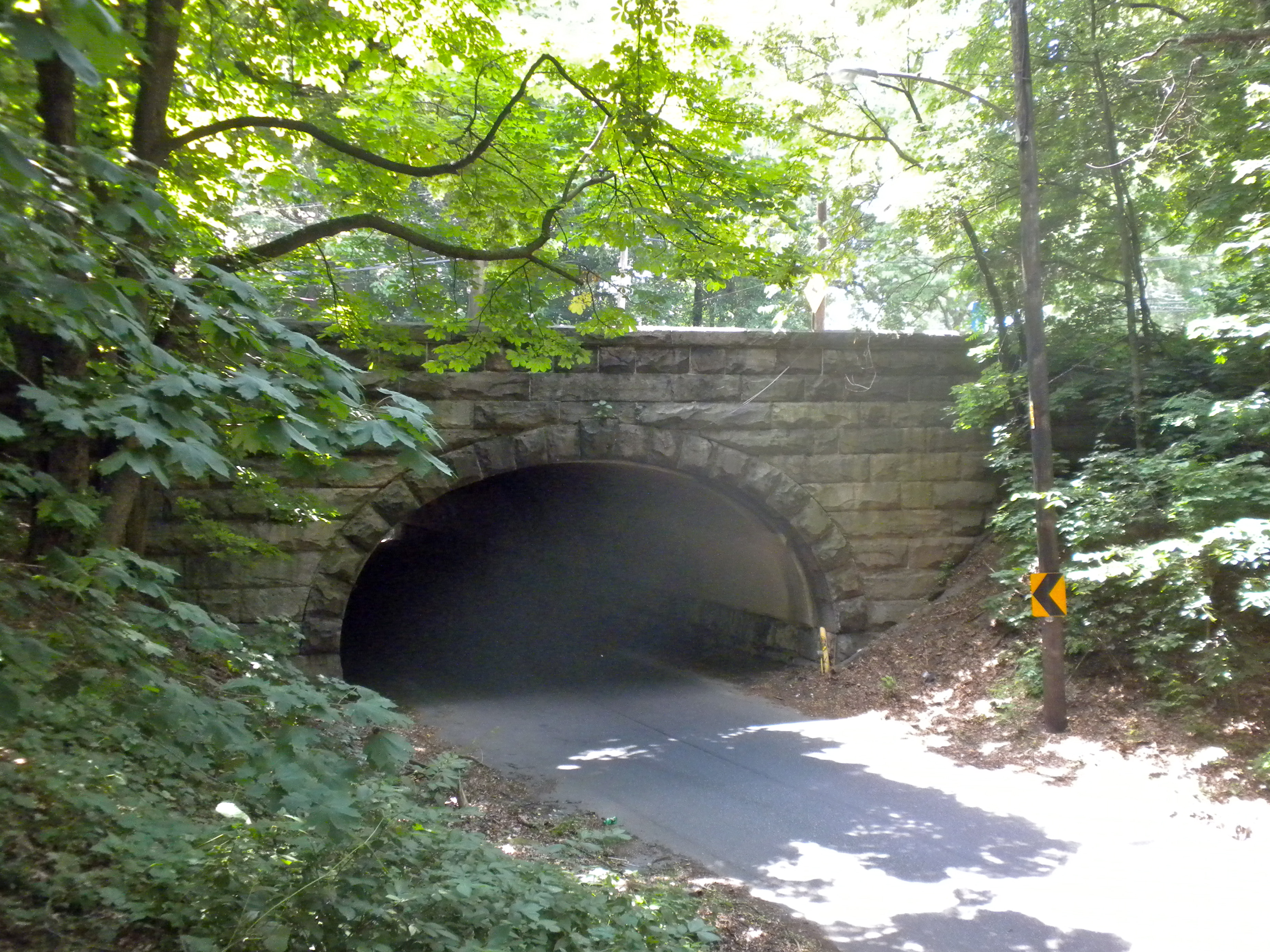
- Belmont Avenue Bridge in Philadelphia, June 2010

- Location within Philadelphia Location within Pennsylvania Location within the United States
- Location: Belmont Ave. over Ramp B, Philadelphia, Pennsylvania
- Coordinates: 39°59′36″N 75°13′6″W
- Area: less than one acre
- Built: 1896
- Architectural style: Single span stone arch
- MPS: Highway Bridges Owned by the Commonwealth of Pennsylvania, Department of Transportation TR
- NRHP reference No.: 88000843
- Added to NRHP: June 22, 1988

Belmont Avenue Bridge in Philadelphia is a historic stone arch bridge located in Fairmount Park, Philadelphia, Pennsylvania. It was built in 1896, and is a single-span bridge. The arch measures 29-foot-wide (8.8 m).

It was added to the National Register of Historic Places in 1988.
