= Milford Square, Pennsylvania =

Unincorporated community in Pennsylvania, US

- Census-designated place
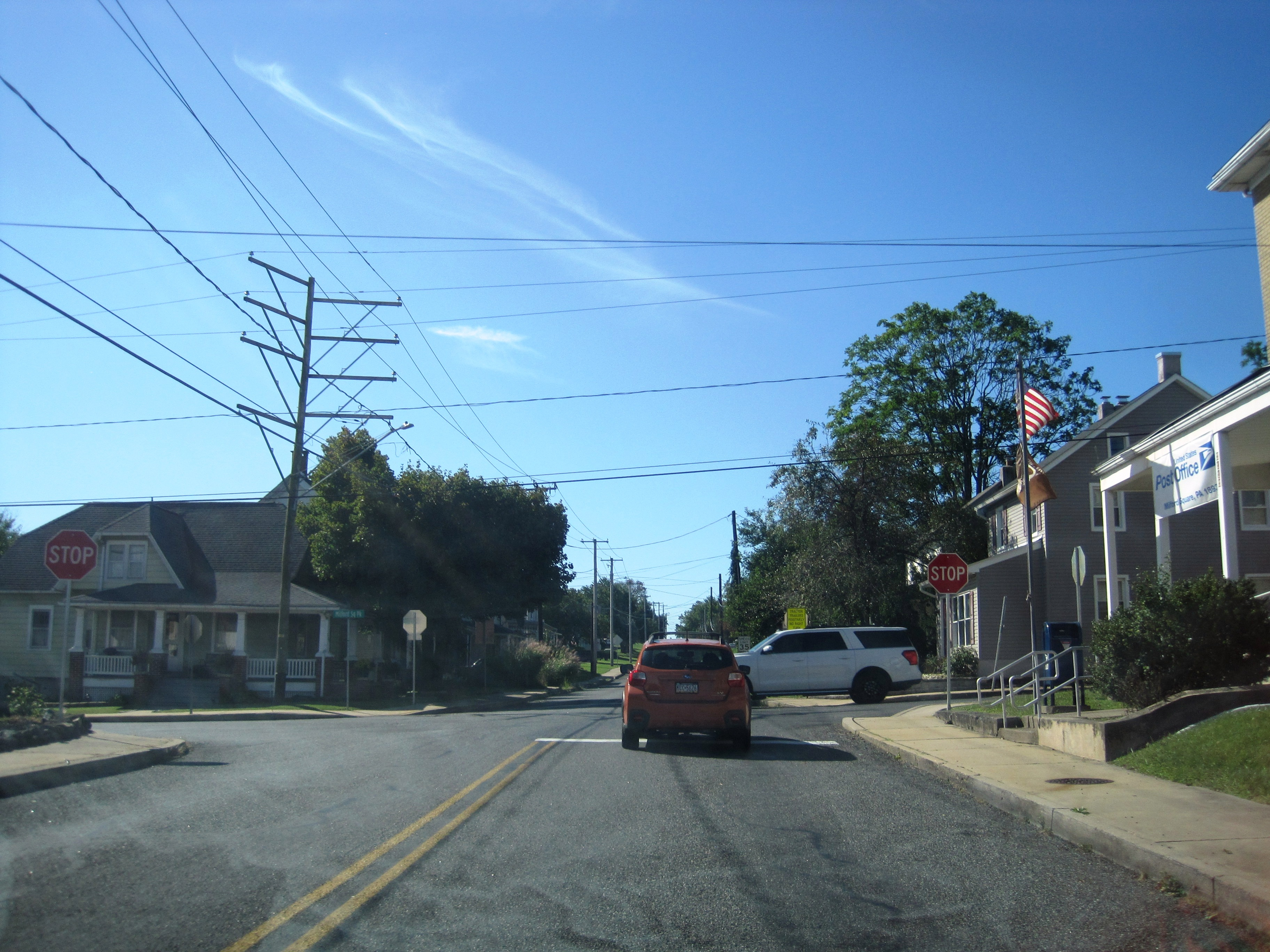
- Allentown Road at Milford Square Pike in Milford Square

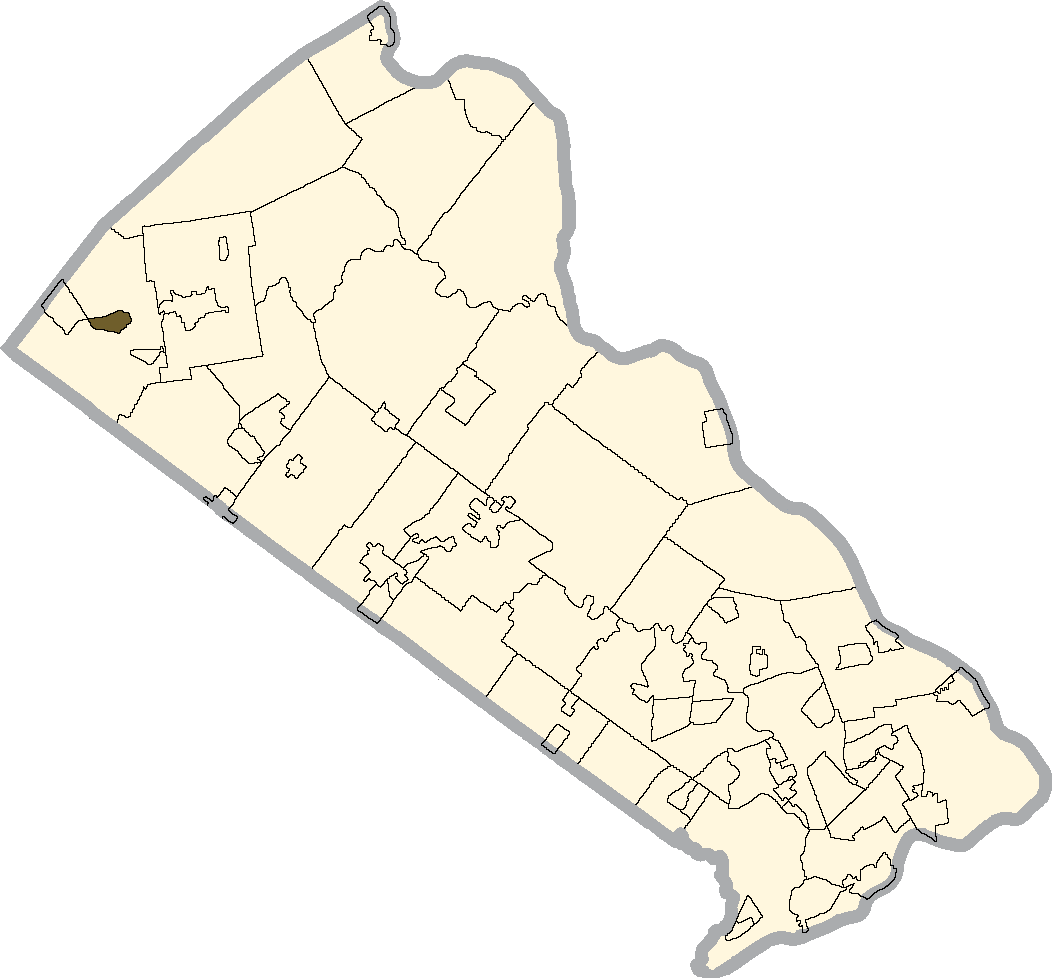
- Location of Milford Square in Bucks County, Pennsylvania

- Location of Milford Square in Pennsylvania Milford Square (the United States)
- Coordinates: 40°26′13″N 75°23′56″W
- Country: United States
- State: Pennsylvania
- County: Bucks
- Township: Milford

Area
  - Total: 0.92 sq mi (2.39 km^{2})
  - Land: 0.92 sq mi (2.38 km^{2})
  - Water: 0 sq mi (0.00 km^{2})

Population (2020)
  - Total: 1,137
  - Density: 1,234.9/sq mi (476.78/km^{2})
- Time zone: UTC-5 (Eastern (EST))
  - Summer (DST): UTC-4 (EDT)
- ZIP Codes: 18935 and 18951
- Area codes: 215, 267 & 445
- FIPS code: 42-49440

Milford Square is a census-designated place in Milford Township, Bucks County, Pennsylvania, United States. It is located along PA Route 663 near the borough of Trumbauersville. As of the 2010 census, the population was 897 residents. While the village has a PO Box post office, with the ZIP code of 18935, the surrounding area uses the Quakertown ZIP Code of 18951.

Milford Square is located on Unami Creek, also known as Swamp Creek, which drains into the Perkiomen Creek. It was formerly known as Heistville, named after the Heist family who operated Achey's Mill and lived in, and greatly renovated, the miller's home.

Campbell's Bridge was listed on the National Register of Historic Places in 1988. It is also home to Achey's Bridge, the first concrete-reinforced bridge in America, which was designed by Henry Mercer and now is located on private property.

Historical population
Census	Pop.	Note	%±
2020	1,137		—
U.S. Decennial Census

== Education ==
It is in the Quakertown Community School District.

== See also ==
- Achey's Mill
