= Bridge in Tredyffrin Township =

- Formerly listed on the U.S. National Register of Historic Places
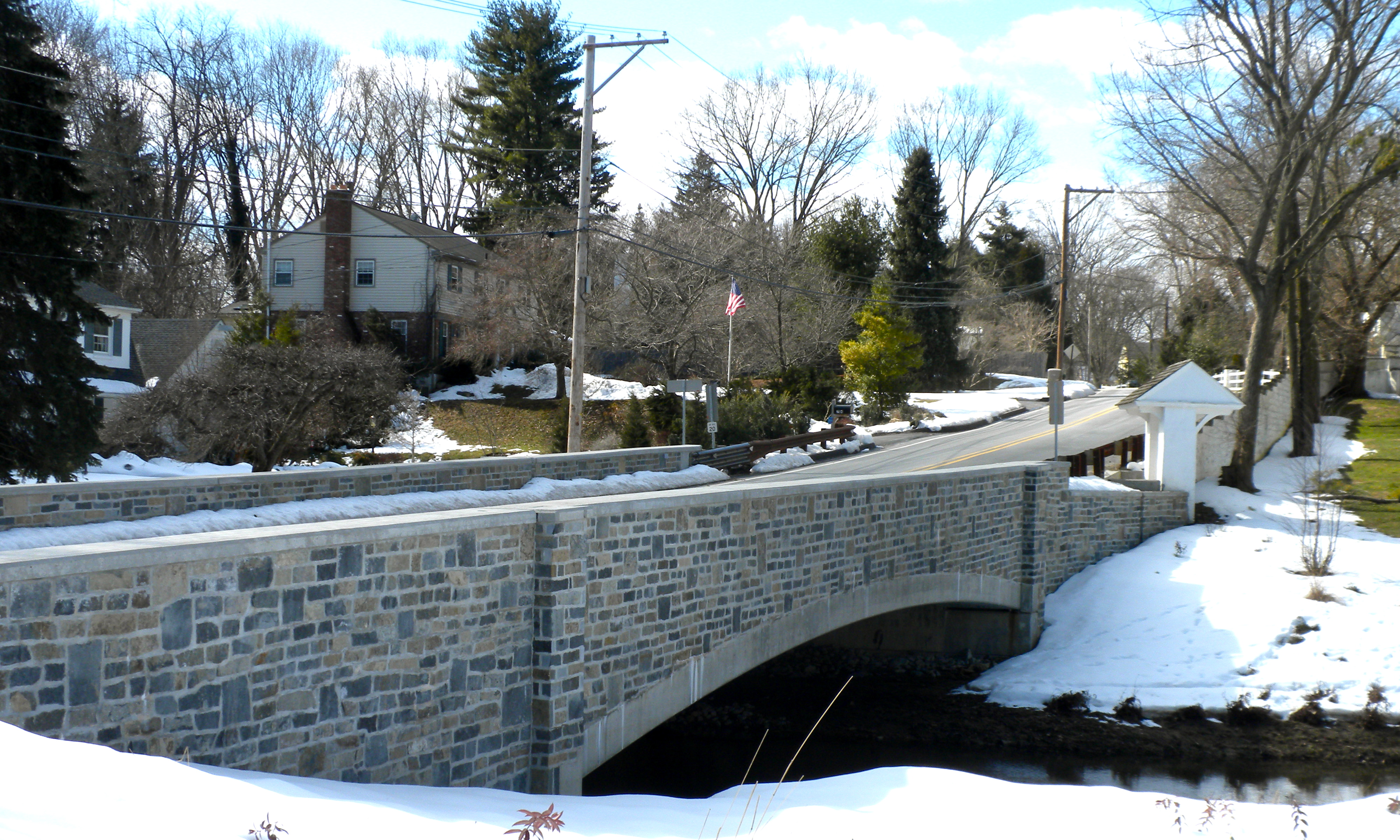
- Replacement bridge, built to resemble the original

- Location within Pennsylvania Location within the United States
- Location: Gulph Road over Trout Creek, Tredyffrin Township, Pennsylvania
- Coordinates: 40°5′31″N 75°25′20″W
- Area: less than one acre
- Architectural style: Closed spandrel arch
- MPS: Highway Bridges Owned by the Commonwealth of Pennsylvania, Department of Transportation TR
- NRHP reference No.: 88000778

Significant dates
- Added to NRHP: June 22, 1988
- Removed from NRHP: July 16, 2010

The Bridge in Tredyffrin Township was a historic stone arch bridge carrying Gulph Road across Trout Creek in Tredyffrin Township, Pennsylvania, USA. It had one span, a solid, semicircular stone arch 27.8 feet (8.5 m) long. There were stone wing walls at each end, with roughly squared stone voussoirs forming the arch ring. The vault of the arch had been sealed with gunite when the bridge was surveyed in 1982, and the parapets had also been topped with concrete. The bridge was built at an unknown date in the late 19th or early 20th century, and was a well-preserved, typical example of stone arch bridge construction in that period.

It was listed on the National Register of Historic Places in 1988. The bridge was replaced in 2008 with a concrete beam bridge finished with a stone facade to resemble the old structure. It was delisted from the National Register in 2010.
