= Bridge Mill Farm =

- U.S. National Register of Historic Places
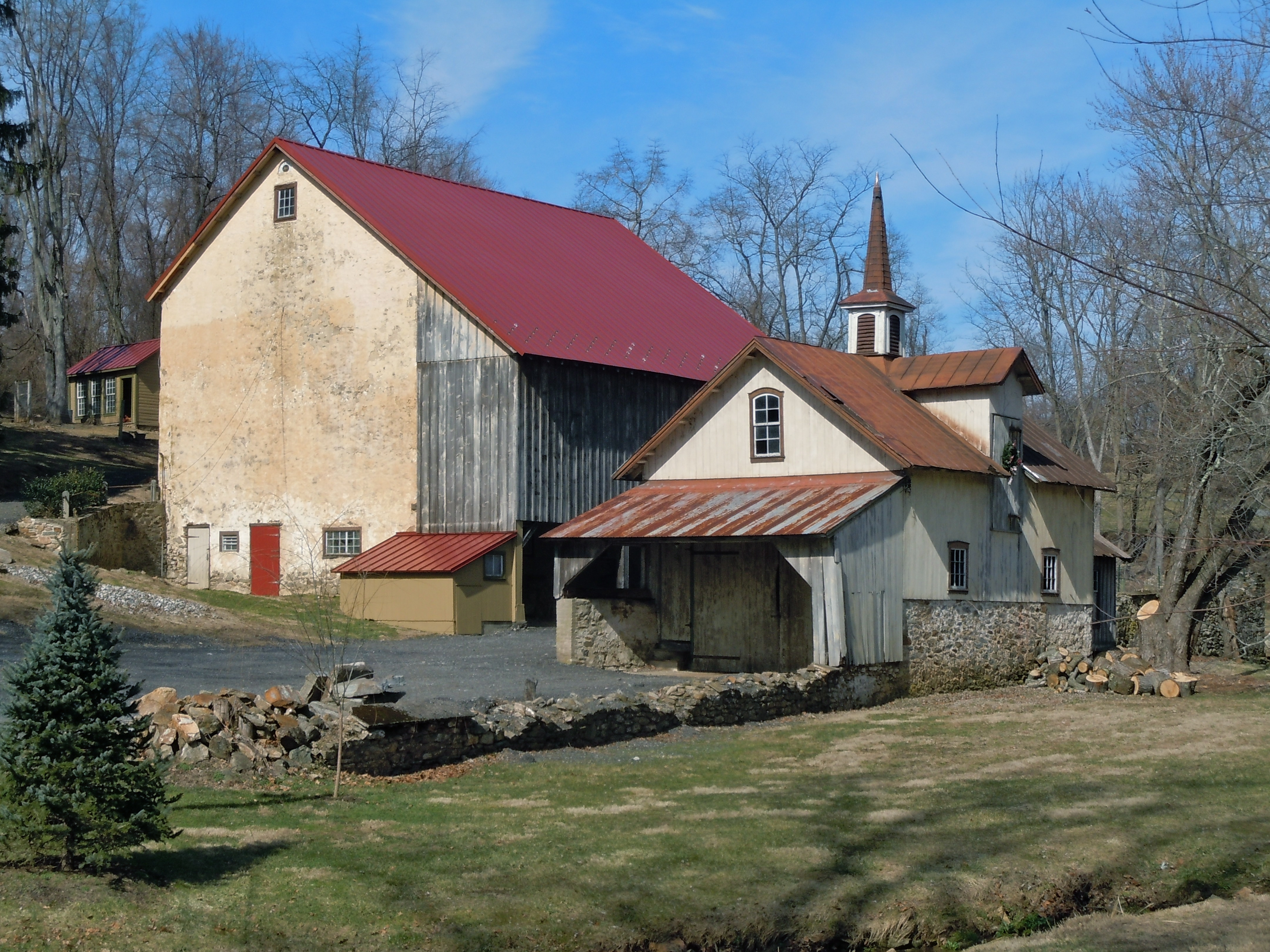
- Bridge Mill Farm, March 2011

- Location within Pennsylvania Location within the United States
- Location: Southwest of Pughtown off Pennsylvania Route 100, East Brandywine Township, Pennsylvania
- Coordinates: 40°03′22″N 75°45′35″W
- Area: 9 acres (3.6 ha)
- Built: 1842
- Architectural style: Italianate
- NRHP reference No.: 83002221
- Added to NRHP: March 9, 1983

Bridge Mill Farm, also known as Bridge Mill Creamery and Marshall Farm, is a historic home and farm located in East Brandywine Township, Chester County, Pennsylvania. The farm has five contributing buildings and two contributing structures. They are a 1 1/2-story stone grist mill dated to the late-18th century, three- to four-story banked farmhouse (1842), three level stone barn, Italianate style outhouse (1842), two-story stone and frame carriage house (c. 1890), cistern, and stone arch bridge (1903).

It was added to the National Register of Historic Places in 1983.
