= Horsham–Montgomery Bridge =

- U.S. National Register of Historic Places
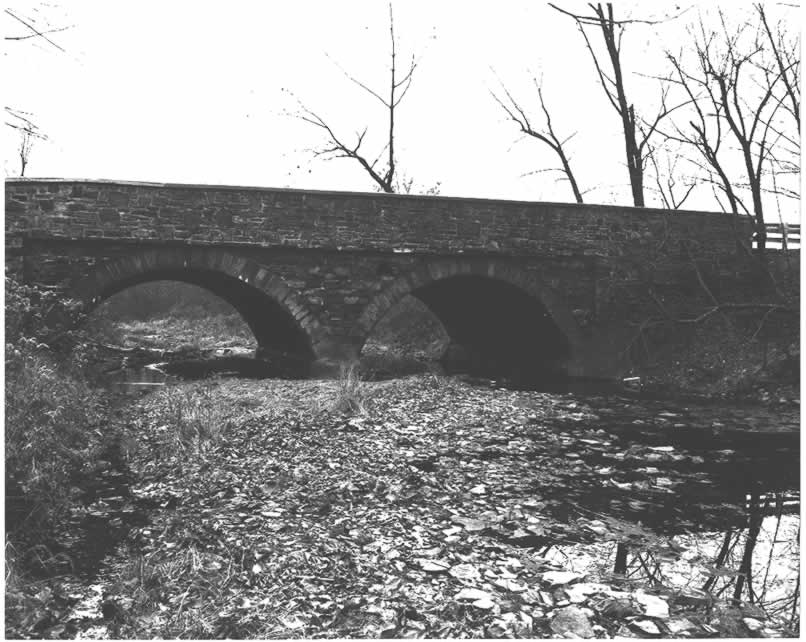

- Location within Pennsylvania Location within the United States
- Location: Horsham and Montgomery Townships; Montgomery County, Pennsylvania, USA
- Coordinates: 40°14′15″N 75°11′31″W
- Built: 1839
- MPS: Highway Bridges Owned by the Commonwealth of Pennsylvania, Department of Transportation TR
- NRHP reference No.: 88000836
- Added to NRHP: June 22, 1988

The Horsham–Montgomery Bridge is an historic stone bridge that carries Pennsylvania Route 152 (Limekiln Pike) over the Little Neshaminy Creek in Montgomery County, Pennsylvania, United States. Lower State Road merges with Limekiln Pike southwest of the bridge, and diverts from it northeast of the bridge. Lower State Road, including its passage over the bridge, forms the border between Horsham and Montgomery Townships.

The Horsham–Montgomery Bridge was listed on the U.S. National Register of Historic Places in 1988.

== History and architectural features ==
Built in 1839, the multiple-span arch bridge is an excellent example of nineteenth-century stone highway bridges. It has two 19.5-foot-long (5.9 m) with an overall length of 125-foot (38 m).
