= Bridge in Ridley Park Borough =

- Formerly listed on the U.S. National Register of Historic Places
- Location within Pennsylvania Location within the United States
- Location: W. Ridley Ave. over Little Crum Creek, Ridley Park, Pennsylvania
- Coordinates: 39°52′32″N 75°19′49″W
- Area: less than one acre
- Architectural style: Single span stone arch
- MPS: Highway Bridges Owned by the Commonwealth of Pennsylvania, Department of Transportation TR
- NRHP reference No.: 88000819

Significant dates
- Added to NRHP: May 10, 1988
- Removed from NRHP: March 1, 1993

The Bridge in Ridley Park Borough was a historic stone arch bridge located at Ridley Park, Pennsylvania. It measured approximately 75-foot-long (23 m), with a single arch span of 24-foot (7.3 m).

Added to the National Register of Historic Places in 1988, this building was delisted in 1993 after being damaged by two storms in 1988 and 1989.
