= Fearnot, Pennsylvania =

Unincorporated community in Pennsylvania

Coordinates: 40°38′38″N 76°38′11″W

Fearnot is an unincorporated community in Schuylkill County, in the U.S. state of Pennsylvania.

== History ==
A post office called Fearnot was established in 1892, and remained in operation until it was discontinued in 1920. The origin of the name Fearnot is obscure. According to tradition, the name "Fearnot" stems from the frequent fighting in the neighborhood; the early townspeople were not afraid of anyone. Captured during the Battle of Trenton Hessian soldier, Johannes Schwalm stayed in the USA after the war. He was held in the Reading, Pa., then later the Carlisle, Pa. POW camps. Toward the end of the war he was an indentured farm hand. He named the little group of houses ‘Fearnot’, as he no longer had to fear the dangers of war. Today the St. Paul’s aka Schwalm Church is among the homes. The source is a personal communication by William C. Carl around 1970. He was a descendant of Johannes Schwalm who grew up in nearby Tower City, Pa. He was a member of the Johannes Schwalm Historical Society
