= Bridge in Heidelberg Township =

- U.S. National Register of Historic Places
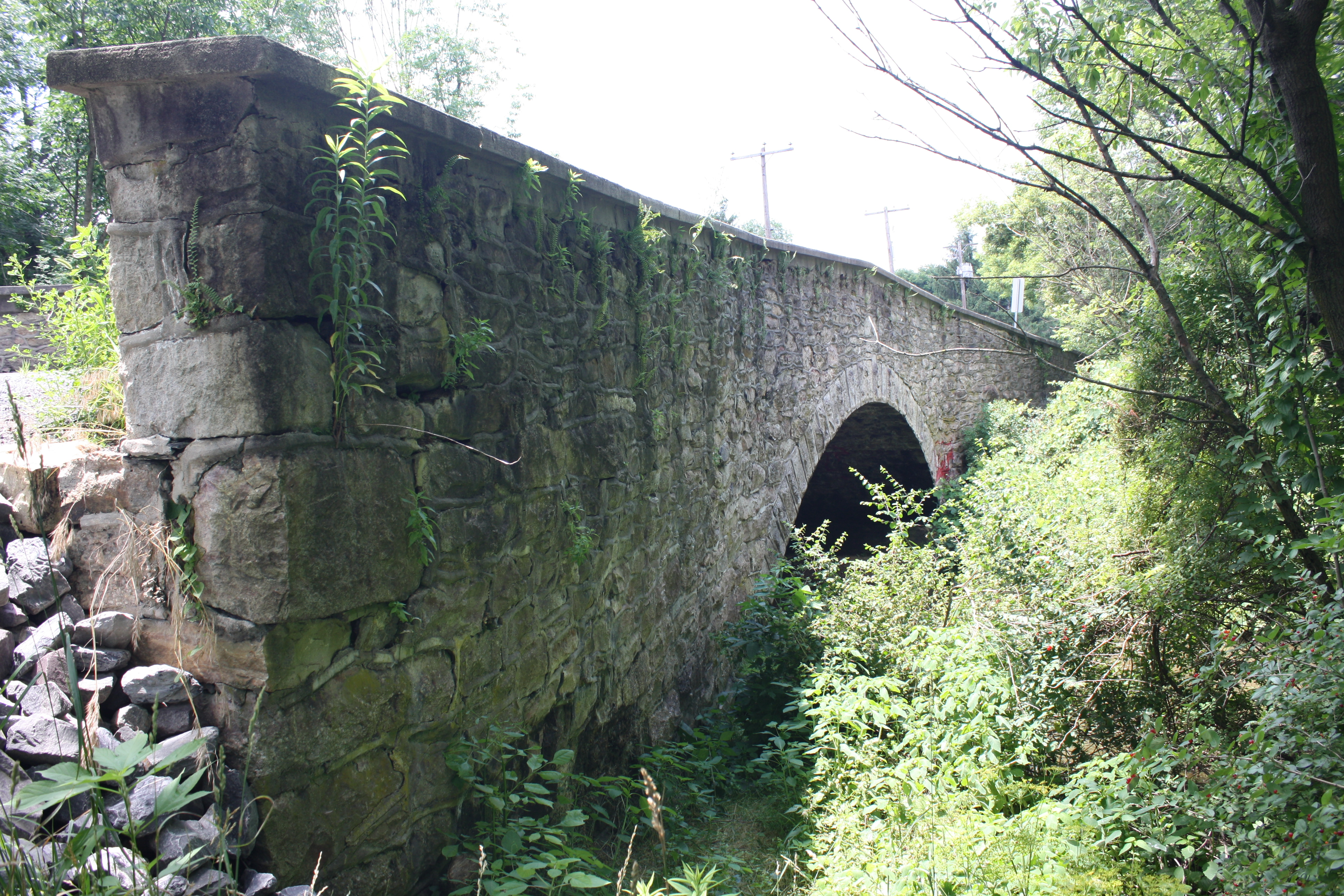
- Bridge in Heidelberg Township. June 2013.

- Location within Pennsylvania Location within the United States
- Location: LR 39110 over branch of Jordan Creek, Heidelberg Township, Pennsylvania
- Coordinates: 40°42′3″N 75°42′37″W
- Area: less than one acre
- Built: 1887
- Architectural style: Single span stone arch
- MPS: Highway Bridges Owned by the Commonwealth of Pennsylvania, Department of Transportation TR
- NRHP reference No.: 88000765
- Added to NRHP: June 22, 1988

Bridge in Heidelberg Township is a historic stone arch bridge located in Germansville at Heidelberg Township, Lehigh County, Pennsylvania. It was built in 1887, and is a 94-foot-long (29 m), single-span bridge, with a single span measuring 32-foot-long (9.8 m). It crosses a branch of Jordan Creek, and carries Memorial Road (QR 4028).

It was listed on the National Register of Historic Places in 1988.
