= Lindbergh Viaduct =

- U.S. National Register of Historic Places
- Lindbergh Viaduct in Reading, Pennsylvania, April 2011

- Location within Pennsylvania Location within the United States
- Location: US 422/Mineral Spring Rd. over Mineral Spring Creek, Reading, Pennsylvania
- Coordinates: 40°19′52″N 75°54′0″W
- Area: 1.3 acres (0.53 ha)
- Built: 1927
- Built by: Whittaker & Diehl
- Architectural style: Open-spandrel arch
- MPS: Highway Bridges Owned by the Commonwealth of Pennsylvania, Department of Transportation TR
- NRHP reference No.: 88000792
- Added to NRHP: June 22, 1988

The Lindbergh Viaduct is a historic concrete arch bridge in Reading in Berks County, Pennsylvania, United States.

It was listed on the National Register of Historic Places in 1988.

It has since been renamed in honor of PFC Lawrence Deisher on August 7, 2025 in a renaming ceremony held on the bridge.

== History and architectural features ==
This historic structure is an 866-foot-long (264 m), open-spandrel concrete arch bridge with thirteen spans. It was built in 1927, and crosses Mineral Spring Creek. Provisionally known as the Mineral Springs Road Viaduct, its name was changed to Lindbergh Viaduct on June 15, 1927 when the Reading City Council dedicated the bridge in honor of famed aviator Charles Lindbergh, who had completed his solo transatlantic flight that year.

There are five main spans, each 83-foot-long (25 m), and eight secondary spans.
