= Bryansville, Pennsylvania =

Unincorporated community in Pennsylvania, US

Coordinates: 39°44′53″N 76°21′11″W

Bryansville is an unincorporated community in York County, Pennsylvania, United States. The village of Bryansville has a large residential area, known as Susquehanna Trails, almost adjacent to it. Until 1978, this community was served by the Maryland and Pennsylvania Railroad at milepost 45.9.
