= Witherup Bridge =

- U.S. National Register of Historic Places
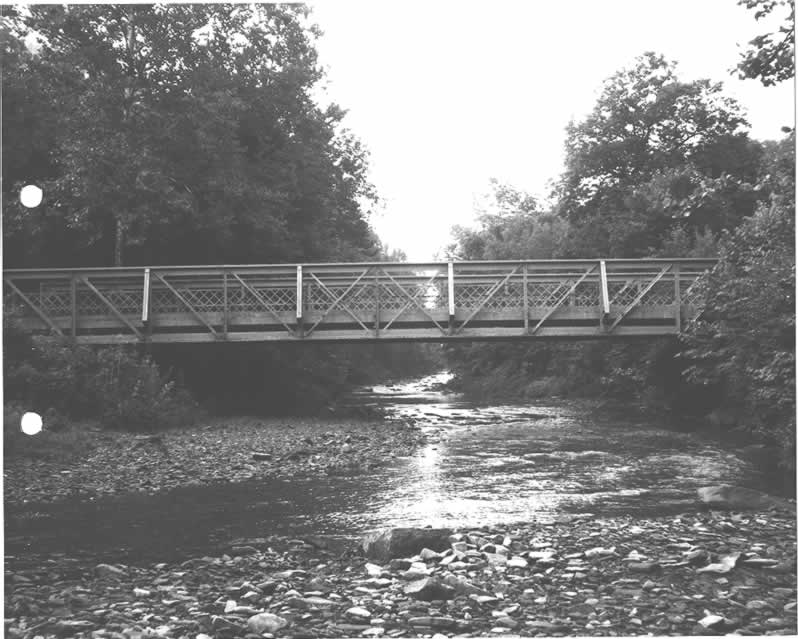
- Witherup Bridge, 1982

- Location within Pennsylvania Location within the United States
- Location: State Route 3007 over Scrubgrass Creek, south of Kennerdell, Clinton Township, Pennsylvania
- Coordinates: 41°15′18″N 79°50′27″W
- Area: less than one acre
- Built: 1906
- Built by: Canton Bridge Co.
- Architectural style: Pratt pony truss
- MPS: Highway Bridges Owned by the Commonwealth of Pennsylvania, Department of Transportation TR
- NRHP reference No.: 88000800
- Added to NRHP: June 22, 1988

Witherup Bridge is a historic Pratt pony truss bridge located in Clinton Township, Venango County, Pennsylvania. It was built by the Canton Bridge Company in 1906. It measures 86-foot-long (26 m) and crosses the Scrubgrass Creek.

It was listed on the National Register of Historic Places in 1988.
