= Ridge Avenue Bridge in Philadelphia =

- U.S. National Register of Historic Places
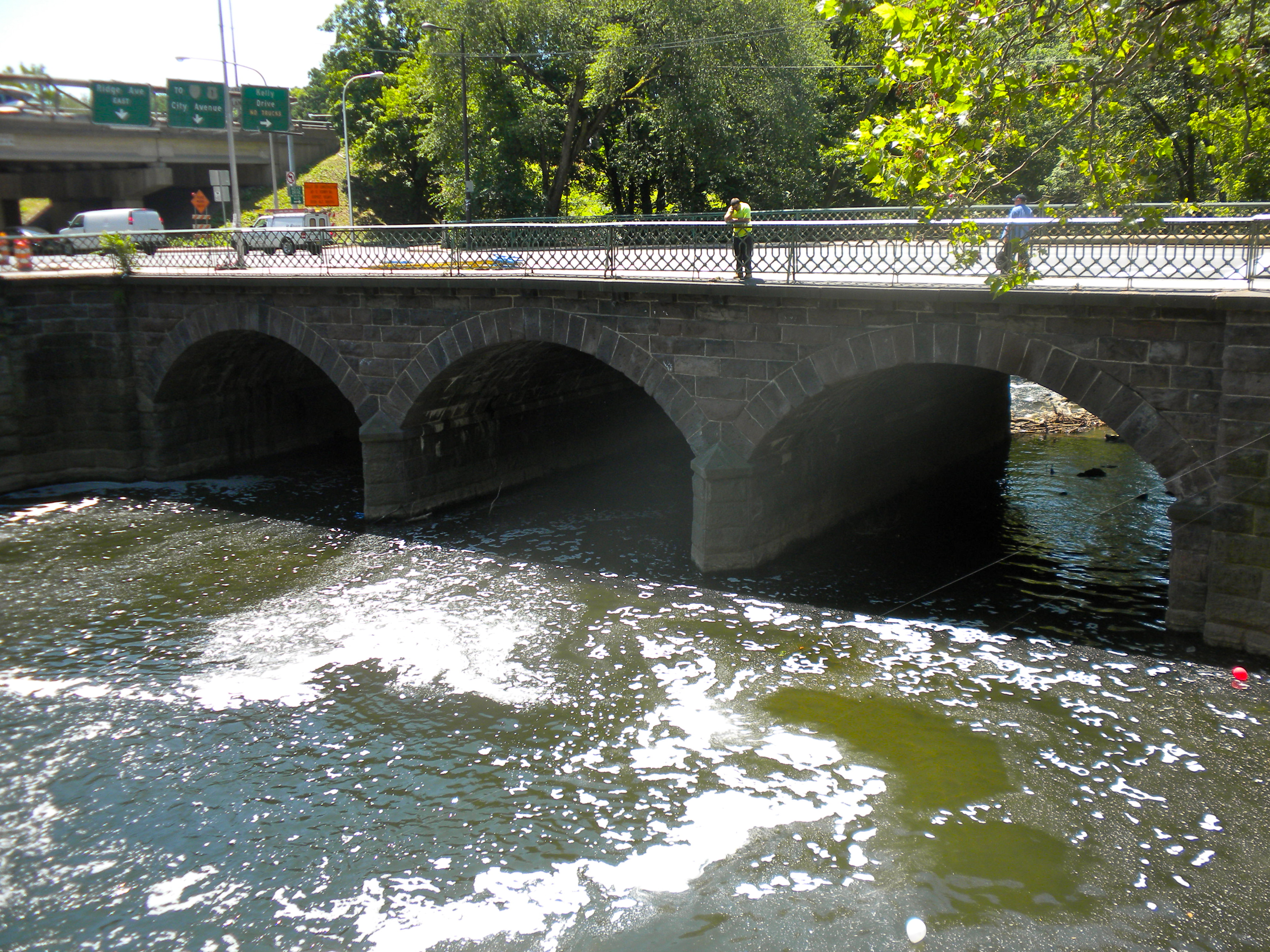

- Location within Philadelphia Location within Pennsylvania Location within the United States
- Location: Ridge Ave. over Wissahickon Creek, Philadelphia, Pennsylvania
- Coordinates: 40°0′53″N 75°12′26″W
- Area: less than one acre
- Built: 1888
- Architectural style: Multi-span stone arch
- MPS: Highway Bridges Owned by the Commonwealth of Pennsylvania, Department of Transportation TR
- NRHP reference No.: 88000852
- Added to NRHP: June 22, 1988

The Ridge Avenue Bridge in Philadelphia is a historic bridge in Philadelphia, Pennsylvania.

A triple-span stone arch bridge built in 1888, it carries Ridge Avenue over the Wissahickon Creek. It is the last crossing of the creek before it empties into the Schuylkill River. Four other stone arch bridges cross the Wissahickon. The 119.1-ft-long bridge was rehabilitated in 1954.

The bridge was added to the National Register of Historic Places in 1988.
