= Frantz's Bridge =

- U.S. National Register of Historic Places
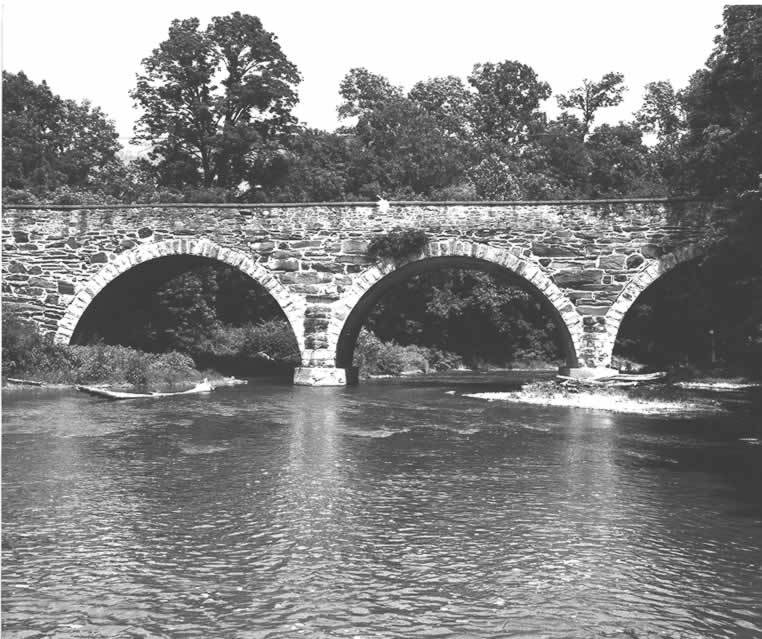
- Frantz's Bridge, c. 1982

- Location within Pennsylvania Location within the United States
- Location: Legislative Route 39060 over Jordan Creek, Lowhill Township, Pennsylvania
- Coordinates: 40°39′3″N 75°39′2″W
- Area: less than one acre
- Built: 1887
- Architectural style: Multi-span stone arch
- MPS: Highway Bridges Owned by the Commonwealth of Pennsylvania, Department of Transportation TR
- NRHP reference No.: 88000771
- Added to NRHP: June 22, 1988

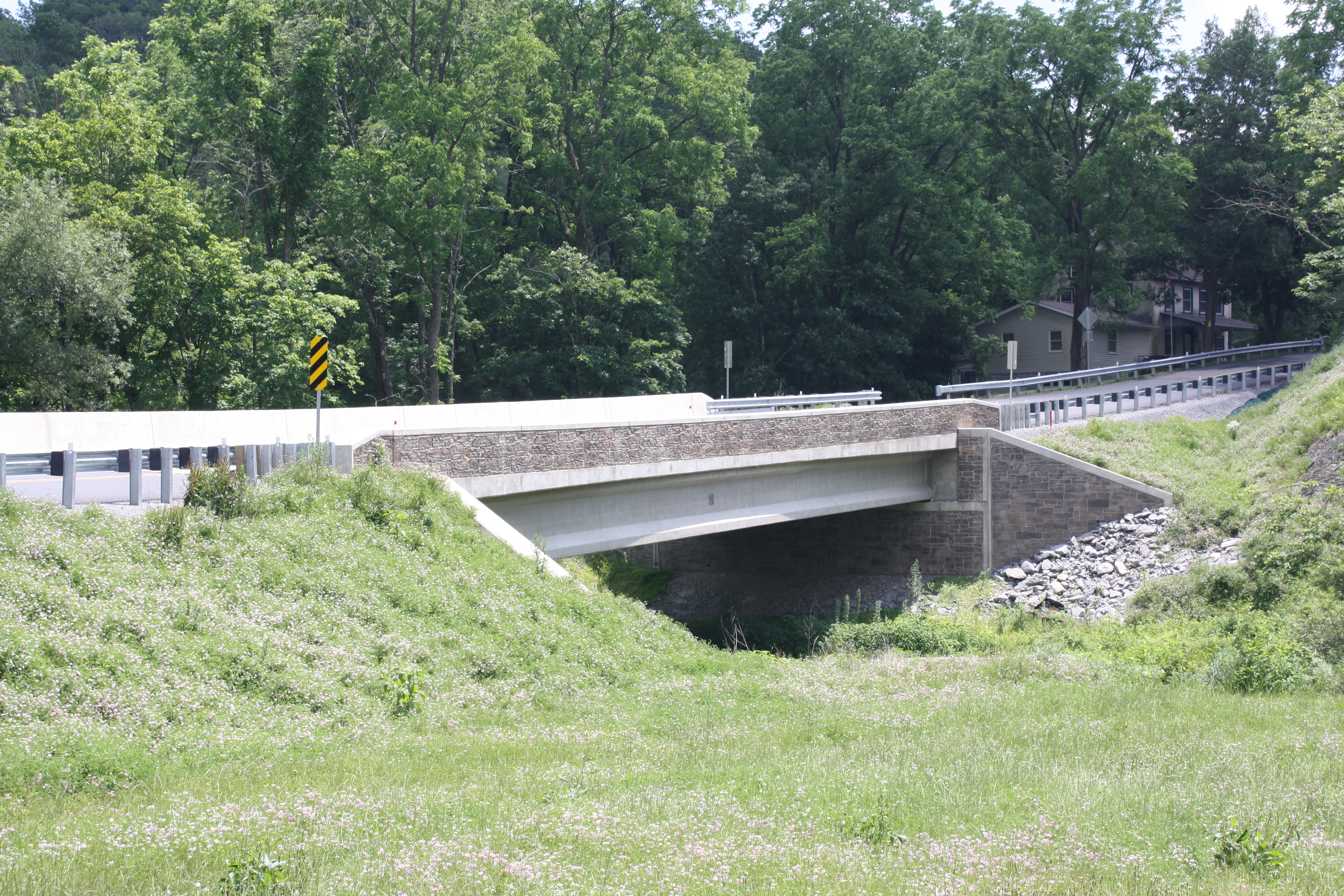
Kistler Road bridge over Jordan Creek that replaced demolished Frantz's Bridge in June 2013

Frantz's Bridge was a historic stone arch bridge located at Lowhill Township, Lehigh County, Pennsylvania. It was built in 1887, and is a 166-foot-long (51 m), multiple-span bridge, with three spans each measuring 32 feet (9.8 m) long. It crossed Jordan Creek.

It was listed on the National Register of Historic Places in 1988. In 2011, the bridge was replaced with a concrete one-span bridge.
