= Landenberg, Pennsylvania =

Unincorporated community in Pennsylvania, US

- Unincorporated community
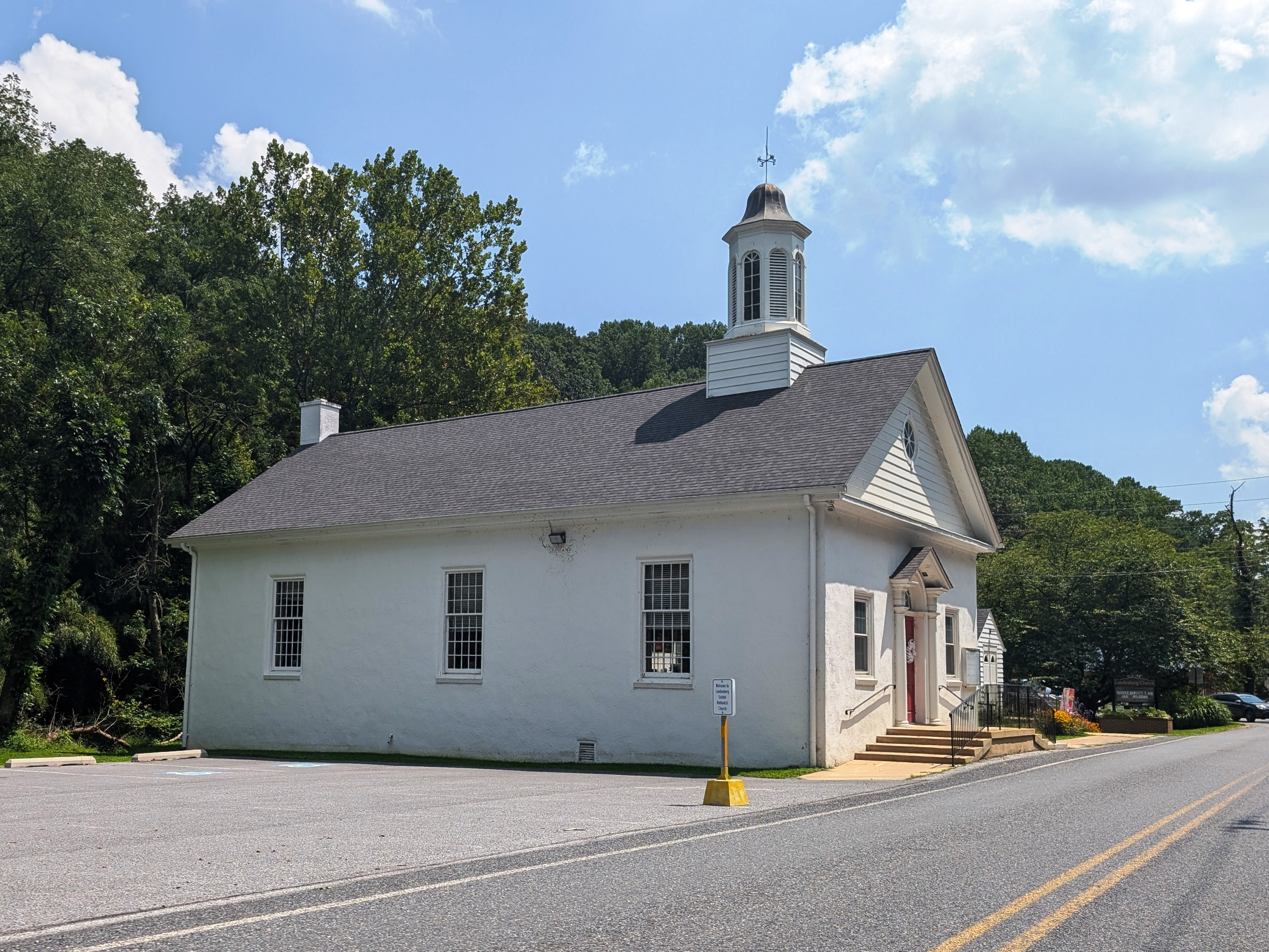
- Landenberg United Methodist Church
- Motto: You can't get there from here (unofficial)
- Location of Landenberg in Pennsylvania Landenberg (the United States)
- Coordinates: 39°46′38″N 75°46′17″W
- Country: United States
- State: Pennsylvania
- County: Chester
- Township: New Garden

Population
  - Total: 11,757
- Time zone: UTC-5 (EST)
  - Summer (DST): UTC-4 (EDT)
- ZIP code: 19350
- Area codes: 610 and 484

Landenberg is an unincorporated community that is located in southern Chester County, Pennsylvania, United States. It is, essentially, a post office address that covers parts of New Garden, London Britain and Franklin Townships.

The White Clay Creek (and preserve) bisects Landenberg, which also falls into two school districts: Avon Grove and Kennett Consolidated.

== History and notable features ==
Landenberg was named for Martin Landenberger, who operated a mill there. It once had a railroad station that was shared between the Pennsylvania Railroad and the Delaware Western Railroad, a system acquired by the Baltimore and Ohio Railroad. There are several historical areas in Landenberg, including the Landenberg community (store, church, apartments, hotel) and the Ticking Tomb along with the bridge in New Garden Township.

Formerly part of the range of the Lenape tribe of Native Americans, the White Clay Creek runs through Landenberg, eventually entering the nearby White Clay Creek Preserve. Landenberg's proximity to the White Clay Creek Preserve makes this area a favorite for local fisherman, hikers, bikers and outdoorsmen. White Clay Creek Preserve backs up to the White Clay Creek State Park in Delaware.

Landenberg is also home to many business people who commute to work in the nearby city of Wilmington, Delaware.

== Climate ==
Climate data for Landenberg, Pennsylvania
Month	Jan	Feb	Mar	Apr	May	Jun	Jul	Aug	Sep	Oct	Nov	Dec	Year
Record high °F (°C)	75 (24)	79 (26)	89 (32)	94 (34)	97 (36)	100 (38)	105 (41)	103 (39)	100 (38)	90 (32)	85 (29)	75 (24)	105 (41)
Mean daily maximum °F (°C)	41 (5)	45 (7)	55 (13)	66 (19)	76 (24)	84 (29)	88 (31)	85 (29)	79 (26)	68 (20)	57 (14)	46 (8)	66 (19)
Mean daily minimum °F (°C)	23 (−5)	25 (−4)	32 (0)	41 (5)	51 (11)	60 (16)	65 (18)	64 (18)	57 (14)	44 (7)	34 (1)	28 (−2)	44 (7)
Record low °F (°C)	−10 (−23)	−8 (−22)	4 (−16)	14 (−10)	28 (−2)	38 (3)	41 (5)	42 (6)	33 (1)	23 (−5)	12 (−11)	−6 (−21)	−10 (−23)
Average precipitation inches (mm)	3.47 (88)	2.73 (69)	4.04 (103)	3.53 (90)	4.41 (112)	4.06 (103)	4.49 (114)	4.01 (102)	4.28 (109)	3.38 (86)	3.39 (86)	3.56 (90)	45.35 (1,152)
Average snowfall inches (cm)	5.7 (14)	4.4 (11)	1.2 (3.0)	0 (0)	0 (0)	0 (0)	0 (0)	0 (0)	0 (0)	0 (0)	0.4 (1.0)	2.3 (5.8)	14 (34.8)
