= Hempfield Township, Mercer County, Pennsylvania =

Township in Pennsylvania, US

Coordinates: 41°25′00″N 80°22′35″W

- Township
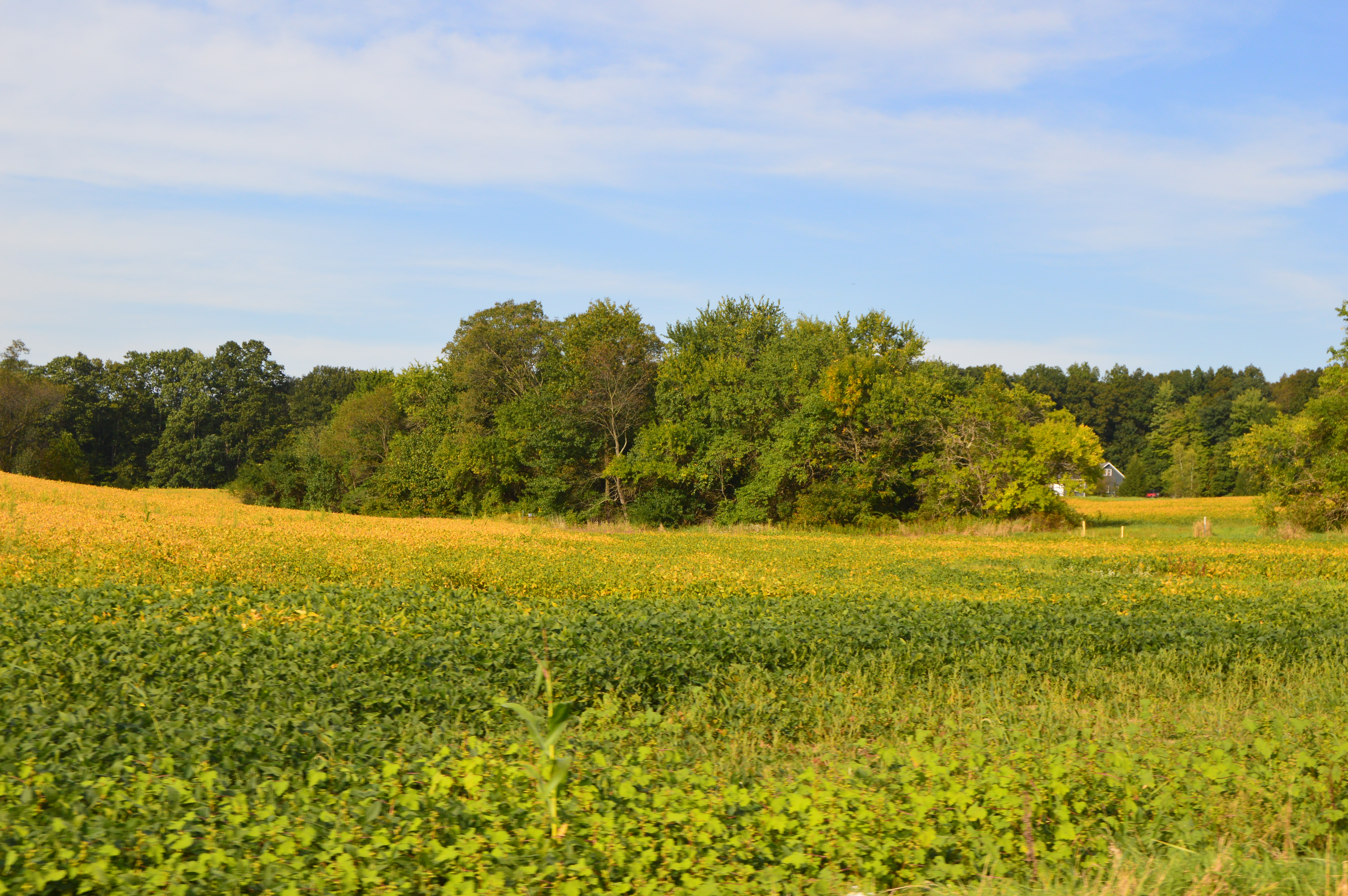
- Soybean field on Wasser Bridge Road

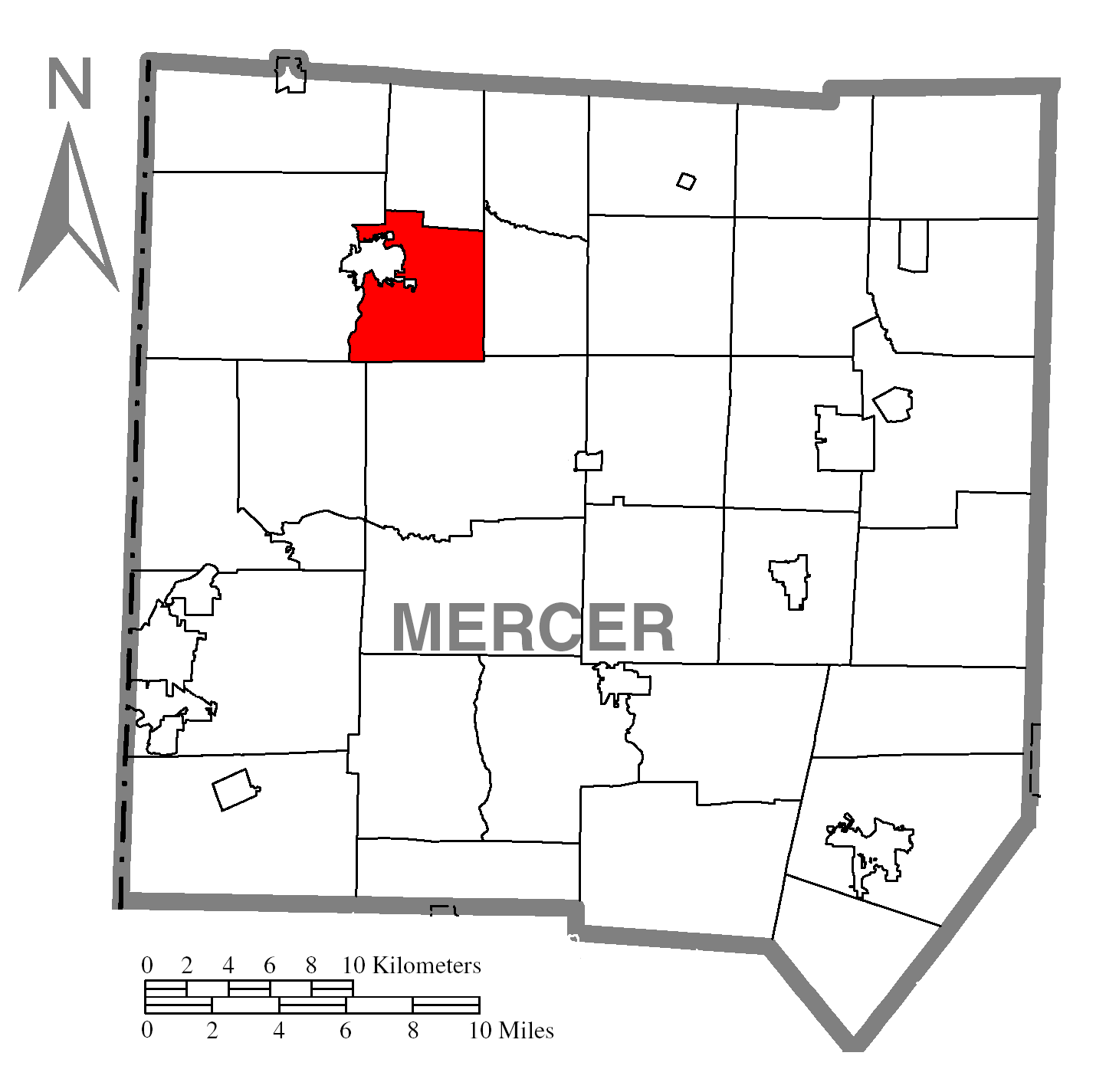
- Location of Hempfield Township in Mercer County

- Location of Mercer County in Pennsylvania
- Country: United States
- State: Pennsylvania
- County: Mercer

Area
  - Total: 14.18 sq mi (36.72 km^{2})
  - Land: 14.15 sq mi (36.65 km^{2})
  - Water: 0.031 sq mi (0.08 km^{2})

Population (2020)
  - Total: 3,732
  - Estimate (2023): 3,651
  - Density: 259.2/sq mi (100.08/km^{2})
- Time zone: UTC-4 (EST)
  - Summer (DST): UTC-5 (EDT)
- Area code: 724
- FIPS code: 42-085-33784
- Website: https://hempfieldtownshipmc.com/

Historical population
Census	Pop.	Note	%±
2000	4,004		—
2010	3,741		−6.6%
2020	3,732		−0.2%
2023 (est.)	3,651		−2.2%
U.S. Decennial Census

Hempfield Township is a township in Mercer County, Pennsylvania, United States. The population was 3,734 at the 2020 census, a decline from the figure of 3,741 in 2010.

== History ==
The Quaker Bridge was listed on the National Register of Historic Places in 1988.

== Geography ==
According to the United States Census Bureau, the township has a total area of 14.2 square miles (37 km^{2}), of which 14.1 square miles (37 km^{2}) is land and 0.04 square miles (0.10 km^{2}) (0.28%) is water.

== Demographics ==
As of the census of 2000, there were 4,004 people, 1,590 households, and 1,160 families residing in the township. The population density was 283.0 inhabitants per square mile (109.3/km^{2}). There were 1,646 housing units at an average density of 116.3 per square mile (44.9/km^{2}). The racial makeup of the township was 98.70% White, 0.27% African American, 0.07% Native American, 0.50% Asian, 0.02% from other races, and 0.42% from two or more races. Hispanic or Latino of any race were 0.37% of the population.

There were 1,590 households, out of which 27.9% had children under the age of 18 living with them, 64.2% were married couples living together, 6.0% had a female householder with no husband present, and 27.0% were non-families. 24.3% of all households were made up of individuals, and 14.4% had someone living alone who was 65 years of age or older. The average household size was 2.41 and the average family size was 2.85.

In the township the population was spread out, with 21.5% under the age of 18, 5.1% from 18 to 24, 22.3% from 25 to 44, 26.0% from 45 to 64, and 25.1% who were 65 years of age or older. The median age was 46 years. For every 100 females there were 92.3 males. For every 100 females age 18 and over, there were 87.1 males.

The median income for a household in the township was $38,396, and the median income for a family was $47,008. Males had a median income of $35,183 versus $21,615 for females. The per capita income for the township was $20,169. About 4.6% of families and 7.8% of the population were below the poverty line, including 8.7% of those under age 18 and 7.5% of those age 65 or over.
