= Landenberg Bridge =

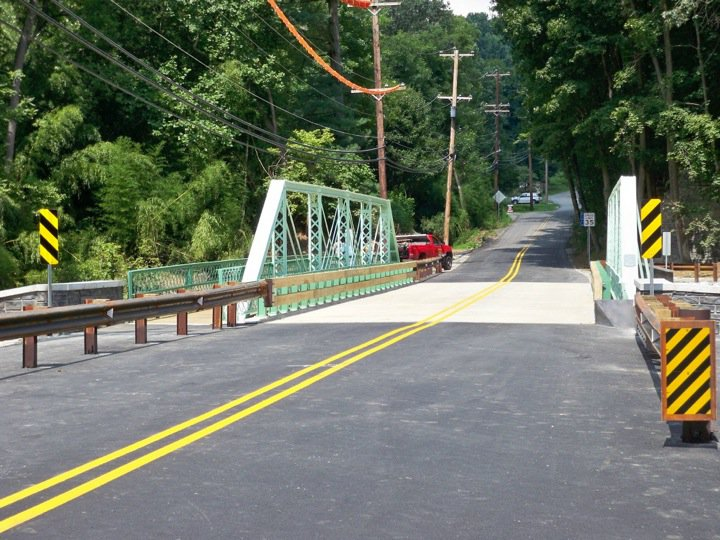
- The new bridge, just after completion in July 2010
- Coordinates: 39°46′40.9″N 75°46′16.3″W
- Carries: Landenberg Road
- Crosses: White Clay Creek
- Locale: Chester, Pennsylvania, United States
- Other name: Bridge in New Garden Township
- Maintained by: PennDOT

Characteristics
- Total length: 76.5 ft (23.3 m)
- Width: 18 ft (5.5 m)

History
- Constructed by: Schuylkill Bridge Company
- Opened: 1899
- Landenberg Bridge
- Formerly listed on the U.S. National Register of Historic Places
- NRHP reference No.: 88000804

Significant dates
- Added to NRHP: June 22, 1988
- Removed from NRHP: March 23, 2010

Location
- Interactive map of Landenberg Bridge

The Landenberg Bridge is a truss bridge carrying Landenberg Road across the White Clay Creek in Landenberg, Pennsylvania.

The bridge was originally built by the Schuylkill Bridge Company of Phoenixville, Pennsylvania in 1899, using the stone abutments from an earlier (1871) bridge. The 1899 bridge was a Pratt pony truss design, with an unusual cantilevered sidewalk along the north side of the bridge.

Because of its architectural features, the Landenberg Bridge was placed on the National Register of Historic Places in 1988. However, a PennDOT inspection in the summer of 1999 found that the bridge had undergone serious structural deterioration, and it was immediately closed to traffic. Due to local opposition to widening the bridge, replacement did not begin until 2009, after a compromise was reached to reuse elements of the old bridge in the replacement span and to construct the new span no wider than the roadway. Doing this meant that New Garden Township had to agree to assume control of maintaining the bridge from PennDOT, due to the bridge being narrower than what state design specifications required. The bridge was removed from the National Register of Historic Places on March 23, 2010 as the truss system changed from being functional on the original span to ornamental on the new span, which is a simple concrete beam bridge. The new span opened to traffic on July 25, 2010.

== Gallery ==
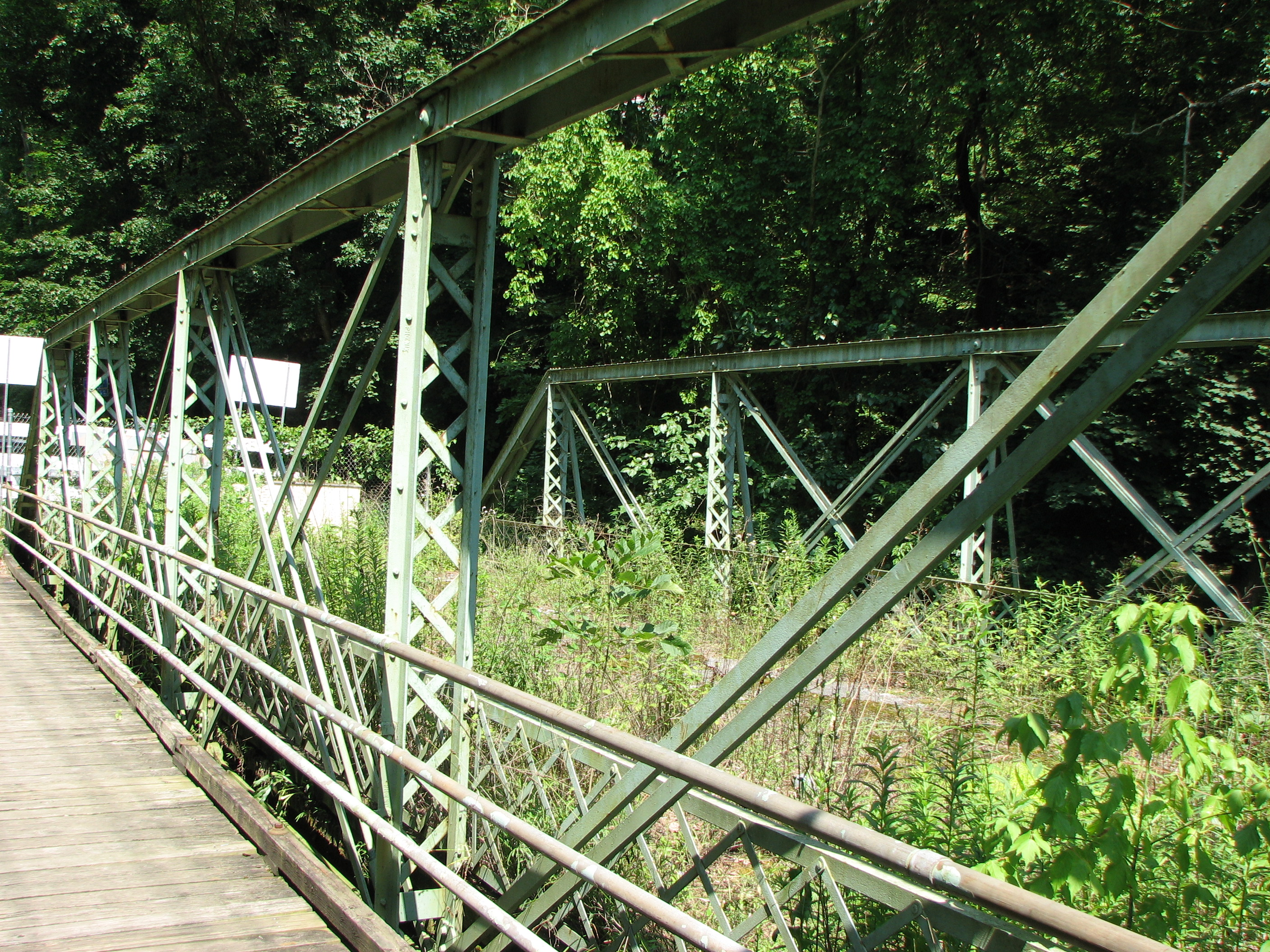
The deteriorating old bridge in 2008
