= Quaker Bridge =

- U.S. National Register of Historic Places
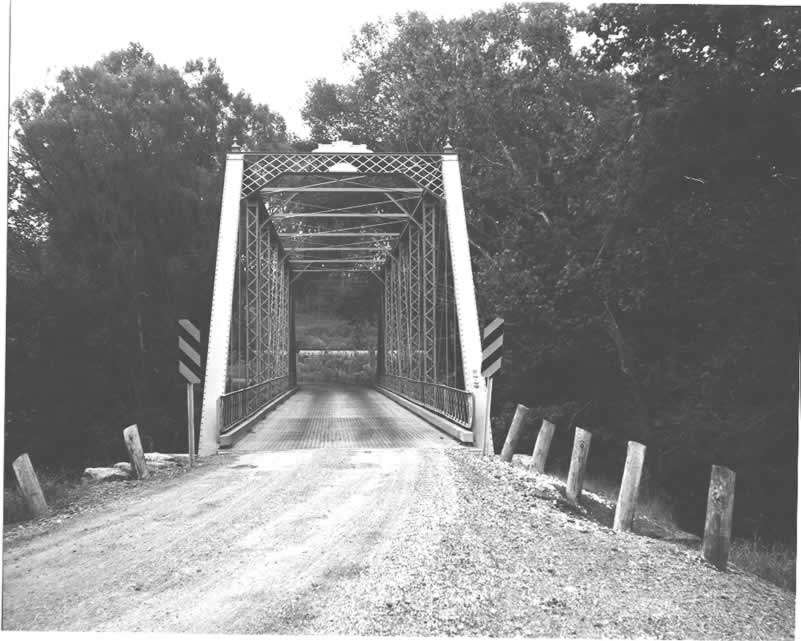
- Quaker Bridge, 1982

- Location within Pennsylvania Location within the United States
- Location: Legislative Route 43135 over the Little Shenango River near Greenville Hempfield Township, Pennsylvania
- Coordinates: 41°25′33″N 80°22′22″W
- Area: less than one acre
- Built: 1898
- Built by: J.R. Gemmell; Cleveland Bridge & Engineering Company
- Architectural style: Pratt through truss
- MPS: Highway Bridges Owned by the Commonwealth of Pennsylvania, Department of Transportation TR
- NRHP reference No.: 88000863
- Added to NRHP: June 22, 1988

Quaker Bridge is a historic steel Pratt truss bridge located in Hempfield Township, Mercer County, Pennsylvania. It was built in 1898 by the Cleveland Bridge & Engineering Company, and is a 124-foot-long (38 m) bridge with a single span. It crosses Little Shenango River.

It was listed on the National Register of Historic Places in 1988.
