= List of bridges documented by the Historic American Engineering Record in Pennsylvania =

The following bridges in Pennsylvania are documented by the Historic American Engineering Record.

== Bridges ==
Survey No.	Name (as assigned by HAER)	Status	Type	Built	Documented	Carries	Crosses	Location	County	Coordinates
NY-66	New York, Ontario and Western Railroad, Delaware River Bridge	Demolished	Warren truss		1971	New York, Ontario and Western Railway (former)	Delaware River	Buckingham Township, Pennsylvania, and Hancock, New York	Wayne County, Pennsylvania, and Delaware County, New York	41°57′16″N 75°17′56″W
NY-79	Lordville Suspension Bridge	Replaced	Suspension	1904	1971	SR 1023 (Lordville Road)	Delaware River	Equinunk, Pennsylvania, and Lordville, New York	Wayne County, Pennsylvania, and Delaware County, New York	41°52′04″N 75°12′50″W
PA-1	Delaware Aqueduct	Extant	Suspension	1847	1969	Delaware and Hudson Canal (former)	Delaware River	Lackawaxen, Pennsylvania, and Minisink Ford, New York	Pike County, Pennsylvania, and Sullivan County, New York	41°28′57″N 74°59′04″W
PA-2	Smithfield Street Bridge	Extant	Lenticular truss	1883	1974	Smithfield Street	Monongahela River	Pittsburgh	Allegheny	40°26′05″N 80°00′08″W
PA-3	Brady Street Bridge	Replaced	Steel tied arch	1896	1973	South 22nd Street	Monongahela River	Pittsburgh	Allegheny	40°26′00″N 79°58′25″W
PA-4	North Side Point Bridge	Demolished	Pennsylvania truss	1915	1973		Allegheny River	Pittsburgh	Allegheny	40°26′37″N 80°00′46″W
PA-5	Point Bridge	Demolished	Steel tied arch	1927	1973		Monongahela River	Pittsburgh	Allegheny	40°26′27″N 80°00′52″W
PA-6	Erie Railway, Delaware Division, Bridge 189.46	Extant	Stone arch	1848	1971	New York, Susquehanna and Western Railway	Starrucca Creek	Lanesboro	Susquehanna	41°57′46″N 75°35′00″W
PA-7	Erie Railway, Bradford Division, Bridge 27.66	Ruin	Trestle	1882	1971		Kinzua Creek	Mount Jewett	McKean	41°45′45″N 78°35′19″W
PA-15	Dingman's Ferry Bridge	Extant	Baltimore truss	1900	1971	PA 739 and CR 560	Delaware River	Dingmans Ferry and Sandyston Township	Pike County, Pennsylvania and Sussex County, New Jersey	41°13′12″N 74°51′33″W
PA-16	Erie Railway, Delaware Division, Bridge 190.13	Extant	Reinforced concrete open-spandrel arch	1930	1971	Norfolk Southern Railway	PA 171 (South Main Street)	Lanesboro	Susquehanna	41°57′16″N 75°35′09″W
PA-17	Erie Railway, Delaware Division, Culvert 190.21	Extant	Reinforced concrete closed-spandrel arch	1930	1971	Norfolk Southern Railway	Canawacta Creek	Lanesboro	Susquehanna	41°57′15″N 75°35′11″W
PA-18	Erie Railway, Cascade Bridge	Replaced by embankment			1971	Norfolk Southern Railway	Cascade Creek	Lanesboro	Susquehanna	41°59′24″N 75°35′31″W
PA-19	Mead Avenue Bridge	Replaced	Whipple truss	1872	1971	Mead Avenue	French Creek	Meadville	Crawford	41°38′16″N 80°09′45″W
PA-22	Pennsylvania Railroad, Allegheny River Bridge	Extant	Parker truss	1932	1971	Western New York and Pennsylvania Railroad	Allegheny River	Oil City and Cranberry Township	Venango	41°25′21″N 79°41′52″W
PA-23	Erie Railway, Delaware River Bridge	Extant	Pratt truss		1971	Central New York Railroad	Delaware River	Millrift, Pennsylvania and Deerpark, New York	Pike County, Pennsylvania, and Orange County, New York	41°24′23″N 74°44′29″W
PA-24	Erie Railway, Delaware Division, Bridge 110.54	Extant	Pratt truss	1894	2000	Central New York Railroad	Lackawaxen River	Lackawaxen	Pike	41°29′13″N 74°59′21″W
PA-27	Erie Railway, Diverging French Creek Bridges	Extant	Lattice truss		1971	Western New York and Pennsylvania Railroad	French Creek	Cambridge Springs	Crawford	41°49′55″N 79°58′41″W
PA-28	Erie Railway, Parallel French Creek Bridges	Extant	Lattice truss		1971	Western New York and Pennsylvania Railroad	French Creek	Cambridge Springs	Crawford	41°48′18″N 80°02′22″W
PA-31	Delaware River Bridge	Extant	Suspension	1904	1970	Delaware Road	Delaware River	Riegelsville, Pennsylvania, and Riegelsville, New Jersey	Bucks County, Pennsylvania, and Warren County, New Jersey	40°35′39″N 75°11′27″W
PA-34	Pennsylvania Railroad, Erie Railway Bridge	Extant	Parker truss		1970	Pennsylvania Railroad (former)	Erie Railway	Corry	Erie	41°53′59″N 79°43′13″W
PA-35	Falls Bridge	Extant	Baltimore truss	1895	1999		Schuylkill River	Philadelphia	Philadelphia	40°00′30″N 75°11′54″W
PA-36	Philadelphia and Reading Railroad, Wissahickon Creek Viaduct	Extant	Stone arch	1882	2000	SEPTA Manayunk/Norristown Line	Wissahickon Creek	Philadelphia	Philadelphia	40°00′56″N 75°12′23″W
PA-37	Connecting Railway, Schuylkill River Bridge	Extant	Stone arch	1867	2000	Amtrak Northeast Corridor, etc.	Schuylkill River	Philadelphia	Philadelphia	39°58′35″N 75°11′38″W
PA-38	Pennsylvania Railroad, West Philadelphia Elevated	Extant	Brick arch	1903	2000	CSX Harrisburg Subdivision	Market Street, etc.	Philadelphia	Philadelphia	39°57′18″N 75°11′07″W
PA-39	Philadelphia and Reading Railroad Schuylkill River Viaduct	Extant	Stone arch	1856	2000	CSX Trenton Subdivision	Schuylkill River	Philadelphia	Philadelphia	40°00′23″N 75°11′34″W
PA-43	Erie Railway, Shohola Creek Bridge	Extant	Steel built-up girder		1971	Central New York Railroad	Shohola Creek	Shohola Township	Pike	41°28′20″N 74°54′46″W
PA-53	Sewickley Bridge	Replaced	Cantilever	1911	1978	SR 4025	Ohio River	Sewickley and Moon Township	Allegheny	40°31′59″N 80°11′16″W
PA-54	West Marshall Street Bridge	Replaced	Stone arch	1854	1979	Marshall Street	Stony Creek	Norristown	Montgomery	40°07′07″N 75°20′46″W
PA-55	Reading-Halls Station Bridge	Extant	Howe truss	1846	1984	Private road	Philadelphia and Reading Railroad (former)	Muncy	Lycoming	41°14′09″N 76°49′57″W
PA-60	Speicher Bridge	Replaced	Pratt truss	1878	1983	Old Church Road	Tulpehocken Creek	Penn and North Heidelberg townships	Berks	40°24′21″N 76°04′50″W
PA-63	Erie Railway, Meadville Division, Bridge 33.14	Extant	Pratt truss	1891	1999	Erie Railway (former)	Oil Creek	Oil City	Venango	41°25′57″N 79°42′34″W
PA-67	Gross Covered Bridge	Relocated	Burr truss	1878	1981	TR 574	Middle Creek	Beaver Springs	Snyder	40°44′49″N 77°12′42″W
PA-68	Kuhn's Fording Bridge	Demolished	Burr truss	1897	1982	Kuhn Fording Road	Conewago Creek	East Berlin	Adams	39°55′29″N 76°59′40″W
PA-72	Dunlap's Creek Bridge	Extant	Cast iron arch	1839	1984	Market Street	Dunlap's Creek	Brownsville	Fayette	40°01′18″N 79°53′17″W
PA-83	College Avenue Bridge	Replaced	Warren truss	1914	1987	PA 58	Little Shenango River	Greenville	Mercer	41°24′34″N 80°23′04″W
PA-84	Main Street Bridge	Replaced	Fink truss	1847	1986	Main Street	French Creek	Phoenixville	Chester	40°08′09″N 75°30′59″W
PA-86	Callowhill Street Bridge	Replaced	Whipple truss	1875	1988	Callowhill Street	Schuylkill River	Philadelphia	Philadelphia	39°57′52″N 75°11′00″W
PA-87	Tunkhannock Viaduct	Extant	Reinforced concrete open-spandrel arch	1915	1985	Delaware, Lackawanna and Western Railroad (former)	Tunkhannock Creek	Nicholson	Wyoming	41°37′20″N 75°46′38″W
PA-88	Christiana Borough Bridge	Replaced	Whipple truss	1895	1985	North Bridge Street	Pennsylvania Railroad (former)	Christiana	Lancaster	39°57′26″N 75°59′50″W
PA-90	Catawissa Bridge	Replaced	Warren truss	1898	1984	PA 42 (Main Street)	West Branch Susquehanna River	Catawissa	Columbia	40°57′15″N 76°28′05″W
PA-91	Bridge Street Bridge	Replaced	Pratt truss	1897	1985	Bridge Street	South Branch French Creek	Union City	Erie	41°53′50″N 79°50′07″W
PA-92	Strawberry Mansion Bridge	Extant	Steel arch	1897	1999	Strawberry Mansion Drive	Schuylkill River	Philadelphia	Philadelphia	39°59′42″N 75°11′37″W
PA-93	Old Mill Road Bridge	Extant	Pratt truss	1870	1991	Old Mill Road	Saucon Creek	Hellertown	Northampton	40°33′41″N 75°20′53″W
PA-96	West End-North Side Bridge	Extant	Steel tied arch	1932	1985	US 19	Ohio River	Pittsburgh	Allegheny	40°26′47″N 80°01′37″W
PA-97	Smithton Bridge	Replaced	Cantilever	1900	1986	PA 981	Youghiogheny River	Smithton	Westmoreland	40°09′25″N 79°44′41″W
PA-98	Washingtonville Bridge	Demolished	Pratt truss	1887	1986	DeLong Road	Chillisquaque Creek	Derry Township	Montour	41°04′08″N 76°40′55″W
PA-99	St. Anthony Street Bridge	Replaced	Pratt truss	1889	1987	St. Anthony Street	Buffalo Creek	Lewisburg	Union	40°58′12″N 76°53′00″W
PA-100	East Bloomsburg Bridge	Replaced	Pennsylvania truss	1894	1987	PA 487 (Ferry Road)	Susquehanna River	Bloomsburg and Catawissa Township	Columbia	40°59′33″N 76°26′21″W
PA-101	Emlenton Bridge	Replaced	Whipple truss	1883	1987	PA 38	Allegheny River	Emlenton	Venango and Clarion	41°10′33″N 79°42′29″W
PA-102	Memorial Avenue Bridge	Replaced	Pennsylvania truss	1889	1986	Memorial Avenue	Lycoming Creek	Williamsport	Lycoming	41°14′41″N 77°02′53″W
PA-105	South Street Bridge	Replaced	Pratt truss	1925	1986	South Street	Pocono Northeast Railroad (former)	Wilkes-Barre	Luzerne	41°14′23″N 75°53′6″W
PA-112	Allentown Road Bridge	Replaced	Stone arch	1837	1987	Allentown Road	Skippack Creek	Franconia Township	Montgomery	40°17′19″N 75°20′19″W
PA-116	Philadelphia and Reading Railroad, Skew Arch Bridge	Extant	Stone arch	1857	2000	Norfolk Southern Railway	North 6th Street	Reading	Berks	40°20′34″N 75°55′33″W
PA-117	Philadelphia and Reading Railroad, Reading Depot Bridge	Demolished	Howe truss		1975	Norfolk Southern Railway	North 6th Street	Reading	Berks	40°20′35″N 75°55′32″W
PA-118	Philadelphia and Reading Railroad, Peacock's Lock Viaduct	Extant	Stone arch	1856	2000	Reading Blue Mountain and Northern Railroad	Schuylkill River	Reading	Berks	40°24′36″N 75°56′51″W
PA-119	Philadelphia and Reading Railroad, Walnut Street Bridge	Replaced	King post truss		1975	Walnut Street	Norfolk Southern Railway	Reading	Berks	40°20′18″N 75°55′26″W
PA-120	Philadelphia and Reading Railroad, Pedestrian Suspension Bridge	Relocated (partial)	Suspension	1887	2000	Sixth Street	Philadelphia and Reading Railroad (former)	Reading	Berks	40°19′28″N 75°55′34″W
PA-123	Tank Farm Road Bridge	Demolished	Bowstring arch truss		1988	Tank Farm Road	Philadelphia and Reading Railroad (former)	Emmaus	Lehigh	40°31′22″N 75°31′48″W
PA-125	Walnut Lane Bridge	Replaced	Prestressed concrete I-beam	1950	1988	Walnut Lane	Lincoln Drive and Monoshone Creek	Philadelphia	Philadelphia	40°01′59″N 75°11′16″W
PA-129	Dauberville Bridge	Replaced	Reinforced concrete closed-spandrel arch	1908	1988	Belleman's Church Road	Schuylkill River	Centre and Ontelaunee townships	Berks	40°27′25″N 75°58′37″W
PA-130	Allenwood Bridge	Replaced	Pratt truss	1895	1989	PA 44 (Bridge Avenue)	West Branch Susquehanna River	Delaware and Gregg townships	Northumberland and Union	41°06′28″N 76°53′25″W
PA-131	Hill to Hill Bridge	Extant	Hudson truss	1924	1988	PA 378 (Wyandotte Street)	Lehigh River	Bethlehem	Lehigh and Northampton	40°36′56″N 75°23′05″W
PA-132-A	Delaware, Lackawanna and Western Railroad, Scranton Yards, Bridge 60	Extant	Steel built-up girder	1908	1989	Delaware, Lackawanna and Western Railroad (former)	Lackawanna River, etc.	Scranton	Lackawanna	41°24′40″N 75°40′23″W
PA-132-H	Delaware, Lackawanna and Western Railroad, Scranton Yards, Washington Avenue Bridge	Replaced (partial)	Steel built-up girder	1908	1989	Delaware, Lackawanna and Western Railroad (former)	Lackawanna River, etc.	Scranton	Lackawanna	41°24′22″N 75°39′57″W
PA-132-J	Delaware, Lackawanna and Western Railroad, Scranton Yards, Cedar Avenue Bridge	Replaced	Steel built-up girder	1908	1989	Delaware, Lackawanna and Western Railroad (former)	Lackawanna River, etc.	Scranton	Lackawanna	41°24′20″N 75°39′50″W
PA-135	Brown Street Bridge	Replaced	Baltimore truss	1899	1989	Brown Street	Oil Creek	Titusville	Crawford	41°37′26″N 79°39′55″W
PA-141	Freemansburg–Steel City Bridge	Replaced	Parker truss	1896	1979	Main Street	Lehigh River	Freemansburg	Northampton	40°37′20″N 75°20′03″W
PA-144	Lehigh Canal, Monocacy Creek Aqueduct	Ruin	Stone arch	1829	1979	Lehigh Canal	Monocacy Creek	Bethlehem	Northampton	40°36′59″N 75°22′50″W
PA-173	Sanderson Avenue Bridge	Replaced	Reinforced concrete closed-spandrel arch	1904	1989	Sanderson Avenue	Lackawanna River	Scranton	Lackawanna	41°26′05″N 75°38′48″W
PA-178	Lehigh Canal, Aquashicola Creek Aqueduct	Ruin			1979	Lehigh Canal	Aquashicola Creek	Lower Towamensing Township	Carbon	40°47′33″N 75°36′45″W
PA-179	Bodines Bridge	Replaced	Pratt truss	1890	1989	SR 1006	Lycoming Creek	Lewis Township	Lycoming	41°05′38″N 76°48′11″W
PA-191	Wilson Shute Bridge	Replaced	Pratt truss	1889	1990	SR 2008 (Wilson Chutes Road)	French Creek	Meadville	Crawford	41°35′21″N 80°09′01″W
PA-193	Bucks County Bridge No. 313	Replaced	Pratt truss	1875	1993	Letchworth Avenue	Delaware Division Canal	Yardley	Bucks	40°14′19″N 74°49′52″W
PA-195	Lindbergh Bridge	Extant	Reinforced concrete open-spandrel arch	1928	1991	Marple Avenue	Darby Creek	Clifton Heights	Delaware	39°56′01″N 75°17′24″W
PA-196	Dougal Truss Bridge	Extant	Pratt truss		1990	LR 920 (Gobbler's Way)	Pennsylvania Canal (Delaware Division)	Point Pleasant	Bucks	40°25′25″N 75°03′55″W
PA-197	Cabin Run Covered Bridge	Extant	Town lattice truss	1871	1990	Schlentz Hill Road	Cabin Run	Point Pleasant	Bucks	40°25′55″N 75°06′45″W
PA-198	Loux Covered Bridge	Extant	Town lattice truss	1874	1990	Carversville-Wisner Road	Cabin Run	Bedminster and Plumstead townships	Bucks	40°25′23″N 75°07′40″W
PA-205	Stewartstown Railroad Bridge	Extant	Pratt truss	1870	1991	Valley Road	Stewartstown Railroad	Stewartstown	York	39°45′19″N 76°36′34″W
PA-206	Walnut Street Bridge	Relocated	Pratt truss	1860	1991	Walnut Street	Saucon Creek	Hellertown	Northampton	40°34′21″N 75°20′37″W
PA-207	Haupt Truss Bridge	Relocated	Haupt truss	1854	1986		Railroaders Memorial Museum	Altoona	Blair	40°30′50″N 78°23′57″W
PA-208	Hares Hill Road Bridge	Extant	Bowstring arch truss	1869	1991	SR 1045 (Hares Hill Road)	French Creek	Kimberton	Chester	40°08′28″N 75°34′04″W
PA-209	Henszey's Wrought-Iron Arch Bridge	Relocated	Bowstring arch truss	1869	1991	SR 4036 (Kings Road)	Ontelaunee Creek	Lynn Township	Lehigh	40°18′17″N 76°56′02″W
PA-210	Scarlets Mill Bridge	Extant	Pratt truss	1881	1991	Horseshoe Trail	Philadelphia and Reading Railroad (former)	Scarlets Mill	Berks	40°13′12″N 75°50′37″W
PA-211	Rush's Mill Bridge	Extant	Howe truss	1869	1991	Union Canal trail	Plum Creek	Sinking Spring	Berks	40°15′44″N 80°16′02″W
PA-215	Brevard Bridge	Replaced	Steel rolled stringer	1913	1991	Ullom Road	Westland Run	Export	Washington	40°15′44″N 80°16′02″W
PA-217	Coraopolis Bridge	Replaced	Pennsylvania truss	1892	1990	Grand Avenue	Ohio River back channel	Coraopolis	Allegheny	40°30′58″N 80°09′07″W
PA-223	York County Bridge No. 29	Replaced	Stone arch	1913	1991	Norris Road	Orson Run	Airville	York	39°47′19″N 76°23′54″W
PA-225	Mercer County Bridge No. 2631	Replaced	Pratt truss	1894	1991	Cribbs Road	Pine Run	Mercer	Mercer	41°11′30″N 80°11′15″W
PA-233	Fifficktown Bridge	Replaced	Warren truss	1910	1987	Oak Street	Little Conemaugh River	South Fork	Cambria	40°22′11″N 78°47′09″W
PA-236	Birmingham Bridge	Extant	Pratt truss	1898	1987	Irish Flat Road	Little Juniata River	Tyrone	Blair	40°38′57″N 78°11′56″W
PA-239	Skew Arch Bridge, Spanning Incline No. 6 of Allegheny Portage Railroad	Extant	Stone arch	1833	1987	US 22 (former)	Incline No. 6 of Allegheny Portage Railroad	Cresson	Cambria	40°27′11″N 78°32′34″W
PA-246	Stone Creek Bridge I	Extant	Stone arch	1850	1987	Pennsylvania Railroad (former)	Standing Stone Creek	Huntingdon	Huntingdon	40°28′53″N 78°00′15″W
PA-247	Stone Creek Bridge II	Extant	Stone arch	1891	1987	Pennsylvania Railroad (former)	Standing Stone Creek	Huntingdon	Huntingdon	40°28′51″N 78°00′16″W
PA-248	Corbin Bridge	Extant	Suspension	1937	1987	Corbin Road	Raystown Branch Juniata River	Juniata Township	Huntingdon	40°27′17″N 77°58′59″W
PA-262	Ernest Mines Railroad Bridge	Demolished	Baltimore truss		1987	Buffalo, Rochester and Pittsburgh Railway (former)	McKee Run	Ernest	Indiana	40°40′27″N 79°10′38″W
PA-266	Mahoning Creek Trestle	Extant	Trestle	1899	1987	Buffalo, Rochester and Pittsburgh Railway (former)	Mahoning Creek	West Mahoning Township	Indiana	40°53′16″N 79°12′28″W
PA-267	Pennsylvania Railroad, East Tunnel Viaduct	Extant	Stone arch	1907	1987	Pennsylvania Railroad (former)	Conemaugh River	Conemaugh Township	Indiana	40°27′41″N 79°21′44″W
PA-268	Pennsylvania Railroad, West Tunnel Viaduct	Extant	Stone arch	1907	1987	Pennsylvania Railroad (former)	Conemaugh River	Conemaugh Township	Indiana	40°27′42″N 79°22′03″W
PA-275	York County Bridge No. 101	Replaced	Stone arch	1915	1993	TR 578 (Blymire Hollow Road)	Blymire Creek	Winterstown	York	39°49′00″N 76°37′49″W
PA-276	York County Bridge No. 149	Replaced	Reinforced concrete closed-spandrel arch	1913	1993	TR 370 (Pentland Road)	East Branch Codorus Creek	Jefferson	York	39°48′03″N 76°51′45″W
PA-277-A	Monongahela Connecting Railroad, Y Trestle	Demolished	Trestle	1899	1993	Monongahela Connecting Railroad (former)	Pittsburgh and Lake Erie Railroad	Pittsburgh	Allegheny	40°25′35″N 79°57′43″W
PA-277-B	Monongahela Connecting Railroad, Main Bridge	Extant	Parker truss	1904	1993	South 29th Street	Monongahela River	Pittsburgh	Allegheny	40°25′42″N 79°57′38″W
PA-277-C	Monongahela Connecting Railroad, Hot Metal Bridge	Extant	Parker truss	1900	1993	Great Allegheny Passage	Monongahela River	Pittsburgh	Allegheny	40°25′42″N 79°57′39″W
PA-284	Penns Creek Bridge	Replaced	Reinforced concrete closed-spandrel arch	1874		SR 1014 (Mill Road)	Penns Creek	Monroe and Penn townships	Snyder	40°49′31″N 76°52′22″W
PA-300	Conrail Port Perry Bridge	Extant	Parker truss	1904	1994	Pennsylvania Railroad, Port Perry Branch (former)	Monongahela River	North Versailles Township and Duquesne	Allegheny	40°23′14″N 79°51′05″W
PA-307	Core Creek County Bridge	Replaced	Stone arch	1875	1993	Silver Lake Road	Core Creek	Newtown	Bucks	40°13′07″N 74°54′09″W
PA-308	Montgomery County Bridge No. 221	Replaced	Pratt truss	1896	1993	Metz Road	Towamencin Creek	Towamencin Township	Montgomery	40°13′44″N 75°21′48″W
PA-309	Gulph Creek Stone Arch Bridge	Extant	Stone arch	1789	1994	Old Gulph Road	Gulph Creek	King of Prussia	Montgomery	40°03′42″N 75°20′29″W
PA-310	Perkiomen Stone Arch Bridge	Extant	Stone arch	1799	1994	Ridge Pike	Perkiomen Creek	Collegeville	Montgomery	40°11′03″N 75°26′54″W
PA-311	Skippack Stone Arch Bridge	Extant	Stone arch	1792	1994	Germantown Pike	Skippack Creek	Lower Providence Township	Montgomery	40°10′49″N 75°25′18″W
PA-341	Dubbs Bridge	Replaced	Stone arch	1830	1994	SR 2031 (Spinnerstown Road)	Hosensack Creek	Lower Milford Township	Lehigh	40°28′15″N 75°28′00″W
PA-342	Market Street Bridge	Extant	Reinforced concrete open-spandrel arch	1929	2001	Market Street	Susquehanna River north branch	Wilkes-Barre	Luzerne	41°14′58″N 75°53′07″W
PA-344	Pennsylvania Railroad, Loyalhanna Creek Bridge	Extant	Stone arch	1901	1991	Pennsylvania Railroad (former)	Loyalhanna Creek	Latrobe	Westmoreland	40°18′54″N 79°23′22″W
PA-350	Felten's Mill Covered Bridge	Extant	Burr truss	1892	1991	TR 412 (former)	Loyalhanna Creek	East Providence Township	Bedford	39°58′23″N 78°17′19″W
PA-352	Jackson's Mill Covered Bridge	Extant	Burr truss	1886	1991	TR 412	Brush Creek	East Providence Township	Bedford	39°58′16″N 78°16′18″W
PA-356	Bedford County Bridge No. 4	Extant	Pratt truss	1889	1991	TR 655	Yellow Creek	Hopewell	Bedford	40°08′17″N 78°16′17″W
PA-357	Bedford County Bridge No. 32	Replaced	Pratt truss	1882	1991	TR 350 (Schellsburg Street)	Wills Creek	Hyndman	Bedford	39°49′29″N 78°43′23″W
PA-358	North Hyndman Bridge	Extant	Pratt truss	1916	1991	Baltimore and Ohio Railroad (former)	Wills Creek	Hyndman	Bedford	39°49′27″N 78°43′15″W
PA-361	Raystown Covered Bridge	Extant	Burr truss	1892	1991	TR 418	Raystown Branch Juniata River	Manns Choice	Bedford	40°00′34″N 78°38′55″W
PA-371	Salisbury Junction Viaduct	Extant	Viaduct	1911	1992	Western Maryland Railway (former)	Casselman River and US 219	Meyersdale	Somerset	39°50′03″N 79°02′44″W
PA-373	Wills Creek Bollman Bridge	Relocated	Warren truss	1871	1991	Great Allegheny Passage	Scratch Hill Road	Meyersdale	Somerset	39°49′06″N 78°59′41″W
PA-383	Bell Avenue Bridge	Replaced	Stone arch	1880	1995	Pittsburgh, Cincinnati, Chicago and St. Louis Railroad (former)	Bell Avenue	Carnegie	Allegheny	40°24′55″N 80°05′00″W
PA-388	Oakland Avenue Viaduct	Replaced	Reinforced concrete open-spandrel arch	1936	1995	South Oakland Avenue	US 62 and Pine Run	Sharon	Mercer	41°13′52″N 80°29′58″W
PA-402	Runk Bridge	Extant	Pratt truss	1898	1986	Aughwick Creek Road	Aughwick Creek	Shirleysburg	Huntingdon	40°16′40″N 77°53′14″W
PA-403	Augwick Creek Bridge	Abandoned	Reinforced concrete closed-spandrel arch		1986	East Broad Top Railroad (former)	Aughwick Creek	Shirley Township	Huntingdon	40°20′06″N 77°51′37″W
PA-406	Horner Street Bridge	Replaced	Reinforced concrete through arch	1917	1992	Horner Street	Stonycreek River	Johnstown	Cambria	40°18′19″N 78°54′41″W
PA-407	Ackerly Creek Bridge	Replaced	Reinforced concrete closed-spandrel arch	1904	1995	SR 4011 (South Turnpike Road)	Ackerly Creek	Dalton	Lackawanna	41°31′44″N 75°44′07″W
PA-408	Centennial Bridge	Demolished	Stone arch	1876	1996	SR 2030 (Station Avenue)	Laurel Run (Saucon Creek)	Center Valley	Lehigh	40°31′43″N 75°23′30″W
PA-412	Walnut Street Bridge	Extant (partial)	Baltimore truss	1890	1996	SR 3034 (Walnut Street)	Susquehanna River	Harrisburg	Dauphin	40°15′27″N 76°53′10″W
PA-415	Chester County Bridge No. 225	Replaced	Steel rolled stringer	1907	1996	Hopewell Road	Tweed Creek	Oxford	Chester	39°46′45″N 76°01′04″W
PA-418	Plunketts Creek Bridge No. 3	Replaced	Stone arch	1875	1996	SR 1005	Plunketts Creek	Plunketts Creek Township	Lycoming	41°24′32″N 76°48′10″W
PA-419	York County Bridge No. 150	Replaced	Reinforced concrete closed-spandrel arch	1915	1995	TR 370 (Pentland Road)	Codorus Creek	Jefferson	York	39°48′03″N 76°51′45″W
PA-421	County Bridge No. 14	Replaced	Baltimore truss	1896	1997	TR 493 (Spencer Road)	Tioga River	Mansfield	Tioga	41°46′55″N 77°04′17″W
PA-422	Church Road Bridge	Replaced	Haupt truss	1851	1999	Church Road	SEPTA Paoli/Thorndale Line	Ardmore	Montgomery	40°00′21″N 75°17′6″W
PA-425	Lynn Avenue Bridge	Replaced	Pennsylvania truss	1928	1997	Lynn Avenue	Philadelphia, Bethlehem and New England Railroad (former)	Bethlehem	Northampton	40°36′39″N 75°20′58″W
PA-428	Knight Bridge	Replaced	Pratt truss	1893	1996	TR 413	Catawissa Creek	Mainville	Columbia	40°57′48″N 76°22′21″W
PA-431	Mount Pocono Bridge	Replaced	Warren truss	1922	1996	Fairview Avenue	Delaware, Lackawanna and Western Railroad (former)	Mount Pocono	Monroe	41°06′52″N 75°22′03″W
PA-435	Bridge over Little Pine Creek	Replaced	Reinforced concrete open-spandrel arch	1915	1997	SR 1026	Little Pine Creek	Jonestown	Columbia	41°09′08″N 76°17′42″W
PA-443	West Penn Bridge, Pennsylvania Railroad	Extant	Whipple truss	1890	1997	Three Rivers Heritage Trail	Allegheny River back channel	Pittsburgh	Allegheny	40°27′37″N 79°58′54″W
PA-444	Castle Garden Bridge	Replaced	Pratt truss	1901	1994	TR 343	Sinnemahoning Creek	Driftwood	Cameron	41°20′01″N 78°08′09″W
PA-445	McKee's Rocks Bridge	Extant	Steel arch	1931	1997	SR 3014 (Chartiers Avenue)	Ohio River	McKees Rocks and Pittsburgh	Allegheny	40°28′37″N 80°02′56″W
PA-446	George Westinghouse Bridge	Extant	Reinforced concrete open-spandrel arch	1932	1997	US 30 (Lincoln Highway)	Turtle Creek	East Pittsburgh and North Versailles Township	Allegheny	40°23′38″N 79°50′16″W
PA-447	Washington Crossing Bridge	Extant	Steel arch	1924	1997	SR 2124 (40th Street)	Allegheny River	Pittsburgh and Millvale	Allegheny	40°28′22″N 79°58′07″W
PA-448	Liberty Bridge	Extant	Cantilever	1928	1997	SR 3069	Monongahela River	Pittsburgh	Allegheny	40°25′58″N 79°59′48″W
PA-449	Narrows Bridge	Extant	Reinforced concrete open-spandrel arch	1935	1997	US 30 (Lincoln Highway)	Raystown Branch Juniata River	Snake Spring Township	Bedford	40°00′52″N 78°28′19″W
PA-450	S Bridge	Replaced	Stone arch	1919	1997	SR 3061	Tulpehocken Creek	Womelsdorf	Berks	40°22′24″N 76°13′6″W
PA-451	Campbell's Bridge (Note: See also HAER No. PA-478, "Structural Study of Pennsylvania Historic Bridges" for additional documentation)	Replaced	Reinforced concrete closed-spandrel arch	1907	1997	SR 4027 (Allentown Road)	Unami Creek	Milford Square	Bucks	40°25′42″N 75°23′48″W
PA-452	Allegheny Portage Railroad, Lilly Culvert	Extant	Stone arch	1832	1997	PA 53	Burgoon Run	Lilly	Cambria	40°25′26″N 78°37′8″W
PA-453	Allegheny Portage Railroad, Bens Creek Culvert	Extant	Stone arch	1832	1997	PA 53	Bens Creek	Portage Township	Cambria	40°24′8″N 78°38′24″W
PA-454	Inclined Plane Bridge	Extant	Pennsylvania truss	1890	1997	SR 3022 spur	Stonycreek River	Johnstown	Cambria	40°19′33″N 78°55′33″W
PA-455	Market Street Bridge	Extant	Reinforced concrete closed-spandrel arch	1928	1997	SR 3012 (Market Street)	East channel of Susquehanna River	Harrisburg	Dauphin	40°15′24″N 76°53′5″W
PA-456	Soldiers' and Sailors' Memorial Bridge	Extant	Reinforced concrete closed-spandrel arch	1930	1997	SR 3014 (State Street)	Paxton Creek and PA 230 (Cameron Street)	Harrisburg	Dauphin	40°16′0″N 76°52′42″W
PA-457	Maclay's Mill Twin Bridge (East and West)	Extant	Stone arch	1827	1997	SR 4018 (Maclay's Mill Road)	Conodoguinet Creek and mill race	Lurgan and Southampton townships	Franklin	40°5′49″N 77°34′13″W
PA-458	McConnell's Mill Bridge	Extant	Howe truss	1875	1997	TR 415 (McConnell's Mill Road)	Slippery Rock Creek	Slippery Rock Township	Lawrence	40°57′10″N 80°10′13″W
PA-459	South Eighth Street Viaduct	Extant	Reinforced concrete open-spandrel arch	1913	1997	SR 2055 (Eighth Street)	Little Lehigh Creek	Allentown	Lehigh	40°35′47″N 75°28′16″W
PA-460	Upper Bridge at Slate Run	Extant	Lattice truss	1890	1997	PA 414	Pine Creek	Brown Township	Lycoming	41°29′11″N 77°29′50″W
PA-461	Lower Bridge at English Center	Extant	Suspension	1891	1999	SR 4001	Pine Creek	English Center	Lycoming	41°26′05″N 77°17′21″W
PA-462	Waterville Bridge	Relocated	Lenticular truss	1891	1997	Appalachian Trail	Swatara Creek	Green Point	Lebanon	40°28′49″N 76°31′55″W
PA-463	Brick Arch Culvert over Master Street	Extant	Brick arch	1902	1997	US 13 (Thirty-third Street)	Master Street	Philadelphia	Philadelphia	39°58′42″N 75°11′22″W
PA-464	Henry Avenue Bridge	Extant	Reinforced concrete open-spandrel arch	1931	1997	SR 4001 (Henry Avenue)	Wissahickon Creek and Lincoln Drive	Philadelphia	Philadelphia	40°01′27″N 75°11′46″W
PA-465	Pennypack Creek Bridge	Extant	Stone arch	1697	1997	US 13 (Frankford Avenue)	Pennypack Creek	Philadelphia	Philadelphia	40°03′53″N 74°58′53″W
PA-466	Pithole Stone Arch Bridge	Extant	Stone arch	1898	1997	SR 1004 (Eagle Rock Road)	Pithole Creek	Pithole	Venango	41°29′13″N 79°35′43″W
PA-467	Charleroi–Monessen Bridge	Demolished	Pennsylvania truss	1907	1997	SR 2018	Monongahela River	North Charleroi and Monessen	Washington and Westmoreland	40°09′06″N 79°54′15″W
PA-468	Nicholson Township Lenticular Bridge	Extant	Lenticular truss	1881	1997	SR 1029	Tunkhannock Creek	Nicholson Township	Wyoming	41°36′17″N 75°49′22″W
PA-469	Kralltown Road Bridge	Replaced	Pratt truss	1884	1997	SR 4017 (Kralltown Road)	Bermudian Creek	Kralltown	York	40°00′31″N 76°57′46″W
PA-470	Kellams Bridge	Extant	Suspension	1890	1997	SR 1018 (Kellam Bridge Road)	Delaware River	Stalker, Pennsylvania, and Hankins, New York	Wayne County, Pennsylvania, and Sullivan County, New York	41°49′24″N 75°06′49″W
PA-471	Frankford Avenue Bridge over Poquessing Creek	Extant	Reinforced concrete closed-spandrel arch	1904	1997	US 13 (Frankford Avenue)	Poquessing Creek	Philadelphia	Philadelphia	40°03′54″N 74°58′52″W
PA-472	Old Brownsville Bridge	Extant	Pennsylvania truss	1914	1997	SR 2067	Monongahela River	Brownsville and West Brownsville	Fayette and Washington	40°01′21″N 80°09′45″W
PA-473	Columbia–Wrightsville Bridge	Extant	Reinforced concrete open-spandrel arch	1930	1997	PA 462 (Lincoln Highway)	Susquehanna River	Columbia and Wrightsville	Lancaster and York	40°01′44″N 76°31′01″W
PA-474	Coverts Crossing Bridge	Replaced	Cantilever	1887	1997	TR 372 (Covert Road)	Mahoning River	New Castle	Lawrence	40°59′49″N 80°24′51″W
PA-477	Fayette County Bridge No. 103	Replaced	Pratt truss	1903	1998	TR 364	Jacobs Creek	Masontown	Fayette	
PA-478	Structural Study of Pennsylvania Historic Bridges				1997	Structural analyses of Campbell's Bridge, Upper Bridge at Slate Run, and Frankford Avenue Bridge over Poquessing Creek		Harrisburg	Dauphin	
PA-479	Breslau Bridge	Demolished	Parker truss	1914	1998	Hanover Street	North Branch Susquehanna River	Plymouth	Luzerne	41°14′15″N 75°56′37″W
PA-480	Parryville Bridge	Replaced	Steel rolled stringer	1933	1998	SR 2008 (Centre Street)	Pohopoco Creek	Parryville	Carbon	40°49′03″N 75°40′22″W
PA-481	South Street Bridge	Replaced	Simple trunnion bascule	1923	2006	South Street	Schuylkill River	Philadelphia	Philadelphia	39°56′47″N 75°11′10″W
PA-486	Little Conewago Creek Bridge	Extant	Reinforced concrete closed-spandrel arch	1919	1999	US 30 (Lincoln Highway)	South Branch of Conewago Creek	New Oxford	Adams	39°51′42″N 77°04′26″W
PA-487	Davis Avenue Bridge	Demolished	Cantilever	1899	1999	Davis Avenue	Woods Run Avenue	Pittsburgh	Allegheny	40°28′54″N 80°01′32″W
PA-488	Larimer Avenue Bridge	Extant	Reinforced concrete open-spandrel arch	1912	1999	Larimer Avenue	PA 8 (Washington Boulevard)	Pittsburgh	Allegheny	40°28′02″N 79°54′33″W
PA-489	Schenley Park Bridge over Panther Hollow	Extant	Steel hinged arch	1896	1999	Panther Hollow Road	Panther Hollow	Pittsburgh	Allegheny	40°26′13″N 79°56′48″W
PA-490-A	Three Sisters Bridges, Sixth Street Bridge	Extant	Suspension	1928	1999	Sixth Street	Allegheny River	Pittsburgh	Allegheny	40°26′44″N 80°00′12″W
PA-490-B	Three Sisters Bridges, Seventh Street Bridge	Extant	Suspension	1926	1999	Seventh Street	Allegheny River	Pittsburgh	Allegheny	40°26′46″N 80°00′05″W
PA-490-C	Three Sisters Bridges, Ninth Street Bridge	Extant	Suspension	1926	1999	Ninth Street	Allegheny River	Pittsburgh	Allegheny	40°26′48″N 79°59′59″W
PA-491	Pleasantville Covered Bridge	Extant	Burr truss	1852	1999	SR 1030 (Covered Bridge Road)	Manatawny Creek	Oley Township	Berks	40°22′44″N 75°44′21″W
PA-492	Gay Street Bridge	Replaced	Reinforced concrete open-spandrel arch	1926	1999	PA 113 (Gay Street)	French Creek	Phoenixville	Chester	40°08′07″N 75°31′07″W
PA-493-B	Phoenix Iron Company, French Creek Bridge	Extant	Pratt truss		1999	Schuylkill River Trail	French Creek	Phoenixville	Chester	40°08′08″N 75°31′03″W
PA-494	Franklin Street Bridge	Extant	Stone arch	1939	1999	PA 8 (Franklin Street)	Oil Creek	Titusville	Crawford	41°37′22″N 79°40′24″W
PA-495	Pine Creek Bridge	Relocated	Bowstring arch truss	1876	1999	TR 993 (Messerall Road)	Pine Creek	Titusville	Crawford	41°37′20″N 79°38′10″W
PA-496	Wiconisco Canal Aqueduct No. 3	Extant	Stone arch	1840	1999	PA 147 (River Road)	Powell Creek	Halifax	Dauphin	40°24′35″N 76°59′03″W
PA-497	Mulberry Street Viaduct	Extant	Reinforced concrete girder	1909	1999	SR 3012 (Mulberry Street)	Paxton Creek and PA 230 (Cameron Street)	Harrisburg	Dauphin	40°15′40″N 76°52′30″W
PA-498	Harrison Avenue Bridge	Replaced	Reinforced concrete open-spandrel arch	1922	1999	SR 6011 (Harrison Avenue)	Roaring Brook	Scranton	Lackawanna	41°24′00″N 75°39′05″W
PA-499	Pond Creek Bridge	Extant	Stone arch	1938	1999	SR 2016 (Bear Lake Road)	Pond Creek	Thornhurst	Lackawanna	41°13′01″N 75°37′07″W
PA-500	Big Conestoga Creek Bridge No. 12	Replaced	Reinforced concrete cantilever	1917	1999	SR 1010 (Farmersville Road)	Conestoga River	Brownstown	Lancaster	40°07′40″N 76°11′59″W
PA-501	Mill Creek Bridge	Extant	Stone arch	1885	1999	SR 2004 (River Street)	Mill Creek	Wilkes-Barre	Luzerne	41°15′37″N 75°52′03″W
PA-502	Northampton Street Bridge	Extant	Cantilever	1896	1999	Northampton Street	Delaware River	Easton, Pennsylvania, and Phillipsburg, New Jersey	Northampton County, Pennsylvania, and Warren County, New Jersey	40°41′29″N 75°12′14″W
PA-503	University Avenue Bridge	Extant	Simple trunnion bascule	1933	1999	SR 3003 (University Avenue)	Schuylkill River	Philadelphia	Philadelphia	39°56′30″N 75°11′52″W
PA-504	Walnut Lane Bridge	Extant	Reinforced concrete open-spandrel arch	1908	1999	SR 4013 (Walnut Lane)	Wissahickon Creek	Philadelphia	Philadelphia	40°01′56″N 75°11′59″W
PA-508	Bessemer and Lake Erie Railroad, Allegheny River Bridge	Extant	Baltimore truss	1918	2000	Bessemer and Lake Erie Railroad	Allegheny River	Oakmont	Allegheny	40°32′15″N 79°49′15″W
PA-509	Ohio Connecting Railway, Brunot's Island Bridge	Extant	Pennsylvania truss	1890	2000	Norfolk Southern Railway	Ohio River and Brunot Island	Pittsburgh	Allegheny	40°27′46″N 80°02′34″W
PA-510	Beaver Bridge	Extant	Cantilever	1910	2000	CSX Transportation	Ohio River	Beaver	Beaver	40°41′34″N 80°17′27″W
PA-511	Pittsburgh, Fort Wayne and Chicago Railway, Beaver River Bridge	Extant	Warren truss	1926	2000	Norfolk Southern Railway	Beaver River	New Brighton	Beaver	40°44′23″N 80°19′10″W
PA-512	Morrisville–Trenton Railroad Bridge	Extant	Stone arch	1903	2000	Amtrak Northeast Corridor, etc.	Delaware River	Morrisville, Pennsylvania, and Trenton, New Jersey	Bucks County, Pennsylvania, and Mercer County, New Jersey	40°12′30″N 74°46′02″W
PA-513	West Trenton Railroad Bridge	Extant	Reinforced concrete closed-spandrel arch	1913	2000	SEPTA West Trenton Line	Delaware River	Yardley, Pennsylvania, and Ewing Township, New Jersey	Bucks County, Pennsylvania, and Mercer County, New Jersey	40°14′30″N 74°49′27″W
PA-517	Stone Bridge (Johnstown, Pennsylvania)	Extant	Reinforced concrete closed-spandrel arch	1888	2000	Norfolk Southern Railway	Conemaugh River	Johnstown	Cambria	40°19′57″N 78°55′30″W
PA-518	Brandywine Valley Viaduct	Extant	Pratt truss	1904	2000	Pennsylvania Railroad Philadelphia and Thorndale Branch (former)	Brandywine River and US 322	Downingtown	Chester	39°59′42″N 75°41′57″W
PA-519	French Creek Trestle	Extant	Steel built-up girder	1892	2000	Pennsylvania Railroad Schuylkill Branch (former)	French Creek	Phoenixville	Chester	40°08′04″N 75°31′35″W
PA-521	Pickering Creek Trestle	Extant	Steel built-up girder	1883	2000	Pennsylvania Railroad Schuylkill Branch (former)	Pickering Creek and PA 29	Pickering	Chester	40°06′22″N 75°31′49″W
PA-522	Whitford Bridge	Extant	Parker truss	1905	2000	Pennsylvania Railroad Philadelphia and Thorndale Branch (former)	SEPTA Paoli/Thorndale Line	Whitford (Exton)	Chester	40°00′53″N 75°38′19″W
PA-523	Philadelphia and Reading Railroad, Susquehanna River Bridge	Extant	Reinforced concrete closed-spandrel arch	1924	2000	Norfolk Southern Railway	Susquehanna River	Harrisburg	Dauphin	40°14′57″N 76°52′58″W
PA-524	Rockville Bridge	Extant	Stone arch	1902	2000	Amtrak Keystone Service	Susquehanna River	Rockville	Dauphin	40°20′00″N 76°54′37″W
PA-525	Chester Creek Bridge	Extant	Swing span	1907	2000	Chester and Delaware River Railroad (former)	Chester Creek	Chester	Delaware	39°50′38″N 75°21′34″W
PA-526	Darby River Bridge	Extant	Multiple trunnion (Strauss) bascule	1918	2000	Philadelphia, Baltimore and Washington Railroad (former)	Darby Creek	Eddystone	Delaware	39°51′54″N 75°18′48″W
PA-527	Elk Creek Trestle	Extant	Trestle	1902	2000	New York, Chicago and St. Louis Railroad (former)	Elk Creek	Lake City	Erie	42°00′13″N 80°20′56″W
PA-528	New Geneva Bridge	Extant	Pennsylvania truss	1913	2000	Monongahela Railroad (former)	Monongahela River	Nicholson Township	Fayette and Greene	39°46′52″N 79°56′05″W
PA-529	Mount Union Bridge	Extant	Stone arch	1906	2000	Pennsylvania Railroad (former)	Juniata River	Mount Union	Huntingdon and Mifflin	40°23′02″N 77°52′24″W
PA-530	Conestoga Creek Viaduct	Extant	Stone arch	1888	2000	Amtrak Keystone Service	Conestoga River	Lancaster	Lancaster	40°03′00″N 76°16′41″W
PA-531	Safe Harbor Trestle	Extant	Trestle	1905	2000	Atglen and Susquehanna Railroad (former)	Conestoga River	Safe Harbor	Lancaster	39°55′31″N 76°23′03″W
PA-532	Beaver River Bridge	Extant	Pratt truss	1897	2000	Pittsburgh, Youngstown and Ashtabula Railroad (former)	Beaver River	Wampum	Lawrence	40°53′15″N 80°20′03″W
PA-533	Allegheny River Bridge	Extant	Pratt truss	1900	2000	Western New York and Pennsylvania Railway (former)	Allegheny River	Eldred	McKean	41°54′06″N 78°23′06″W
PA-534	Granville Bridge	Extant	Stone arch	1905	2000	Pennsylvania Railroad (former)	Juniata River	Lewistown	Mifflin	40°34′25″N 77°35′19″W
PA-535	Bridgeport Bridge	Extant	Warren truss	1912	2000	SEPTA Norristown High Speed Line	Schuylkill River	Bridgeport	Montgomery	40°06′38″N 75°20′47″W
PA-536	Mill Creek Bridge	Extant	Stone arch	1863	2000	Philadelphia and Reading Railroad (former)	Mill Creek	Gladwyne	Montgomery	40°02′42″N 75°15′23″W
PA-537	Manatawny Creek Bridge	Extant	Stone arch	1847	2000	Philadelphia and Reading Railroad (former)	Manatawny Creek	Pottstown	Montgomery	40°14′46″N 75°39′25″W
PA-538	Trenton Cutoff, Bridge No. 25 at Earnest	Extant	Warren truss	1891	2000	Norfolk Southern Railway	Schuylkill River	Swedesburg	Montgomery	40°06′10″N 75°19′30″W
PA-540	Lehigh River Bridge	Extant	Pratt truss	1899	2000	Easton and Northern Railroad (former)	Lehigh River	Easton	Northampton	40°41′03″N 75°13′10″W
PA-541	Delaware River Viaduct	Extant	Reinforced concrete open-spandrel arch	1911	2000	Delaware, Lackawanna and Western Railroad Lackawanna Cut-Off (former)	Delaware River	Portland, Pennsylvania, and Columbia, New Jersey	Northampton County, Pennsylvania, and Warren County, New Jersey	40°56′15″N 75°06′21″W
PA-542	Lehigh River Bridge at Easton	Extant	Pratt truss	1899	2000	Central Railroad of New Jersey (former)	Lehigh River	Easton	Northampton	40°41′13″N 75°12′32″W
PA-543	Lehigh Valley Railroad, Delaware River Bridge	Extant	Pratt truss	1866	2000	Lehigh Valley Railroad (former)	Delaware River	Easton, Pennsylvania, and Phillipsburg, New Jersey	Northampton County, Pennsylvania, and Warren County, New Jersey	40°41′20″N 75°12′11″W
PA-544	Martins Creek Bridge	Extant	Lattice truss	1896	2000	Bangor and Portland Railway (former)	Martins Creek	Martins Creek	Northampton	40°46′40″N 75°10′33″W
PA-545	Delair Bridge	Extant	Vertical-lift bridge	1889	2000	New Jersey Transit Atlantic City Line, etc.	Delaware River	Philadelphia, Pennsylvania, and Pennsauken Township, New Jersey	Philadelphia County, Pennsylvania, and Camden County, New Jersey	39°58′57″N 75°04′09″W
PA-546	52nd Street Bridge	Extant	Parker truss	1902	2000	SEPTA Cynwyd Line	SEPTA Paoli/Thorndale Line	Philadelphia	Philadelphia	39°58′44″N 75°13′41″W
PA-547	Gray's Ferry Bridge	Replaced	Swing span	1902	2000	Philadelphia, Wilmington and Baltimore Railroad (former)	Schuylkill River	Philadelphia	Philadelphia	39°56′28″N 75°12′18″W
PA-548	Island Road Bridge	Extant	Reinforced concrete closed-spandrel arch	1913	2000	Philadelphia, Baltimore and Washington Railroad (former)	Island Road	Philadelphia	Philadelphia	39°54′56″N 75°14′42″W
PA-549	25th Street Elevated	Extant	Steel built-up girder	1928	2000	CSX Harrisburg Subdivision	South 25th Street	Philadelphia	Philadelphia	39°55′54″N 75°11′13″W
PA-550	Connecting Railway, Reading Railroad Overpass	Extant	Brick arch	1867	2000	Amtrak Northeast Corridor, etc.	CSX Trenton Subdivision	Philadelphia	Philadelphia	39°58′40″N 75°11′31″W
PA-551	Manayunk Bridge	Extant	Reinforced concrete open-spandrel arch	1918	2000	Cynwyd Line (former)	Schuylkill River and Schuylkill Expressway	Philadelphia	Philadelphia	40°01′31″N 75°13′35″W
PA-552	Philadelphia and Reading Railroad, Mule Bridge	Extant	Lattice truss	1889	2000	Philadelphia and Reading Railroad, Venice Branch	Schuylkill River	Philadelphia	Philadelphia	40°01′19″N 75°13′10″W
PA-553	Philadelphia and Reading Railroad, Bridge at West Falls	Extant	Stone arch	1890	2000	CSX Trenton Subdivision	Schuylkill River	Philadelphia	Philadelphia	40°00′23″N 75°11′33″W
PA-554	Selinsgrove Bridge	Extant	Pratt truss	1892	2000	Norfolk Southern Railway	Susquehanna River	Selinsgrove	Snyder	40°48′05″N 76°50′44″W
PA-555	Pennsylvania Railroad, Brilliant Cut-Off, South Wye	Extant	Stone arch	1903	2000	Pennsylvania Railroad (former)	Lincoln Avenue	Pittsburgh	Allegheny	40°27′44″N 79°54′18″W
PA-556	West Brownsville Junction Bridge	Extant	Pennsylvania truss	1912	2000	Pennsylvania Railroad (former)	Monongahela River	West Brownsville	Washington	40°02′02″N 79°52′35″W
PA-579	Elk Park Road Bridge	Replaced	Parker truss	1927	2001	Elk Park Road	Elk Creek	Lake City	Erie	42°00′23″N 80°21′12″W
PA-580	Fallston Bridge	Extant	Pratt truss	1884	2001	Front Street	Beaver River	Fallston	Beaver	40°43′39″N 80°18′36″W
PA-584	Mortonville Bridge	Extant	Stone arch	1826	2002	SR 3062 (Strasburg Road)	West Branch Brandywine Creek	Mortonville	Chester	39°56′47″N 75°46′44″W
PA-585	State Route 3062 Bridge	Extant	Stone arch	1826	2002	SR 3062 (Strasburg Road)	Mill race	Mortonville	Chester	39°56′47″N 75°46′40″W
PA-586	Pine Grove Bridge	Extant	Burr truss	1884	2002	Ashville Road and Forge Road	East Branch Octoraro Creek	Pine Grove and Oxford	Lancaster and Chester	39°47′37″N 76°02′41″W
PA-587	Dreibelbis Station Bridge	Extant	Burr truss	1869	2002	TR 745 (Balthaser Road)	Maiden Creek	Lenhartsville	Berks	40°33′17″N 75°52′48″W
PA-588	Uhlerstown Covered Bridge	Extant	Lattice truss	1856	2002	Uhlerstown Hill Road	Delaware Canal	Tinicum Township	Bucks	40°31′32″N 75°04′23″W
PA-589	Weaverland Bridge	Extant	Reinforced concrete truss	1916	2002	TR 894 (Quarry Road)	Conestoga River	Weaverland	Lancaster	40°08′16″N 76°03′34″W
PA-590	Mowersville Road Bridge	Demolished	Pratt truss	1897	2002	TR 644 (Mowersville Road)	Paxton Run	Mowersville	Franklin	40°06′56″N 77°35′04″W
PA-591	Yeakle Mill Bridge	Extant	Pratt truss	1888	2002	SR 3026 (Mill Road)	Little Cove Creek	Warren Township	Franklin	39°44′03″N 78°02′11″W
PA-612	South High Street Bridge	Extant	Lenticular truss	1889	2003	South High Street	Little Juniata River	Duncannon	Perry	40°23′23″N 77°01′55″W
PA-613	Ross Fording Bridge	Extant	Pratt truss	1885	2003	SR 3052 (Ross Fording Road)	Octoraro Creek	Sadsburyville	Chester	39°52′58″N 75°59′30″W
PA-614	Pine Creek Bridge	Extant	Lenticular truss	1889	2003	SR 3003 (River Road)	Pine Creek	Jersey Shore	Lycoming	41°10′51″N 77°16′44″W
PA-615	Slates' Mill Bridge	Replaced	Pratt truss	1885	2003	TR 439	South Branch Tunkhannock Creek	Benton Township	Lackawanna	41°33′29″N 75°43′08″W
PA-616	Peevy Road Bridge	Extant	Pratt truss	1880	2003	Peevy Road	Perkiomen Creek	East Greenville	Montgomery	40°24′52″N 75°31′26″W
PA-617	Canal Road Bridge	Extant	Reinforced concrete closed-spandrel arch	1900	2003	Canal Road	Delaware Division Canal	Williams Township	Northampton	40°38′10″N 75°11′34″W
PA-618	Johnston Street Bridge	Extant	Warren truss	1890	2003	Johnston Street	Salt Lick Creek	New Milford	Susquehanna	41°52′51″N 75°43′49″W
PA-619	Morris Run Bridge	Replaced	Reinforced concrete girder	1908	2003	TR 417 (Rickerts Road)	Little Juniata River	Hilltown Township	Bucks	40°22′1″N 75°13′13″W
PA-620	River Road Bridge	Replaced	Pratt truss	1898	2003	River Road	Spring Creek	Spring Creek Township	Elk	41°24′02″N 78°55′58″W
PA-622	Kidd's Mill Bridge (Note: See also HAER No. PA-645, "Structural Study of Smith Trusses" for additional documentation)	Extant	Smith truss	1868	2003	TR 653 (Kidd's Mill Road)	Shenango River	Greenville	Mercer	41°21′13″N 80°23′52″W
PA-623	Mean's Ford Bridge	Extant	Howe truss	1869	2003	Stump Road	Tohickon Creek	Ralph Stover State Park	Bucks	40°26′06″N 75°05′50″W
PA-624	Academia Bridge	Extant	Burr truss	1902	2003	TR 334 (Mill Hill Road) (former)	Tuscarora Creek	Spruce Hill and Beale townships	Juniata	40°29′37″N 77°28′21″W
PA-625	Six Penny Bridge	Extant	Reinforced concrete closed-spandrel arch	1907	2003	School Street	Sixpenny Creek	Union Township	Berks	40°15′27″N 75°46′13″W
PA-626	Williams Road Bridge	Extant	Pratt truss	1912	2003	TR 627 (Williams Road)	Sugar Creek Middle Branch	Plum Township	Venango	41°34′16″N 79°51′38″W
PA-627	Center Street Bridge	Extant	Pratt truss	1896	2003	Center Street	Conneaut Creek	Conneautville	Crawford	41°45′23″N 80°22′15″W
PA-628	Monastery Road Bridge	Replaced	Warren truss	1896	2003	Monastery Road	Pennsylvania Railroad (former)	Lloydsville	Westmoreland	40°18′18″N 79°24′15″W
PA-629	Keggereis Ford Bridge	Extant	Reinforced concrete closed-spandrel arch	1907	2003	SR 4006 (Stone Bridge Road)	West Branch Conococheague Creek	Metal Township	Franklin	40°07′16″N 77°46′39″W
PA-630	Big Chickies Bridge	Extant	Reinforced concrete truss	1916	2003	Auction Road	Chiques Creek	Lancaster Junction	Lancaster	40°7′51″N 76°24′21″W
PA-631	Roaring Creek Bridge	Extant	Reinforced concrete closed-spandrel arch	1913	2003	SR 2005	Roaring Creek	Slabtown Junction	Columbia	40°54′27″N 76°24′44″W
PA-633	Seitzville Road Bridge	Extant	Reinforced concrete closed-spandrel arch	1910	2003	Seitzville Road	South Branch Codorus Creek	Seven Valleys	York	39°49′46″N 76°45′40″W
PA-638	King's Bridge	Extant	Burr truss	1806	2005	PA 653 (former)	Laurel Hill Creek	Middlecreek Township	Somerset	39°56′15″N 79°16′17″W
PA-645	Structural Study of Smith Trusses		Smith truss		2012	Structural analyses of Kidd's Mill Bridge et al.		Greenville	Mercer	
PA-649-A	Carrie Blast Furnaces 6 and 7, Hot Metal Bridge	Extant	Pennsylvania truss	1900	2008	Union Railroad	Monongahela River	Rankin and Munhall	Allegheny	39°56′15″N 79°16′17″W

== See also ==
- List of tunnels documented by the Historic American Engineering Record in Pennsylvania
