= Porter Township, Lycoming County, Pennsylvania =

Township in Pennsylvania, US

- Township
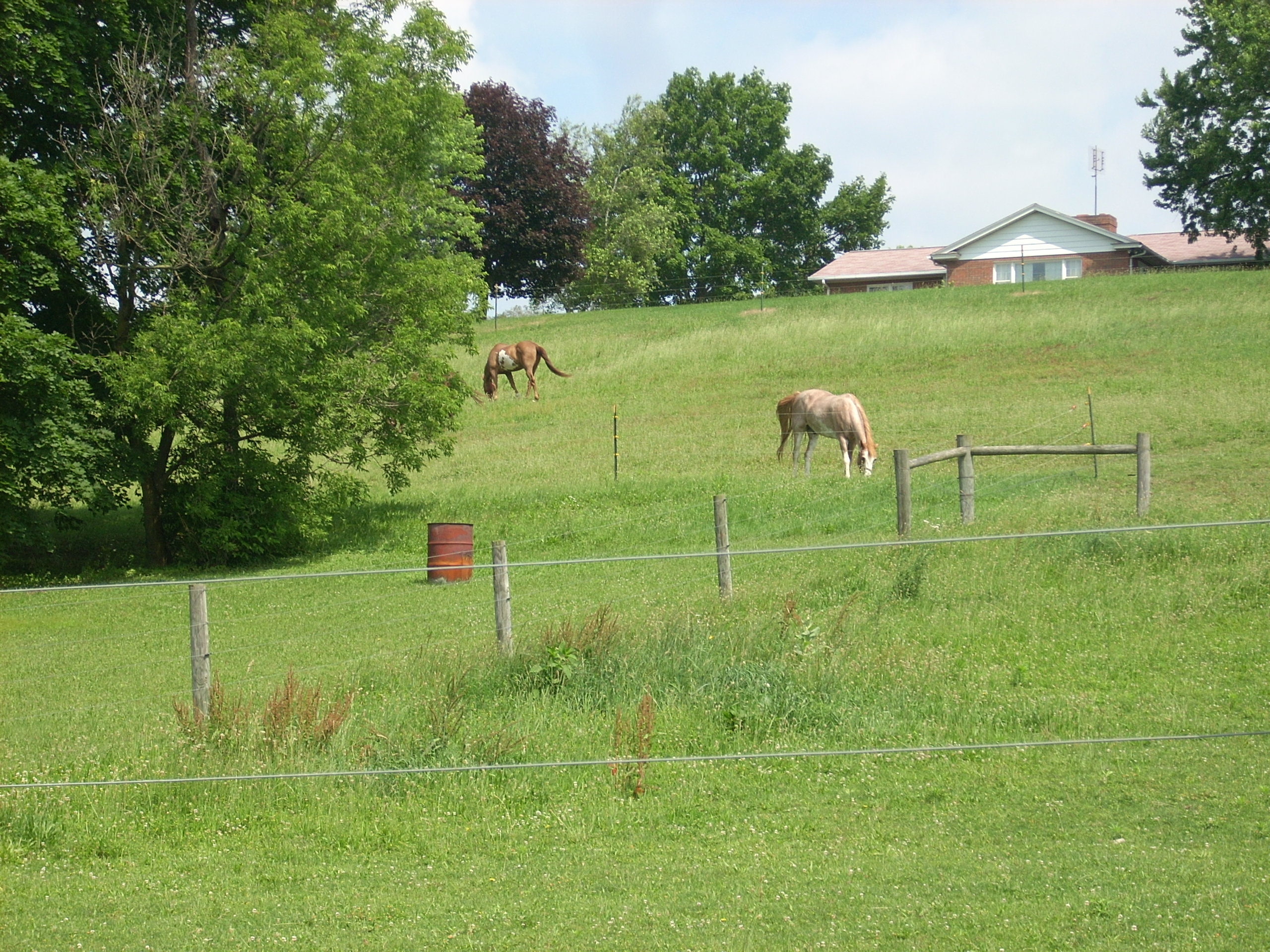
- Porter Township

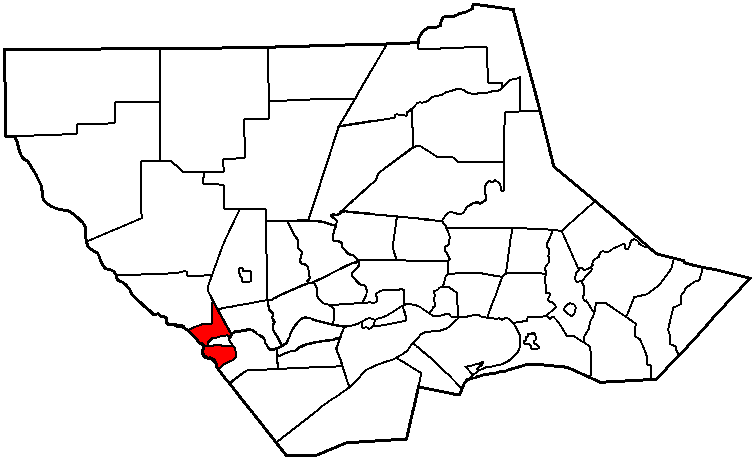
- Map of Lycoming County, Pennsylvania highlighting Porter Township

- Map of Lycoming County, Pennsylvania
- Coordinates: 41°12′20″N 77°16′32″W
- Country: United States
- State: Pennsylvania
- County: Lycoming
- Settled: 1772
- Incorporated: 1840

Area
  - Total: 7.90 sq mi (20.47 km^{2})
  - Land: 7.61 sq mi (19.70 km^{2})
  - Water: 0.30 sq mi (0.77 km^{2})
- Elevation: 899 ft (274 m)

Population (2020)
  - Total: 1,535 ▼
  - Estimate (2021): 1,528
  - Density: 207/sq mi (79.8/km^{2})
- Time zone: UTC-5 (Eastern (EST))
  - Summer (DST): UTC-4 (EDT)
- FIPS code: 42-081-62184
- GNIS feature ID: 1216771

Porter Township is a township in Lycoming County, Pennsylvania, United States. The population was 1,535 at the 2020 census. It is part of the Williamsport Metropolitan Statistical Area.

== History ==
Porter Township, named for David R. Porter, governor of Pennsylvania (1839–1845), was formed from part of Mifflin Township on May 6, 1840.

When colonial settlers first arrived in what is now Porter Township, they were outside the western boundary of what was then the Province of Pennsylvania. These settlers were not under the jurisdiction or protection of any type from any of the Thirteen Colonies. They became known as the Fair Play Men. These men established their own form of government, known as the "Fair Play System", with three elected commissioners who ruled on land claims and other issues for the group. In a remarkable coincidence, the Fair Play Men made their own Declaration of Independence from Britain on July 4, 1776, beneath the "Tiadaghton Elm" on the banks of Pine Creek.

During the American Revolutionary War, settlements throughout the Susquehanna valley were attacked by Loyalists and Native Americans allied with the British. After the Wyoming Valley battle and massacre in the summer of 1778 (near what is now Wilkes-Barre) and smaller local attacks, the "Big Runaway" occurred throughout the West Branch Susquehanna valley. Settlers fled feared and actual attacks by the British and their allies. Homes and fields were abandoned, with livestock driven along and a few possessions floated on rafts on the river east to Muncy, then further south to Sunbury. The abandoned property was burnt by the attackers. Some settlers soon returned, only to flee again in the summer of 1779 in the "Little Runaway". Sullivan's Expedition helped stabilize the area and encouraged resettlement, which continued after the war.

Dr. James Davidson, a veteran of the American Revolution, serving as a doctor for General Anthony Wayne's army, was one of the first and most successful settlers in the Porter Township area. He settled in the Sunbury area just after the Revolution. After several years in that vicinity he bought a farm along the West Branch Susquehanna River in what is now western Lycoming County. Here he farmed and also served as the only doctor in the area for many years. Dr. Davidson built one of the first brick houses in the West Branch Susquehanna Valley. He also served as a judge for Lycoming County after it was formed in 1795.

The Bridge in Porter Township was added to the National Register of Historic Places in 1988.

== Geography ==
Porter Township is in western Lycoming County and is bordered by Watson Township to the north and west, Clinton County to the west, Nippenose Township to the south and east, Piatt Township to the east, and Mifflin Township to the northeast. Porter Township nearly surrounds the borough of Jersey Shore. The Nippenose Township border is formed by the West Branch Susquehanna River, and the Clinton County border is formed by Pine Creek, a tributary of the West Branch. U.S. Route 220 crosses the center of the township, along the northern boundary with Jersey Shore; it leads east 15 miles (24 km) to Williamsport, the county seat, and southwest 12 miles (19 km) to Lock Haven. Pennsylvania Route 44 joins US-220 across the center of the township but leads southeastward 23 miles (37 km) to Allenwood and northwest 70 miles (110 km) to Coudersport.

According to the United States Census Bureau, the township has a total area of 7.9 square miles (20.5 km^{2}), of which 7.6 square miles (19.7 km^{2}) are land and 0.3 square miles (0.8 km^{2}), or 3.76%, are water.

== Demographics ==
Historical population
Census	Pop.	Note	%±
2010	1,601		—
2020	1,535		−4.1%
2021 (est.)	1,528		−0.5%
U.S. Decennial Census

As of the census of 2000, there were 1,633 people, 642 households, and 471 families residing in the township. The population density was 213.6 inhabitants per square mile (82.5/km^{2}). There were 662 housing units at an average density of 86.6 per square mile (33.4/km^{2}). The racial makeup of the township was 98.59% White, 0.43% African American, 0.18% Native American, 0.37% Asian, 0.06% Pacific Islander, 0.06% from other races, and 0.31% from two or more races. Hispanic or Latino of any race were 0.18% of the population.

There were 642 households, out of which 29.3% had children under the age of 18 living with them, 60.3% were married couples living together, 7.8% had a female householder with no husband present, and 26.6% were non-families. 22.6% of all households were made up of individuals, and 15.0% had someone living alone who was 65 years of age or older. The average household size was 2.54 and the average family size was 2.97.

In the township the population was spread out, with 23.6% under the age of 18, 7.2% from 18 to 24, 24.7% from 25 to 44, 26.9% from 45 to 64, and 17.6% who were 65 years of age or older. The median age was 41 years. For every 100 females there were 89.9 males. For every 100 females age 18 and over, there were 89.7 males.

The median income for a household in the township was $31,756, and the median income for a family was $38,083. Males had a median income of $30,701 versus $19,375 for females. The per capita income for the township was $16,030. About 5.3% of families and 7.2% of the population were below the poverty line, including 7.0% of those under age 18 and 7.1% of those age 65 or over.
