= Watson Township, Lycoming County, Pennsylvania =

Township in Pennsylvania, US

- Township
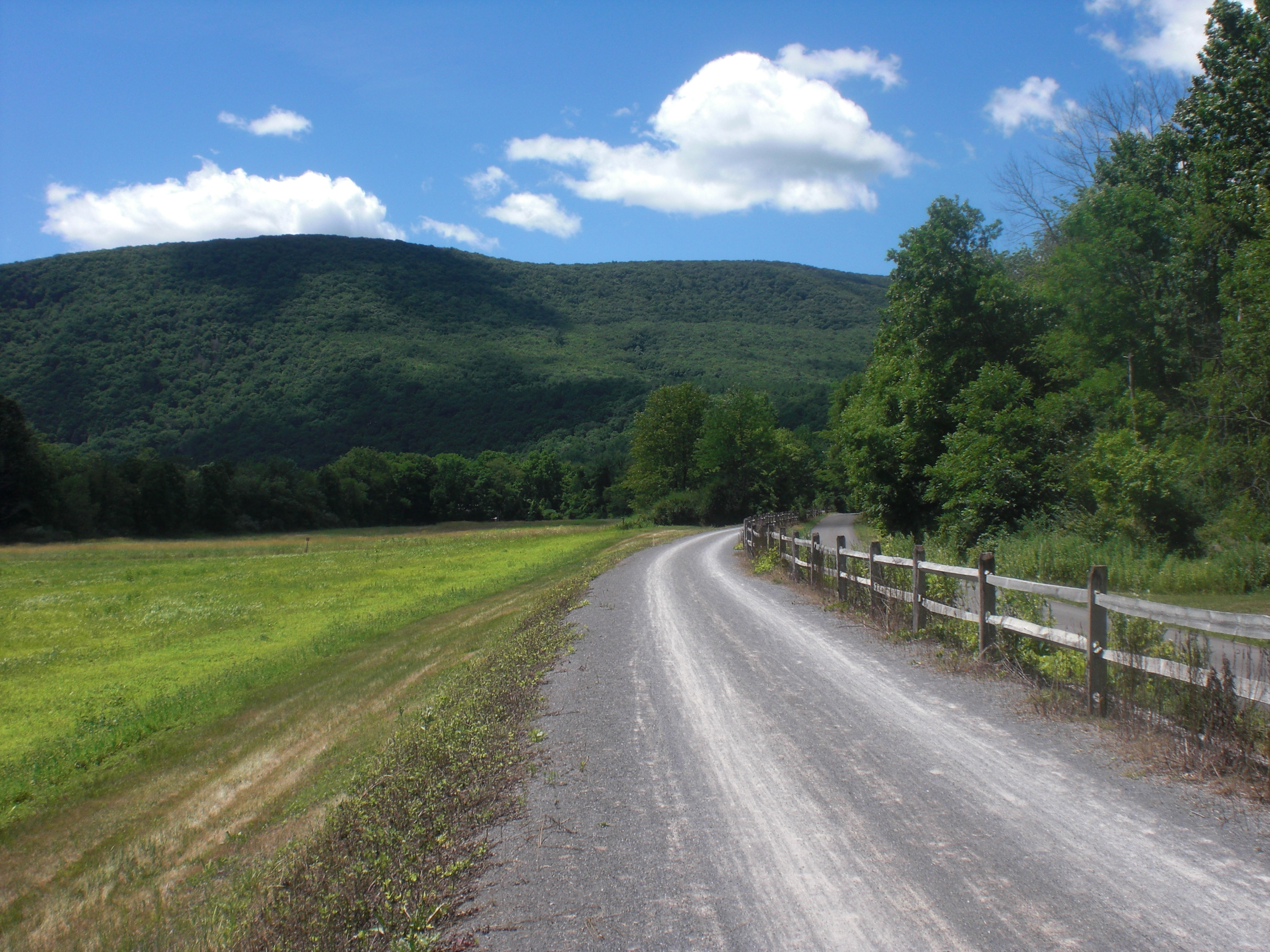
- Pine Creek Rail Trail in Watson Township

- Logo

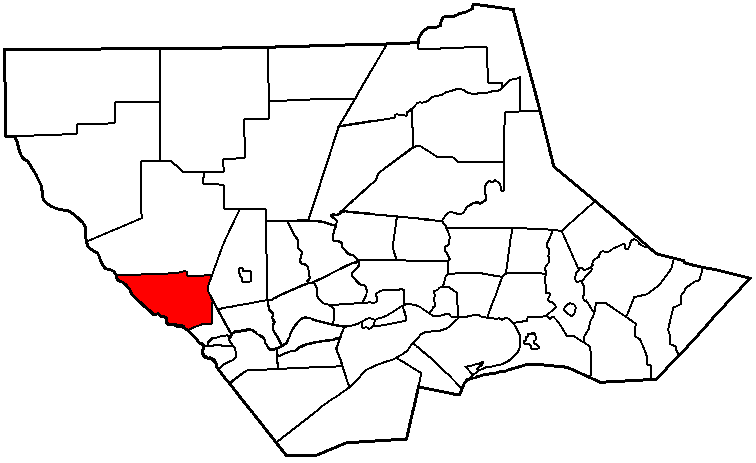
- Map of Lycoming County, Pennsylvania highlighting Watson Township

- Map of Lycoming County, Pennsylvania
- Coordinates: 41°14′53″N 77°19′21″W
- Country: United States
- State: Pennsylvania
- County: Lycoming
- Settled: 1784
- Incorporated: 1845

Government
  - Type: Board of Supervisors
  - Chairman: James Seltzer
  - Vice-chairman: James Potter
  - Supervisor and Roadmaster: Gene Zinck

Area
  - Total: 23.42 sq mi (60.66 km^{2})
  - Land: 23.03 sq mi (59.66 km^{2})
  - Water: 0.39 sq mi (1.01 km^{2})
- Elevation: 1,699 ft (518 m)

Population (2020)
  - Total: 534 ▼
  - Estimate (2021): 533
  - Density: 23.1/sq mi (8.93/km^{2})
- Time zone: UTC-5 (Eastern (EST))
  - Summer (DST): UTC-4 (EDT)
- FIPS code: 42-081-81576
- GNIS feature ID: 1216776
- Website: watsontownship-pa.com

Watson Township is a township in Lycoming County, Pennsylvania, United States. The population was 534 at the 2020 census. It is part of the Williamsport Metropolitan Statistical Area.

== History ==
Watson Township was formed in January 1848 from parts of Porter and Cummings townships. It is named for Oliver Watson, the president of a bank in nearby Williamsport at the time.

Watson Township is and always has been a largely unpopulated area. It is mountainous and covered with a thriving second-growth forest. During the late 1800s much of the land was stripped of its old-growth forests. At the time central Pennsylvania and the city of Williamsport were at the center of the lumber industry in the United States. Trees were cut down and floated down Pine Creek, which flows through Watson Township. There were several sawmills along Pine Creek in the township. Other early attempts at industry included an iron forge along Furnace Run. There were several deposits of iron ore in Watson Township, but the ore proved to be of low quality and the investors in the iron furnaces struggled to turn a profit. The furnaces were abandoned and little evidence of their existence remains.

== Geography ==
Watson Township is in western Lycoming County and is bordered by Clinton County to the west, Cummings Township to the north, Mifflin Township to the east, and Porter Township to the south. The township is 7 miles (11 km) north of the borough of Jersey Shore, 20 miles (32 km) west of Williamsport, the Lycoming county seat, and 106 miles (171 km) north-northwest of Harrisburg, the state capital.

Pennsylvania Route 44 crosses the center of the township, following Pine Creek and passing through the unincorporated communities of Torbert and Tombs Run. PA-44 leads south to Jersey Shore and northwest 65 miles (105 km) to Coudersport.

According to the United States Census Bureau, the township has a total area of 23.4 square miles (60.7 km^{2}), of which 23.1 square miles (59.9 km^{2}) are land and 0.3 square miles (0.8 km^{2}), or 1.33%, are water. Pine Creek crosses the center of the township, flowing south to the West Branch Susquehanna River south of Jersey Shore.

== Demographics ==
Historical population
Census	Pop.	Note	%±
2010	537		—
2020	534		−0.6%
2021 (est.)	533		−0.2%
U.S. Decennial Census

As of the census of 2000, there were 550 people, 220 households, and 168 families residing in the township. The population density was 23.7 people per square mile (9.2/km^{2}). There were 285 housing units at an average density of 12.3/sq mi (4.7/km^{2}). The racial makeup of the township was 98.73% White, 0.18% African American, and 1.09% from two or more races.

There were 220 households, out of which 25.5% had children under the age of 18 living with them, 68.6% were married couples living together, 4.1% had a female householder with no husband present, and 23.6% were non-families. 19.1% of all households were made up of individuals, and 7.3% had someone living alone who was 65 years of age or older. The average household size was 2.50 and the average family size was 2.83.

In the township the population was spread out, with 18.9% under the age of 18, 10.7% from 18 to 24, 22.2% from 25 to 44, 36.5% from 45 to 64, and 11.6% who were 65 years of age or older. The median age was 44 years. For every 100 females there were 107.5 males. For every 100 females age 18 and over, there were 105.5 males.

The median income for a household in the township was $40,250, and the median income for a family was $45,526. Males had a median income of $33,558 versus $21,607 for females. The per capita income for the township was $19,406. About 9.5% of families and 10.5% of the population were below the poverty line, including 8.0% of those under age 18 and 13.0% of those age 65 or over.
