= Bridge in Brown Township =

- U.S. National Register of Historic Places
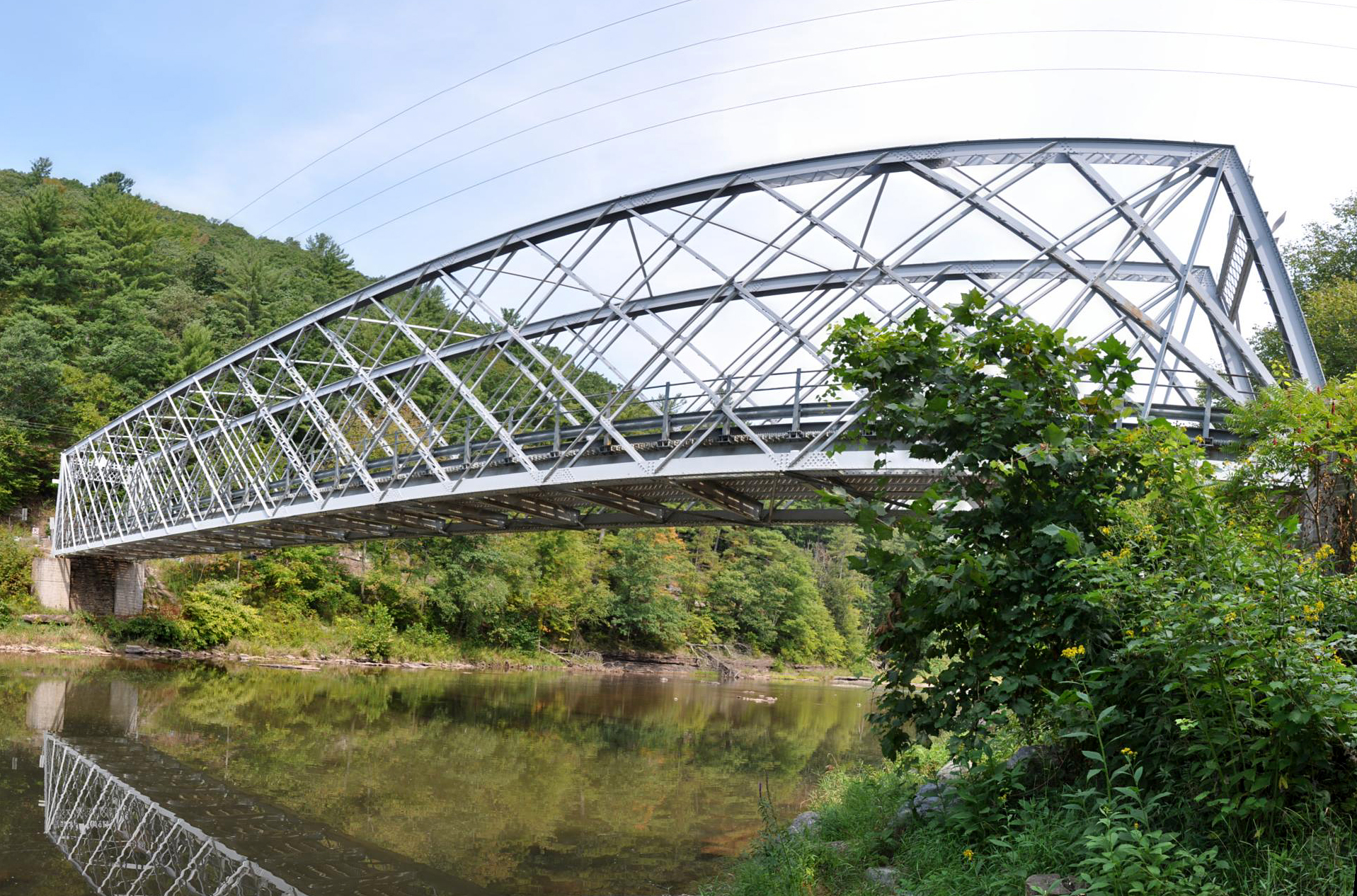
- Panorama of the bridge in 2012

- Location within Pennsylvania Location within the United States
- Location: PA 414 (LR 41022) over Pine Creek, Brown Township, Lycoming County, Pennsylvania
- Coordinates: 41°29′11″N 77°29′50″W
- Area: less than one acre
- Built: 1890
- Architectural style: lattice truss
- MPS: Highway Bridges Owned by the Commonwealth of Pennsylvania, Department of Transportation TR
- NRHP reference No.: 88000844
- Added to NRHP: June 22, 1988

Bridge in Brown Township is a historic lattice truss bridge spanning Pine Creek at PA 414 in Brown Township, Lycoming County, Pennsylvania. It was built in 1890, by the Berlin Iron Bridge Co. of East Berlin, Connecticut. The bridge measures 227 feet (69 m) long and 19 feet (5.8 m) wide.

It was added to the National Register of Historic Places in 1988.

== Gallery ==
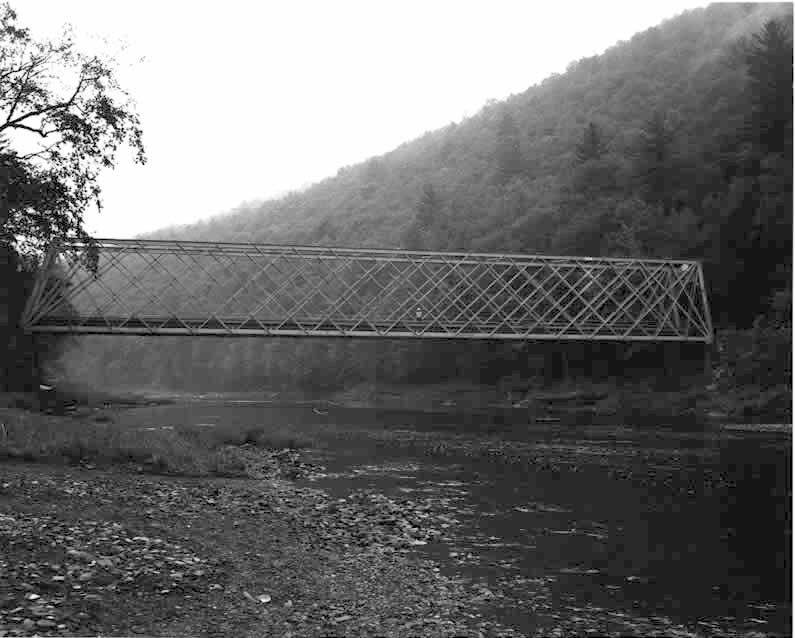
Bridge in Brown Township, 1982

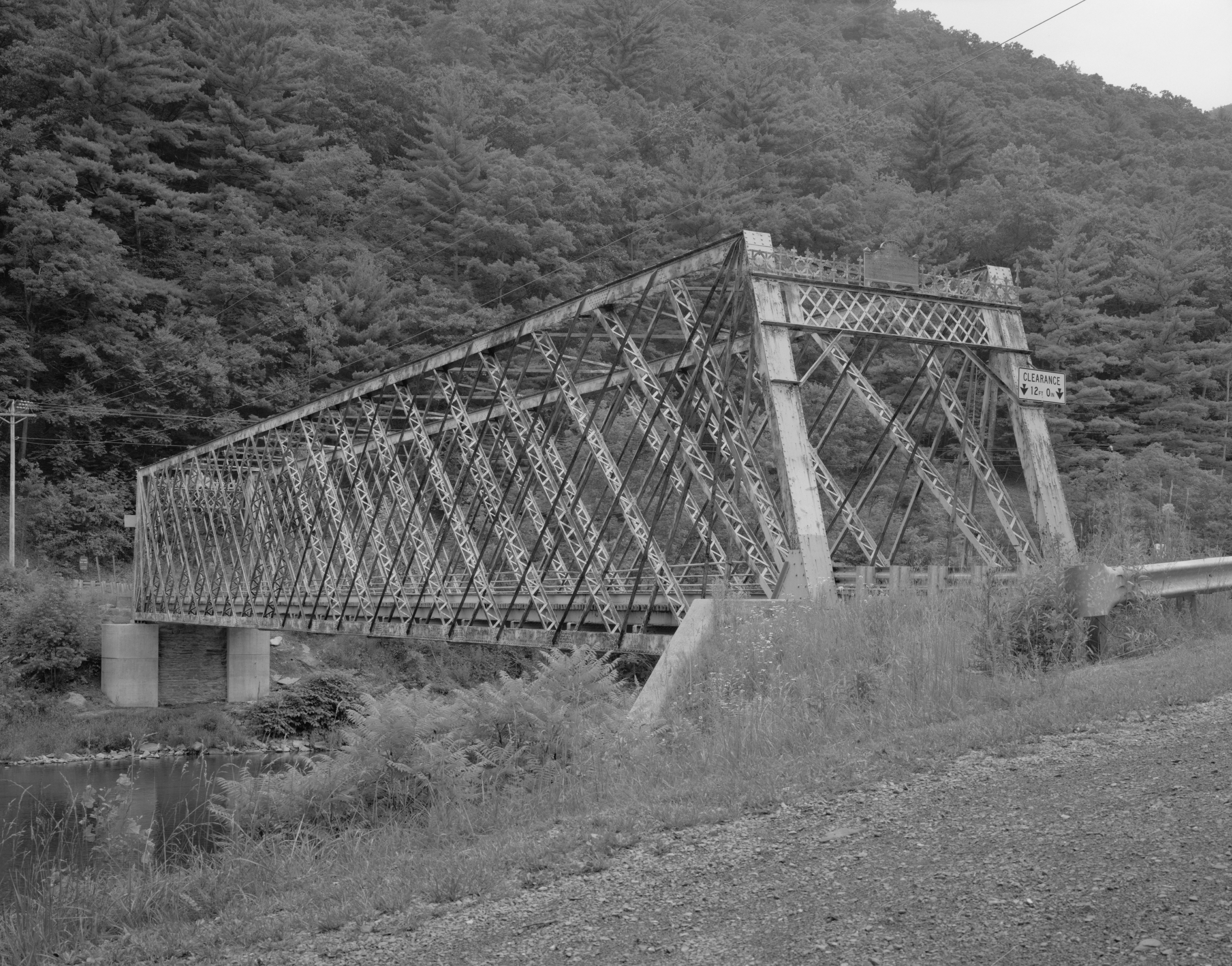
HAER photograph by Joseph Elliott, 1997

== See also ==
- List of bridges documented by the Historic American Engineering Record in Pennsylvania
