= English Center Suspension Bridge =

- U.S. National Register of Historic Places
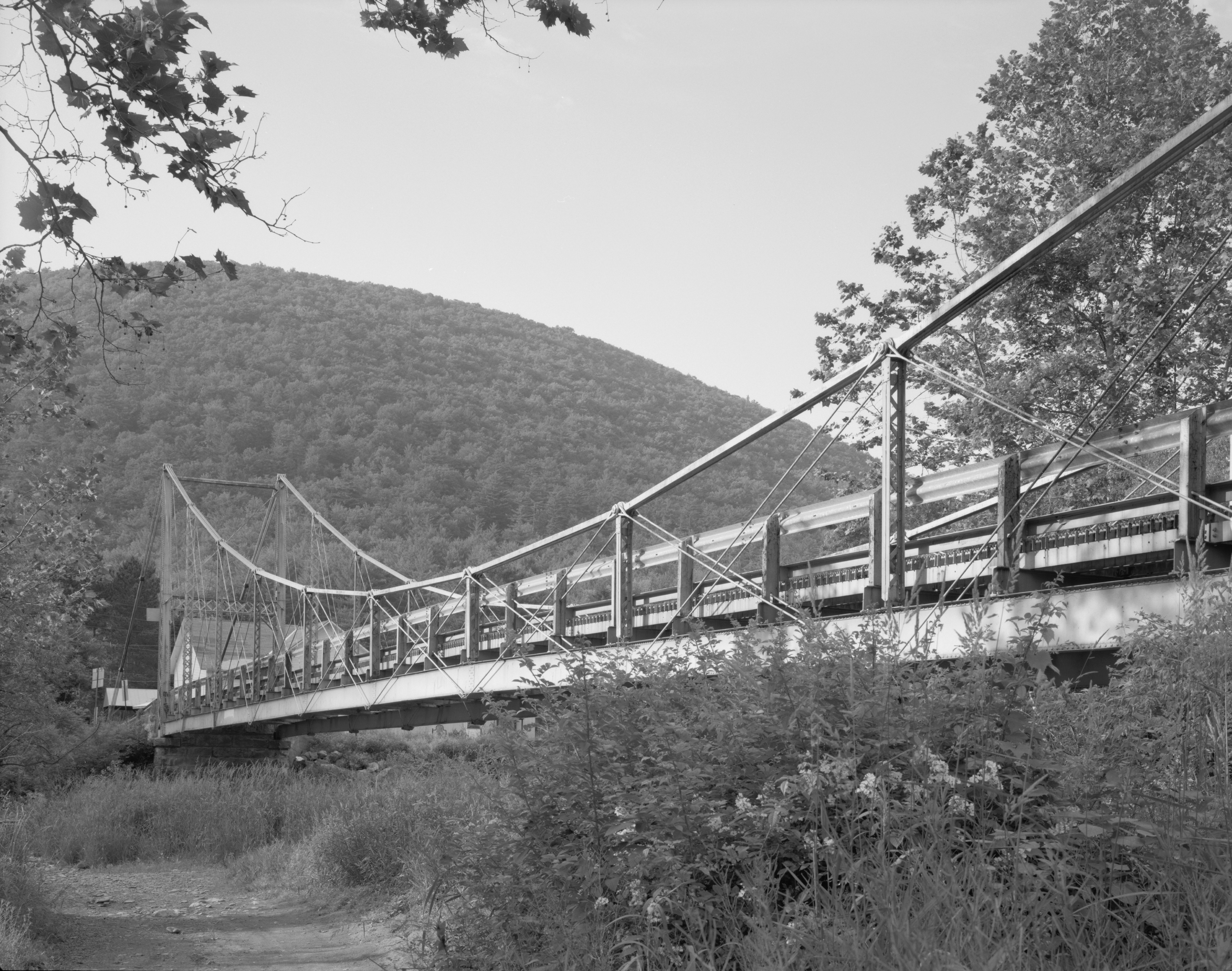
- English Center Suspension Bridge, 1997

- Location within Pennsylvania Location within the United States
- Location: Over Pine Creek, Pine Township, Pennsylvania
- Coordinates: 41°26′5″N 77°17′21″W
- Area: 0.1 acres (0.040 ha)
- Built: 1891
- Architect: Dean & Westerbrooke
- Architectural style: Suspension Bridge
- NRHP reference No.: 78002428
- Added to NRHP: December 14, 1978

English Center Suspension Bridge is a historic suspension bridge spanning Little Pine Creek in Pine Township, Lycoming County, Pennsylvania. It was built in 1891 and has a single span measuring 300 feet (91 m) long and 15 feet (4.6 m) wide.

It was added to the National Register of Historic Places in 1978.

== See also ==
- List of bridges documented by the Historic American Engineering Record in Pennsylvania
