= Bridge in City of Wilkes-Barre =

- U.S. National Register of Historic Places
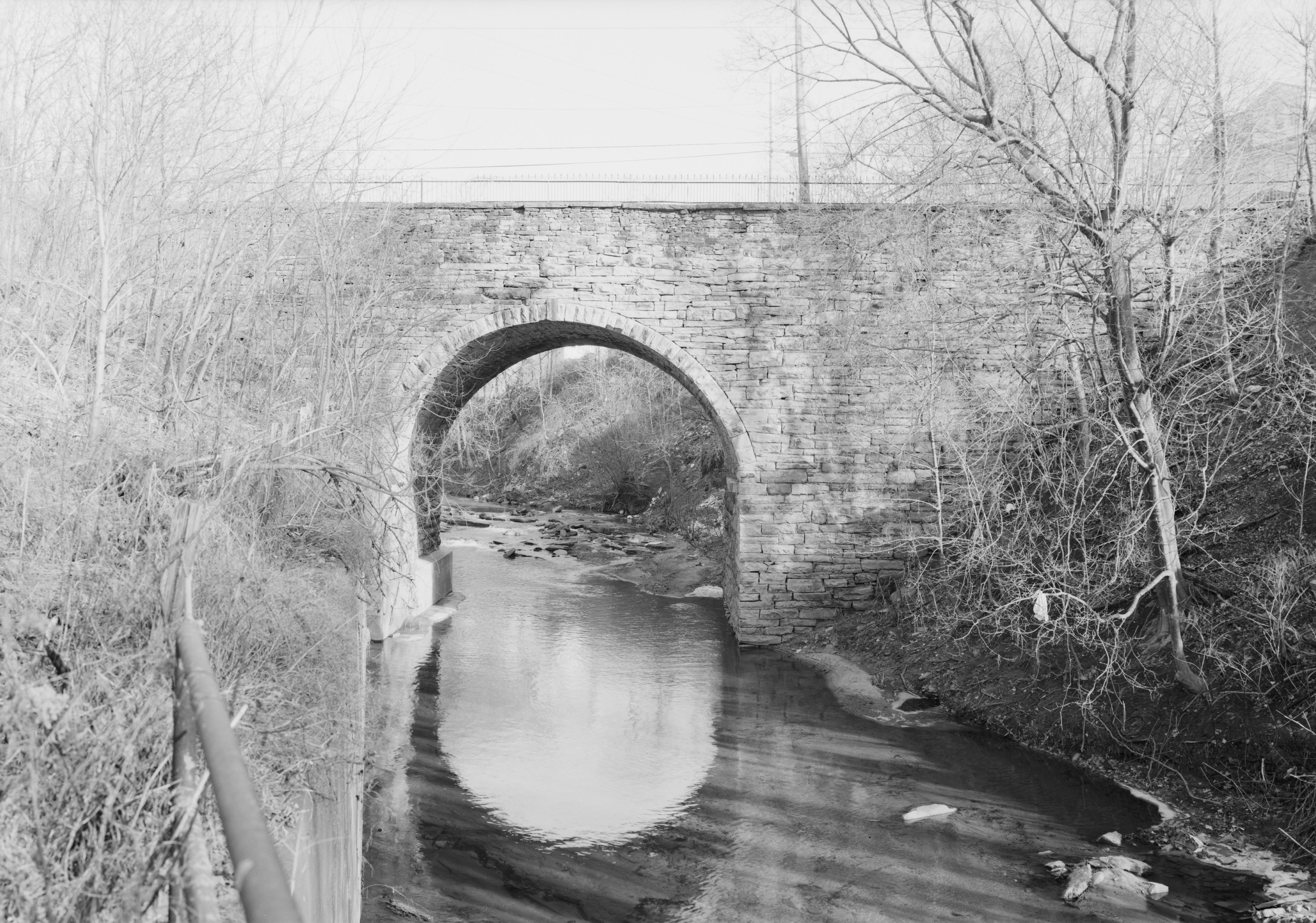
- Bridge in City of Wilkes-Barre, Summer 1999

- Location within Pennsylvania Location within the United States
- Location: LR 5 (River Street) (SR 2004) over Mill Creek, Wilkes-Barre, Pennsylvania
- Coordinates: 41°15′36″N 75°52′2″W
- Area: less than one acre
- Architectural style: Single span stone arch
- MPS: Highway Bridges Owned by the Commonwealth of Pennsylvania, Department of Transportation TR
- NRHP reference No.: 88000828
- Added to NRHP: June 22, 1988

Bridge in City of Wilkes-Barre is a historic stone arch bridge spanning Mill Creek in Wilkes-Barre, Luzerne County, Pennsylvania. It is a 75-foot-long (23 m) bridge with a single 39-foot-long (12 m) span.

It was listed on the National Register of Historic Places in 1988.

== See also ==
- List of bridges documented by the Historic American Engineering Record in Pennsylvania
