= Pennsylvania Railroad Old Bridge over Standing Stone Creek =

- U.S. National Register of Historic Places
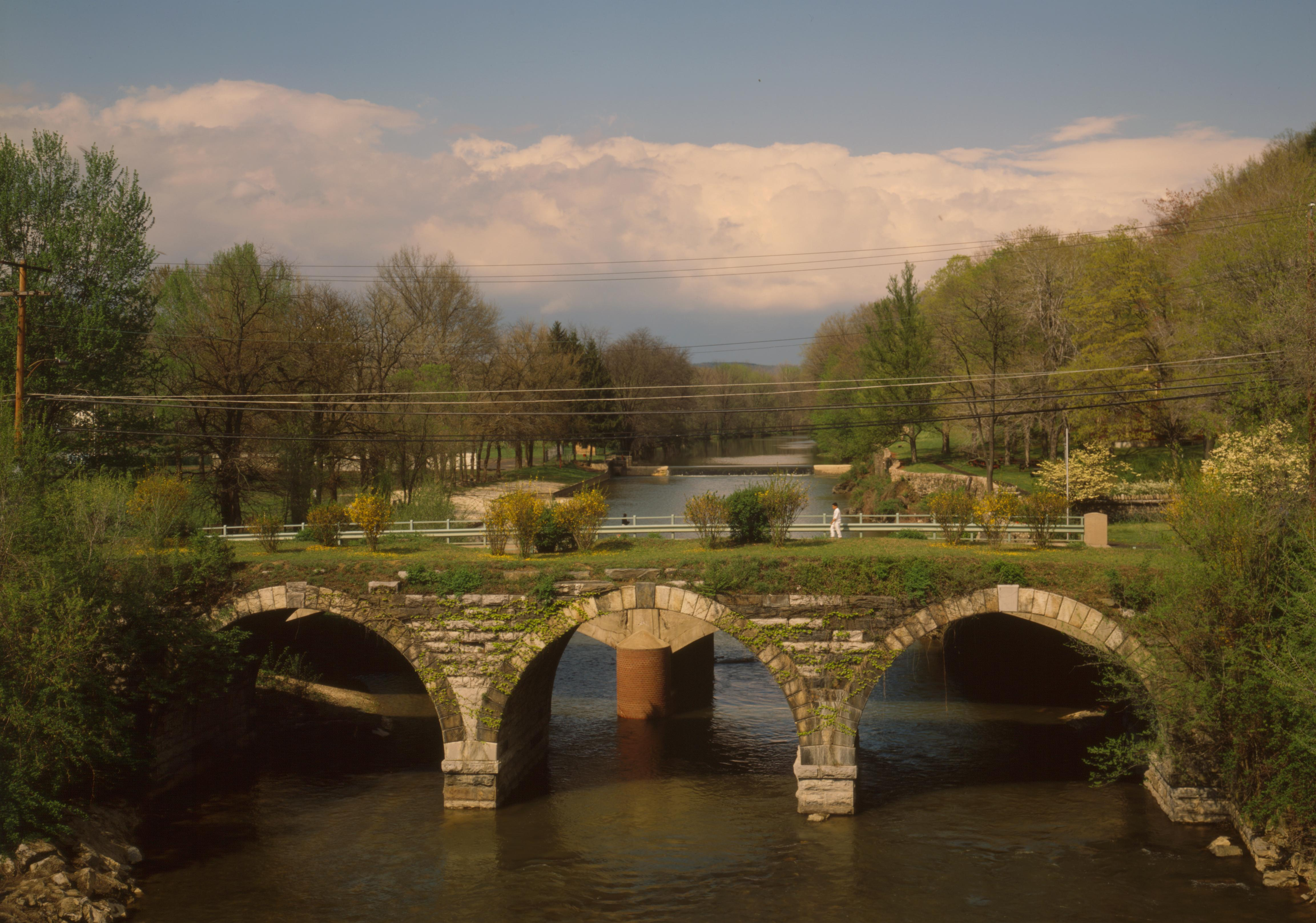
- Pennsylvania Railroad Old Bridge over Standing Stone Creek, May 1989

- Location within Pennsylvania Location within the United States
- Location: South of Penn Street over Standing Stone Creek, Huntingdon, Pennsylvania
- Coordinates: 40°28′51″N 78°0′16″W
- Area: less than one acre
- Built: 1848–1850
- Architectural style: Stone arch bridge
- MPS: Industrial Resources of Huntingdon County, 1780--1939 MPS
- NRHP reference No.: 90000410
- Added to NRHP: March 20, 1990

The Pennsylvania Railroad Old Bridge over Standing Stone Creek, also known as the Conrail Old Bridge over Standing Stone Creek, is an historic, multi-span, stone arch bridge that spans Standing Stone Creek and is located in Huntingdon, Huntingdon County, Pennsylvania, United States.

It was added to the National Register of Historic Places in 1990.

== History and architectural features ==
This historic structure was built by the Pennsylvania Railroad between 1848 and 1850, and was in use until 1892, when the main line was relocated onto the former Pennsylvania Canal bed. A second stone arch bridge was constructed nearby for the new alignment.

== See also ==
- List of bridges documented by the Historic American Engineering Record in Pennsylvania
