= Bridge in Porter Township =

- U.S. National Register of Historic Places
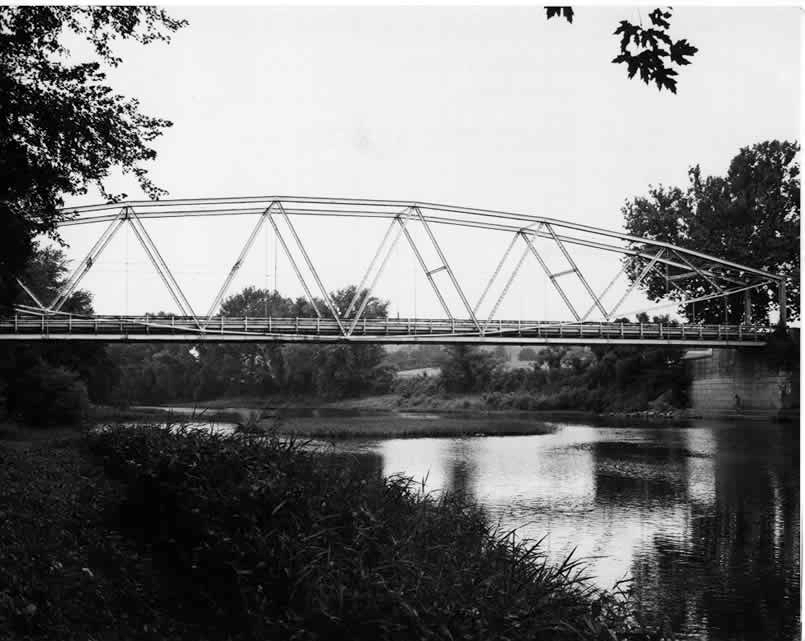
- Bridge in Porter Township, 1982

- Location within Pennsylvania Location within the United States
- Location: LR 41022 over Pine Creek, Porter Township, Pennsylvania
- Coordinates: 41°10′51″N 77°16′44″W
- Area: less than one acre
- Built: 1889
- Architectural style: lenticular truss
- MPS: Highway Bridges Owned by the Commonwealth of Pennsylvania, Department of Transportation TR
- NRHP reference No.: 88000842
- Added to NRHP: June 22, 1988

Bridge in Porter Township is a historic lenticular truss bridge spanning Pine Creek at Porter Township, Lycoming County, Pennsylvania. It was built in 1889, and is a single-span bridge that measures 287 feet (87 m) long and 20 feet (6.1 m) wide.

It was added to the National Register of Historic Places in 1988.

== See also ==
- List of bridges documented by the Historic American Engineering Record in Pennsylvania
