= Bridge in East Fallowfield Township (Mortonville, Pennsylvania) =

- Mortonville Bridge
- Formerly listed on the U.S. National Register of Historic Places
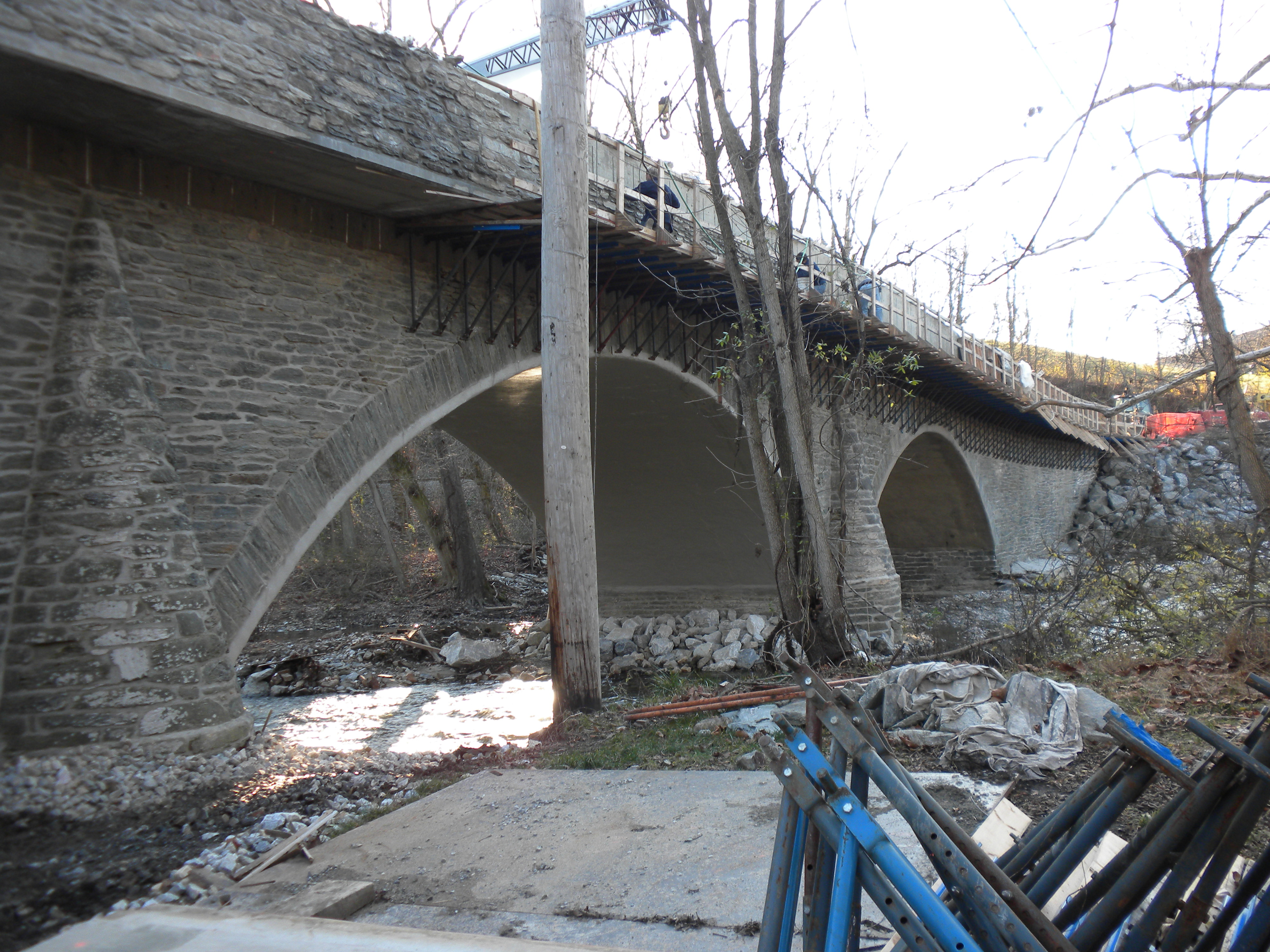
- Mortonville Bridge being widened in 2009.

- Location within Pennsylvania Location within the United States
- Coordinates: 39°56′47″N 75°46′47″W
- Area: 2.1 acres (0.85 ha)
- Built: 1826
- Architectural style: Stone arch
- MPS: Strasburg Road TR;East Fallowfield Township MRA
- NRHP reference No.: 85002392

Significant dates
- Added to NRHP: September 18, 1985
- Removed from NRHP: July 16, 2010

- Bridge in East Fallowfield Township
- U.S. National Register of Historic Places
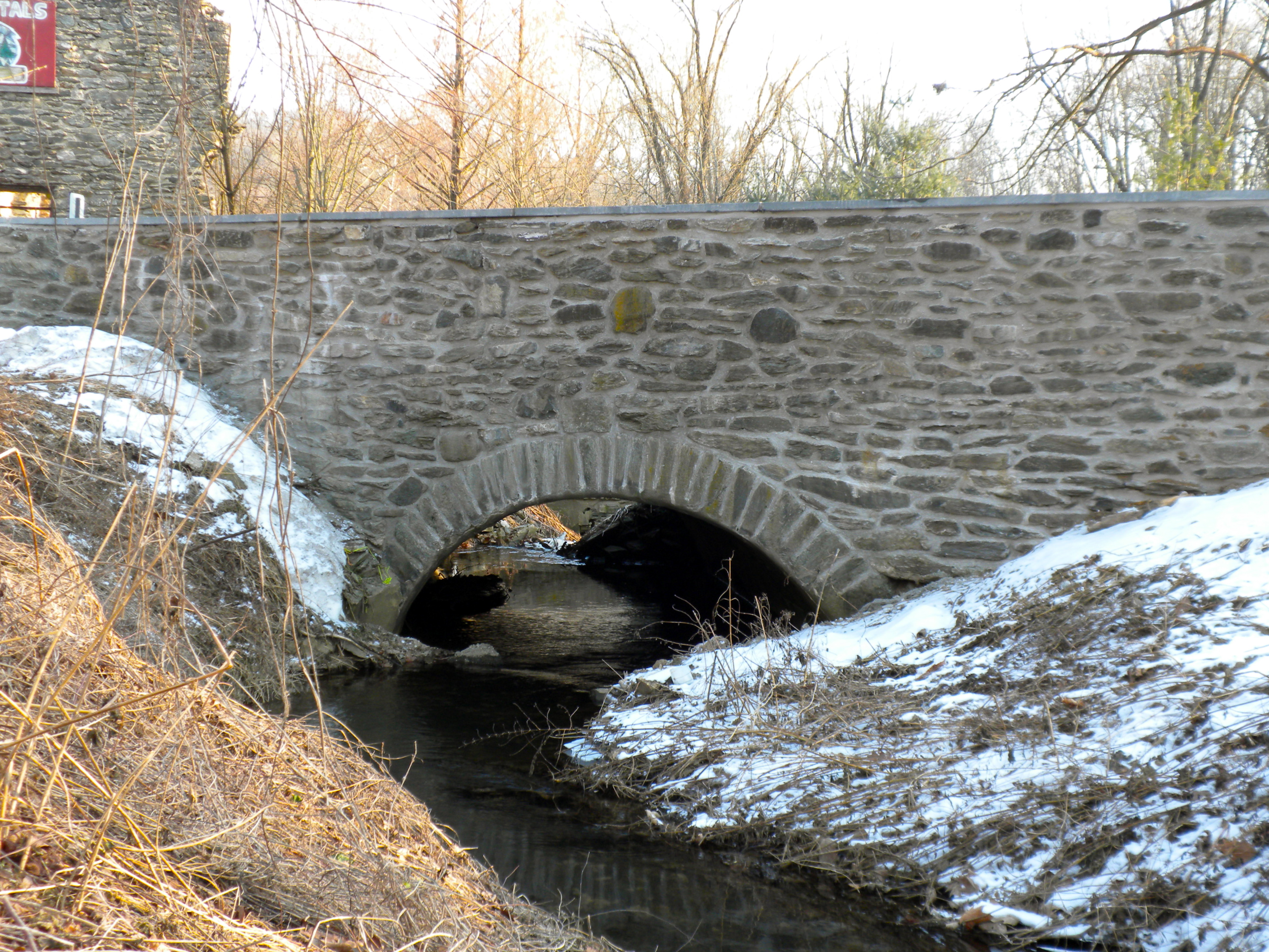
- Mill Race Bridge, with ruins of mill in background.
- Location: Strasburg Road over Mill Race, Mortonville, Pennsylvania
- Coordinates: 39°56′46″N 75°46′43″W
- Area: less than one acre
- MPS: Highway Bridges Owned by the Commonwealth of Pennsylvania, Department of Transportation TR
- NRHP reference No.: 88000878
- Added to NRHP: June 22, 1988

The Mortonville Bridge and Mill Race Bridge are stone arch bridges carrying Strasburg Road across the West Branch Brandywine Creek and an abandoned millrace at Mortonville, Pennsylvania. The Mortonville Bridge was placed on the National Register of Historic Places on September 18, 1985, while the Mill Race Bridge was added as the Bridge in East Fallowfield Township on June 22, 1988. The Mortonville Bridge was removed from the Register on July 16, 2010, following reconstruction; the Mill Race Bridge remains registered.

The first bridges on the site were probably built about 1772 when Strasburg Road was surveyed and constructed. A wooden bridge over the Brandywine was built in 1789. Of the current bridges, the millrace bridge was built about 1800 as a single stone arch, using stone from a local quarry upstream. It spanned the head race for Hayes Mill. A four-arch stone bridge over the Brandywine replaced the 1789 wooden structure in 1826, also using local stone.

From the 1980s to 2002, PennDOT put forth a series of plans for the replacement of both bridges by a single modern structure. However, local opposition was considerable, and PennDOT ultimately rebuilt and widened the bridge by 6 feet (1.8 m) in 2009 during a 10-month closure. It was closed again in 2010 to lengthen retaining walls on the approach.

== See also ==
- List of bridges documented by the Historic American Engineering Record in Pennsylvania
- List of bridges on the National Register of Historic Places in Pennsylvania
