= Standing Stone Creek =

River in the United States of America

Coordinates: 40°33′50″N 77°55′18″W

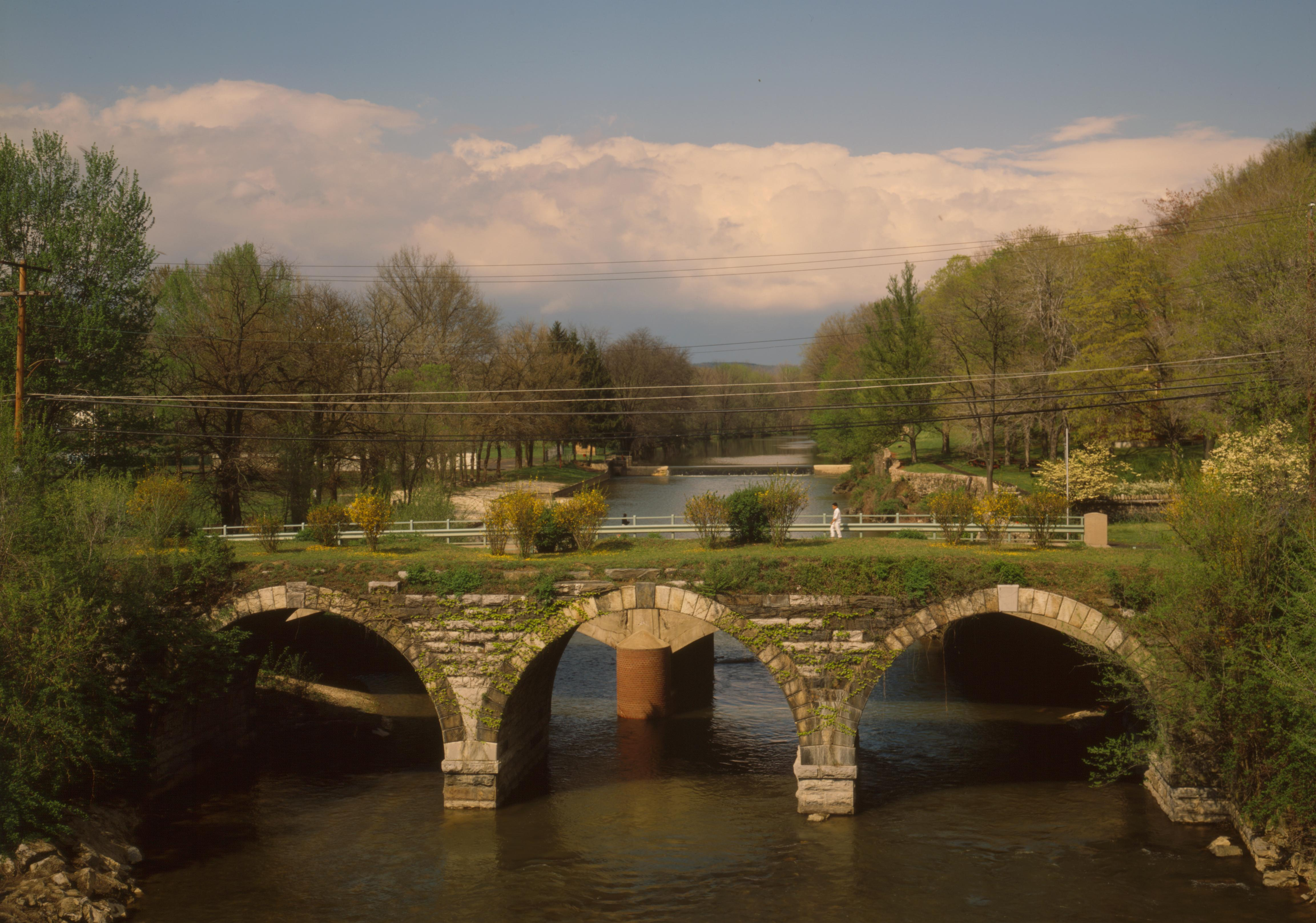
Standing Stone Creek near its mouth in Huntingdon

Standing Stone Creek is a 34.2-mile-long (55.0 km) tributary of the Juniata River in Huntingdon and Centre counties, Pennsylvania, in the United States.

Allegedly, when the first European visitors arrived at the creek's mouth, they found a Native American camp whose lodges were arranged in a circle, centered by a 14-foot-high, six-inch-square stone pillar, marked with petroglyphs. When the Native Americans left, they took the stone with them. But the creek's name remains in memory of that monument.

Standing Stone Creek begins in Centre County within Rothrock State Forest, just north of Penn-Roosevelt State Park. Standing Stone Creek joins the Juniata River in the borough of Huntingdon.

== Bridges ==
- The Pennsylvania Railroad Old Bridge over Standing Stone Creek crosses Standing Stone Creek at Huntingdon, Huntingdon County, Pennsylvania.

== See also ==
- List of rivers of Pennsylvania
