= Mortonville, Pennsylvania =

Unincorporated area in Pennsylvania, U.S.

- Mortonville Hotel
- U.S. National Register of Historic Places
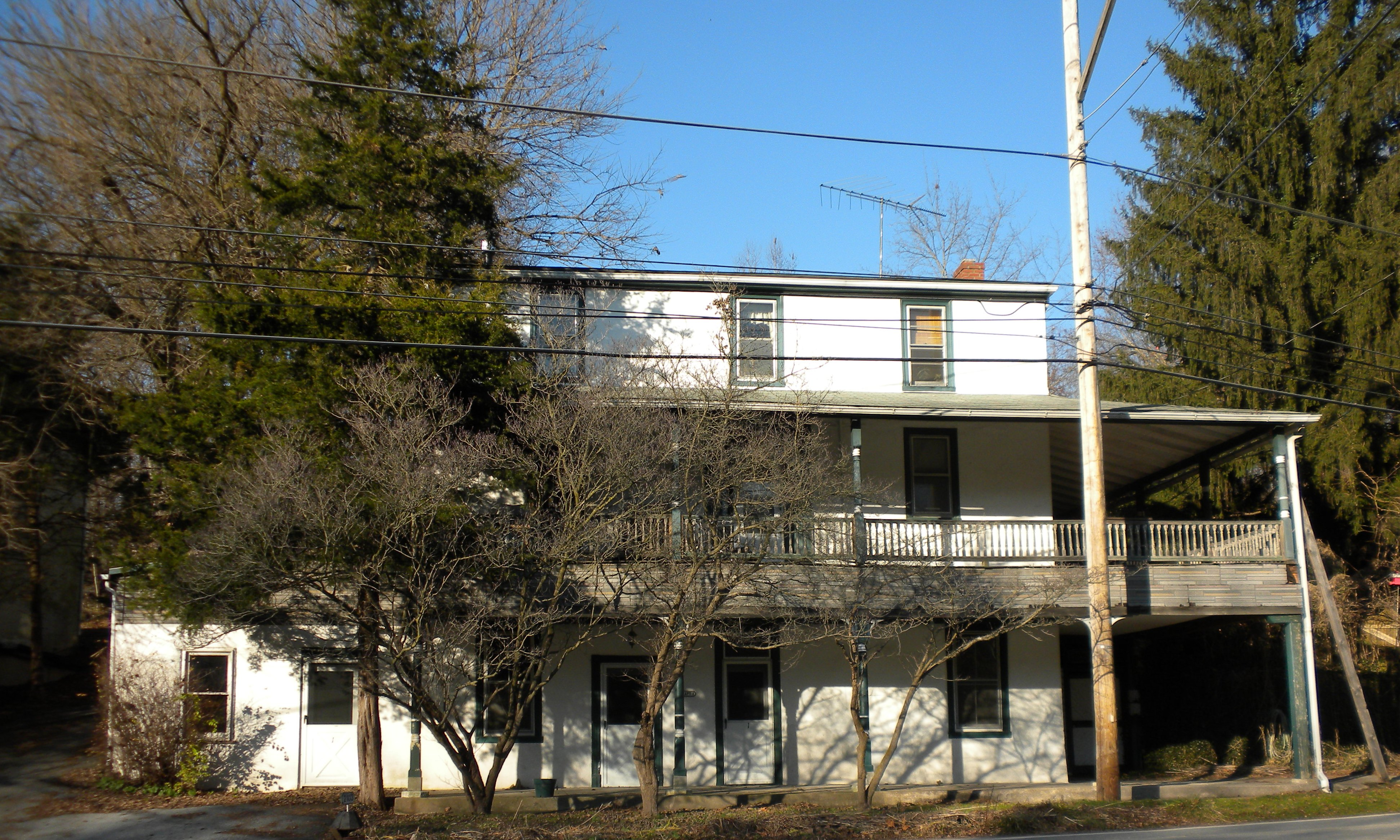

- Location within Pennsylvania Location within the United States
- Nearest city: Coatesville, Pennsylvania
- Coordinates: 39°56′48″N 75°46′39″W
- Area: 1 acre (0.40 ha)
- Built: 1796
- Architectural style: Federal
- MPS: Strasburg Road TR;East Fallowfield Township MRA
- NRHP reference No.: 85002393
- Added to NRHP: September 18, 1985

Mortonville is an unincorporated area and historic hamlet in Chester County, Pennsylvania, United States, situated on the eastern bank of the West Branch Brandywine Creek. It consists of approximately one-half dozen structures, two of which are on the National Register of Historic Places: the Mortonville Hotel, and the 12.5-foot-long (3.8 m) "Bridge in East Fallowfield Township" which crosses a mill race a few feet east of a larger bridge. The larger bridge, known as the Mortonville Bridge, was also listed on the NRHP until 2010, when it was delisted following a renovation. The two bridges are in East Fallowfield Township, while most other structures are in Newlin Township.

== History ==
The hamlet was founded between 1767 and 1772 by Thomas Hayes, who erected a grist mill and sawmill where the Strasburg Road crossed the creek, on the east bank. He sold his land and the mills to John Worth in 1772; John's son Thomas built a house on the north side of the road (across from the mills) in 1796.

Sketchley and Elizabeth Morton, a couple from Springfield Township, Delaware County, Pennsylvania, bought the former Worth property on April 1, 1840. (Morton, Pennsylvania was named after Sketchley.) The land was soon transferred to their grandson, Crosby P. Morton, who founded Mortonville. In 1849, he turned the Worth house into the Mortonville Hotel (although he was unable to obtain a tavern license for it, a necessity for serving alcohol) and built a wheelwright shop nearby, on the south side of the road. He leased the hotel to Isaac Parsons in 1850; Parsons obtained a tavern license, but vacated in 1851, leaving the hotel up for lease. It was described in his advertisement as serving both stock-drovers along the Strasburg Road and other travellers. Ultimately, it was rented to Hansen Thornbury. In the meantime, Morton erected a general store next to the wheelwright shop, but both the store and the mills were up for rent by the end of 1851, the tenants having vacated. On February 6, 1852, a post office was opened in Mortonville, with Morton as postmaster. He obtained Francis R. Hickman as a tenant for the store and wheelwright shop, but he went bankrupt in 1852, leaving them vacant again. In 1853, Robert Smith took over the hotel from Thornbury, but did not obtain a tavern license. In the middle of the year, Morton abruptly moved to Philadelphia, leaving the storekeeper, John C. Ely, to take over the postoffice. He and his wife Sarah sold all their holdings to Joshua N. Pierce, of Embreeville on March 31, 1854 and never returned to the town that bears their name.

The center of activity in the modern hamlet is a canoe rental business, based in an old house and the adjacent picnic park along the Brandywine. Other structures include the ruins of a grist mill, a new restaurant being built on an old foundation, canoe sheds, and an apparently modern covered bridge. The Mortonville Bridge, which was built in 1826 and rehabilitated in 2009, carries about 6,200 vehicles per day on Strasburg Road. It's unknown when the smaller bridge on the National Register was built, but it likely predates the larger bridge.

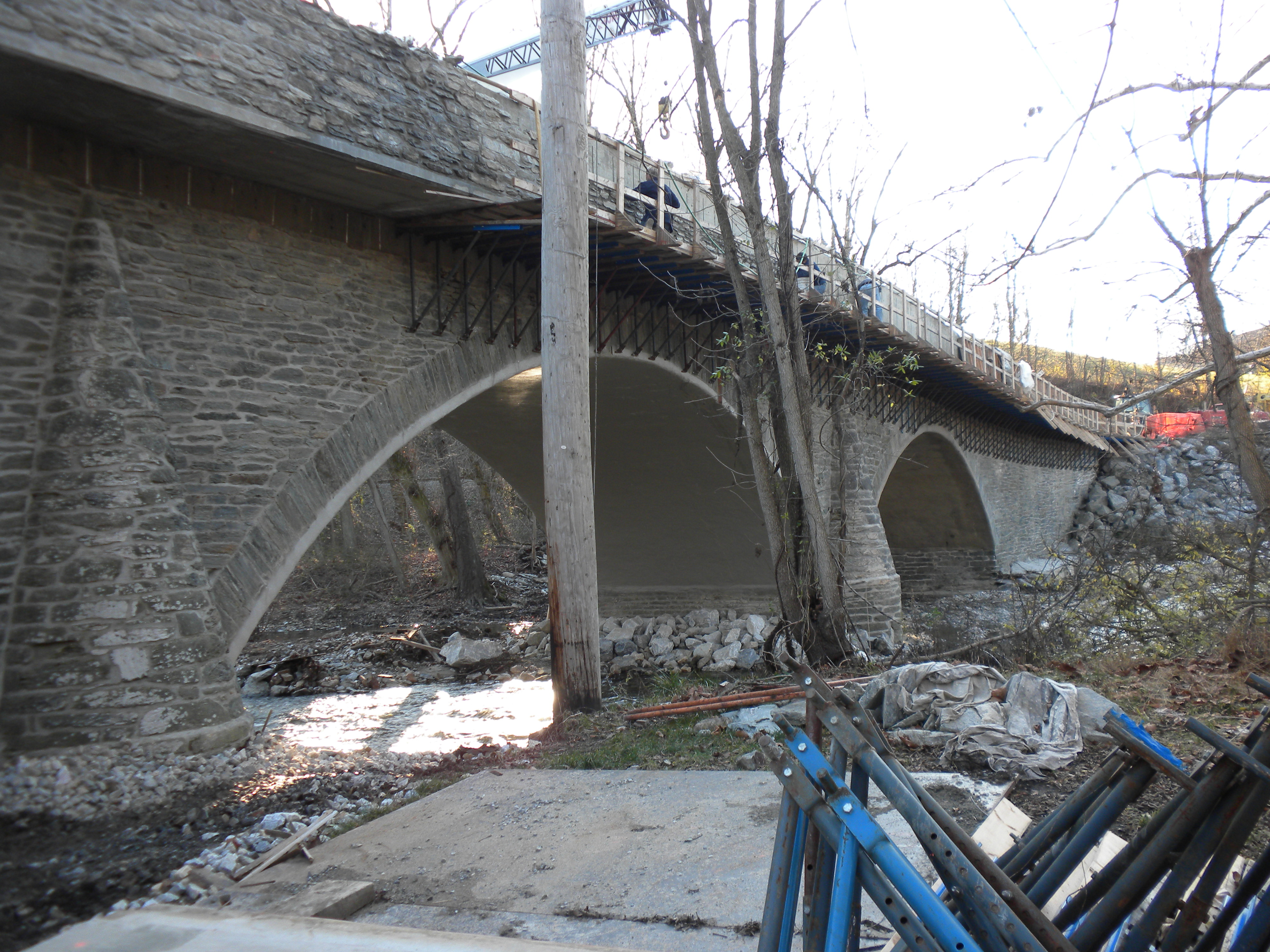
The Mortonville Bridge while under reconstruction

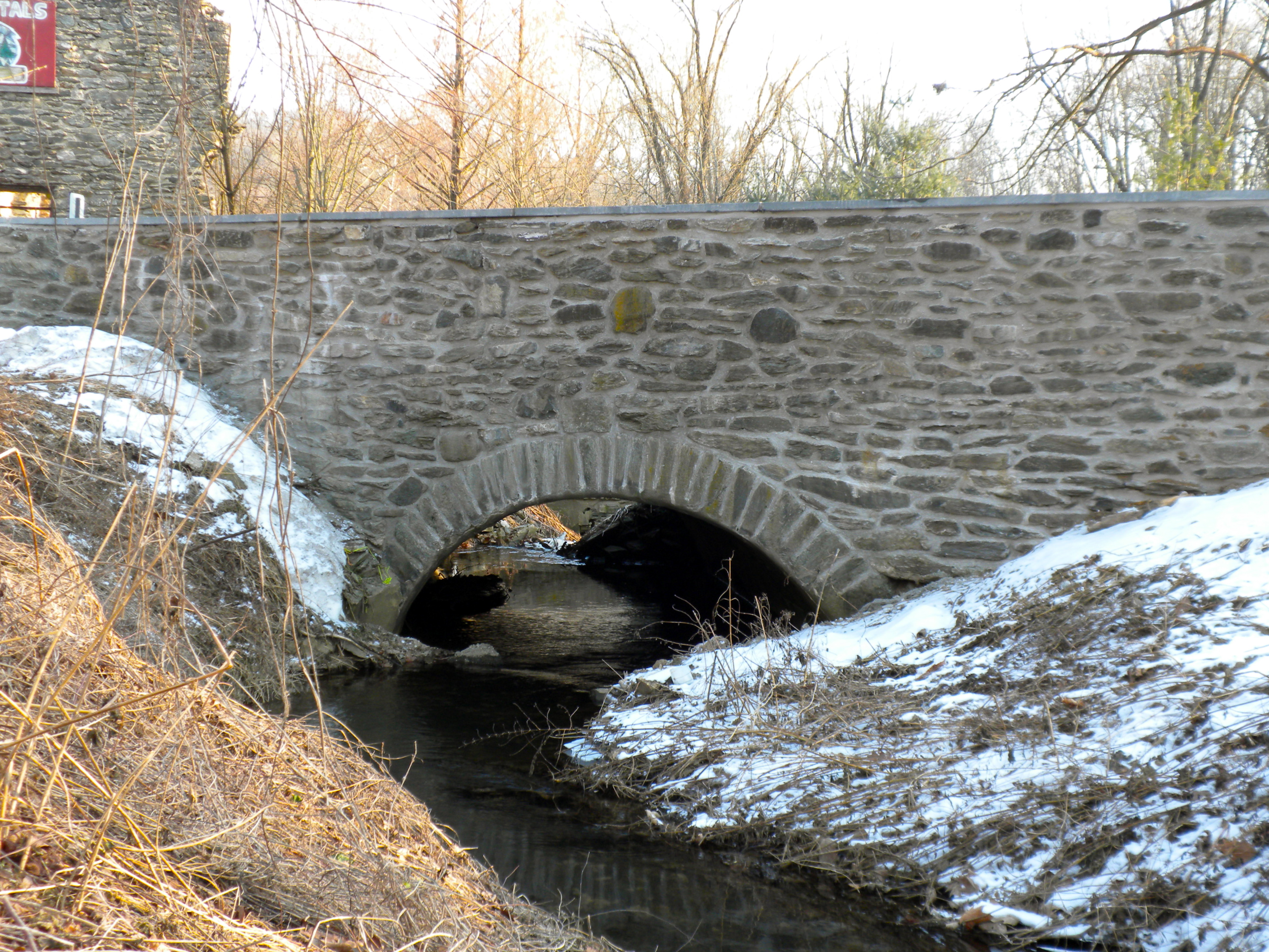
The 12.5-foot (3.8 m) "Bridge in East Fallowfield Township" 39°56′47″N 75°46′40″W
