= Pine Creek (Pennsylvania) =

Creek in Pennsylvania, United States

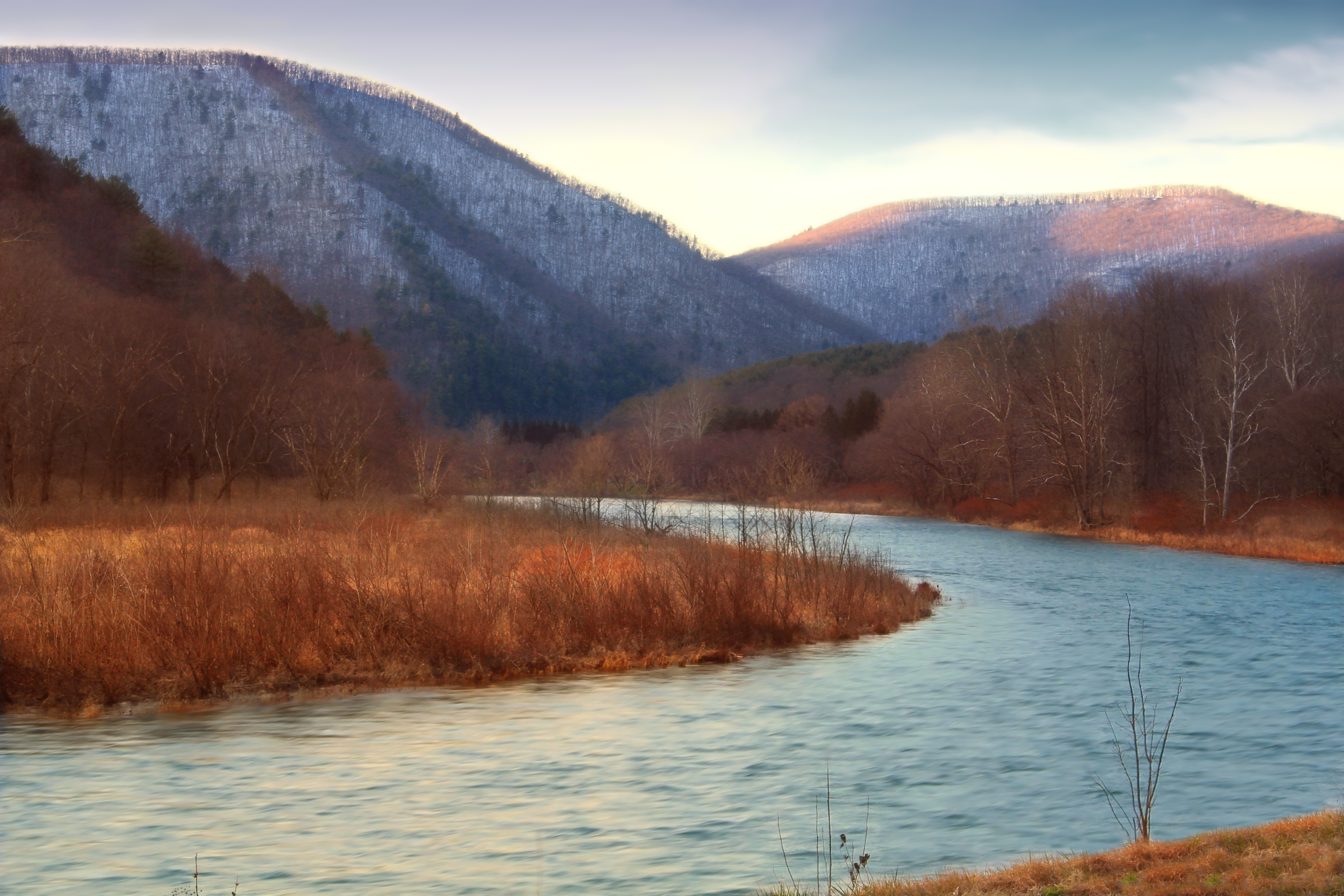
- Pine Creek from the Pine Creek Rail Trail in Lycoming County

Location
- Country: Potter, Tioga, Lycoming and Clinton counties in Pennsylvania, U.S.

Physical characteristics
- Source
  - location: Ulysses Township, Potter County
  - elevation: 2,420 feet (740 m)
- Mouth
  - location: West Branch Susquehanna River between the boroughs of Avis and Jersey Shore
  - coordinates: 41°10′16″N 77°16′09″W
- Length: 87.2 mi (140.3 km)
- Basin size: 979 mi^{2} (2,540 km^{2})

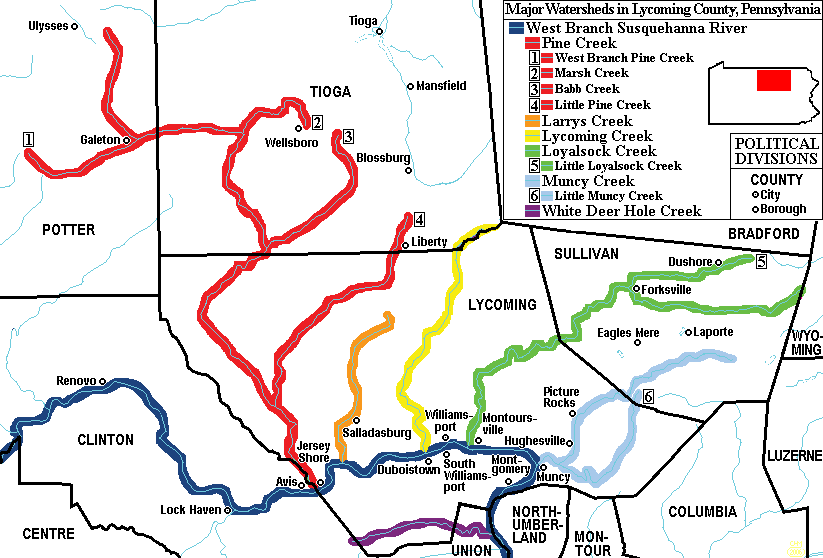
Map of the West Branch Susquehanna River (dark blue) and major streams in Lycoming County, Pennsylvania. Pine Creek (red) is the first major stream to enter the river in the county. Key to Pine Creek tributaries: 1 = West Branch Pine Creek; 2 = Marsh Creek; 3 = Babb Creek; 4 = Little Pine Creek / Blockhouse Creek

Pine Creek is a tributary of the West Branch Susquehanna River in Potter, Tioga, Lycoming, and Clinton counties in Pennsylvania. The creek is 87.2 miles (140.3 km) long. Within Tioga County, 23.25 miles (37.42 km) of Pine Creek are designated as a Pennsylvania Scenic River.

Pine Creek is the largest tributary of the West Branch Susquehanna River and has the largest watershed of all the West Branch’s tributaries.

== Name ==
Pine Creek is named for the many pine trees that lined (and now again line) much of its banks. The Iroquois called Pine Creek Tiadaghton, which according to Owlett, either meant "The River of Pines" or "The Lost or Bewildered River". Pine Creek is the largest "creek" in the United States.

== Geography ==
Pine Creek's source is in Potter County, 5 miles (8 km) southeast of Ulysses. It flows southeast 16 miles (26 km) to Galeton, where it receives its first major tributary, the West Branch Pine Creek. It then flows east 12 miles (19 km) to Tioga County and the village of Ansonia. Here it receives its second major tributary, Marsh Creek, and turns south again for 16 miles (26 km). This stretch is the start of the Pine Creek Gorge, which is about 1,000 feet (300 m) deep in places.

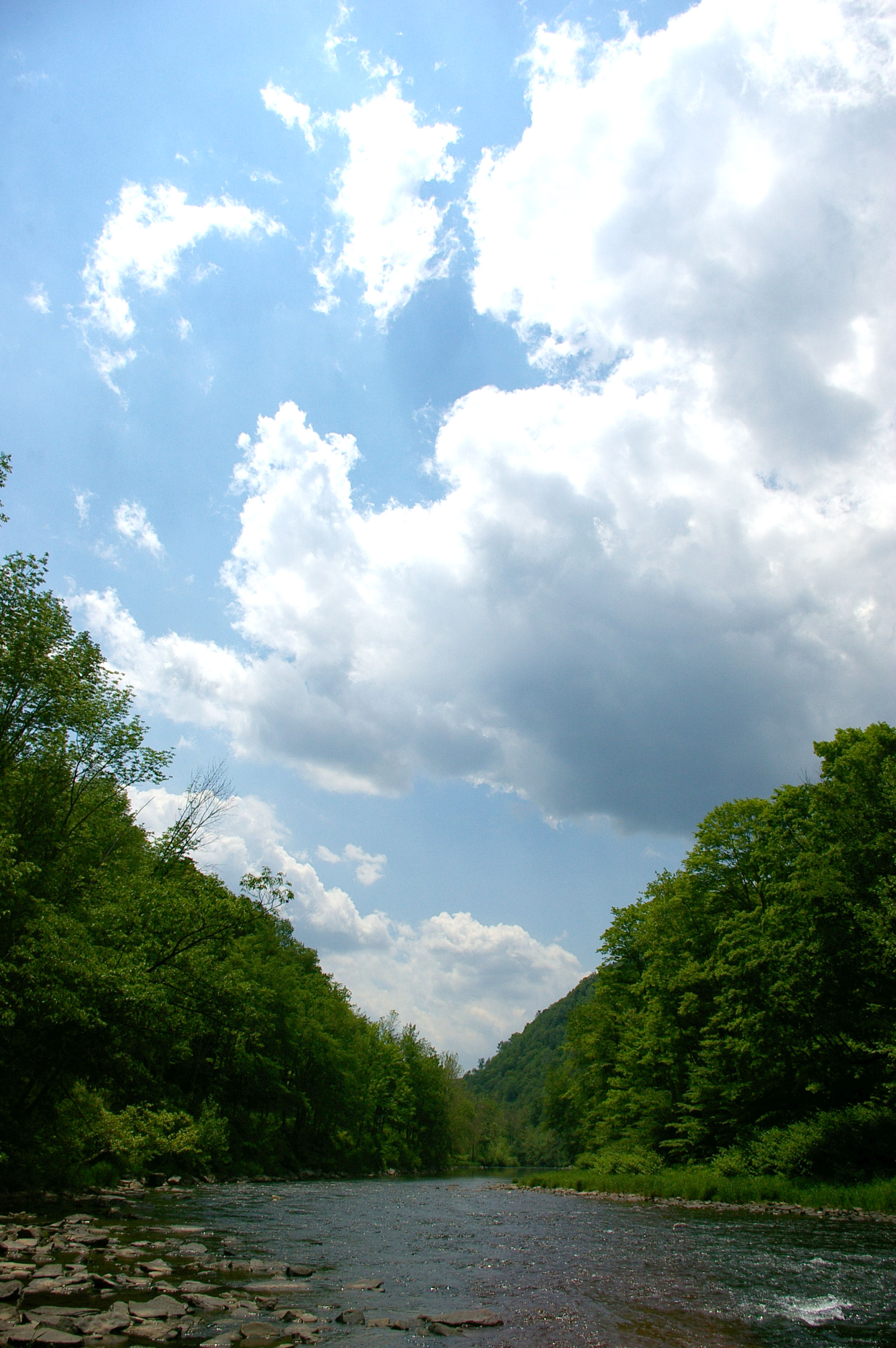
Pine Creek

At the village of Blackwell, Pine Creek receives its third major tributary, Babb Creek. It continues southwest 14 miles (23 km) and enters Lycoming County, where it turns southeast for 28 miles (45 km) to its mouth. At Waterville it receives its fourth major tributary, Little Pine Creek. Pine Creek continues south and forms part of the border between Lycoming and Clinton counties.

Its confluence with the West Branch Susquehanna River is at this border, between the boroughs of Avis (in Clinton County, to the west) and Jersey Shore (in Lycoming County, to the east).

The elevation at the source of Pine Creek is 2,420 feet (740 m), while the mouth is at an elevation of 520 feet (160 m). The difference in elevation—1,900 feet (580 m)—divided by the length of the creek—86.5 miles (139.2 km)—gives an average drop or relief ratio of 22.0 ft/mi (4.2 m/km ). The meander ratio is 1.08, so the creek is fairly straight in its bed.

== Watershed ==
Pine Creek's watershed covers 979 square miles (2,540 km^{2}), the largest watershed of all tributaries of the West Branch Susquehanna River.

=== Recreation ===
Pine Creek and Pine Creek Gorge (also known as the Grand Canyon of Pennsylvania) are a popular outdoor recreation destination. The West Rim Trail is a 30-mile-long (48 km) hiking trail along the west rim of the Pine Creek Gorge.

The Pine Creek Rail Trail runs beside the creek through the gorge from Ansonia to Jersey Shore. The railroad through the gorge opened in 1883 as the Jersey Shore, Pine Creek and Buffalo Railway, passing into the control of the Fall Brook Coal Company in 1884, and the New York Central Railroad via a lease in 1899, with full integration into the NYC in 1914. Conrail took over the line in 1976, and the last train ran through the gorge on October 7, 1988.

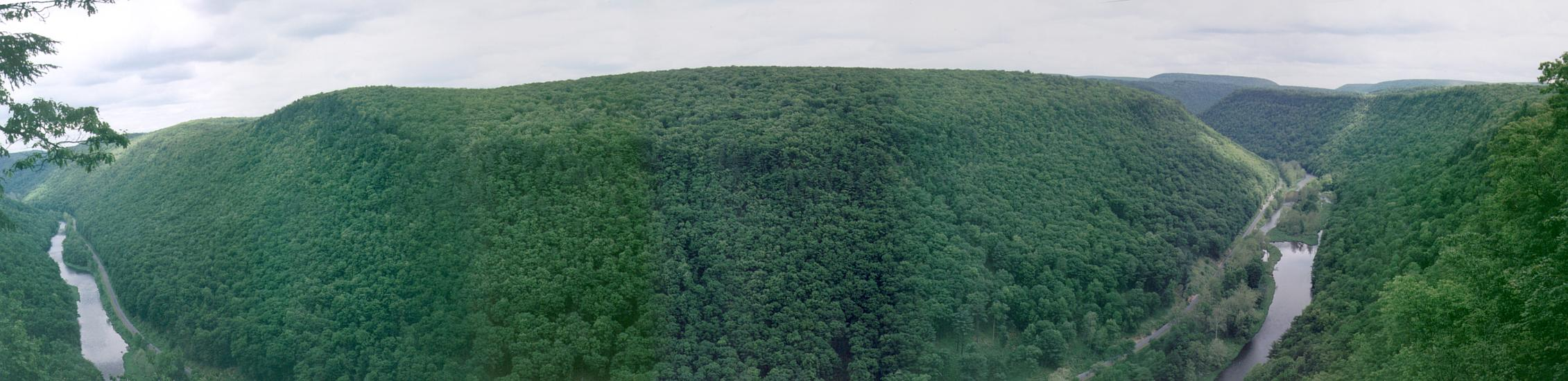
Panoramic view of the Pine Creek Gorge from Bradley Wales Picnic Area, south of Colton Point State Park.

== History ==
The Fair Play Men were illegal settlers (squatters) who established their own system of self-rule from 1773 to 1785 in the West Branch Susquehanna River valley of Pennsylvania in what is now the United States. Because they settled in territory claimed by Native Americans, they had no recourse to the Pennsylvania colonial government. Accordingly, they established what was known as the Fair Play System, with three elected commissioners who ruled on land claims and other issues for the group. In a remarkable coincidence, the Fair Play Men made their own declaration of independence from Britain on July 4, 1776, beneath the "Tiadaghton Elm" on the west bank of Pine Creek, very near the mouth.

== Bridges ==
- The Bridge in Porter Township was built in 1889.
- The Bridge in Brown Township was built in 1890.
- The English Center Suspension Bridge was built in 1891.

== See also ==
- List of rivers of Pennsylvania
