= National Register of Historic Places listings in Juniata County, Pennsylvania =

Location of Juniata County in Pennsylvania

This is a list of the National Register of Historic Places listings in Juniata County, Pennsylvania.

This is intended to be a complete list of the properties and districts on the National Register of Historic Places in Juniata County, Pennsylvania, United States. The locations of National Register properties and districts for which the latitude and longitude coordinates are included below, may be seen in a map.

There are 7 properties and districts listed on the National Register in the county.

This National Park Service list is complete through NPS recent listings posted September 26, 2025.

== Current listings ==
	Name on the Register	Image	Date listed	Location	City or town	Description
1	Academia Pomeroy Covered Bridge	Academia Pomeroy Covered Bridge	August 10, 1979 (#79002249)	Northwest of Spruce Hill; 40°29′37″N 77°28′21″W	Beale and Spruce Hill Townships	
2	Book Site (36 Jul)	Book Site (36 Jul)	January 3, 1986 (#86000067)	Off Legislative Route 3019; 40°28′44″N 77°30′02″W	Beale Township	
3	Dimmsville Covered Bridge	Dimmsville Covered Bridge	August 10, 1979 (#79002245)	West of Dimmsville; 40°36′23″N 77°08′20″W	Greenwood Township	
4	East Oriental Covered Bridge	East Oriental Covered Bridge	August 10, 1979 (#79002246)	Northeast of Oriental; 40°38′20″N 77°00′05″W	Susquehanna Township	Extends into Perry Township in Snyder County
5	Lehman's, Port Royal Covered Bridge	Lehman's, Port Royal Covered Bridge	August 10, 1979 (#79002248)	Southwest of Port Royal; 40°31′45″N 77°23′45″W	Turbett Township	
6	North Oriental Covered Bridge	North Oriental Covered Bridge	August 10, 1979 (#79002247)	Northeast of Oriental; 40°39′42″N 77°00′41″W	Susquehanna Township	Extends into Perry Township in Snyder County
7	Tuscarora Academy	Tuscarora Academy	June 30, 1972 (#72001125)	8 miles (13 km) south of Mifflintown at junction of Pennsylvania Routes 34005 and 34028; 40°29′51″N 77°29′18″W	Beale Township	

== See also ==
- List of National Historic Landmarks in Pennsylvania
- National Register of Historic Places listings in Pennsylvania
- List of Pennsylvania state historical markers in Juniata County
