= National Register of Historic Places listings in Snyder County, Pennsylvania =

Location of Snyder County in Pennsylvania

This is a list of the National Register of Historic Places listings in Snyder County, Pennsylvania.

This is intended to be a complete list of the properties and districts on the National Register of Historic Places in Snyder County, Pennsylvania, United States. The locations of National Register properties and districts for which the latitude and longitude coordinates are included below, may be seen in a map.

There are 8 properties and districts listed on the National Register in the county. Two sites are further designated as National Historic Landmarks and another is designated as a National Historic Site.

This National Park Service list is complete through NPS recent listings posted January 23, 2026.

== Current listings ==
	Name on the Register	Image	Date listed	Location	City or town	Description
1	Aline Covered Bridge	Aline Covered Bridge	August 10, 1979 (#79002344)	Northwest of Meiserville; 40°40′35″N 76°58′46″W	Perry Township	
2	Bridge between Monroe and Penn Townships	Bridge between Monroe and Penn Townships	June 22, 1988 (#88000811)	Legislative Route 54013 over Penns Creek; 40°49′32″N 76°52′17″W	Monroe and Penn Townships	Demolished and replaced with new bridge
3	Dreese's Covered Bridge	Dreese's Covered Bridge	August 10, 1979 (#79002343)	Spans Middle Creek; 40°46′31″N 77°08′42″W	Beaver Township	
4	East Oriental Covered Bridge	East Oriental Covered Bridge	August 10, 1979 (#79002246)	Northeast of Oriental; 40°38′20″N 77°00′05″W	Perry Township	Extends into Susquehanna Township in Juniata County
5	Gross Bridge	Gross Bridge	August 29, 1977 (#77001194)	Township Route 427 in Beaver Springs; 40°45′06″N 77°13′24″W	Spring Township	
6	North Oriental Covered Bridge	North Oriental Covered Bridge	August 10, 1979 (#79002247)	Northeast of Oriental; 40°39′42″N 77°00′41″W	Perry Township	Extends into Susquehanna Township in Juniata County
7	Selinsgrove Hall and Seibert Hall	Selinsgrove Hall and Seibert Hall	October 25, 1979 (#79002345)	Pine Street; 40°47′56″N 76°52′19″W	Selinsgrove	
8	Gov. Simon Snyder Mansion	Gov. Simon Snyder Mansion	August 25, 1978 (#78002470)	119–121 North Market Street; 40°48′02″N 76°51′43″W	Selinsgrove	

== See also ==
- List of Pennsylvania state historical markers in Snyder County
