= List of Pennsylvania state historical markers in Bucks County =

Location of Bucks County in Pennsylvania

This is a list of the Pennsylvania state historical markers in Bucks County.

This is intended to be a complete list of the official state historical markers placed in Bucks County, Pennsylvania by the Pennsylvania Historical and Museum Commission (PHMC). The locations of the historical markers, as well as the latitude and longitude coordinates as provided by the PHMC's database, are included below when available. There are 79 historical markers located in Bucks County.

== Historical markers ==
| Marker title | Image | Date dedicated | Location | Marker type | Topics |
| Aaron Siskind (1903-1991) | | October 29, 2004 | 28 E. Swamp Rd. (Pa. 313) east of Pa. 611, Doylestown (Cross Keys); 40.327°N 75.12755°W | Roadside | Artists, Professions & Vocations |
| Abraham Lincoln | | 1991 | Near intersection of Bristol Pike & Pond St., Bristol | City | Abraham Lincoln, Government & Politics, Government & Politics 19th Century |
| Andalusia | | November 1, 2001 | 1237 State Road, Andalusia (Bensalem Township); 40.0656°N 74.9618°W | Roadside | Agriculture, Buildings, Business & Industry, Government & Politics, Government & Politics 19th Century, Professions & Vocations, Writers |
| Bogart's Tavern | | June 28, 2003 | Route 263 and Route 413, Buckingham; 40.32357°N 75.06042°W | City | American Revolution, Government & Politics, Military, Inns & Taverns |
| Bristol | | n/a | Old U.S. 13 SR 2002 (Missing) | Roadside | Cities & Towns, Early Settlement, Government & Politics |
| Bristol | | n/a | Old U.S. 13 SR 2002 (Missing) | Roadside | Cities & Towns, Early Settlement, Government & Politics |
| Bristol | | January 13, 1949 | Old US 13 at Otter Rd., S of Bristol; 40.09717°N 74.87041°W | Roadside | Cities & Towns, Early Settlement, Government & Politics 17th Century, Transportation |
| Bristol | | n/a | Old U.S. 13 N of Bristol (Missing) | Roadside | Cities & Towns |
| Buckingham Meeting House | | March 26, 1947 | U.S. 202 NE of Buckingham (Missing) | Roadside | American Revolution, Buildings, Houses & Homesteads, Military, Religion |
| Bucks County | | October 29, 1982 | Courthouse, E. Court St., Doylestown; 40.31203°N 75.12965°W | City | Government & Politics, Government & Politics 17th Century, William Penn |
| Casimir Sienkiewicz (1890-1974) | | October 20, 2006 | 202 E. Court St., Doylestown; 40.31442°N 75.12687°W | Roadside | Artists, Business & Industry, Ethnic & Immigration |
| Charles Sheeler | | May 29, 1999 | 39 Mercer Ave. at Center St., Doylestown; 40.32555°N 75.12733°W | City | Artists |
| Delaware Canal | | January 18, 1949 | Pa. 32 near marker 894 (Missing) | Roadside | Canals, Navigation, Transportation |
| Delaware Canal | | January 18, 1949 | U.S. 13 at Bristol, South Side (Missing) | Roadside | Canals, Navigation, Transportation |
| Delaware Canal | | January 18, 1949 | U.S. 13 at Bristol, North Side (Missing) | Roadside | Canals, Navigation, Transportation |
| Delaware Canal | | January 24, 1949 | Pa. 611 at Durham Furnace | Roadside | Canals, Navigation, Transportation |
| Delaware Canal | | January 21, 1949 | near covered bridge on Uhlerstown Hill Road, ~ 1/4 mile west of Pa. 32 at Uhlerstown | Roadside | Canals, Navigation, Transportation |
| Delaware Canal | | January 21, 1949 | Pa. 32 at Tinicum (Missing) | Roadside | Canals, Navigation, Transportation |
| Delaware Canal | | January 20, 1949 | Pa. 32, just S of Pa. 232 at New Hope | Roadside | Canals, Navigation, Transportation |
| Delaware Canal | | January 20, 1949 | Pa. 32 at Lumberville | Roadside | Canals, Navigation, Transportation |
| Delaware Canal | | January 18, 1949 | Pa. 32, 2.3 miles N of Washington Crossing at Jericho Creek (Missing) | Roadside | Canals, Navigation, Transportation |
| Delaware Canal | | January 10, 1949 | Pa. 32, 50 ft. N of Pa. 232 at New Hope; 40.3584°N 74.9492°W | Roadside | Canals, Navigation, Transportation |
| Doan Gang (The) | | November 5, 2005 | 4914A Point Pleasant Pike, Gardenville, @ Friends Mtg. House; 40.36743°N 75.11468°W | Roadside | American Revolution, Government & Politics 18th Century |
| Doylestown Agricultural Works | | October 23, 2003 | Ashland St. near Main, Doylestown; 40.3074°N 75.1301°W | Roadside | Agriculture, Business & Industry, Iron |
| Durham Furnace | | November 21, 1947 | Pa. 212 at Durham; 40.57397°N 75.2247°W | Roadside | American Revolution, Business & Industry, Furnaces, Military |
| Durham Road Milestone | | October 28, 1988 | Pa. 413, 1 mile S of Newtown; 40.21408°N 74.93125°W | Roadside | Roads, Transportation |
| Edward Hicks | | September 6, 1997 | 122 Penn St., Newtown; 40.22642°N 74.9348°W | City | Artists |
| Famous Indian Walk (The) - PLAQUE | | October 23, 1925 | PA 412, ~ a mile SW of Springtown (plaque missing) | Plaque | Government & Politics 18th Century, Native American, William Penn |
| First Weather Satellite, The | | September 20, 2001 | State & Sterling Streets, Newtown; 40.22403°N 74.93602°W | City | Business & Industry, Environment, Invention |
| Fries Rebellion of 1799, The | | May 16, 2003 | Main & Broad Sts., Quakertown; 40.40237°N 75.35245°W | City | Agriculture, Ethnic & Immigration, Government & Politics, Government & Politics 18th Century, Military |
| Gallows Hill - PLAQUE | | November 1, 1925 | Intersection PA 412 & SR 4075 (Gallows Hill Rd.), Stony Point; 40.53117°N 75.22283°W | Plaque | Native American, Paths & Trails |
| Henry Chapman Mercer | | October 17, 1998 | Pa. 313 in front of Tile Works, Doylestown; 40.32378°N 75.12208°W | Roadside | Artists, Buildings, Business & Industry, Invention, Professions & Vocations |
| Historic Fallsington | | June 3, 1961 | SR 2020 (Tyburn Rd.) at SR 2026 (New Falls Road), Fallingston (Missing) | Roadside | Buildings, Cities & Towns, Early Settlement, Government & Politics, Government & Politics 17th Century, Religion, William Penn |
| Historic Fallsington | | June 3, 1961 | U.S. 1 at intersection LR 09136, south side of highway (Missing) | Roadside | Early Settlement, Government & Politics, Government & Politics 17th Century, Religion, William Penn |
| Historic Fallsington | | June 3, 1961 | Business US 1 at SR 2020 (Tyburn Rd.) | Roadside | Early Settlement, Government & Politics, Government & Politics 17th Century, Religion, William Penn |
| Honey Hollow Watershed | | September 20, 1997 | Rte. 232, Solebury Twp. | Roadside | Agriculture, Environment |
| James A. Michener | | October 29, 1999 | East Court St. near Broad St., Doylestown; 40.31242°N 75.12893°W | Roadside | Writers |
| John Fitch's Steamboat | | October 23, 1947 | Jct. Pa. 132 & 263, Warminster; 40.2068°N 75.0995°W | Roadside | Business & Industry, Invention, Professions & Vocations, Transportation |
| Johnsville Naval Air Development Center | | November 11, 1998 | E Street Rd., 200 yds. N of Newton Rd., Warminster; 40.19295°N 75.07532°W | Roadside | Business & Industry, Military, Military Post-Civil War |
| Joseph Ridgway Grundy (1863-1961) | | October 18, 2008 | 610-680 Radcliffe St., Bristol; 40.0977°N 74.8504°W | Roadside | Business & Industry, Government & Politics 20th Century, Publishing |
| Katharine Drexel (1858-1955) | | October 2, 2004 | 1663 Bristol Pike, Bensalem; 40.0731°N 74.9577°W | Roadside | African American, Education, Native American, Religion, Women |
| Langhorne Speedway | | October 14, 2006 | 1939 E Lincoln Hwy., Langhorne; 40.17597°N 74.8858°W | Roadside | Sports |
| Levittown | | November 28, 1992 | Levittown Parkway at U.S. 13, Levittown; 40.1414°N 74.8183°W | Roadside | Buildings, Business & Industry, Cities & Towns |
| Log College | | October 26, 2008 | Between 800 and 886 N York Rd. (PA 263), near Tennyson Dr., across from Log College Manor, Warminster; 40.21481°N 75.09941°W | Roadside | Early Settlement, Education, Religion |
| Loyalist Raid of 1778 | | September 20, 2001 | State & Mercer Streets, Newtown; 40.22737°N 74.93688°W | City | American Revolution, Military, Inns & Taverns |
| Margaret Mead | | June 22, 1996 | 225 W. Court St., Doylestown; 40.30682°N 75.13513°W | City | Medicine & Science, Women, Writers |
| Martin Johnson Heade (1819-1904) | | October 14, 2000 | Rte. 32, Lumberville, in front of Lumberville General store 40.40653°N 75.03715°W | City | Artists |
| Moland House | | October 21, 1947 | 1641 Old York Rd., Hartsville; 40.2486°N 75.0927°W | Roadside | American Revolution, George Washington, Military |
| Mollie Woods Hare (1881-1956) | | April 13, 2010 | At entrance to Woods Services, between 321 and 335 S Bellevue Ave., Langhorne; 40.1731°N 74.9188°W | Roadside | Education, Medicine & Science, Women |
| Oscar Hammerstein II | | July 18, 1994 | E State St. (Bus. 202) at East Rd., Doylestown; 40.31273°N 75.11408°W | Roadside | Music & Theater |
| Pearl S. Buck | | June 25, 1995 | Green Hills Farm, 520 Dublin Road, Perkasie | Roadside | Women, Writers |
| Pennsbury | | 1948 | At site, E of Tullytown | Roadside | Government & Politics, Government & Politics 17th Century, William Penn |
| Pennsbury Manor | | October 8, 1951 | SR 2020 (Tyburn Rd.) S of Fallsington; SR 2059 (New Ford Rd.) at SR 2020 | Roadside | Government & Politics, Government & Politics 17th Century, William Penn |
| Pennsbury Manor | | November 11, 1949 | SR 2055 (old U.S. 13) Tullytown, near junction SR 2059; 40.1427°N 74.8112°W | Roadside | Government & Politics, Government & Politics 17th Century, William Penn |
| Pennsylvania | | November 11, 1949 | PA 413, .4 miles west of bridge at state line, Bristol; 40.08501°N 74.87121°W | Roadside | Government & Politics, Government & Politics 17th Century, William Penn |
| Pennsylvania | | November 11, 1949 | U.S. 1, approx. 300 yards west of Delaware River Bridge (MISSING) | Roadside | Government & Politics, Government & Politics 17th Century, William Penn |
| Pennsylvania | | November 11, 1949 | Bridge St. (Old US 1 / Rt. 32), at Central Ave., 1 block from Delaware River, Morrisville; 40.2101°N 74.77171°W | Roadside | Government & Politics, Government & Politics 17th Century, William Penn |
| Pennsylvania Canal | | January 10, 1949 | Pa. 32, 3.5 miles N of New Hope | Roadside | Canals, Navigation, Transportation |
| Pennsylvania Canal | | January 7, 1949 | Pa. 611 at Durham Furnace (MISSING) | Roadside | Canals, Navigation, Transportation |
| Pennsylvania Canal | | January 10, 1949 | River Rd. (PA 32) at Old Carversville Rd., Lumberville; 40.4073°N 75.03867°W | Roadside | Canals, Navigation, Transportation |
| Pennsylvania Canal | | December 14, 1948 | Pa. 532 W of Washington Crossing (MISSING) | Roadside | Canals, Navigation, Transportation |
| Playwicky Indian Town, 1682 - PLAQUE | | October 1925 | PA 213 (Bridgetown Pike), .5 mile from Neshaminy Creek & 2.5 miles W of Langhorne | Plaque | Early Settlement, Government & Politics 17th Century, Native American, William Penn |
| Revolutionary War Burial Site | | November 11, 1999 | Intersection of Bellevue & Flowers Ave., Langhorne Borough; 40.1739°N 74.91922°W | Roadside | American Revolution, George Washington, Military |
| Richard Moore | | September 14, 2019 | 401 South Main Street, Quakertown | City | African American, Houses & Homesteads, Religion, Underground Railroad |
| Richboro Nike Missile Battery PH-07 | | October 5, 2007 | Northampton Twp. Rec. Ctr., Rt. 332, Richboro | Roadside | Government & Politics 20th Century, Military, Military Post-Civil War |
| Rochambeau Route | | October 18, 1954 | Bristol Pike (Rt. 13) & Mill Rd., Bensalem; 40.0651°N 74.9805°W | Roadside | American Revolution, George Washington, Military, Transportation |
| Samuel D. Ingham | | October 21, 1947 | U.S. 202, 1.5 miles W of New Hope | Roadside | Business & Industry, Canals, Coal, Government & Politics, Government & Politics 18th Century, Professions & Vocations |
| Summerseat | | January 27, 1949 | At site, Legion Ave., near Hillcrest Ave., Morrisville | Roadside | American Revolution, George Washington, Military |
| Treasure Island Reservation | | June 25, 1989 | Pa. 32, 3.5 miles N of Point Pleasant; 40.47102°N 75.06973°W | Roadside | Education, Native American, Sports |
| Trevose | | October 29, 1946 | U.S. 1, 3.5 miles W of S. Langhorne (Missing) | City | Government & Politics, Government & Politics 17th Century, William Penn |
| W. Atlee Burpee | | October 4, 2000 | Burpee Park, Church St. near E Oakland Ave. (Rt. 202), Doylestown; 40.31088°N 75.12505°W | City | Agriculture, Business & Industry, Entrepreneurs, Invention |
| W.W.H. Davis | | October 19, 2001 | 60 E. Court Street, Doylestown; 40.31207°N 75.12928°W | City | Civil War, Government & Politics, Government & Politics 19th Century, Military, Professions & Vocations, Writers |
| Walking Purchase | | January 7, 1949 | PA 412 off PA 212, near Moyer Rd., ~1.5 mi. SW of Springtown; 40.54597°N 75.30358°W | Roadside | Early Settlement, Government & Politics 18th Century, Native American, William Penn |
| Walking Purchase | | January 4, 1949 | Pa. 611 at Ottsville | Roadside | Early Settlement, Government & Politics 18th Century, Native American, William Penn |
| Walking Purchase | | January 10, 1949 | Pa. 413 at Penn Park Rd., near Wrightstown (in yard of Friends Mtg. House beside 10' tall brown stone) | Roadside | Government & Politics, Government & Politics 17th Century, Native American |
| Walking Purchase | | January 7, 1949 | PA 413 at Wrightstown (Missing) | Roadside | Government & Politics, Government & Politics 18th Century, Native American |
| Walking Purchase | | January 4, 1949 | Pa. 611, .5 mile N of Ottsville (Missing) | Roadside | Government & Politics, Government & Politics 18th Century, Native American |
| Walking Purchase | | January 7, 1949 | PA 412, SW of Springtown | Roadside | Government & Politics 18th Century, Native American, William Penn |
| Washington Crossing | | November 17, 1947 | Pa. 532 at Washington Crossing | Roadside | American Revolution, George Washington, Military |
| William Penn's First Walking Purchase | | October 13, 2001 | Jericho Creek @ intersection of River & Taylorsville Rds., Washington Crossing | Roadside | Early Settlement, Government & Politics, Native American, Paths & Trails, Transportation, William Penn |

== See also ==
- List of Pennsylvania state historical markers
- National Register of Historic Places listings in Bucks County, Pennsylvania
