= List of Pennsylvania state historical markers in Snyder County =

Location of Snyder County in Pennsylvania

This is a list of the Pennsylvania state historical markers in Snyder County.

This is intended to be a complete list of the official state historical markers placed in Snyder County, Pennsylvania by the Pennsylvania Historical and Museum Commission (PHMC). The locations of the historical markers, as well as the latitude and longitude coordinates as provided by the PHMC's database, are included below when available. There are 15 historical markers located in Snyder County.

== Historical markers ==
Marker title	Image	Date dedicated	Location	Marker type	Topics
Albany Purchase		September 30, 1947	US 522/US 11 & 15, 1 mile N of Selinsgrove; 40.82397°N 76.84705°W	Roadside	Government & Politics, Government & Politics 18th Century
Coxey's Army		September 9, 1966	814 N. Market St. (old U.S. 11 & 15), Selinsgrove; 40.8088°N 76.85703°W	Roadside	George Washington, Military, Military Post-Civil War
Fort Augusta		March 14, 1947	U.S. 11, 5.9 miles NW of Selinsgrove near Northumberland Bridge (Missing)	Roadside	Forts, French & Indian War, Military
Harris Ambush - PLAQUE		October 1915	At the Old Bridge, 1/2 mile W of Selinsgrove	Plaque	Early Settlement, French & Indian War, Native American, Navigation
Lock Number Seven		July 11, 1946	U.S. 15 & 11 at Mahantango Creek (Missing)	Roadside	Canals, Navigation, Transportation
Penn's Creek Massacre		September 30, 1947	SR 2017 (old U.S. 11 & 15) just N of Selinsgrove	Roadside	Early Settlement, Native American
Penns Creek Massacre - PLAQUE		October 1915	S end of Old Trail (just E of US 11 & 15) Penns Creek N of Selinsgrove	Plaque	French & Indian War, Native American
Pennsylvania Canal (Susquehanna Division)		June 6, 1952	U.S. 11 & 15 at Port Trevorton	Roadside	Canals, Navigation, Transportation
Schoch Blockhouse		September 30, 1947	US 522 near RR crossing, at village of Kreamer; 40.80378°N 76.97012°W	Roadside	American Revolution, Military
Shikellamy		November 30, 1947	U.S. 11, 5.4 miles N of Selinsgrove entrance to Shikellamy State Park	Roadside	Early Settlement, Native American
Simon Snyder		September 30, 1947	121 N Marker St., Selinsgrove	City	Ethnic & Immigration, Government & Politics, Government & Politics 19th Century, Governors
Simon Snyder Mansion - PLAQUE		May 1918	121 N. Market St. (old US 11 & 15), Selinsgrove	Plaque	Government & Politics 19th Century, Governors, Houses & Homesteads
Snyder County		December 1, 1982	County courthouse, 9 W. Market St. (US 522), Middleburg; 40.79193°N 77.04648°W	City	Government & Politics, Government & Politics 19th Century, Governors
Sunbury		September 15, 1948	U.S. 11 & 15, 4 miles N of Selinsgrove	Roadside	French & Indian War, Government & Politics, Government & Politics 18th Century, Military
Susquehanna University		June 17, 1948	University Ave. near 18th St., Selinsgrove; 40.79927°N 76.8732°W	Roadside	Education, Religion

== See also ==
- List of Pennsylvania state historical markers
- National Register of Historic Places listings in Snyder County, Pennsylvania
