= List of Pennsylvania state historical markers in Juniata County =

Location of Juniata County in Pennsylvania

This is a list of the Pennsylvania state historical markers in Juniata County.

This is intended to be a complete list of the official state historical markers placed in Juniata County, Pennsylvania by the Pennsylvania Historical and Museum Commission (PHMC). The locations of the historical markers, as well as the latitude and longitude coordinates as provided by the PHMC's database, are included below when available. There are five historical markers located in Juniata County.

== Historical markers ==
Marker title	Image	Date dedicated	Location	Marker type	Topics
Fort Bigham		April 1, 1947	SR 3001 (old U.S. 22 & 322), .8 mile NW of Mexico; 40.5467°N 77.36633°W	Roadside	Forts, French & Indian War, Military, Native American
Juniata County		June 27, 1982	County Courthouse, Mifflintown; 40.5702°N 77.56293°W	City	Government & Politics, Government & Politics 19th Century, Transportation
Patterson's Fort		April 1, 1947	Wm. Penn Hwy. (SR 3001 / old US 22/322), near Gill Rd. (Rt. 382), .1 mile E of Mexico; 40.5359°N 77.35072°W	Roadside	French & Indian War, Military, Native American
Tuscarora Academy		March 20, 1968	At site, SR 3017 (former LR 34005), Academia	Roadside	Education, Religion
Tuscarora Path		April 1, 1947	Wm. Penn Hwy. (SR 3002 / old US 22/322) near Henry Crossroad Rd. (PA 75), .9 mile NW of Mexico; 40.54757°N 77.36793°W	Roadside	Native American, Paths & Trails, Transportation

== See also ==
- List of Pennsylvania state historical markers
- National Register of Historic Places listings in Juniata County, Pennsylvania
