= Bridge between Monroe and Penn Townships =

- U.S. National Register of Historic Places
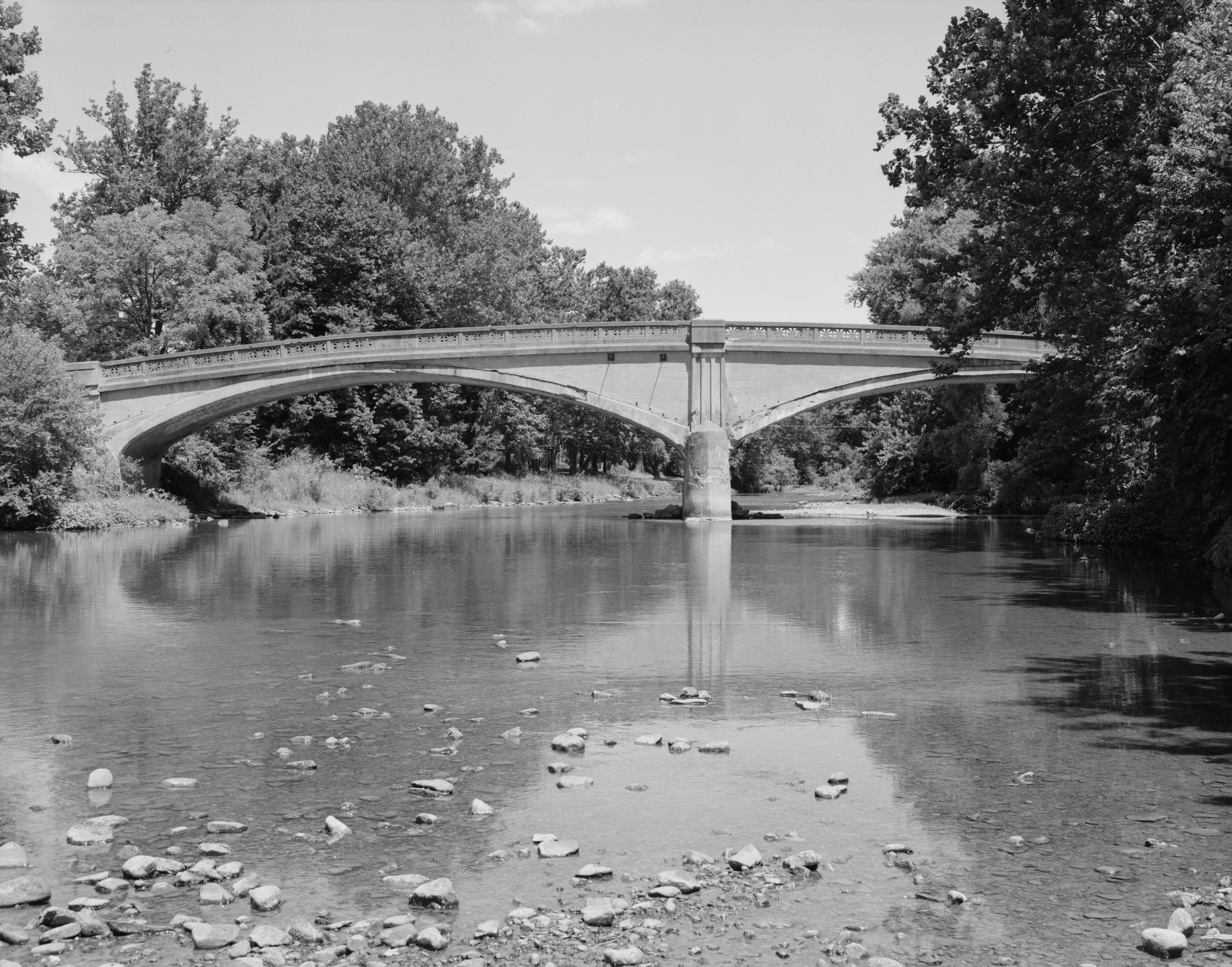
- Southern side of the original bridge

- Location within Pennsylvania Location within the United States
- Nearest city: Selinsgrove, Pennsylvania
- Coordinates: 40°49′31″N 76°52′22″W
- Area: less than one acre
- Built: 1919
- Architect: Flink, G. A.; Whittaker & Diehl
- Architectural style: Multi-span barrel arch
- MPS: Highway Bridges Owned by the Commonwealth of Pennsylvania, Department of Transportation TR
- NRHP reference No.: 88000811
- Added to NRHP: June 22, 1988

The Bridge between Monroe and Penn Townships, also known as the Penns Creek Bridge, Camelback Bridge, or Camelback, was a historic bridge located at Monroe Township and Penn Township near Selinsgrove in Snyder County, Pennsylvania. It was a 194-foot-long (59 m) barrel arch bridge built in 1919. It spanned Penns Creek. It was removed in 1994.

It was listed on the National Register of Historic Places in 1988.

== Gallery ==
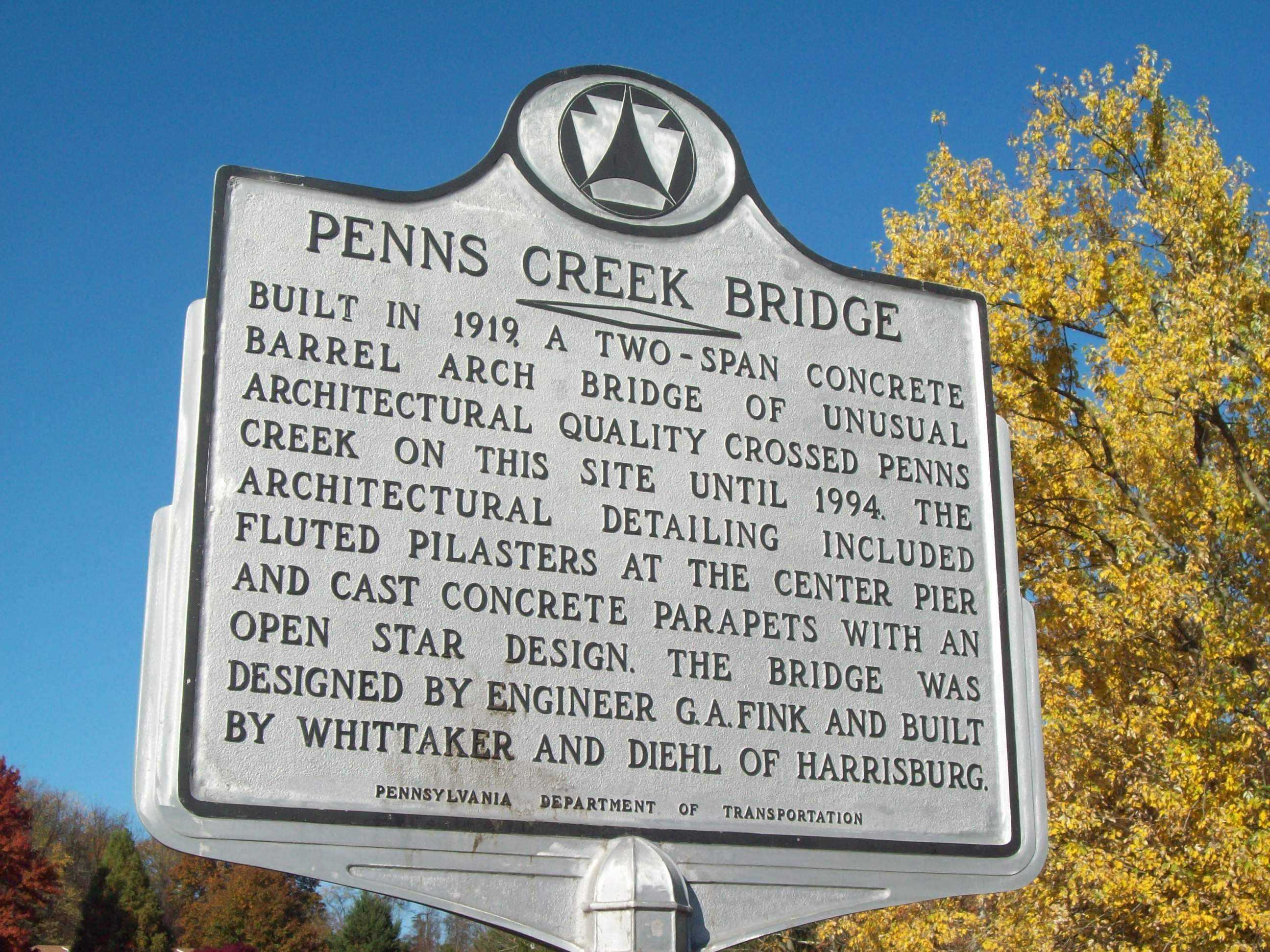
Bridge between Monroe and Penn Townships, Historic Marker, October 2009

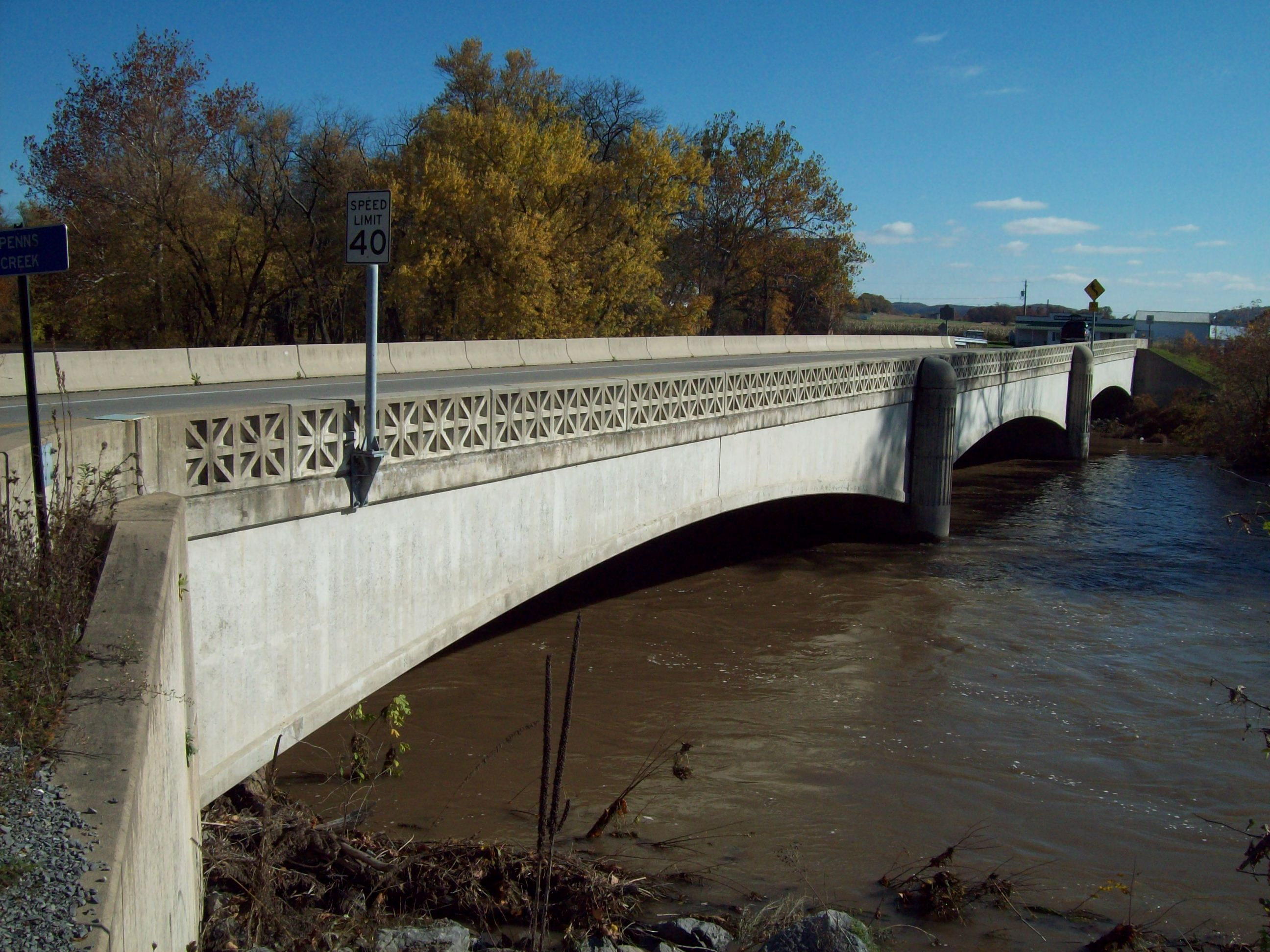
Replacement for Bridge between Monroe and Penn Townships, October 2009

== See also ==
- List of bridges documented by the Historic American Engineering Record in Pennsylvania
- National Register of Historic Places listings in Snyder County, Pennsylvania
