= Allegheny Textile Strikes of 1845 and 1848 =

Factory Town

Allegheny Textile Strike of 1845
- Location: Pittsburgh, United States
- Result: An initial concession to institute a ten-hour workday. The abolition of child labor in the factories. The subsequent defeat of strikers, a major setback to the unionization of the women working in the cotton mills in Pittsburgh; subsequent strike breaking activities

Parties
The female employees of the cotton mill	cotton mill owners and management

Pennsylvania Historical Marker
- Official name: Cotton Mill Women Strikes
- Designated: July 1, 1992

Pennsylvania Historical Marker
- Designated

Pittsburgh Landmark – PHLF
- Designated

The Allegheny Textile Strikes of 1845 and 1848 occurred in Allegheny, Pennsylvania, which was a factory town during the 1840s. Workers were often denouncing their working conditions and the fight for a ten hour day was prominent here. The 1848 strike was a response to lightened laws following the 1845 strike despite agreements made in 1845. Both were led by women and children because they made up the majority of the textile workforce.

== Background ==
The Allegheny Textile Strike of 1845 began on September 15 at the Market House, in what is now known as the North Side in Pittsburgh, Pennsylvania. More than 400 textile workers awaited an update on their push for a ten hour day, as opposed to 12, without a pay cut. The strike began over textile workers, primarily women and children, fighting for a ten hour day without a pay cut from their typical 12-hour day. Civic leaders and property owners were worried about the gender norms being rejected but also that potential investors would not invest in the city anymore; they also feared the challenging idea of class harmony, and the challenging of capitalist values.

== Strike of 1845 ==
The Allegheny Textile Strike was a peaceful strike until October 7, 1845. On that day, an uprising took place and challenged gender norms in the way women behaved in strikes and protests. Women strikers began mudslinging and using axes to break down the fences surrounding factories. These actions aimed at scaring away scabs that took their place in the factories. The actions carried out by women during the Allegheny Textile Strikes challenged the gender norms of the time and influenced an important part of the population to no longer support the 10-hour work day.

The strike of 1845 was only partially successful, with a law being passed limiting the working day to 10 hours but with provision that a contract could be signed by workers making them work 12.

== Aftermath and the Strike of 1848 ==
On October 13, 1845, civic leaders attempted to write to factory owners and convince them to change the industry's standards to 10-hour work days but they were unsuccessful in this effort. It wasn't until mid-october that factories were reopened with about half of their normal number of workers. In March 1848, a law was finally passed for the 10-hour workday; however, a provision allowed for special contracts of a twelve-hour day. This caused another strike in the textile industry that mirrored the 1845 strike.
