= Selinsgrove Hall and Seibert Hall =

- U.S. National Register of Historic Places
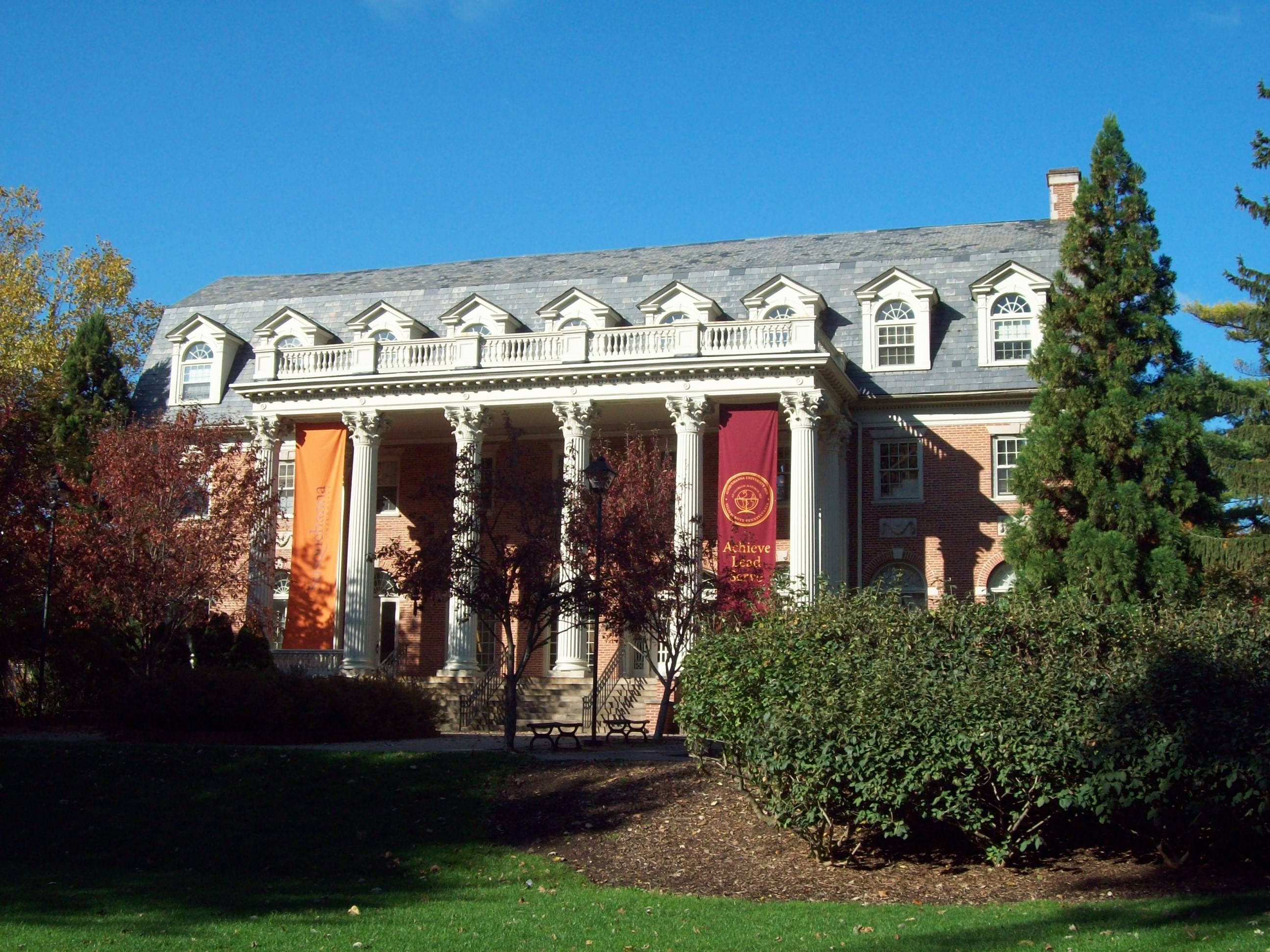
- Seibert Hall, October 2009

- Location within Pennsylvania Location within the United States
- Location: University Ave., Selinsgrove, Pennsylvania
- Coordinates: 40°47′56″N 76°52′19″W
- Area: 6.5 acres (2.6 ha)
- Built: 1858
- Architect: Gaugler, William; Et al.
- Architectural style: Colonial Revival, Italianate
- NRHP reference No.: 79002345
- Added to NRHP: October 25, 1979

Selinsgrove Hall and Seibert Hall are two historic, educational buildings that are located on the campus of Susquehanna University in Selinsgrove in Snyder County, Pennsylvania.

It was listed on the National Register of Historic Places in 1979.

== History and architectural features ==
Selinsgrove Hall is a 3 1/2-story brick building that was designed in the Italianate style and built in 1858. The roof features a wooden cupola. This structure is featured on the university's seal.

Seibert Hall is a 2 1/2-story brick structure that was built in 1902, using a restrained Colonial Revival style.

== Gallery ==
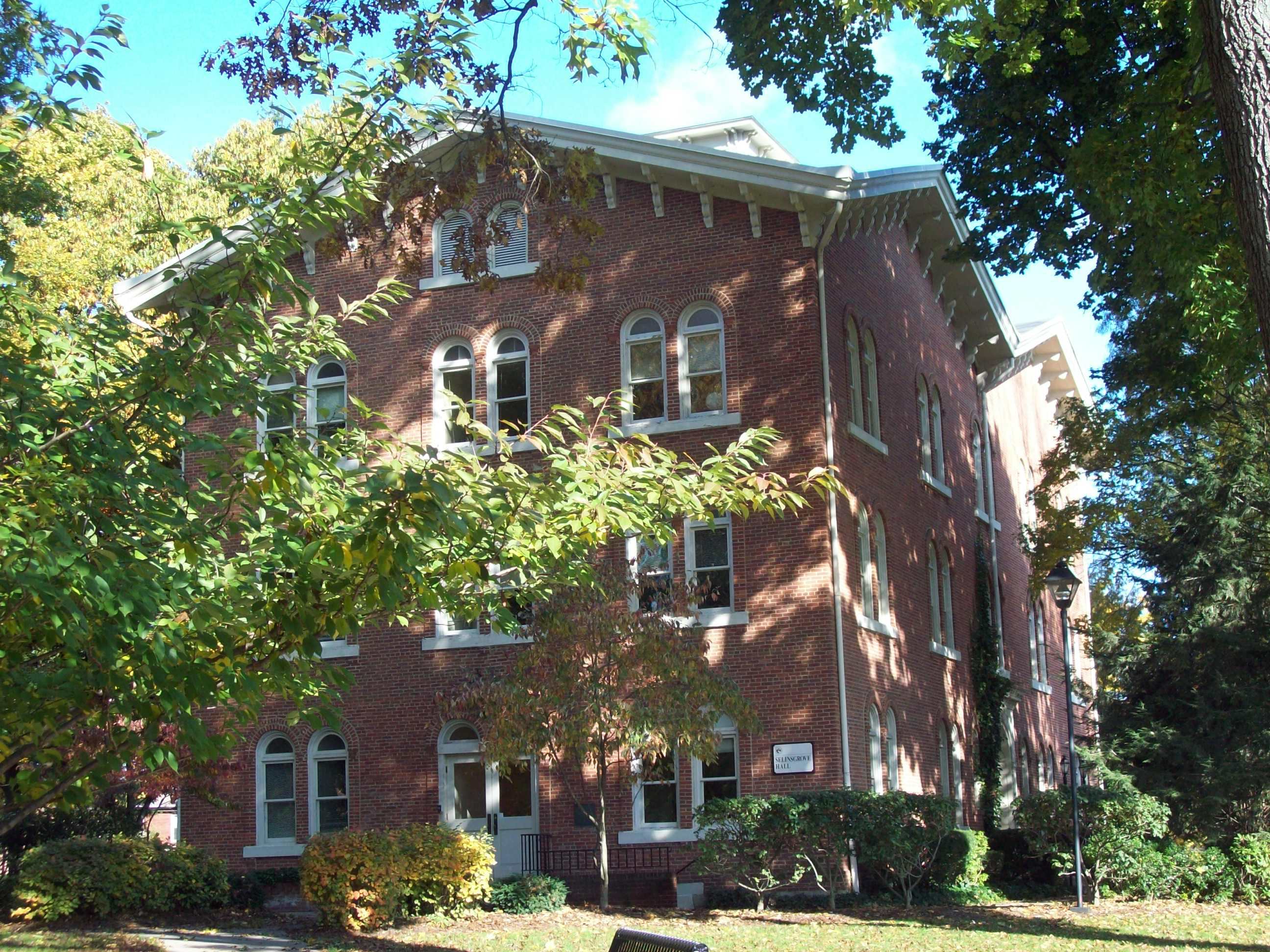
Selinsgrove Hall, October 2009

== See also ==
- National Register of Historic Places listings in Snyder County, Pennsylvania
