= North Oriental Covered Bridge =

- U.S. National Register of Historic Places
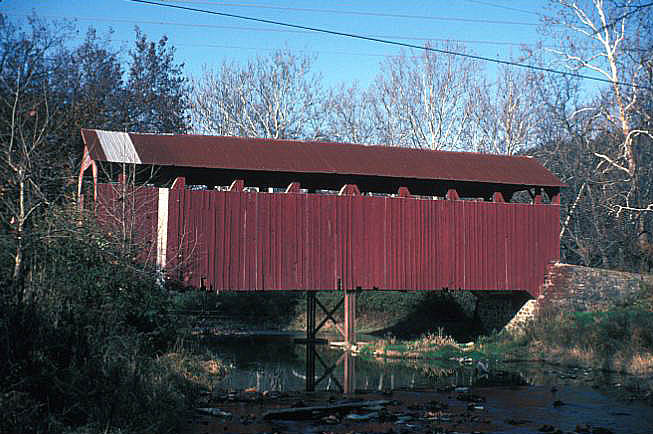

- Location within Pennsylvania Location within the United States
- Nearest city: Meiserville, Pennsylvania and Oriental, Pennsylvania
- Coordinates: 40°39′42″N 77°0′41″W
- Area: 0.1 acres (0.040 ha)
- Architectural style: Multiple Kingpost
- MPS: Covered Bridges of Juniata and Snyder Counties TR
- NRHP reference No.: 79002247
- Added to NRHP: August 10, 1979

The North Oriental Covered Bridge, also known as Beaver Covered Bridge, is a historic wooden covered bridge located at Perry Township near Meiserville in Snyder County, Pennsylvania and Susquehanna Township near Oriental in Juniata County, Pennsylvania. It is a 62-foot-long (19 m) King post bridge. It crosses Mahantango Creek.

It was listed on the National Register of Historic Places in 1979.

== See also ==
- National Register of Historic Places listings in Snyder County, Pennsylvania
