= Arcturus Z. Conrad =

American Christian author, theologian and pastor

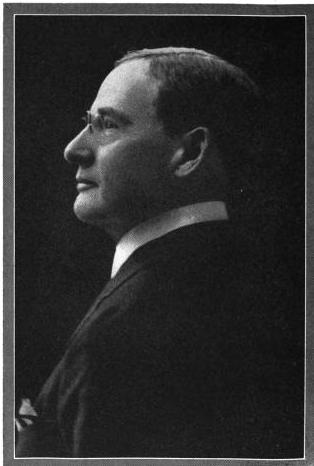
Arcturus Z. Conrad

Arcturus Zodiac Conrad (November 26, 1855-1937) was an American Christian author, theologian, and pastor of Park Street Church in Boston, Massachusetts from 1905 to 1937.

He was born in 1855 on a farm in Shiloh, Indiana to a father who was a Presbyterian minister on the frontier. Conrad was primarily of German and English ancestry. In 1882 Conrad graduated from Carleton College, a Congregationalist school in Minnesota. In 1885 he received a B.D. from Union Theological Seminary; during his years at Union his roommate was Arthur Cushman McGiffert, later a noted church historian. Conrad went on to study at New York University, receiving a Ph.D. from that institution in 1885; in 1893 Carleton College awarded him a D.D. In 1885 he married Harriet Narcissa Adams from Portland, Maine. From 1885 to 1890 he served as pastor of Ainslie Street Presbyterian Church in Brooklyn, New York. He served as pastor of First Congregational Church in Worcester, Massachusetts, for twelve years. He then went west for a period to recover his health. Later he preached at a Congregational church in London, England, before being offered the pastorship of Park Street Church in Boston in 1905 by Pastor John L. Withrow. Withrow and Conrad served together until Withrow's death in 1909. Conrad served as pastor at Park Street until his death in 1937, when he was succeeded by Harold Ockenga. At Park Street, Conrad helped prevent the sale of the meeting house to developers. Conrad is buried at Mount Auburn Cemetery.

== Works ==
- Catastrophe and cataclysm. The great red dragon. : Anti-saloon sermons (1892)
- The religion of Jesus as exemplified in the life and sermons of Bishop Phillips Brooks (1893)
- Fraternity (1895)
- Flashes from my forge. : Excerpts from sermons and public addresses of (1897)
- Worcester's tribute to the ten years' work of Almon Gunnison, D.D. with the First Universalist Church : and a record of the esteem in which he is held by his Worcester Parish and friends (1899)
- Twenty reasons why revivals are desirable (1900)
- Boston's Awakening; a Complete Account of the Great Boston Revival: Under the Leadership of J. Wilbur Chapman and Charles M. Alexander (1909)
- Jesus Christ at the crossroads (1924)
- Comrades of the Carpenter (1926)
- The Seven Finalities of Faith (1926)
- The gospel for an age of thought (1928)
- Secret of the life sublime (1929)
- Radiant religion (1930)
- You must go right on (1931)
- Commemorative Exercises at Park Street Church 1937 by Conrad

== Works about Conrad ==
- Twenty fifth anniversary: pastorate of Rev. A.Z. Conrad (Park Street Church) (1930)
- George W. Harper, 'Christ’s Invitation Is a Broad One': A. Z. Conrad’s Preaching in Gilded Age America, Trinity Journal 37, no. 2 (Fall 2016): 235–249
- George W. Harper, 'It Is a Battle-Royal': A. Z. Conrad’s Preaching at Boston’s Park Street Church during the Fundamentalist-Modernist Controversy, Fides et Historia 45, no. 1 (Winter/Spring 2013): 30–47
- G. Dewey Wigfield, A study of four contemporary preachers : Conrad, Fosdick, Holmes, and Newton (1937)
