= John L. Withrow =

American Presbyterian minister and theologian

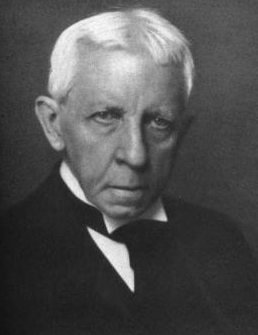
John Withrow

John Lindsay Withrow (1837–1909) was an American Presbyterian minister and theologian.

== Early life and education ==
Withrow was born in Coatesville, Pennsylvania in 1837 to John Mitchell Withrow and Keziah Withrow. As a youth, Withrow studied at Tuscarora Academy and Media Classical Institute. Withrow graduated from Princeton University in 1860 and Princeton Theological Seminary in 1863. He married Anna Judson Hinckel that same year. Withrow later received a D.D. from Lafayette College in 1872 and a LL.D. from Knox College in 1896.

== Career ==
Withrow served successively as pastor of Abington, Pennsylvania's Arch Street Church, Park Street Church in Boston, Massachusetts and Third Presbyterian Church in Chicago for about twelve years. In 1898 Withrow returned to Park Street Church, serving as pastor until 1907. Withrow handpicked Arcturus Conrad as his successor at Park Street, and they served together until Withrow's death.

Withrow also served as Moderator of the General Assembly of the Presbyterian Church in 1896. He served as President of the Chicago's Presbyterian Hospital while residing in that city.

Withrow died in Brookline, Massachusetts of paresis and was buried in Mount Auburn Cemetery. He published various works and sermons.

== Works ==
- "The leading nation: A sermon in behalf of the American Home Missionary Society," preached in the Broadway Tabernacle Church, New York, May 4, 1879
- "The hour for Africa.": An address delivered before the American Colonization Society, January 18, 1881
- "The condition of the heathen and their conversion:" a sermon before the American Board of Commissioners for Foreign Missions at the seventy-seventh annual meeting, held at Des Moines, Iowa, October 5, 1886
