= List of Pennsylvania state historical markers in Northumberland County =

Location of Northumberland County in Pennsylvania

This is a list of the Pennsylvania state historical markers in Northumberland County.

This is intended to be a complete list of the official state historical markers placed in Northumberland County, Pennsylvania by the Pennsylvania Historical and Museum Commission (PHMC). The locations of the historical markers, as well as their latitude and longitude coordinates as provided by the PHMC's database, are included below when available. There are 33 historical markers located in Northumberland County.

== Historical markers ==
Marker title	Image	Date dedicated	Location	Marker type	Topics
Bloody Spring, The		June 14, 1967	N. 7th St. extension between Shikellamy Ave. & Memorial Park, Sunbury	Roadside	Forts, French & Indian War, Military, Native American
Bucknell University		September 22, 1947	Pa. 405 at junction Pa. 45 3 miles S of Milton	Roadside	Education, Religion
Captain John Brady - PLAQUE		September 1928	PA 405 (E side), .5 mile S of intersection PA 45, Milton	Plaque	American Revolution, Exploration, Forts, French & Indian War, Military, Native American
Col. Matthew Smith		March 9, 1949	SR 1007 (old Pa. 147) at Warrior Run Church N of McEwensville	Roadside	American Revolution, Government & Politics 18th Century, Military
Danville-Pottsville R.R.		November 21, 1947	Pa. 147 (Front St.), Sunbury; 40.85957°N 76.79837°W	Roadside	Railroads, Transportation
First Electric Light		October 30, 1947	Pa. 147 (Front St.) at Market St., Sunbury; 40.862°N 76.79453°W	Roadside	Business & Industry, Electricity
Fort Augusta		n/a	Pa. 147 (Front St.) at site, Sunbury; 40.86443°N 76.79595°W	Roadside	Forts, French & Indian War, Military
Fort Augusta - PLAQUE		July 1929	PA 14 in Sunbury	Plaque	American Revolution, Forts, Military, Native American
Fort Freeland		February 18, 1947	SR 1007 (old Pa. 147) near Warrior Run Church N of McEwensville	Roadside	American Revolution, Forts, Military, Native American
Fort Freeland - PLAQUE		July 1929	SR 1007 (old PA 147), Warrior Run Church N of McEwensville	Plaque	American Revolution, Forts, Military, Native American
Gen. James M. Gavin		September 15, 2001	West Avenue & Maple Streets, Mt. Carmel; 40.79858°N 76.4151°W	Roadside	Government & Politics 20th Century, Military, Military Post-Civil War
Great Shamokin Path		October 1949	Pa. 405, 3.9 miles S of Milton	Roadside	Native American, Paths & Trails, Transportation
Great Shamokin Path		October 1, 1949	8.9 miles N of Milton (Missing)	Roadside	Native American, Paths & Trails, Transportation
James Pollock		June 20, 1951	Pa. 405, .2 mile N of Milton (Missing)	Roadside	Canals, Government & Politics, Government & Politics 19th Century, Governors, Railroads
Joseph Priestley		October 3, 1947	U.S. 11 NE of Northumberland	Roadside	Ethnic & Immigration, Medicine & Science, Professions & Vocations
Joseph Priestley		October 3, 1947	Duke St. (PA 147) at 10th St., Northumberland; 40.89463°N 76.80997°W	Roadside	Medicine & Science
Joseph Priestley House		September 19, 1963	472 Priestley Ave., Northumberland	Roadside	Buildings, Ethnic & Immigration, Houses & Homesteads, Medicine & Science, Professions & Vocations
Lorenzo da Ponte (1749-1838)		October 22, 1994	Cameron Park, 3rd & Market Sts., Sunbury; 40.8617°N 76.79335°W	Roadside	Music & Theater
Northumberland County		July 13, 1982	Courthouse, 2nd & Market Sts., Sunbury; 40.862°N 76.79453°W	City	Government & Politics, Government & Politics 18th Century
Pennsylvania Canal		June 17, 1952	U.S. 11, Northumberland, Near E end of bridge	Roadside	Canals, Navigation, Transportation
Pennsylvania Canal		June 17, 1952	U.S. 11, 3.5 miles NE of Northumberland	Roadside	Canals, Navigation, Transportation
Shikellamy		October 1, 1947	Front St. (PA 147) between John & Julia Sts., at Fort Augusta site, Sunbury; 40.87607°N 76.79212°W	Roadside	Early Settlement, Native American
Shikellamy - PLAQUE		October 1, 1915	PA 147 (Front St.) just N of Fort Augusta site, Sunbury; 40.8773°N 76.79012°W	Plaque	Government & Politics 18th Century, Native American
Shikellamy's Town		October 6, 1947	Pa. 405, .5 mile S of Milton	Roadside	Early Settlement, Native American
Sodom School		May 8, 1969	At property, Pa. 45, 1 mile E of Montandon; 40.96587°N 76.82668°W	Roadside	Buildings, Education
Sunbury		October 30, 1947	Route 147/61 (Front St.), at Weis Markets HQ, S end of Sunbury; 40.84727°N 76.80257°W	Roadside	Business & Industry, Cities & Towns, Forts, Government & Politics, Transportation
Sunbury		October 30, 1947	Highland St. (PA 61) near Green St., E end of Sunbury	City	Business & Industry, Forts, Government & Politics 18th Century, Transportation
Thompson's Rifle Battalion: Capt. John Lowdon's Company		June 3, 1987	Front St. (PA 147) between John & Julia Sts., at Hunter Home, Fort Augusta, Sunbury; 40.87607°N 76.79212°W	Roadside	American Revolution, Military
Tulpehocken Path		January 11, 1950	SR 3016, east side, N of Klingerstown; 40.67054°N 76.70231°W	Roadside	Native American, Paths & Trails, Transportation
Tulpehocken Path		November 10, 1950	Pa. 147, at Wise Rd., N of Herndon; 40.72157°N 76.83751°W	Roadside	Native American, Paths & Trails, Transportation
Warrior Run Church		February 18, 1947	SR 1007 (old Pa. 147) at site N of McEwensville	Roadside	Buildings, Native American, Religion
William Maclay		October 1, 1947	Front St. (PA 147) betw. Market St. and Woodlawn Ave., Sunbury; 40.86347°N 76.79633°W	Roadside	George Washington, Government & Politics, Government & Politics 18th Century
Wyoming Path		March 23, 1949	U.S. 11 NE of Northumberland	Roadside	Native American, Paths & Trails, Transportation

== See also ==
- List of Pennsylvania state historical markers
- National Register of Historic Places listings in Northumberland County, Pennsylvania
