= Nook, Pennsylvania =

Unincorporated community in Pennsylvania, US

Coordinates: 40°30′25″N 77°31′40″W

Nook is a hamlet in Juniata County, Pennsylvania, United States. Nook is located in Beale Township, along Pennsylvania Route 35, with a zip code of 17058. Mennonites and other persons of Pennsylvania Dutch descent inhabit the small settlement.
