= Beale Township, Pennsylvania =

Township in Pennsylvania, US

Coordinates: 40°31′00″N 77°28′59″W

- Township
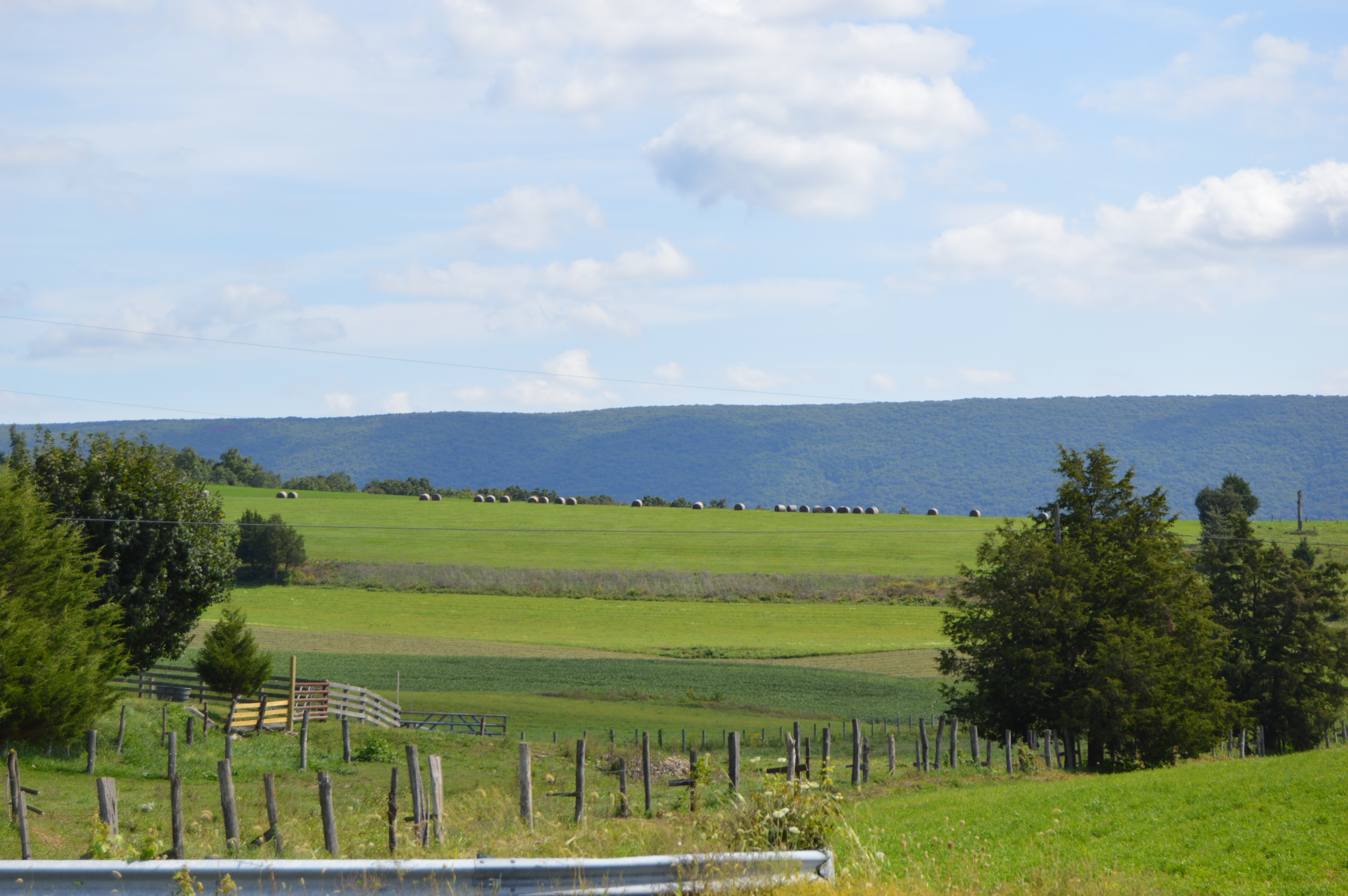
- Fields south of Academia with Limestone Ridge in the background

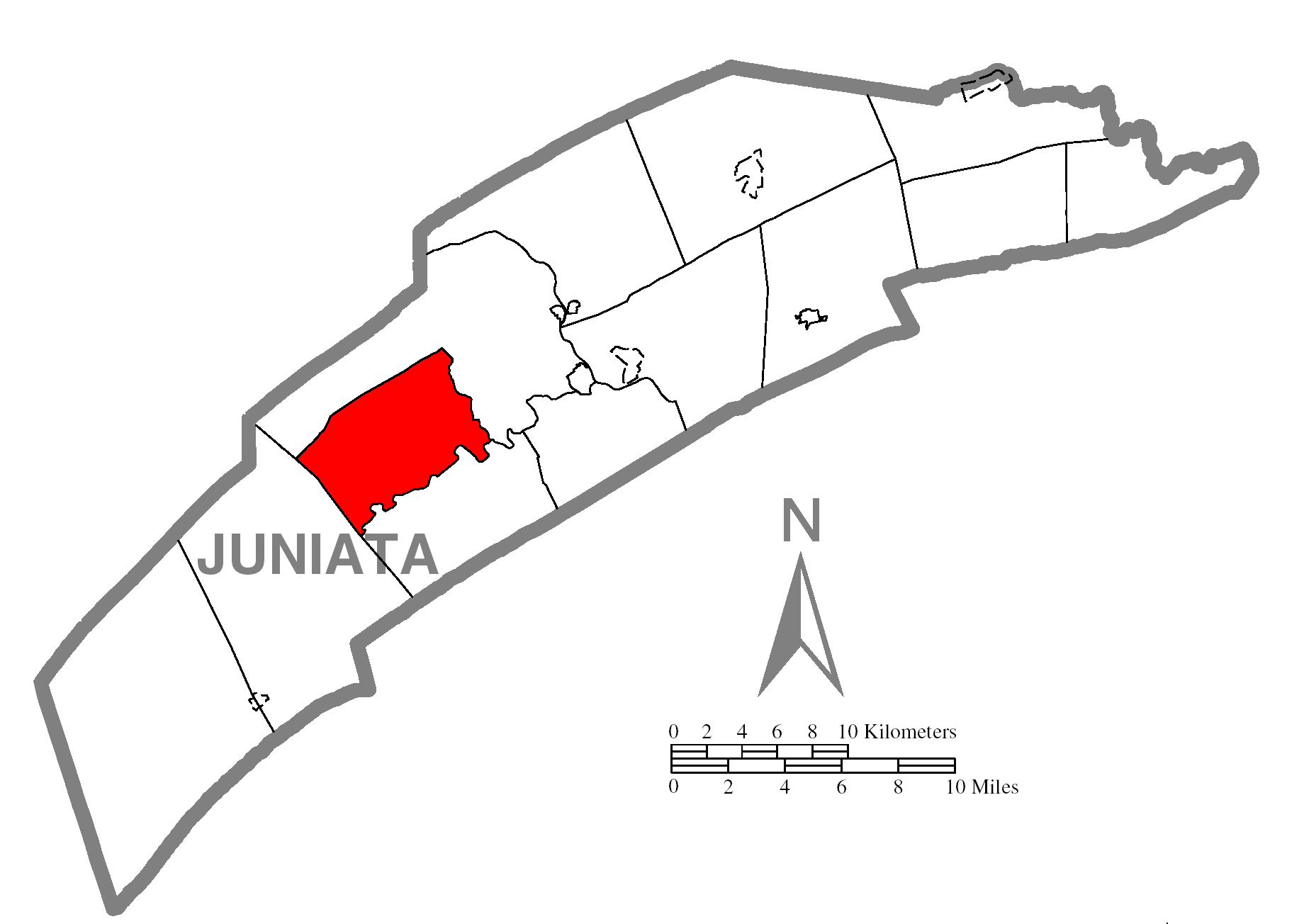
- Map of Juniata County, Pennsylvania highlighting Beale Township

- Map of Juniata County, Pennsylvania
- Country: United States
- State: Pennsylvania
- County: Juniata
- Settled: 1775
- Incorporated: 1843

Area
  - Total: 21.89 sq mi (56.69 km^{2})
  - Land: 21.89 sq mi (56.69 km^{2})
  - Water: 0 sq mi (0.00 km^{2})

Population (2020)
  - Total: 769 ▼
  - Estimate (2022): 773
  - Density: 38/sq mi (14.8/km^{2})
- Time zone: UTC-5 (EST)
  - Summer (DST): UTC-4 (EDT)
- Area code: 717
- FIPS code: 42-067-04560

Beale Township is a township in Juniata County, Pennsylvania, United States. The population was 769 at the 2020 census, a decline from the figure of 830 tabulated in 2010.

== History ==
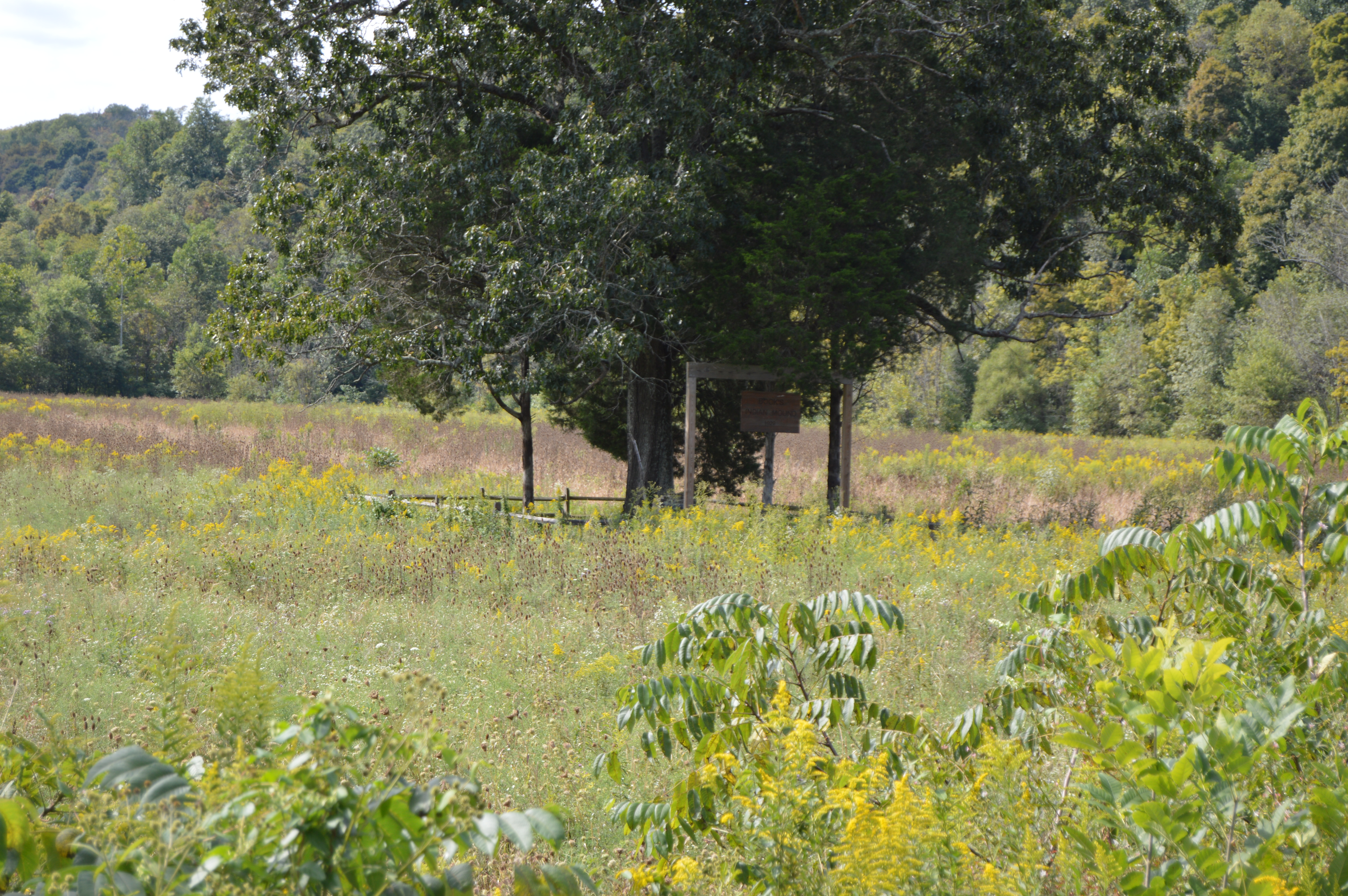
The Book Site

Beale Township is the location of the Book Site, an archaeological site dating from the Woodland period. It is listed on the National Register of Historic Places. The Academia Pomeroy Covered Bridge and Tuscarora Academy are also listed. The Academia Pomeroy Covered Bridge at 278 feet (85 m) (portal to portal) is the longest remaining covered bridge in Pennsylvania, crossing Tuscarora Creek between Spruce Hill and Beale Townships. It has been owned by the Juniata County Historical Society of Mifflintown since 1962.

== Geography ==
The township is in west-central Juniata County, in the Ridge and Valley province of the Appalachian Mountains. It is bounded by Shade Mountain to the north and Tuscarora Creek to the south. The Herringbone Ridges form a set of low parallel ridges crossing the center of the township.

Unincorporated communities in the township include Walnut, Nook, Doyles Mills, and Academia. Pennsylvania Route 35 crosses the northern side of the township, following the valley between Shade Mountain and Herringbone Ridges.

According to the United States Census Bureau, the township has a total area of 21.9 square miles (56.7 km^{2}), all land. The township is drained by Tuscarora Creek and its tributaries and is part of the Juniata River watershed, flowing to the Susquehanna River.

Beale Township is the only township in Juniata County that does not border one of the counties surrounding Juniata. It is bordered by Milford Township to the north and east, Spruce Hill Township to the south and Tuscarora Township to the west.

== Demographics ==
Historical population
| Census | Pop. | Note | %± |
|---|---|---|---|
| 1850 | 744 | | — |
| 1860 | 987 | | 32.7% |
| 1870 | 1,039 | | 5.3% |
| 1880 | 1,130 | | 8.8% |
| 1890 | 932 | | −17.5% |
| 1900 | 895 | | −4.0% |
| 1910 | 703 | | −21.5% |
| 1920 | 582 | | −17.2% |
| 1930 | 555 | | −4.6% |
| 1940 | 583 | | 5.0% |
| 1950 | 522 | | −10.5% |
| 1960 | 482 | | −7.7% |
| 1970 | 549 | | 13.9% |
| 1980 | 578 | | 5.3% |
| 1990 | 629 | | 8.8% |
| 2000 | 726 | | 15.4% |
| 2010 | 830 | | 14.3% |
| 2020 | 769 | | −7.3% |
| 2022 (est.) | 773 | | 0.5% |
U.S. Decennial Census

As of the census of 2000, there were 726 people, 254 households, and 205 families residing in the township. The population density was 33.2 inhabitants per square mile (12.8/km^{2}). There were 328 housing units at an average density of 15.0/sq mi (5.8/km^{2}). The racial makeup of the township was 97.66% White, 0.69% African American, 0.55% Asian, 0.41% from other races, and 0.69% from two or more races. Hispanic or Latino of any race were 1.38% of the population.

There were 254 households, out of which 36.2% had children under the age of 18 living with them, 70.1% were married couples living together, 5.1% had a female householder with no husband present, and 18.9% were non-families. 15.4% of all households were made up of individuals, and 6.3% had someone living alone who was 65 years of age or older. The average household size was 2.86 and the average family size was 3.17.

In the township the population was spread out, with 28.0% under the age of 18, 7.0% from 18 to 24, 30.2% from 25 to 44, 23.1% from 45 to 64, and 11.7% who were 65 years of age or older. The median age was 37 years. For every 100 females, there were 108.6 males. For every 100 females age 18 and over, there were 107.5 males.

The median income for a household in the township was $41,458, and the median income for a family was $43,625. Males had a median income of $31,087 versus $21,818 for females. The per capita income for the township was $16,988. About 6.4% of families and 7.4% of the population were below the poverty line, including 10.6% of those under age 18 and 1.1% of those age 65 or over.
