= Casimir Sienkiewicz =

American economist

- Born: Casimir Anthony Sienkiewicz; July 1, 1892; Białystok, Congress Poland
- Died: June 24, 1974 (aged 81); Doylestown, Pennsylvania, US
- Occupations: Economist and banker
- Known for: Named first chairman of the Southeastern Pennsylvania Transportation Authority (SEPTA), 1964; also was a well-known impressionist painter
- Spouse: Jane Patton

Casimir Anthony Sienkiewicz (July 1, 1892 in Białystok, Congress Poland – June 24, 1974 in Doylestown, Pennsylvania, United States) was a prominent American economist and banker who emigrated from Congress Poland in 1906.

He was also the first chairman of the Southeastern Pennsylvania Transportation Authority (SEPTA).

== Biography ==
A 1919 graduate of Princeton University, Sienkiewicz became an advisor to federal, state, and local governments and an active civic and community leader. A well-known impressionist painter, he was the husband of Jane (Patton) Sienkiewicz and the father of John C. Sienkiewicz (1933–2012), Wilbur P. ("Bur") Sienkiewicz and Michael A. Sienkiewicz.

He joined the Federal Reserve Bank in Philadelphia in 1919 and eventually rose to vice president in charge of research, statistics, and bank and public relations.

From 1945 to 1946, he served on the United States House of Representatives' bipartisan post-war policy and planning committee.

In 1947, he joined the Central-Penn National Bank of Philadelphia as its president, and later served as chairman of the board and chief executive officer. During this time, he was also a president of the Pennsylvania Bankers Association and, from 1958 to 1960, represented the Federal Reserve's third district as a member of the Federal Advisory Council.

During the early 1960s, he chaired the Philadelphia Passenger Service Improvement Corporation. In 1964, he was named first chairman of the Southeastern Pennsylvania Transportation Authority (SEPTA), one of the largest urban mass transit agencies in the nation. During his tenure as chair, Pennsylvania's state auditor general ordered a review of SEPTA's handling of state funds.

In 2006, a historical marker was placed in front of his long-time Doylestown residence by the Pennsylvania Historical & Museum Commission, recognizing his service and achievements.

== Philanthropic and civic affairs activities ==
A member of the United Fund's executive committee and board of trustees during the 1950s, he chaired the fund's 1958 campaign. Between 1963 and 1965, he served as the chair of the building fund for the Jefferson Medical College and Medical Center. A member of the board of trustees for the Associated Hospital Service of Philadelphia (Blue Cross) and of the board of trustees of the Solebury School in New Hope, he also served as vice chair of the board of trustees of Doylestown's Tabor Home for Children and chaired the Doylestown Borough Authority.

== Death and funeral ==
He died in his early eighties in Doylestown, Pennsylvania on June 24, 1974. His funeral was held at the Presbyterian Church in Doylestown on Friday, June 28.
