= List of Pennsylvania state historical markers =

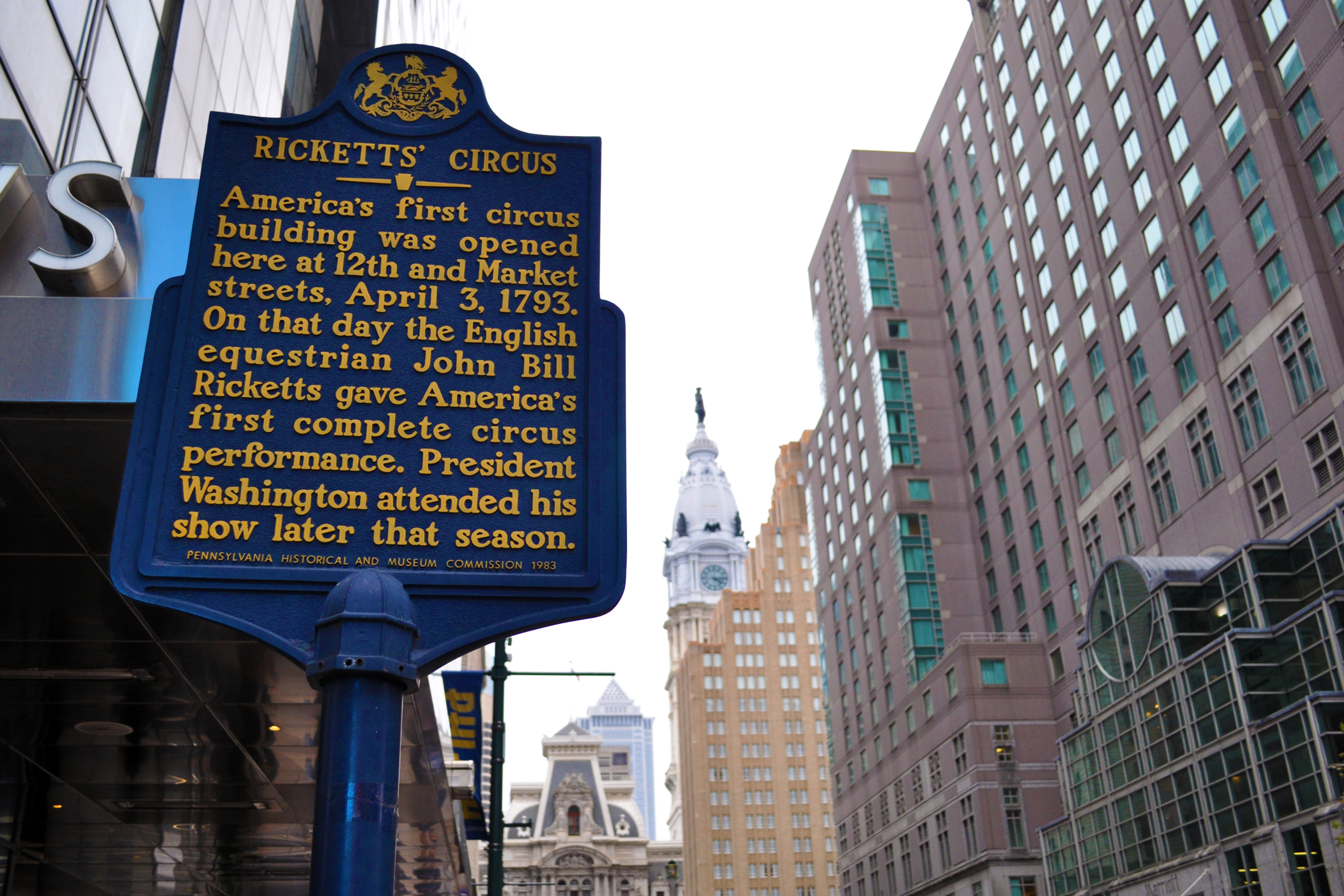
A city style marker in Philadelphia, the state's largest city

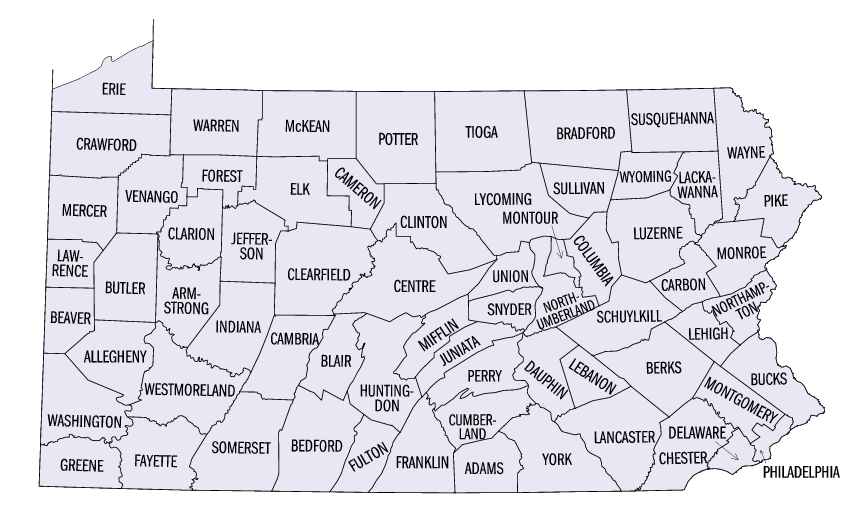
Clickable map of Pennsylvania counties

This is a list of Pennsylvania State Historical Markers which were first placed by the Commonwealth of Pennsylvania in 1914 and are currently overseen by the Pennsylvania Historical and Museum Commission (PHMC) as part of its Historical Markers Program. Since the modern PHMC program began in 1946, there have been over 2,000 historical sites in all 67 Pennsylvania counties that are marked by an official Pennsylvania state historical marker.

== History ==
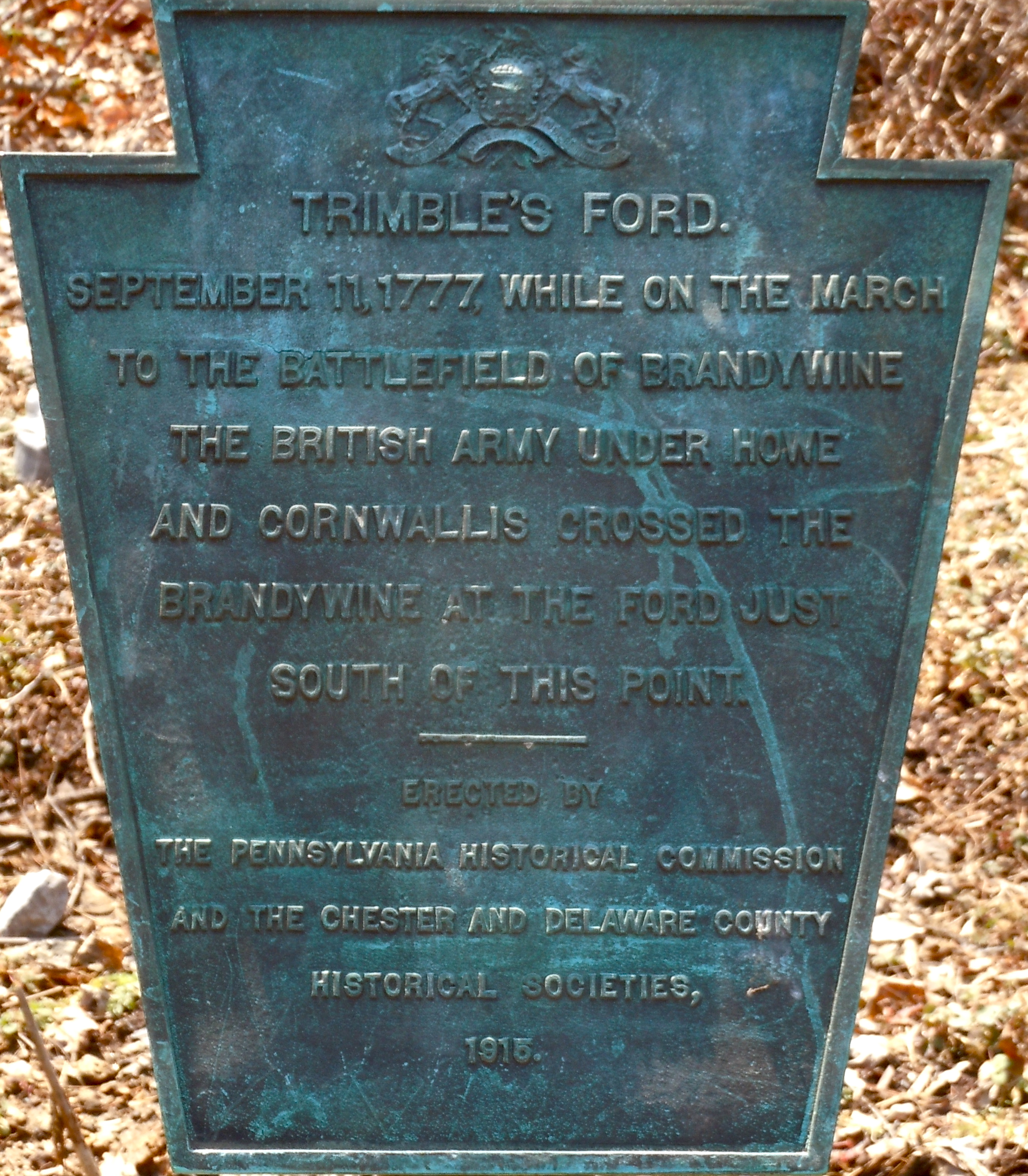
Early Pennsylvania historical marker added in 1915 at Trimble's Ford

The Historical Markers Program was authorized by the Commonwealth of Pennsylvania when it created Pennsylvania Historical Commission (PHC), the precursor of the Pennsylvania Historical and Museum Commission (PHMC), through the Act of the General Assembly No. 777, on July 25, 1913. The PHC was empowered to mark by proper monuments, tablets, or markers, places or buildings within the Commonwealth where historical events transpired.

The earliest markers were bronze plaques often mounted on large stones gathered from the Pennsylvania countryside. Philadelphia architect Paul Philippe Cret designed later bronze plaques that included the state's coat of arms with text laid out within a rectangular double border. Starting in 1945, markers were cast of aluminum, used gold-colored text of raised characters on a deep blue background within a silver-colored frame, and were initially affixed to concrete posts, so as to be more easily seen by motorists alongside roads. Eventually smaller and narrower city markers were added for their better suitability in urban settings.

== Listings of markers by county ==
The following are approximate tallies of current marker listings in Pennsylvania by county. These counts are based on entries in the Pennsylvania Historical and Museum Commission's database as of August, 2020. There are yearly additions to the listings and some markers may be missing or stolen. (Approved markers)

Markers by county
County	Sites
Adams	45
Allegheny	156
Armstrong	13
Beaver	17
Bedford	35
Berks	66
Blair	27
Bradford	46
Bucks	79
Butler	15
Cambria	27
Cameron	8
Carbon	11
Centre	30
Chester	75
Clarion	7
Clearfield	12
Clinton	12
Columbia	9
Crawford	38
Cumberland	75
Dauphin	88
Delaware	67
Elk	4
Erie	56
Fayette	51
Forest	11
Franklin	70
Fulton	12
Greene	12
Huntingdon	23
Indiana	16
Jefferson	13
Juniata	5
Lackawanna	34
Lancaster	82
Lawrence	17
Lebanon	32
Lehigh	29
Luzerne	71
Lycoming	30
McKean	18
Mercer	20
Mifflin	12
Monroe	24
Montgomery	60
Montour	6
Northampton	75
Northumberland	32
Perry	15
Philadelphia	320
Pike	19
Potter	11
Schuylkill	26
Snyder	15
Somerset	31
Sullivan	6
Susquehanna	12
Tioga	16
Union	22
Venango	32
Warren	16
Washington	56
Wayne	15
Westmoreland	45
Wyoming	13
York	67
Total	2,509

== See also ==
- National Register of Historic Places listings in Pennsylvania
- ArcGIS Data of markers - 1910 - 2010
