= Susquehanna Township, Juniata County, Pennsylvania =

Township in Pennsylvania, US

Coordinates: 40°37′00″N 77°00′59″W

- Township
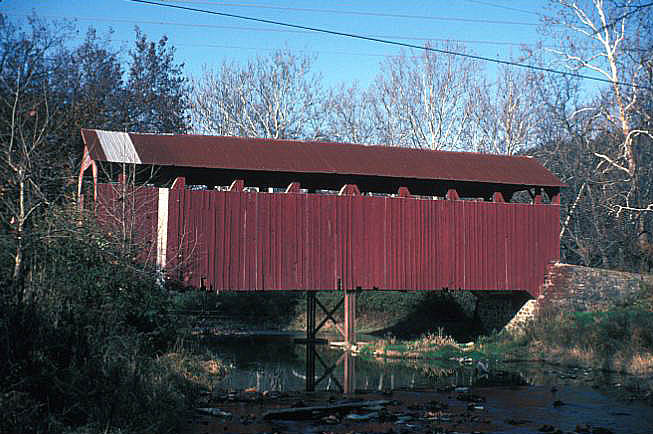
- North Oriental Covered Bridge

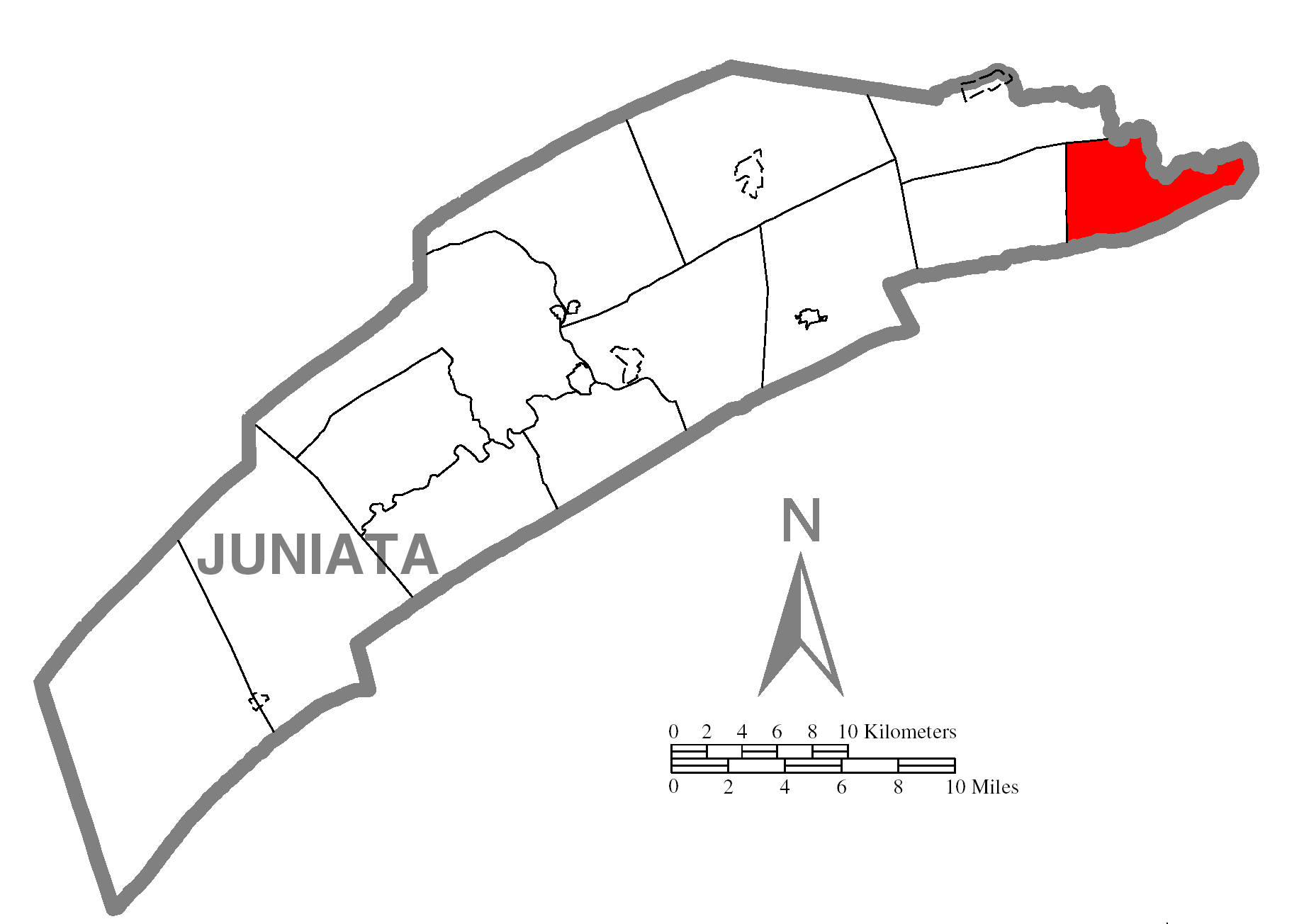
- Map of Juniata County, Pennsylvania highlighting Susquehanna Township

- Map of Juniata County, Pennsylvania
- Country: United States
- State: Pennsylvania
- County: Juniata
- Settled: 1755
- Incorporated: 1858

Area
  - Total: 16.52 sq mi (42.78 km^{2})
  - Land: 16.52 sq mi (42.78 km^{2})
  - Water: 0 sq mi (0.00 km^{2})

Population (2020)
  - Total: 1,205 ▼
  - Estimate (2022): 1,187
  - Density: 76.7/sq mi (29.62/km^{2})
- Time zone: UTC-5 (EST)
  - Summer (DST): UTC-4 (EDT)
- Area code: 717
- FIPS code: 42-067-75536

Susquehanna Township is a township in Juniata County, Pennsylvania, United States. The population was 1,205 at the 2020 census.

== History ==
The East Oriental Covered Bridge and North Oriental Covered Bridge are listed on the National Register of Historic Places.

== Geography ==
The township is at the eastern end of Juniata County. According to the United States Census Bureau, the township has a total area of 16.5 square miles (42.8 km^{2}), all land.

Susquehanna Township is bordered by Monroe Township and Snyder County to the north. Mahantango Creek and its west branch form the boundary with Snyder County. The Susquehanna River forms the eastern boundary with Northumberland County. Susquehanna Township is bordered by Perry County to the south and Greenwood Township to the west. The township's southern border follows the crest of Turkey Ridge.

The unincorporated community of Oriental is at the center of the township.

U.S. Routes 11 and 15 run concurrently on a four-lane divided highway and cross the eastern end of the township, leading north to Selinsgrove and south to Liverpool. Pennsylvania Route 104 crosses the eastern part of the township, leading south to Routes 11 and 15, and north to Middleburg. Pennsylvania Route 235 crosses the southwestern corner of the township, leading south to Liverpool and west to East Salem.

== Demographics ==
Historical population
Census	Pop.	Note	%±
1860	820		—
1870	890		8.5%
1880	733		−17.6%
1890	697		−4.9%
1900	601		−13.8%
1910	531		−11.6%
1920	454		−14.5%
1930	406		−10.6%
1940	429		5.7%
1950	513		19.6%
1960	587		14.4%
1970	569		−3.1%
1980	823		44.6%
1990	1,022		24.2%
2000	1,261		23.4%
2010	1,250		−0.9%
2020	1,205		−3.6%
2022 (est.)	1,187		−1.5%
U.S. Decennial Census

As of the census of 2000, there were 1,261 people, 403 households, and 336 families residing in the township. The population density was 76.5 inhabitants per square mile (29.5/km^{2}). There were 444 housing units at an average density of 26.9 per square mile (10.4/km^{2}). The racial makeup of the township was 98.41% White, 0.24% African American, 0.08% Native American, 0.08% Asian, and 1.19% from two or more races. Hispanic or Latino of any race were 0.08% of the population.

There were 403 households, out of which 38.7% had children under the age of 18 living with them, 72.7% were married couples living together, 5.2% had a female householder with no husband present, and 16.6% were non-families. 12.4% of all households were made up of individuals, and 5.0% had someone living alone who was 65 years of age or older. The average household size was 2.84 and the average family size was 3.09.

In the township the population was spread out, with 23.8% under the age of 18, 9.6% from 18 to 24, 27.9% from 25 to 44, 22.4% from 45 to 64, and 16.3% who were 65 years of age or older. The median age was 37 years. For every 100 females there were 97.0 males. For every 100 females age 18 and over, there were 95.7 males.

The median income for a household in the township was $40,598, and the median income for a family was $42,885. Males had a median income of $30,313 versus $24,091 for females. The per capita income for the township was $14,890. About 4.3% of families and 7.5% of the population were below the poverty line, including 9.5% of those under age 18 and 12.2% of those age 65 or over.
