= Book site =

Archaeological type site in Pennsylvania, United States of America

- Book Site (36 Jul)
- U.S. National Register of Historic Places
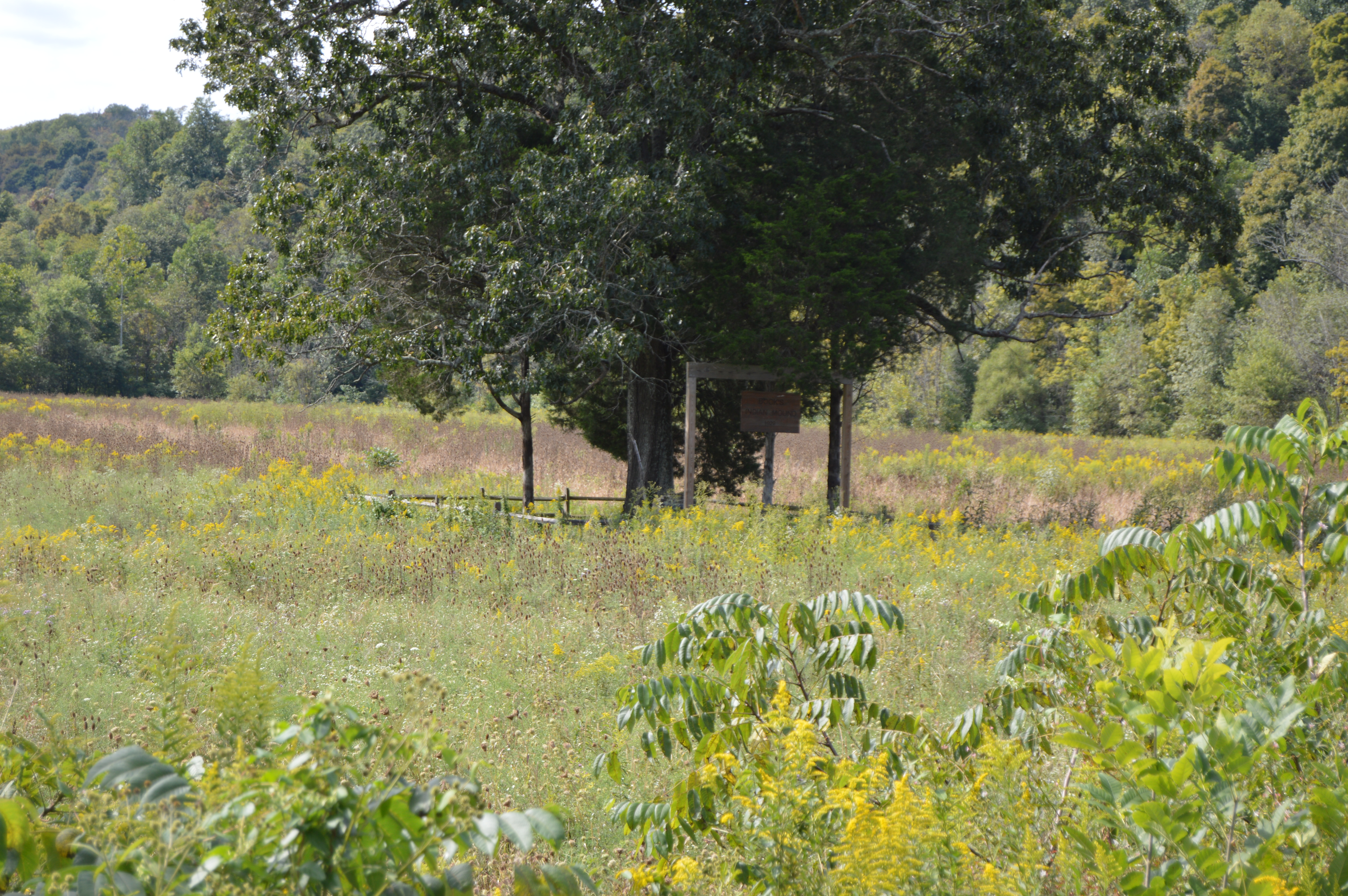
- Roadside view of the Indian mound

- Location within Pennsylvania Location within the United States
- Location: Off Camp Resort Road along the Enlow Fork in Beale Township, Juniata County, Pennsylvania, United States
- Nearest city: Beale
- Coordinates: 40°28′44.5″N 77°30′2.4″W
- Area: 15 acres (6.1 ha)
- NRHP reference No.: 86000067
- Added to NRHP: January 3, 1986

The Book Site is an archaeological site in Juniata County, Pennsylvania, United States. Consisting of the remnants of a burial mound and a prehistoric village, the site lies on both sides of Camp Resort Road in Beale Township, near the community of Beale.

== Archaeology ==
Since the first white settlement of Juniata County, the area now named the Book Site has been known as a location of prehistoric interest; local tradition held that it was once occupied by an Indian fort. By the middle of the nineteenth century, skeletons were being removed from the mound as the result of cultivation, and individuals periodically dug in the mound into the 1920s. A professional investigation of the site was conducted in the summer and autumn of 1929; the archaeologists discovered a wide range of pottery, many projectile points, and a large number of bones, including twenty-two skulls. The combination of artifacts and the site's location slightly above a large stream have led to its identification as a work of the Clemson Island culture (AD 700–1300) during the early Late Woodland period.

Fields to the north and east of the mound have also been known to produce small artifacts, such as stone chips and flakes. Unlike the mound, the surrounding fields have never been excavated professionally; however, as all other known mounds of the Clemson Island culture are associated with villages, the presence of the artifacts in the fields indicates that a village site was once located in the fields to the north of the mound.

== Significance ==
Comparison with similar sites in New York indicates that the Book Site is among the earliest Late Woodland sites in central Pennsylvania. Moreover, the large amount of Clemson Island pottery makes it a type site for this kind of pottery; consequently, the Book Site is a prime archaeological site. In 1986, the site was added to the National Register of Historic Places in recognition of its archaeological value.

== See also ==
- List of Native American archaeological sites on the National Register of Historic Places in Pennsylvania
