= Gov. Simon Snyder Mansion =

Historic house in Pennsylvania, United States

- U.S. National Register of Historic Places
- Pennsylvania state historical marker
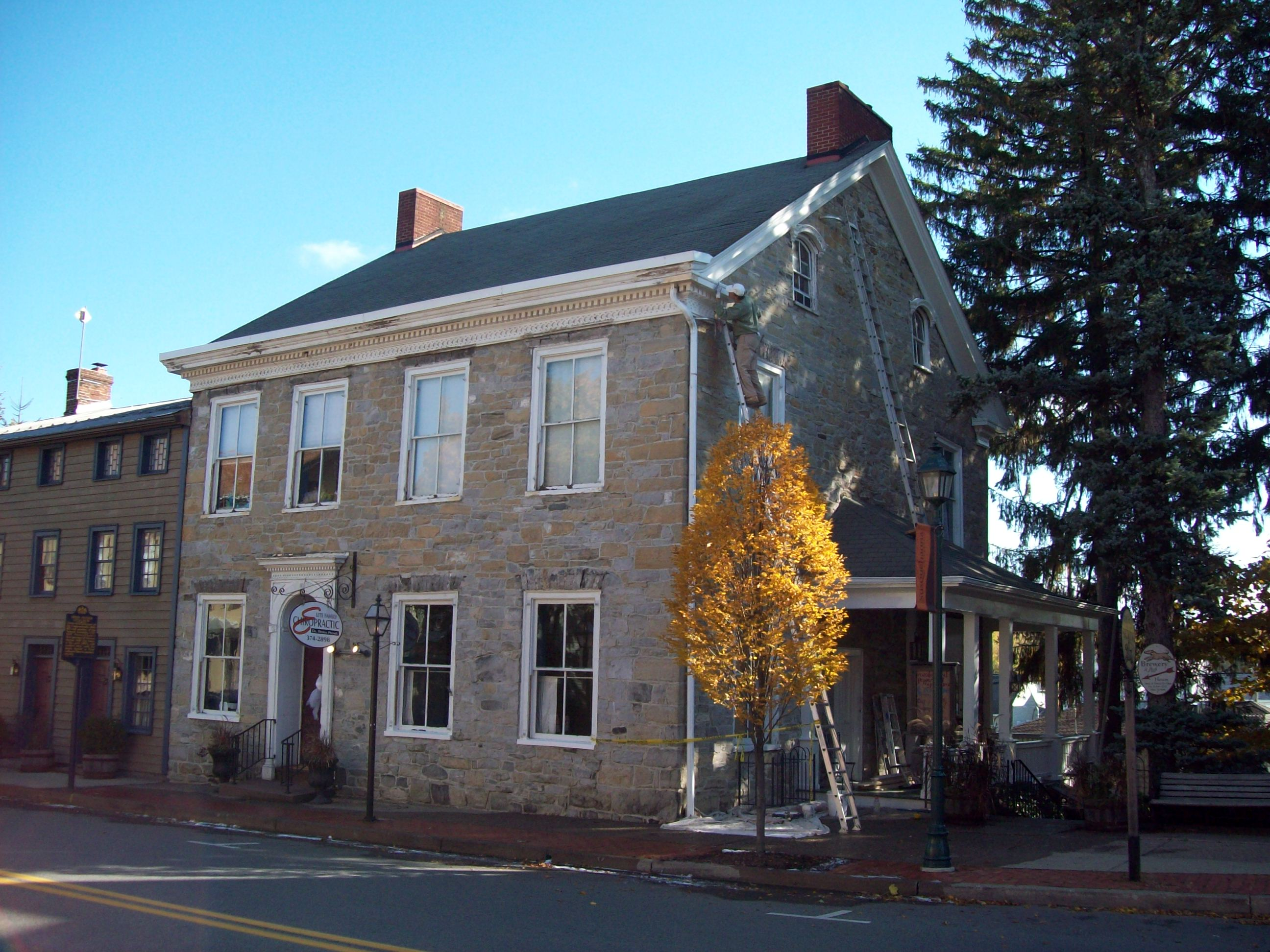
- Gov. Simon Snyder Mansion, October 2009

- Location within Pennsylvania Location within the United States
- Location: 119--121 N. Market St., Selinsgrove, Pennsylvania
- Coordinates: 40.80093°N 76.86138°W
- Area: 0.2 acres (0.081 ha)
- Built: 1824
- NRHP reference No.: 78002470

Significant dates
- Added to NRHP: August 25, 1978
- Designated PHMC: 2007

The Gov. Simon Snyder Mansion is an historic home that is located in Selinsgrove in Snyder County, Pennsylvania, United States.

The home of the third Governor of Pennsylvania, Simon Snyder (1759–1819), it was listed on the National Register of Historic Places in 1978.

== History and architectural features ==
This historic residence is a 2½-story, stone house that was built during the early nineteenth century. It features a gable roof and two gable end chimneys. The building suffered a fire in 1874, after which a Victorian style porch and bay window were added. It was the home of the third Governor of Pennsylvania Simon Snyder (1759–1819).

== See also ==
- National Register of Historic Places listings in Snyder County, Pennsylvania
