= Fallsington Historic District =

Historic district in Pennsylvania, United States

- U.S. National Register of Historic Places
- U.S. Historic district
- Pennsylvania state historical marker
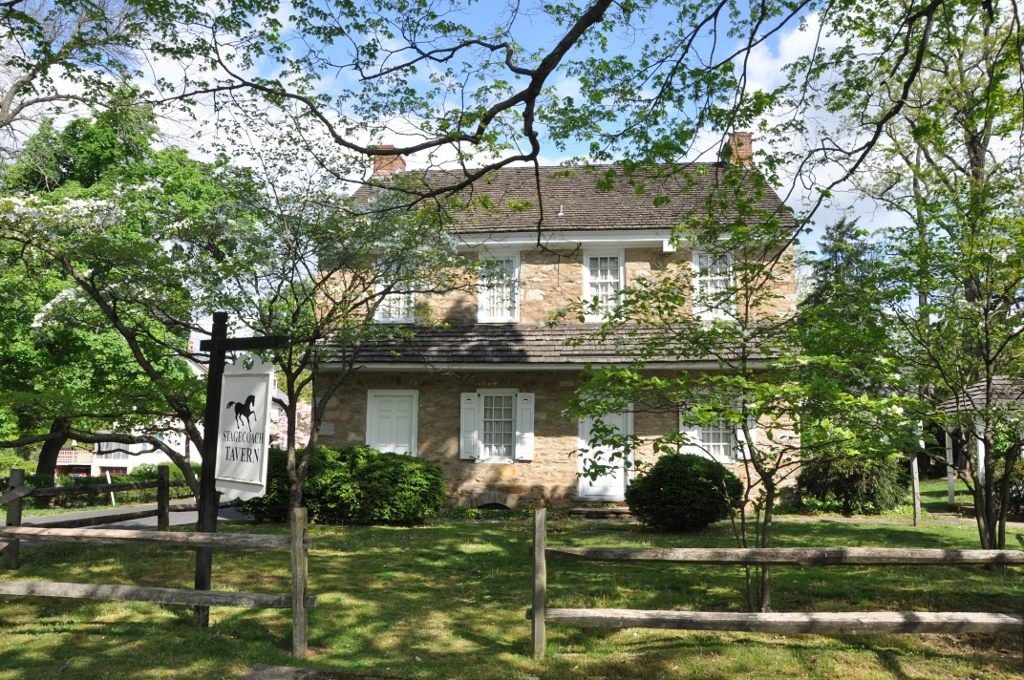
- The Stage Coach Tavern

- Location within Pennsylvania Location within the United States
- Location: South of U.S. 1, East of New Tyburn Road, Fallsington, Pennsylvania
- Coordinates: 40°11′12″N 74°49′10″W
- Area: 170 acres (69 ha)
- Architectural style: Late Victorian, Colonial, Federal
- NRHP reference No.: 72001099

Significant dates
- Added to NRHP: June 19, 1972
- Designated PHMC: June 03, 1961

The Fallsington Historic District is a historic district in Fallsington, Pennsylvania.

The district's history spans over 300 years. While William Penn resided at nearby Pennsbury Manor, he attended Friends meeting in Fallsington. The center of the district is Meetinghouse Square, where the first meetinghouse was built in 1690. The third meetinghouse, built in 1790, is currently used as a community center, the William Penn Center. The fourth meetinghouse on the square, built in 1841, still operates as a place of worship for Quakers.

Historic Falsington offers tours of the district, including the interiors of three preserved buildings: the Moon-Williamson Log House, Burges-Lippincott House, and the Stagecoach Tavern.

The district was added to the National Register of Historic Places in 1972. It comprises 62 contributing buildings, one contributing site, and two contributing objects.

== Quaker meeting houses ==
The first meeting house in the district was built in 1690. Its site is marked by a bronze tablet erected in 1933. The second meeting house in the district was built in 1728. It is known as the Grambrel Roof House. After the third meeting house was built, the Gambrel Roof House was used as a school and later was converted into an apartment building with five apartments. It is three stories constructed of stone.

The third meeting house was constructed in 1789 and is now used as a community center called the William Penn Center. In 1841 a fourth meeting house was built to the north of the Gambrel Roof House. This is the meeting house currently in use.
