= Oriental, Pennsylvania =

Unincorporated community in Pennsylvania, US

- Unincorporated community
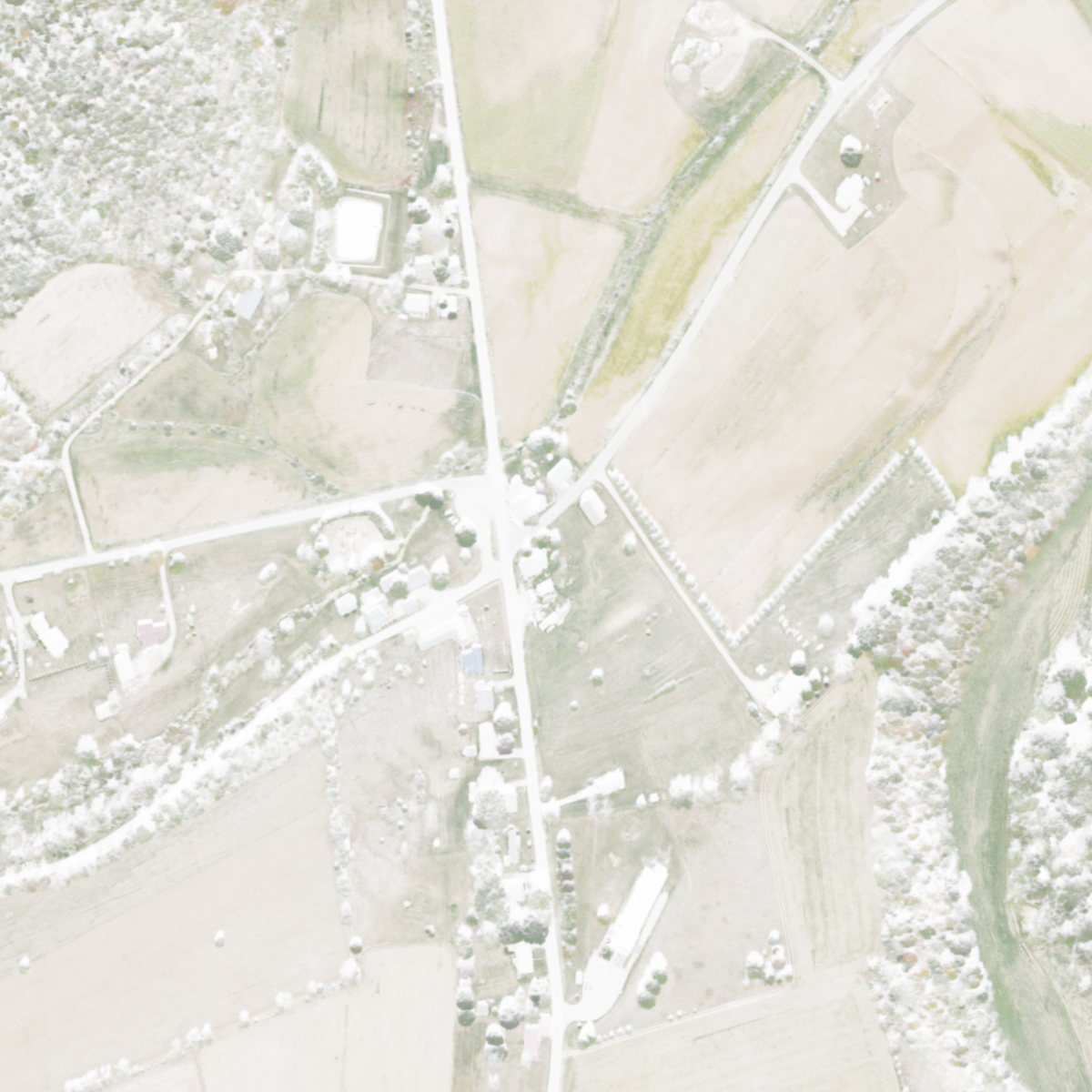
- 2019 Satellite image of Oriental, Pennsylvania

- Location within Pennsylvania Location within the United States
- Coordinates: 40°38′0″N 77°0′22″W
- Country: United States
- State: Pennsylvania
- County: Juniata
- Township: Susquehanna
- Elevation: 492 ft (150 m)
- Time zone: UTC-5 (Eastern (EST))
  - Summer (DST): UTC-4 (EDT)
- GNIS feature ID: 1183043

Oriental is an unincorporated community located within Susquehanna Township, Juniata County, Pennsylvania, United States. In 1855, settler Amos Miller started a store which operated for ten years, and a post office was established prior to the American Civil War. By 1910, the population was 130.
