= Tuscarora Academy =

- U.S. National Register of Historic Places
- Pennsylvania state historical marker
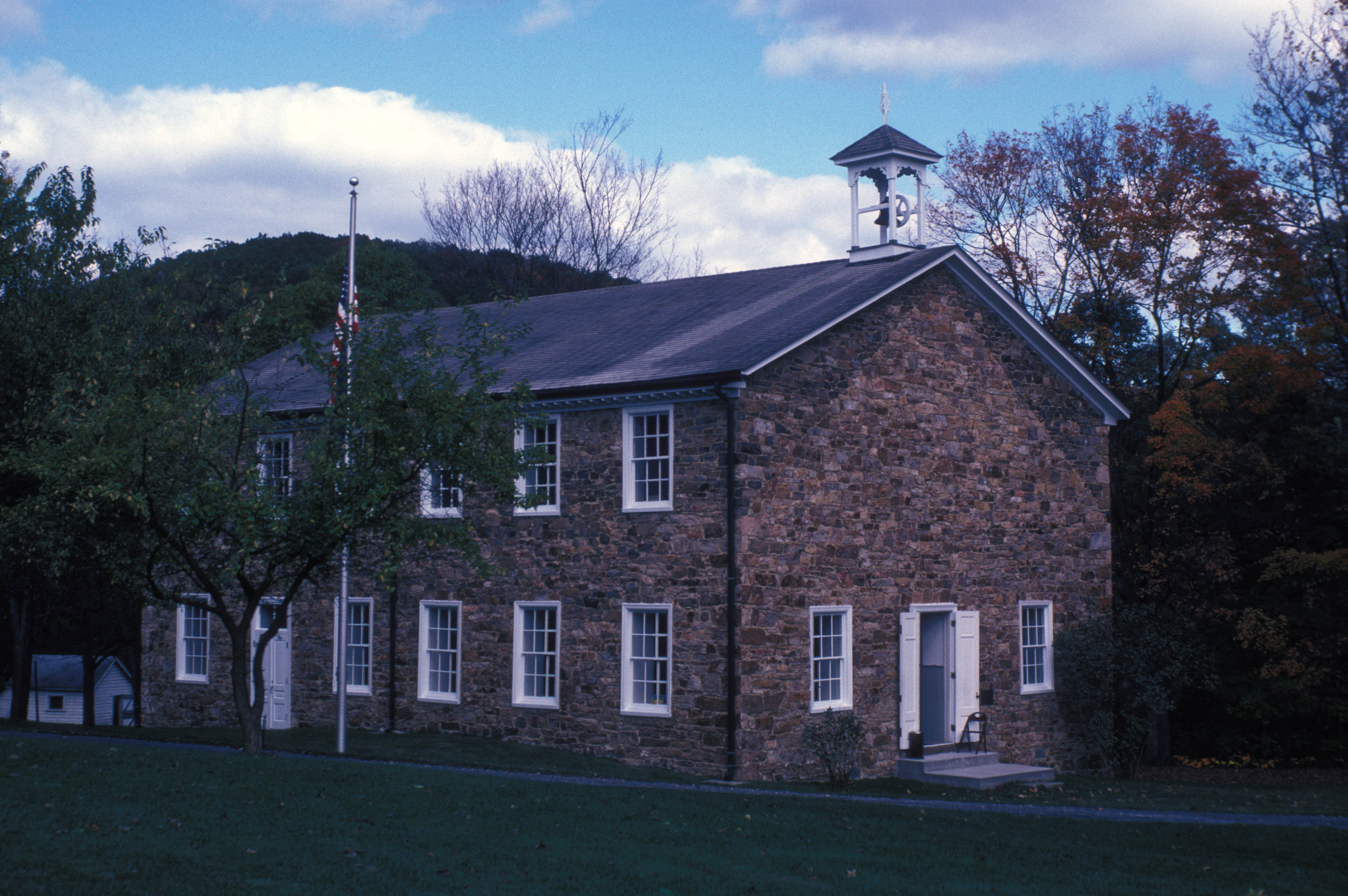

- Location within Pennsylvania Location within the United States
- Nearest city: Mifflintown, Pennsylvania
- Coordinates: 40°29′51″N 77°29′18″W
- Area: 1 acre (0.40 ha)
- Built: 1816
- NRHP reference No.: 72001125

Significant dates
- Added to NRHP: June 30, 1972
- Designated PHMC: March 20, 1968

The Tuscarora Academy in Academia, Pennsylvania is a building from 1816. It was listed on the National Register of Historic Places in 1972. The building was constructed in 1816 as a Presbyterian Church. When the Tuscarora Academy was established in 1836, some of the classes were held in the church. Other campus buildings were adjacent to the property. In 1850 the academy trustees purchased the building and added the second floor for extra dormitory rooms. From 1851 until 1875, four fires on campus destroyed the other campus buildings. Academy classes continued in this stone building until 1912, then until 1916 the building was used for Beale Township High School. Alumni and community members lobbied hard for the building's restoration and preservation, which finally happened starting in the 1960s. In August 1970, the Tuscarora Academy Museum opened to the public and is still operational today. In 2016, ownership was transferred to the Juniata County Historical Society. The Museum is open June through August on Sundays from 1:30pm until 4:00pm.

In addition to the notable alumni listed below, a book published in 2021 (Tuscarora Academy: Providence is Here) contains short biographies of about a third of the known alumni, faculty, and trustees. This once prestigious school educated young men (and women beginning in 1873) from at least 30 other states and 6 other countries. Alumni went on to settle in every state in the contiguous United States, with many reaching the pinnacle of their chosen professions.

The academy is located about a mile west of the Academia Pomeroy Covered Bridge which is also listed on the National Register.

== Notable alumni ==
- John L. Withrow, minister, author
- Captain James J. Patterson - instructor, Union army officer, author, and farmer
