= Selinsgrove, Pennsylvania =

Borough in Pennsylvania, United States

- Borough
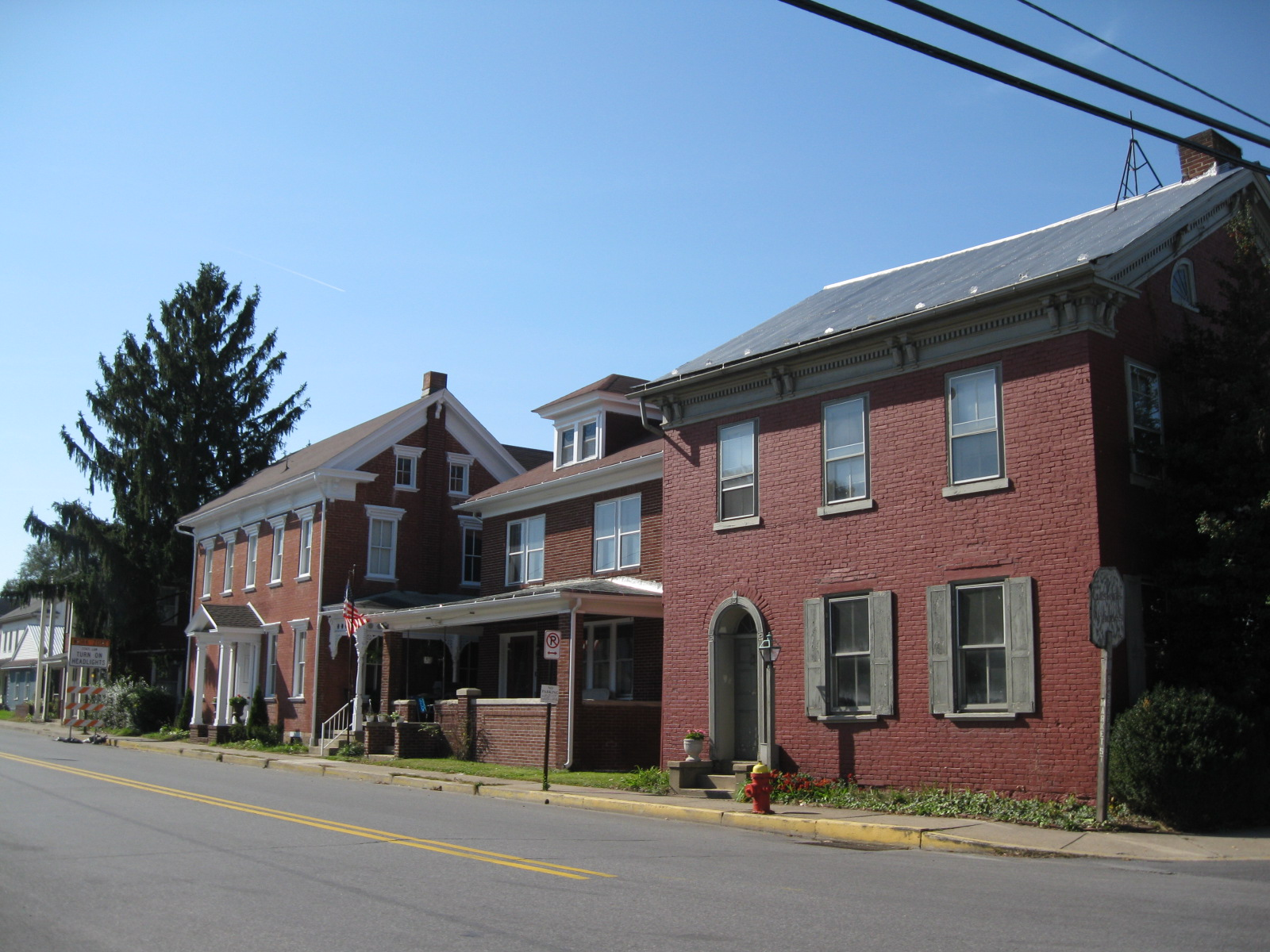
- Selinsgrove, Pennsylvania

- Seal
- Nickname: The Grove
- Location of Selinsgrove in Snyder County, Pennsylvania.

- Location within the U.S. state of Pennsylvania Selinsgrove (the United States)
- Coordinates: 40°48′09″N 76°51′47″W
- Country: United States
- State: Pennsylvania
- County: Snyder

Government
  - Mayor: Michael Bolig

Area
  - Total: 1.90 sq mi (4.92 km^{2})
  - Land: 1.83 sq mi (4.74 km^{2})
  - Water: 0.069 sq mi (0.18 km^{2}) 3.7%
- Elevation (borough benchmark): 443 ft (135 m)
- Highest elevation (southwest boundary of borough): 597 ft (182 m)
- Lowest elevation (Susquehanna River): 417 ft (127 m)

Population (2020)
  - Total: 5,713 ▲
  - Estimate (2021): 5,741
  - Density: 3,222.8/sq mi (1,244.33/km^{2})
- Time zone: UTC-5 (Eastern (EST))
  - Summer (DST): EDT
- ZIP code: 17870
- Area codes: 570 and 272
- FIPS code: 42-69216
- Website: Borough Website

Selinsgrove /ˈsiː.lɪnzˌɡroʊv/ is the largest borough in Snyder County, Pennsylvania, United States. The population is estimated to be 5,761 for the 2020 Census.

Selinsgrove is geographically located in the middle of the Susquehanna River Valley in Central Pennsylvania, along U.S. Routes 11 and 15, 45 miles north of Harrisburg and 5.7 miles (9.2 km) southwest of Sunbury. It is the home of Susquehanna University.

== History ==
Selinsgrove was founded in 1787 by Captain Anthony Selin, who fought in the American Revolution.

The Penns Creek Massacre on October 16, 1755 was the first of a series of deadly raids on Pennsylvania settlements by Native Americans allied with the French in the French and Indian War. A marker on the bank of Penns Creek north of Selinsgrove commemorates the massacre of 14 settlers and the capture of 11 more. In response to this and other Indian actions that day, Fort Augusta, Sunbury, Pennsylvania, the largest of Pennsylvania's frontier forts, was built in 1756 as a result of this conflict.

In 1872 and 1874, Selinsgrove suffered large fires which destroyed much of the original wooden buildings. the fire especially devastated the entire block bounded by Market, Pine, Water, and Walnut streets. Poor fire fighting facilities slowed the treatment by firemen, and the fire caused about $50,000 in damages.

The Sunbury and Selinsgrove electric streetcar network started operations in December 1907, running across a bridge in Shamokin Dam. Following the construction of the Penns Creek viaduct, the tracks reached Bridge Street.

Selinsgrove Hall and Seibert Hall at Susquehanna University and Gov. Simon Snyder Mansion on Market Street are listed on the National Register of Historic Places.

== Geography ==
According to the United States Census Bureau, the borough has a total area of 1.9 square miles (4.9 km^{2}). Selinsgrove borders the Susquehanna River. The portion of the borough that is located between Penns Creek and the Susquehanna River is known locally as the "Isle of Que" (pronounced queue).

=== Climate ===
Climate data for Selinsgrove, Pennsylvania (1991–2020 normals, extremes 1894–present)
Month	Jan	Feb	Mar	Apr	May	Jun	Jul	Aug	Sep	Oct	Nov	Dec	Year
Record high °F (°C)	72 (22)	77 (25)	87 (31)	94 (34)	96 (36)	100 (38)	105 (41)	105 (41)	100 (38)	92 (33)	80 (27)	73 (23)	105 (41)
Mean daily maximum °F (°C)	35.7 (2.1)	38.5 (3.6)	47.6 (8.7)	60.9 (16.1)	71.6 (22.0)	80.4 (26.9)	85.0 (29.4)	82.7 (28.2)	75.7 (24.3)	63.4 (17.4)	51.1 (10.6)	40.2 (4.6)	61.1 (16.2)
Daily mean °F (°C)	27.5 (−2.5)	29.5 (−1.4)	37.6 (3.1)	49.2 (9.6)	59.8 (15.4)	69.2 (20.7)	73.6 (23.1)	71.6 (22.0)	64.5 (18.1)	52.6 (11.4)	41.5 (5.3)	32.5 (0.3)	50.8 (10.4)
Mean daily minimum °F (°C)	19.4 (−7.0)	20.4 (−6.4)	27.5 (−2.5)	37.4 (3.0)	48.0 (8.9)	58.0 (14.4)	62.2 (16.8)	60.6 (15.9)	53.2 (11.8)	41.7 (5.4)	31.9 (−0.1)	24.9 (−3.9)	40.4 (4.7)
Record low °F (°C)	−27 (−33)	−22 (−30)	−11 (−24)	7 (−14)	23 (−5)	33 (1)	41 (5)	35 (2)	29 (−2)	16 (−9)	−5 (−21)	−11 (−24)	−27 (−33)
Average precipitation inches (mm)	3.07 (78)	2.30 (58)	3.26 (83)	3.68 (93)	3.76 (96)	4.38 (111)	4.29 (109)	3.78 (96)	4.41 (112)	3.88 (99)	3.05 (77)	3.24 (82)	43.10 (1,095)
Average snowfall inches (cm)	9.7 (25)	7.6 (19)	5.6 (14)	0.6 (1.5)	0.0 (0.0)	0.0 (0.0)	0.0 (0.0)	0.0 (0.0)	0.0 (0.0)	0.2 (0.51)	1.2 (3.0)	4.1 (10)	29.0 (74)
Average precipitation days (≥ 0.01 in)	12.2	9.6	11.3	12.3	12.9	11.7	11.0	10.9	9.9	10.6	10.0	10.8	133.2
Average snowy days (≥ 0.1 in)	5.0	4.1	2.4	0.4	0.0	0.0	0.0	0.0	0.0	0.1	0.7	2.7	15.4
Source: NOAA

== Demographics ==
Historical population
Census	Pop.	Note	%±
1860	1,261		—
1870	1,453		15.2%
1880	1,431		−1.5%
1890	1,315		−8.1%
1900	1,326		0.8%
1910	1,473		11.1%
1920	1,937		31.5%
1930	2,797		44.4%
1940	2,877		2.9%
1950	3,514		22.1%
1960	3,948		12.4%
1970	5,116		29.6%
1980	5,227		2.2%
1990	5,384		3.0%
2000	5,383		0.0%
2010	5,654		5.0%
2020	5,713		1.0%
2021 (est.)	5,741	▲	0.5%
U.S. Decennial Census

Selinsgrove is the principal city in the Selinsgrove, PA Micropolitan Statistical Area, and is also part of the larger Bloomsburg-Berwick-Sunbury, PA Combined Statistical Area.

As of the census of 2010, there were 5,654 people, 1,812 households, and 930 families residing in the borough. The population density was 2,976 inhabitants per square mile (1,149/km^{2}). There were 1,934 housing units, of which 122 were vacant. The racial makeup of the borough was 91.7% White, 3.4% Black or African American, 0.2% Native American, 1.2% Asian, 1.8% from "some other race," and 1.8% from two or more races. Hispanic or Latino of any race were 6.0% of the population. A majority of the Hispanic or Latino population was Mexican.

The presence of Susquehanna University strongly impacts the borough's demographics: 31.1% of the population lives in group quarters - largely dormitories - rather than in households. The student population is also visible in the disproportionate share of 18- to 24-year-olds.

Of the 1,812 households, 930 were families, 449 of which included related children under age 18. Among the families, 632 were husband-wife families, of which 231 had children at home. Only 92 households included 5 or more people.

Among the 882 non-family households, 404 were women living alone and 255 were men living alone. There were 1,760 people living in group quarters, of whom 153 were institutionalized. Among the non-institutionalized 1,607 living in group quarters - i.e. university students - 54% were female.

The borough's median age was 22.9 years. Due to the college, 39% of residents were age 18-24. Another 14% were under 18, 17% were 25-44, 16% were 45-64, and 14% were 65 and older.

Women make up the borough's majority, 53.6% of the population, implying that there are 86 men for every 100 women in Selinsgrove. Among those age 65 and older, 65% are women. The share of women is 52 or 53% for ages 18–24, 25-44, and 45-64. Among children, girls are 49% of the population.

According to the 2013-2017 American Community Survey, median income for a household in the borough was $47,500, and the median income for a family was $54,190. The unemployment rate for residents age 25-64 was 1.8% and the labor force participation rate was 84.1%. About 11% of families and 10% of the population (excluding students) were below the poverty line. However, income and poverty statistics for a community this small are reported with large margins of error and do not cover the student population.

== Economy ==
The largest local employers are housing-related manufacturers and educational institutions including the public schools and Susquehanna University. Educational services and health care/social assistance combined are projected to be about 90.7% of all job growth by 2014 in the central region. Manufacturing of both non-durable and durable goods are expected to lose over 4,000 jobs (a change of about -9.1% in employment) in the same time period. Construction is the only goods-producing sector projecting job growth, where employment may increase by about 210 jobs (or about 2.1%).

Outside of the community local region employment includes: service jobs in local businesses, area hospitals which include UPMC Susquehanna Sunbury in Sunbury and Evangelical Hospital in Lewisburg.

== Government ==
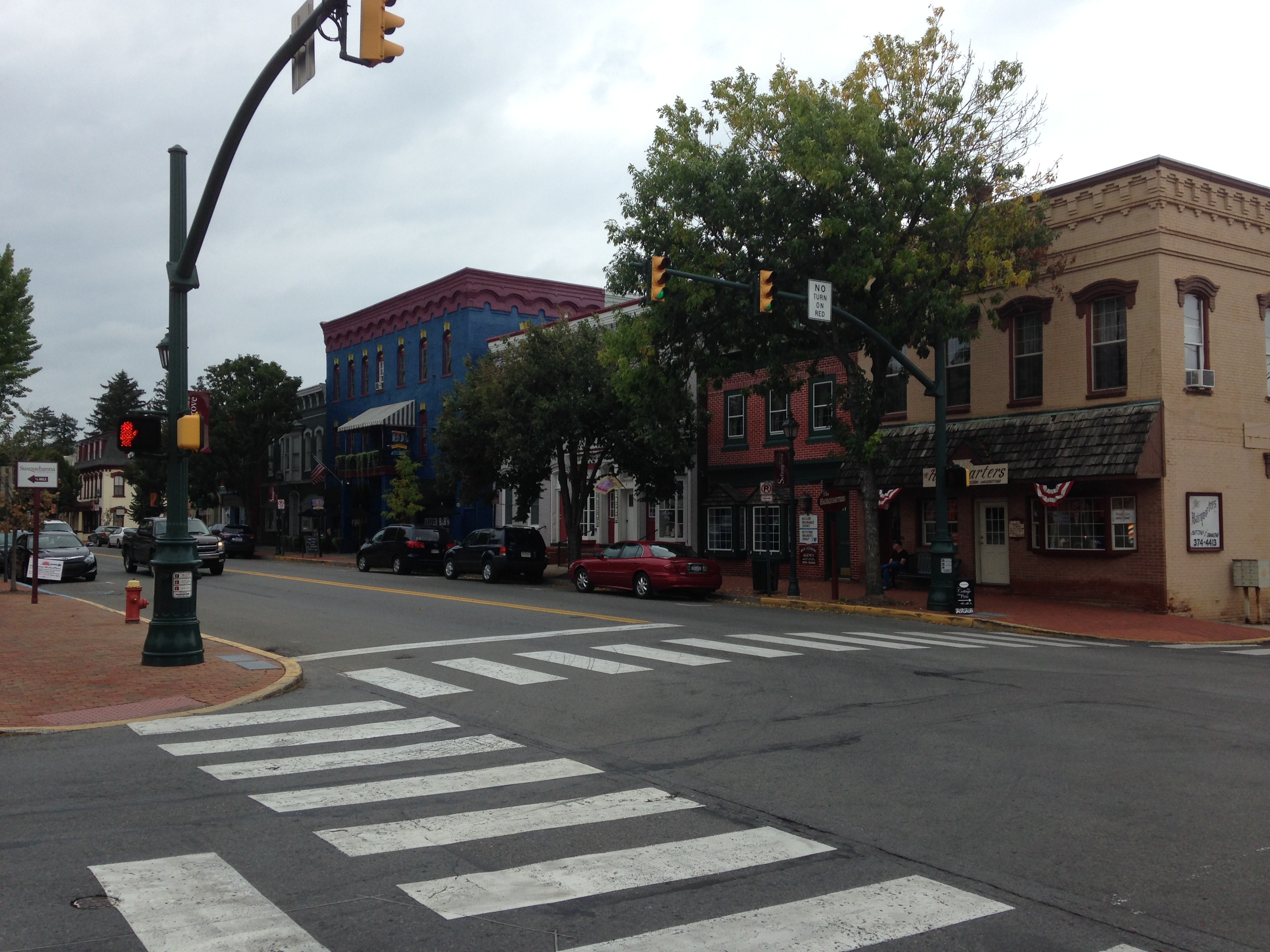
Downtown Market Street, looking northeast in Selinsgrove

The borough is governed by an elected council of seven residents. There is an elected mayor, a borough manager and a chief of police.

The borough council consists primarily of Democrats and Republicans, but members of the Green Party and Libertarian Party have also served.

Selinsgrove is located within the 85th Legislative District for the Pennsylvania General Assembly. Selinsgrove is also situated within The Pennsylvania Senate District 27, an office held by Senator Lynda Schlegel Culver. Selinsgrove is in the US House of Representatives 15th district, represented by Glenn Thompson.

== Transportation ==
US Routes 11, 15 and 522, along with PA Route 35 pass through Selinsgrove. Intercity bus service is provided between the borough and Harrisburg to the south and Williamsport and Elmira, New York to the north by Fullington Trailways.

== Education ==
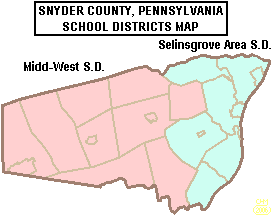
Map of Snyder County, Pennsylvania Public School Districts

Selinsgrove Area School District is the local public school system. The district operates four schools clustered on a campus located in Selinsgrove borough, including the Selinsgrove Area High School.

== Parks ==
Kidsgrove Park is a 3.25-acre neighborhood park maintained and operated by Kidsgrove, Inc. The park contains a large wooden play structure, universal swings and sandbox, a band shell, picnic pavilions and tables, accessible walking path and permanent restrooms that are open seasonally. Off-street parking is available.

Major Anthony Selin Park located on Sassafras Street is equipped with horseshoe, quoit, and basketball courts and soccer fields. A large covered pavilion for picnics can be reserved for outings and reunions. This facility also offers a kitchen area, restrooms, and game equipment. A “Life Trail”, which is a system of exercise and walking trails, is one feature of the park. Local businesses have donated kiosks that provide information on fitness for active adults. During the summer of 2011, this program offered a sport-camp atmosphere promoting physical activity. Activities will include soccer, baseball, lacrosse, volleyball, basketball, etc. A different sport was featured each week. The program consisted of fitness and sports activities.

Pump House Park and Gazebo The Pump House Park includes a building that can be rented for any meeting, party, or group event. This facility contains restrooms and a kitchen, as well as a meeting space that comfortably seats about 30 people and can be rearranged for as many as 60. The Gazebo is another great feature of the park, located in an attractive setting along Penns Creek. The Gazebo is a popular spot for outdoor weddings, and also hosts a concert series of local performers during June, July, and August. "Music at the Gazebo" is a program that runs from June through August with free concerts held in Pump House Park.

East Snyder Park is a multi-use facility which is under development using state grants and local donations. It is located along the upper end of University Ave. near Rt. 522, at the location of the existing Penn Township ball fields. The master plan of the park calls for nine professional grade horseshoe pits, baseball, softball, football and soccer fields, a preschool playground with age appropriate apparatus (Kaboom grant) a playground for older children, and a small wetland conservation education area.

Pennsylvania Fish and Boat Commission maintains boating access to the Susquehanna River on the Isle of Que.

Susquehanna Greenway is a regional effort to link natural, cultural, historic, and recreational resources along the 500-mile (800 km) corridor of the Susquehanna River in Pennsylvania.

A public swimming pool was built in the early 1970s.

== Community organizations ==
Selinsgrove Area Community Foundation (SACF) was founded in 1994 and is affiliated with the Central Susquehanna Community Foundation (CSCF). SAYF awards scholarships to Selinsgrove Area school students and has provided funding to community projects such as KidsGrove, the Selinsgrove Pool, Snyder County Library System, and improvements at the high school's Bolig football field and track fields.

The Selinsgrove Adult Band gives an annual spring concert utilizing school district facilities. This concert benefits the American Cancer Society.

In April 2016, a murder in Selinsgrove attracted international attention when 9-year-old Hilde Lysiak covered the story for her Orange Street News and was subsequently criticized because of her age and the subject of the story.

== Cemeteries ==
- Evergreen (Baker's)
- Saint Paul's United Church of Christ
- Trinity (English, New) Lutheran
- Sharon (German) Evangelical Lutheran
- Wagenseller's Union
- Old Lutheran Cemetery - The grave of three-term Pennsylvania Governor Simon Snyder is located here. .

== Notable people ==
- Benjamin Burnley of rock group Breaking Benjamin
- Jacob Coxey, socialist and populist politician
- Jim Davidson, actor and model, Selinsgrove High School alumni
- Aaron Fink, member of rock group Breaking Benjamin and Lifer
- Euell Gibbons, naturalist, died in Sunbury
- Jeremy Hummel of the rock group Breaking Benjamin
- Hilde Lysiak, journalist, editor and publisher of the Orange Street News, the only publication devoted exclusively to covering the events of Selinsgrove
- Matthew Lysiak nationally recognized journalist and Author currently resides in Selinsgrove
- Jeanne Shaheen, Governor of New Hampshire from 1997–2003; elected junior senator from New Hampshire in 2008.
- Simon Snyder, governor of Pennsylvania 1808-1817
- Amos Alonzo Stagg, football coach, served as an advisor at Susquehanna University from 1947 to 1952

== Popular culture ==
On April 30, 1988 the world's longest banana split was created in Selinsgrove. It was 7.32 kilometres (4.55 miles) long.
