= National Register of Historic Places listings in Lehigh County, Pennsylvania =

Location of Lehigh County in Pennsylvania

This is a list of the National Register of Historic Places listings in Lehigh County, Pennsylvania.

This is intended to be a complete list of the properties and districts on National Register of Historic Places in Lehigh County, Pennsylvania. The locations of National Register properties and districts for which the latitude and longitude coordinates are included below, may be seen in a map.

There are 60 properties and districts listed on the National Register in the county. One site is further designated as a National Historic Landmark. Another property was once listed but has been removed.

This National Park Service list is complete through NPS recent listings posted August 28, 2026.

== Current listings ==
	Name on the Register	Image	Date listed	Location	Municipality	Description
1	Allentown Masonic Temple	Allentown Masonic Temple	May 5, 2004 (#04000402)	1524 West Linden Street; 40°35′55″N 75°29′25″W	Allentown	
2	Allentown National Bank	Allentown National Bank	December 28, 2005 (#05001490)	13–17 N. 7th Street; 40°36′17″N 75°28′17″W	Allentown	
3	Americus Hotel	Americus Hotel	August 23, 1984 (#84003454)	541 Hamilton Street; 40°36′10″N 75°28′12″W	Allentown	
4	Bethlehem Armory	Bethlehem Armory	November 14, 1991 (#91001693)	301 Prospect Street; 40°37′09″N 75°23′16″W	Bethlehem	
5	Biery's Port Historic District	Biery's Port Historic District	August 9, 1984 (#84003457)	Roughly bounded by Pineapple, Front, Race, and Mulberry streets 40°38′57″N 75°28′04″W	Catasauqua	
6	Bogert Covered Bridge	Bogert Covered Bridge	December 1, 1980 (#80003552)	South of Allentown on Legislative Route 39016 in Little Lehigh Park; 40°34′08″N 75°30′17″W	Allentown	
7	Bridge in Heidelberg Township	Bridge in Heidelberg Township	June 22, 1988 (#88000765)	Legislative Route 39110 over a branch of Jordan Creek; 40°42′03″N 75°42′37″W	Heidelberg Township	
8	Burnside Plantation	Burnside Plantation	May 2, 1990 (#90000705)	Schoenersville Road 2 miles (3.2 km) southeast of its junction with Easton Avenue; 40°37′51″N 75°23′22″W	Bethlehem	
9	Catasauqua Residential Historic District	Catasauqua Residential Historic District	May 10, 1984 (#84003465)	Roughly bounded by Howertown Road, Railroad Avenue, Oak, and Bridge streets 40°39′19″N 75°28′25″W	Catasauqua	
10	Centennial Bridge	Centennial Bridge	June 22, 1988 (#88000772)	Station Avenue over Saucon Creek; 40°31′43″N 75°23′31″W	Center Valley	
11	Central Bethlehem Historic District	Central Bethlehem Historic District	May 5, 1972 (#72001131)	Bounded by Main, Nevada, and East Broad Streets, and the Lehigh River; 40°37′06″N 75°22′56″W	Bethlehem	Extends into Northampton County
12	Cold Spring Bridge	Cold Spring Bridge	June 22, 1988 (#88000874)	2nd Street over Spring Creek; 40°42′03″N 75°31′01″W	North Whitehall and Whitehall Townships	
13	Coopersburg Historic District	Coopersburg Historic District	April 26, 1982 (#82003798)	Main Street and Pennsylvania Route 309; 40°30′32″N 75°23′23″W	Coopersburg	
14	Coplay Cement Company Kilns	Coplay Cement Company Kilns	September 2, 1980 (#80003556)	North 2nd Street; 40°40′34″N 75°29′42″W	Coplay	
15	Dent Hardware Company Factory Complex	Dent Hardware Company Factory Complex	August 21, 1986 (#86001772)	1101 3rd Street, Fullerton; 40°38′24″N 75°28′30″W	Whitehall Township	
16	Dillingersville Union School and Church	Dillingersville Union School and Church	October 25, 1979 (#79002290)	East of Zionsville on Zionsville Road; 40°28′26″N 75°29′17″W	Lower Milford Township	
17	Dime Savings and Trust Company	Dime Savings and Trust Company	January 3, 1985 (#85000036)	12 North 7th Street; 40°36′08″N 75°28′22″W	Allentown	
18	Dorneyville Crossroad Settlement	Dorneyville Crossroad Settlement	December 7, 1977 (#77001172)	South of Allentown at the junction of U.S. Route 222 and Pennsylvania Route 29; 40°34′48″N 75°31′19″W	South Whitehall Township	
19	The 1803 House	The 1803 House	November 7, 2003 (#03001123)	55 South Keystone Avenue; 40°32′23″N 75°29′11″W	Emmaus	Historic federal-style home built in 1803
20	Fireman's Drinking Fountain	Fireman's Drinking Fountain	November 9, 1981 (#81000551)	Main Street; 40°45′06″N 75°36′48″W	Slatington	
21	Fountain Hill Historic District	Fountain Hill Historic District	April 21, 1988 (#88000450)	Roughly bounded by Brighton, Wyandotte, W. 4th, and Seminole Streets, and Delaware Avenue; 40°36′40″N 75°23′10″W	Bethlehem	Extends into Northampton County
22	Frantz's Bridge	Frantz's Bridge	June 22, 1988 (#88000771)	Legislative Route 39060 over Jordan Creek; 40°39′03″N 75°39′02″W	Lowhill Township	Replaced with a concrete bridge in 2011
23	Gauff-Roth House	Gauff-Roth House	September 5, 1985 (#85001966)	427–443 Auburn Street; 40°35′46″N 75°27′52″W	Allentown	
24	Geiger Covered Bridge	Geiger Covered Bridge	December 1, 1980 (#80003558)	Southwest of Schnecksville on Old Packhouse Road; 40°38′46″N 75°37′00″W	North Whitehall Township	
25	Haines Mill	Haines Mill	September 11, 1981 (#81000548)	Walnut Street and Main Boulevard; 40°35′06″N 75°31′56″W	South Whitehall Township	
26	Helfrich's Springs Grist Mill	Helfrich's Springs Grist Mill	October 14, 1977 (#77001174)	West of Fullerton on Mickley Road; 40°37′31″N 75°29′29″W	Whitehall Township	
27	High German Evangelical Reformed Church	High German Evangelical Reformed Church	July 28, 1983 (#83002259)	620 Hamilton Street; 40°36′09″N 75°28′14″W	Allentown	Also known as Zion Reformed Church
28	Hokendauqua Thomas Iron Company Town Historic District	Hokendauqua Thomas Iron Company Town Historic District	September 19, 2022 (#100008170)	Roughly bounded by Front, Center, Carbon, Vine, and South Sts. 40°39′44″N 75°29′23″W	Whitehall	
29	Hotel Sterling	Hotel Sterling	May 3, 1984 (#84003469)	343–345 Hamilton Street; 40°36′19″N 75°27′43″W	Allentown	
30	Kemmerer House	Kemmerer House	September 14, 1977 (#77001173)	3 Iroquois Street; 40°32′54″N 75°29′57″W	Emmaus	
31	Kistler Residence	Kistler Residence	August 6, 2021 (#100006785)	315-317 North 7th St. 40°36′25″N 75°28′26″W	Allentown	
32	Heinrich Knauss House	Heinrich Knauss House	June 10, 2008 (#08000521)	152 E. Main St. 40°32′40″N 75°29′03″W	Emmaus	
33	Frederick and Catherine Leaser Farm	Frederick and Catherine Leaser Farm	January 14, 2004 (#03001420)	7654 Leaser Road; 40°40′32″N 75°50′47″W	Lynn Township	Homestead of Frederick Leaser, who transported the Liberty Bell to Zion Reformed Church in 1777
34	Lehigh Canal	Lehigh Canal	August 15, 1980 (#80003553)	Walnutport to Allentown Section; 40°42′08″N 75°31′52″W	Allentown	Extends into Northampton County
35	Lehigh Canal; Allentown to Hopeville Section	Lehigh Canal; Allentown to Hopeville Section	December 17, 1979 (#79002307)	Along the Lehigh River; 40°36′55″N 75°24′52″W	Allentown	
36	Linden Grove Pavilion	Linden Grove Pavilion	November 30, 1979 (#79002289)	Linden and South Main streets 40°30′18″N 75°23′35″W	Coopersburg	
37	Lock Ridge Furnace Complex	Lock Ridge Furnace Complex	September 11, 1981 (#81000547)	Franklin and Church Streets; 40°30′32″N 75°35′39″W	Alburtis	
38	Manasses Guth Covered Bridge	Manasses Guth Covered Bridge	December 1, 1980 (#80003559)	West of Greenawalds on Township 602; 40°37′42″N 75°33′13″W	South Whitehall Township	
39	Martin Tower	Martin Tower	June 28, 2010 (#10000401)	1170 8th Ave. 40°37′54″N 75°23′40″W	Bethlehem	Imploded on May 20, 2019.
40	Albertus L. Meyers Bridge	Albertus L. Meyers Bridge	June 22, 1988 (#88000870)	8th Street over Little Lehigh and Railroad Streets; 40°35′45″N 75°28′16″W	Allentown	
41	Mount Airy Historic District	Mount Airy Historic District	May 9, 1988 (#88000453)	Roughly Prospect Avenue between 15th and 8th Avenues; 40°37′12″N 75°24′09″W	Bethlehem	
42	Neuweiler Brewery	Neuweiler Brewery	June 27, 1980 (#80003554)	401 North Front Street; 40°36′40″N 75°27′29″W	Allentown	
43	Nineteenth Street Theater	Nineteenth Street Theater	February 12, 2024 (#100009917)	527 N. Nineteenth Street; 40°36′12″N 75°29′59″W	Allentown	
44	Old Lehigh County Courthouse	Old Lehigh County Courthouse	September 11, 1981 (#81000550)	5th and Hamilton streets 40°36′13″N 75°28′04″W	Allentown	
45	The President Engine House and Ueberroth Zinc Mine		June 5, 2026 (#100012826)	On Old Bethlehem Pike (Township Road T835), 1,000 feet (300 m) south of its intersection with Center Valley Parkway (State Road 2044); Entrance on the right side of the road 40°33′56″N 75°23′46″W	Upper Saucon Township	
46	Rex Covered Bridge	Rex Covered Bridge	December 1, 1980 (#80003560)	South of Schencksville on Township 593; 40°38′05″N 75°36′47″W	North Whitehall Township	
47	Rodale Organic Gardening Experimental Farm	Rodale Organic Gardening Experimental Farm	May 12, 1999 (#99000515)	2056 Minesite Road; 40°33′17″N 75°31′20″W	Lower Macungie Township	
48	Schlicher Covered Bridge	Schlicher Covered Bridge	December 1, 1980 (#80003555)	Legislative Route 39058 near Allentown; 40°39′42″N 75°37′38″W	North Whitehall Township	
49	George F. Schlicher Hotel	George F. Schlicher Hotel	May 7, 1992 (#92000396)	105–107 South Main Street; 40°30′43″N 75°36′12″W	Alburtis	
50	Schubert-Graber Log-Post Shop	Schubert-Graber Log-Post Shop	February 4, 2019 (#100003247)	6561 Powder Valley Rd. 40°28′23″N 75°31′27″W	Upper Milford Township	
51	Shelter House	Shelter House	February 17, 1978 (#78002426)	South 4th Street; 40°31′50″N 75°29′06″W	Emmaus	
52	Slatington Historic District	Slatington Historic District	August 11, 2004 (#04000839)	Roughly bounded by Ridge Alley, Chesnut Street, Railroad Street, Kern Street, Hill Alley, 5th Street, and Dowell; 40°44′54″N 75°36′43″W	Slatington	
53	George Taylor House	George Taylor House	July 17, 1971 (#71000709)	Front Street; 40°38′52″N 75°27′59″W	Catasauqua	
54	Trout Hall	Trout Hall	November 14, 1978 (#78002425)	414 Walnut Street; 40°36′09″N 75°27′50″W	Allentown	
55	Troxell-Steckel House	Troxell-Steckel House	June 27, 1980 (#80003557)	4229 Reliance Street; 40°40′32″N 75°32′08″W	Egypt	
56	Valley of Allentown Scottish Rite Cathedral	Valley of Allentown Scottish Rite Cathedral	January 10, 2025 (#100011246)	1533 Hamilton Street; 40°35′51″N 75°29′22″W	Allentown	Adjoins Allentown Masonic Temple to the north
57	Vigilant Fire Company Firemen's Monument	Vigilant Fire Company Firemen's Monument	August 11, 2004 (#04000838)	Union Cemetery, west side of Pennsylvania Route 873, approximately 1/3 mile (0.5 km) south of Slatington; 40°44′23″N 75°36′49″W	Washington Township	
58	Valentine Weaver House	Valentine Weaver House	June 28, 1984 (#84003482)	146 South Church Street; 40°30′40″N 75°33′21″W	Macungie	
59	Wehr Covered Bridge	Wehr Covered Bridge	December 1, 1980 (#80003561)	West of Greenawald on Township 597; 40°34′08″N 75°30′17″W	South Whitehall Township	
60	Zollinger-Harned Company Building	Zollinger-Harned Company Building	December 17, 1979 (#79002288)	605–613 Hamilton Mall and 14016 North 6th Street; 40°36′10″N 75°28′14″W	Allentown	

== Former listings ==
	Name on the Register	Image	Date listed	Date removed	Location	Municipality	Description
1	Bridge in Lynn Township	Bridge in Lynn Township	June 22, 1988 (#88000822)	March 21, 2003	Legislative Route 39112 over Ontelaunee Creek9Original location. Now located at:); 40°18′17″N 76°56′02″W	Steinsville	Relocated to Central Penn College campus on May 6, 2002.
2	Lehigh County Prison	Lehigh County Prison	September 11, 1981 (#81000549)	August 24, 1998	4th and Linden Sts.	Allentown	
3	Nonnemaker House	Nonnemaker House	January 25, 1971 (#73002281)	August 6, 1973	301 S. Lehigh St.	Allentown	Demolished in February, 1973.

== See also ==
- List of National Historic Landmarks in Pennsylvania
- List of Pennsylvania state historical markers in Lehigh County
- National Register of Historic Places listings in Pennsylvania
