= Mount Airy Historic District =

Mount Airy Historic District can refer to:

- Mount Airy Historic District (Mount Airy, Maryland), listed on the NRHP in Maryland
- Mount Airy Historic District (Mount Airy, North Carolina), listed on the NRHP in North Carolina
- Mount Airy Historic District (Lambertville, New Jersey), listed on the NRHP in New Jersey
- Mount Airy Historic District (Bethlehem, Pennsylvania), listed on the NRHP in Pennsylvania

== See also ==
- Mount Airy (disambiguation)
