= Burnside Plantation =

Burnside Plantation may refer to:

- Burnside Plantation (Bethlehem, Pennsylvania), listed on the NRHP in Pennsylvania
- Burnside Plantation House (Williamsboro, North Carolina), listed on the NRHP in North Carolina
- The Houmas, also known as Burnside Plantation, in Burnside, Louisiana
