= Guerber Engineering =

American engineering company

Guerber Engineering Co.
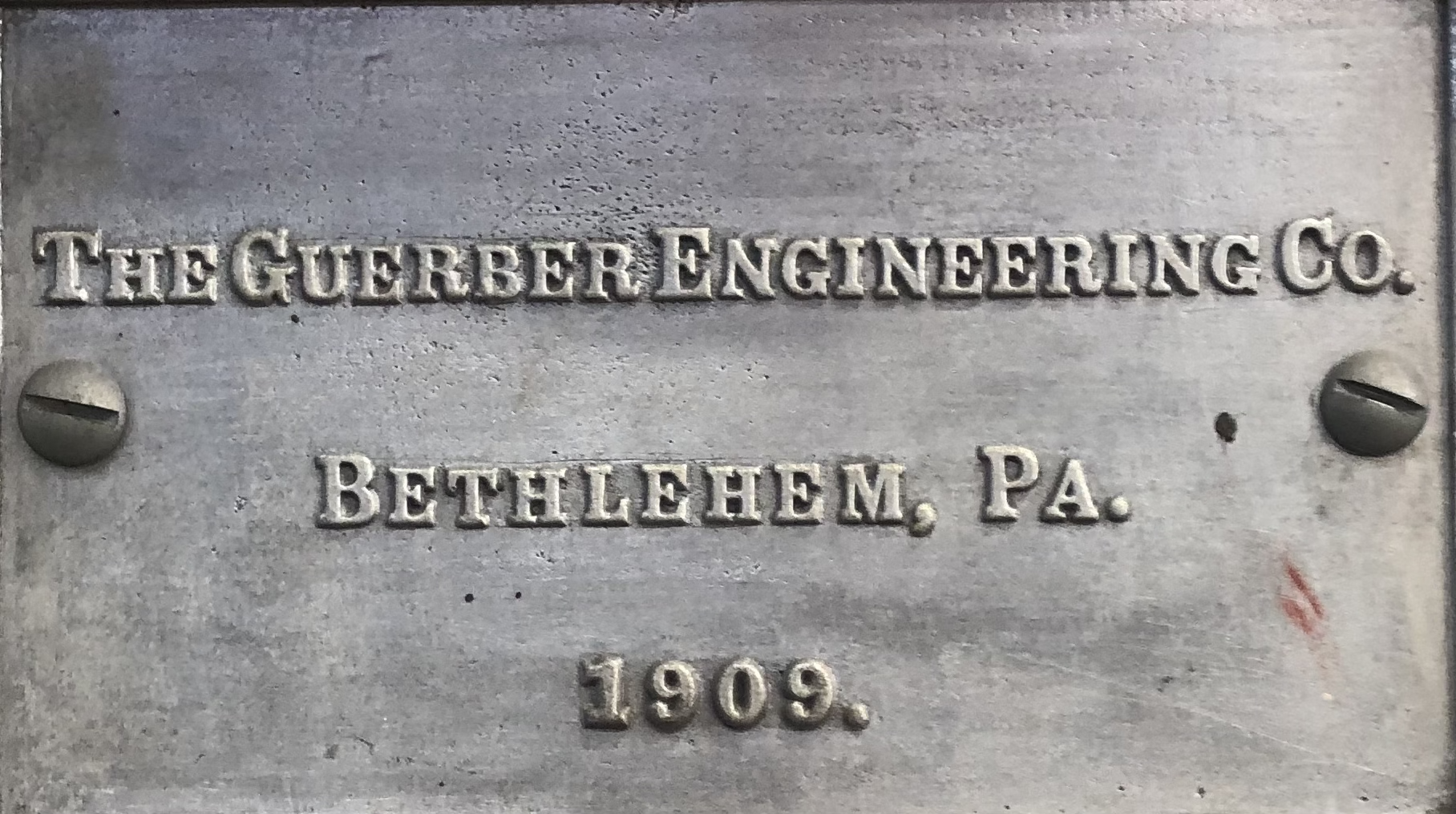
- Guerber's logo in Fritz Lab
- Industry: Civil engineering
- Founded: 1901
- Founder: Paul A. E. Guerber
- Defunct: 1981; 44 years ago
- Fate: Absorbed by Lewis Industries, Inc.
- Headquarters: West Bethlehem, Pennsylvania, United States
- Area served: Lehigh Valley
- Key people: William B. M. Hutchinson; Morris J. Dimmick
- Products: Structural engineering Steel

The Guerber Engineering Co. was a civil engineering firm that served most of the Lehigh Valley during the first half of the 20th century, erecting many of the steel elements of most notable buildings in the valley during this time period.

== History ==
The company was established in 1901 by Paul A. E. Guerber, a mechanical engineer and graduate of the Stevens Institute of Technology operating originally out of Allentown, Pennsylvania before moving to West Bethlehem. In 1913, William B. M. Hutchinson was named president and chairman of Guerber Engineering. Hutchinson would transform the company into Bethlehem Fabricators, Inc. in the early 1930s, no longer offering structural engineering services nor structural steel elements, instead focusing on the production of gas‐fired heaters and other metal products. The company, both under Guerber and Hutchinson's tenure had a close connection with Lehigh University, with Hutchinson being an alumnus. As such many recent Lehigh graduates in the early 20th century were employed upon graduation by the firm. Morris J. Dimmick served as the company's vice president from the 1930s to his retirement in 1960.

Bethlehem Fabricators would be purchased and merged into Lewis Industries, Inc. in 1981. Lewis Industries is a local industrial conglomerate that at the time began to move into the steel fabrication industry. However, by 1984, the former Bethlehem Fabricators plant would be shuttered as part of the wider Rust Belt with 335 people losing their jobs.

== Notable projects ==
- Lehigh University's Fritz Lab erecting their structural steel in 1909, the lab would be the future home of the school's civil engineering department and Guerber was commemorated with a plaque.
- Glendon Hill Road Canal Bridge constructed in 1910. The historic bridge spans the Lehigh Canal in Easton, Pennsylvania.
- Allentown National Bank constructed in 1905, a National Historic Landmark.
