= List of Pennsylvania state historical markers in Lehigh County =

Location of Lehigh County in Pennsylvania

This is a list of the Pennsylvania state historical markers in Lehigh County.

This is intended to be a complete list of the official state historical markers placed in Lehigh County, Pennsylvania by the Pennsylvania Historical and Museum Commission (PHMC). The locations of the historical markers, as well as the latitude and longitude coordinates as provided by the PHMC's database, are included below when available. There are 29 historical markers located in Lehigh County.

== Historical markers ==
Marker title	Image	Date dedicated	Location	Marker type	Topics
Abraham Blumer - PLAQUE		November 1, 1929	On grounds of Jordan United Church of Christ at Walbert, South Whitehall Twp. 40.61352°N 75.567°W	Plaque	American Revolution, Ethnic & Immigration, Military, Religion
Allentown		September 3, 1947	S 4th St. (PA 145), just S of W Mountain Rd., Allentown	Roadside	Business & Industry, Cities & Towns, Government & Politics 18th Century
Allentown		September 3, 1947	MacArthur Rd. (PA 145) at N city line, just N of Sumner Ave. overpass, Allentown	Roadside	American Revolution, Business & Industry, Cities & Towns, Government & Politics
Allentown		September 3, 1947	Tilghman St. (old US 22) at 30th St., Allentown; 40.6164°N 75.50678°W	Roadside	American Revolution, Business & Industry, Cities & Towns, Government & Politics
Allentown		September 3, 1947	N 19th St. at Roth Ave., Allentown	Roadside	American Revolution, Business & Industry, Cities & Towns, Government & Politics
Allentown		September 3, 1947	U.S. 309 South at Allentown	Roadside	American Revolution, Business & Industry, Cities & Towns, Government & Politics
Biery's Port		April 24, 1988	Corner Race & Lehigh Sts., Catasauqua	City	Business & Industry, Cities & Towns, Coal, Iron, Mills
Crane Iron Works		May 4, 1997	Front St. between Church & Wood Sts., Catasauqua; 40.65208°N 75.47287°W	City	Business & Industry, Coal, Furnaces, Iron
David Thomas		May 20, 2001	Pine Street, Catasauqua; 40.6551°N 75.47443°W	City	Business & Industry, Coal, Entrepreneurs, Ethnic & Immigration, Iron
Dery Silk Mill		October 18, 1998	101 Race Street, Catasauqua; 40.64917°N 75.4677°W	City	Buildings, Business & Industry, Mills
Emmaus		July 26, 1966	Main St. at library, Emmaus; 40.54103°N 75.48653°W	Roadside	Cities & Towns, Early Settlement, Native American, Religion
First Cement		September 2, 1947	Opposite Coplay Cement office bldg. at Coplay; 40.67617°N 75.498°W	Roadside	Business & Industry
First School Slate Factory		October 23, 2003	Main and Factory Sts., Slatington; 40.75247°N 75.60805°W	City	Business & Industry, Education
Fort Deshler		October 7, 2001	Pa. 145 at Ironton Rail Trail; 40.67227°N 75.51608°W	Roadside	Forts, French & Indian War, Military
Fort Everett		August 21, 1951	Pa. 143 E of Lynnport; 40.67713°N 75.80095°W	Roadside	Forts, French & Indian War, Military
Frederick Leaser - PLAQUE		November 1, 1928	Leaser Lake Park off PA 143 via Pleasure Ct. (at end of parking lot at flag pole), Jacksonville; 40.67078°N 75.83333°W	Plaque	American Revolution
George Taylor (1716-1781)		n/a	Lehigh St. just S of Race St., Catasaqua; 40.64708°N 75.46683°W	City	Government & Politics, Government & Politics 18th Century, Iron
Harriet A. Baker		May 4, 1990	410 Union St., Allentown; 40.60095°N 75.4641°W	City	African American, Religion, Women
Indian Jasper Quarries		October 23, 1952	SR 2027 near intersection SR 2023, Vera Cruz; 40.50732°N 75.49672°W	City	Business & Industry, Native American
Lehigh County		October 30, 1982	Old Courthouse, 5th & Hamilton Sts., Allentown; 40.60333°N 75.46803°W	City	Government & Politics, Government & Politics 19th Century
Lock Ridge Iron Furnace		September 7, 2009	at Presbyterian church, 407 Franklin St. (at Church St.), Alburtis; 40.5093°N 75.5982°W	Roadside	Coal, Furnaces, Iron
Portland Cement		November 4, 1947	Iron Run Indus. Park., Tilghman St. (old U.S. 22), just W of Mill Rd. / Windsor Dr. intersection, W of Kuhnsville	Roadside	Business & Industry
Samuel Wetherill (1821-1890)		September 23, 2003	North side of Columbia between Webster and Adams Sts., Bethlehem; 40.61262°N 75.37651°W	City	Business & Industry, Civil War, Invention, Medicine & Science, Military
Slate Industry		April 23, 2002	Intersection of Main and Railroad Streets, Slatington; 40.75298°N 75.60452°W	Roadside	Business & Industry, Entrepreneurs, Ethnic & Immigration
Stephen Vincent Benet		May 7, 1960	NE corner, Ostrum & Bishopthorpe Sts., Fountain Hill; 40.60715°N 75.39382°W	City	Writers
Trout Hall		January 24, 1967	S. 4th St. near walnut St., Allentown; 40.60195°N 75.46467°W	Roadside	Education, Government & Politics, Government & Politics 18th Century, Mansions & Manors, Religion
Troxell-Steckel House		November 2, 1970	Main St. (PA 329) at Reliance St, beside church parking lot, Egypt; 40.68092°N 75.52908°W	Roadside	Buildings, Early Settlement, Houses & Homesteads
Troxell-Steckel House		November 2, 1970	S Church St. (Rt. 1023) near Bridge St., Egypt; 40.67923°N 75.52917°W	Roadside	Buildings, Early Settlement, Houses & Homesteads
Trucker's Mill		January 11, 1952	Main St. (Pa. 873) near Diamond St., Slatington; 40.75278°N 75.61043°W	City	Forts, French & Indian War, Military, Mills, Roads

== See also ==
- List of Pennsylvania state historical markers
- National Register of Historic Places listings in Lehigh County, Pennsylvania
