= Hotel Sterling (Allentown, Pennsylvania) =

- U.S. National Register of Historic Places
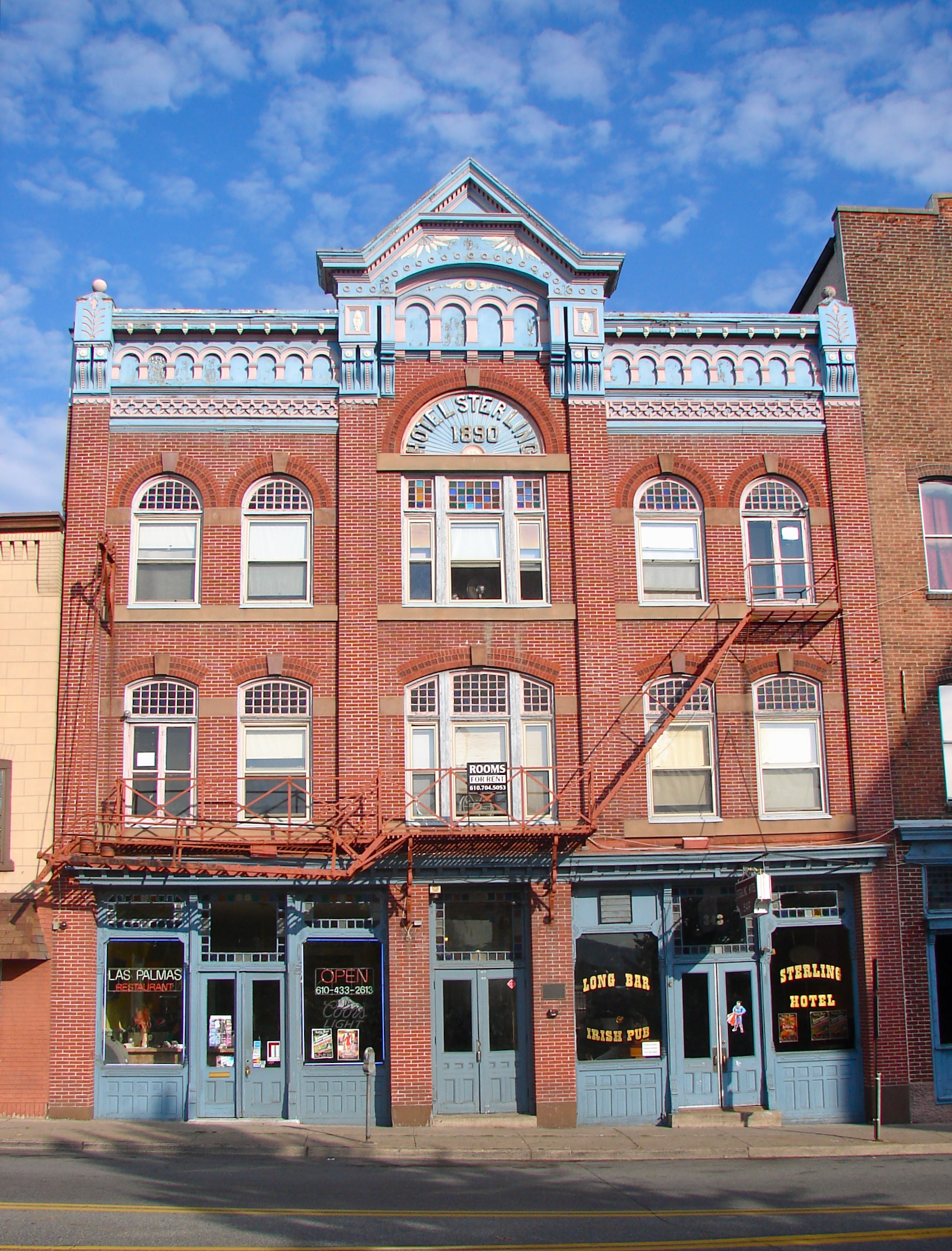
- Hotel Sterling in Allentown, Pennsylvania in October 2011

- Location within Pennsylvania Location within the United States
- Location: 343–345 West Hamilton Street, Allentown, Pennsylvania, U.S.
- Coordinates: 40°36′19″N 75°27′43″W
- Area: 0.1 acres (0.040 ha)
- Built: 1899–1890
- Architectural style: Queen Anne, Romanesque, Eastlake
- NRHP reference No.: 84003469
- Added to NRHP: May 3, 1984

The Hotel Sterling is an historic hotel, which is located in Allentown, Pennsylvania. Built between 1889 and 1890, it is a three-story rectangular brick building that was designed in the Romanesque Revival style with Queen Anne and Eastlake influences.

It was subsequently added to the National Register of Historic Places in 1984.

== History and architectural features ==
The Hotel Sterling is three bays wide, with a gabled parapet at the middle bay. When nominated for the National Register of Historic Places in 1980, it had 33 sleeping rooms.

The hotel was built simultaneously with the Central Railroad of New Jersey and Lehigh Valley Railroad stations. Situated directly across Hamilton Street, the proximity of the hotel and stations provided travelers with convenient places to eat and stay in Allentown. With the end of passenger rail service in the 1960s, the hotel was adapted to other uses.

The hotel is used as the venue for the Deja Vu nightclub, which features live music acts. On June 20, 2019, it became the site of shootout between two rival gangs, the Bloods and Latin Kings, in which ten people were shot.

== See also ==
- List of historic places in Allentown, Pennsylvania
