= Lehigh County Prison =

- Formerly listed on the U.S. National Register of Historic Places
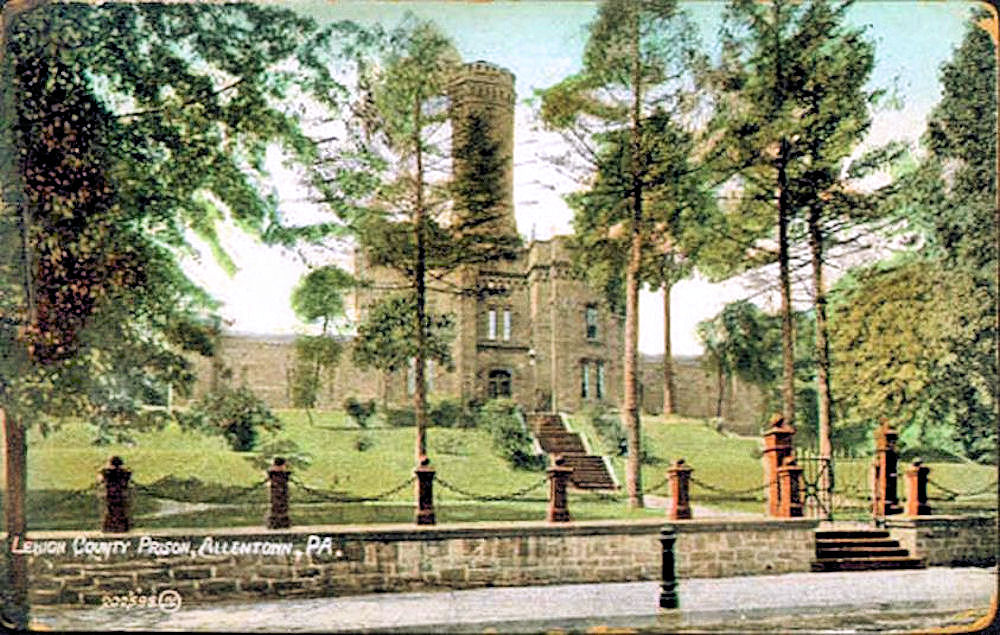
- Lehigh County Prison on a 1915 postcard
- Location: 4th and Linden Sts., Allentown, Pennsylvania, U.S.
- Area: 2.1 acres (0.85 ha)
- Built: 1869
- Architect: G.A. Aschbach
- Architectural style: Gothic, Norman Gothic revival
- NRHP reference No.: 81000549

Significant dates
- Added to NRHP: 1981
- Removed from NRHP: August 24, 1998

Lehigh County Prison was a historic county courthouse located at Allentown, Lehigh County, Pennsylvania. It was built in 1869.

It was added to the National Register of Historic Places in 1981 and delisted in 1998, after being demolished.
