= Coopersburg Historic District =

Historic district in Pennsylvania, United States

- U.S. National Register of Historic Places
- U.S. Historic district

- Location within Pennsylvania Location within the United States
- Location: Main St. and PA 309, Coopersburg, Pennsylvania
- Coordinates: 40°39′19″N 75°28′25″W
- Area: 93 acres (38 ha)
- Built: 1750
- Architect: Jordan, Genaah; Et al.
- Architectural style: Colonial Revival, Queen Anne, Federal
- NRHP reference No.: 82003798
- Added to NRHP: April 26, 1982

Coopersburg Historic District is a national historic district located at Coopersburg, Lehigh County, Pennsylvania. The district includes 175 contributing buildings in the central business district and surrounding residential areas of Coopersburg.

It was added to the National Register of Historic Places in 1982.

== Background ==
The buildings are in a variety of architectural styles including Colonial Revival, Queen Anne, and Federal styles. Notable buildings include the Norcross House (1790), Barron House (social hall of the Coopersburg Fire Company), Odd Fellows' Hall, Baldwin House hotel (1856), Gander (or Boye) House, the Cooper Estate, Coopersburg Elementary School (1909), First National Bank of Coopersburg (1920), and Congreve House. Located in the district is the separately listed Linden Grove Pavilion.
