= Allentown National Bank =

- U.S. National Register of Historic Places
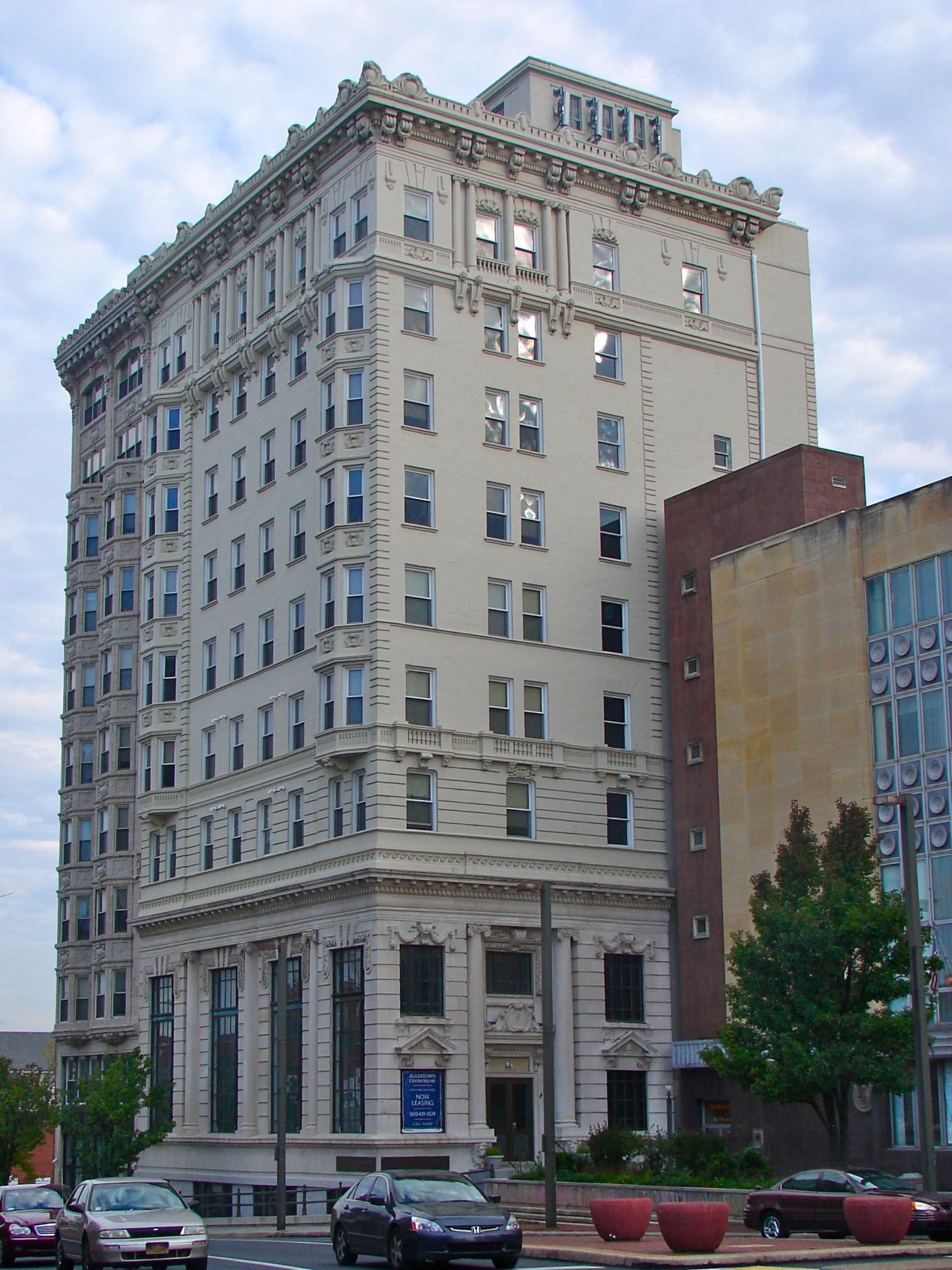
- Allentown National Bank in October 2011

- Location within Pennsylvania
- Location: 13-17 North 7th Street, Allentown, Pennsylvania
- Coordinates: 40°36′17″N 75°28′17″W
- Area: less than one acre
- Built: 1905
- Architect: Jacoby, Weishampel & Biggin; Gangewere, William
- Engineer: Guerber Engineering
- Architectural style: Beaux Arts
- NRHP reference No.: 05001490
- Added to NRHP: December 28, 2005

The Allentown National Bank, originally named the Allentown Bank, is an historic bank building located on Centre Square in Allentown, Lehigh County, Pennsylvania. Built in 1905, the building is a large eight-story, steel frame and masonry-clad structure in the Beaux-Arts style.

Abandoned during the 1990s, it was re-developed into apartments for independent living senior citizens in the early 2000s.

The building was added to the National Register of Historic Places in 2005.

== History ==
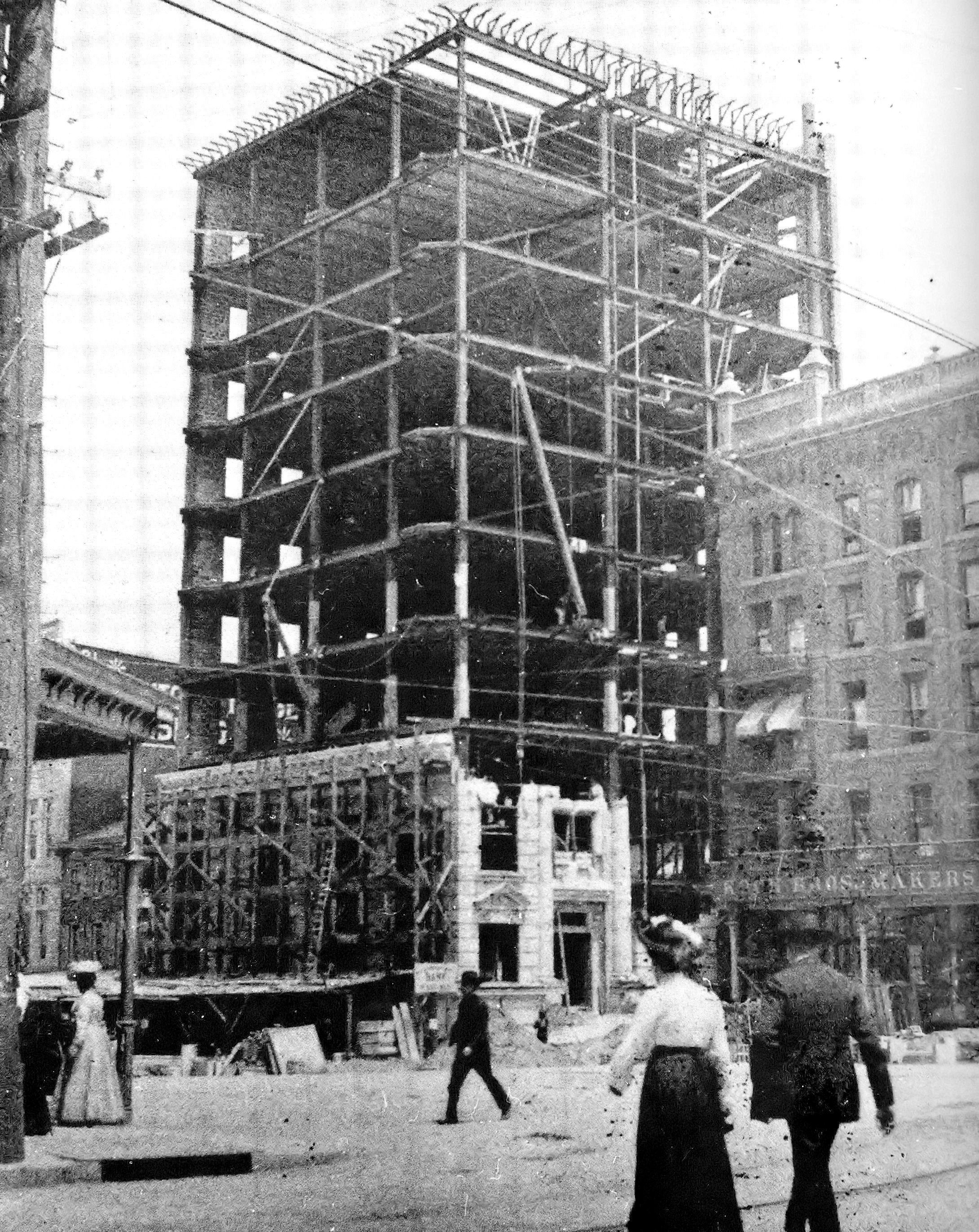
The Allentown National Bank building under construction in 1904; the Allen Hotel to the right of the building was razed in 1958.

Allentown architects Jacoby, Weishampel & Biggin designed the building in a Beaux Arts style. It remains the last commercial structure downtown built in Center City Allentown before 1920 that stands in its original condition.

Construction of the building started on August 12, 1903. Its steel framework was finished on May 7, 1904. The steel came from Guerber Engineering of west Bethlehem, and the stonework was done by Carlucci Stone Co. of Scranton. The concrete ceilings were installed by Roebling Construction Co., founded by the same Roebling family that built the Brooklyn Bridge. One worker, Fred Mummey, died in the construction of the eight-story structure; he was knocked from a high steel beam on 4 February 1904, by the boom of a swinging derrick.

The Allentown Bank opened its doors on 15 March 1905 with a modern telephone exchange that was tied in with both the Lehigh and Consolidated phone systems, the region's two phone companies. In addition, the two "smoothly running hydraulic elevators" were said to be the ultimate in safety.

The building also had a "spacious dome 32 feet in height supported by 6 onyx columns surmounting the rotunda," according to a local newspaper at the time. "The carving and molding is the work of Herman Merkel, a noted local sculptor. The rotunda is not currently visible from the street.

In 1934, the Allentown Bank became the Allentown National Bank after being federally re-chartered as a national bank. It remained at that location until the mid-1950s, when it became the First National Bank. Operations were moved to a new building at the northeast corner of Seventh and Hamilton in 1959, which replaced the former Allen Hotel, and the structure was vacated. First National subsequently merged into Meridian Bank during the 1980s.

The 1959 bank building remained vacant until being razed in 2012 for the construction of Two City Center. During the 1970s and 1980s, the Allentown National Bank building was home to several businesses and the Allentown Business School. It was vacated again during the early 1990s.

== Current use ==
In 2002, Pennrose Properties Inc. in Philadelphia purchased the property and converted the upper floors to independent living apartments for senior citizens.

The renovation also included the adjacent former Trojan Powder Company building at 17 North 7th Street, which was built in 1912. The rehabilitative scope of work included the complete remediation of all environmentally hazardous elements and the removal on non-historical elements throughout the building; the complete stabilization of the structure of the buildings, including the stabilization of the ornamental cornices and façade elements; the restoration of the Allentown National Bank interior elements, including the removal of the floor inserted into the bank lobby and the restoration of the interior building elements; complete rehabilitation of the 11 floors of the Trojan Powder building and eight floors of the Allentown National Bank building into 63 apartments and related community spaces.

In 2007, Allentown Center Square Senior Housing re-opened with 63 one-bedroom apartment units for independent seniors aged 62 and older. The 62 one-bedroom units are sized at 548 square feet and rent for up to $469. There is one efficiency unit, which is 395 square feet and rents for $375. About half the units are targeted to people earning up to 60 percent of the median income. The development also has a gym, a computer lab, a community room, and an examining room for visiting doctors and nurses. Lease-up began April 2006, just a month before completion. Full occupancy was achieved in eight months.

== See also ==
- Dime Savings and Trust Company
- List of historic places in Allentown, Pennsylvania
