= Linden Grove Pavilion =

- U.S. National Register of Historic Places
- U.S. Historic district – Contributing property
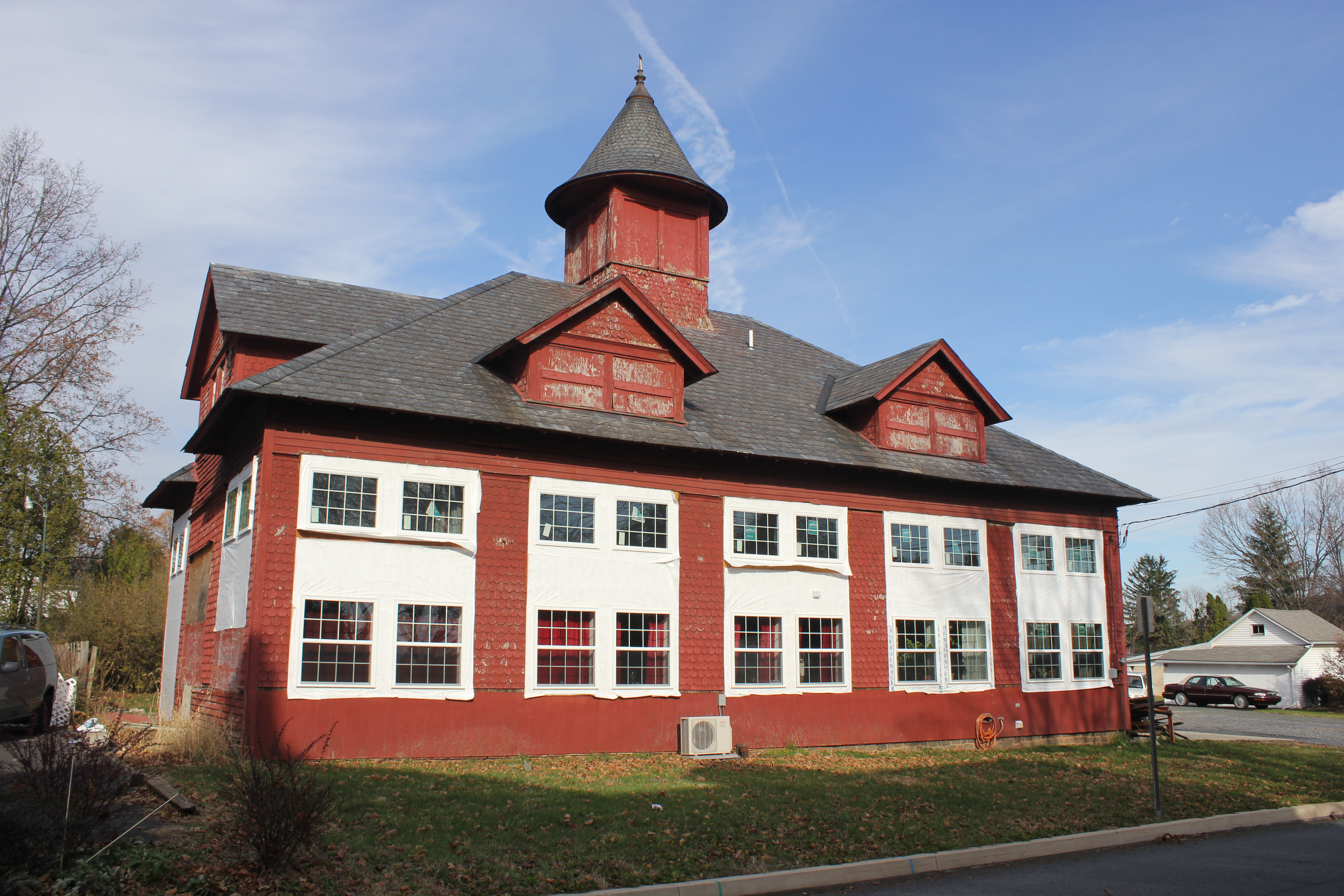

- Location within Pennsylvania Location within the United States
- Location: Linden and S. Main Sts, Coopersburg, Pennsylvania
- Coordinates: 40°30′18″N 75°23′35″W
- Area: 0.3 acres (0.12 ha)
- Built: c. 1900
- Architectural style: Queen Anne
- NRHP reference No.: 79002289
- Added to NRHP: November 30, 1979

Linden Grove Pavilion is a historic pavilion located at Coopersburg, Lehigh County, Pennsylvania. It was built about 1900, and is a 2 1/2-story, rectangular building with textured wooden siding and a slate covered hipped roof in the Queen Anne style. It is 10 bays wide, 60 feet by 40 feet. It was used as an exercise and auction pavilion for animals and machinery, and later as a warehouse.

It was listed on the National Register of Historic Places in 1979. It is a contributing property to the Coopersburg Historic District.
