= Catasauqua Residential Historic District =

Historic district in Pennsylvania, United States

- U.S. National Register of Historic Places
- U.S. Historic district
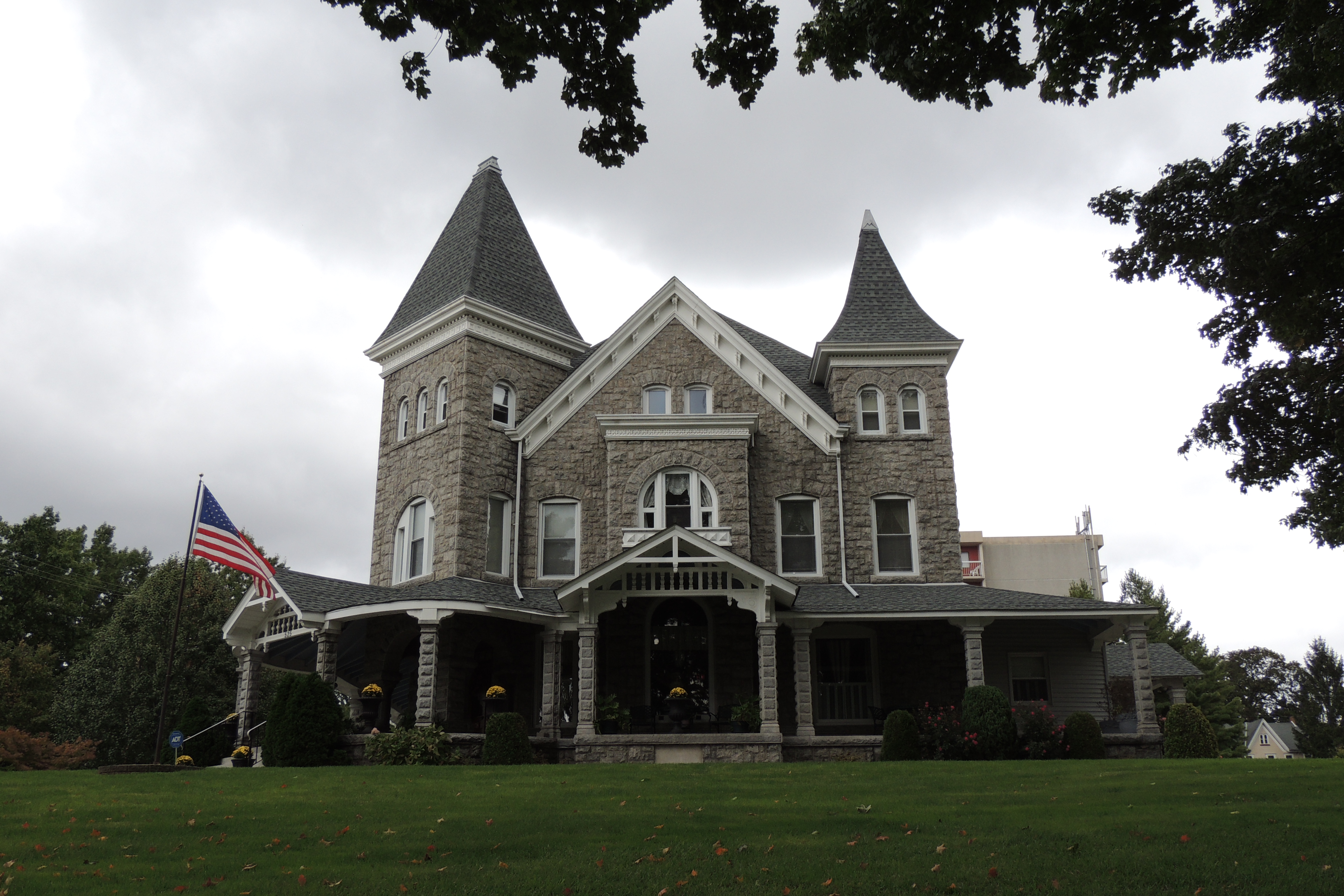
- David Thomas House

- Location within Pennsylvania Location within the United States
- Location: Roughly bounded by Howertown Rd., Railroad Ave., Oak and Bridge Sts., Catasauqua, Pennsylvania
- Coordinates: 40°39′19″N 75°28′25″W
- Area: 23 acres (9.3 ha)
- Architectural style: Colonial Revival, Queen Anne, Neo-Classical Revival
- NRHP reference No.: 84003465
- Added to NRHP: May 10, 1984

Catasauqua Residential Historic District is a national historic district located at Catasauqua, Lehigh County, Pennsylvania. The district includes 63 contributing buildings in Catasauqua. It consists mainly of large mid- to late-19th century dwellings in a variety of architectural styles including Colonial Revival, Queen Anne, and Neo-Classical Revival styles. Notable residences are the Dery Mansion, David Thomas House, Fatzinger House, and Oscar Stein House.

It was added to the National Register of Historic Places in 1984.
