= Burnside Plantation (Bethlehem, Pennsylvania) =

Historic house in Pennsylvania, United States

- U.S. National Register of Historic Places
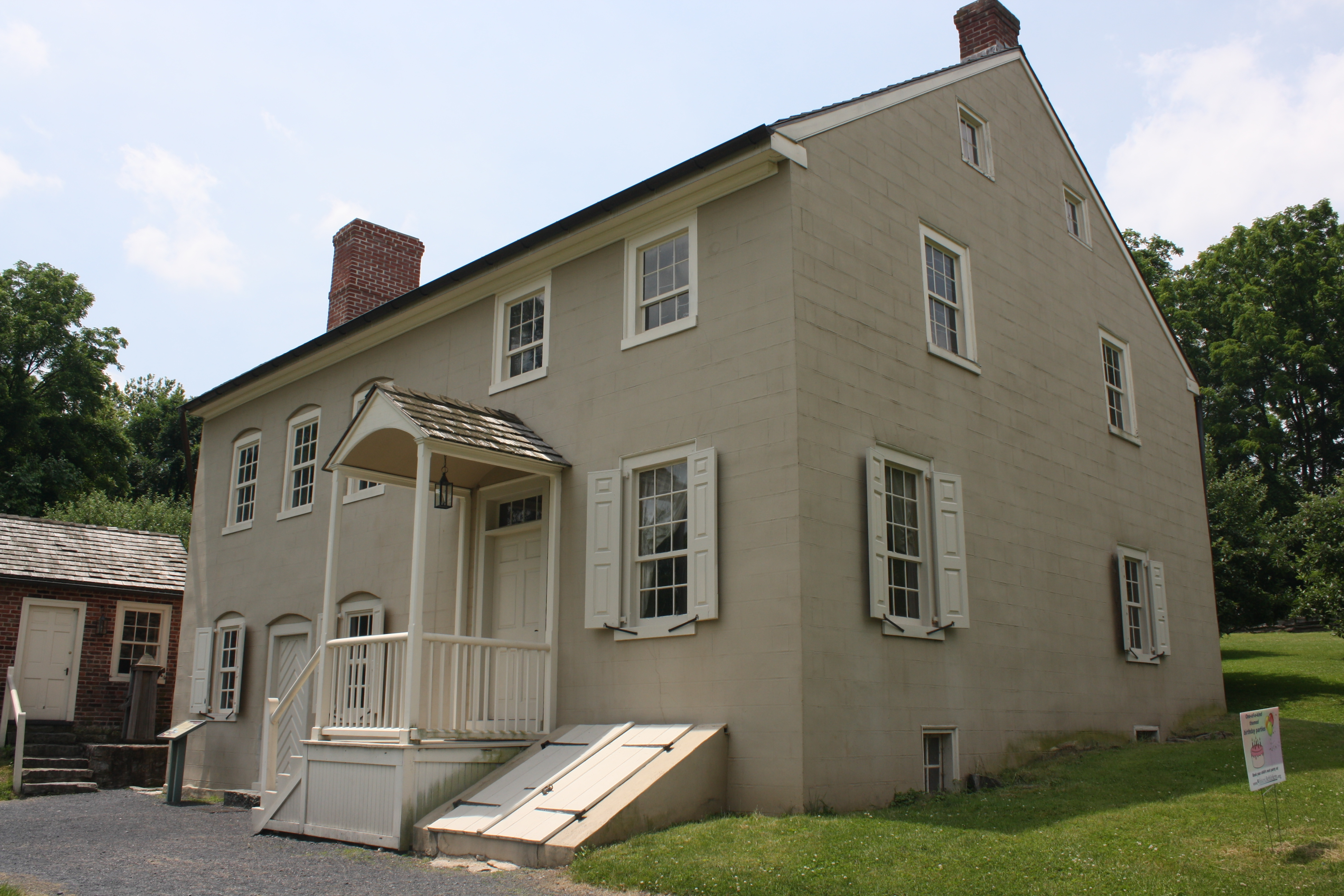
- Burnside Plantation Farmhouse. June 2013.

- Location within Pennsylvania
- Location: 1461 Schoenersville Road, Bethlehem, Pennsylvania
- Coordinates: 40°37′52″N 75°23′22″W
- Area: 6.5 acres (2.6 ha)
- Architectural style: Federal, Vernacular Germanic
- NRHP reference No.: 90000705
- Added to NRHP: May 2, 1990

The Burnside Plantation is a 6.5-acre (2.6 ha) plantation in Bethlehem, Pennsylvania and was listed on the National Register of Historic Places in 1990. It is also known as the James Burnside Plantation and Lerch Farm. The plantation is located 0.2 miles (0.32 km) southeast of the intersection with Eaton Ave, on Schoenersville Road.

== History ==
James Burnside bought a 500-acre (200 ha) tract of land from John Stephen Benezet in 1748. Burnside sold 200 acres (81 ha) a group of Moravians in 1751. In 1758, Burnside's widow sold the remaining 300 acres (120 ha) to the Moravian Church. The Church leased the plantation to individual farmers from 1765 to 1845.

The plantation was sold to Charles A. Luckenbach, who sold it to William Lerch in 1853. It stayed in the Lerch family until 1928, when it sold and was divided between the Hafleighs and the Birks.

Lehigh County bought the plantation in 1986 and leased it into the private corporation Historic Bethlehem Museums & Sites "to restore, develop, and manage [it] as a living and natural history resource". It was listed on the National Register of Historic Places on May 2, 1990.

The museum is an affiliate within the Smithsonian Affiliations program.

Today the farmstead hosts a variety of events, volunteer projects, venue rentals, historic tours, and festivals. Visitors can tour the farmhouse and the barns and learn about the daily lives of the early people who lived here.

No people or animals presently live on the plantation but it was home to the Bethlehem Mounted Police Unit horses from 2009 through early 2017.

== Gallery ==
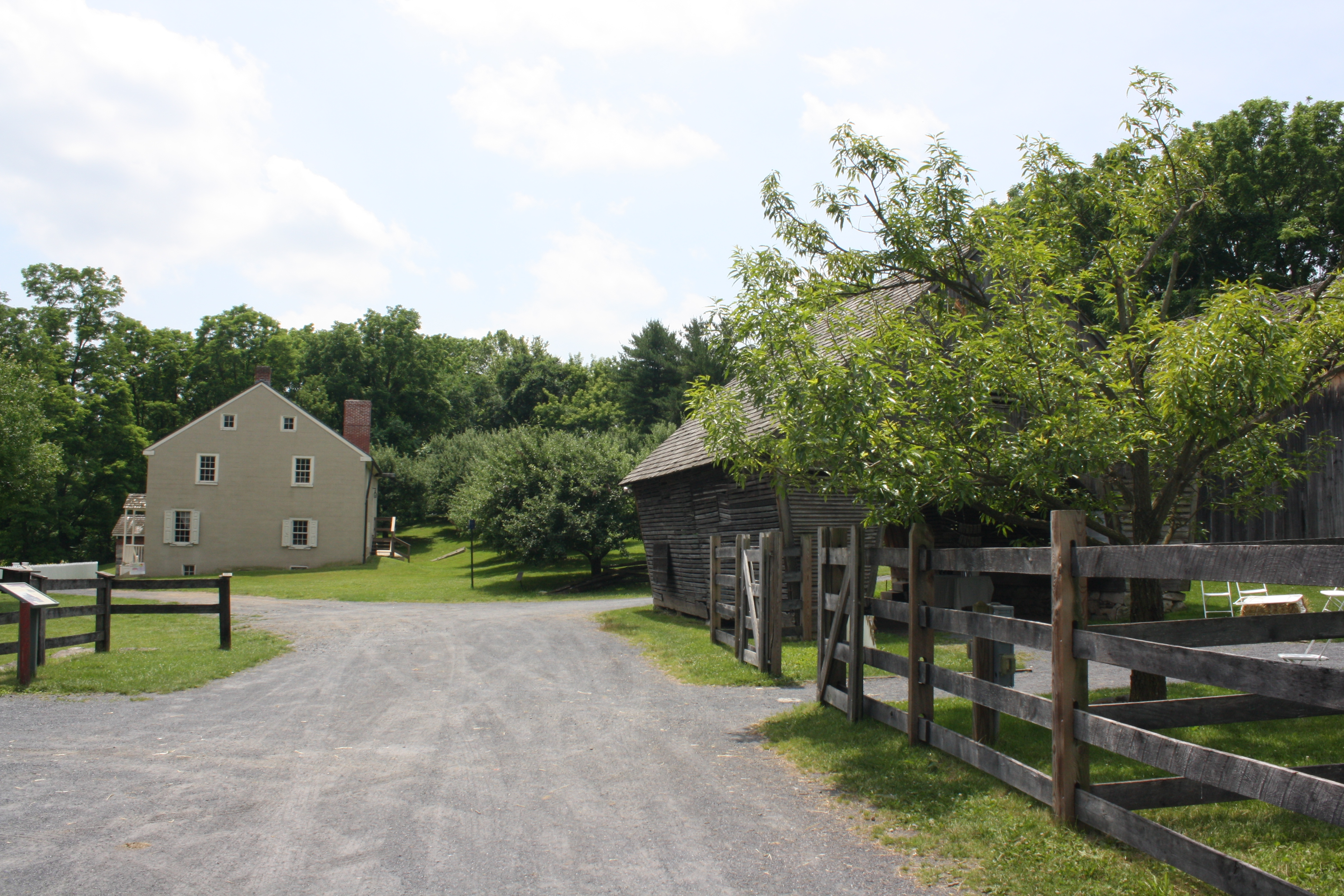
View on Plantation

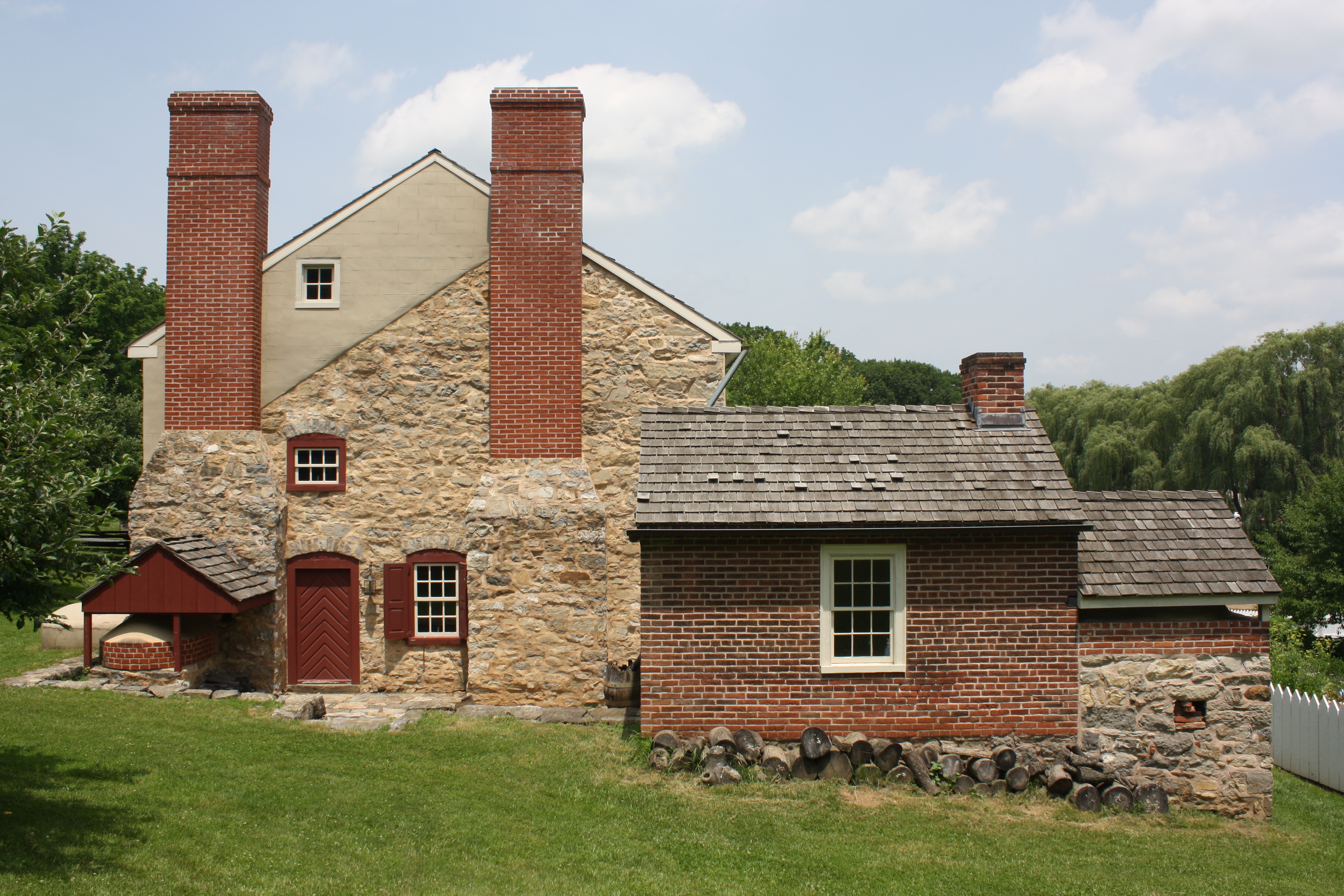
Farmhouse and Summer Kitchen

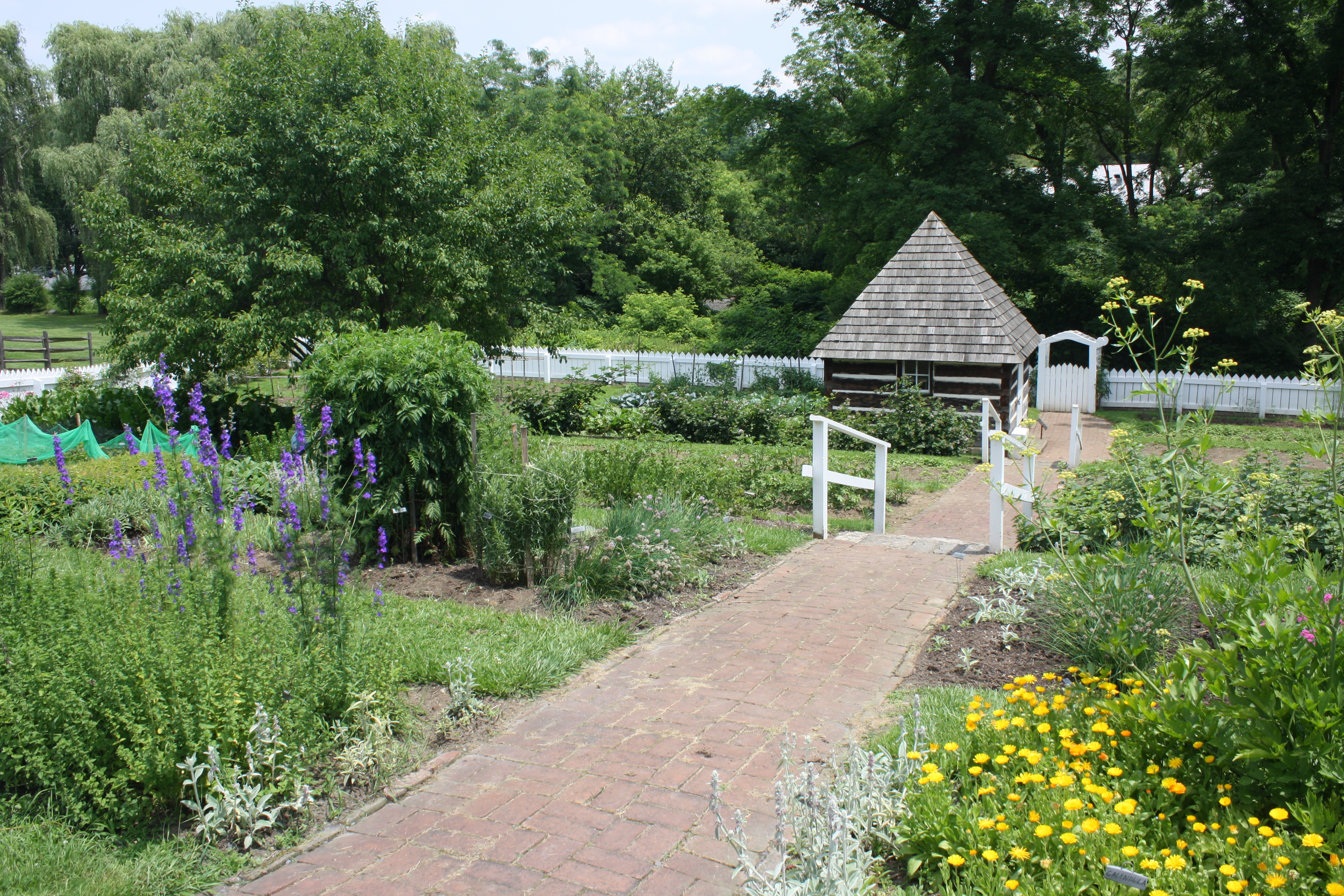
Garden

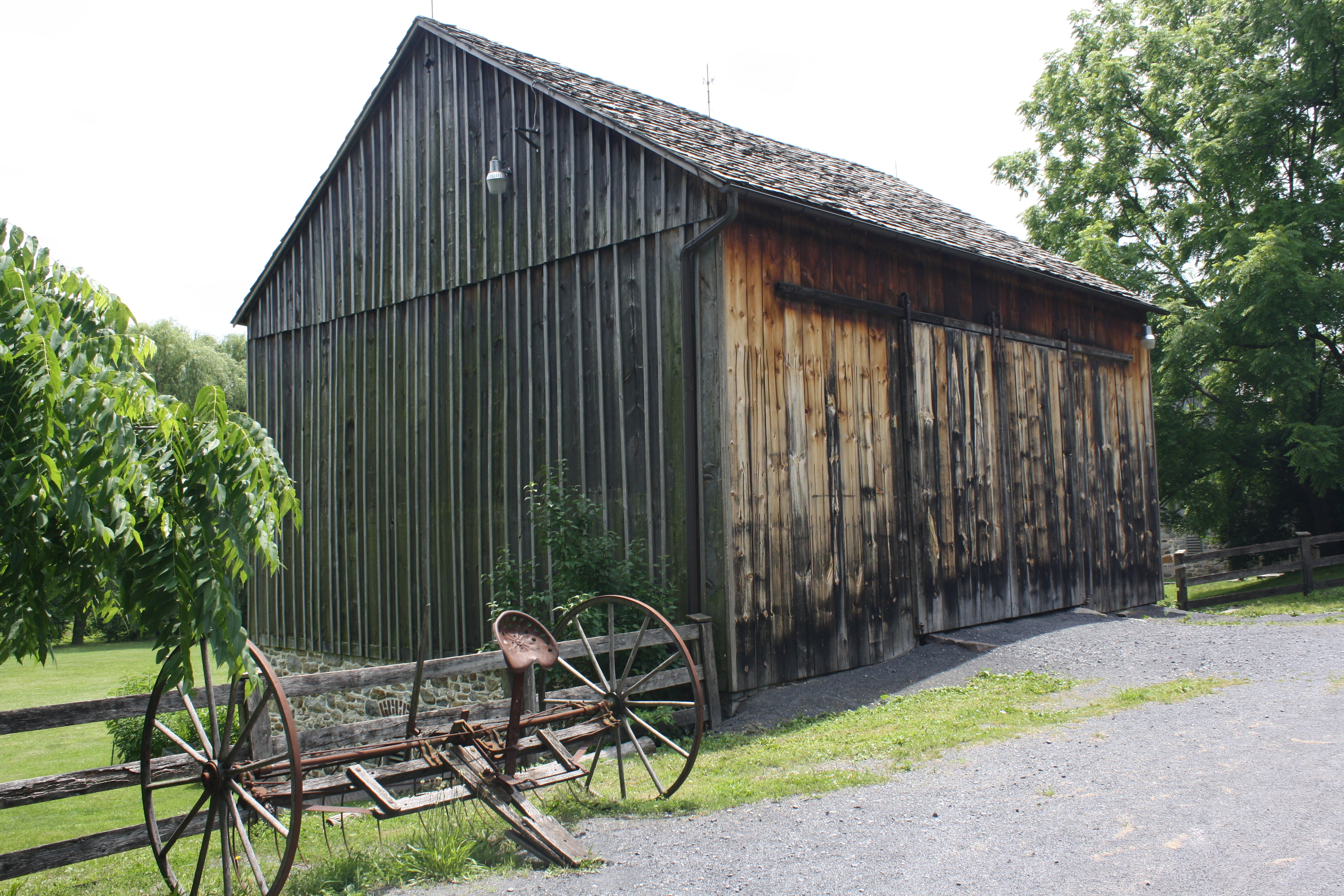
Haas Barn

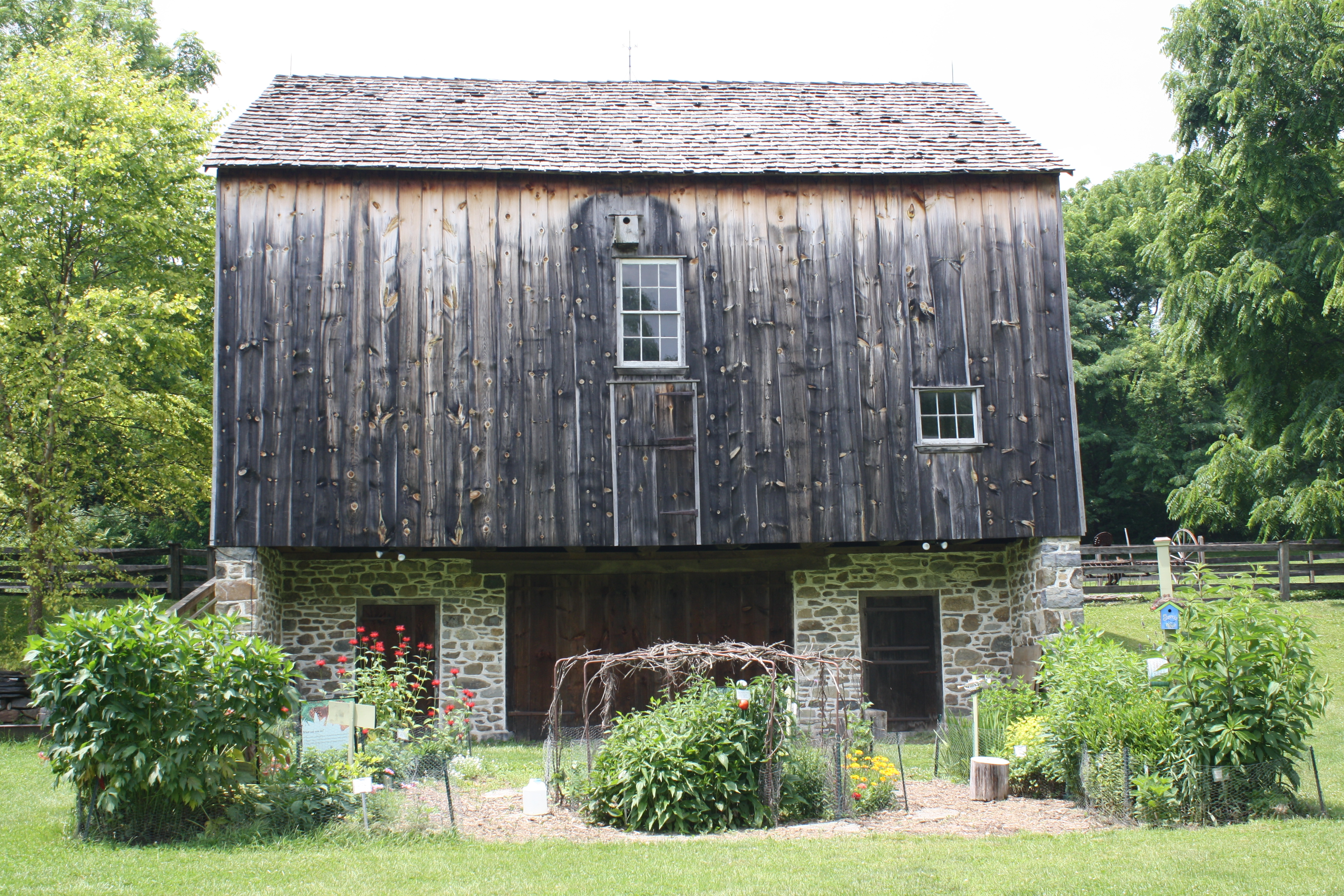
Haas Barn

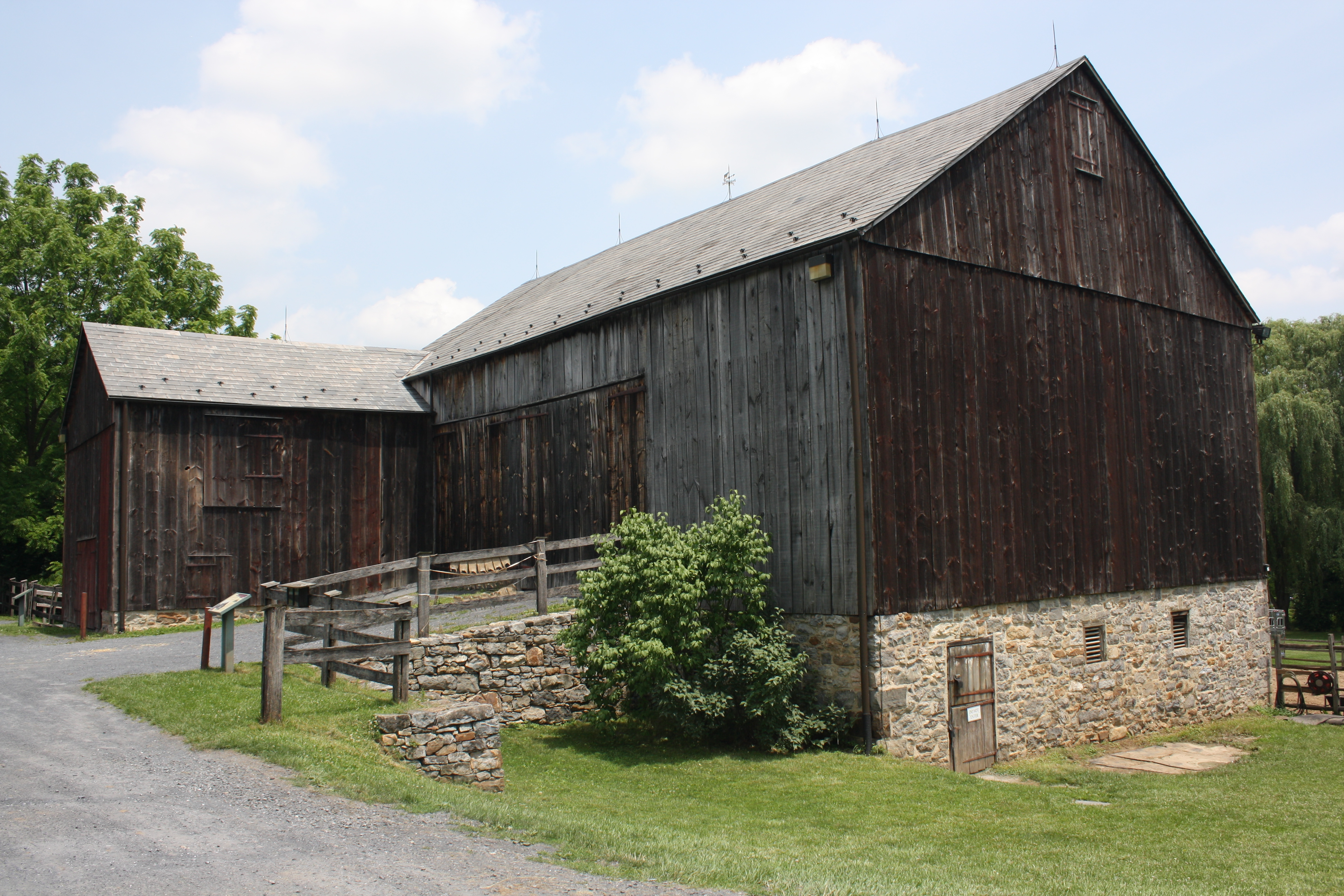
Barn and Horsepower Shed

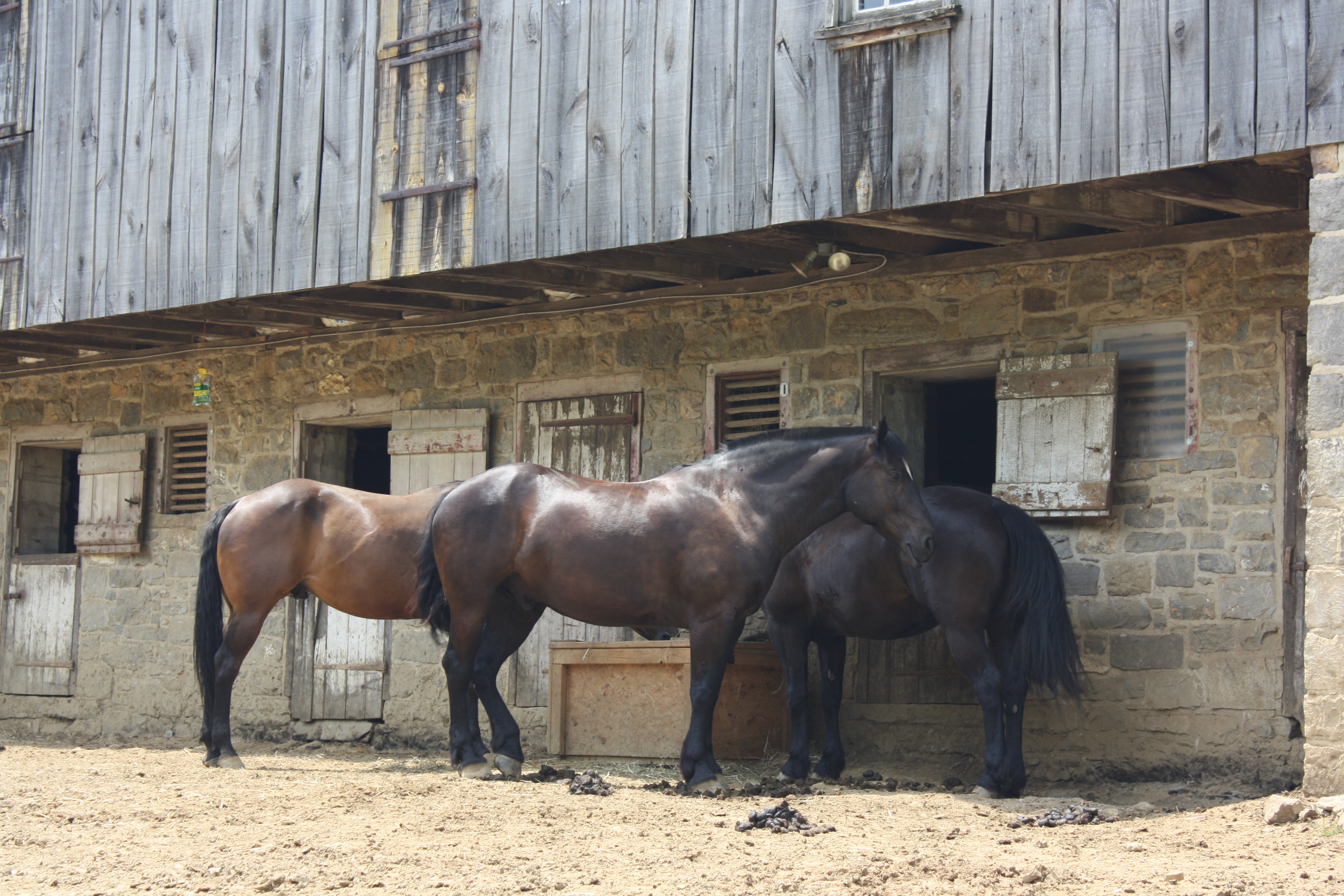
Barn and Horsepower Shed

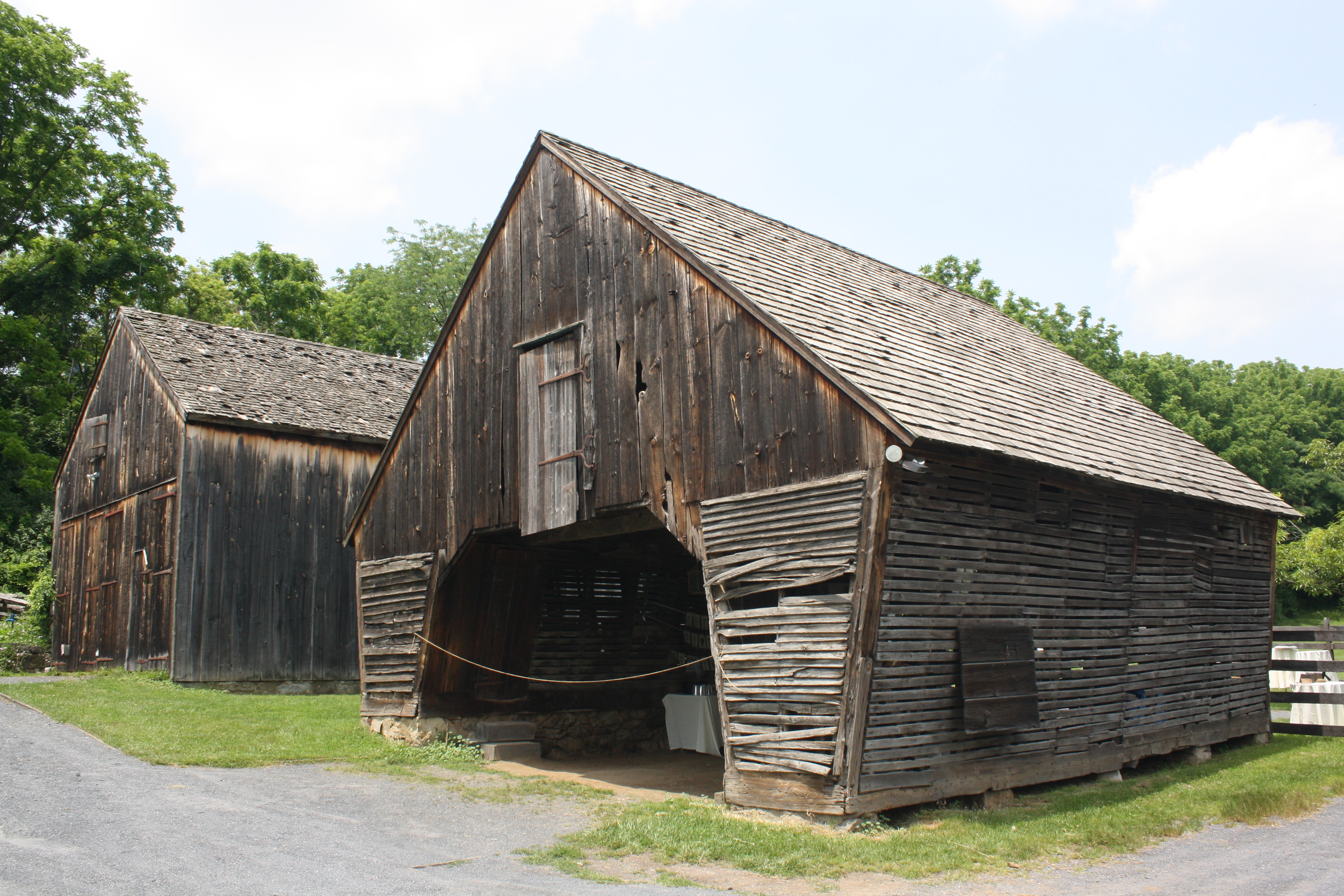
Corn Crib

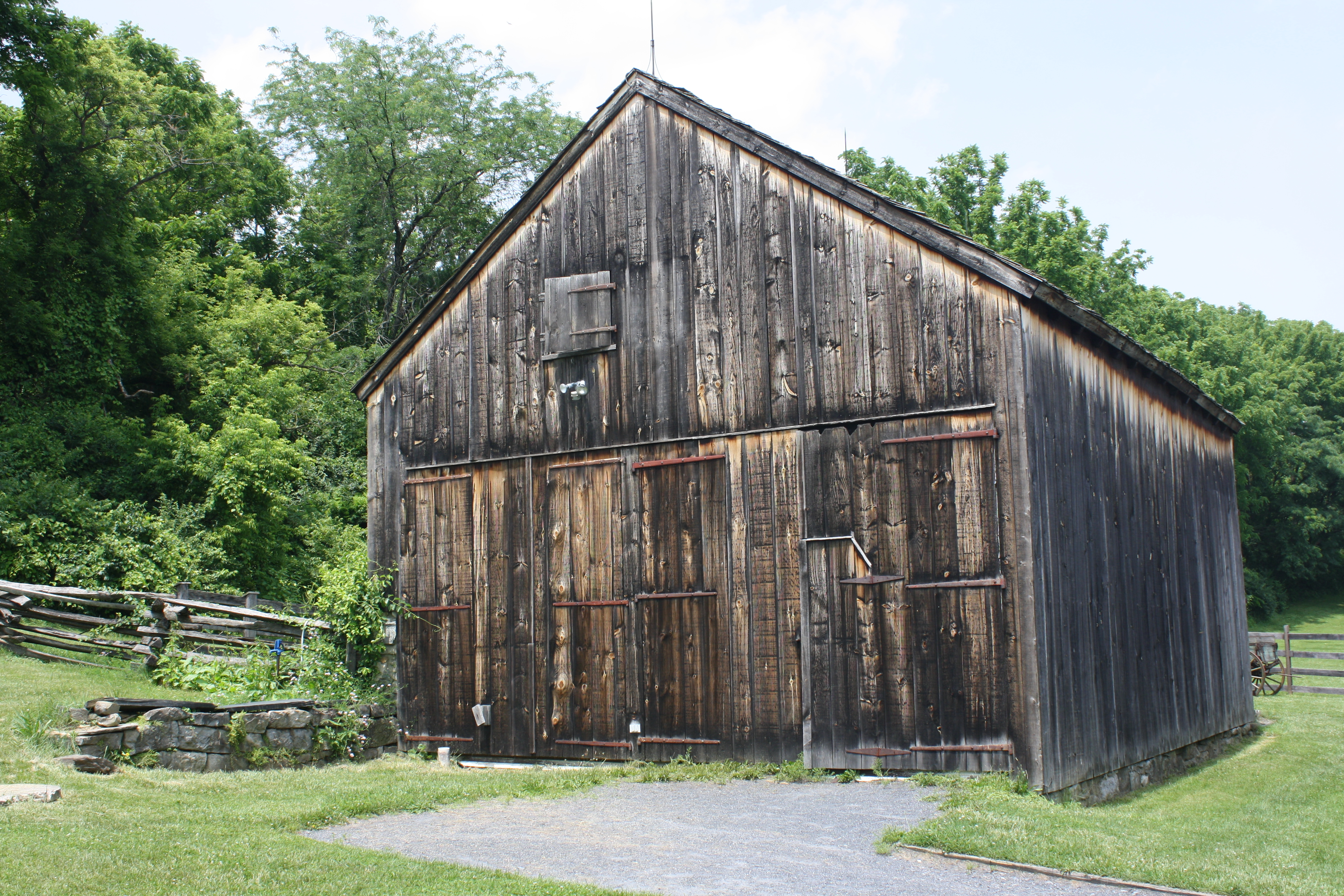
Wagon Shed

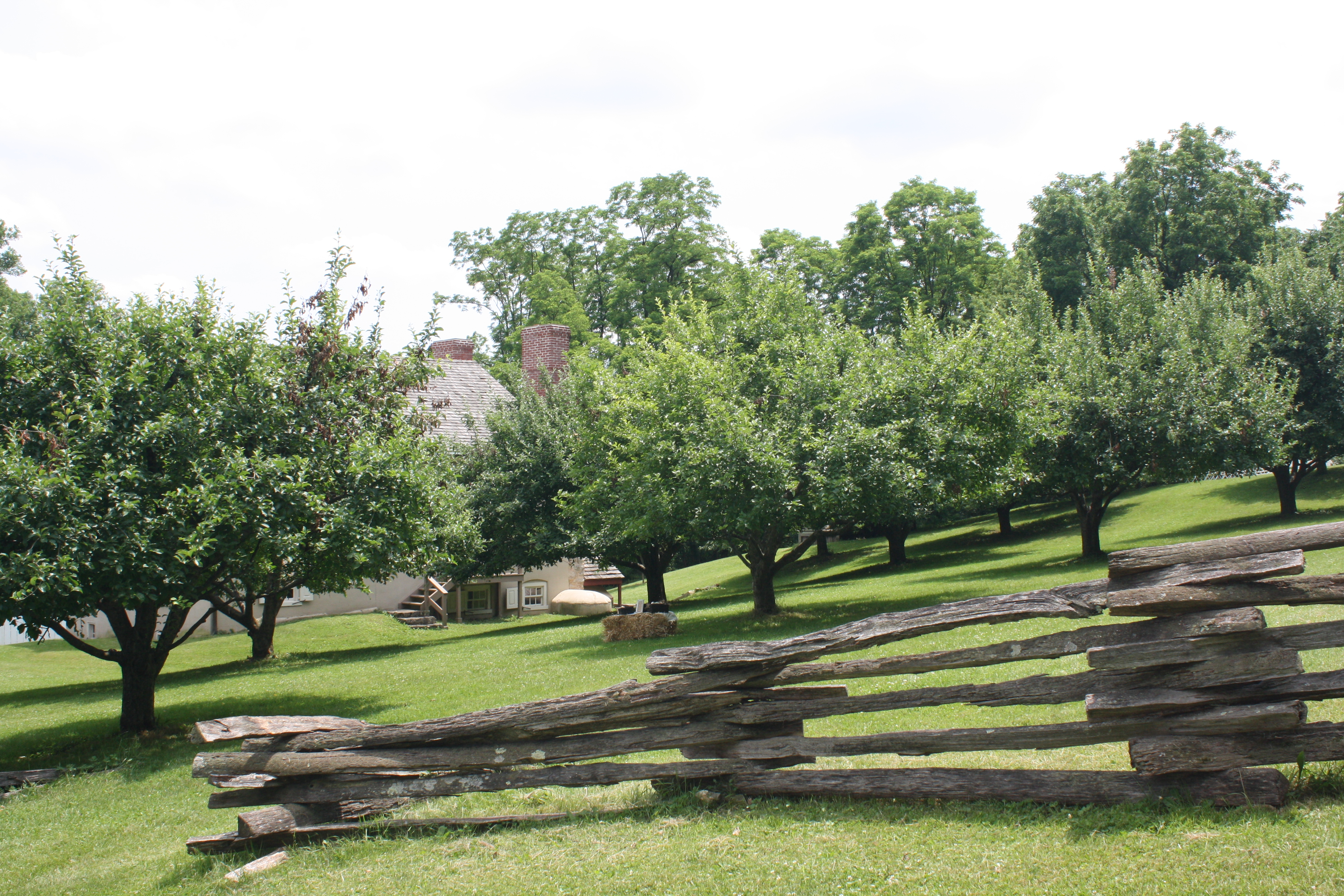
Apple Orchard

== See also ==
- National Register of Historic Places listings in Lehigh County, Pennsylvania
