= Dime Savings and Trust Company =

- U.S. National Register of Historic Places
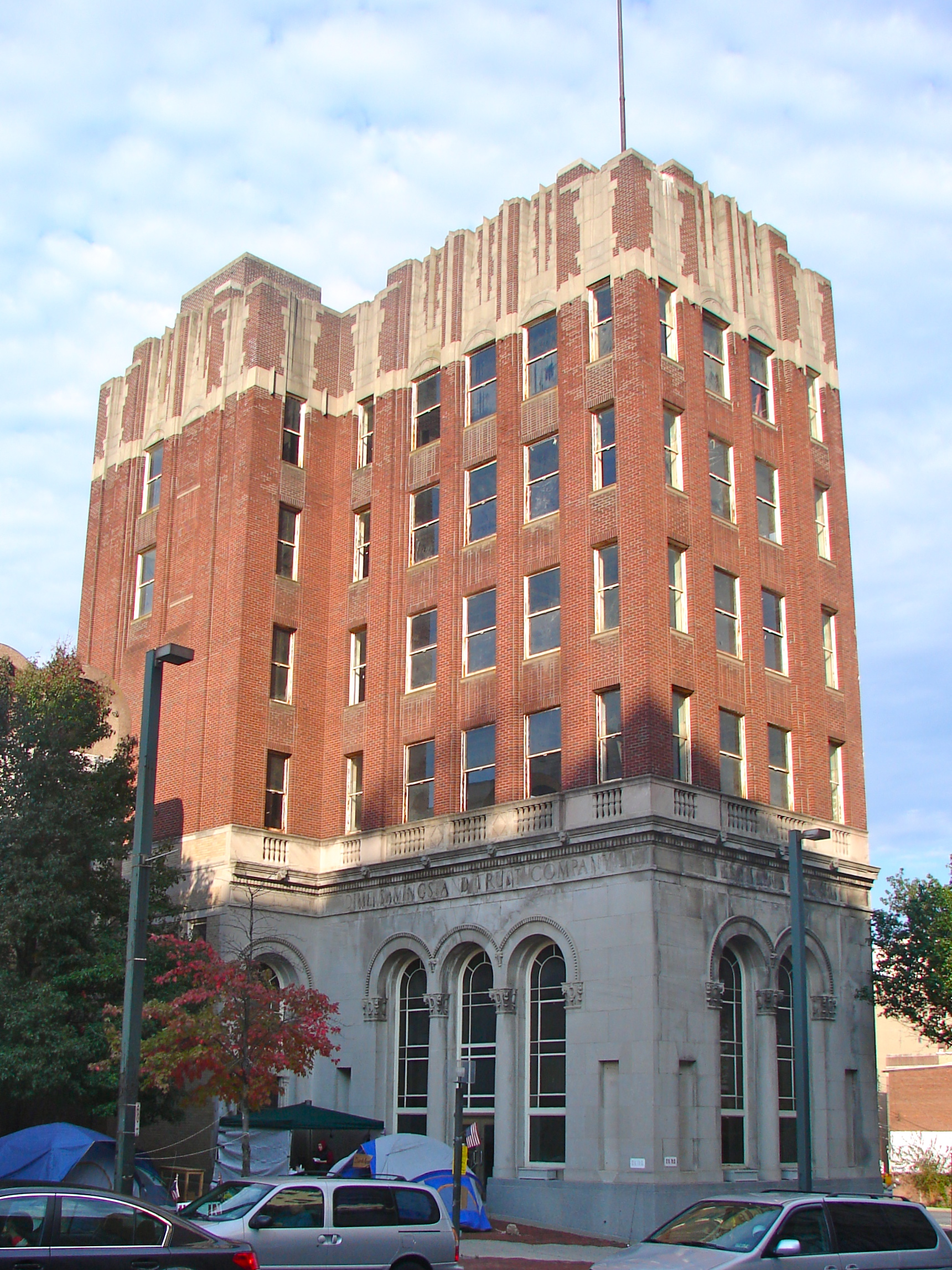
- Dime Savings and Trust Company in Allentown, Pennsylvania, October 2011

- Location within Pennsylvania Location within the United States
- Location: 12 North 7th Street, Allentown, Pennsylvania
- Coordinates: 40°36′8″N 75°28′22″W
- Area: 0.5 acres (0.20 ha)
- Built: 1925
- Architect: Tilghman Moyer and Co.
- Architectural style: Art Deco
- NRHP reference No.: 85000036
- Added to NRHP: January 3, 1985

The Dime Savings and Trust Company, also known as the First Valley Bank, is a historic bank building located in Allentown, Pennsylvania. It was built in 1925, and is a T-shaped, five-story red brick building.

The base is sheathed in limestone, and the distinctive brick and limestone attic level is reflective of the Art Deco style.

It was added to the National Register of Historic Places in 1985.

== History ==
=== Development ===
Drawing on the name of a bank from the 1840s, the Dime Savings and Trust Company was founded in 1921 as the fifth-largest bank in Allentown. Dime Savings building was one of three principal buildings in Allentown's central business district; the other two were Americus Hotel and the PPL Building, all which were all built in the same two-year span and reflected the Art Deco design trends then popular in Allentown and the New York City regions.

The interior main banking room is one of the best-preserved monumental banking rooms of its day in the Allentown region. Occupying the full width of the front wing, it extends back beyond the elevator core. At the rear, it is spanned by a balcony that marks the full two stories of the room, which is accented by a blind niche framed by engaged piers and consoles. The room itself is surrounded by a deep, dentelle cornice, similar to that of the exterior, which, with the arcaded walls, completes the sense of a monumental masonry space that was common to major banks of the era. In addition, a pair of handsome Art Deco bronze chandeliers with fluted sides are suspended from the ceiling at each end of the room.

=== 20th century ===
At the start of the Great Depression in 1930, the bank was one of the largest in the city; by 1932, however, it had failed, leaving only its building as a reminder of its former success. After the bank's failure, the Dime Savings and Trust Company building spent most of its existence vacant while a series of owners tried and failed to find ways to use it.

Added to the National Register of Historic Places in 1985, the monumental first-floor room was renovated in 1991 by a private owner, who was subsequently recognized by city leaders for his restoration efforts. It housed an antique market for a few years and survived the catastrophic sinkhole-caused collapse of its adjacent neighbor, Corporate Plaza (22 North Seventh Street), on February 23, 1994.

=== 21st century ===
Ownership had changed hands several times, but the building remained vacant. Owned for a time by developer Abe Atiyeh, it was put it up for auction on eBay in 2001. In 2004, a Philadelphia-based creator of upscale furniture purchased it, planning a combination restaurant and furniture showroom, but those plans were abandoned in 2007.

In 2012, the building was renovated as part of the PPL Center project that began construction in 2012. The structure was incorporated into the Arena complex. The Dime Bank Building is used as the lobby for the 170-room Marriott Renaissance Hotel that is attached to the arena. Its two-story foyer, once the main banking area, houses the front desk, and upper floors include offices and meeting space for the arena operators.

During the construction of the arena, the foundation was underpinned, and the building received additional stabilization. The facade was repaired with appropriate control joints, masonry supports, and drainage that replaced systems failing in the current structure. New roofing and windows were installed, adding energy efficiency but designed to match the existing look.

However, because of leaking bricks, the arena owners decided to strip the exterior above the first floor off the building, down to its steel structural skeleton. The building's existing columns and beams were reinforced with steel plates to support new uses as the Dime Bank was incorporated into the arena. Lost was the iconic attic story, in classic art deco style. Also lost was the beautiful ornate ceiling in the monumental banking chamber.

The remaining parts of the building were incorporated into the Renaissance hotel, which opened in the summer of 2015. The on-site restaurant is named The Dime in recognition of the bank.

== See also ==
- Allentown National Bank
- List of historic places in Allentown, Pennsylvania
