= Mount Airy Historic District (Bethlehem, Pennsylvania) =

Historic district in Pennsylvania, United States

- U.S. National Register of Historic Places
- U.S. Historic district
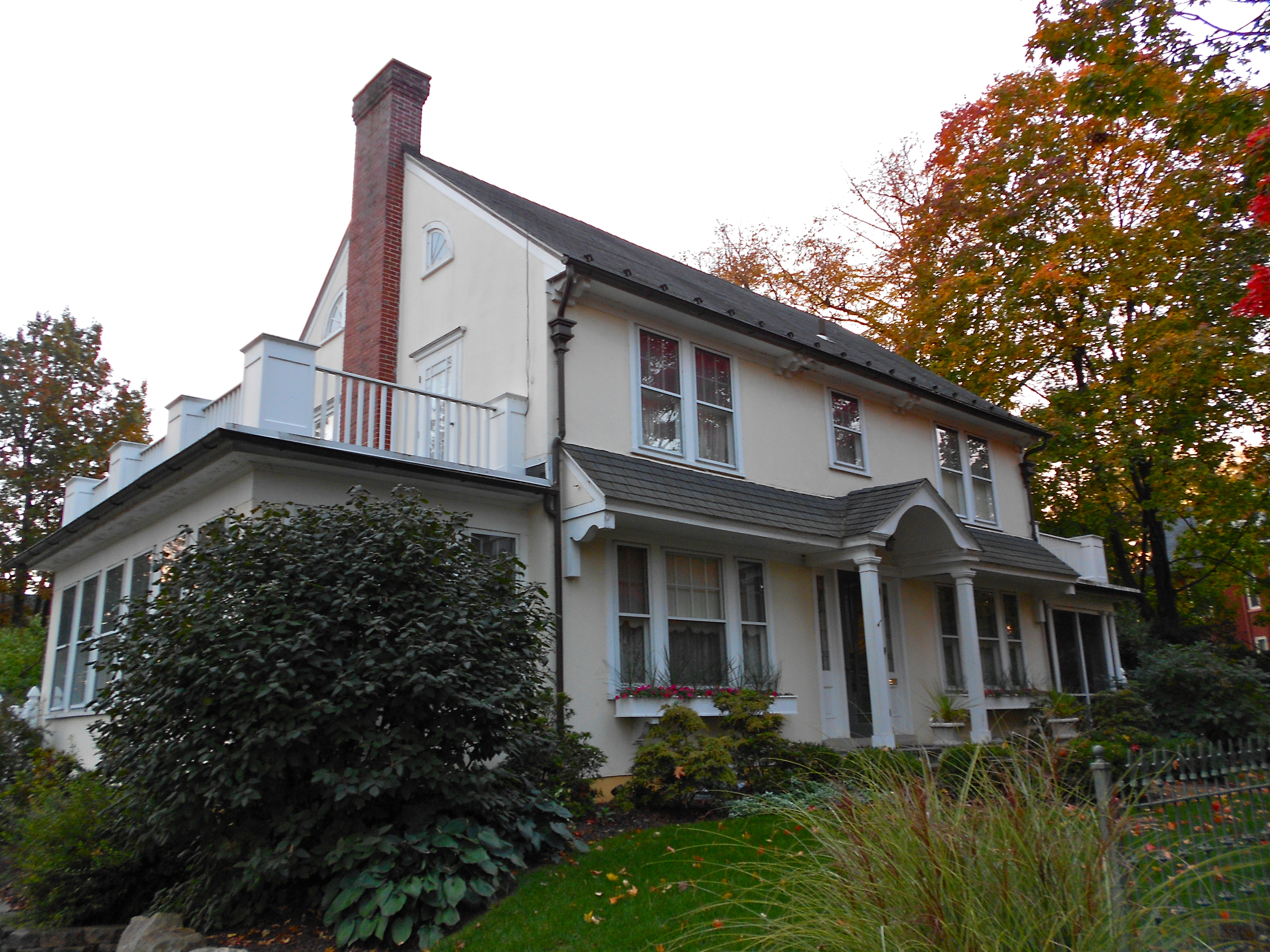
- House at 8th and Prospect in the Mount Airy Historic District, October 2012

- Location within Pennsylvania Location within the United States
- Location: Roughly Prospect Ave. between 15th St. and 8th Ave., Bethlehem, Pennsylvania, U.S.
- Coordinates: 40°37′12″N 75°24′09″W
- Area: 33.3 acres (13.5 ha)
- Architectural style: Late 19th And 20th Century Revivals, Late Victorian
- NRHP reference No.: 88000453
- Added to NRHP: May 9, 1988

Mount Airy Historic District, also known as Mount Airy Park, is a national historic district located at Bethlehem, Lehigh County, Pennsylvania.

The district includes 27 contributing buildings in a residential area of Bethlehem. It includes large, ornate residences built between 1910 and 1930. A few date as early as 1895.

It was added to the National Register of Historic Places in 1988.

== See also ==
- National Register of Historic Places listings in Lehigh County, Pennsylvania
