= Pennsylvania Route 233 =

State highway in Pennsylvania, US

Pennsylvania Route 233

Route information
- Maintained by PennDOT
- Length: 53.257 mi (85.709 km)

Major junctions
- South end: PA 997 in Mont Alto
- US 30 near Fayetteville PA 174 in Dickinson; I-81 near Newville; US 11 near Newville; PA 533 in Newville; PA 641 in Newville; PA 944 in Lower Mifflin Township; PA 997 in Lower Mifflin Township PA 850 in Landisburg
- North end: PA 274 in Green Park

Location
- Country: United States
- State: Pennsylvania
- Counties: Franklin, Adams, Cumberland, Perry

Highway system
- Pennsylvania State Route System; Interstate; US; State; Scenic; Legislative
← PA 232	→ PA 234

Pennsylvania Route 233 (PA 233) is a 53-mile-long (85 km) north–south state highway in south central Pennsylvania. It runs from PA 997 in Mont Alto north to PA 274 in Green Park. PA 233 heads northeast from Mont Alto through forested areas in the South Mountain range, where it runs through Mont Alto and Caledonia state parks and has an intersection with U.S. Route 30 (US 30). After heading northwest out of the mountains, the route continues into the agricultural Cumberland Valley, where it intersects Interstate 81 (I-81) and US 11 and crosses PA 641 in Newville. PA 233 crosses Blue Mountain into Perry County near Colonel Denning State Park and heads northeast to Landisburg, where it intersects PA 850 and turns north to continue to its terminus.

PA 233 was designated in 1928 to run from US 11 (now PA 174) in Dickinson north to PA 33 (now PA 34) in Dromgold, heading north to Landisburg before turning to the east. The road between Landisburg and Green Park became part of PA 74 the same year. In 1937, PA 233 was extended south from Dickinson to PA 997 in Mont Alto. The route was realigned to head north from Landisburg to PA 17 in Ickesburg in the 1930s, replacing a section of PA 74; the former alignment between Landisburg and Dromgold became part of PA 850. In the 1940s, the north end of PA 233 was cut back to PA 274 in Green Park, with most of the route north of there becoming an extended PA 74.

== Route description ==
=== Franklin and Adams counties ===
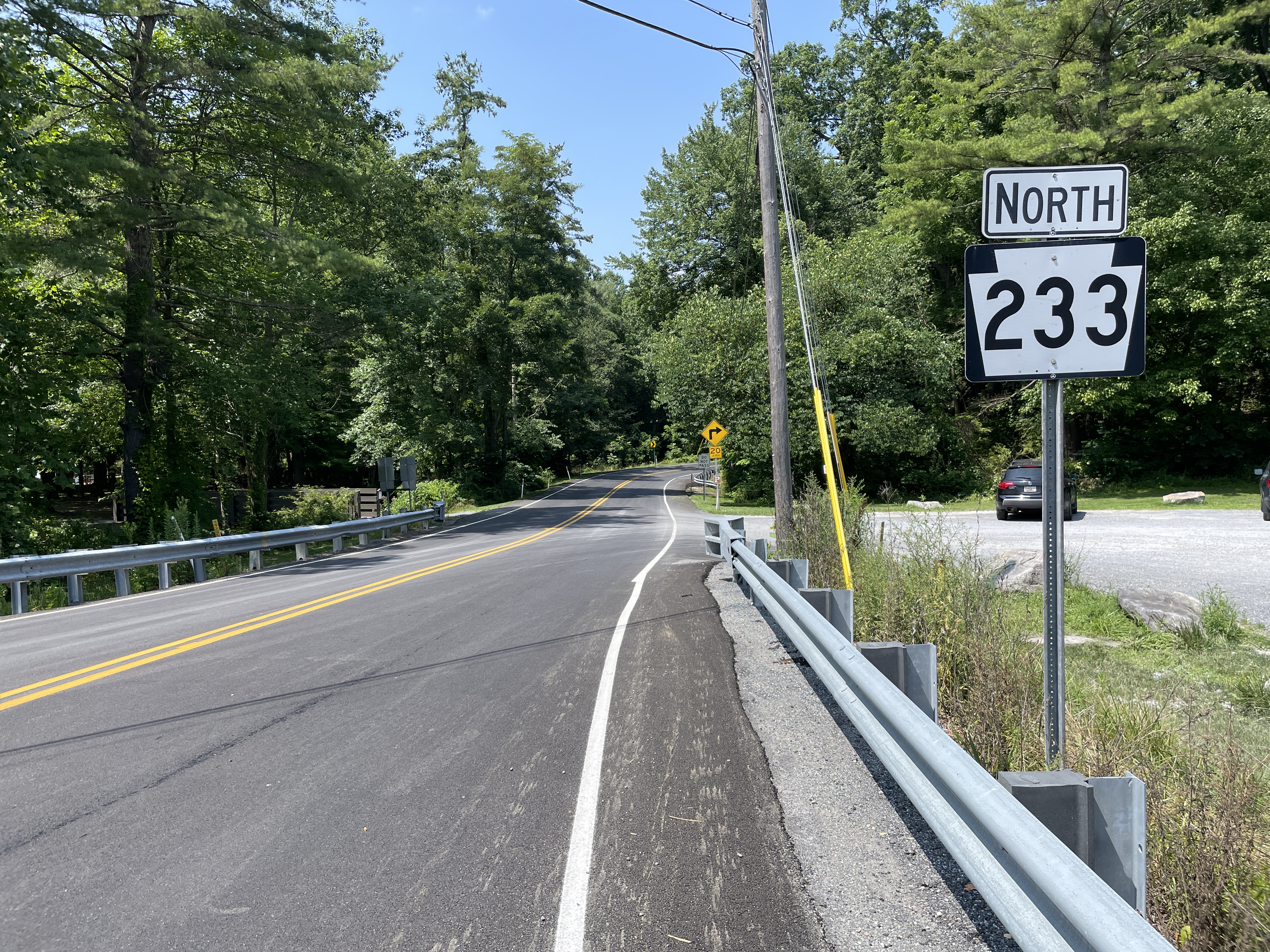
PA 233 northbound past US 30 in Greene Township

PA 233 begins at an intersection with PA 997 in the borough of Mont Alto in Franklin County, heading east on two-lane undivided Park Street. The road passes homes, becoming the border between Quincy Township to the north and Mont Alto to the south before fully entering Mont Alto again. The route heads entirely into Quincy Township as it passes the Penn State Mont Alto university campus. From here, PA 233 becomes Rocky Mountain Road South and continues near Mont Alto State Park and heads into Michaux State Forest. The route turns northeast to ascend Rocky Mountain, a part of the South Mountain range, becoming Rocky Mountain Road. The road enters Guilford Township and makes a hairpin turn to the south to descend the mountain, crossing back into Quincy Township. PA 233 curves east before heading northeast through more forests and entering Guilford Township again, where it crosses the Appalachian Trail. The route turns north-northeast and runs through more mountainous areas, heading into Greene Township. Here, PA 233 passes through Caledonia and crosses US 30 before running through forested Caledonia State Park as Pine Grove Road, turning northeast.

PA 233 crosses into Franklin Township in Adams County, leaving Caledonia State Park and continuing northeast through more of Michaux State Forest on Pine Grove Road. At this point, the route runs between East Big Flat Ridge to the northwest and Piney Mountain to the southeast, paralleling Conococheague Creek. The road stops following the creek as it heads into Menallen Township, running through more areas of mountains.

=== Cumberland and Perry counties ===
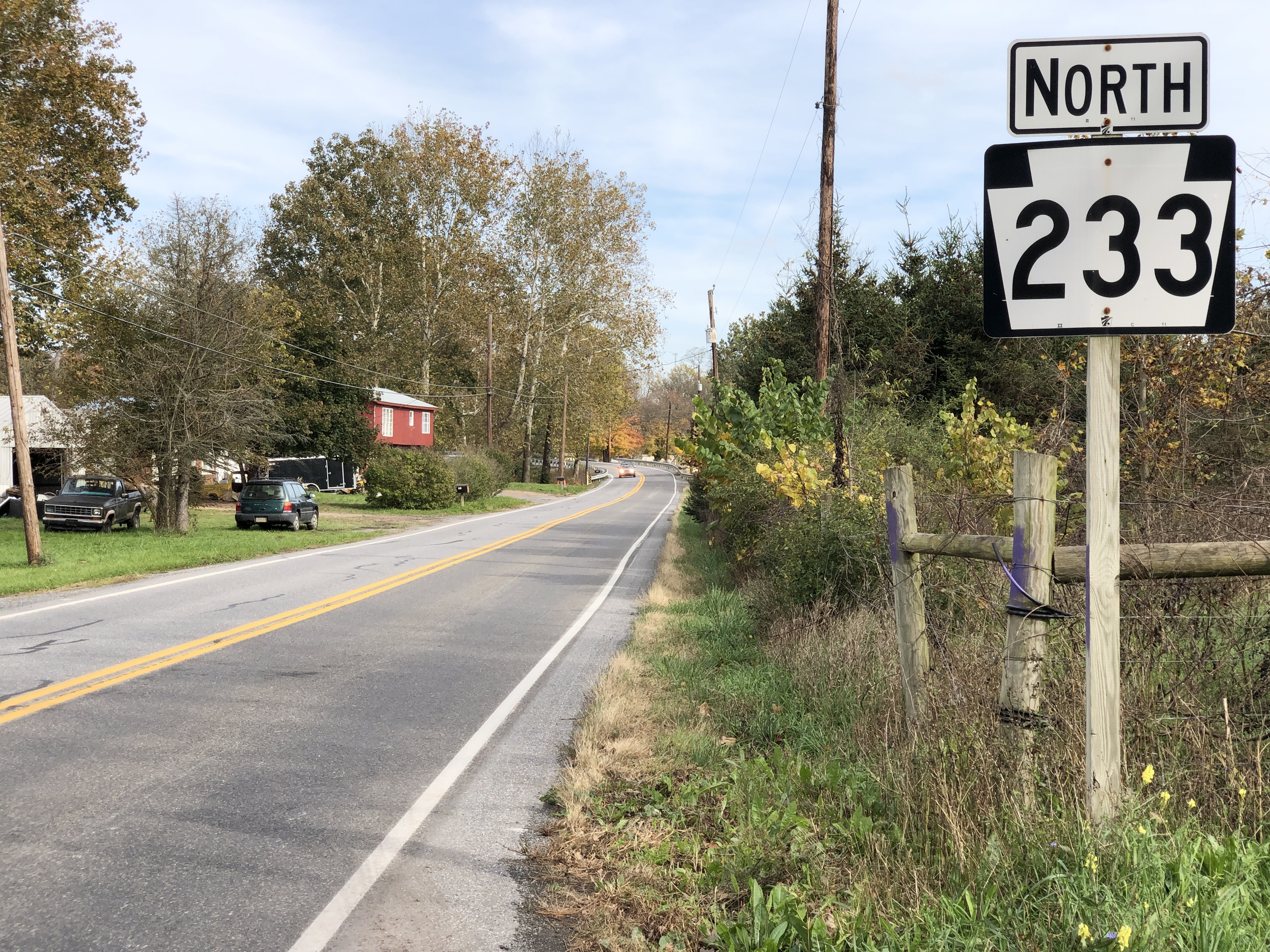
PA 233 northbound in Tyrone Township

PA 233 heads into Cumberland County and becomes Centerville Road, briefly passing through Southampton Township and South Newton Township before continuing into Cooke Township. The road runs through more mountainous areas of Michaux State Forest, passing near Pine Grove Furnace State Park before reaching the community of Pine Grove Furnace, where it crosses the Appalachian Trail again. At this point, the route turns to the north and runs through more rural areas, turning northwest to leave the state forest and continue through more forested areas. PA 233 curves north again and crosses into Penn Township, passing through more dense forests before heading north-northwest into open agricultural areas with a few homes, running through South Fairview. The road crosses Norfolk Southern's Lurgan Branch railroad line and Yellow Breeches Creek prior to running through more farmland with some woods and residences, reaching a junction with PA 174 in Dickinson. From here, the route turns northwest through more farm fields, reaching an interchange with I-81. A park and ride lot is located northwest of this interchange. Past this, PA 233 continues through more rural areas as it comes to an intersection with US 11.

At this point, the road crosses into West Pennsboro Township and passes through more agricultural areas with occasional patches of woodland and residences. The route passes over the Cumberland Valley Rail Trail and becomes the border between the borough of Newville to the west and West Pennsboro Township to the east before fully entering Newville at the crossing of the Big Spring Creek. Here, PA 233 becomes South High Street and passes homes, intersecting PA 533 prior to heading into the commercial downtown and crossing PA 641. Past this junction, the route becomes North High Street and passes more residences along with a few businesses. The route heads into North Newton Township and becomes Doubling Gap Road, running through farmland and woodland with some homes. PA 233 crosses the Conodoguinet Creek into Lower Mifflin Township and curves north through more agricultural areas, coming to a bridge over I-76 (Pennsylvania Turnpike). From here, the road winds north through farmland with some woods and residences, turning to the northwest. Farther northwest, the route intersects the western terminus of PA 944 before reaching the northern terminus of PA 997 near McCrea. PA 233 curves north through into more wooded areas with some farms and homes. The road turns northeast and heads into forested areas at the base of Blue Mountain that are a part of the Tuscarora State Forest, passing near Colonel Denning State Park before ascending the mountain.

At the summit of Blue Mountain, PA 233 passes through Doubling Gap and crosses into Southwest Madison Township in Perry County, leaving the Tuscarora State Forest boundaries and descending the forested mountain as it continues northeast. The route heads into woodland with some farm fields and homes, heading into Tyrone Township. The road runs through more agricultural areas as it heads more to the east and crosses Shermans Creek. PA 233 passes homes and comes into the borough of Landisburg, reaching an intersection with PA 850. At this point, PA 233 turns northwest to form a concurrency with PA 850 on Carlisle Street, passing more residences. The road crosses back into Tyrone Township and becomes unnamed, heading north through farmland with some homes. PA 850 splits from PA 233 by heading to the northwest, and PA 233 continues northeast on Green Park Road, running through farms and woods with occasional residences. The route turns north into open agricultural areas with some homes, reaching its northern terminus at PA 274 in Green Park.

== History ==
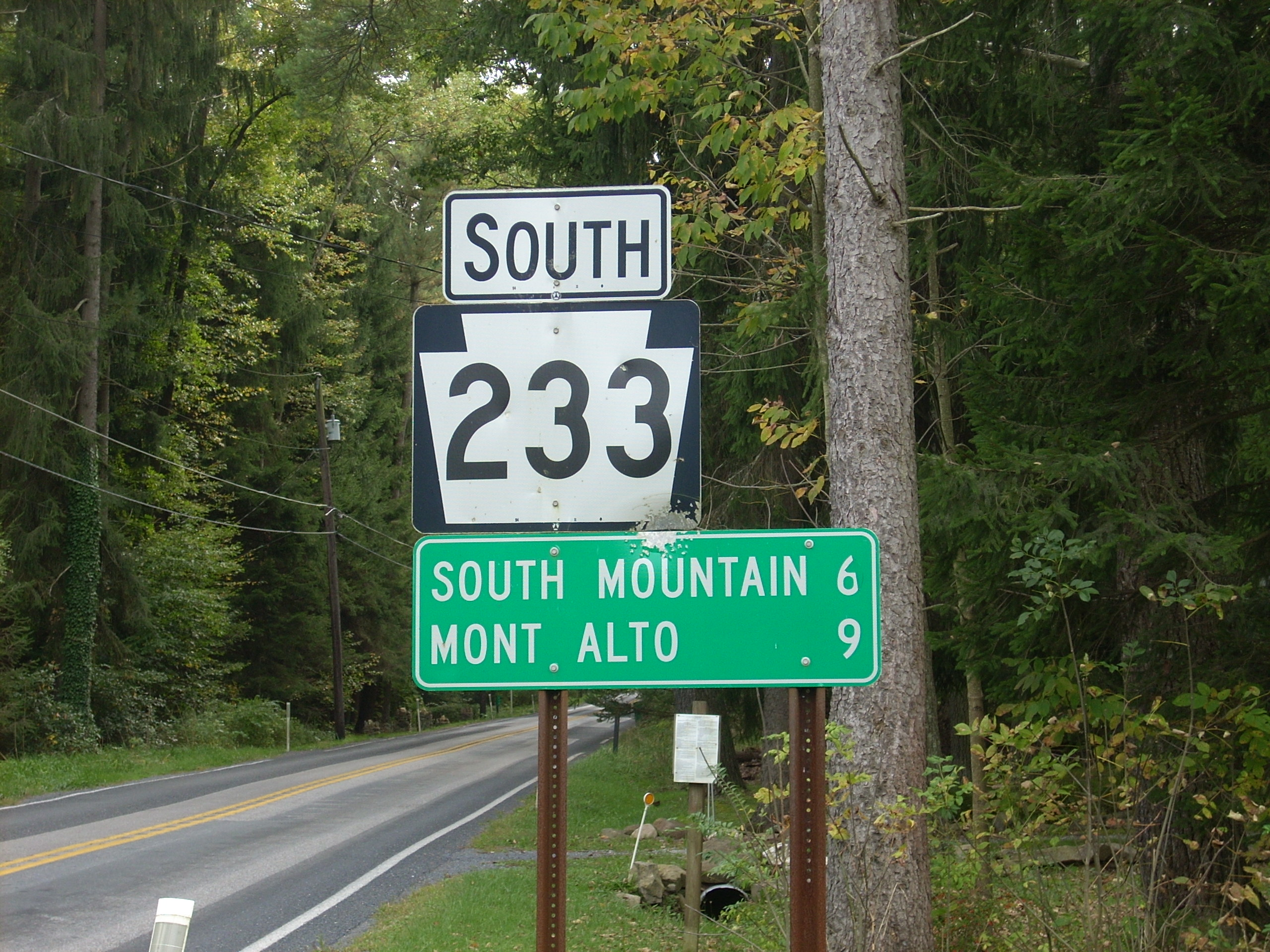
PA 233 southbound in Greene Township

When routes were legislated in Pennsylvania in 1911, what is now PA 233 was designated as part of Legislative Route 191 between Dickinson and Green Park. PA 233 was designated in 1928 to run from US 11 (Walnut Bottom Road) in Dickinson north to PA 33 (now PA 34) in Dromgold, following its current alignment north to Landisburg before it continued to the east. Upon designation, the route was paved between Dickinson and south of Doubling Gap while the remainder north to Dromgold was unpaved. In 1928, the road between Landisburg and Green Park was designated as part of PA 74, which was unpaved. At this time, the road between Mont Alto and US 30 was an unnumbered paved road. By 1930, the section of PA 74 between Landisburg and Green Park was paved. By this time, the roadway between Pine Grove Furnace and Dickinson was an unnumbered unpaved road. PA 233 was extended south from Dickinson to PA 997 in Mont Alto in 1937. In 1937, PA 233 was realigned at Landisburg to head north to PA 17 in Ickesburg, following its current alignment to Green Park before continuing north to Ickesburg. The realigned PA 233 replaced a section of PA 74 between Landisburg and Ickesburg while the former alignment of PA 233 between Landisburg and Dromgold became part of an extended PA 850.

The entire length of the route was paved in the 1930s with the exception of a portion to the north of Doubling Gap. In the 1940s, the north end of PA 233 was cut back to its current location at PA 274 in Green Park, with the section immediately to the north of PA 274 becoming unnumbered Green Park Road and the remainder of the road between north of Green Park and Ickesburg becoming a northern extension of PA 74. The section of the route north of Doubling Gap was paved and straightened in the 1940s.

== Major intersections ==
County	Location	mi	km	Destinations	Notes
Franklin	Mont Alto	0.000	0.000	PA 997 (Main Street/Anthony Highway) – Quincy, Waynesboro, Pond Bank	Southern terminus of PA 233
Franklin	Greene Township	8.816	14.188	US 30 (Lincoln Highway) – Chambersburg, Gettysburg	
Adams	No major junctions				
Cumberland	Penn Township	28.659	46.122	PA 174 (Walnut Bottom Road) – Centerville, Mooredale	
Cumberland	Penn Township	30.071– 30.088	48.395– 48.422	I-81 – Chambersburg, Carlisle	I-81 exit 37
Cumberland	Penn Township	31.222	50.247	US 11 (Ritner Highway) – Shippensburg, Carlisle	
Cumberland	Newville	33.938	54.618	PA 533 west (Fairfield Street) – Shippensburg	Eastern terminus of PA 533
Cumberland	Newville	34.165	54.983	PA 641 (Main Street) to Penna Turnpike	
Cumberland	Lower Mifflin Township	38.963	62.705	PA 944 east (Enola Road) – Enola	Western terminus of PA 944
Cumberland	Lower Mifflin Township	39.541	63.635	PA 997 south (Roxbury Road) – Roxbury	Northern terminus of PA 997
Perry	Landisburg	50.590	81.417	PA 850 east (Main Street) – Carlisle	Southern end of PA 850 concurrency
Perry	Tyrone Township	51.445	82.793	PA 850 west – Loysville	Northern end of PA 850 concurrency
Perry	Tyrone Township	53.257	85.709	PA 274 (Shermans Valley Road) – Blain, New Bloomfield	Northern terminus of PA 233
1.000 mi = 1.609 km; 1.000 km = 0.621 mi: Concurrency terminus
