= Pennsylvania Route 274 =

State highway in Pennsylvania, US

Pennsylvania Route 274

Route information
- Maintained by PennDOT
- Length: 43.988 mi (70.792 km)

Major junctions
- West end: PA 75 in Fannett Township
- PA 17 in Blain; PA 850 in Tyrone Township; PA 233 in Green Park; PA 74 in Green Park; PA 34 from New Bloomfield to Mecks Corner
- East end: US 11 / US 15 in Duncannon

Location
- Country: United States
- State: Pennsylvania
- Counties: Franklin, Perry

Highway system
- Pennsylvania State Route System; Interstate; US; State; Scenic; Legislative
← PA 272	→ I-276

Pennsylvania Route 274 (PA 274) is a 44-mile-long (71 km) state highway located in Franklin and Perry counties in Pennsylvania. The western terminus is at PA 75 in the Fannett Township community of Doylesburg. The eastern terminus is at an interchange with U.S. Route 11 (US 11)/US 15 in Duncannon. PA 274 is a two-lane undivided road that runs through rural areas in the Ridge-and-Valley Appalachians. The route heads northeast and crosses Conococheague Mountain, at which point it leaves Franklin County for Perry County. PA 274 continues through agricultural valleys and intersects PA 17 in Blain, PA 850 in Loysville and PA 233 and PA 74 in Green Park. In New Bloomfield, PA 274 intersects PA 34 and turns southeast for a concurrency with that route to Mecks Corner. From here, the route continues east to Duncannon.

PA 274 was designated in 1928 to run from PA 75 in Doylesburg east to PA 5 (now PA 34) in New Bloomfield while PA 5 was designated onto the road between New Bloomfield and Duncannon, running concurrent with PA 33 between Mecks Corner and Duncannon. In 1937, PA 274 was extended east from New Bloomfield to PA 14 (later US 11/US 15) in Duncannon, replacing those portions of PA 5 and PA 33. The eastern terminus at US 11/US 15 was rebuilt into an interchange in the 1950s.

== Route description ==
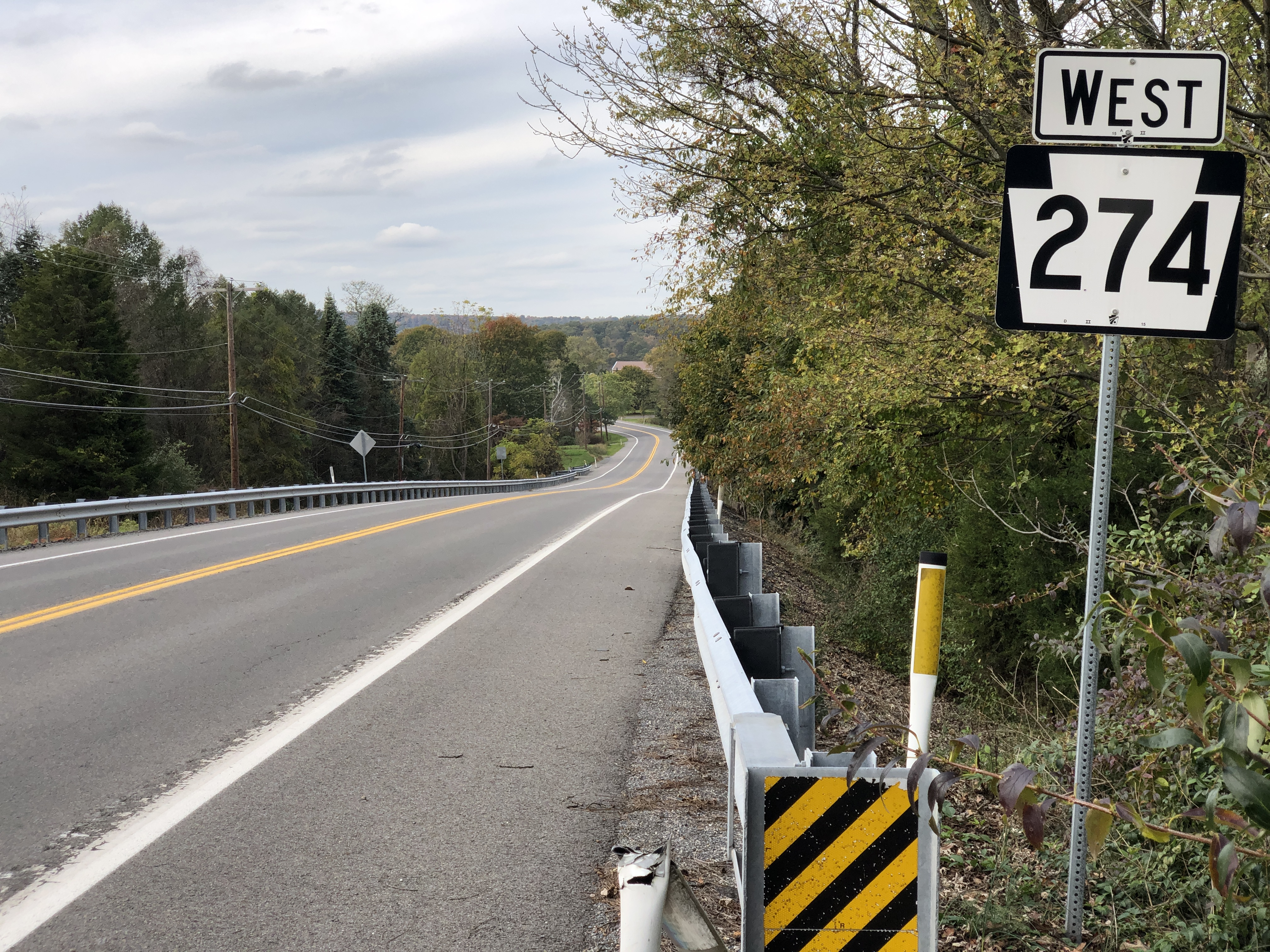
PA 274 westbound in Wheatfield Township

PA 274 begins at an intersection with PA 75 in the community of Doylesburg in Fannett Township, Franklin County, heading northeast on two-lane undivided Big Spring Road. The road heads through a mix of farmland and woodland with some homes before ascending forested Conococheague Mountain. The route heads into the Tuscarora State Forest and enters Toboyne Township in Perry County and becomes an unnamed road, making a hairpin turn to the southwest before another hairpin turn to the northeast to descend the mountain, passing by Big Spring State Park. PA 274 runs through more of Tuscarora State Forest before leaving the forest boundaries and heading into open agricultural areas with some homes, passing through New Germantown. The road enters Jackson Township and becomes Mt. Pleasant Road, coming to Mt. Pleasant and becoming an unnamed road again. The route heads into the borough of Blain and passes homes, reaching an intersection with PA 17 and turns southeast onto Main Street. PA 274 curves to the east and heads back into Jackson Township, turning northeast into more open farmland as an unnamed road. The road crosses into Southwest Madison Township and curves more to the east, running through Andersonburg. The route heads through more rural areas and passes through Cisna Run and Centar. PA 274 heads through farmland with some woods to the south as it continues into Northeast Madison Township and intersects PA 850 in Fort Robinson.

At this point, PA 274 forms a concurrency with PA 850 and the two routes head east on Shermans Valley Road, passing through a mix of farms and woods and crossing into Tyrone Township. The road heads through agricultural areas with some homes before coming into the community of Loysville, where PA 850 splits from PA 274 by heading to the southeast. From here, the route heads east-northeast through areas of farms with homes, coming to an intersection with the northern terminus of PA 233 in Green Park. A short distance later, the road heads into Spring Township and crosses PA 74. Past this intersection, PA 274 heads south of West Perry High School and continues through more agricultural areas with some residences, passing through Elliottsburg and Dunn. The road enters Centre Township and continues through more rural areas.

The route heads into the borough of New Bloomfield and becomes West Main Street, passing homes. PA 274 heads into the downtown area and comes to a traffic circle adjacent to the Perry County Courthouse, where it intersects PA 34. At this point, PA 34 continues east on Main Street and PA 274 turns south to join PA 34 on South Carlisle Street, running past more residences. The road turns east to head back into Centre Township and become Spring Road, winding southeast through farms, woods, and residences. PA 34/PA 274 becomes the border between Carroll Township to the west and Wheatfield Township to the east, heading through agricultural areas with a few homes before continuing into forests. In Mecks Corner, PA 274 splits from PA 34 by heading southeast onto Bloomfield Road into Wheatfield Township, soon curving to the northeast. The route heads through wooded areas with some fields and homes, turning east. The road continues through more agricultural areas with some woodland and residences, heading southeast and passing through Roseglen. PA 274 enters Penn Township and heads through more rural areas with some residential development. The route becomes the border between the borough of Duncannon to the north and Penn Township to the south before ending at an interchange with the US 11/US 15 freeway, where the road also crosses the Appalachian Trail. From here, the road continues northeast into Duncannon as South Market Street, a local street.

== History ==
When routes were legislated in Pennsylvania in 1911, what is now PA 274 was designated as Legislative Route 122 between Doylesburg and New Bloomfield and as part of Legislative Route 30 between New Bloomfield and Duncannon. PA 274 was designated in 1928 to run from PA 75 in Doylesburg east to PA 5 (now PA 34) in New Bloomfield. The same year, the road between New Bloomfield and Duncannon was designated as part of PA 5, which ran concurrent with PA 33 between Mecks Corner and Duncannon. Upon designation, PA 274 was paved between east of Blain and New Bloomfield while the section of PA 5 between New Bloomfield and Duncannon was paved. By 1930, the route was paved between west of New Germantown and east of Blain. In 1937, PA 274 was extended east to PA 14 (later US 11/US 15) at Market Street in Duncannon, replacing the section of PA 5 between New Bloomfield and Duncannon and PA 33 between Mecks Corner and Duncannon. At this time, the entire length of the route was paved. In the 1950s, the eastern terminus at US 11/US 15 was rebuilt into an interchange as part of construction of a bypass carrying US 11/US 15 around Duncannon.

== Major intersections ==
County	Location	mi	km	Destinations	Notes
Franklin	Fannett Township	0.000	0.000	PA 75 (Path Valley Road) – Dry Run, Spring Run, Willow Hill	Western terminus
Perry	Blain	14.429	23.221	PA 17 east (Main Street) – Kistler, Millerstown	Western terminus of PA 17
Perry	Northeast Madison Township	22.067	35.513	PA 850 west – Kistler	West end of PA 850 concurrency
Perry	Tyrone Township	24.108	38.798	PA 850 east – Landisburg, Carlisle	East end of PA 850 concurrency
Perry	Tyrone Township	26.139	42.067	PA 233 south (Green Park Road) – Landisburg	Northern terminus of PA 233
Perry	Spring Township	26.582	42.780	PA 74 (Veterans Way/Waggoners Gap Road) – Ickesburg, Carlisle	
Perry	New Bloomfield	33.457	53.844	PA 34 north (Main Street) – Newport	Traffic circle; west end of PA 34 concurrency
Perry	Carroll Township	36.841	59.290	PA 34 south (Spring Road) – Carlisle	East end of PA 34 concurrency
Perry	Duncannon	43.951– 43.988	70.732– 70.792	US 11 / US 15 – Sunbury, Harrisburg	Interchange; eastern terminus
1.000 mi = 1.609 km; 1.000 km = 0.621 mi: Concurrency terminus
