= Pennsylvania Route 17 =

State highway in Perry County, Pennsylvania, US

Pennsylvania Route 17

Route information
- Maintained by PennDOT
- Length: 35.689 mi (57.436 km)

Major junctions
- West end: PA 274 in Blain
- PA 850 in Kistler; PA 74 in Ickesburg; US 22 / US 322 in Millerstown; PA 235 near Liverpool
- East end: US 11 / US 15 in Liverpool

Location
- Country: United States
- State: Pennsylvania
- Counties: Perry

Highway system
- Pennsylvania State Route System; Interstate; US; State; Scenic; Legislative
← PA 16	→ PA 18

Pennsylvania Route 17 (PA 17) is a state highway located entirely in Perry County, Pennsylvania. The route is 35.7 miles (57.5 km) long and is signed east and west. The western terminus of the route is at PA 274 in Blain. The eastern terminus is at U.S. Route 11 (US 11)/US 15 in Liverpool. PA 17 is a two-lane undivided road that runs through agricultural valleys in the northern part of Perry County. The route heads northeast from Blain and intersects PA 850 in Kistler and PA 74 in Ickesburg. PA 17 crosses the Juniata River into Millerstown, where it has indirect access to the US 22/US 322 freeway. From here, the route continues east and intersects PA 235 before it comes to its terminus in Liverpool. PA 17 was designated in 1928 to run from US 22 (Market Street) in Millerstown east to US 11 in Liverpool while PA 74 was designated onto the section of road between Ickesburg and Millerstown. In the 1930s, PA 17 was extended southwest from Millerstown to PA 274 in Blain, replacing the portion of PA 74 between Ickesburg and Millerstown.

== Route description ==
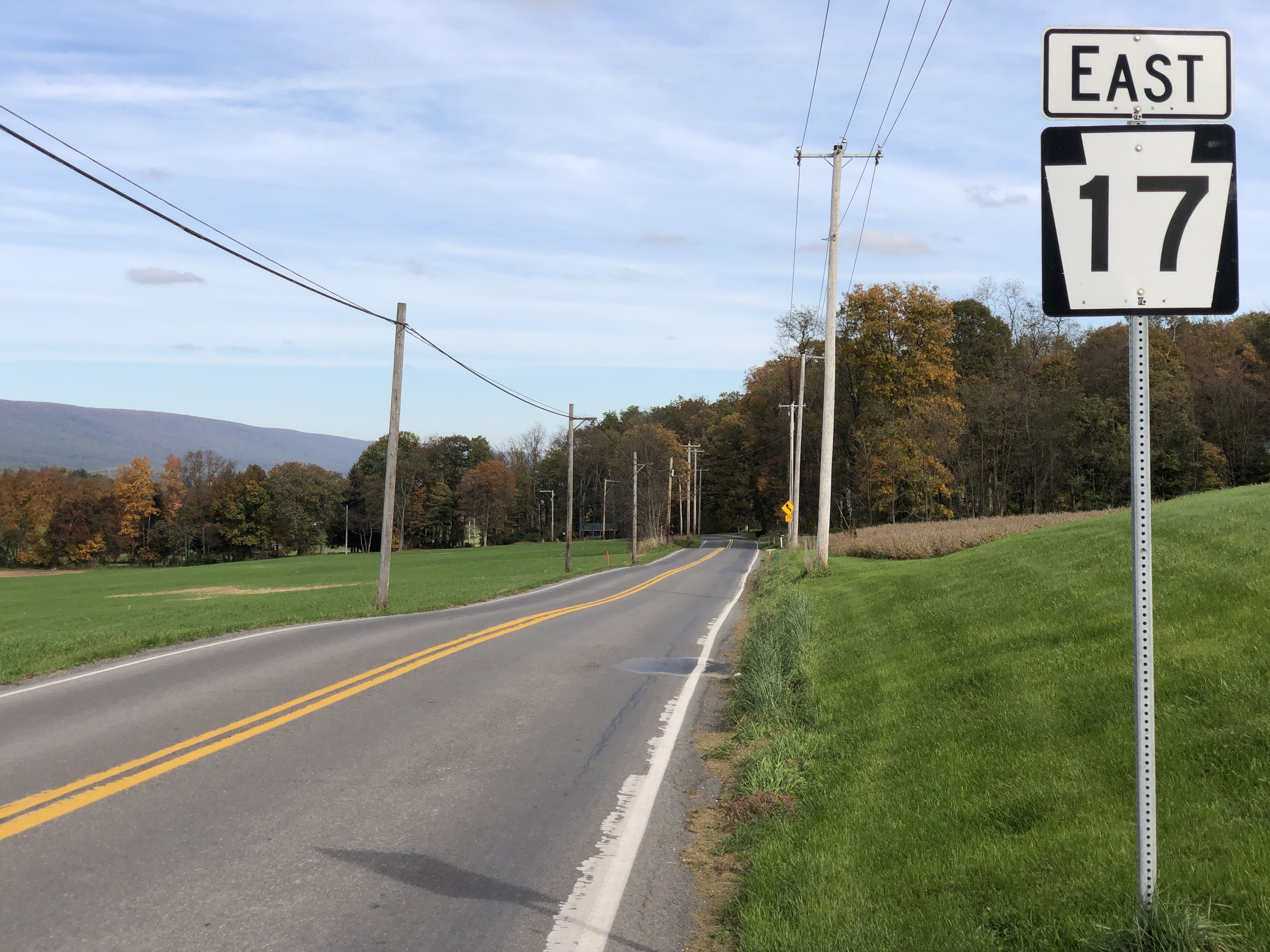
PA 17 eastbound in Saville Township

PA 17 begins in the borough of Blain at the intersection of PA 274, heading northwest on a two-lane undivided road. The route passes homes and turns north, crossing into Jackson Township. The road heads into open agricultural areas with a few homes, curving to the northeast. PA 17 crosses into Southwest Madison Township and runs through more farmland with some woods and residences, passing through Hench and Stony Point. The route turns east and enters Northeast Madison Township, coming to Pine Grove and curving northeast again. The road forms a brief concurrency with PA 850 in Kistler and becomes Tuscarora Path, running through more agricultural areas with occasional homes and heading more to the north. PA 17 curves northeast and heads into Saville Township, passing through more rural areas. The route curves northwest before turning northeast onto Raccoon Valley Road and heading into the residential community of Ickesburg, where it crosses PA 74. Past here, the road runs through more farmland with some woods, crossing into Tuscarora Township. In this area, PA 17 runs through wooded areas with some fields before heading into a narrow agricultural valley with a few homes. The route runs through more rural areas, passing through Donnally Mills and Gramere.

The route crosses a bridge over Norfolk Southern's Pittsburgh Line and the Juniata River and then passes under the US 22/US 322 freeway as it enters the borough of Millerstown and becomes West Sunbury Street. The route passes businesses in the center of town before continuing into residential areas as East Sunbury Street, passing south of Greenwood High School. The route continues into Greenwood Township and becomes Sunbury Path, as noted by open farmland. The road crosses the Cocolamus Creek and runs through more agricultural areas with some woods and homes. PA 17 passes through more open farmland as it continues into Liverpool Township. The route, bearing the name of Pennsylvania Route 17 in this area, cuts through forested areas and later through a gap in Wildcat Ridge. Next, the route turns east through more woods and comes to a junction with PA 235. From this junction east, PA 235 runs concurrently with PA 17, as both routes continue south before entering the borough of Liverpool and terminating at US 11/US 15.

== History ==
When routes were first legislated in Pennsylvania in 1911, the present alignment of PA 17 between Ickesburg and Millerstown was designated as part of Legislative Route 191 while the road between Millerstown and Liverpool was designated as Legislative Route 293. PA 17 was first designated in 1928 on its current alignment between US 22 (Market Street) in Millerstown and US 11 in Liverpool. At this time, the entire length of the route was paved. The same year, the road between Ickesburg and US 22 in Millerstown was designated as part of PA 74, which was unpaved. By 1930, PA 74 was under construction between Ickesburg and northeast of Marsh Run and between southwest of Donnally Mills and Millerstown. By this time, the road between Blain and Kistler and to the west of Ickesburg was an unnumbered unpaved road. In the 1930s, PA 17 was extended southwest from Millerstown to PA 274 in Blain along its current alignment, replacing the section of PA 74 between Ickesburg and Millerstown. At this time, the entire length of the route was paved. No major changes have occurred since then.

== Major intersections ==
The entire route is in Perry County.

Location	mi	km	Destinations	Notes
Blain	0.000	0.000	PA 274 (Main Street) – Fort Loudon, New Bloomfield	Western terminus of PA 17
Northeast Madison Township	5.907	9.506	PA 850 (Fort Robinson Road) – Loysville, Honey Grove	
Saville Township	12.562	20.217	PA 74 (Veterans Way) – Port Royal, Landisburg, New Bloomfield	
Millerstown	25.011	40.251	Market Street to US 22 / US 322 – Lewistown, Harrisburg	
Liverpool Township	34.024	54.756	PA 235 north – Seven Stars, East Salem	End of signage for PA 235, PA 235 concurrency with PA 17 begins east of intersection
Liverpool	35.689	57.436	US 11 / US 15 (Susquehanna Trail) – Selinsgrove, Williamsport, Harrisburg	Official eastern terminus of PA 17 and southern terminus of PA 235
1.000 mi = 1.609 km; 1.000 km = 0.621 mi: Concurrency terminus
