= Pennsylvania Route 850 =

State highway in Pennsylvania, US

Pennsylvania Route 850

Route information
- Maintained by PennDOT
- Length: 44.890 mi (72.243 km)

Major junctions
- West end: PA 35 in Tuscarora Township
- PA 75 in Tuscarora Township; PA 17 in Northeast Madison Township; PA 274 in Northeast Madison Township to Tyrone Township; PA 233 from Tyrone Township to Landisburg; PA 74 in Spring Township; PA 34 in Carroll Township
- East end: US 11 / US 15 in Marysville

Location
- Country: United States
- State: Pennsylvania
- Counties: Juniata, Perry

Highway system
- Pennsylvania State Route System; Interstate; US; State; Scenic; Legislative
← PA 849	→ PA 851

Pennsylvania Route 850 (PA 850) is a 44-mile-long (71 km) state highway located in Juniata and Perry counties in Pennsylvania. The western terminus is at PA 35 in Tuscarora Township. The eastern terminus is at U.S. Route 11 (US 11)/US 15 in Marysville. PA 850 is a two-lane undivided road that runs through rural areas in the Ridge-and-Valley Appalachians. The route heads southeast from PA 35 and crosses PA 75 in Honey Grove before it traverses Tuscarora Mountain and leaves Juniata County for Perry County. PA 850 continues southeast and crosses PA 17 in Kistler before running east concurrent with PA 274 between Fort Robinson and Loysville. The route turns back to the southeast and heads south concurrent with PA 233 into Landisburg. PA 850 heads east, crossing PA 74 in Alinda before following PA 34 southeast between Dromgold and Shermans Dale. From here, the route continues east to its terminus in Marysville. PA 850 was designated in 1928 to run from PA 274 in Fort Robinson northwest to Kistler, with the road between Landisburg and Dromgold designated as part of PA 233. In 1937, the route was extended to its current length between PA 35 in Tuscarora Township and PA 14 (now US 11/US 15) in Marysville, replacing the portion of PA 233 between Landisburg and Dromgold.

== Route description ==
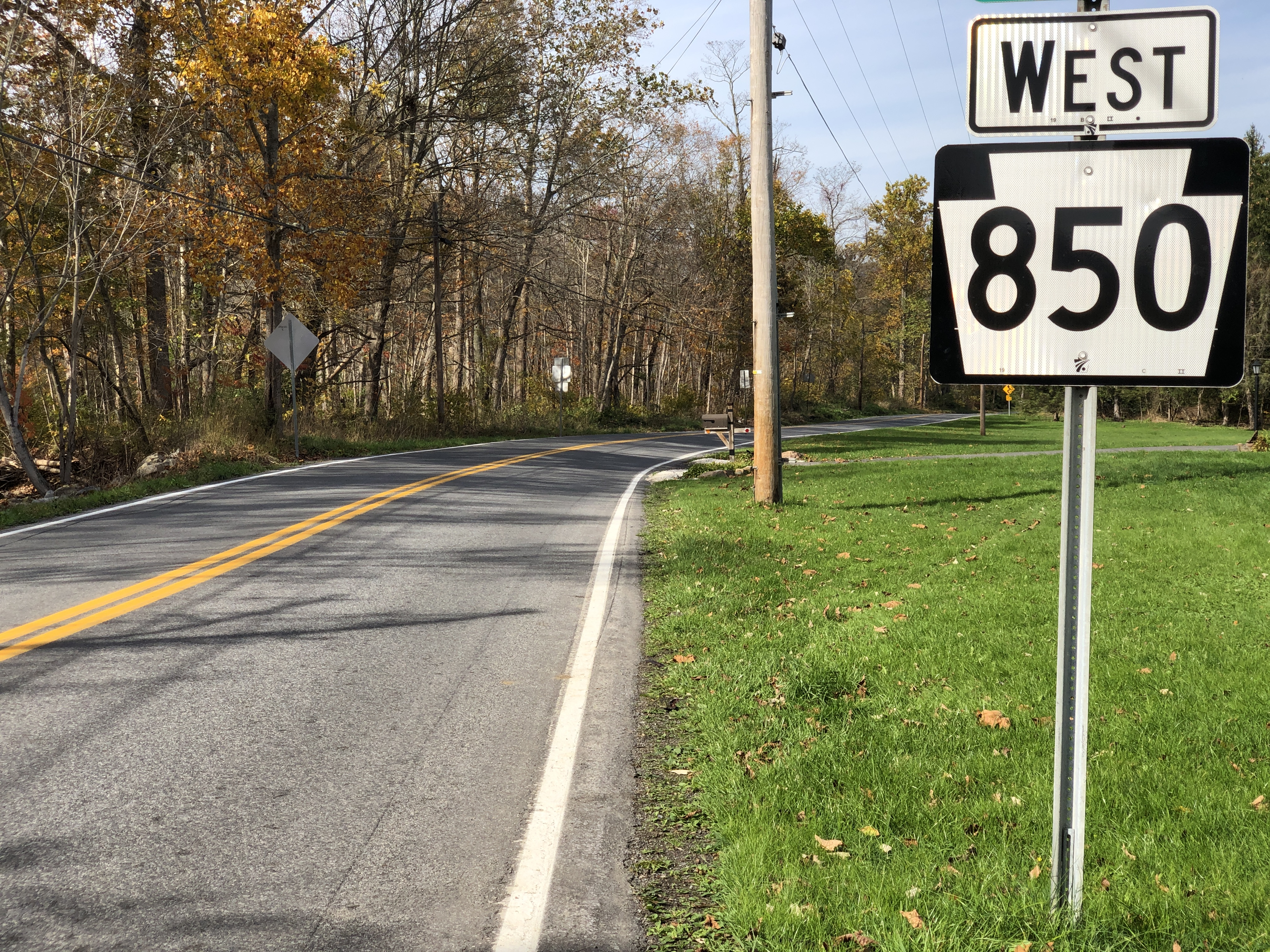
PA 850 westbound past PA 75 in Honey Grove

PA 850 begins at an intersection with PA 35 in Tuscarora Township, Juniata County, heading southeast on a two-lane undivided road. The route passes through farm fields with some woodland before heading into more wooded areas and turning to the northeast. The road comes to McCullochs Mills and curves southeast again, heading through more woodland with a few farms and residences. PA 850 turns northeast and then southeast again, crossing the Tuscarora Creek. PA 850 comes to an intersection with PA 75 in the community of Honey Grove, where it briefly turns south to form a concurrency with that route and cross Laurel Run, before heading southeast into forested areas and crossing through a gap in Tuscarora Mountain, turning to the northeast.

PA 850 crosses into Northeast Madison Township in Perry County and runs east through more forests with a few agricultural clearings and residences, passing through Walsingham. The road curves south and then northeast again as it traverses another portion of Tuscarora Mountain, passing through a tract of Tuscarora State Forest. The route turns south into open agricultural areas, heading more to the southeast as it comes to a junction with PA 17 in Kistler. PA 850 winds southeast through a mix of farmland and woodland with some homes, passing through Bixler. In Fort Robinson, the route comes to an intersection with PA 274. At this point, PA 274 forms a concurrency with PA 850 and the two routes head east on Shermans Valley Road, passing through a mix of farms and woods and crossing into Tyrone Township. The road heads through agricultural areas with some homes before coming into the community of Loysville, where PA 850 splits from PA 274 by heading to the southeast. The route heads south past homes prior to turning east out of Loysville and running through farmland with some woods and residences. The road turns to the south and comes to an intersection with PA 233. Here, PA 850 heads south along with PA 233 through more farmland along with some homes. The road crosses into the borough of Landisburg and becomes Carlisle Street, passing homes. In the center of town, PA 233 turns to the west and PA 850 turns east onto Main Street, running past more residences.

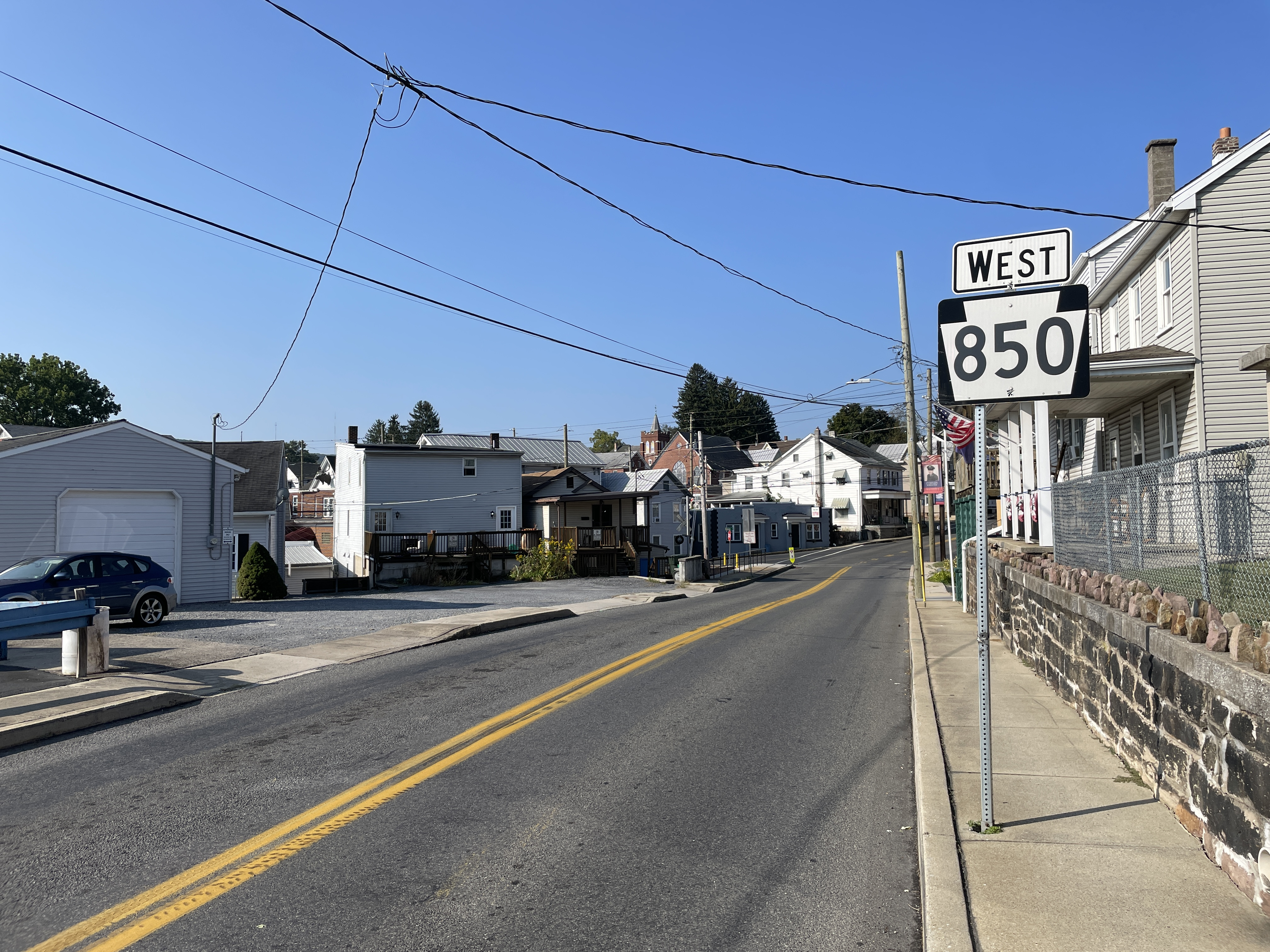
PA 850 westbound past US 11/US 15 in Marysville

The road heads back into Tyrone Township and becomes Landisburg Road, entering open agricultural areas. The route soon crosses into Spring Township and intersects PA 74 in Alinda. Here, PA 850 runs through more farmland with a few homes, turning southeast. The road heads into forested areas and turns northeast in Falling Spring, running a short distance to the north of the Shermans Creek. The route heads east and enters Carroll Township, coming to an intersection with PA 34 in Dromgold. At this point, PA 34 and PA 850 form a concurrency and continue southeast on Spring Road, passing farm fields and woods with homes as it runs east of the creek. The road crosses Shermans Creek and heads into business areas, with PA 850 splitting from PA 34 at a roundabout in Shermans Dale by heading east on Valley Road. The route runs through farmland and woodland with some homes in a valley, crossing into Rye Township. PA 850 continues through more rural valley areas, passing through Grier Point, crossing the Appalachian Trail, and running through Keystone. Residential developments near the road increase as it heads through Glenvale and turns to the east-northeast. PA 850 enters the borough of Marysville and becomes Valley Street, passing homes and coming to its eastern terminus at US 11/US 15.

== History ==
When Pennsylvania first legislated routes in 1911, what is now PA 850 was not assigned a number. PA 850 was designated in 1928 to run from PA 274 in Fort Robinson northwest to Kistler along an unpaved road. The same year, the section of the current route between Landisburg and Dromgold was designated as the northernmost portion of PA 233, which was unpaved. By 1930, the section of the present route between Shermans Dale and Marysville was an unnumbered unpaved road, with a short paved section to the west of Marysville. In 1937, PA 850 was extended west from Kistler to PA 35 in Tuscarora Township and was extended east from Fort Robinson to PA 14 (now US 11/US 15) in Marysville. The route replaced the portion of PA 233 between Landisburg and Dromgold. The entire length of the route was paved in the 1930s. On July 20, 2020, construction began to build a roundabout at the intersection with PA 34 in Shermans Dale. The roundabout opened to traffic on October 22, 2021.

== Major intersections ==
County	Location	mi	km	Destinations	Notes
Juniata	Tuscarora Township	0.000	0.000	PA 35 – Shade Gap, Mifflintown	Western terminus
Juniata	Tuscarora Township	5.058	8.140	PA 75 north – Port Royal	West end of PA 75 overlap
Juniata	Tuscarora Township	5.085	8.184	PA 75 south – East Waterford, Fort Loudon	East end of PA 75 overlap
Perry	Northeast Madison Township	13.875	22.330	PA 17 (Tuscarora Path/Blain Road) – Ickesburg, Blain	
Perry	Northeast Madison Township	17.872	28.762	PA 274 west – Blain	West end of PA 274 overlap
Perry	Tyrone Township	19.912	32.045	PA 274 east (Shermans Valley Road) – New Bloomfield	East end of PA 274 overlap
Perry	Tyrone Township	21.984	35.380	PA 233 north (Green Park Road) – Greenpark	West end of PA 233 overlap
Perry	Landisburg	22.838	36.754	PA 233 south (Doubling Gap Road) – Newville	East end of PA 233 overlap
Perry	Spring Township	24.091	38.771	PA 74 (Waggoners Gap Road) – Ickesburg, Carlisle	
Perry	Carroll Township	29.427	47.358	PA 34 north (Spring Road) – New Bloomfield, Newport	West end of PA 34 overlap
Perry	Carroll Township	31.875	51.298	PA 34 south (Spring Road) – Carlisle	Roundabout; east end of PA 34 overlap
Perry	Marysville	44.890	72.243	US 11 / US 15 (State Road) to I-81 – Duncannon, Harrisburg	Eastern terminus
1.000 mi = 1.609 km; 1.000 km = 0.621 mi: Concurrency terminus
