= Hoverter and Sholl Box Huckleberry Natural Area =

Natural area in Pennsylvania, U.S.

- Location within Pennsylvania Location within the United States
- Location: Perry County, Pennsylvania
- Nearest town: New Bloomfield
- Coordinates: 40°24′22″N 77°10′26″W
- Area: 10 acres (4.0 ha)

U.S. National Natural Landmark
- Designated: 1967

Hoverter and Sholl Box Huckleberry Natural Area is a 10-acre (4.0 ha) natural area in Perry County, Pennsylvania, near New Bloomfield, which protects a colony of box huckleberry over 1,000 years old. The smallest Natural Area in Pennsylvania, it is administered as part of Tuscarora State Forest. It was designated a National Natural Landmark in April 1967.

== Topography ==
A 0.25-mile (0.40 km) path forms a loop around the site, which is located on the west side of a hill slope. Twenty-seven interpretive stations are located along the trail. In addition to the low growth of the box huckleberry itself, the hillside is covered with white pine and oak forest, with a scattering of other trees and various wildflowers.

== History ==
The specimen of box huckleberry at the natural area has been estimated, based on its observed rate of growth and clonal reproduction, to be 1,200 to 1,300 years old, only a tenth of the estimated age for a nearby colony at Losh Run. The colony was discovered by Spencer Baird in 1845. No specimens of box huckleberry had been collected since 1805, and Baird's discovery allowed Asa Gray to classify the species as Gaylussacia brachycera. The resulting correspondence sparked a lifelong friendship between the two, and helped Baird attain a post at the Smithsonian Institution.

The box huckleberry remained largely obscure until 1918, when Frederick V. Coville examined the site. On the basis of his observations there, he concluded that box huckleberry was self-sterile and spread clonally. After commercial nurserymen removed a truckload of plants from the site, Coville called attention to its plight with an article in Science. Renewed interest sparked the discovery of other box huckleberry colonies elsewhere in the Appalachians.

The New Bloomfield site was first protected with the donation of 4 acres (1.6 ha) to the state in 1929, the beginning of the Natural Area.
