= PA17 =

PA17 may refer to:

- Pennsylvania Route 17
- Pennsylvania's 17th congressional district
- Piper PA-17 Vagabond light aircraft
