= Pennsylvania State Game Lands Number 256 =

Park in the United States

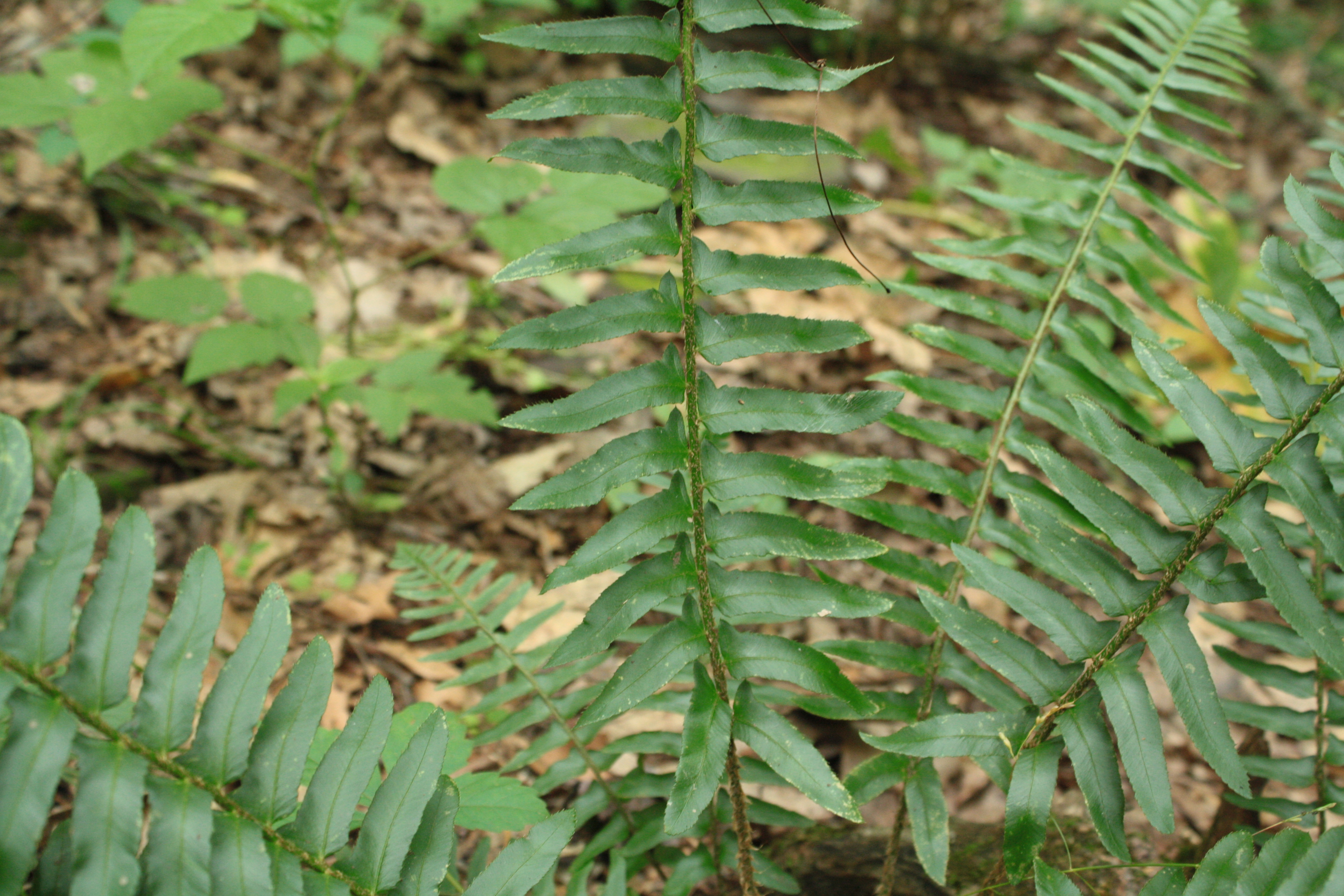
- Ferns in the area.

- Location within Pennsylvania
- Location: Centre Township and Wheatfield Township both in Perry County
- Nearest city: Dellville, New Bloomfield
- Coordinates: 40°24′0″N 77°7′59″W
- Area: 1,254 acres (507 ha)
- Designation: Pennsylvania State Game Lands
- Owner: Pennsylvania Game Commission

State Game Lands No. 256 consists of 1,254 acres, located in Perry County east of New Bloomfield, Pennsylvania, United States. The terrain is gently rolling woodland broken by numerous small drainages. The most common game species found here are deer, wild turkey, grouse, and eastern gray squirrel.
