= Perry County, Pennsylvania =

County in the United States

- County
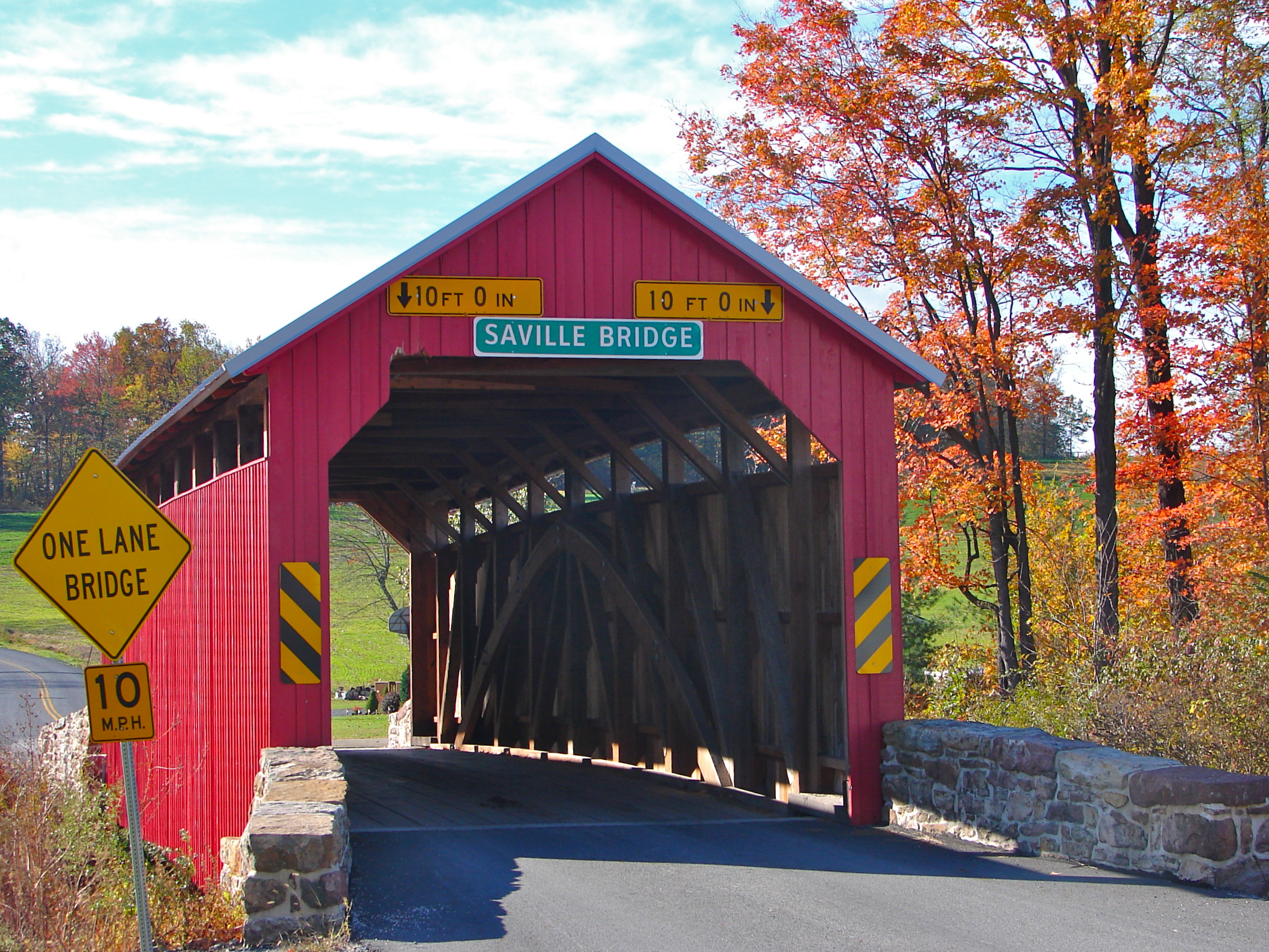
- Saville Covered Bridge in Saville Township, October 2010

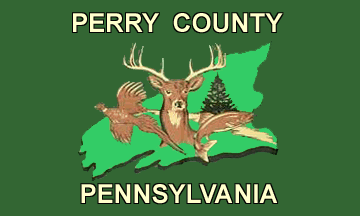
- Flag Logo

- Location within the U.S. state of Pennsylvania
- Coordinates: 40°24′N 77°16′W
- Country: United States
- State: Pennsylvania
- Founded: March 22, 1820
- Named for: Oliver Hazard Perry
- Seat: New Bloomfield
- Largest Borough: Marysville

Area
  - Total: 556 sq mi (1,440 km^{2})
  - Land: 551 sq mi (1,430 km^{2})
  - Water: 4.1 sq mi (11 km^{2}) 0.7%

Population (2020)
  - Total: 45,842
  - Estimate (2025): 46,806 ▲
  - Density: 85/sq mi (33/km^{2})
- Time zone: UTC−5 (Eastern)
  - Summer (DST): UTC−4 (EDT)
- Congressional district: 13th
- Website: www.perryco.org

Perry County is a county in the Commonwealth of Pennsylvania. As of the 2020 census, the population was 45,842. The county seat is New Bloomfield. The county was created on March 22, 1820, and was named for Oliver Hazard Perry, a hero of the War of 1812, who had recently died. It was originally part of Cumberland County and was created in part because residents did not want to travel over the mountain to Carlisle, the county seat of Cumberland County. Landisburg became the temporary county seat before New Bloomfield was ultimately chosen. The county is part of the South Central Pennsylvania region of the state. (Note: Includes Lancaster, York, Berks, Dauphin, Cumberland, Franklin, Lebanon, Adams and Perry Counties) Perry County is included in the Harrisburg–York–Lebanon combined statistical area. The county is served by the 717/223 area codes.

== Geography ==
Green Park, an unincorporated village located in northeastern Tyrone Township, serves as Perry County's midpoint between the Conococheague Mountain in the west and the Susquehanna River to the east.

The county terrain is formed by the folded Appalachian Mountain ridges which run from southwest to northeast across the county. The terrain slopes to the northeast, with its highest point on the Blue Mountain Ridge, which delineates the border between Perry and Cumberland counties. The ridge peaks at 0.83 miles (1.34 km) NE from Perry County's southmost corner; it measures 2,269 ft (692 m) ASL. Perry County is one of the 423 counties served by the Appalachian Regional Commission, and it is identified as part of the "Midlands" by Colin Woodard in his book American Nations: A History of the Eleven Rival Regional Cultures of North America.

The county is drained by the south-flowing Susquehanna River, which forms almost all of its eastern boundary. The Juniata River enters Perry County from Juniata County near Millerstown, and flows southeast to its confluence with the Susquehanna River near Duncannon. The county also contains several creeks, runs, and lakes, which provide recreational and fishing opportunities, formerly powered mills throughout the county, and provided transport venues. To this day, canoeing and kayaking are forms of recreation which utilize the Shermans Creek and other waters in the county.

The county has a total area of 556 square miles (1,440 km^{2}), of which 551 square miles (1,430 km^{2}) is land and 4.1 square miles (11 km^{2}) (0.7%) is water. The Appalachian Trail runs through the town of Duncannon. The county is also famous for being the northern head of the Tuscarora Trail.

Perry County has a hot-summer humid continental climate (Dfa) and average monthly temperatures in New Bloomfield range from 28.5 °F in January to 73.2 °F in July. The hardiness zone is 6b except in Marysville where it is 7a ( ). Common trees include red maple, Virginia pine, oak, eastern white pine, eastern hemlock, birch, shagbark hickory, and juniper, though American sycamore, ironwood (ex: Hop-hornbeam, American Hornbeam), sugar maple, black walnut, elm, alder, black cherry, black locust, and sassafras are also fairly common. Mosses of various species are common sights, especially on fallen tree logs, along streams, on tree trunks, and in sidewalk cracks, usually growing in shaded areas. Ferns also grow along streams and in shaded areas, and are also commonly seen in Perry County woodlands.

=== Adjacent counties ===
- Juniata County - north
- Northumberland County - northeast
- Dauphin County - east
- Cumberland County - south
- Franklin County - southwest

=== Major highways ===
- US 11 / US 15
- US 22 / US 322
- PA 17
- PA 34
- PA 74
- PA 104
- PA 233
- PA 235
- PA 274
- PA 849
- PA 850

=== Protected areas ===
- Big Spring State Forest Picnic Area
- Fowlers Hollow State Park
- Little Buffalo State Park
- Colonel Denning State Park (part)
- Hoverter and Sholl Box Huckleberry Natural Area
- State Game Lands Number 88
- State Game Lands Number 170
- State Game Lands Number 256
- State Game Lands Number 281
- Tuscarora State Forest (part)

== Demographics ==
Historical population
Census	Pop.	Note	%±
1820	11,342		—
1830	14,261		25.7%
1840	17,096		19.9%
1850	20,088		17.5%
1860	22,793		13.5%
1870	25,447		11.6%
1880	27,522		8.2%
1890	26,276		−4.5%
1900	26,263		0.0%
1910	24,136		−8.1%
1920	22,875		−5.2%
1930	21,744		−4.9%
1940	23,213		6.8%
1950	24,782		6.8%
1960	26,582		7.3%
1970	28,615		7.6%
1980	35,718		24.8%
1990	41,172		15.3%
2000	43,602		5.9%
2010	45,969		5.4%
2020	45,842		−0.3%
2025 (est.)	46,806	▲	2.1%
US Decennial Census; 1790–1960 1900–1990; 1990–2000 2010 2020 2025

=== Racial and ethnic composition ===
Perry County, Pennsylvania – Racial and ethnic composition Note: the US Census treats Hispanic/Latino as an ethnic category. This table excludes Latinos from the racial categories and assigns them to a separate category. Hispanics/Latinos may be of any race.
Race / Ethnicity (NH = Non-Hispanic)	Pop 1980	Pop 1990	Pop 2000	Pop 2010	Pop 2020	% 1980	% 1990	% 2000	% 2010	% 2020
White alone (NH)	35,488	40,758	42,772	44,427	42,838	99.36%	98.99%	98.10%	96.65%	93.45%
Black or African American alone (NH)	28	95	182	284	289	0.08%	0.23%	0.42%	0.62%	0.63%
Native American or Alaska Native alone (NH)	15	49	45	58	50	0.04%	0.12%	0.10%	0.13%	0.11%
Asian alone (NH)	32	69	65	163	139	0.09%	0.17%	0.15%	0.35%	0.30%
Native Hawaiian or Pacific Islander alone (NH)	x	x	3	14	3	x	x	0.01%	0.03%	0.01%
Other race alone (NH)	17	7	25	25	139	0.05%	0.02%	0.06%	0.05%	0.30%
Mixed race or Multiracial (NH)	x	x	209	410	1,472	x	x	0.48%	0.89%	3.21%
Hispanic or Latino (any race)	138	194	301	588	912	0.39%	0.47%	0.69%	1.28%	1.99%
Total	35,718	41,172	43,602	45,969	45,842	100.00%	100.00%	100.00%	100.00%	100.00%

=== 2020 census ===
As of the 2020 census, the county had a population of 45,842. The median age was 43.7 years. 21.7% of residents were under the age of 18 and 20.0% of residents were 65 years of age or older. For every 100 females there were 100.3 males, and for every 100 females age 18 and over there were 98.8 males age 18 and over.

The racial makeup of the county was 94.2% White, 0.7% Black or African American, 0.1% American Indian and Alaska Native, 0.3% Asian, <0.1% Native Hawaiian and Pacific Islander, 0.7% from some other race, and 4.0% from two or more races. Hispanic or Latino residents of any race comprised 2.0% of the population.

6.5% of residents lived in urban areas, while 93.5% lived in rural areas.

There were 18,083 households in the county, of which 27.6% had children under the age of 18 living in them. Of all households, 55.0% were married-couple households, 17.4% were households with a male householder and no spouse or partner present, and 20.2% were households with a female householder and no spouse or partner present. About 24.8% of all households were made up of individuals and 11.4% had someone living alone who was 65 years of age or older.

There were 19,842 housing units, of which 8.9% were vacant. Among occupied housing units, 78.8% were owner-occupied and 21.2% were renter-occupied. The homeowner vacancy rate was 1.4% and the rental vacancy rate was 5.5%.

=== 2000 census ===
As of the 2000 United States census, there were 43,602 people, 16,695 households, and 12,320 families in the county. The population density was 79.1 people per square mile (30.5 people/km^{2}). There were 18,941 housing units at an average density of 34.4 units per square mile (13.3/km^{2}). The racial makeup of the county was 98.54% White, 0.43% Black or African American, 0.12% Native American, 0.15% Asian, 0.01% Pacific Islander, 0.21% from other races, and 0.54% from two or more races. 0.69% of the population were Hispanic or Latino of any race. 45.8% were of German, 16.4% American, 7.8% Irish and 5.0% English ancestry. 96.8% spoke English and 1.2% Spanish as their first language.

There were 16,695 households, out of which 33.2% had children under the age of 18 living with them, 61.6% were married couples living together, 7.8% had a female householder with no husband present, and 26.20% were non-families. 21.7% of all households were made up of individuals, and 9.30% had someone living alone who was 65 years of age or older. The average household size was 2.58 and the average family size was 3.01. There is also a high population of Anabaptist communities, such as Amish and Mennonites.

The county population contained 25.5% under the age of 18, 7.4% from 18 to 24, 29.8% from 25 to 44, 25.1% from 45 to 64, and 12.3% who were 65 years of age or older. The median age was 38 years. For every 100 females, there were 98.4 males. For every 100 females age 18 and over, there were 96.9 males.

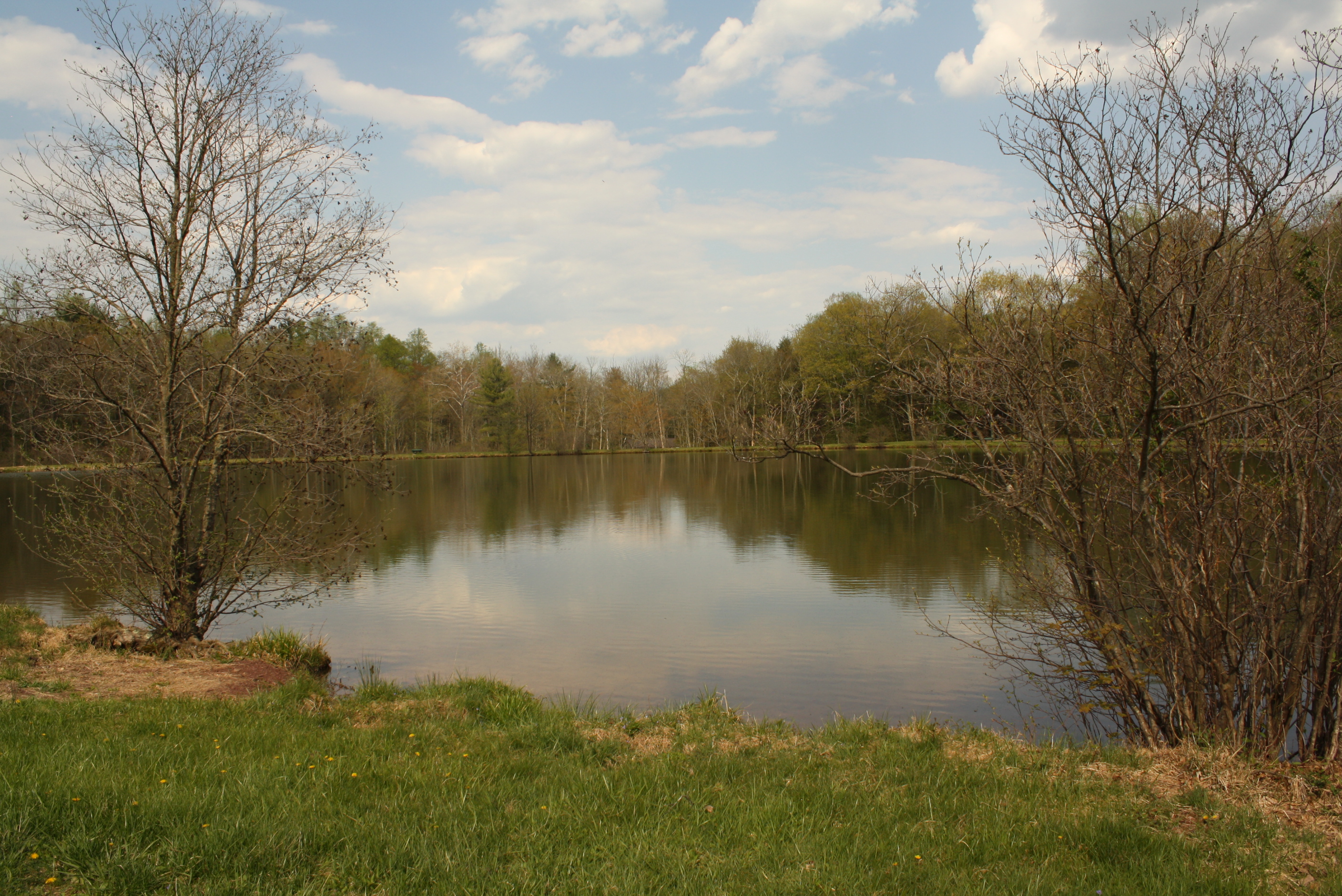
A lake in Kennedy's Valley, Perry County PA

== Metropolitan Statistical Area ==
The United States Office of Management and Budget has designated Perry County as the Harrisburg-Carlisle, PA Metropolitan Statistical Area (MSA). As of the 2010 census the metropolitan area ranked 6th most populous in the State of Pennsylvania and the 96th most populous in the United States, with its population of 549,475. Perry County is also a part of the larger Harrisburg–York–Lebanon combined statistical area (CSA), which combines the populations of Perry County as well as Adams, Cumberland, Dauphin, Lebanon and York Counties in Pennsylvania. The Combined Statistical Area ranked 5th in the State of Pennsylvania and 43rd most populous in the United States with a population of 1,219,422.

== County government ==
=== Commissioners ===
- R. Frank Campbell, Chair (R)
- Brenda L. Watson, Vice Chair (D)
- William "Bill" Lyons, Secretary (R)

(as of January 2024)

=== Sheriff ===
- David Hammar, Republican

=== State Senate ===
- Greg Rothman, Republican, Pennsylvania's 34th Senate District

=== State House of Representatives ===
- Perry A. Stambaugh, Republican, Pennsylvania's 86th Representative District

=== United States House of Representatives ===
- John Joyce, Republican, Pennsylvania's 13th congressional district

=== United States Senate ===
- John Fetterman, Democrat
- Dave McCormick, Republican

== Emergency services ==
The county's emergency services are located in the basement of the Perry County Courthouse. The 911 center's coverage area includes almost all of Perry County and portions of Juniata and Dauphin counties.

== Politics ==
In 2016, Donald J. Trump received 73.07% of the presidential vote, compared to 21.67% to Hillary Clinton, and 5.26% for candidates Gary Johnson, write-ins, Jill Stein, and Darrell L. Castle, respectively. The county has voted for the Republican in every presidential election since 1964. In 2006, Lynn Swann received 9,998 votes (69%) to 4,477 votes (31%) for Ed Rendell, making it Swann's strongest county in his defeat. Rick Santorum also received more than 60% of the Perry County vote in his defeat.

United States presidential election results for Perry County, Pennsylvania
Year	Republican		Democratic		Third party(ies)	
Year	No.	%	No.	%	No.	%
1888	3,168	53.04%	2,738	45.84%	67	1.12%
1892	3,120	52.20%	2,705	45.26%	152	2.54%
1896	3,537	57.23%	2,477	40.08%	166	2.69%
1900	3,400	57.41%	2,440	41.20%	82	1.38%
1904	3,433	60.72%	2,094	37.04%	127	2.25%
1908	3,269	58.82%	2,184	39.29%	105	1.89%
1912	1,140	23.48%	1,941	39.98%	1,774	36.54%
1916	2,575	51.46%	2,348	46.92%	81	1.62%
1920	3,787	60.64%	2,314	37.05%	144	2.31%
1924	4,185	57.52%	2,710	37.25%	381	5.24%
1928	6,469	77.66%	1,807	21.69%	54	0.65%
1932	4,402	53.23%	3,733	45.14%	134	1.62%
1936	5,759	49.65%	5,780	49.83%	61	0.53%
1940	5,877	56.02%	4,601	43.86%	12	0.11%
1944	5,722	63.37%	3,265	36.16%	43	0.48%
1948	5,444	67.71%	2,596	32.29%	0	0.00%
1952	6,733	68.76%	3,042	31.07%	17	0.17%
1956	7,511	67.59%	3,576	32.18%	25	0.22%
1960	8,134	70.30%	3,413	29.50%	23	0.20%
1964	5,364	46.84%	6,054	52.86%	34	0.30%
1968	6,655	61.34%	2,944	27.14%	1,250	11.52%
1972	8,082	73.31%	2,731	24.77%	212	1.92%
1976	7,454	60.50%	4,605	37.38%	261	2.12%
1980	8,026	63.70%	3,681	29.22%	892	7.08%
1984	9,365	71.42%	3,692	28.16%	56	0.43%
1988	8,545	68.18%	3,910	31.20%	78	0.62%
1992	7,871	51.35%	4,086	26.66%	3,370	21.99%
1996	8,156	56.19%	4,611	31.77%	1,748	12.04%
2000	11,184	69.56%	4,459	27.73%	436	2.71%
2004	13,919	71.65%	5,423	27.91%	85	0.44%
2008	13,058	65.79%	6,396	32.22%	394	1.99%
2012	13,120	68.28%	5,685	29.59%	410	2.13%
2016	15,616	73.07%	4,632	21.67%	1,123	5.25%
2020	18,293	73.98%	5,950	24.06%	485	1.96%
2024	19,073	73.87%	6,385	24.73%	361	1.40%

United States Senate election results for Perry County, Pennsylvania1
Year	Republican		Democratic		Third party(ies)	
Year	No.	%	No.	%	No.	%
1994	7,347	60.96%	3,854	31.98%	851	7.06%
2000	11,118	70.45%	4,124	26.13%	539	3.42%
2006	8,729	60.42%	5,719	39.58%	0	0.00%
2012	12,420	65.05%	6,168	32.31%	504	2.64%
2018	11,607	67.57%	5,186	30.19%	385	2.24%
2024	18,355	71.48%	6,470	25.19%	855	3.33%

United States Senate election results for Perry County, Pennsylvania3
Year	Republican		Democratic		Third party(ies)	
Year	No.	%	No.	%	No.	%
1992	9,044	59.59%	4,747	31.28%	1,387	9.14%
1998	7,374	72.81%	2,360	23.30%	394	3.89%
2004	13,083	68.47%	4,062	21.26%	1,962	10.27%
2010	10,972	75.47%	3,566	24.53%	0	0.00%
2016	14,898	70.64%	4,962	23.53%	1,231	5.84%
2022	13,956	68.98%	5,646	27.91%	629	3.11%

Pennsylvania Gubernatorial election results for Perry County
Year	Republican		Democratic		Third party(ies)	
Year	No.	%	No.	%	No.	%
1970	5,038	53.95%	3,897	41.73%	403	4.32%
1974	5,008	52.22%	4,521	47.14%	61	0.64%
1978	7,120	68.64%	3,200	30.85%	53	0.51%
1982	5,942	54.07%	4,978	45.30%	69	0.63%
1986	6,005	60.35%	3,819	38.38%	126	1.27%
1990	3,242	34.32%	6,205	65.68%	0	0.00%
1994	5,522	44.82%	3,094	25.11%	3,704	30.06%
1998	7,023	68.83%	1,487	14.57%	1,693	16.59%
2002	9,286	71.22%	3,426	26.28%	326	2.50%
2006	9,998	69.07%	4,477	30.93%	0	0.00%
2010	11,568	79.30%	3,019	20.70%	0	0.00%
2014	8,679	66.64%	4,344	33.36%	0	0.00%
2018	10,915	63.47%	5,905	34.34%	376	2.19%
2022	12,928	63.87%	6,912	34.15%	400	1.98%

== Education ==
=== Public School Districts ===
- Greenwood School District (also covers parts of Juniata County).
- Newport School District
- Susquenita School District (also covers parts of Dauphin County).
- West Perry School District
- Fannett-Metal School District (located in Franklin County, but covers parts of Perry County).

=== Intermediate unit ===
The Capital Area Intermediate Unit 15 is a state approved education agency that offers to Perry County school districts, charter schools, private schools, and home school students, a variety of services including: a completely developed K-12 curriculum that is mapped and aligned with the Pennsylvania Academic Standards (available online), shared services, a joint purchasing program and a wide variety of special education and special needs services.

=== Private schools ===
As reported on EdNA (ED Names and Addresses) by the Pennsylvania Department of Education:

- Blue Goose Children's Learning Center, Inc – Newport
- Carson Long Military Institute
- Clarks Run Parochial School – Blain
- Community Christian Academy – Newport
- Farm Lane School – Ickesburg
- Fowlers Hollow School – Blain
- Heritage Christian School – West Perry
- Honeysuckle Ridge School – Elliotsburg
- Kuddly Bear Child Care Center Inc. – Duncannon
- Loysville Youth Development Center – Loysville
- Manassa School – Blain
- Messiah Day Care Center – Elliottsburg
- Mountain View Parochial School – Ickesburg
- Perry View Parochial School – Landisburg
- Raccoon Valley Amish School – Millerstown
- Shermans View School – Loysville
- Stony Point School – Loysville
- Sunset Valley School – Millerstown

=== Trade schools ===
- Central Pennsylvania Diesel Institute – Liverpool

=== Public libraries ===
- New Bloomfield Public Library
- Community Library of Western Perry County
- Marysville-Rye Public Library
- Newport Public Library

== Media ==
=== Newspapers ===
The county is home to four weekly newspapers, three published by Advance Publications of Perry and Juniata Counties, Inc. associated with The Patriot-News of Harrisburg: Duncannon Record, The News-Sun, and Perry County Times. The Perry County Weekly is published by The Sentinel in Carlisle, Cumberland County, by Lee Enterprises of Davenport, Iowa.

=== Books ===
There are numerous historical books written about the county, available at the Council of the Arts in Newport as well as other establishments. They cover various topics of the county's past, including an historical overview of the Blain area; an account of the life of the early settlers along the Shermans Creek in three townships; and an account of a Civil War battle on Sterrett's Gap. Author and New Bloomfield resident Roy F. Chandler wrote many books about the county.

== Communities ==
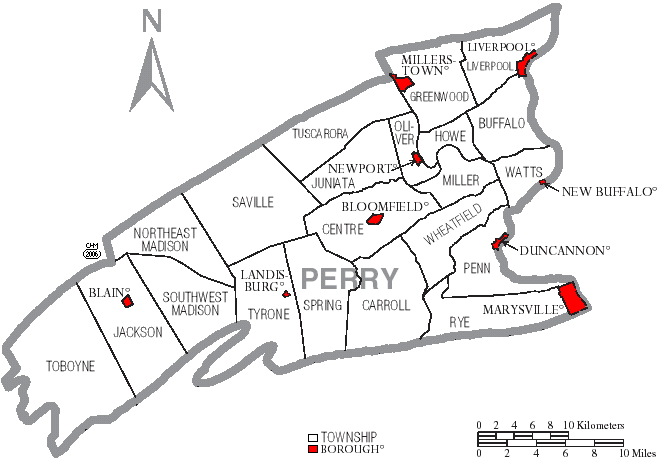
Map of Perry County, with Boroughs (red) and Townships (white)

Under Pennsylvania law, there are four types of incorporated municipalities: cities, boroughs, townships, and, in at most two cases, towns. The following boroughs and townships are located in Perry County:

=== Boroughs ===
- Blain
- Duncannon
- Landisburg
- Liverpool
- Marysville
- Millerstown
- New Bloomfield (county seat)
- New Buffalo
- Newport

=== Unincorporated communities ===
- Acker
- Andersonburg
- Alinda
- Amity Hall
- Aqueduct
- Bailey
- Bixler
- Bridgeport
- Centerville
- Center Square
- Centre
- Cisna Run
- Couchtown
- Cove
- Crums Corners
- Dellville
- Donnally Mills
- Dromgold
- Elliottsburg
- Erly
- Eshcol
- Everhartville
- Falling Spring
- Fort Robinson (See Fort Robinson)
- Glenvale
- Gramere
- Green Park
- Half Falls
- Ickesburg
- Juniata Furnace
- Keystone
- Kinkora Heights
- Kistler
- Little Germany
- Losh Run
- Loysville
- Mannsville
- Marklesville
- McKee
- Mecks Corner
- Milltown
- Montebello
- Montgomery Ferry
- Mount Patrick
- Mount Pleasant
- Nekoda
- New Germantown
- Oakgrove
- Old Ferry
- Perdix
- Pine Grove
- Pfoutz Valley
- Reward
- Rose Glen
- Roseburg
- Saville
- Seyoc
- Shermans Dale
- Stony Point
- Sundy Place
- Wahneta
- Walnut Grove
- Wardville
- Wila

=== Townships ===
- Buffalo
- Carroll
- Centre
- Greenwood
- Howe
- Jackson
- Juniata
- Liverpool
- Miller
- Northeast Madison
- Oliver
- Penn
- Rye
- Saville
- Southwest Madison
- Spring
- Toboyne
- Tuscarora
- Tyrone
- Watts
- Wheatfield

=== Population ranking ===
The population ranking of the following table is based on the 2010 census of Perry County.

† county seat

Rank	City/Town/etc.	Municipal type	Population (2010 Census)
1	Marysville	Borough	2,534
2	Newport	Borough	1,574
3	Duncannon	Borough	1,522
4	† New Bloomfield	Borough	1,247
5	Liverpool	Borough	955
6	Millerstown	Borough	673
7	Blain	Borough	263
8	Landisburg	Borough	218
9	New Buffalo	Borough	129

== Economy ==
A barn near Duncannon

Perry County's economy is primarily agricultural. Various farmers markets, roadside stands, farm produce stands, food festivals, resale farm stands, meat stores, and plant nurseries are present throughout the county. Two farms in Perry County are particularly well known, which are Spiral Path Farm and Yeehaw Farm, with the latter having been spotlighted by the Washington Post. The county's area is 38.3% farmland, of which 11.09% (thus 4.24% of all land in the county) is pastureland.

Perry County also hosts a wide range of non-agricultural businesses. Historically, mills were prevalent, and the county currently has 21 known non-operational mills still standing. Settlement was not allowed until 1755, and when settlement was allowed, it was not safe: in June 1755, Native Americans chased nearly all of the pioneers out, until it was considered safe to return in 1762. The first mill was taxed in 1763, though the exact date of its completion is not known.

Nearly every stream's basin hosted a sawmill, providing wood for early buildings and boardwalks.

== Recreation ==
The county has a variety of recreation facilities. There are three state parks: Fowlers Hollow State Park, Little Buffalo State Park, and Big Spring State Forest Picnic Area. The Hoverter and Sholl Box Huckleberry Natural Area is found near New Bloomfield along Huckleberry Road. Carroll Township Park also offers a wide variety of athletic facilities.

Pools: Liverpool Pool (Jann Deitzler Memorial Pool), Millerstown Pool, New Bloomfield Pool, and Little Buffalo State Park Pool

Trails: Hawk Rock Trail and Iron Horse Trail

State Game Lands: #170 Dellville, #254 New Buffalo, #256-Mecks Corner and #281 Miller Township. Hunting requires licenses from the PA Game Commission.

== Gallery ==
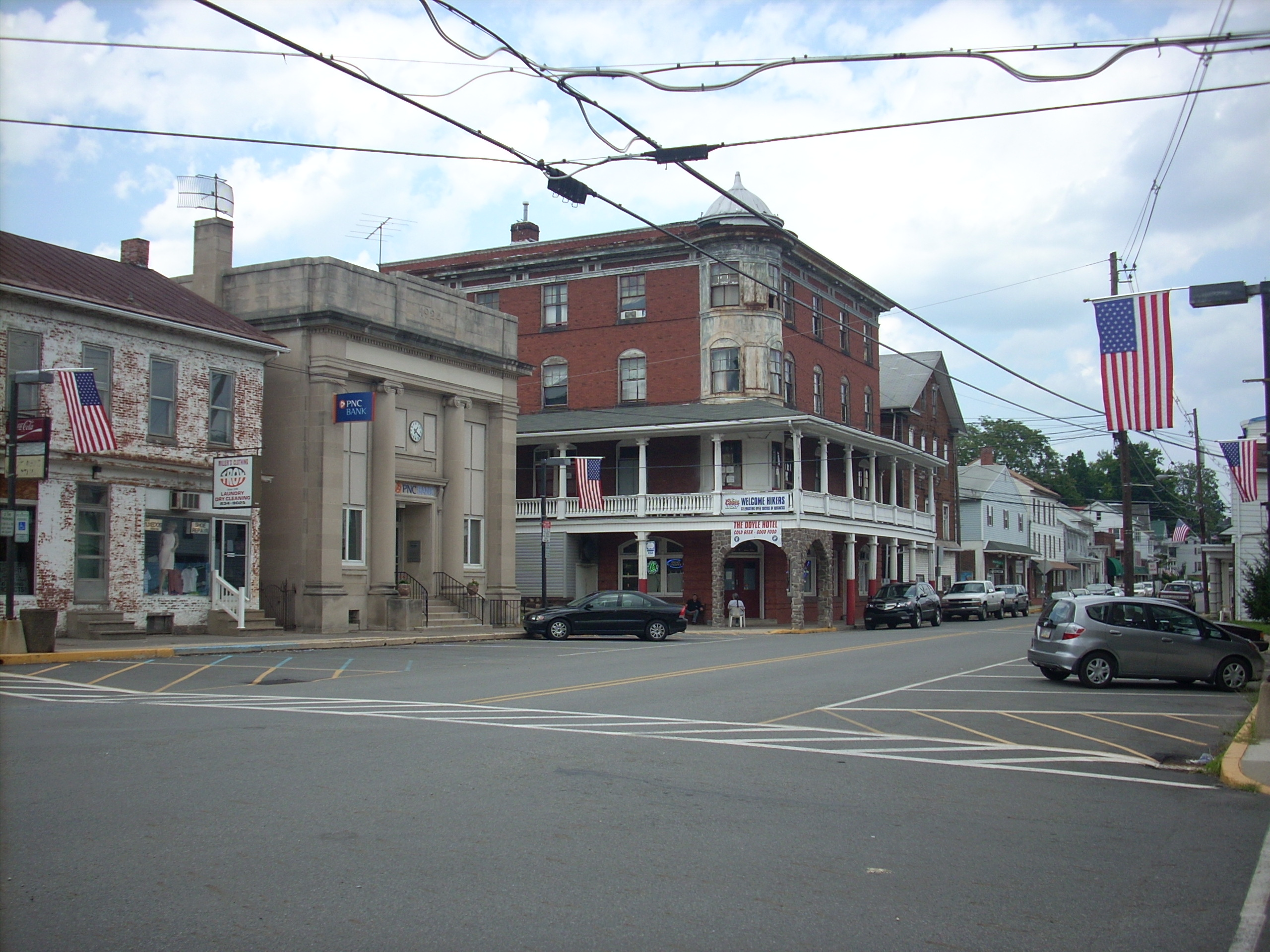
Duncannon, downtown view showing the Doyle.

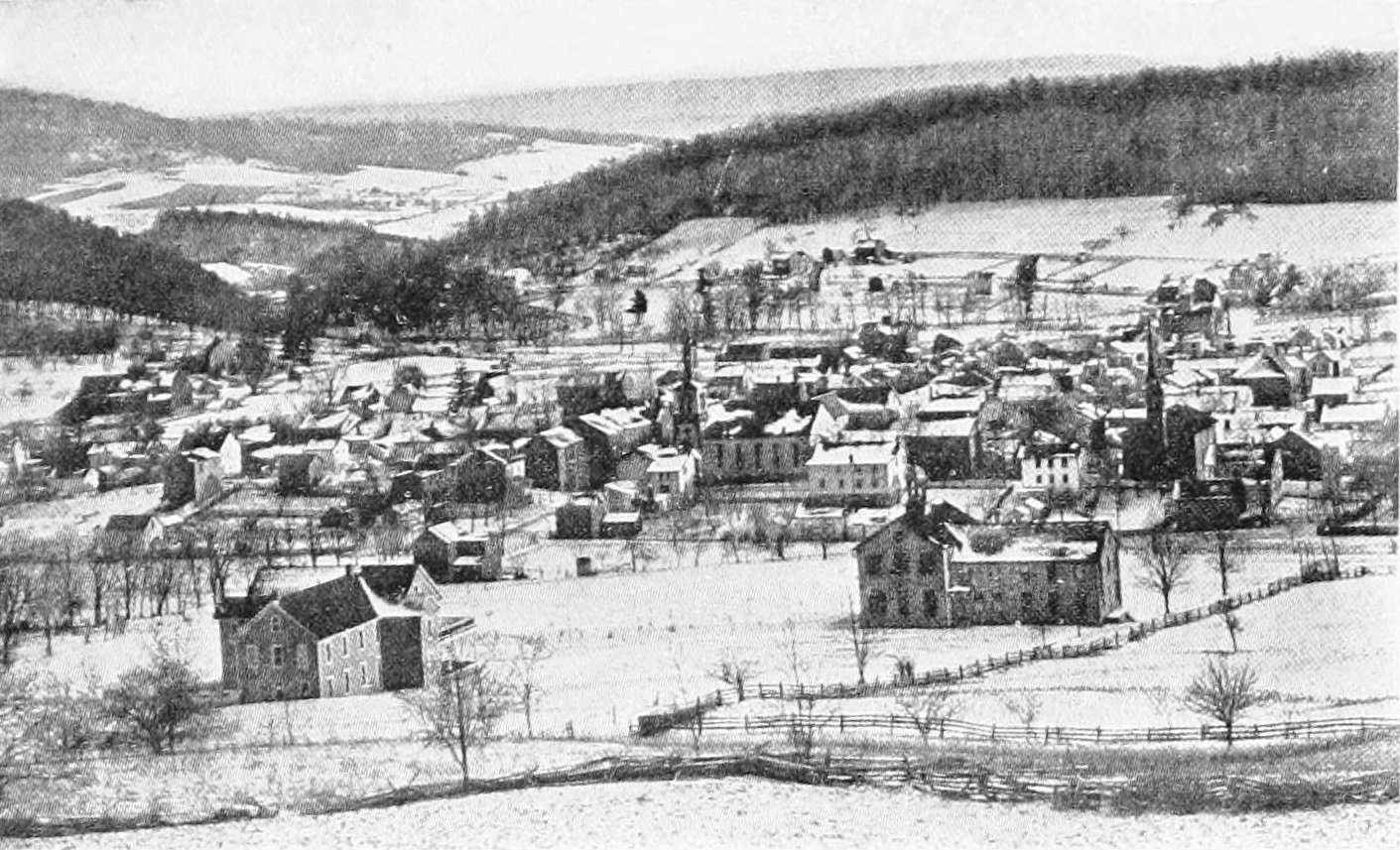
New Bloomfield in 1913.

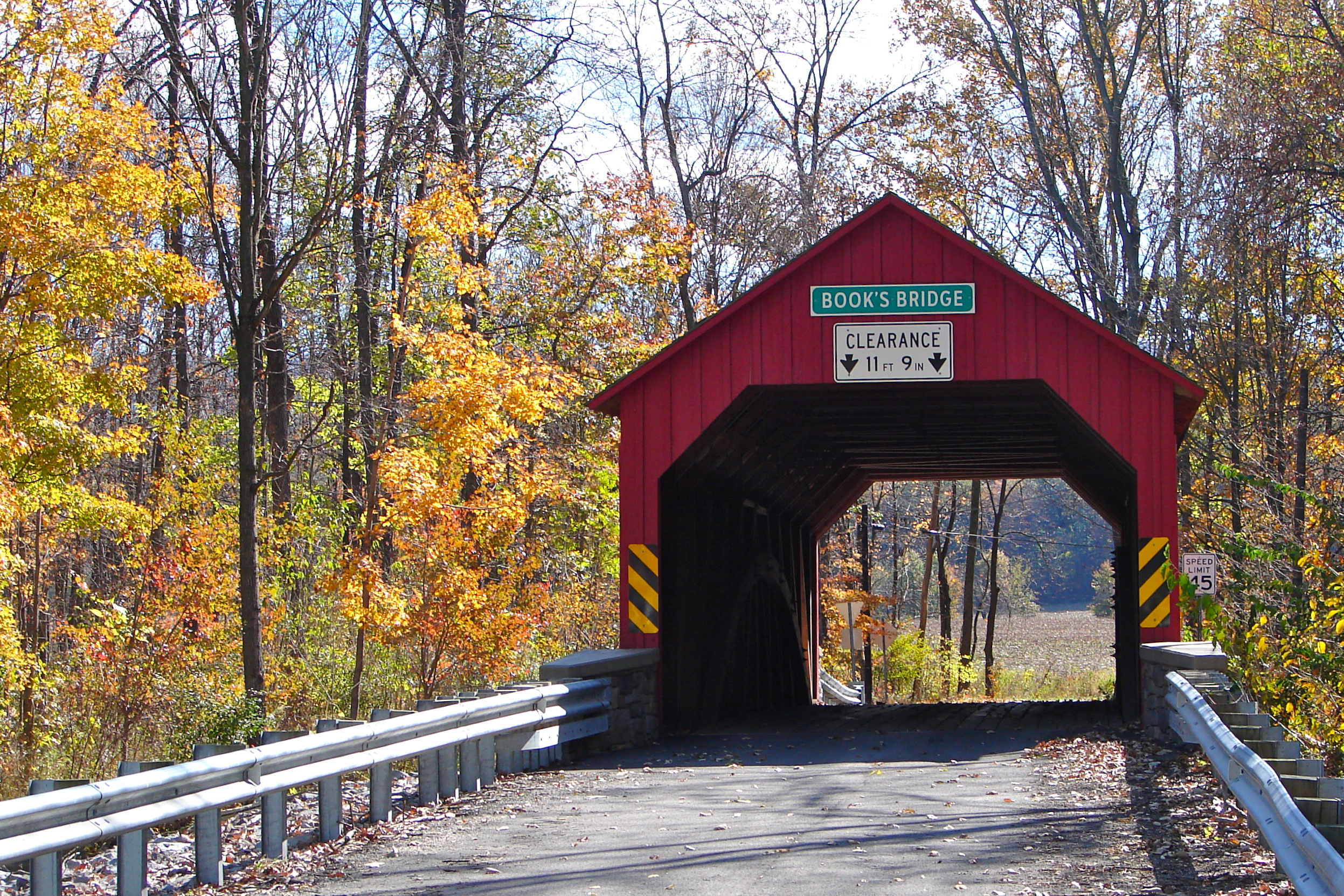
Books Covered Bridge.

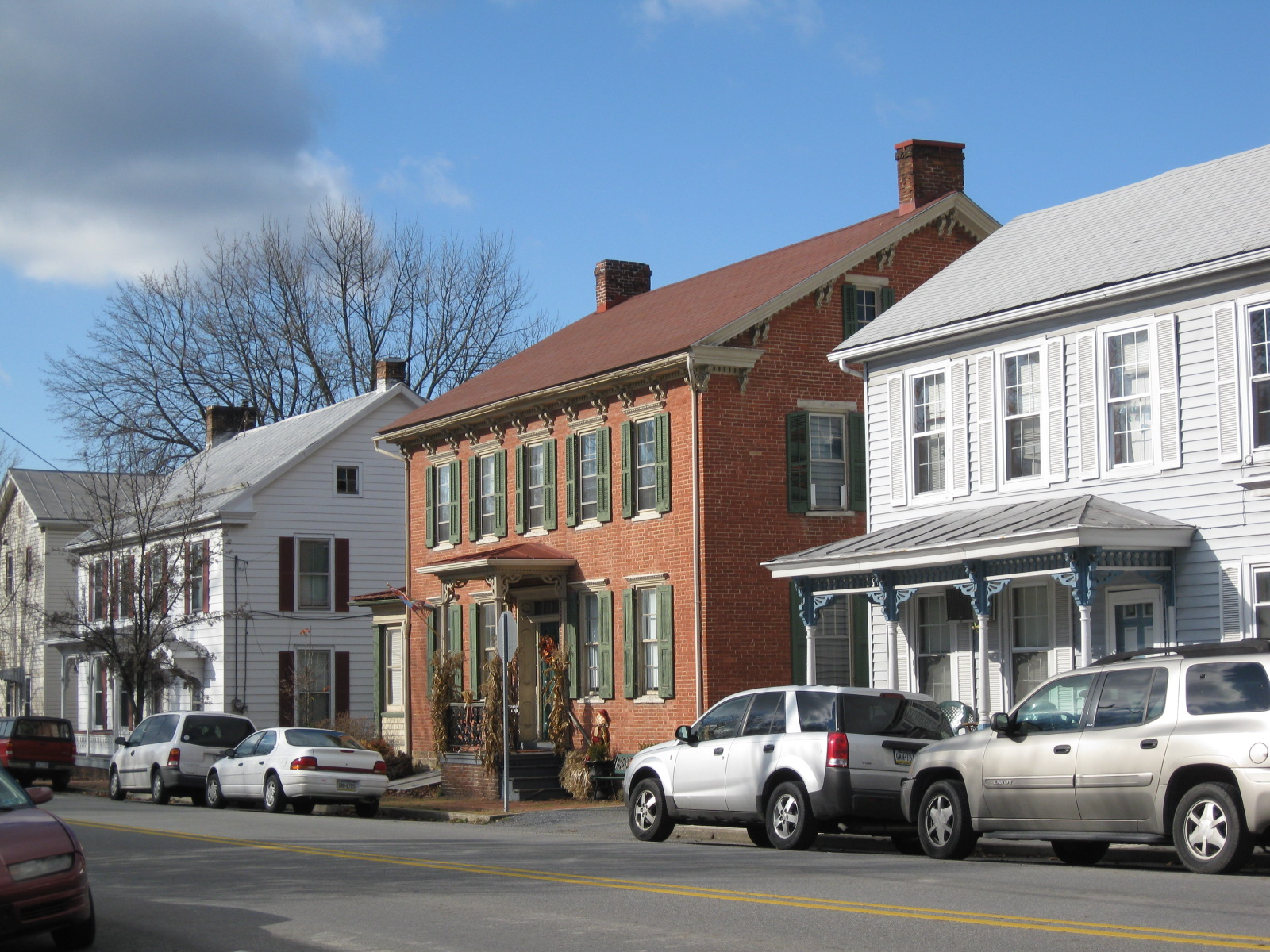
New Bloomfield.

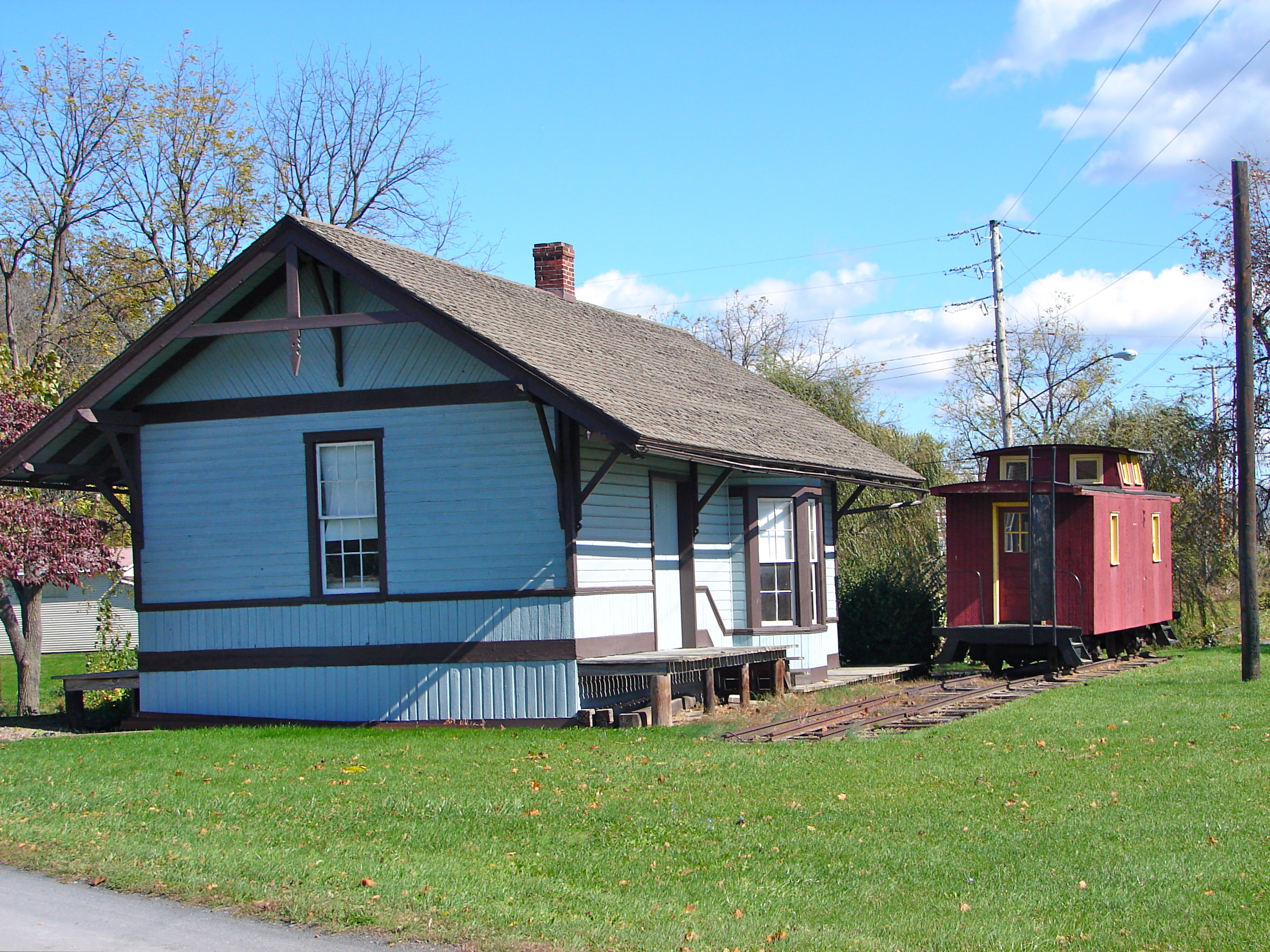
Blain Depot in Blain.

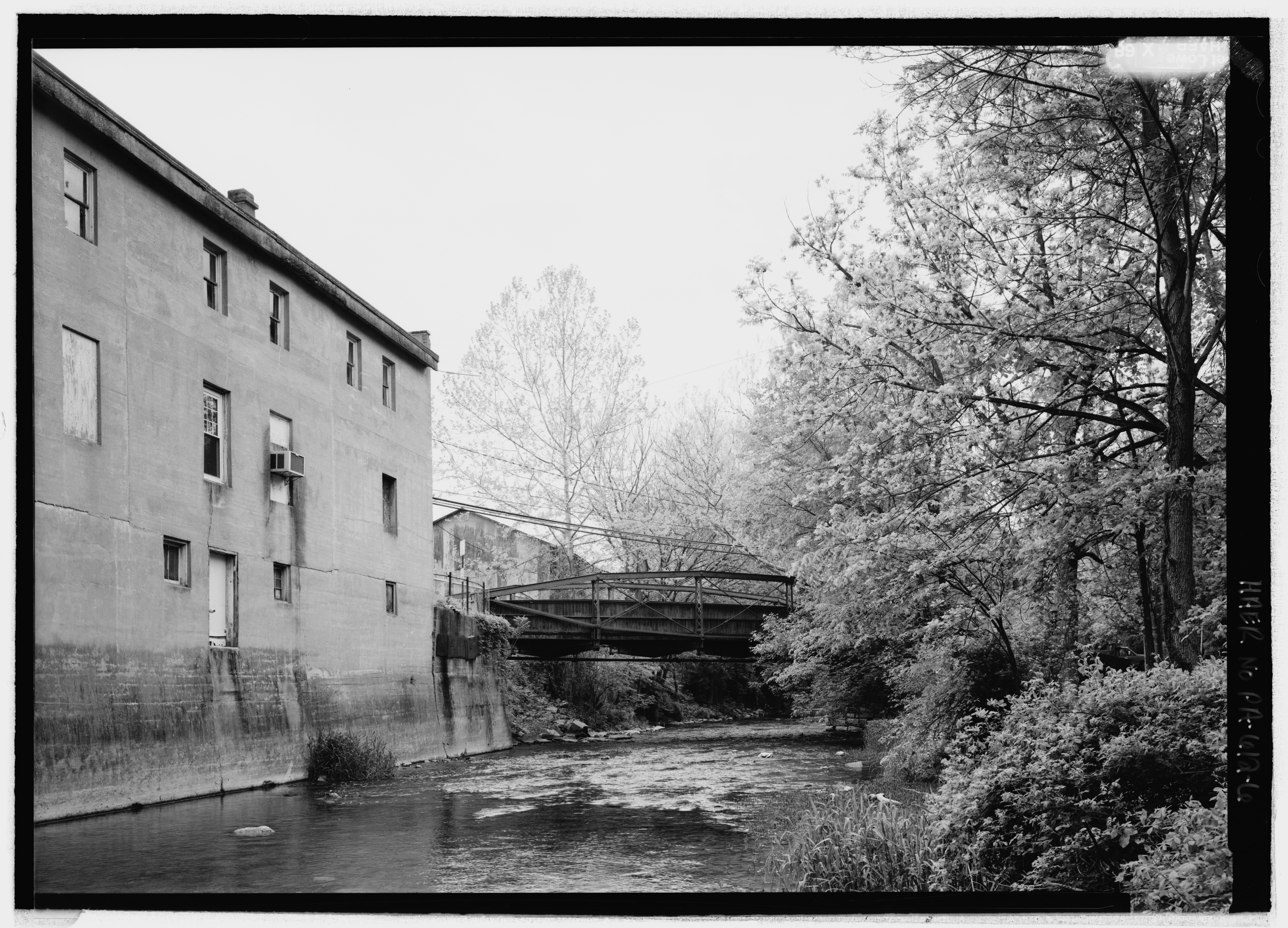
South High Street Bridge, Duncannon.

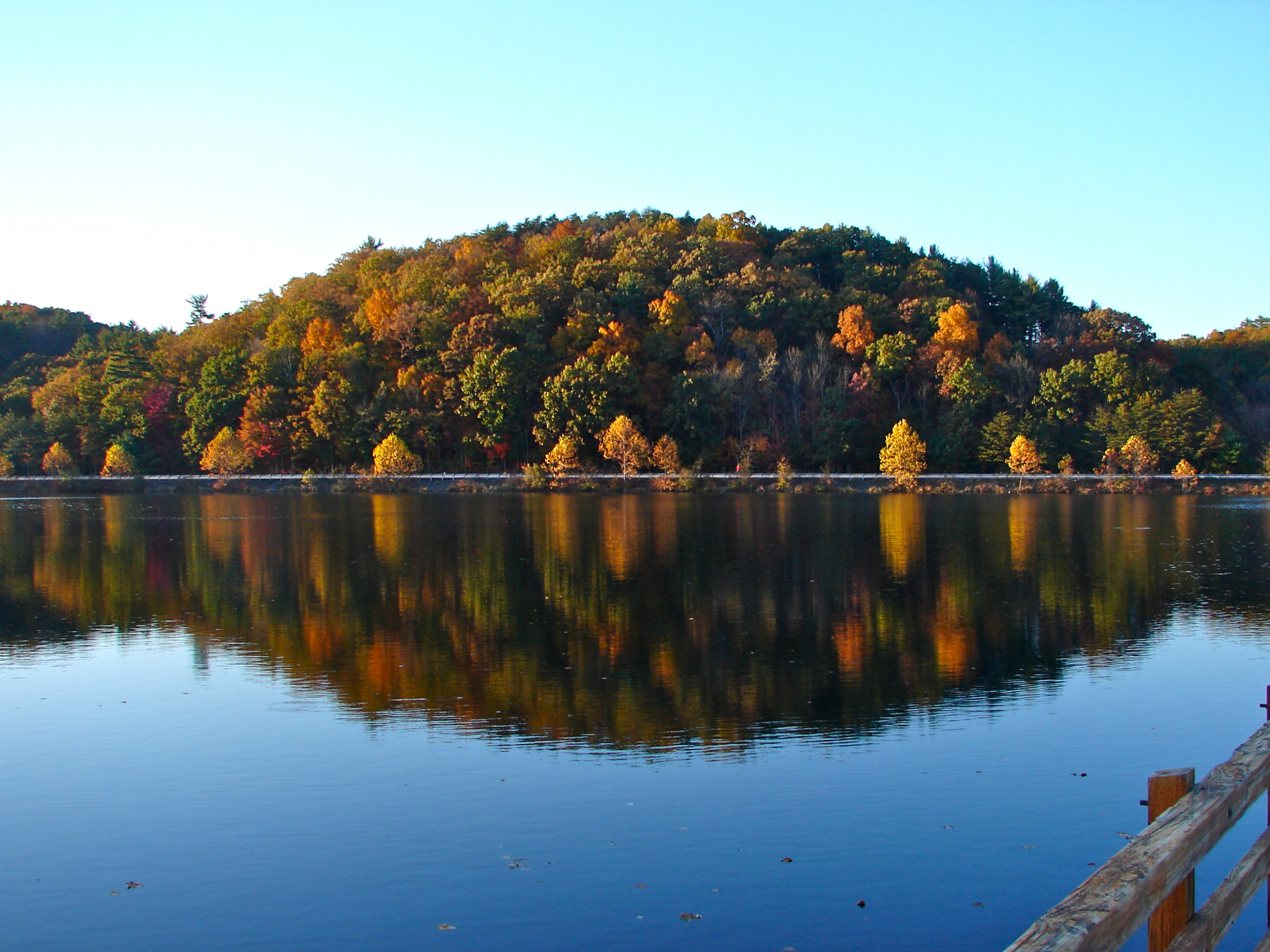
Little Buffalo State Park, near New Bloomfield.

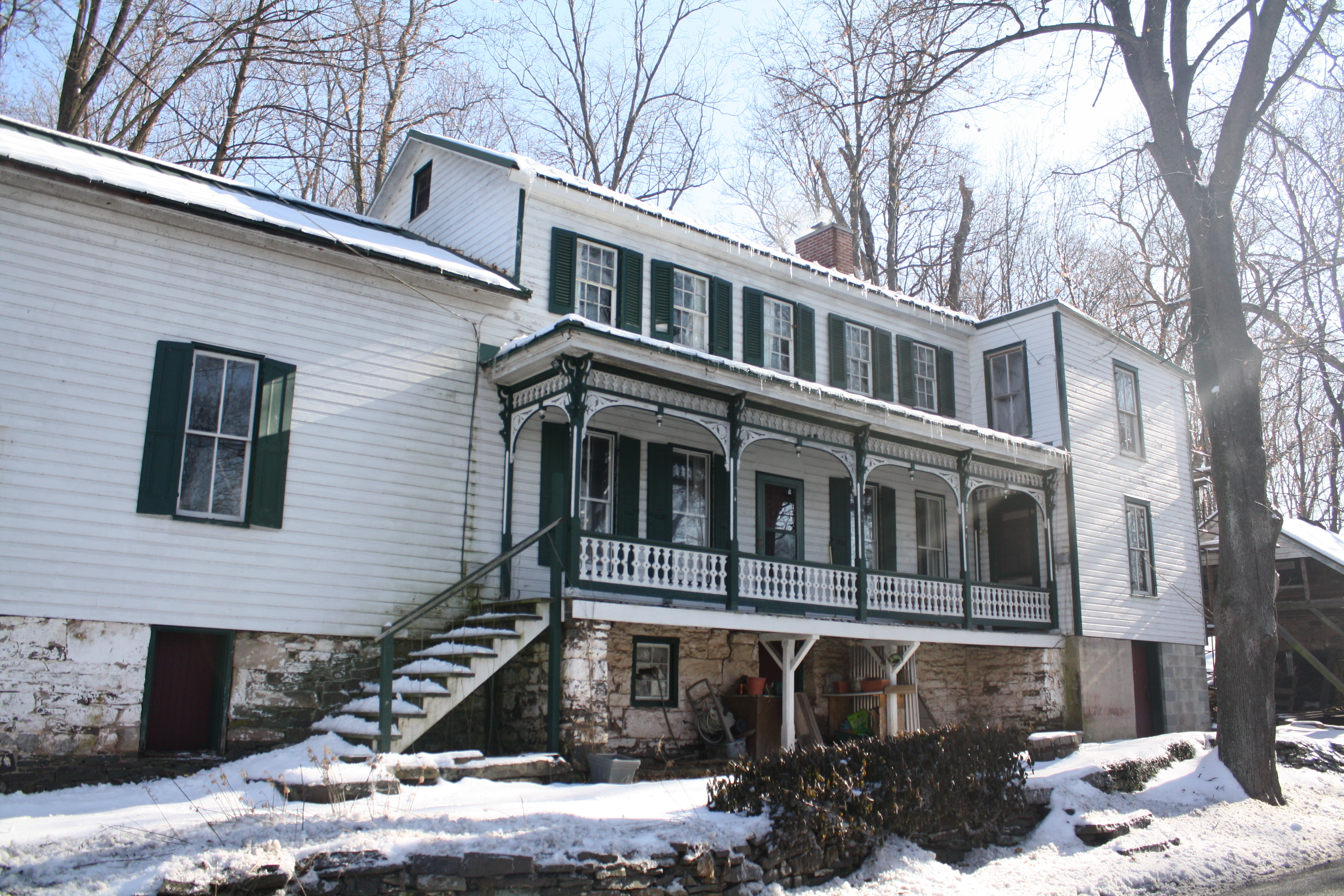
An old building in Dellville (formerly a store.)

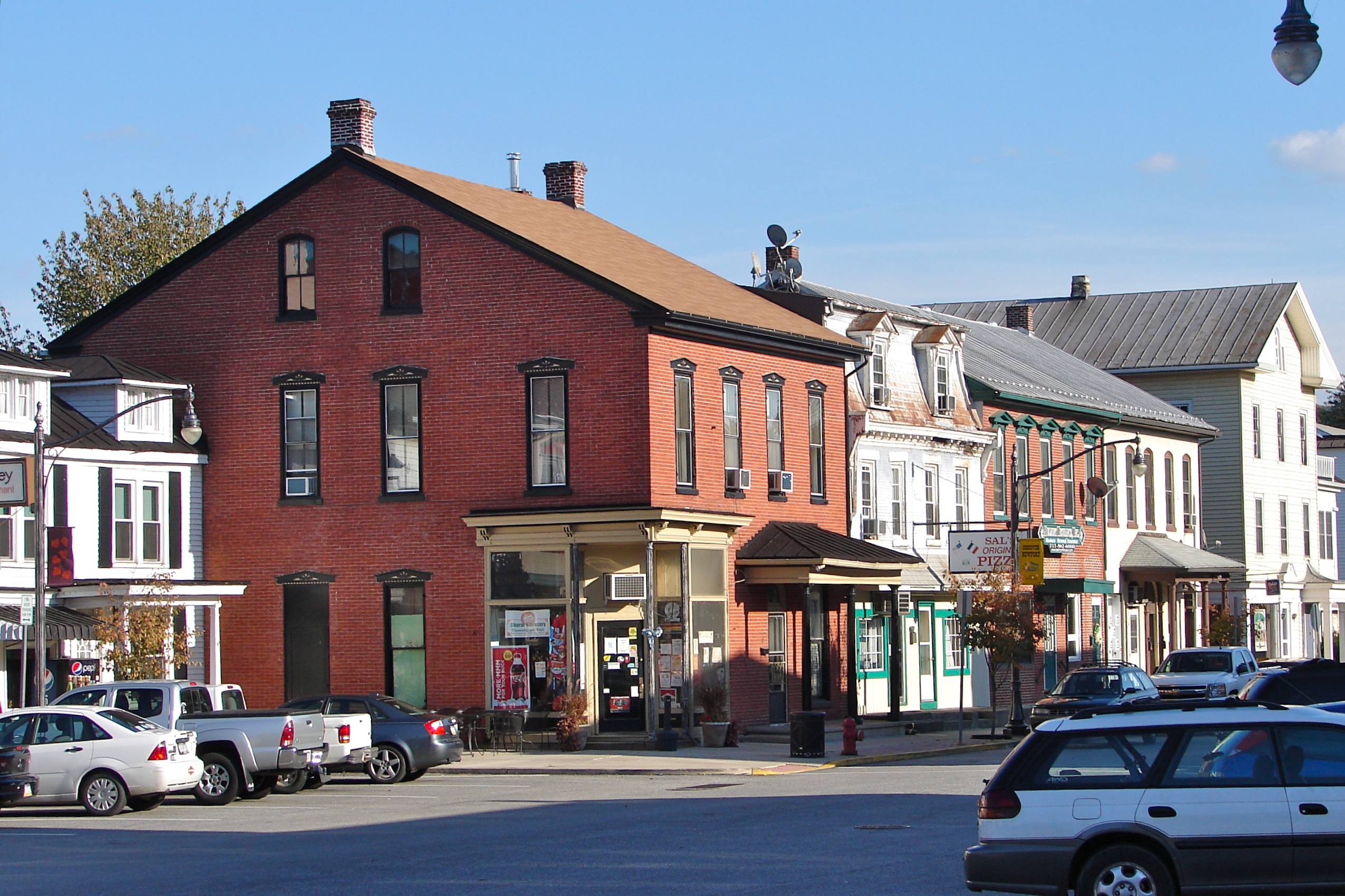
Downtown Newport.

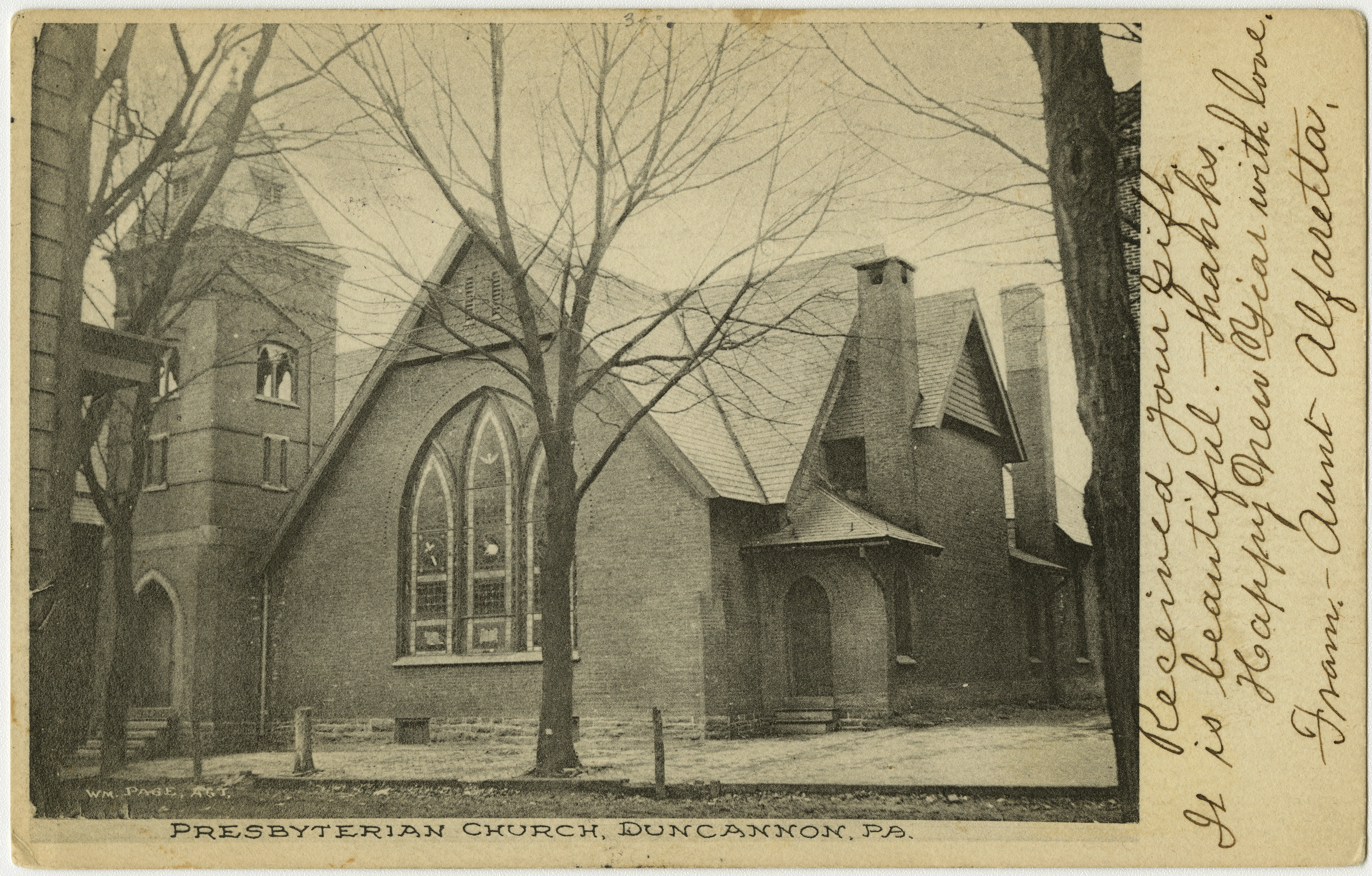
Presbyterian church in Duncannon.

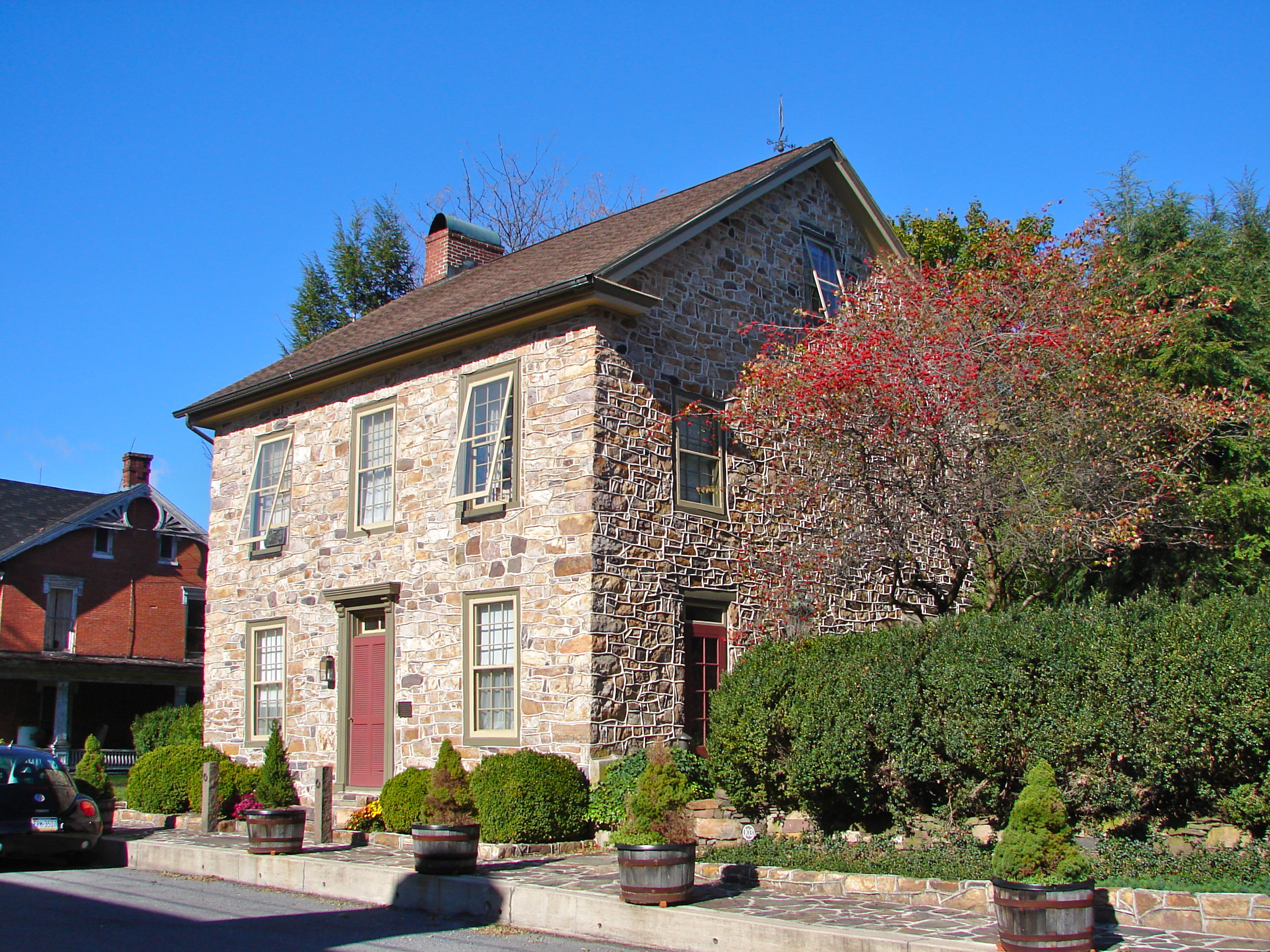
Landisburg.

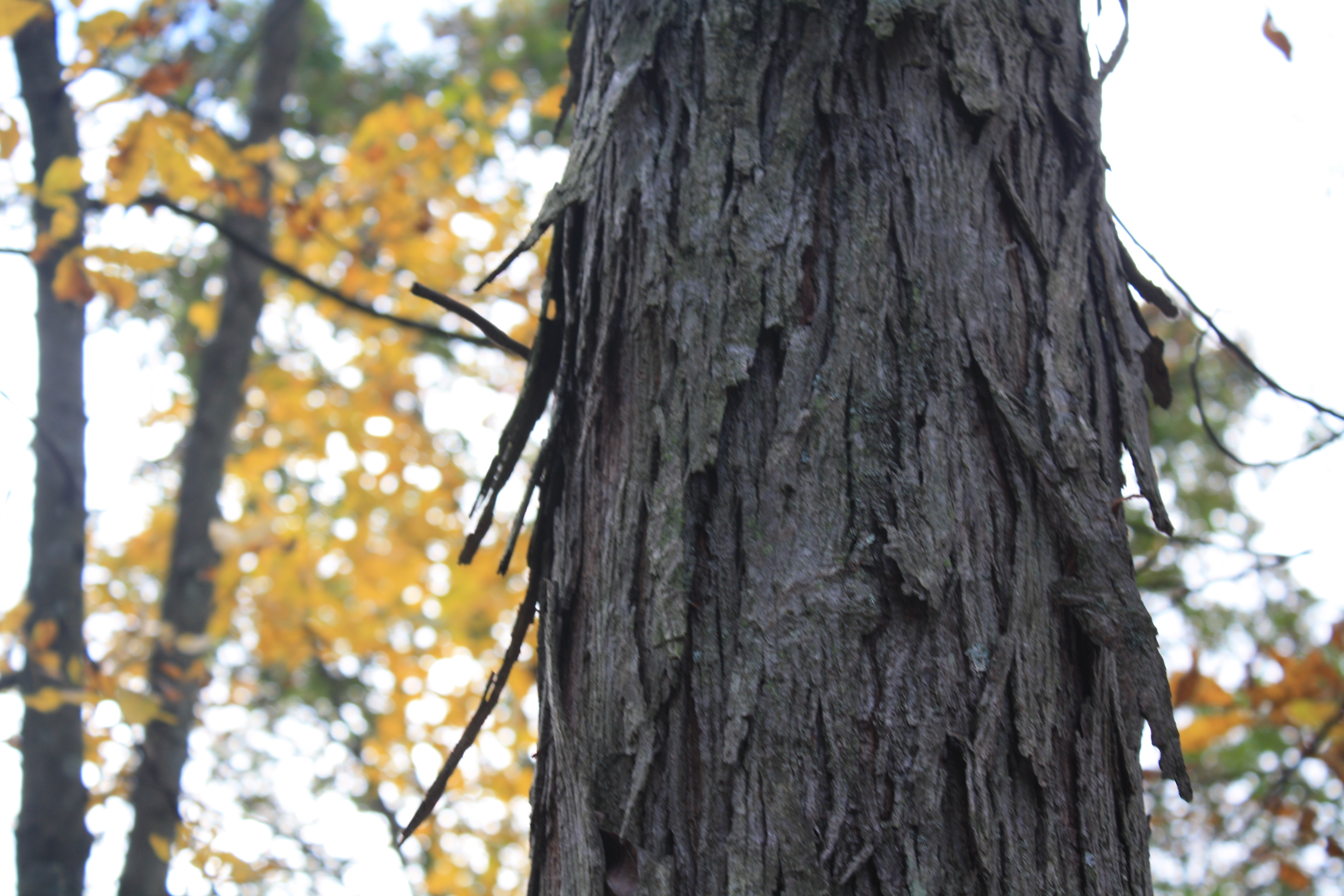
A shagbark hickory tree near Dellville.

== See also ==
- National Register of Historic Places listings in Perry County, Pennsylvania
