= Loysville, Pennsylvania =

Unincorporated community in Pennsylvania, US

- Census-designated place
- Location within Pennsylvania
- Coordinates: 40°21′56″N 77°20′40″W
- Country: United States
- State: Pennsylvania
- County: Perry
- Township: Tyrone
- Elevation: 591 ft (180 m)

Population (2019)
  - Total: 2,643
  - Density: 57/sq mi (22/km^{2})
- Time zone: UTC-5 (Eastern (EST))
  - Summer (DST): UTC-4 (EDT)
- ZIP code: 17047
- Area codes: 223 & 717
- GNIS feature ID: 1180055

Loysville is a census-designated place in Tyrone Township, Perry County, Pennsylvania, United States. The community is located at the intersection of state routes 274 and 850, 9.1 miles (14.6 km) west-southwest of New Bloomfield. Loysville has a post office, with ZIP code 17047.

== Demographics ==
Historical population
Census	Pop.	Note	%±

The United States Census Bureau defined Loysville as a census designated place (CDP) in 2023.
