= Honey Grove, Pennsylvania =

Unincorporated community in Pennsylvania, US

- Unincorporated community
- Location within Pennsylvania Location within the United States
- Coordinates: 40°24′08″N 77°33′08″W
- Country: United States
- State: Pennsylvania
- County: Juniata
- Township: Tuscarora
- Elevation: 673 ft (205 m)
- Time zone: UTC-5 (Eastern (EST))
  - Summer (DST): UTC-4 (EDT)
- ZIP code: 17035
- Area codes: 717 and 223
- GNIS feature ID: 1177344

Honey Grove is an unincorporated community in Tuscarora Township, Juniata County, Pennsylvania, United States. The community is located at the intersection of Pennsylvania routes 75 and 850, 3.5 miles (5.6 km) northeast of East Waterford. Honey Grove has a post office with ZIP code 17035, which opened on August 16, 1842.
