= New Bloomfield, Pennsylvania =

Borough in Pennsylvania, US

Bloomfield, Pennsylvania
- Borough
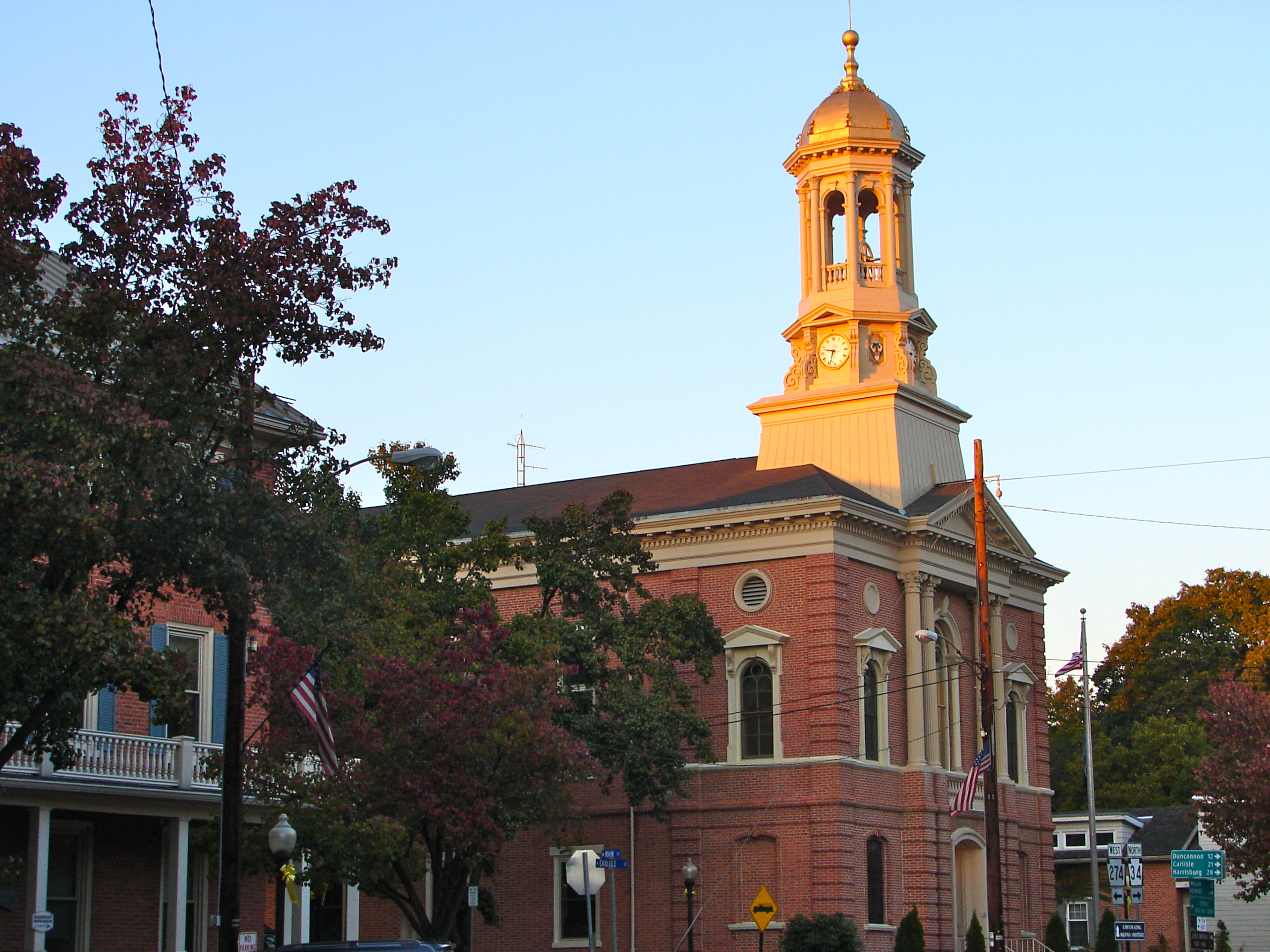
- Perry County Courthouse

- Seal

- Location of New Bloomfield in Perry County

- Location within Pennsylvania Location within the United States
- Coordinates: 40°25′06″N 77°11′18″W
- Country: United States
- State: Pennsylvania
- County: Perry
- Settled: 1824
- Incorporated: 1831

Area
  - Total: 0.61 sq mi (1.58 km^{2})
  - Land: 0.61 sq mi (1.58 km^{2})
  - Water: 0 sq mi (0.00 km^{2})
- Elevation (center of borough): 675 ft (206 m)
- Highest elevation (northern boundary): 1,000 ft (300 m)
- Lowest elevation (southeast corner by Little Juniata Creek): 640 ft (200 m)

Population (2020)
  - Total: 1,219
  - Density: 1,996.3/sq mi (770.78/km^{2})
- Time zone: UTC-5 (Eastern (EST))
  - Summer (DST): UTC-4 (EDT)
- Zip Code: 17068
- Area code: 717
- FIPS code: 42-07040
- Website: http://www.bloomfieldboro.org/

Bloomfield, commonly known as New Bloomfield, is a borough in, and the county seat of, Perry County, Pennsylvania, United States. It is part of the Harrisburg–Carlisle metropolitan statistical area. The population was 1,244 at the 2020 census.

== History ==
New Bloomfield was laid out in 1823, and named for the blooming clovers near the original town site. A post office called New Bloomfield has been in operation since 1825.

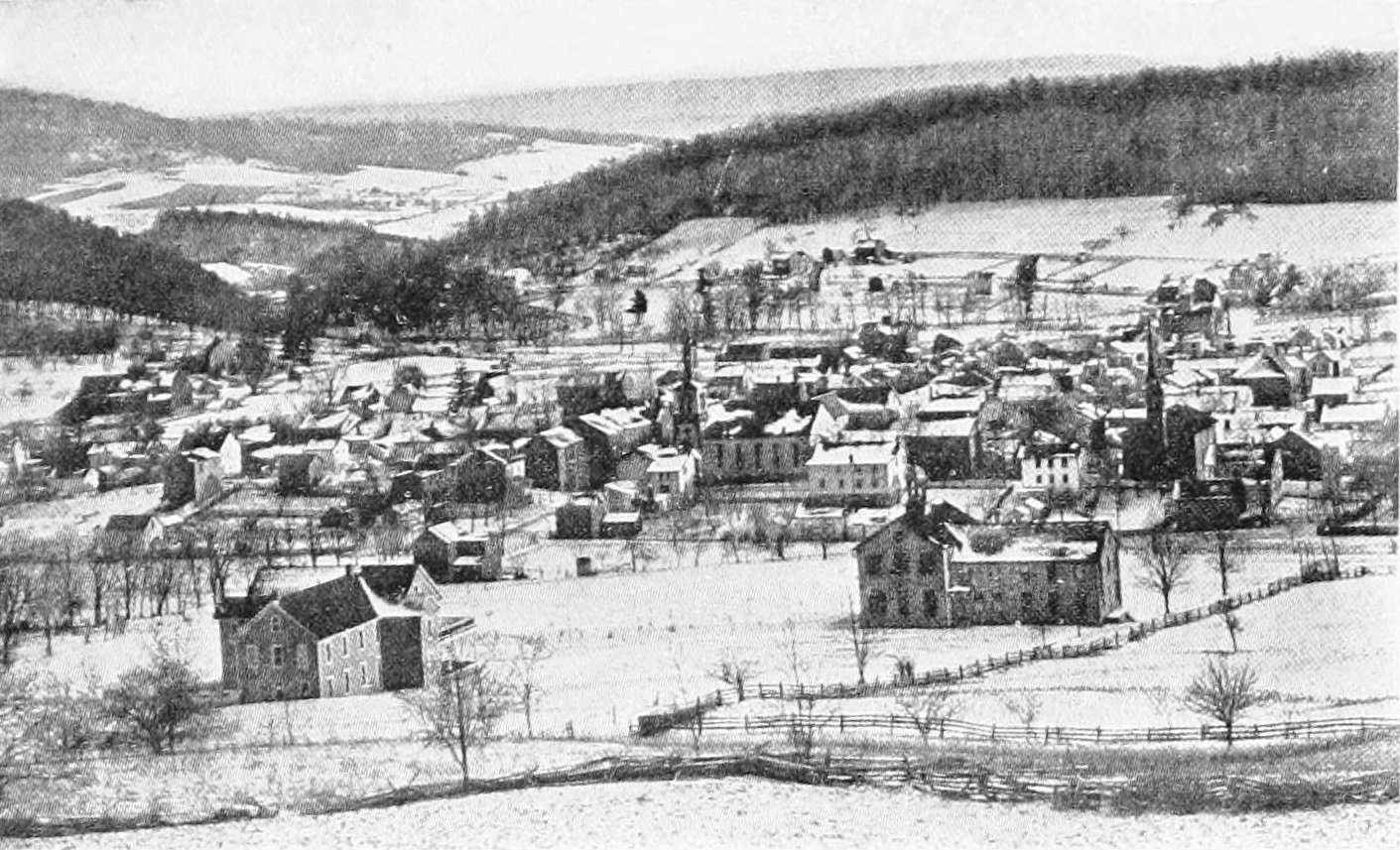
New Bloomfield, 1913

== Name ==
A post office named New Bloomfield was established in early 1825, and the federal government refers to the populated place corresponding with the borough by this name. However, the borough was incorporated as Bloomfield in 1831, which remains the current official name of the borough.

== Geography ==
According to the U.S. Census Bureau, the borough has a total area of 0.5 square miles (1.3 km^{2}), all land.

The borough is also surrounded on all sides by Centre Township.

== Demographics ==
Historical population
| Census | Pop. | Note | %± |
|---|---|---|---|
| 1840 | 412 | | — |
| 1850 | 581 | | 41.0% |
| 1860 | 661 | | 13.8% |
| 1870 | 655 | | −0.9% |
| 1880 | 673 | | 2.7% |
| 1890 | 737 | | 9.5% |
| 1900 | 772 | | 4.7% |
| 1910 | 762 | | −1.3% |
| 1920 | 778 | | 2.1% |
| 1930 | 730 | | −6.2% |
| 1940 | 858 | | 17.5% |
| 1950 | 1,098 | | 28.0% |
| 1960 | 987 | | −10.1% |
| 1970 | 1,032 | | 4.6% |
| 1980 | 1,109 | | 7.5% |
| 1990 | 1,092 | | −1.5% |
| 2000 | 1,077 | | −1.4% |
| 2010 | 1,247 | | 15.8% |
| 2020 | 1,219 | | −2.2% |
| 2021 (est.) | 1,248 | ▲ | 2.4% |

As of the census of 2000, there were 1,077 people, 396 households, and 255 families living in the borough. The population density was 1,983.1 inhabitants per square mile (765.7/km^{2}). There were 425 housing units at an average density of 782.6 per square mile (302.2/km^{2}). The racial makeup of the borough was 98.89% White, 0.56% African American, 0.28% Native American, and 0.28% from two or more races. Hispanic or Latino of any race were 0.56% of the population.

There were 396 households, out of which 29.8% had children under the age of 18 living with them, 51.0% were married couples living together, 9.6% had a female householder with no husband present, and 35.4% were non-families. 31.6% of all households were made up of individuals, and 15.2% had someone living alone who was 65 years of age or older. The average household size was 2.25 and the average family size was 2.84.

In the borough, the population was spread out, with 19.9% under the age of 18, 9.3% from 18 to 24, 24.6% from 25 to 44, 21.4% from 45 to 64, and 24.9% who were 65 years of age or older. The median age was 42 years. For every 100 females, there were 90.6 males. For every 100 females age 18 and over, there were 93.9 males.

The median income for a household in the borough was $39,018, and the median income for a family was $47,500. Males had a median income of $30,781 versus $24,286 for females. The per capita income for the borough was $17,168. About 6.0% of families and 7.6% of the population were below the poverty line, including 10.3% of those under age 18 and 6.1% of those age 65 or over.

== Arts and culture ==
The Perry County Courthouse in New Bloomfield is listed on the National Register of Historic Places.

== Notable people ==
- Reece J. Lutz, US Army brigadier general
- Musa Smith, pro football player
