= National Register of Historic Places listings in Perry County, Pennsylvania =

Location of Perry County in Pennsylvania

This is a list of the National Register of Historic Places listings in Perry County, Pennsylvania.

This is intended to be a complete list of the properties and districts on the National Register of Historic Places in Perry County, Pennsylvania, United States. The locations of National Register properties and districts for which the latitude and longitude coordinates are included below, may be seen in a map.

There are 23 properties and districts listed on the National Register in the county.

This National Park Service list is complete through NPS recent listings posted March 14, 2025.

== Current listings ==
	Name on the Register	Image	Date listed	Location	City or town	Description
1	Adairs Covered Bridge	Adairs Covered Bridge	August 25, 1980 (#80003594)	East of Andersonburg on Legislative Route 50009; 40°21′02″N 77°25′27″W	Southwest Madison Township	
2	Bistline Covered Bridge	Bistline Covered Bridge	August 25, 1980 (#80003591)	South of Andersonburg on Legislative Route 50008; 40°20′02″N 77°28′14″W	Southwest Madison Township	
3	Book's Covered Bridge	Book's Covered Bridge	August 25, 1980 (#80003592)	Southwest of Blain on Legislative Route 50004; 40°19′28″N 77°31′29″W	Jackson Township	
4	Bower Homestead Farm		August 6, 2021 (#100006784)	1790 Conococheague Rd. 40°19′47″N 77°32′20″W	Blain	
5	Bridge in Newport Borough	Bridge in Newport Borough	June 22, 1988 (#88000854)	Legislative Route 34 over Little Buffalo Creek; 40°28′27″N 77°07′48″W	Newport and Oliver Township	
6	Clark's Ferry Tavern	Clark's Ferry Tavern	February 18, 2021 (#100006148)	603 North Market Street; 40°23′47″N 77°01′30″W	Duncannon	
7	Dellville Covered Bridge	Dellville Covered Bridge	August 25, 1980 (#80003593)	Township 456; 40°21′49″N 77°07′00″W	Wheatfield Township	
8	Dunbar-Creigh House	Dunbar-Creigh House	June 27, 1980 (#80003595)	Water Street; 40°20′30″N 77°18′25″W	Landisburg	
9	Fleisher Covered Bridge	Fleisher Covered Bridge	August 25, 1980 (#80003601)	Northwest of Newport on Township 477; 40°29′22″N 77°09′31″W	Oliver Township	
10	Kochendefer Covered Bridge	Kochendefer Covered Bridge	August 25, 1980 (#80003602)	Southeast of Saville on Township 332; 40°25′27″N 77°23′15″W	Saville Township	
11	Little Buffalo Historic District	Little Buffalo Historic District	April 3, 1978 (#78002440)	Southwest of Newport off Pennsylvania Route 34; 40°27′19″N 77°10′13″W	Centre and Juniata Townships	
12	Israel and Samuel Lupfer Tannery Site and House	Israel and Samuel Lupfer Tannery Site and House	May 30, 2003 (#03000493)	Black Hollow Road; 40°16′54″N 77°32′02″W	Jackson and Toboyne Townships	
13	Millersburg Ferry	Millersburg Ferry	August 2, 2006 (#06000663)	Over the Susquehanna River between Millersburg and Buffalo Township; 40°32′39″N 76°58′25″W	Buffalo Township	Extends into Millersburg in Dauphin County
14	Mt. Pleasant Covered Bridge	Mt. Pleasant Covered Bridge	August 25, 1980 (#80003599)	East of New Germantown on Township 304; 40°18′54″N 77°32′44″W	Jackson Township	
15	New Germantown Covered Bridge	New Germantown Covered Bridge	August 25, 1980 (#80003600)	South of New Germantown on Township 302; 40°18′24″N 77°34′06″W	Jackson Township	
16	Newport Historic District	Newport Historic District	March 12, 1999 (#99000321)	Roughly bounded by Fickes Lane, Oliver Street, Front Street, Little Buffalo Run, Bloomfield Avenue, and Sixth Street; 40°28′39″N 77°07′58″W	Newport and Oliver Township	
17	O'Donel House and Farm	O'Donel House and Farm	July 17, 1986 (#86001687)	West of New Germantown on Pennsylvania Route 274; 40°16′53″N 77°37′19″W	Toboyne Township	
18	Perry County Courthouse	Perry County Courthouse	February 24, 1975 (#75001659)	Center Square; 40°25′12″N 77°11′15″W	Bloomfield	
19	Red Covered Bridge	Red Covered Bridge	August 25, 1980 (#80003597)	East of Millerstown on Legislative Route 50023; 40°33′58″N 77°00′14″W	Liverpool Township	
20	Rice Covered Bridge	Rice Covered Bridge	August 25, 1980 (#80003596)	South of Landisburg on Legislative Route 50023; 40°20′09″N 77°18′34″W	Tyrone Township	
21	Rockville Bridge	Rockville Bridge	August 15, 1975 (#75001640)	0.5 miles south of central Marysville over the Susquehanna River; 40°19′59″N 76°54′42″W	Marysville	Extends into Dauphin County
22	Saville Covered Bridge	Saville Covered Bridge	August 25, 1980 (#80003603)	Legislative Route 50037; 40°26′17″N 77°23′47″W	Saville Township	
23	Waggoner Covered Bridge	Waggoner Covered Bridge	August 25, 1980 (#80003598)	West of Loysville on Township 579; 40°21′34″N 77°22′23″W	Northeast Madison Township	

== See also ==
- List of National Historic Landmarks in Pennsylvania
- National Register of Historic Places listings in Pennsylvania
- List of Pennsylvania state historical markers in Perry County
