= Little Buffalo State Park =

State park in Pennsylvania, United States

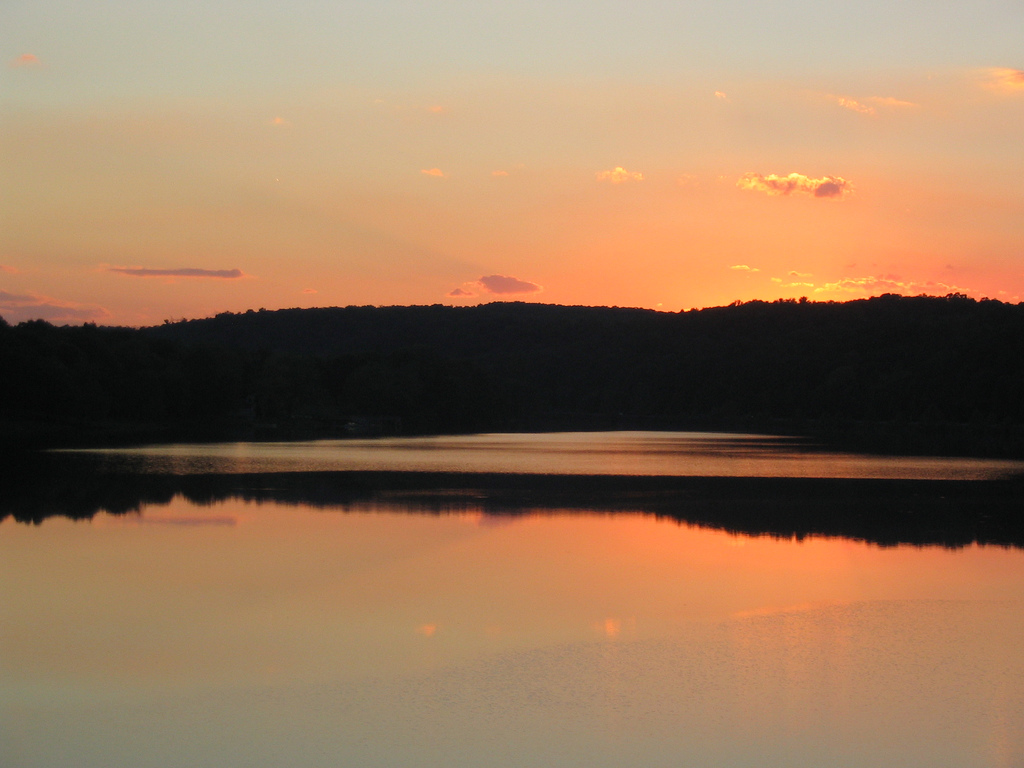

- Location within Pennsylvania Location within the United States
- Interactive map of Little Buffalo State Park
- Location: Perry County, Pennsylvania, United States
- Coordinates: 40°27′31″N 77°10′06″W
- Area: 991.13 acres (401.10 ha)
- Elevation: 643 feet (196 m)
- Established: 1972
- Administrator: Pennsylvania Department of Conservation and Natural Resources
- Website: Official website
- Pennsylvania State Parks

Little Buffalo State Park is a Pennsylvania state park on 923 acres (3.7 km^{2}) in Centre and Juniata Townships, Perry County, Pennsylvania in the United States. The park is a historical destination as well as a recreational destination. Visitors to the park can cross a covered bridge and observe a restored and operating grist mill. The park is also home to Holman Lake a popular fishing lake in Perry County and several hundred acres are open to hunting. Little Buffalo State Park is a mile southwest of Newport just off Pennsylvania Route 34.

== History ==
Little Buffalo State Park is named for Little Buffalo Creek which runs through the park. The creek and the nearby Buffalo Ridge are named for the bison that are believed to have once roamed the ridge and valley region of Pennsylvania. Humans have lived in what is now Pennsylvania since at least 10,000 BC. The first settlers were Paleo-Indian nomadic hunters known from their stone tools. The hunter-gatherers of the Archaic period, which lasted locally from 7000 to 1000 BC, used a greater variety of more sophisticated stone artifacts. The Woodland period marked the gradual transition to semi-permanent villages and horticulture, between 1000 BC and 1500 AD. Archeological evidence found in the state from this time includes a range of pottery types and styles, burial mounds, pipes, bows and arrow, and ornaments. Perry County was part of the Albany Purchase of 1754 when the colonists purchased a large tract of land from the Iroquois League of Six Nations.

Settlement of the area did not begin in force until after the American Revolution. The early settlers cleared the land for farming. Much of this land is still farmed today. John Koch, one of the first to farm the area in the 1790s, opened the Blue Ball Tavern in 1811. This tavern served travellers on the Carlisle Pike between Carlisle and Sunbury. The tavern offered food, drink, and a sleeping loft. It became a gathering spot for locals as they discussed the news and gossip of the day. The Blue Ball Tavern served as a rest stop for messengers who travelled between Carlisle and Sunbury during the War of 1812. Rumor has it that the tavern was where the plans for the creation of Perry County were made in 1821. The tavern was closed in 1841. A farmhouse was built in 1865 on the foundation of the tavern. Some recycled boards and hardware from the tavern were used in the construction of the farmhouse which currently houses the Blue Ball Tavern Museum and a library that are operated by the Perry County Historical Society. The early days of the Newport area are tied to the charcoal industry. Before the discovery of coal, charcoal was used to fire the furnaces of the iron furnaces. The demand for charcoal was great. One iron furnace could consume 1 acre (4,000 m^{2}) of forest in one day. Massive charcoal furnaces were built near Newport to meet these needs. The charcoal was created by stacking timber around large hearths. The hearths were fired by a collier. The collier tended the hearths for 10 to 14 days until the charcoal was ready. The charcoal was then sent to the Juniata Iron Works which was in operation until 1848 when all the wood in the surrounding area had been consumed. Reminders of the charcoal industry are visible today at Little Buffalo State Park. Large circular areas of mostly barren land are located at the sites of the former furnaces and pieces of charcoal can still be found in the woods of the park.

The land was not left to waste after the Juniata Iron Works was shut down in 1848. Farmers stayed on the land and it was actively farmed until the 1960s. William Shoaff bought 63 acres (250,000 m^{2}) of land and a gristmill from the Juniata Iron Works in 1849 after it had been shut down. The local farmers brought their crops to Shoaff's Mill until the 1940s. The mill has since been restored and is back in operation. Visitors to the park can observe the milling of cornmeal, cracked corn and the grinding of apples for apple cider.

Little Buffalo State Park was opened to the public in 1972. The effort to create the park was led by Allan W. Holman Jr. Holman was a member of the Pennsylvania General Assembly and represented the area. Holman Lake is named in his honor.

== Wildlife ==
Little Buffalo Creek and Holman Lake create an excellent habitat for a great variety of wild animals. The waters of the creek and lake are warm. This makes for an ideal habitat for crappie, sunfish and largemouth bass. The bass will eat just about anything in the lake. They prey on ducklings, crayfish, frogs and even other fish. Holman Lake has a very large population of yellow perch. The population of the yellow perch has been managed by the stocking of walleye, muskellunge, and channel catfish. This large population with such a tremendous variety of fish has made Holman Lake a very popular fishing lake. Holman Lake is a designated "Big Bass Lake". This means that the only fish anglers are allowed to keep must be at least 15 inches long with a daily limit of 4 bass.

The fish population draws birds to the waters of Holman Lake. Bald eagles and osprey do not nest at Little Buffalo State Park, but they do fish the waters. Great blue heron and green heron wade in the shallows of the lake in search of fish, frogs and crayfish. Wood ducks make their home at the lake along with mallards and Canada geese. The woods and field surrounding the lake are the home of the once rare bluebird. These birds became endangered due to the loss habitat. They nested only in tree cavities. People have helped the bluebird by constructing birdhouses that mimic the woodpecker holes that bluebirds would naturally use to build their nests. Turkeys and ruffed grouse live in and thrive in the forests of Little Buffalo State Park.

The streams and lakeshores of Little Buffalo State Park are the home to the nocturnal hunter the mink. The park is also a habitat for woodland mammals such as the white-tailed deer, red and gray squirrel, rabbits, chipmunks, and black bear.

Little Buffalo State Park has a population of snakes and turtles. The red spotted newt lives near the lake. This amphibian is often confused with a lizard. It is five inches (127 mm) long and is green with red spots. These newts are numerous because they are not eaten by the many fish of the lake. The skin of the newt secretes a mild toxin that makes it unpalatable to fish.

== Recreation ==
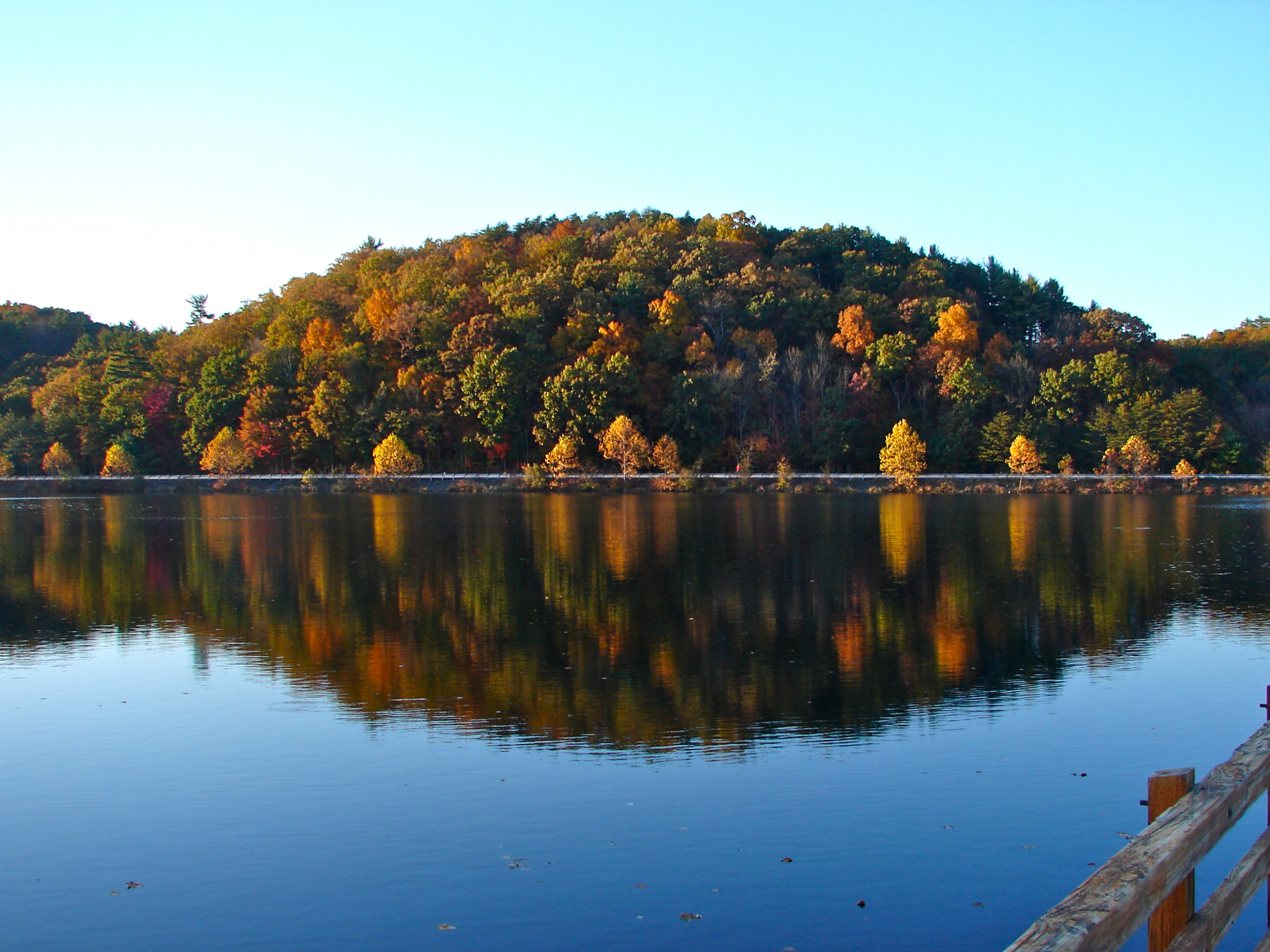
Holman Lake in the fall

Little Buffalo State Park offers many recreational opportunities for visitors to the park.

=== Picnics ===
There are two picnic areas at Little Buffalo State Park. Both areas have a view of Lake Holman and are largely shaded by oak, maple and ash trees. The Main Picnic Area is close to the swimming pool. It shares a first-aid station, shower area, and food concession with the pool. The picnic area is also the location of a playground, horseshoe pits, two pavilions, restrooms, picnic tables and grills and a boat rental station. The East Picnic Area is near the historical covered bridge and farmhouse. It has restrooms, picnic tables and grills, a horseshoe pit, a pavilion, an environmental interpretive center and the Moore Performing Arts Pavilion.

=== Swimming ===
The park includes a swimming pool that has two slides and a sprayground.

=== Holman Lake ===
Holman Lake is open year-round to fishing and boating. It is a "Big Bass Lake"; only bass 15 inches (38 cm) or longer may be kept, with a daily limit of four per angler. The lake has a native population of largemouth bass, catfish and panfish. It is stocked with brook, brown and rainbow trout. The high population of yellow perch is controlled by the Pennsylvania Fish and Boat Commission by stocking muskellunge and walleye. All of these fish are targeted by recreational fisherman on a year-round basis, from shore, boat and during the winter months on the ice cover. Electric-powered, gas-powered, and non-powered boats are permitted on the waters of Holman Lake with current registration from any state. Although gas-powered boats are permitted, the engine(s) are not allowed to be used. They must be powered by an electric motor or rowing. The lake is open in the winter for ice skating and ice fishing.

=== Hunting ===
Hunting is permitted on about 300 acres (1.2 km^{2}) of Little Buffalo State Park. Hunters are expected to follow the rules and regulations of the Pennsylvania Game Commission. The common game species are ruffed grouse, eastern gray squirrel, wild turkey, white-tailed deer, and eastern cottontail. The hunting of groundhogs is prohibited.

=== Trails ===
Little Buffalo has about 8 miles (13 km) of hiking trails and it holds a year-round Volksmarching event.

- Volksmarching is a traditional German recreational activity. Volksmarchers traverse a course that is 6 miles (9.7 km) long, marked by white arrows on Mill Race, Fisherman's, Buffalo Ridge, Little Buffalo Creek, Middle Ridge, Little Buffalo State Park Road and the Exercise Trail.
- Little Buffalo Creek Trail - Marked with blue blazes, this trail is 1 mile (1.6 km) length and is rated as an easy trail. It runs between the Main Picnic Area and the western end of the park.
- Exercise Trail is 1.2 miles (1.9 km) and follows an 18 station exercise course.
- Blue Ball Trail is 0.25 miles (0.40 km), paved, and is ADA accessible. It runs from the Blue Ball Tavern to the East Picnic Area.
- Fisherman's Trail - Marked with yellow blazes, this trail passes through a mature hemlock forest and is 1 mile (1.6 km) long. The temperature surrounding the trail is usually cool because of the density of the cover of the hemlocks. Very little plant life exists along the trail except for ferns and hemlock seedlings. The eastern end of the trail overlooks Holman Lake and the dam.
- Mill Race Trail - Marked with orange blazes. Mill Race Trail is an easy trail of 0.5 miles (0.80 km). It follows Furnace Run and the mill race for Shoaff's Mill. The race provides water power for the mill. Hikers on the trail get a first hand look at just how the mill race works.
- Middle Ridge Trail - Marked with red blazes is a difficult trail that runs 2.5 miles (4.0 km) from the Exercise Trail to the western end of the park. It has several short and steep climbs. The trail passes through a variety of habitats and passes the lake.
- Buffalo Ridge Trail, marked with white blazes, is a difficult trail that runs 1.5 miles (2.4 km) from the East Picnic Area to abandoned railbed of the Newport and Shermans Valley Railroad. This trails climbs Buffalo Ridge and passes the remains of the industrial past of the area. Hikers can see remains of the charcoal furnaces as they hike this trail.

All hiking trails are opened to cross-country skiing during the winter months.
