= List of Pennsylvania state historical markers in Perry County =

Location of Perry County in Pennsylvania

This is a list of the Pennsylvania state historical markers in Perry County.

This is intended to be a complete list of the official state historical markers placed in Perry County, Pennsylvania by the Pennsylvania Historical and Museum Commission (PHMC). The locations of the historical markers, as well as the latitude and longitude coordinates as provided by the PHMC's database, are included below when available. There are 15 historical markers located in Perry County.

== Historical markers ==
Marker title	Image	Date dedicated	Location	Marker type	Topics
Carson Long Military Institute		May 9, 1987	N. Carlisle St. at school, New Bloomfield	Roadside	Education, Military, Military Post-Civil War
Centre Church		February 13, 1948	Junction Pa. 850 & Pa. 274, 2.1 miles W of Loysville (Missing)	Roadside	Buildings, Early Settlement, Religion
Dr. Reifsnyder		July 30, 1947	U.S. 11 & 15, Liverpool; 40.5735°N 76.9899°W	Roadside	Medicine & Science, Professions & Vocations, Religion, Women
Fort Robinson		April 28, 1947	Junction Pa. 274 & 850, 2. 1miles W of Loysville; 40.35867°N 77.38012°W	Roadside	Forts, French & Indian War, Military, Native American
James A. Beaver		April 19, 1948	Market & Sunbury Sts., in median at Sq., Millerstown; 40.54955°N 77.15495°W	Roadside	Civil War, Government & Politics, Government & Politics 19th Century, Governors, Military
John Bannister Gibson		July 25, 1947	Pa. 850, 1.2 miles W of Dromgold; 40.3519°N 77.21167°W	Roadside	Government & Politics, Government & Politics 19th Century, Governors
John Bannister Gibson - PLAQUE		September 1929	PA 850 at Mill Rd., 1 mile W of Dromgold	Plaque	Government & Politics 19th Century, Professions & Vocations
Lightning Guider Sleds		July 8, 1992	722 N. Market St., Duncannon; 40.3981°N 77.02307°W	Roadside	Business & Industry, Sports
Millersburg Ferry		May 20, 1973	U.S. 11 & 15 S of Liverpool, near junction Pa. 34; 40.5437°N 76.98773°W	Roadside	Business & Industry, Oil & Gas, Transportation
Pennsylvania Canal (Susquehanna Division)		June 12, 1952	US 11 & 15 at Island Rd. (Haldeman Is. entrance), just N of Rt. 322 interchange, N of Duncannon	Roadside	Canals, Government & Politics, Navigation, Railroads, Transportation
Pennsylvania Canal (Susquehanna Division)		June 12, 1952	U.S. 11 & 15 just N of Amity Hall, Duncannon (MISSING)	Roadside	Canals, Navigation, Transportation
Pennsylvania Canal (Susquehanna Division)		June 12, 1952	U.S. 11 & 15 just N of Liverpool (MISSING)	Roadside	Canals, Navigation, Transportation
Perry County		October 21, 1982	County Courthouse, on Square, New Bloomfield; 40.42°N 77.18687°W	City	Government & Politics, Government & Politics 19th Century, Governors
Rockville Bridge		September 21, 1986	U.S. 11 & 15 at N end of Marysville	Roadside	Bridges, Transportation
William Bigler (1814-1880)		July 3, 1951	Junction Pa. 34 & 850, Dromgold	Roadside	Government & Politics, Government & Politics 19th Century, Governors

== See also ==
- List of Pennsylvania state historical markers
- National Register of Historic Places listings in Perry County, Pennsylvania
