= Perry County Courthouse (Pennsylvania) =

- U.S. National Register of Historic Places
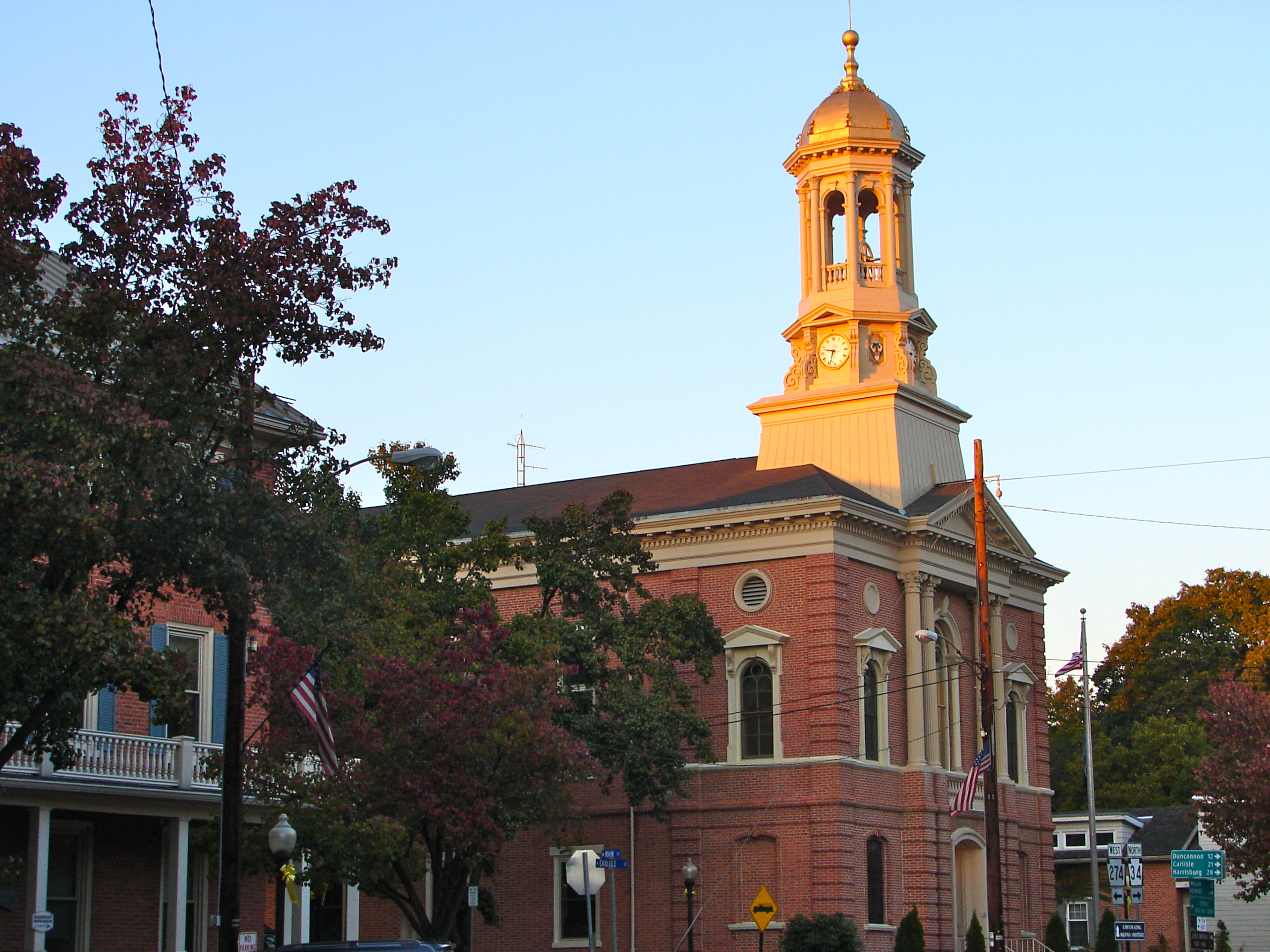
- Perry County Courthouse, October 2010

- Location within Pennsylvania Location within the United States
- Location: Center Sq., Bloomfield, Pennsylvania
- Coordinates: 40°25′12″N 77°11′15″W
- Area: 0.1 acres (0.040 ha)
- Built: 1827
- Architect: Bishop, Jacob; Duncan, James
- Architectural style: Greek Revival
- NRHP reference No.: 75001659
- Added to NRHP: February 24, 1975

The Perry County Courthouse is an historic courthouse building in New Bloomfield, Perry County, Pennsylvania, United States.

It was listed on the National Register of Historic Places in 1975.

== History and architectural features ==
Construction on this American courthouse began in 1826 and was completed the next year. The building was then extensively altered in 1868. Designed in the Greek Revival style, it is a two-story, white brick structure that is three bays wide and six bays long. The low-hipped roof is crowned by a cupola that dates to 1826. An annex was completed circa 1892.

== See also ==
- National Register of Historic Places listings in Perry County, Pennsylvania
- List of state and county courthouses in Pennsylvania
