= Waggoner Covered Bridge =

Covered bridge in Pennsylvania, US

- U.S. National Register of Historic Places
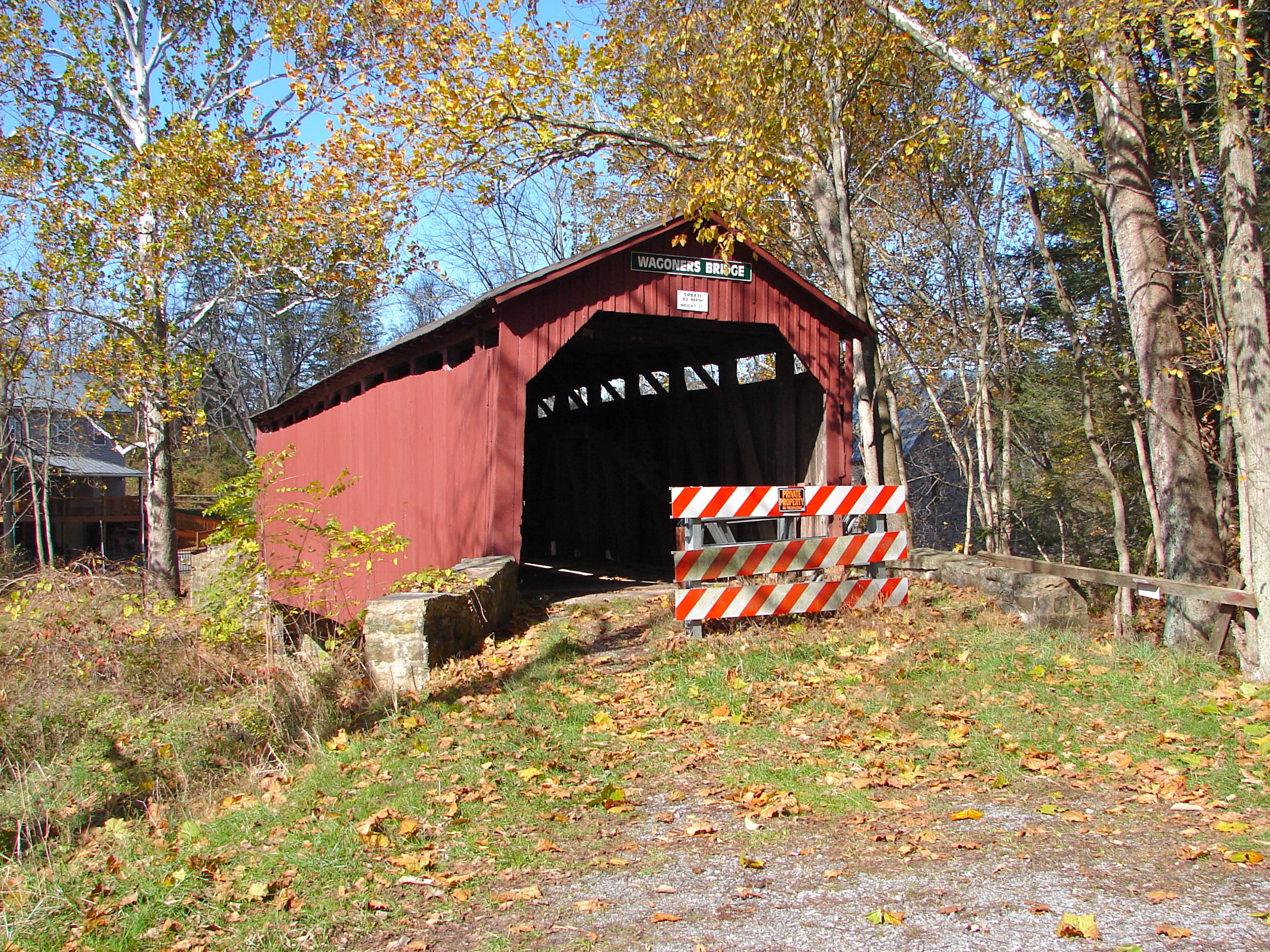
- Waggoner Covered Bridge, October 2010

- Location within Pennsylvania Location within the United States
- Location: West of Loysville on Township 579, Northeast Madison Township and Tyrone Township, Pennsylvania
- Coordinates: 40°21′34″N 77°22′23″W
- Area: 0.1 acres (0.040 ha)
- Built: 1889
- Architect: Lightner, Joseph Brady; of Loysville, PA
- Architectural style: Burr
- MPS: Covered Bridges of Adams, Cumberland, and Perry Counties TR
- NRHP reference No.: 80003598
- Added to NRHP: August 25, 1980

The Waggoner Covered Bridge, also known as the Roddy's Mill Covered Bridge, was an historic, wooden, covered bridge that was located in Northeast Madison Township and Tyrone Township in Perry County, Pennsylvania, United States.

Listed on the National Register of Historic Places in 1980, it was destroyed in a fire on October 21, 2021.

== History and architectural features ==
This historic structure was a 74-foot-long (23 m) Burr Truss bridge that was erected circa 1889 and crossed Bixler's Run. Its WGCB reference is 38-50-15.

On October 21, 2021 the bridge was destroyed in a fire.
