= Rice Covered Bridge =

Covered bridge in Pennsylvania, US

- U.S. National Register of Historic Places
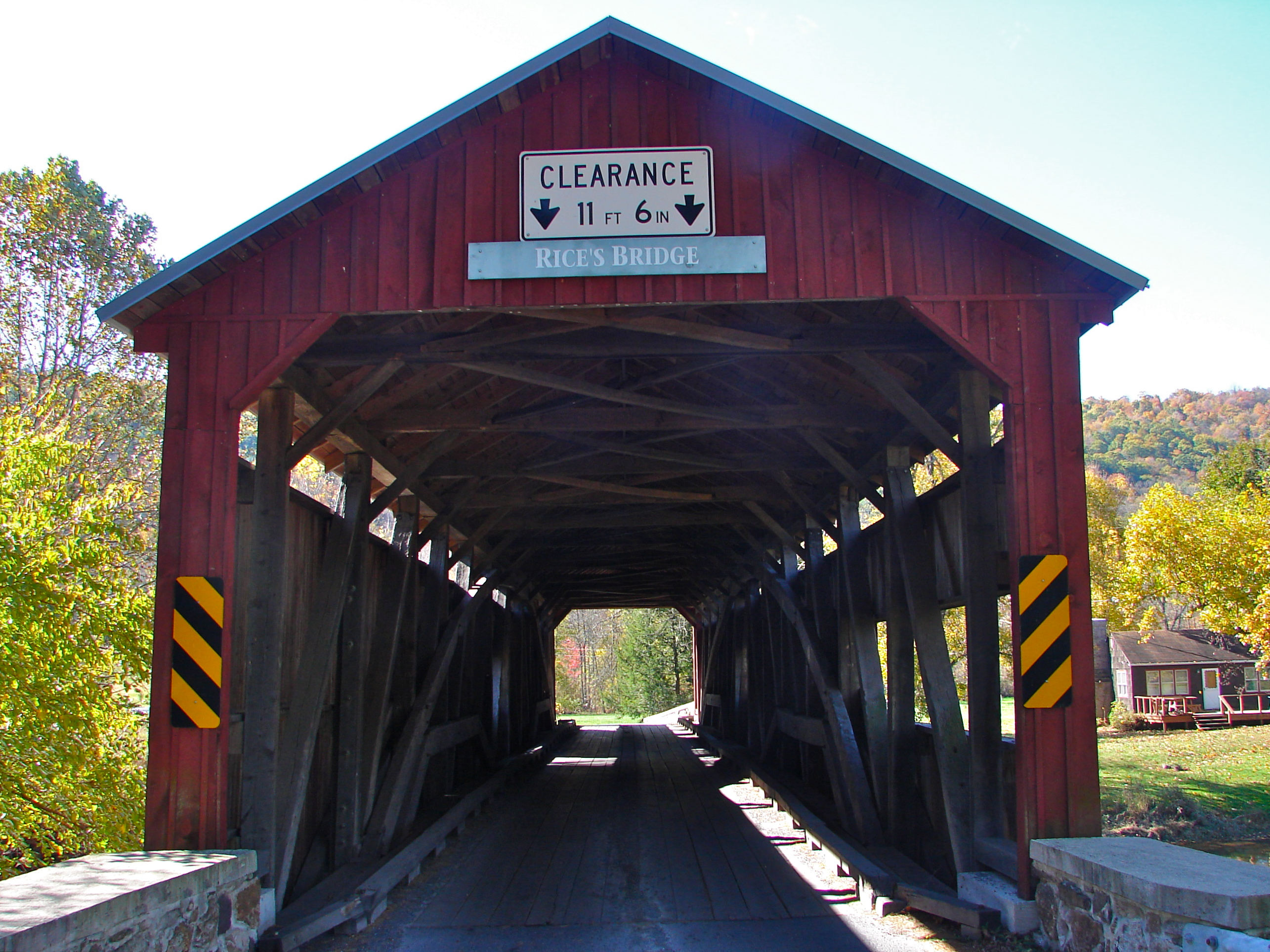
- Rice Covered Bridge, October 2010

- Location within Pennsylvania Location within the United States
- Location: South of Landisburg on Legislative Route 50023, Tyrone Township, Pennsylvania
- Coordinates: 40°20′9″N 77°18′34″W
- Area: 0.1 acres (0.040 ha)
- Built: 1869
- Architectural style: Burr, Queen Post
- MPS: Covered Bridges of Adams, Cumberland, and Perry Counties TR
- NRHP reference No.: 80003596
- Added to NRHP: August 25, 1980

The Rice Covered Bridge, also known as the Landisburg Covered Bridge, is an historic wooden covered bridge in Tyrone Township near Landisburg in Perry County, Pennsylvania, United States.

It was listed on the National Register of Historic Places in 1980.

== History and architectural features ==
This historic structure is a 123-foot-long (37 m) combination Burr truss and queen post bridge, constructed in 1869. It crosses Shermans Creek. Its WGCB reference is 38-50-10.

== Gallery ==
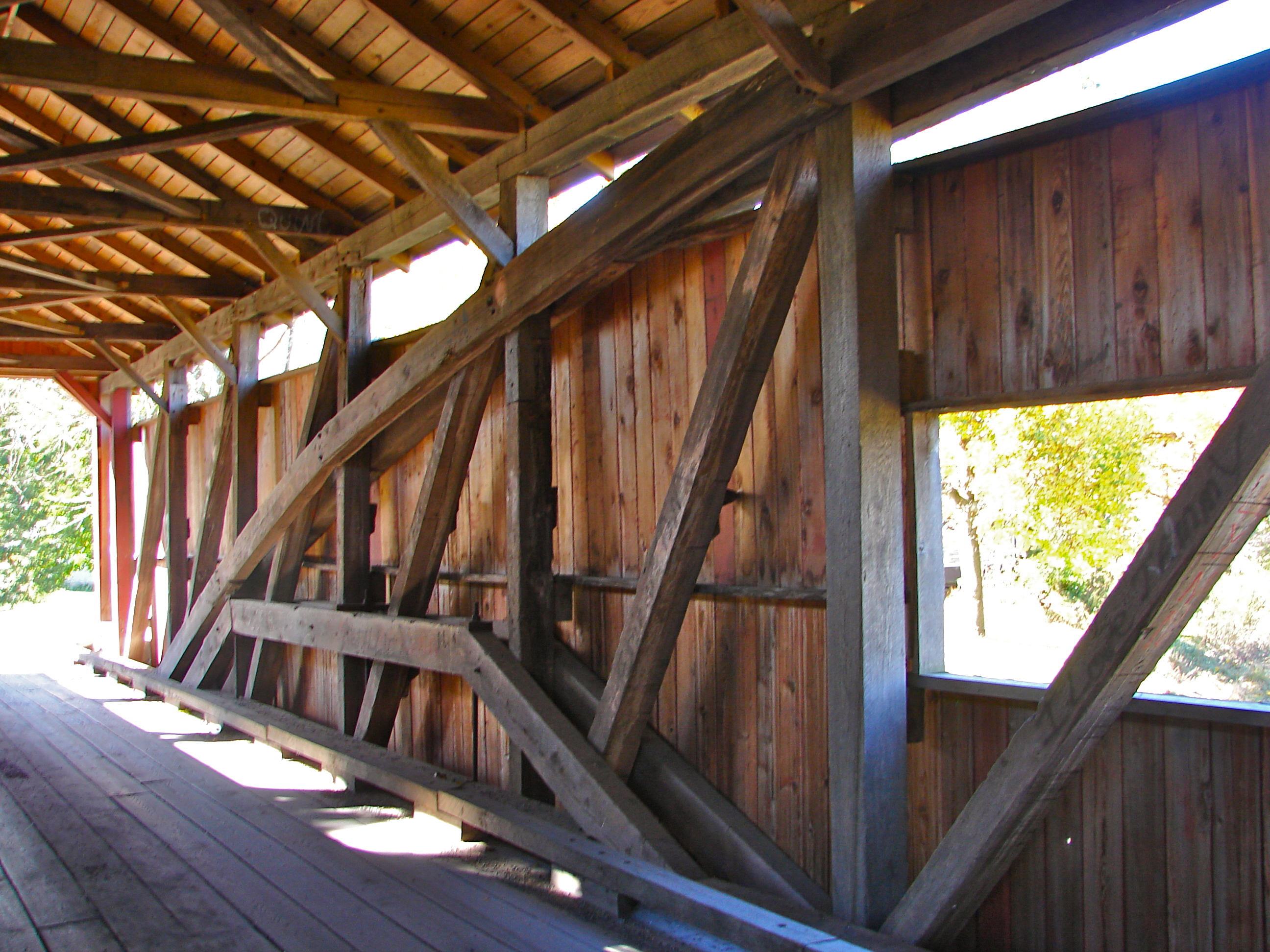
Interior, showing the rare combination of queen post and Burr arch trusses
