= Israel and Samuel Lupfer Tannery Site and House =

- U.S. National Register of Historic Places
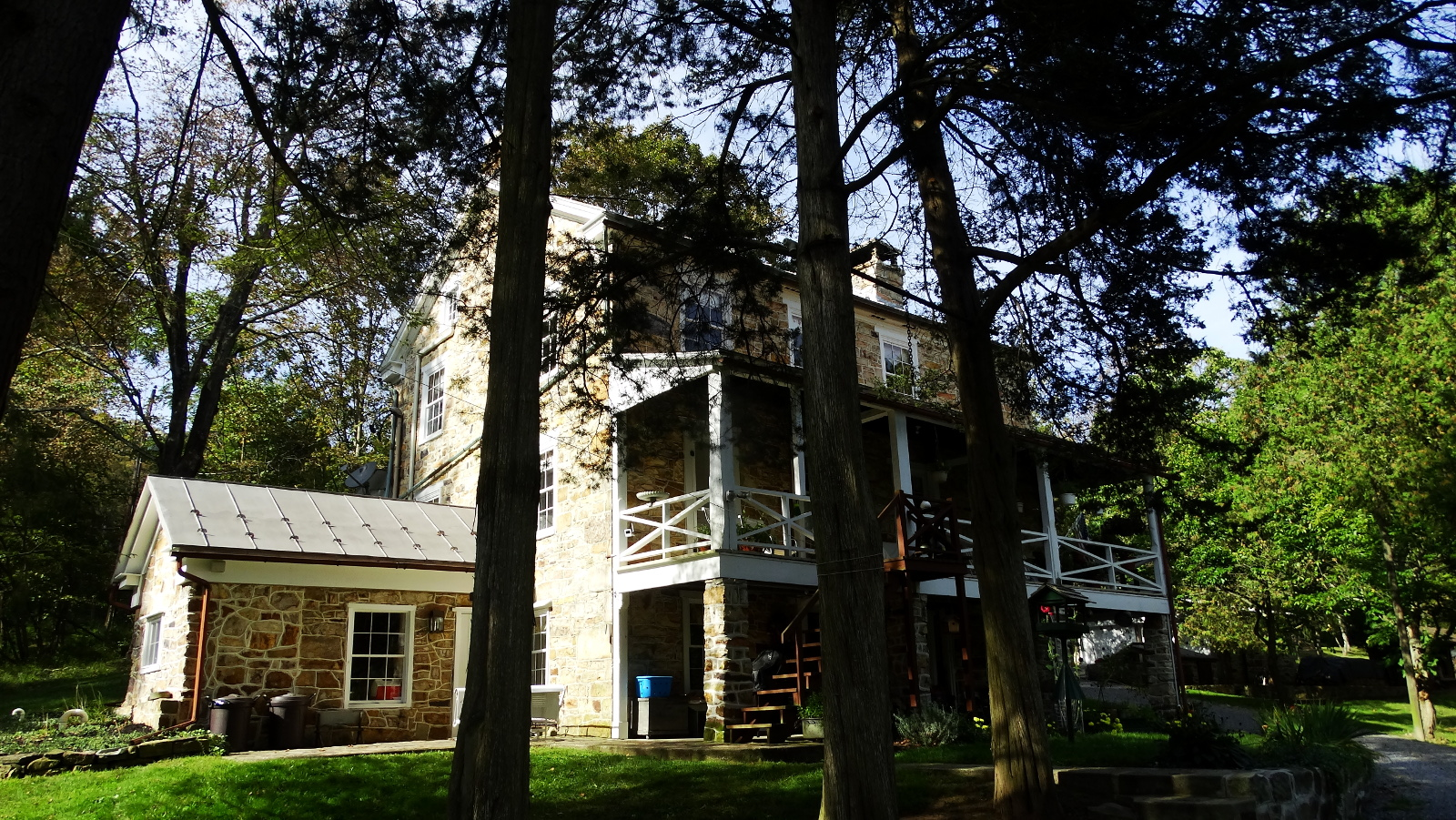

- Location within Pennsylvania Location within the United States
- Location: Back Hollow Rd.
- Nearest city: Jackson and Toboyne Townships
- Coordinates: 40°16′54.4″N 77°32′1.6″W
- Area: 0 acres (0 ha)
- NRHP reference No.: 03000493
- Added to NRHP: May 30, 2003

The Israel and Samuel Lupfer Tannery Site and House, also known as Monterey Tannery, is an historic home and tannery complex that is located at Toboyne Township in Perry County, Pennsylvania, United States.

It was listed on the National Register of Historic Places in 2003.

== History and architectural features ==
The site consists of the archaeological remains of a substantial nineteenth century tanning operation and a stone residence constructed in around 1852.

== See also ==
- List of European archaeological sites on the National Register of Historic Places in Pennsylvania
- National Register of Historic Places listings in Perry County, Pennsylvania
