= Dunbar-Creigh House =

Historic house in Pennsylvania, United States

- U.S. National Register of Historic Places
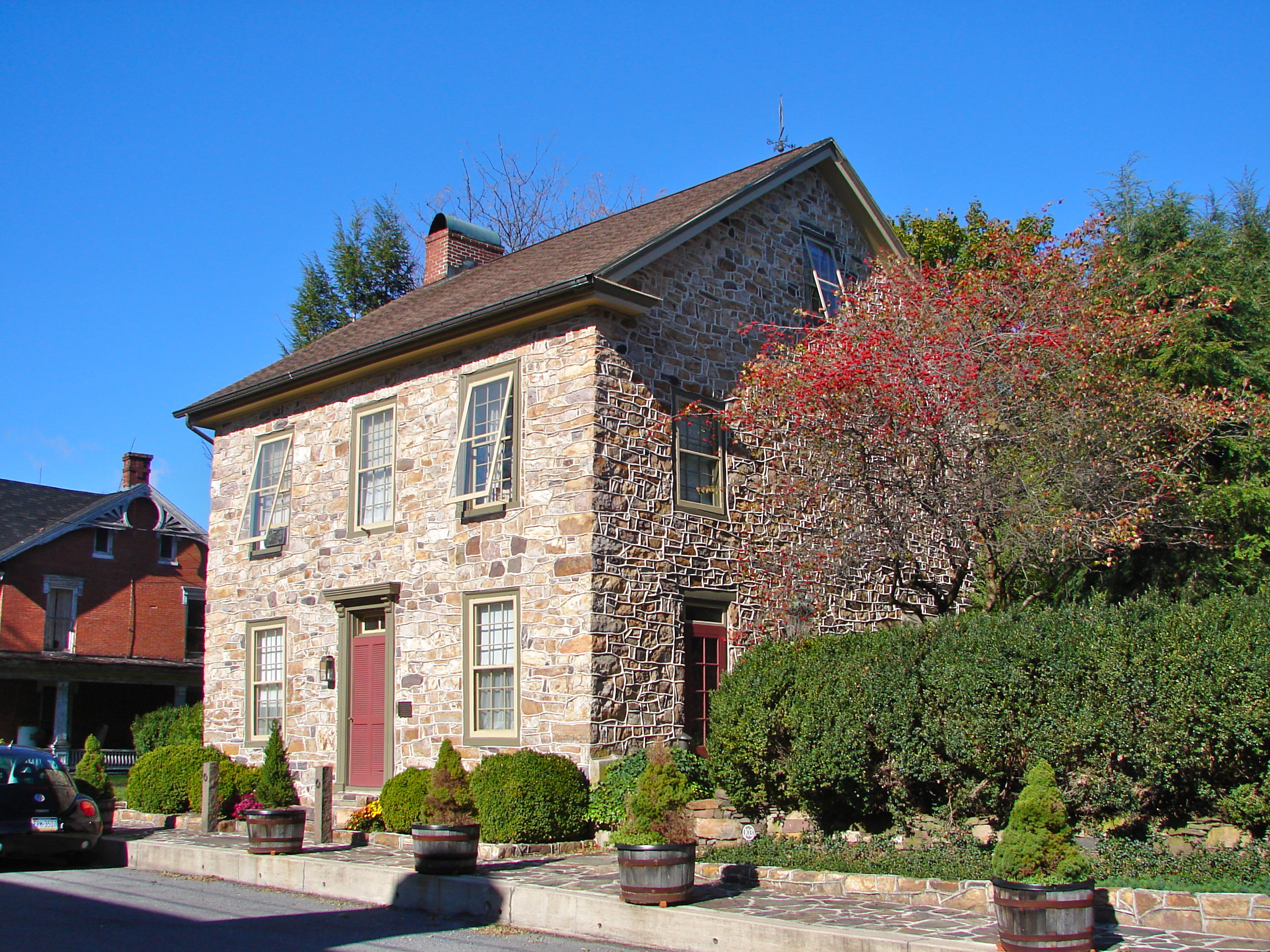
- Dunbar-Creigh House, October 2010

- Location within Pennsylvania Location within the United States
- Location: Water St., Landisburg, Pennsylvania, United States
- Coordinates: 40°20′30″N 77°18′25″W
- Area: 2 acres (0.81 ha)
- Built: 1809
- Architect: Dunbar, John
- NRHP reference No.: 80003595
- Added to NRHP: June 27, 1980

Dunbar-Creigh House, also known as Lawrence Inn, is a historic home located at Landisburg in Perry County, Pennsylvania. It is a 2 1/2-story stone house built between 1794 and 1809. The structure measures 28 by 30 feet (8.5 by 9.1 m) and is built into the bank of a hillside.

It was listed on the National Register of Historic Places in 1980.
