= Southwest Madison Township, Pennsylvania =

Township in Pennsylvania, US

Coordinates: 40°20′00″N 77°24′59″W

- Township
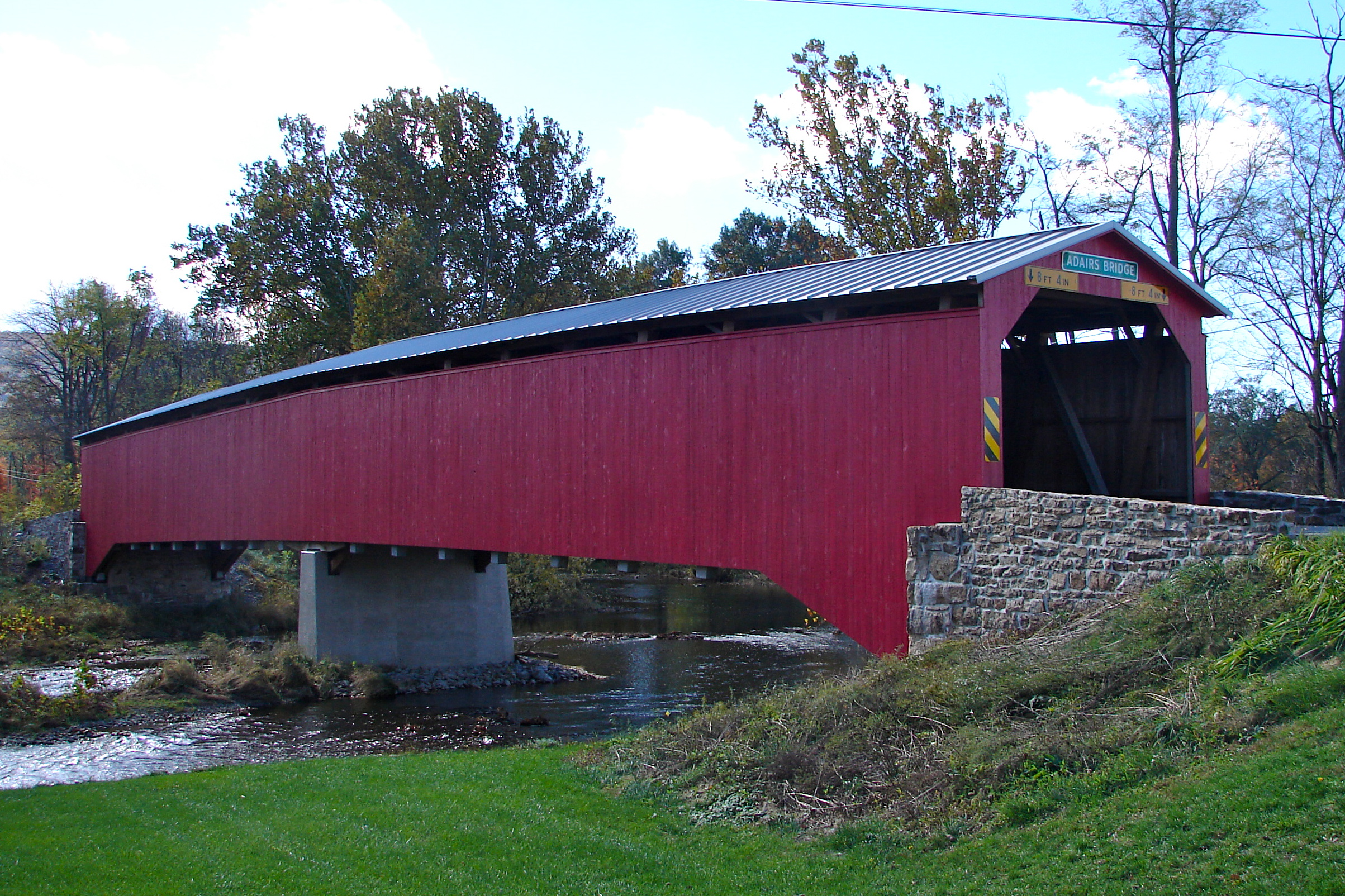
- Adairs Covered Bridge

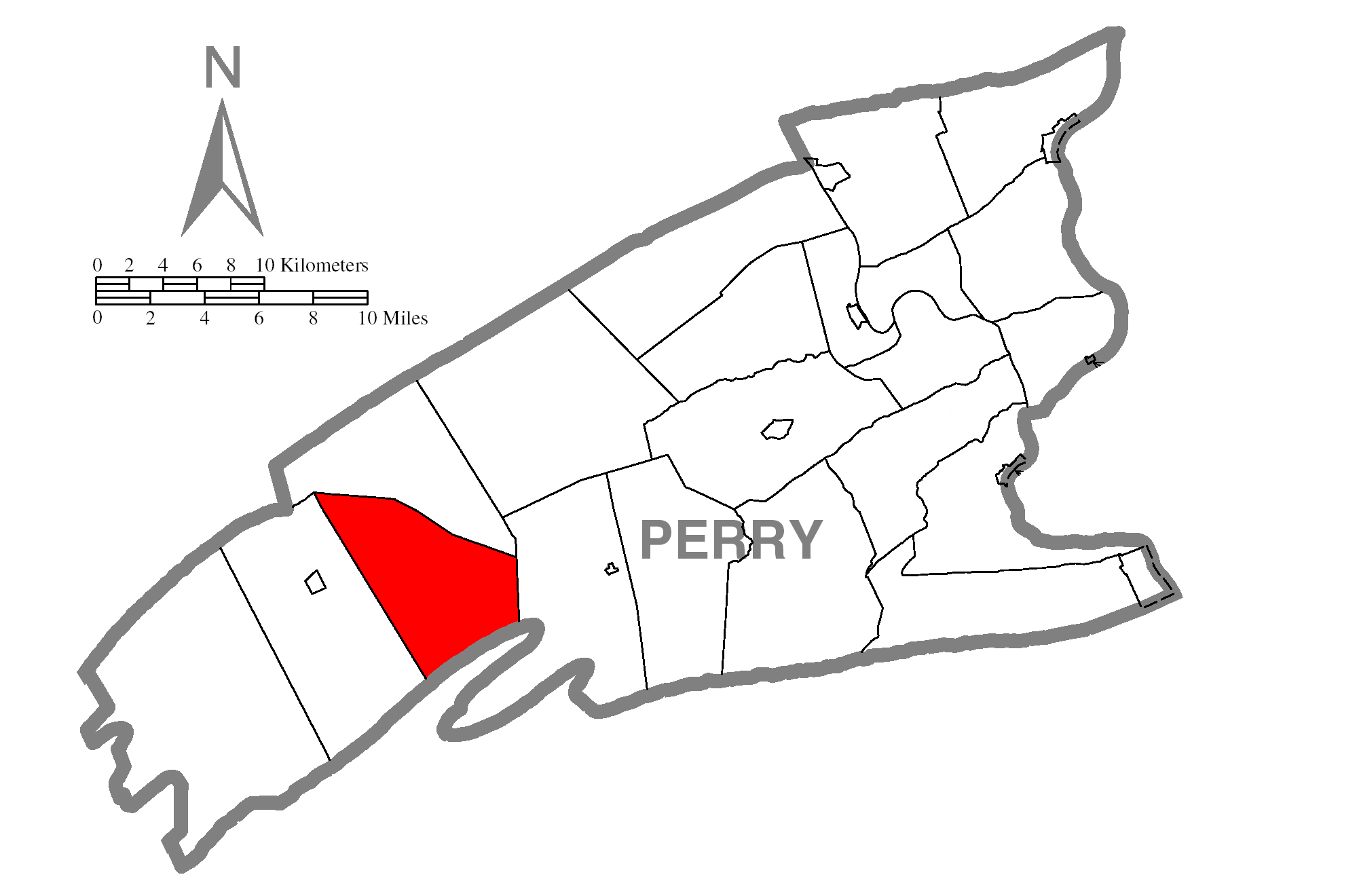
- Map of Perry County, Pennsylvania highlighting Southwest Madison Township

- Map of Perry County, Pennsylvania
- Country: United States
- State: Pennsylvania
- County: Perry
- Settled: 1755
- Incorporated: 1755

Area
  - Total: 27.53 sq mi (71.31 km^{2})
  - Land: 27.36 sq mi (70.86 km^{2})
  - Water: 0.17 sq mi (0.45 km^{2})

Population (2020)
  - Total: 1,021 ▲
  - Estimate (2023): 1,027
  - Density: 36.2/sq mi (13.96/km^{2})
- Time zone: UTC-5 (Eastern (EST))
  - Summer (DST): UTC-4 (EDT)
- Area code: 717
- FIPS code: 42-099-72624

Southwest Madison Township is a township in Perry County, Pennsylvania, United States. The population was 1,021 at the 2020 census.

== History ==
The Adairs Covered Bridge and Bistline Covered Bridge are listed on the National Register of Historic Places.

== Geography ==
According to the United States Census Bureau, the township has a total area of 27.6 square miles (71.4 km^{2}), of which 27.5 square miles (71.4 km^{2}) is land and 0.04% is water.

== Demographics ==
Historical population
Census	Pop.	Note	%±
2010	999		—
2020	1,021		2.2%
2023 (est.)	1,027		0.6%
U.S. Decennial Census

As of the census of 2000, there were 856 people, 292 households, and 226 families residing in the township. The population density was 31.1 inhabitants per square mile (12.0/km^{2}). There were 395 housing units at an average density of 14.3/sq mi (5.5/km^{2}). The racial makeup of the township was 99.88% White, and 0.12% from two or more races.

There were 292 households, out of which 34.2% had children under the age of 18 living with them, 68.5% were married couples living together, 5.8% had a female householder with no husband present, and 22.6% were non-families. 20.2% of all households were made up of individuals, and 12.0% had someone living alone who was 65 years of age or older. The average household size was 2.93 and the average family size was 3.41.

In the township the population was spread out, with 29.3% under the age of 18, 10.5% from 18 to 24, 24.6% from 25 to 44, 22.4% from 45 to 64, and 13.1% who were 65 years of age or older. The median age was 35 years. For every 100 females, there were 101.4 males. For every 100 females age 18 and over, there were 99.7 males.

The median income for a household in the township was $35,694, and the median income for a family was $41,458. Males had a median income of $30,446 versus $23,182 for females. The per capita income for the township was $14,457. About 13.2% of families and 18.8% of the population were below the poverty line, including 32.3% of those under age 18 and 17.4% of those age 65 or over.
