= Northeast Madison Township, Pennsylvania =

Township in Pennsylvania, US

Coordinates: 40°22′29″N 77°22′35″W

- Township
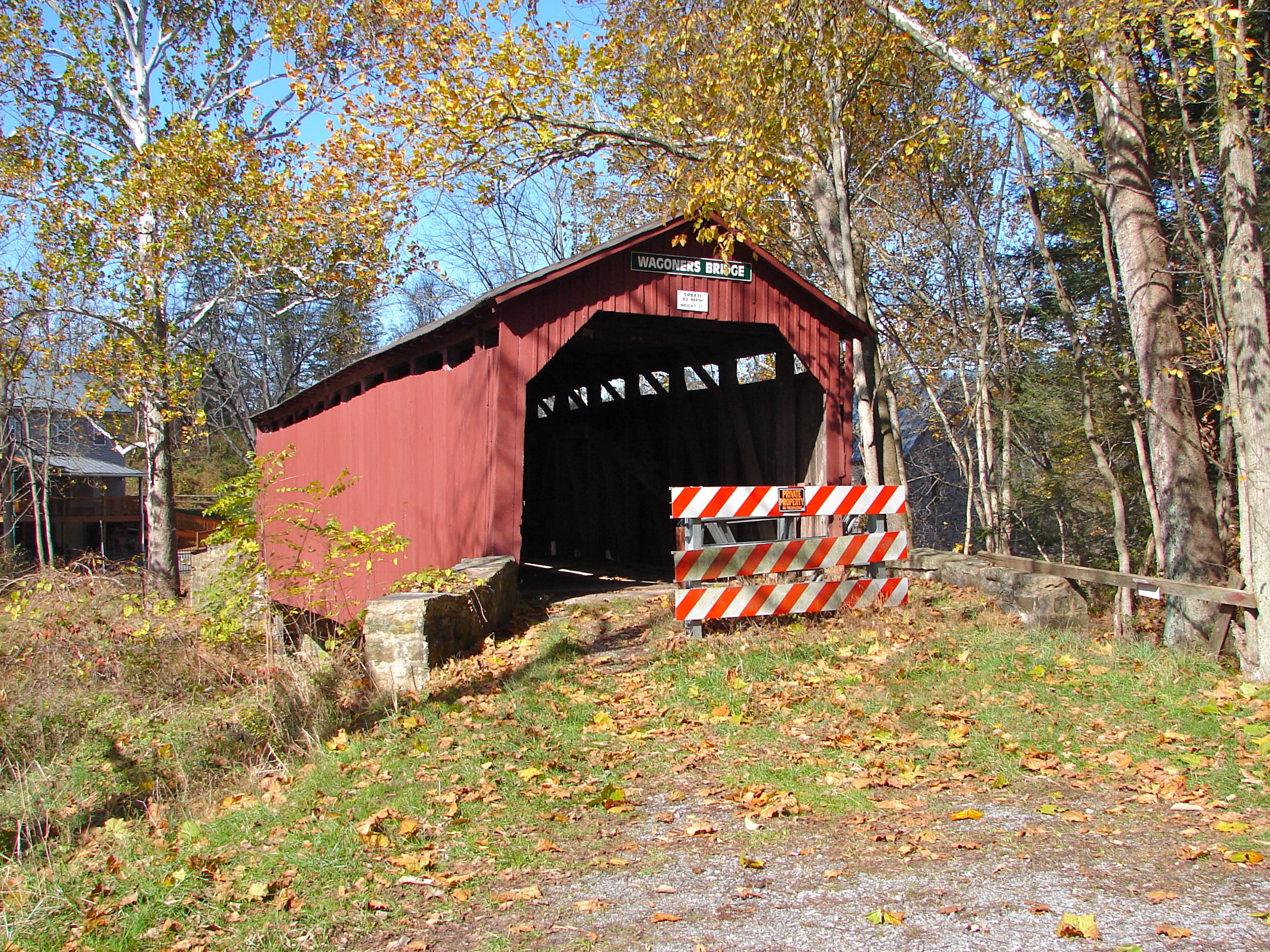
- Waggoner Covered Bridge

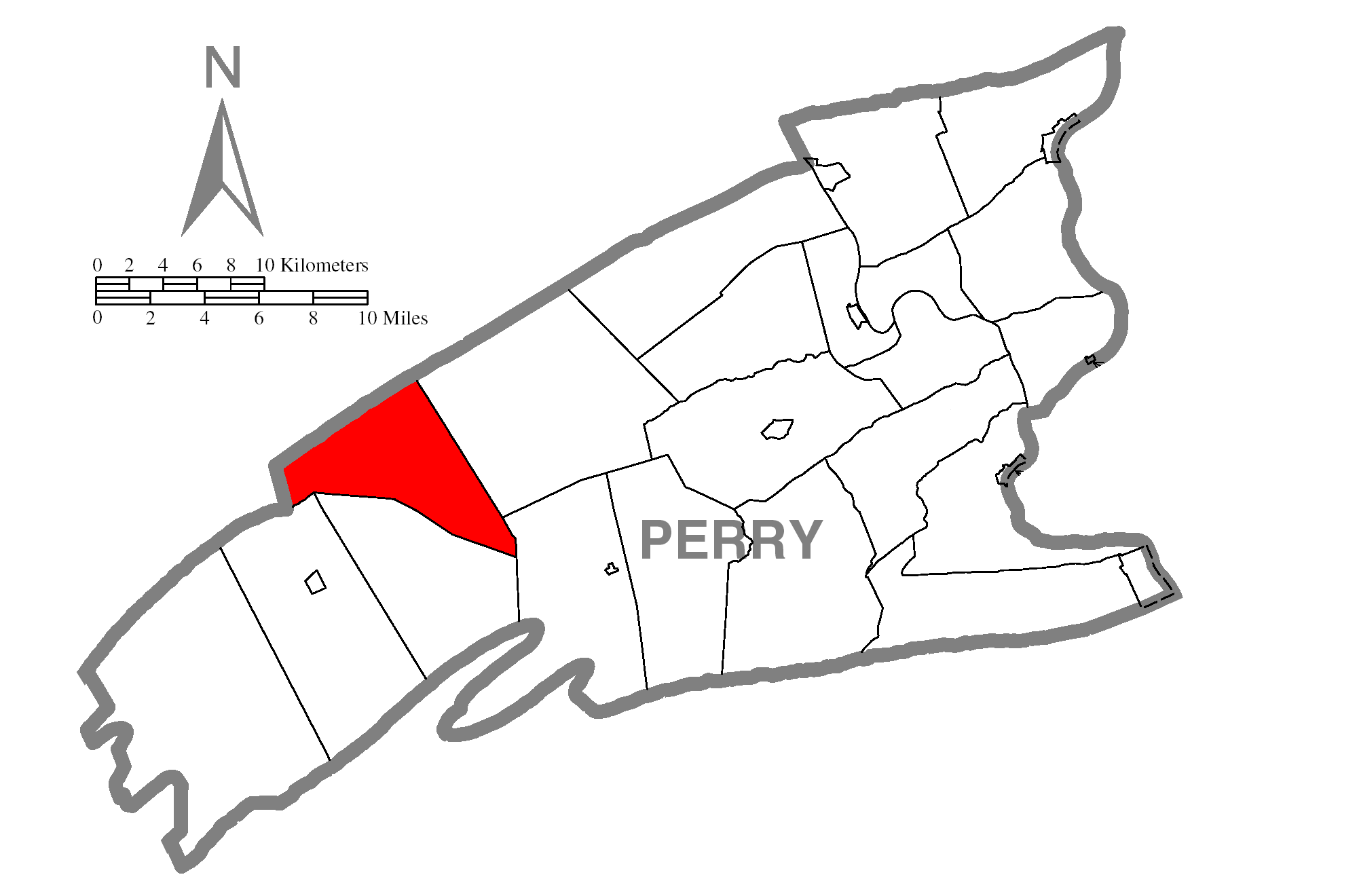
- Map of Perry County, Pennsylvania highlighting Northeast Madison Township

- Map of Perry County, Pennsylvania
- Country: United States
- State: Pennsylvania
- County: Perry
- Settled: 1755
- Incorporated: 1755

Area
  - Total: 25.81 sq mi (66.84 km^{2})
  - Land: 25.77 sq mi (66.74 km^{2})
  - Water: 0.039 sq mi (0.10 km^{2})

Population (2020)
  - Total: 827 ▲
  - Estimate (2023): 833
  - Density: 30.6/sq mi (11.81/km^{2})
- Time zone: UTC-5 (Eastern (EST))
  - Summer (DST): UTC-4 (EDT)
- Area code: 717
- FIPS code: 42-099-54968

Northeast Madison Township is a township in Perry County, Pennsylvania, United States. The population was 827 at the 2020 census.

== History ==
The Waggoner Covered Bridge was added to the National Register of Historic Places in 1980.

== Geography ==
According to the United States Census Bureau, the township has a total area of 25.8 square miles (66.8 km^{2}), of which 25.8 square miles (66.8 km^{2}) is land and 0.04% is water.

== Demographics ==
Historical population
Census	Pop.	Note	%±
2010	786		—
2020	827		5.2%
2023 (est.)	833		0.7%
U.S. Decennial Census

As of the census of 2000, there were 856 people, 265 households, and 215 families living in the township. The population density was 33.2 inhabitants per square mile (12.8/km^{2}). There were 400 housing units at an average density of 15.5/sq mi (6.0/km^{2}). The racial makeup of the township was 90.77% White, 5.26% African American, 0.35% Native American, 0.23% Asian, 0.12% Pacific Islander, 1.75% from other races, and 1.52% from two or more races. Hispanic or Latino of any race were 3.27% of the population.

There were 265 households, out of which 35.8% had children under the age of 18 living with them, 75.5% were married couples living together, 4.9% had a female householder with no husband present, and 18.5% were non-families. 16.6% of all households were made up of individuals, and 5.7% had someone living alone who was 65 years of age or older. The average household size was 2.85 and the average family size was 3.22.

In the township the population was spread out, with 34.0% under the age of 18, 8.5% from 18 to 24, 23.6% from 25 to 44, 23.9% from 45 to 64, and 9.9% who were 65 years of age or older. The median age was 33 years. For every 100 females, there were 137.8 males. For every 100 females age 18 and over, there were 119.0 males.

The median income for a household in the township was $37,125, and the median income for a family was $45,000. Males had a median income of $31,500 versus $21,923 for females. The per capita income for the township was $13,083. About 15.0% of families and 19.1% of the population were below the poverty line, including 26.7% of those under age 18 and 21.4% of those age 65 or over.
