= Centre Township, Perry County, Pennsylvania =

Township in Pennsylvania, US

Coordinates: 40°25′00″N 77°15′59″W

- Township
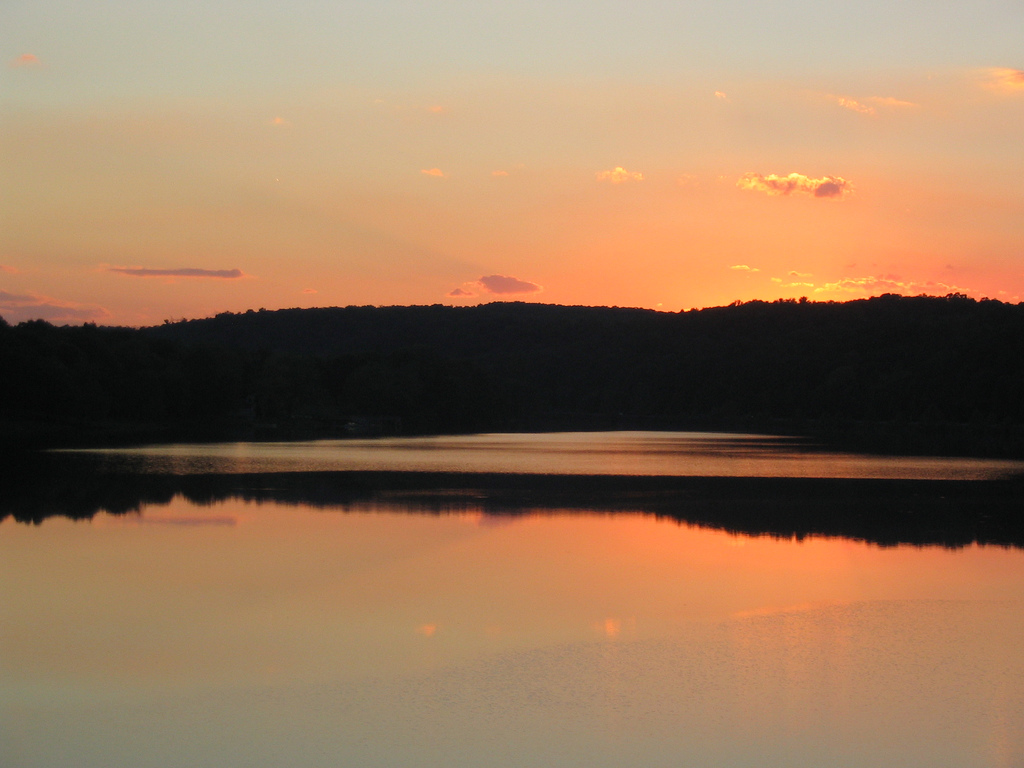
- Sunset at Little Buffalo State Park

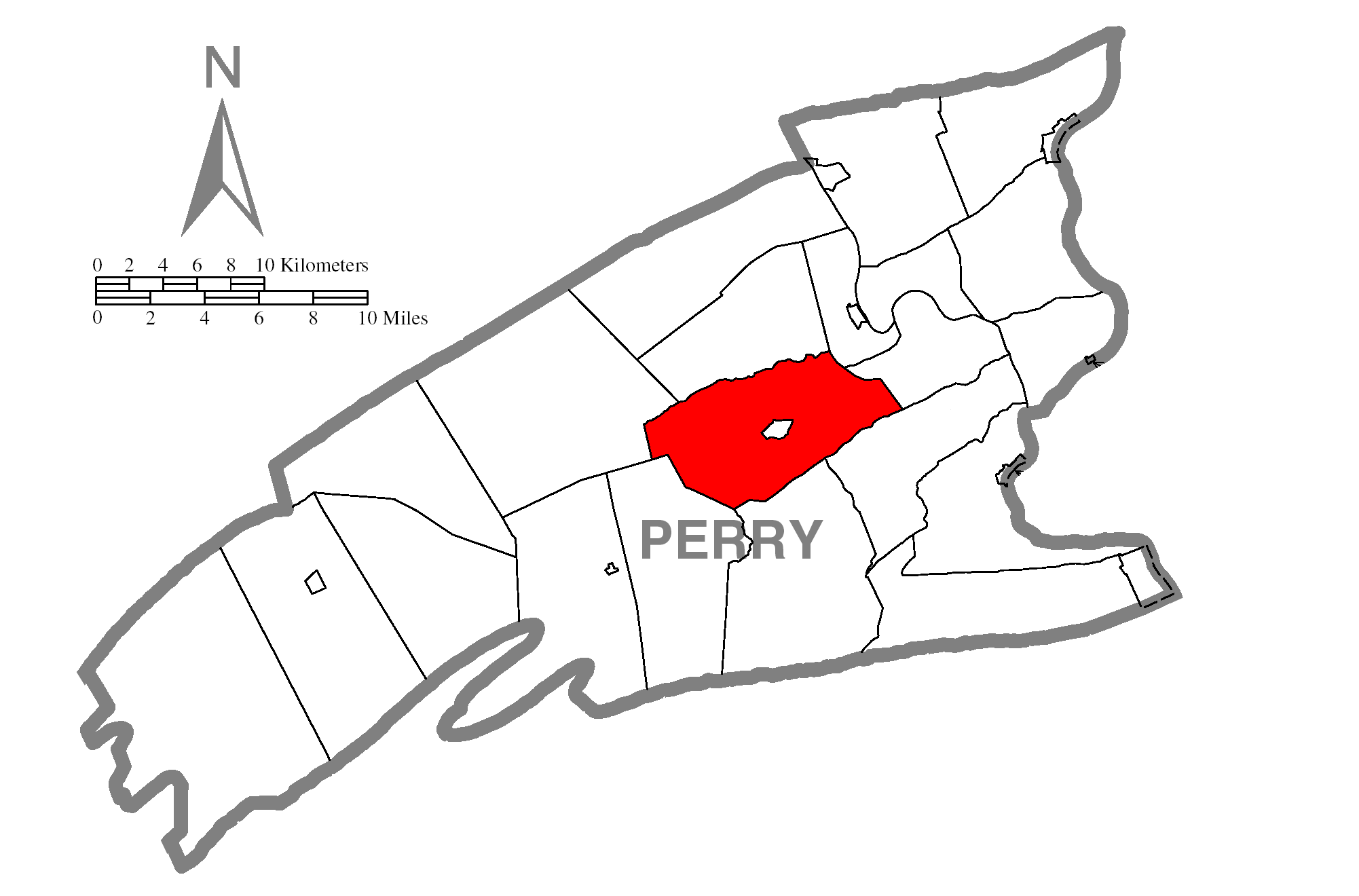
- Map of Perry County, Pennsylvania highlighting Centre Township

- Map of Perry County, Pennsylvania
- Country: United States
- State: Pennsylvania
- County: Perry
- Settled: 1752
- Incorporated: 1831

Area
  - Total: 30.13 sq mi (78.03 km^{2})
  - Land: 30.02 sq mi (77.76 km^{2})
  - Water: 0.11 sq mi (0.28 km^{2})

Population (2020)
  - Total: 2,516 ▲
  - Estimate (2023): 2,534
  - Density: 82.9/sq mi (32.02/km^{2})
- Time zone: UTC-5 (Eastern (EST))
  - Summer (DST): UTC-4 (EDT)
- Area code: 717
- FIPS code: 42-099-12360
- Website: centretwpperryco.com

Centre Township is a township in Perry County, Pennsylvania, United States. The population was 2,516 at the 2020 census.

== History ==
The Little Buffalo Historic District was added to the National Register of Historic Places in 1978.

== Geography ==
According to the United States Census Bureau, the township has a total area of 30.2 square miles (78 km^{2}), of which 30.2 square miles (78 km^{2}) is land and 0.1 square miles (0.26 km^{2}) (0.23%) is water.

== Demographics ==
Historical population
Census	Pop.	Note	%±
2010	2,491		—
2020	2,516		1.0%
2023 (est.)	2,534		0.7%
U.S. Decennial Census

As of the census of 2000, there were 2,209 people, 843 households, and 655 families living in the township. The population density was 73.2 inhabitants per square mile (28.3/km^{2}). There were 897 housing units at an average density of 29.7 per square mile (11.5/km^{2}). The racial makeup of the township was 98.87% White, 0.23% African American, 0.14% Asian, 0.05% Pacific Islander, 0.32% from other races, and 0.41% from two or more races. Hispanic or Latino of any race were 0.50% of the population.

There were 843 households, out of which 35.0% had children under the age of 18 living with them, 65.6% were married couples living together, 7.1% had a female householder with no husband present, and 22.3% were non-families. 17.8% of all households were made up of individuals, and 5.2% had someone living alone who was 65 years of age or older. The average household size was 2.62 and the average family size was 2.94.

In the township the population was spread out, with 24.7% under the age of 18, 7.4% from 18 to 24, 31.0% from 25 to 44, 27.7% from 45 to 64, and 9.2% who were 65 years of age or older. The median age was 38 years. For every 100 females there were 99.9 males. For every 100 females age 18 and over, there were 102.9 males.

The median income for a household in the township was $43,900, and the median income for a family was $49,393. Males had a median income of $33,750 versus $26,581 for females. The per capita income for the township was $19,057. About 3.8% of families and 6.1% of the population were below the poverty line, including 7.9% of those under age 18 and 6.5% of those age 65 or over.
