= New Germantown Covered Bridge =

- U.S. National Register of Historic Places
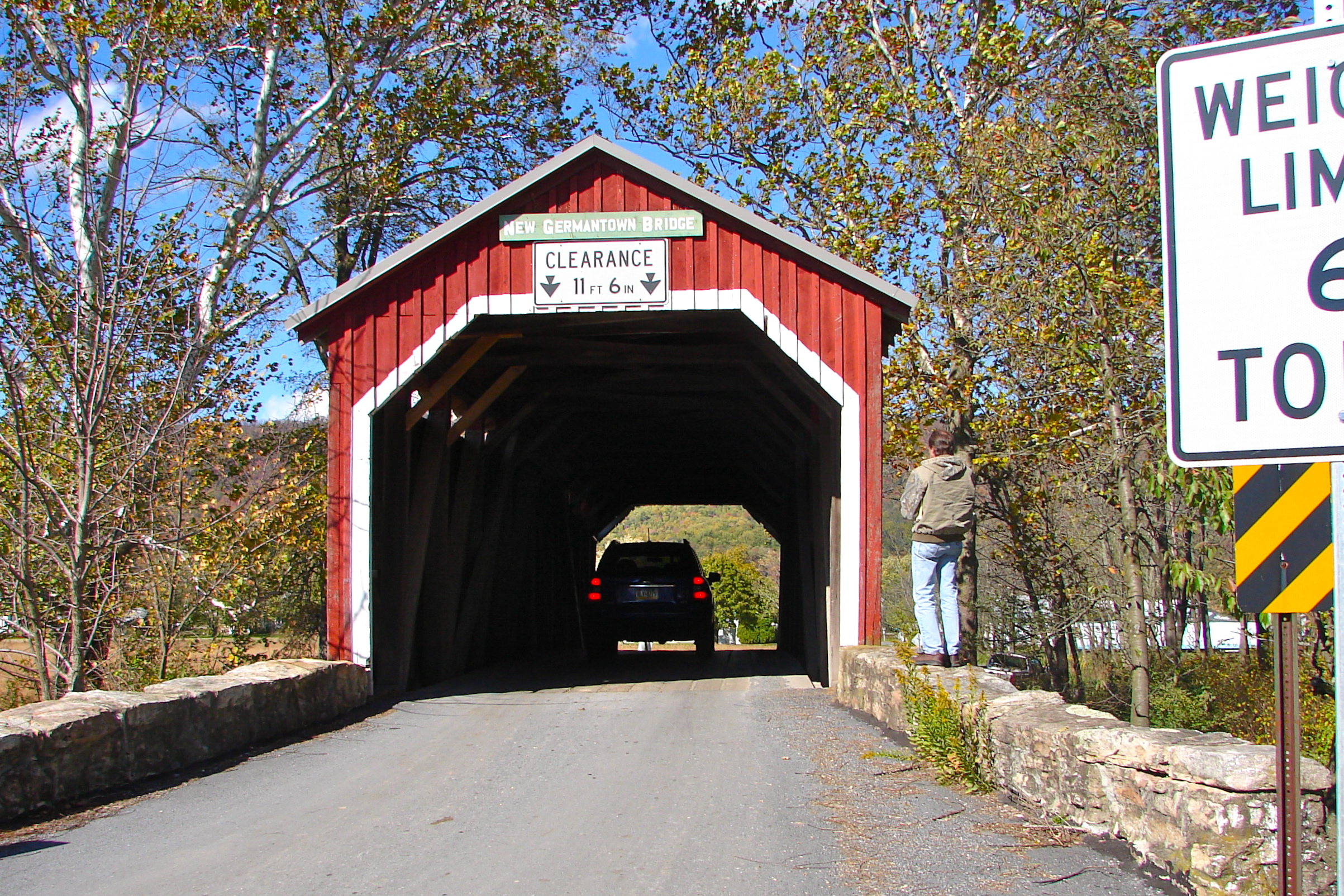
- New Germantown Covered Bridge, October 2010

- Location within Pennsylvania Location within the United States
- Location: S of New Germantown on T 302, Jackson Township, Pennsylvania
- Coordinates: 40°18′24″N 77°34′6″W
- Area: 0.1 acres (0.040 ha)
- Built: 1891
- Architect: Fry, John W.
- Architectural style: M.King, Queen
- MPS: Covered Bridges of Adams, Cumberland, and Perry Counties TR
- NRHP reference No.: 80003600
- Added to NRHP: August 25, 1980

The New Germantown Covered Bridge is a historic wooden covered bridge located in Jackson Township, Perry County, Pennsylvania, near New Germantown. Constructed in 1891, it is a 74-foot-long (23 m) King post bridge and crosses Shermans Creek.

It was listed on the National Register of Historic Places in 1980.
