= Jackson Township, Perry County, Pennsylvania =

Township in Pennsylvania, US

Coordinates: 40°14′30″N 77°29′29″W

- Township
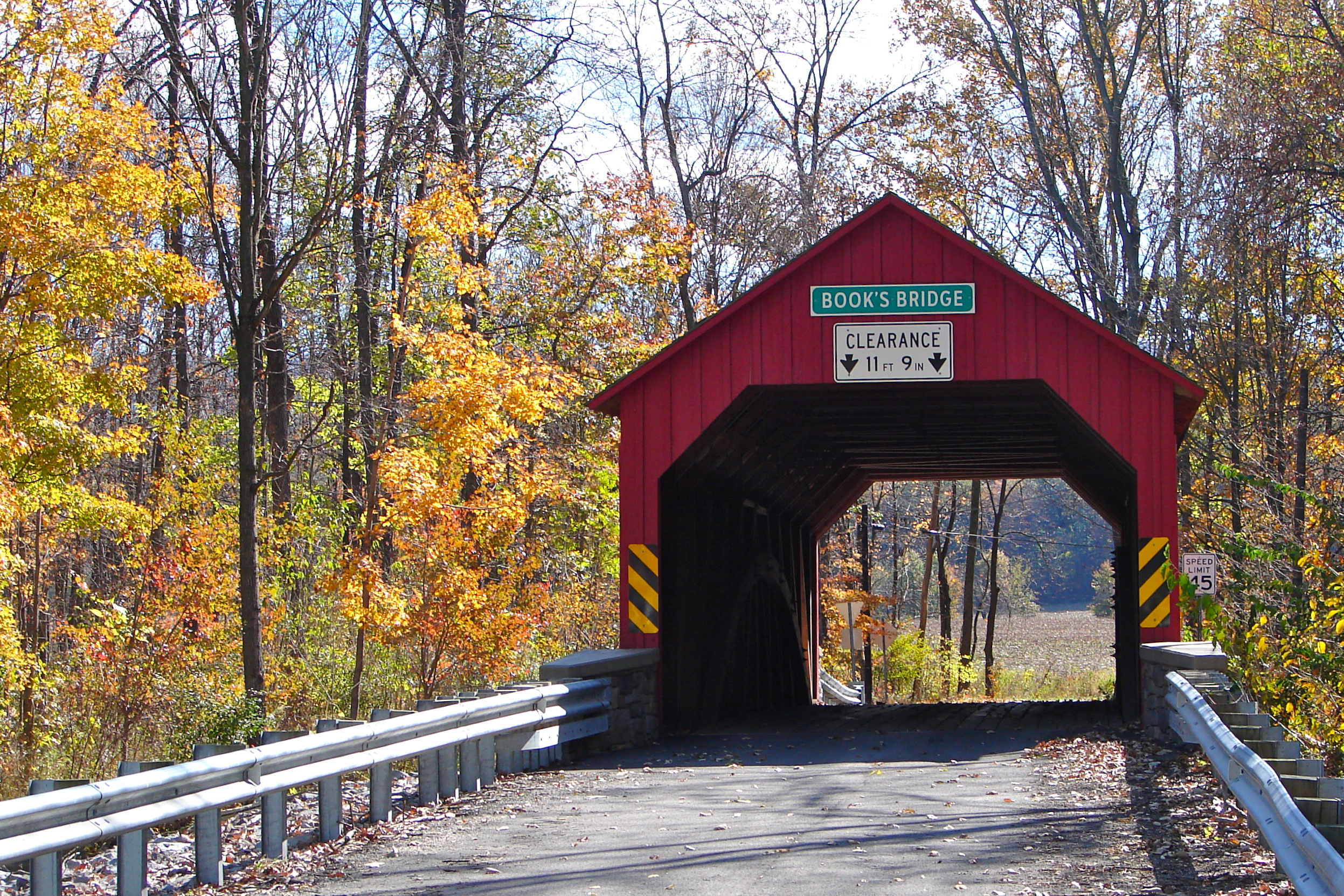
- Book's Covered Bridge

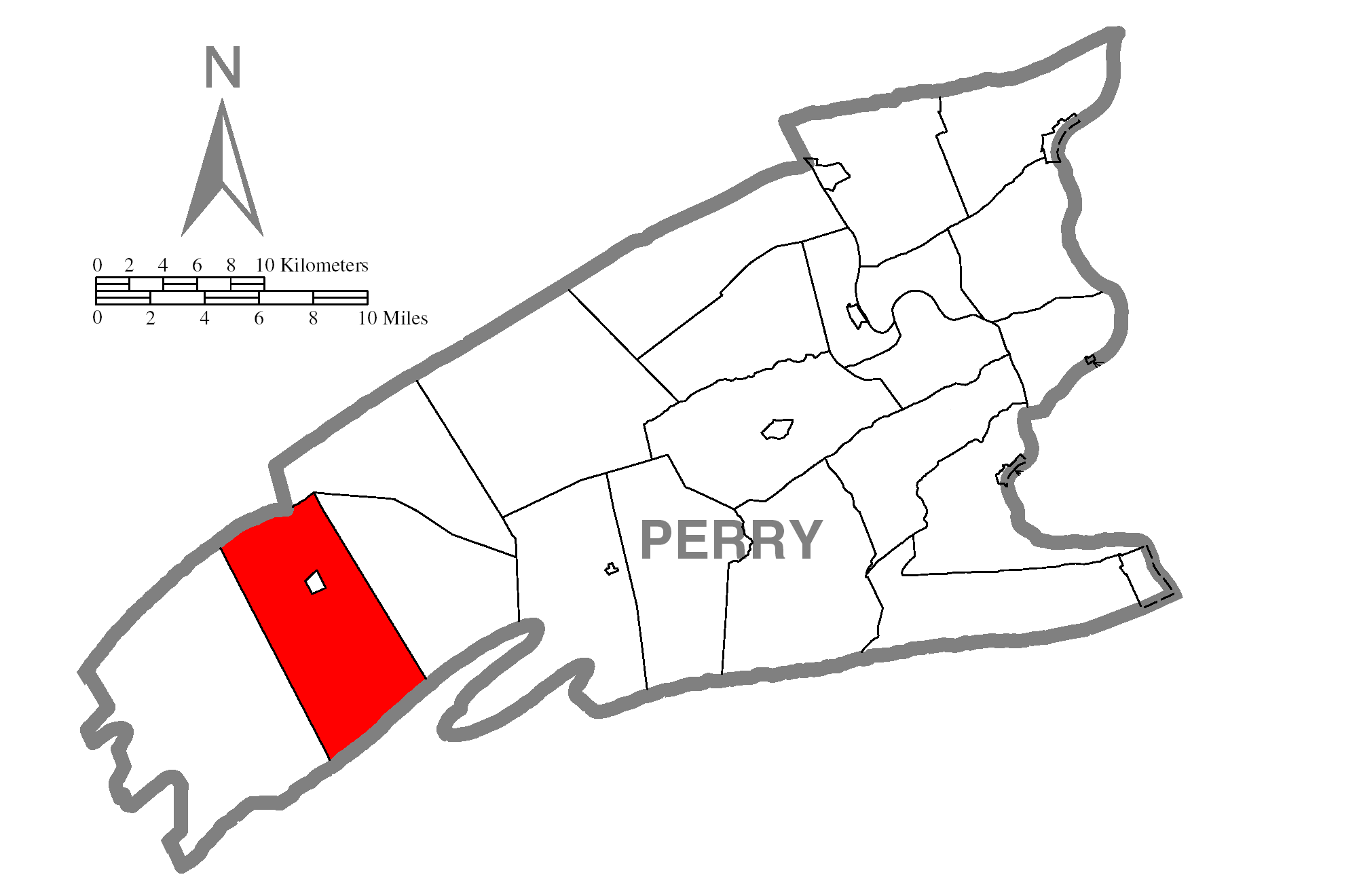
- Map of Perry County, Pennsylvania highlighting Jackson Township

- Map of Perry County, Pennsylvania
- Country: United States
- State: Pennsylvania
- County: Perry
- Settled: 1755
- Incorporated: 1844

Area
  - Total: 37.31 sq mi (96.64 km^{2})
  - Land: 37.17 sq mi (96.26 km^{2})
  - Water: 0.15 sq mi (0.38 km^{2})

Population (2020)
  - Total: 589 ▲
  - Estimate (2023): 592
  - Density: 14.6/sq mi (5.64/km^{2})
- Time zone: UTC-5 (Eastern (EST))
  - Summer (DST): UTC-4 (EDT)
- Area code: 717
- FIPS code: 42-099-37440

Jackson Township is a township in Perry County, Pennsylvania, United States. The population was 589 at the 2020 census.

== History ==
The Israel and Samuel Lupfer Tannery Site and House, Book's Covered Bridge, Mount Pleasant Covered Bridge, and New Germantown Covered Bridge are listed on the National Register of Historic Places.

== Geography ==
According to the United States Census Bureau, the township has a total area of 37.3 square miles (97 km^{2}), all land.

== Demographics ==
Historical population
Census	Pop.	Note	%±
2010	547		—
2020	589		7.7%
2023 (est.)	592		0.5%
U.S. Decennial Census

As of the census of 2000, there were 525 people, 182 households, and 143 families living in the township. The population density was 14.1 people per square mile (5.4/km^{2}). There were 264 housing units at an average density of 7.1/sq mi (2.7/km^{2}). The racial makeup of the township was 99.05% White, 0.19% African American, 0.19% from other races, and 0.57% from two or more races. Hispanic or Latino of any race were 0.38% of the population.

There were 182 households, out of which 32.4% had children under the age of 18 living with them, 67.6% were married couples living together, 6.0% had a female householder with no husband present, and 21.4% were non-families. 20.9% of all households were made up of individuals, and 11.0% had someone living alone who was 65 years of age or older. The average household size was 2.88 and the average family size was 3.34.

In the township the population was spread out, with 30.5% under the age of 18, 10.3% from 18 to 24, 25.0% from 25 to 44, 18.3% from 45 to 64, and 16.0% who were 65 years of age or older. The median age was 34 years. For every 100 females, there were 111.7 males. For every 100 females age 18 and over, there were 101.7 males.

The median income for a household in the township was $37,054, and the median income for a family was $39,821. Males had a median income of $30,000 versus $17,679 for females. The per capita income for the township was $16,005. About 11.6% of families and 18.2% of the population were below the poverty line, including 29.7% of those under age 18 and 8.5% of those age 65 or over.
