= Little Buffalo Historic District =

Historic district in Pennsylvania, United States

- U.S. National Register of Historic Places
- U.S. Historic district
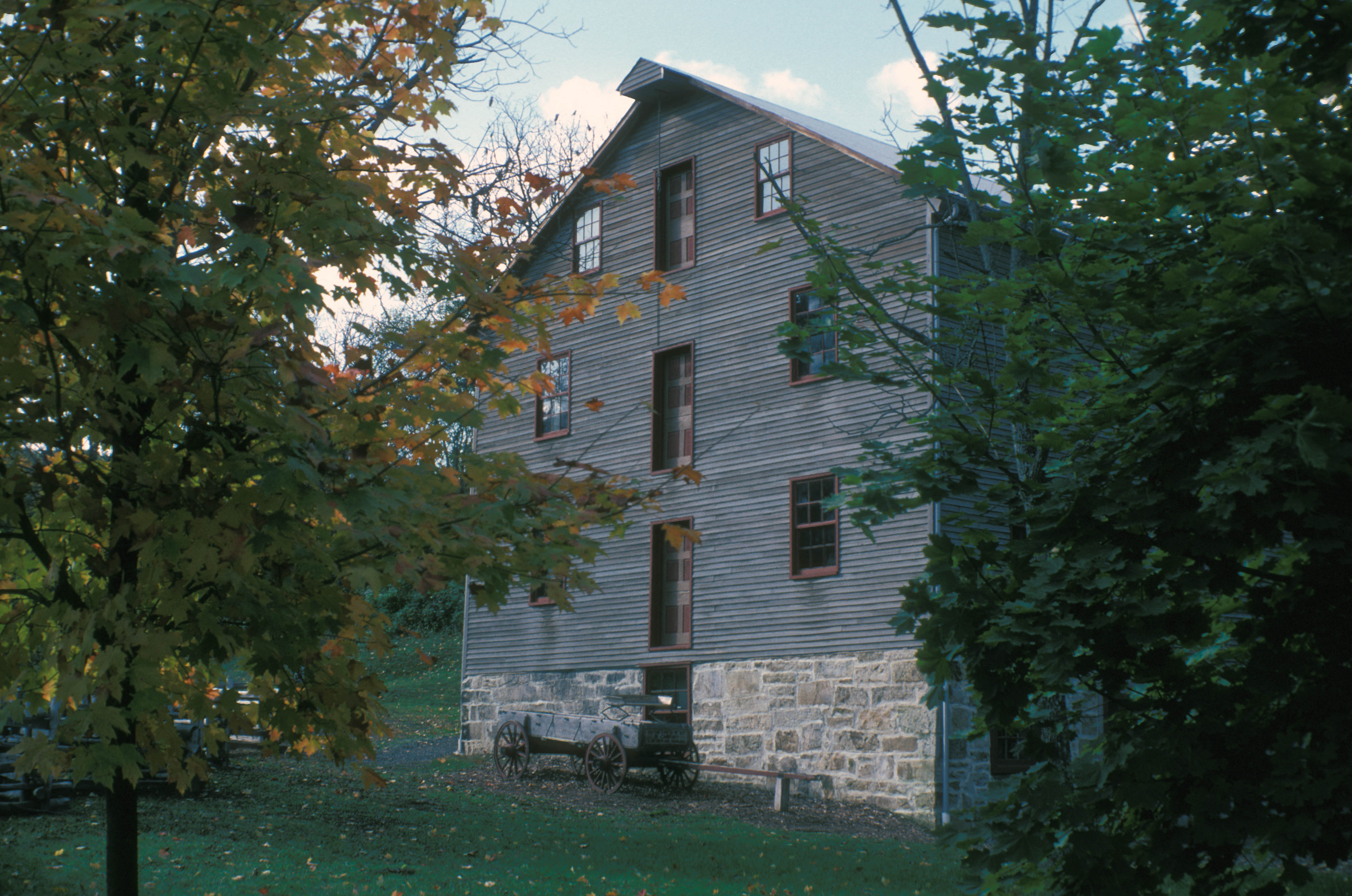

- Location within Pennsylvania Location within the United States
- Location: Southwest of Newport off Pennsylvania Route 34, Centre Township and Juniata Township, Pennsylvania
- Coordinates: 40°27′19″N 77°10′13″W
- Area: 45 acres (18 ha)
- Built: 1808
- Architect: Everhart, John; Et al.
- NRHP reference No.: 78002440
- Added to NRHP: April 03, 1978

The Little Buffalo Historic District, is a national historic district that is located in Centre Township and Juniata Township near Newport, Perry County, Pennsylvania, United States.

It was listed on the National Register of Historic Places in 1978.

== History and architectural features ==
This district encompasses a number of sites and structures which date from the iron-making era prior to 1850 when the settlement was known as Juniata Furnace. These include the remains of the iron furnace complex, Superintendent's House (1861), cemetery, first and second levels of the Blue Ball Tavern, covered bridge known as Wahneta's of Clay's Bridge, and the hiking trail that was once the bed of the Newport and Shermans Valley Railroad.
