= Bistline Covered Bridge =

- U.S. National Register of Historic Places
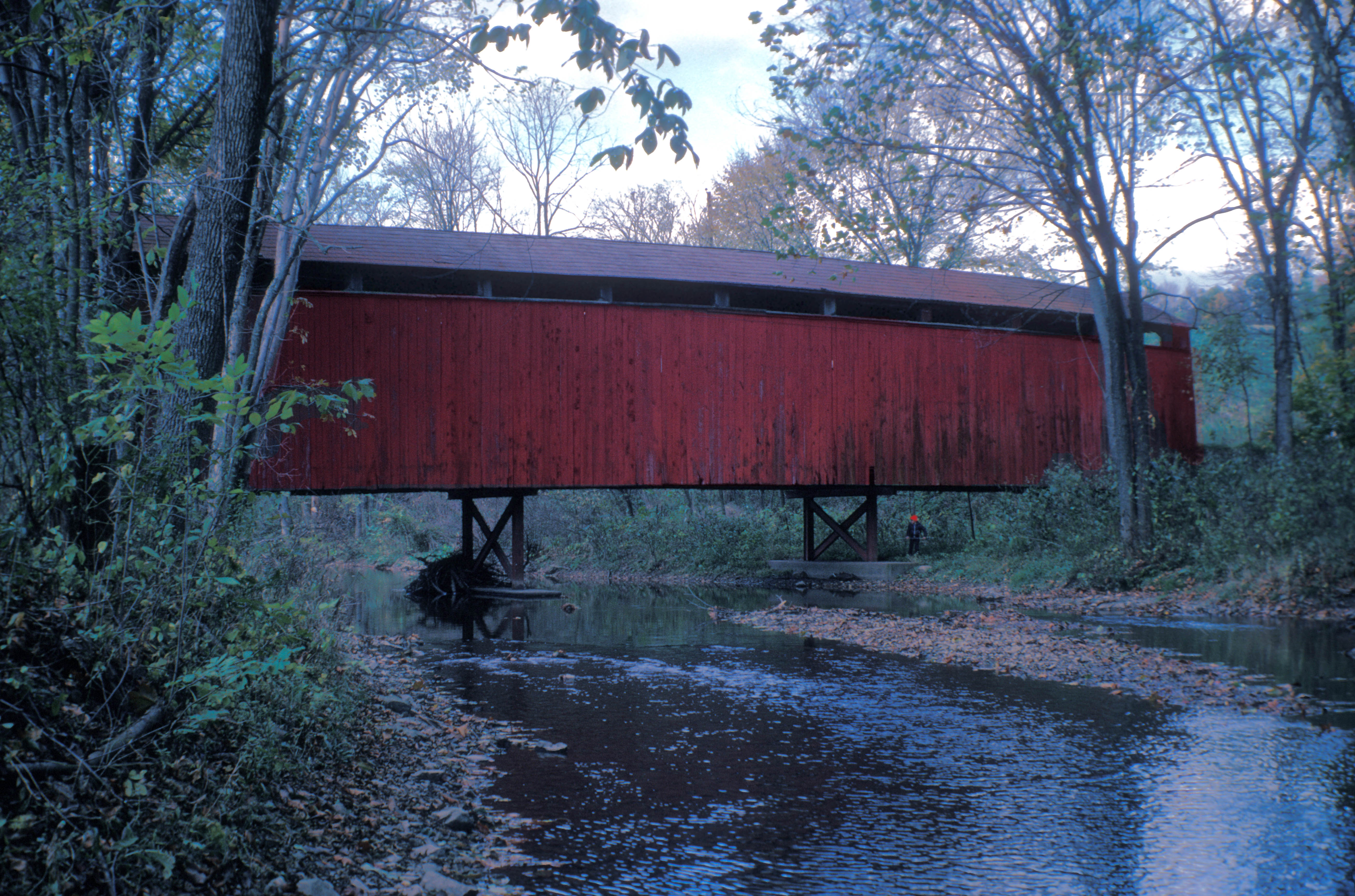

- Location within Pennsylvania Location within the United States
- Location: South of Andersonburg on Legislative Route 50008, Southwest Madison Township, Pennsylvania
- Coordinates: 40°20′2″N 77°28′14″W
- Area: 0.1 acres (0.040 ha)
- Built: 1871
- Architectural style: Burr
- MPS: Covered Bridges of Adams, Cumberland, and Perry Counties TR
- NRHP reference No.: 80003591
- Added to NRHP: August 25, 1980

The Bistline Covered Bridge, also known as Flickinger's Mill Covered Bridge, is a historic wooden covered bridge located at Southwest Madison Township near Blain in Perry County, Pennsylvania. It is a 96-foot-long (29 m) Burr Truss bridge, constructed about 1871. It crosses Shermans Creek.

It was listed on the National Register of Historic Places in 1980.
