= Tyrone Township, Perry County, Pennsylvania =

Township in Pennsylvania, US

Coordinates: 40°17′00″N 77°22′59″W

- Township
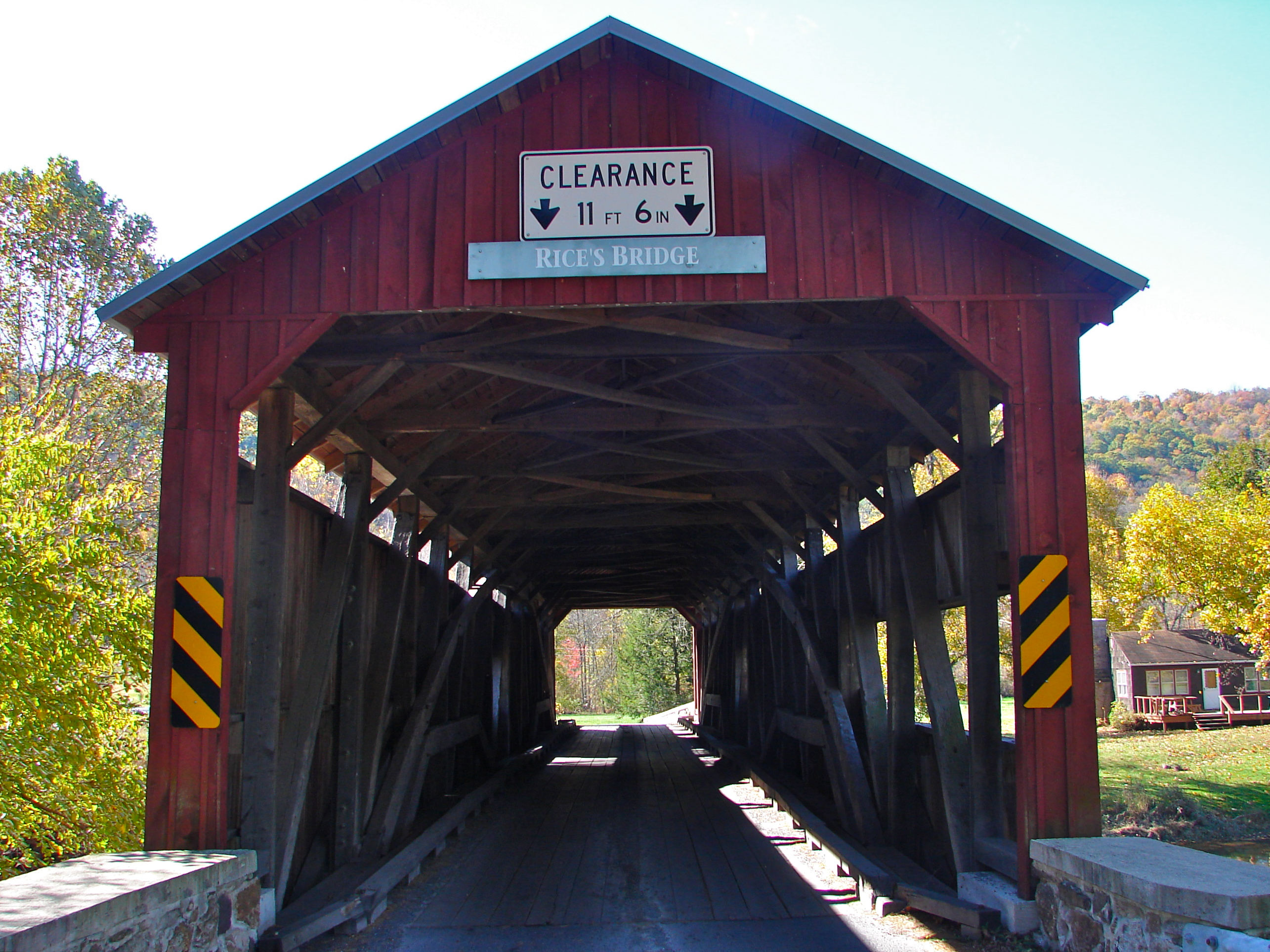
- Rice Covered Bridge

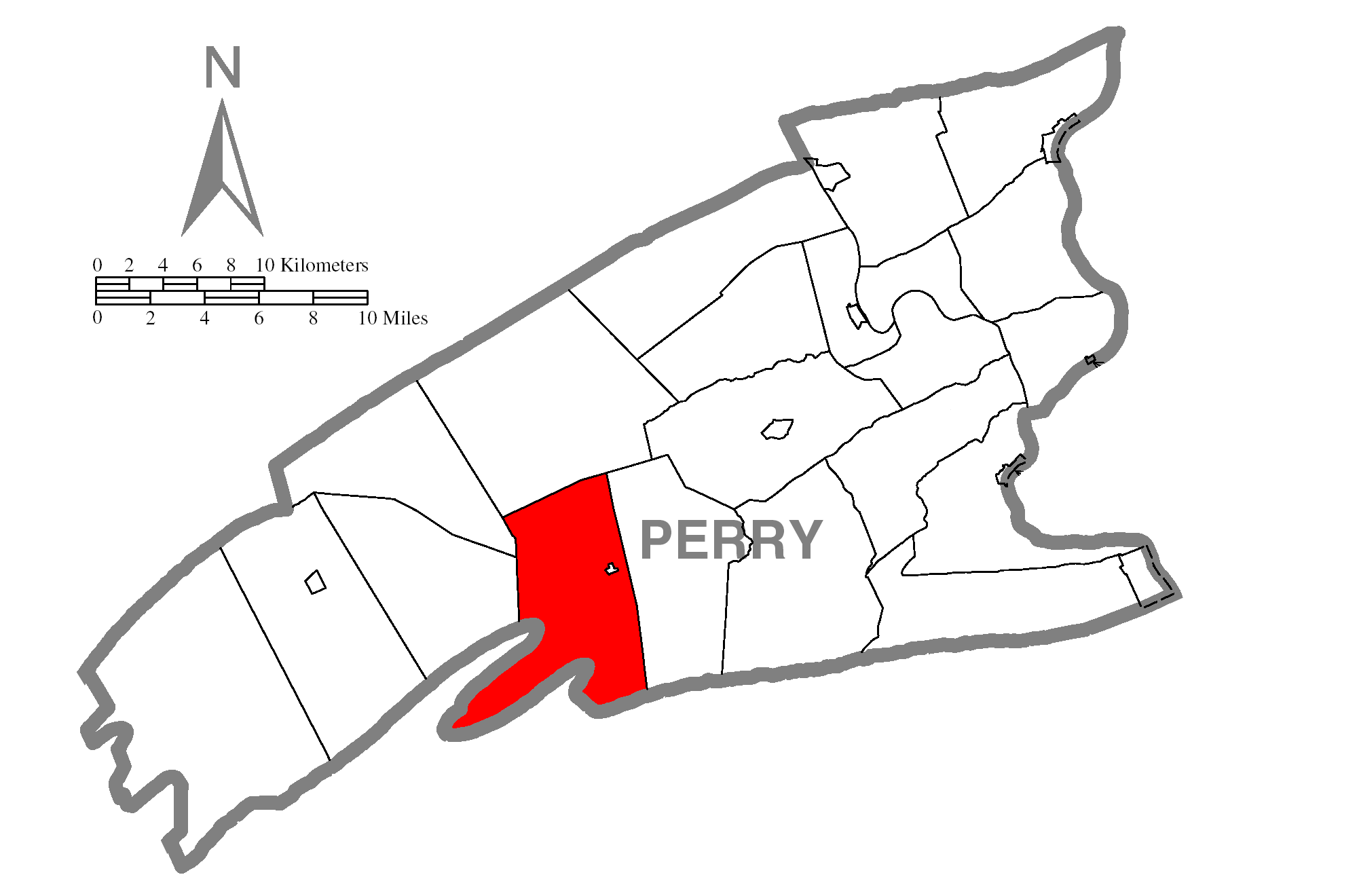
- Map of Perry County, Pennsylvania highlighting Tyrone Township

- Map of Perry County, Pennsylvania
- Country: United States
- State: Pennsylvania
- County: Perry
- Settled: 1755
- Incorporated: 1754

Area
  - Total: 35.88 sq mi (92.92 km^{2})
  - Land: 35.67 sq mi (92.38 km^{2})
  - Water: 0.21 sq mi (0.54 km^{2})

Population (2020)
  - Total: 1,919 ▼
  - Estimate (2023): 1,929
  - Density: 59.4/sq mi (22.95/km^{2})
- Time zone: UTC-5 (Eastern (EST))
  - Summer (DST): UTC-4 (EDT)
- Area code: 717
- FIPS code: 42-099-78184

Tyrone Township is a township in Perry County, Pennsylvania, United States. The population was 1,919 at the 2020 census. The principal communities in the township are the villages of Green Park and Loysville. The township surrounds the borough of Landisburg.

It was named after County Tyrone in Ireland.

== History ==
The Rice Covered Bridge was added to the National Register of Historic Places in 1980.

== Geography ==
According to the United States Census Bureau, the township has a total area of 35.8 square miles (92.6 km^{2}), of which 35.8 square miles (92.6 km^{2}) is land and 0.03% is water.

== Demographics ==
Historical population
Census	Pop.	Note	%±
2010	2,124		—
2020	1,919		−9.7%
2023 (est.)	1,929		0.5%
U.S. Decennial Census

As of the census of 2000, there were 1,863 people, 726 households, and 537 families residing in the township. The population density was 52.1 inhabitants per square mile (20.1/km^{2}). There were 835 housing units at an average density of 23.4/sq mi (9.0/km^{2}). The racial makeup of the township was 98.28% White, 0.43% African American, 0.11% Native American, 0.05% Pacific Islander, 0.16% from other races, and 0.97% from two or more races. Hispanic or Latino of any race were 0.91% of the population.

There were 726 households, out of which 31.5% had children under the age of 18 living with them, 62.3% were married couples living together, 6.9% had a female householder with no husband present, and 26.0% were non-families. 22.3% of all households were made up of individuals, and 12.0% had someone living alone who was 65 years of age or older. The average household size was 2.57 and the average family size was 2.97.

In the township the population was spread out, with 25.6% under the age of 18, 7.4% from 18 to 24, 27.9% from 25 to 44, 25.1% from 45 to 64, and 14.1% who were 65 years of age or older. The median age was 38 years. For every 100 females, there were 98.4 males. For every 100 females age 18 and over, there were 93.3 males.

The median income for a household in the township was $38,276, and the median income for a family was $43,750. Males had a median income of $31,475 versus $22,500 for females. The per capita income for the township was $17,202. About 6.5% of families and 9.0% of the population were below the poverty line, including 10.4% of those under age 18 and 7.8% of those age 65 or over.

== Government and infrastructure ==
The Loysville Youth Development Center, a juvenile detention center of the Pennsylvania Department of Human Services, is located in the township.
