= Adairs Covered Bridge =

Covered bridge in Pennsylvania, US

- U.S. National Register of Historic Places
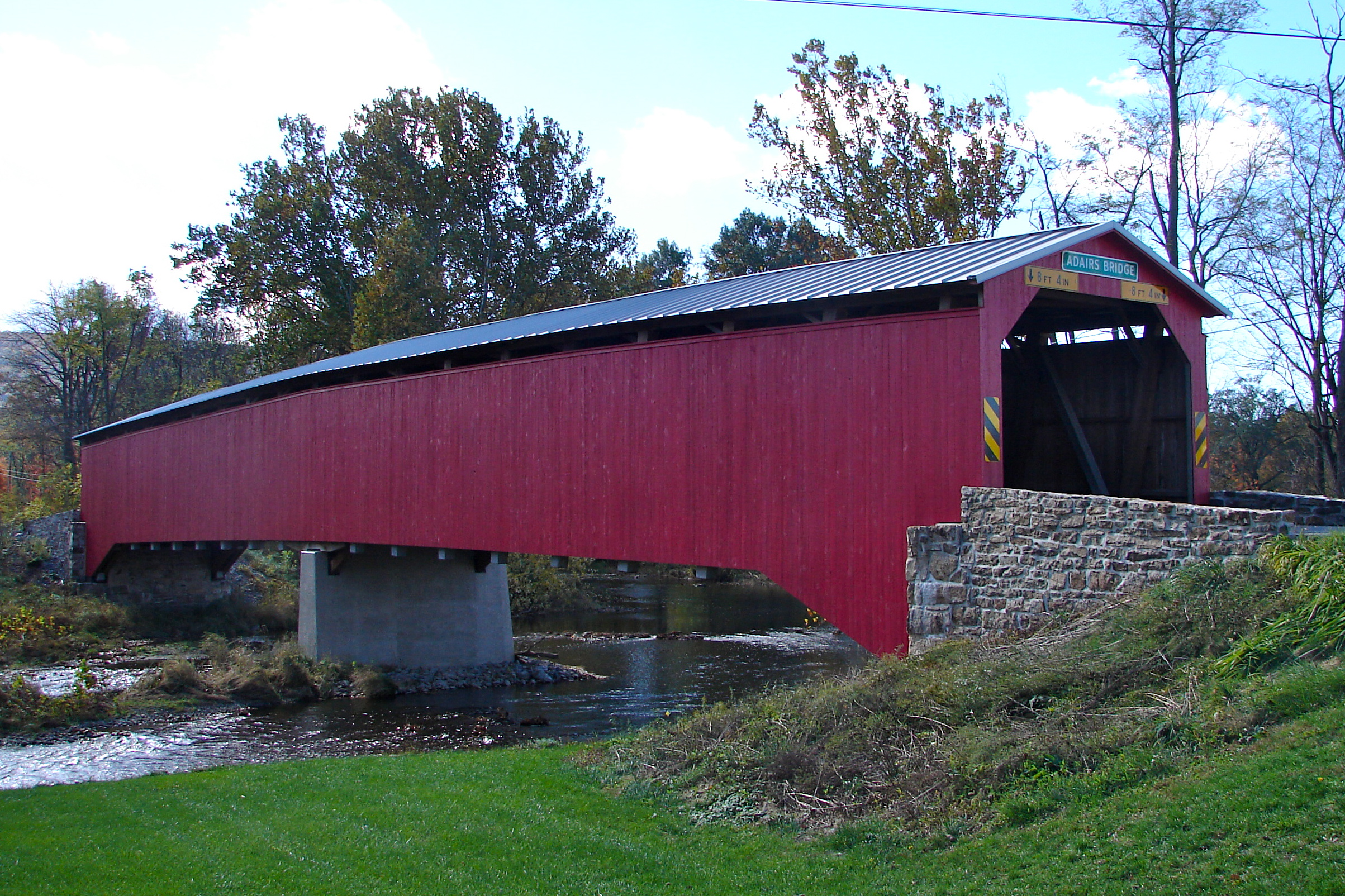
- Adairs Covered Bridge, October 2010

- Location within Pennsylvania Location within the United States
- Location: East of Andersonburg on Legislative Route 50009, Southwest Madison Township, Pennsylvania
- Coordinates: 40.35025°N 77.424189°W
- Area: 0.1 acres (0.040 ha)
- Built: 1864
- Architectural style: Burr
- MPS: Covered Bridges of Adams, Cumberland, and Perry Counties TR
- NRHP reference No.: 80003594
- Added to NRHP: August 25, 1980

The Adairs Covered Bridge, also known as Cisna Mill Covered Bridge, is a historic wooden covered bridge located at Southwest Madison Township near Blain in Perry County, Pennsylvania, United States. It is a 150-foot-long (46 m), Burr Truss bridge, constructed in 1864 and rebuilt in 1919. It crosses Shermans Creek.

It was listed on the National Register of Historic Places in 1980.

== Gallery ==
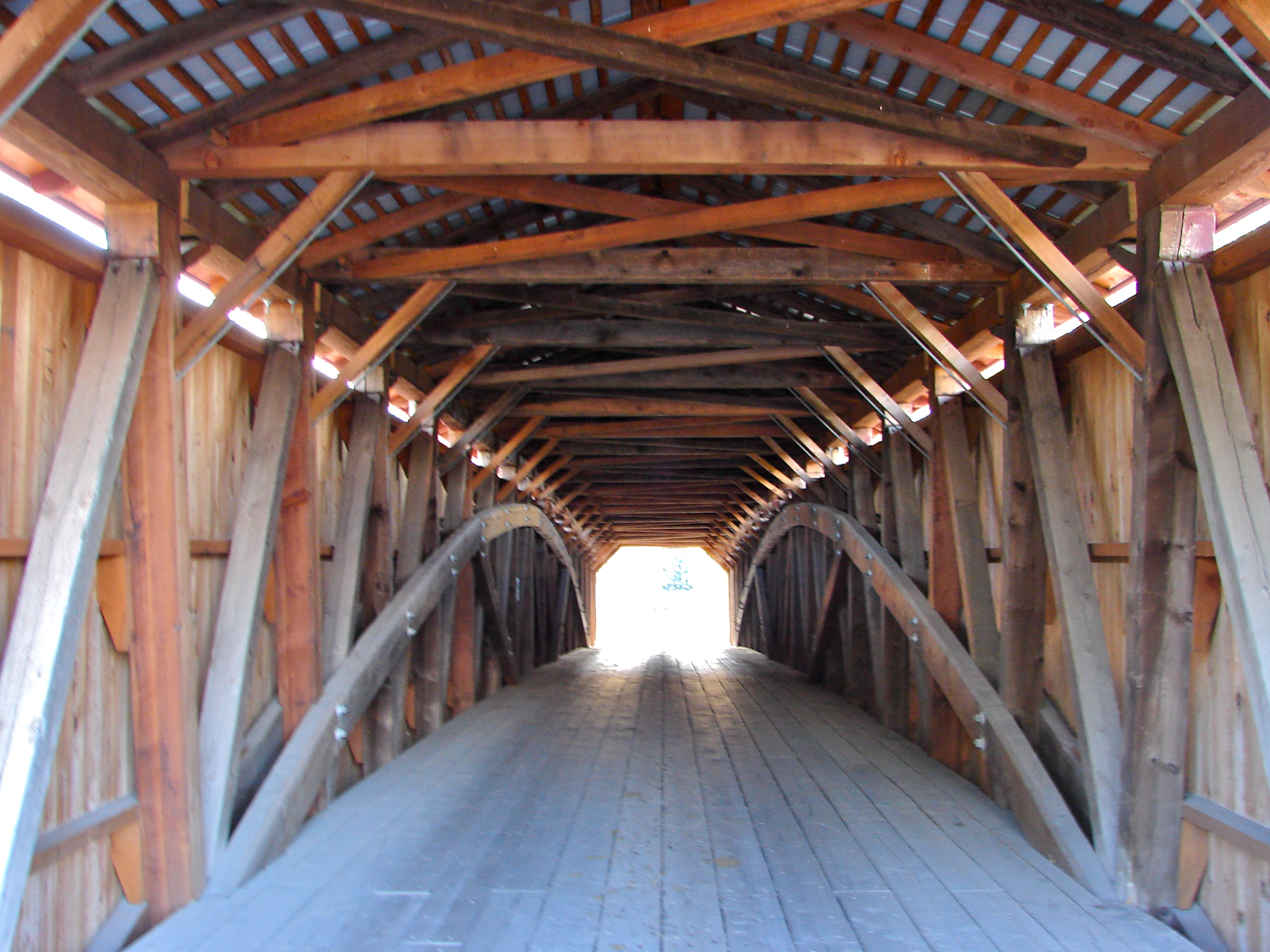
Interior of the bridge
