= Book's Covered Bridge =

Covered bridge in Pennsylvania, US

- U.S. National Register of Historic Places
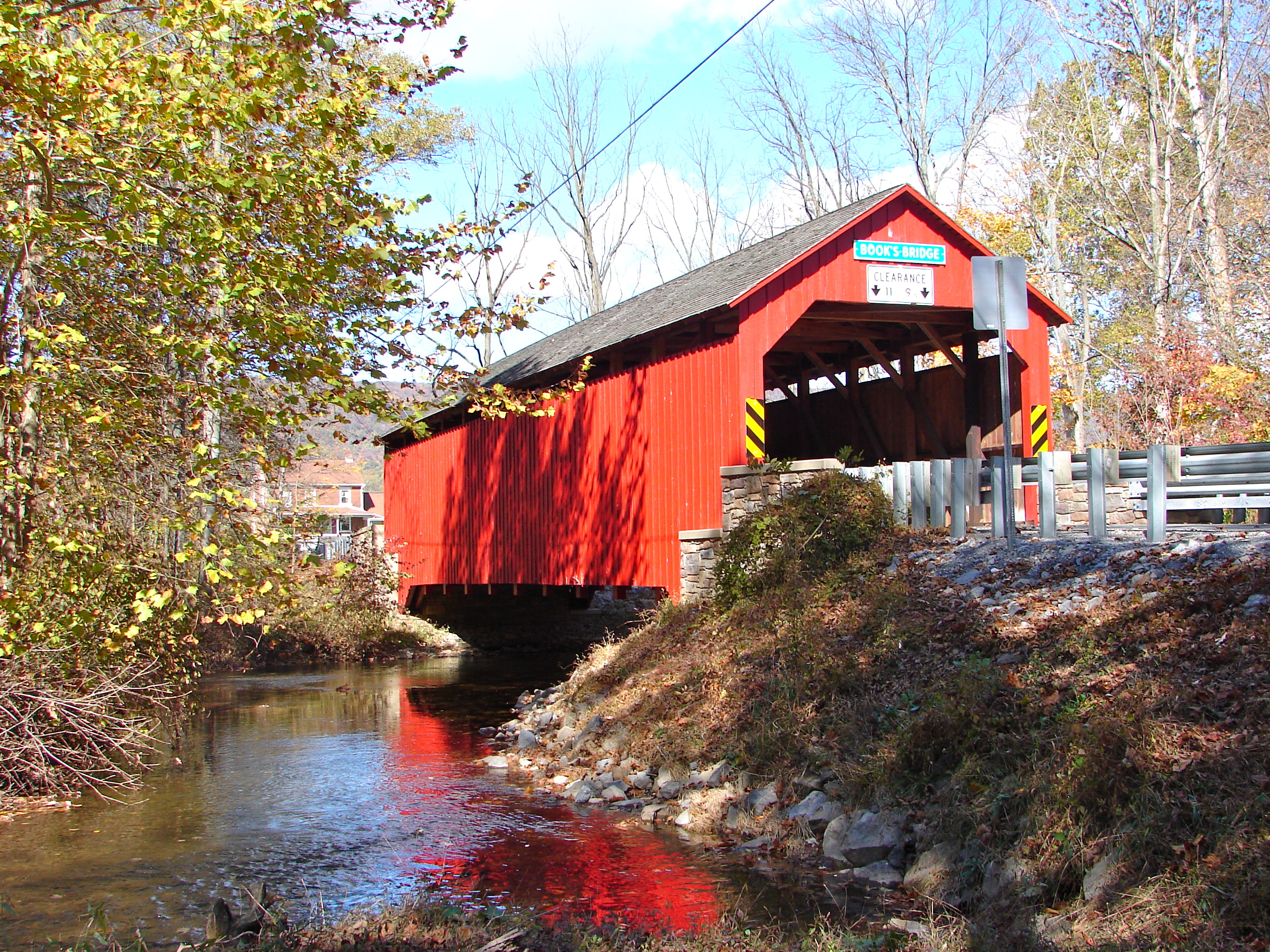
- Books Bridge, October 2010

- Location within Pennsylvania Location within the United States
- Location: Southwest of Blain on Legislative Route 50004, Jackson Township, Pennsylvania
- Coordinates: 40°19′28″N 77°31′29″W
- Area: 0.1 acres (0.040 ha)
- Built: 1884
- Architectural style: Burr
- MPS: Covered Bridges of Adams, Cumberland, and Perry Counties TR
- NRHP reference No.: 80003592
- Added to NRHP: August 25, 1980

The Book's Covered Bridge, also known as Kaufman Covered Bridge, is a historic wooden covered bridge located at Jackson Township near Blain in Perry County, Pennsylvania. It is a 70-foot-long (21 m) Burr Truss bridge, constructed in 1884. It crosses Shermans Creek.

It was listed on the National Register of Historic Places in 1980.
