= Mount Pleasant Covered Bridge =

- Mt. Pleasant Covered Bridge
- U.S. National Register of Historic Places
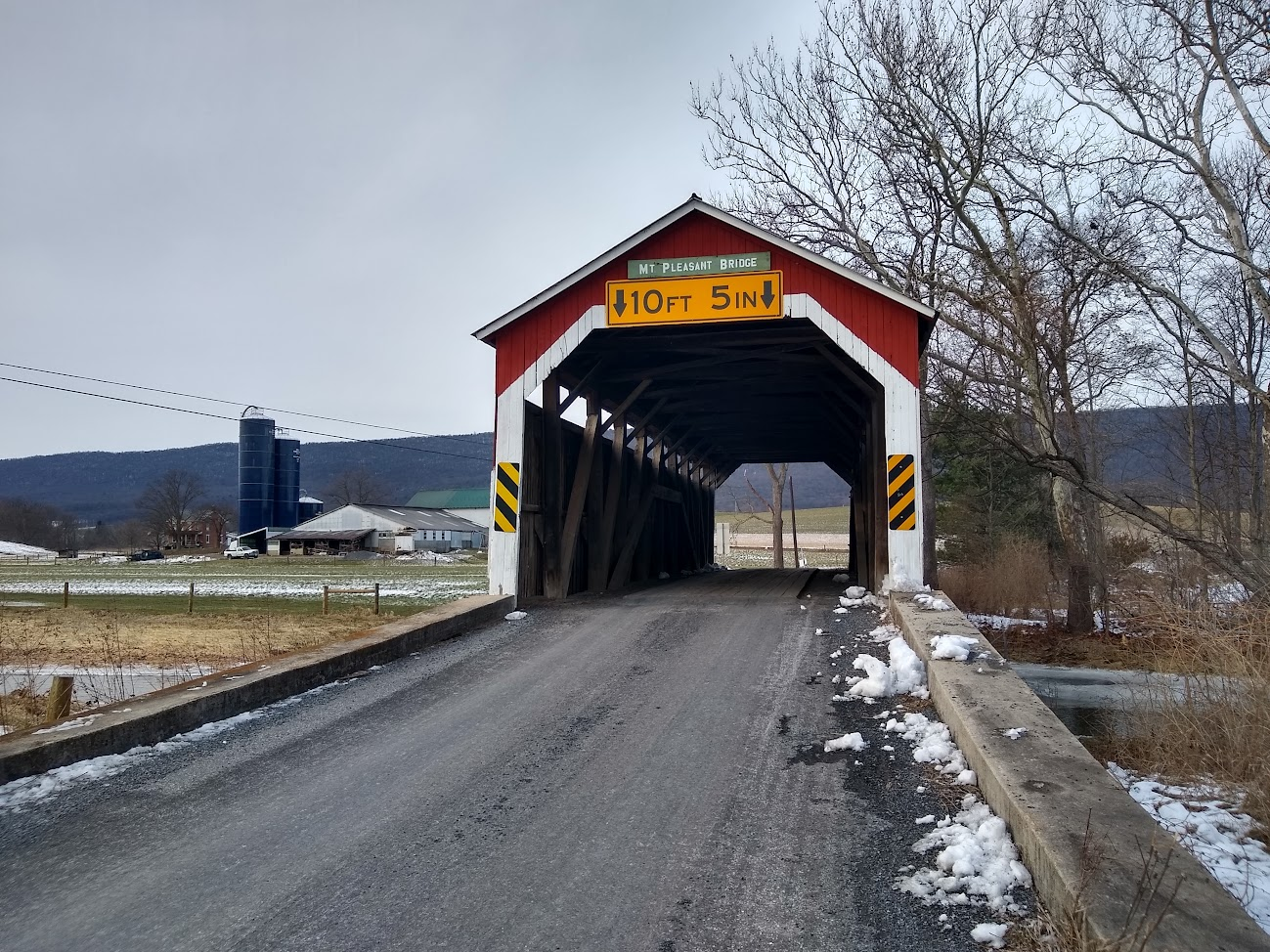

- Location within Pennsylvania Location within the United States
- Location: East of New Germantown on Township 304, Jackson Township, Pennsylvania
- Coordinates: 40°18′54″N 77°32′44″W
- Area: 0.1 acres (0.040 ha)
- Built: 1918
- Architect: L.M. Wentzel
- Architectural style: Queen M. King
- MPS: Covered Bridges of Adams, Cumberland, and Perry Counties TR
- NRHP reference No.: 80003599
- Added to NRHP: August 25, 1980

The Mt. Pleasant Covered Bridge is a historic wooden covered bridge located at Jackson Township near New Germantown in Perry County, Pennsylvania. It is a 60-foot-long (18 m) King post bridge, constructed in 1918. It crosses Shermans Creek.

It was listed on the National Register of Historic Places in 1980.
