= Juniata Township, Perry County, Pennsylvania =

Township in Pennsylvania, US

Coordinates: 40°31′00″N 77°10′59″W

- Township
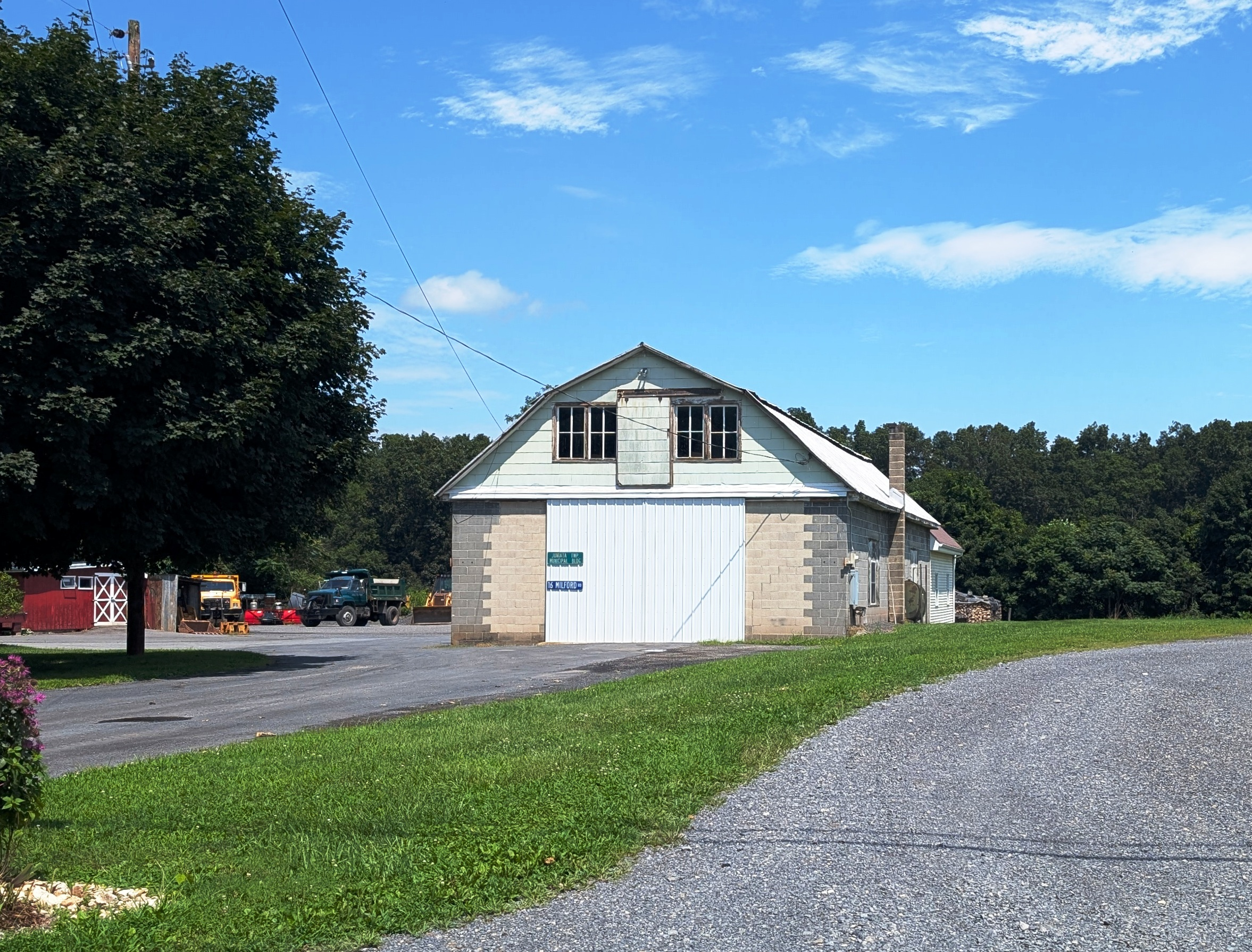
- Municipal Building

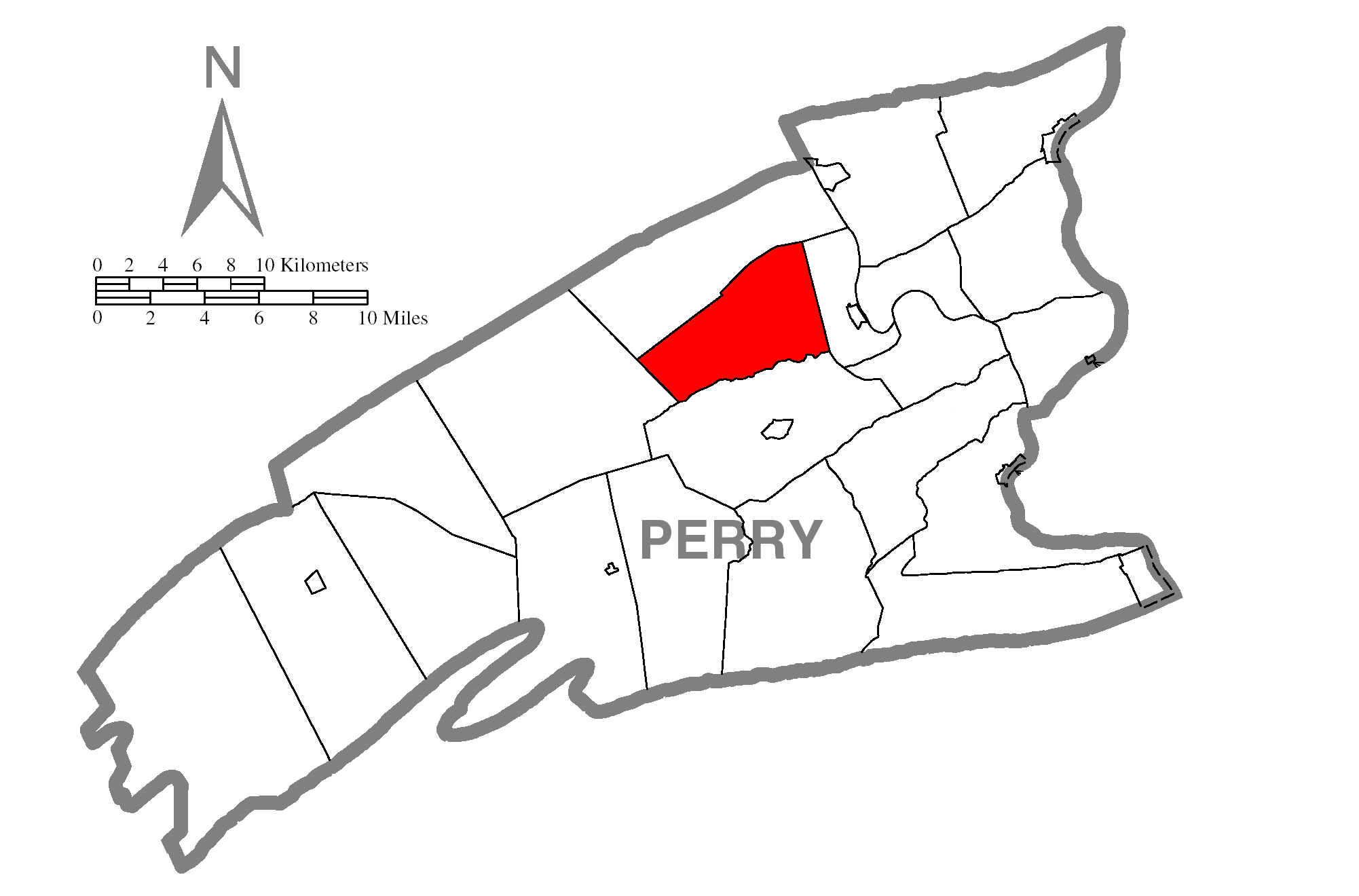
- Map of Perry County, Pennsylvania highlighting Juniata Township

- Map of Perry County, Pennsylvania
- Country: United States
- State: Pennsylvania
- County: Perry
- Settled: 1760
- Incorporated: 1793

Area
  - Total: 21.11 sq mi (54.67 km^{2})
  - Land: 20.88 sq mi (54.07 km^{2})
  - Water: 0.23 sq mi (0.60 km^{2})

Population (2020)
  - Total: 1,530 ▲
  - Estimate (2023): 1,540
  - Density: 68/sq mi (26.1/km^{2})
- Time zone: UTC-5 (Eastern (EST))
  - Summer (DST): UTC-4 (EDT)
- Area code: 717
- FIPS code: 42-099-38616

Juniata Township is a township in Perry County, Pennsylvania, United States. As of the 2020 census, the township population was 1,530.

== Communities ==
The township includes the following cities, towns, villages, hamlets and other organized settlements.

- Markelsville

== History ==
The Little Buffalo Historic District was added to the National Register of Historic Places in 1978.

== Geography ==
According to the United States Census Bureau, the township has a total area of 21.0 square miles (54 km^{2}), of which 21.0 square miles (54 km^{2}) is land and 0.1 square miles (0.26 km^{2}) (0.38%) is water.

== Demographics ==
Historical population
Census	Pop.	Note	%±
2010	1,412		—
2020	1,530		8.4%
2023 (est.)	1,540		0.7%
U.S. Decennial Census

As of the census of 2000, there were 1,359 people, 495 households, and 411 families residing in the township. The population density was 64.8 inhabitants per square mile (25.0/km^{2}). There were 538 housing units at an average density of 25.7/sq mi (9.9/km^{2}). The racial makeup of the township was 98.90% White, 0.07% Native American, 0.74% from other races, and 0.29% from two or more races. Hispanic or Latino of any race were 0.96% of the population.

There were 495 households, out of which 31.5% had children under the age of 18 living with them, 73.7% were married couples living together, 5.5% had a female householder with no husband present, and 16.8% were non-families. 13.3% of all households were made up of individuals, and 5.7% had someone living alone who was 65 years of age or older. The average household size was 2.75 and the average family size was 3.01.

In the township the population was spread out, with 24.7% under the age of 18, 5.7% from 18 to 24, 30.8% from 25 to 44, 27.4% from 45 to 64, and 11.5% who were 65 years of age or older. The median age was 39 years. For every 100 females, there were 100.1 males. For every 100 females age 18 and over, there were 100.6 males.

The median income for a household in the township was $47,174, and the median income for a family was $48,967. Males had a median income of $30,925 versus $24,306 for females. The per capita income for the township was $18,859. About 3.6% of families and 5.5% of the population were below the poverty line, including 7.9% of those under age 18 and 4.5% of those age 65 or over.
