= Landisburg, Pennsylvania =

Borough in Pennsylvania, US

- Borough
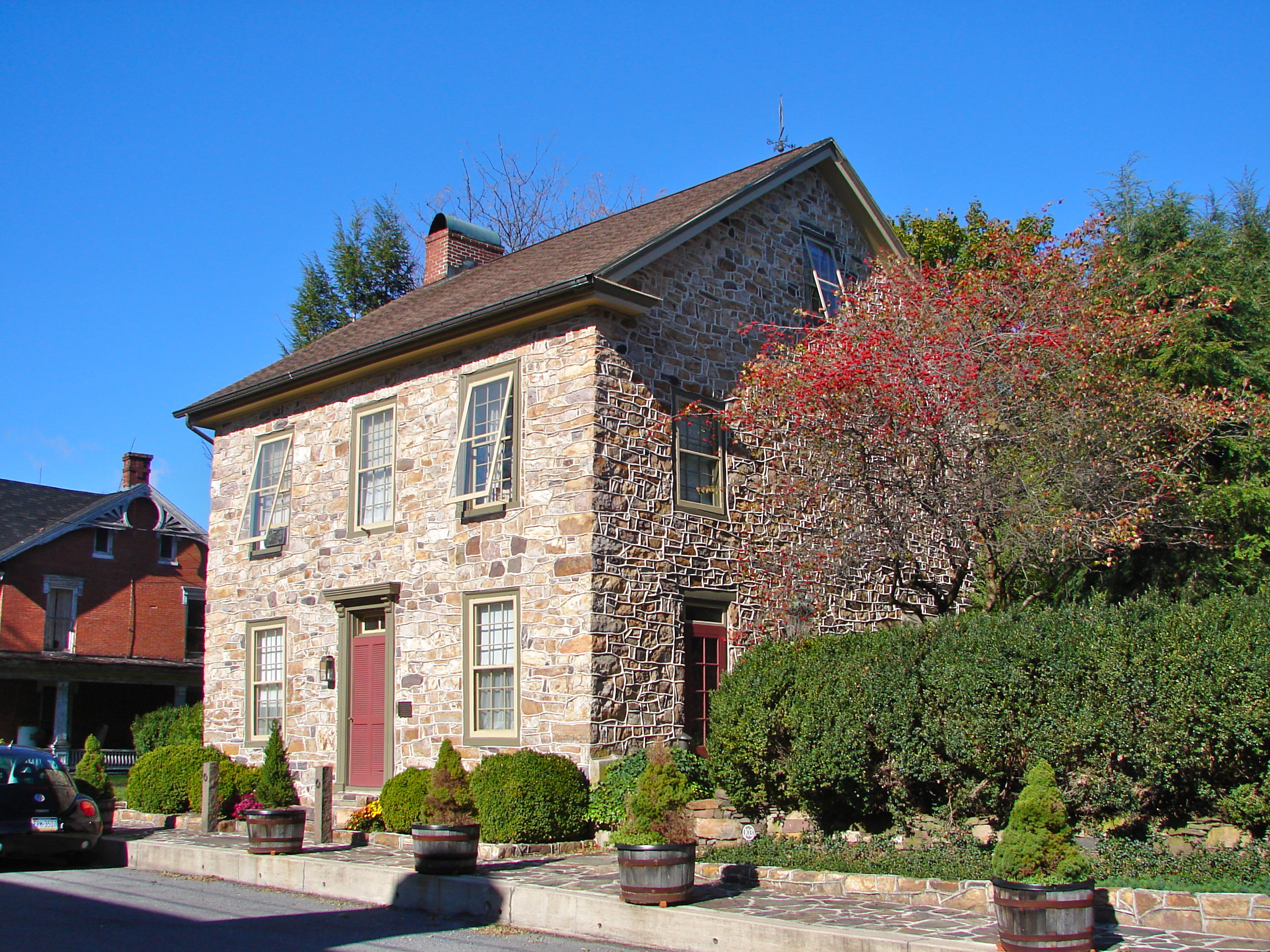
- Dunbar-Creigh House

- Location of Landisburg in Perry County, Pennsylvania.

- Location within Pennsylvania Location within the United States
- Coordinates: 40°20′32″N 77°18′25″W
- Country: United States
- State: Pennsylvania
- County: Perry
- Settled: 1793
- Incorporated: 1831

Area
  - Total: 0.073 sq mi (0.19 km^{2})
  - Land: 0.073 sq mi (0.19 km^{2})
  - Water: 0 sq mi (0.00 km^{2})
- Elevation (center of borough): 550 ft (170 m)
- Highest elevation (northern boundary): 640 ft (200 m)
- Lowest elevation (tributary to Montour Creek on southern boundary): 480 ft (150 m)

Population (2020)
  - Total: 221
  - Density: 3,091.1/sq mi (1,193.48/km^{2})
- Time zone: UTC-5 (Eastern (EST))
  - Summer (DST): UTC-4 (EDT)
- ZIP Code: 17040
- Area code: 717
- FIPS code: 42-41272

Landisburg is a borough in Perry County, Pennsylvania, United States. As of the 2020 census, Landisburg had a population of 221. It is part of the Harrisburg–Carlisle Metropolitan Statistical Area.

== History ==
Landisburg was platted in 1793. The community was named for its founder, James Landis.

The Dunbar-Creigh House was added to the National Register of Historic Places in 1980.

== Geography ==
Landisburg is located at 40°20′32″N 77°18′25″W (40.342339, -77.307038).

According to the United States Census Bureau, the borough has a total area of 0.1 square miles (0.26 km^{2}), all land.

== Demographics ==
Historical population
Census	Pop.	Note	%±
1850	416		—
1860	363		−12.7%
1870	369		1.7%
1880	336		−8.9%
1890	318		−5.4%
1900	300		−5.7%
1910	252		−16.0%
1920	185		−26.6%
1930	236		27.6%
1940	266		12.7%
1950	279		4.9%
1960	285		2.2%
1970	269		−5.6%
1980	227		−15.6%
1990	178		−21.6%
2000	195		9.6%
2010	218		11.8%
2020	221		1.4%
2021 (est.)	222	▲	0.5%

As of the census of 2000, there were 195 people, 78 households, and 59 families residing in the borough. The population density was 1,991.9 inhabitants per square mile (769.1/km^{2}). There were 89 housing units at an average density of 909.1 per square mile (351.0/km^{2}). The racial makeup of the borough was 97.95% White, 0.51% Native American, 0.51% Asian, 1.03% from other races. Hispanic or Latino of any race were 1.03% of the population.

There were 78 households, out of which 34.6% had children under the age of 18 living with them, 61.5% were married couples living together, 9.0% had a female householder with no husband present, and 23.1% were non-families. 19.2% of all households were made up of individuals, and 12.8% had someone living alone who was 65 years of age or older. The average household size was 2.50 and the average family size was 2.90.

In the borough the population was spread out, with 25.6% under the age of 18, 7.2% from 18 to 24, 29.7% from 25 to 44, 20.5% from 45 to 64, and 16.9% who were 65 years of age or older. The median age was 36 years. For every 100 females, there were 99.0 males. For every 100 females age 18 and over, there were 104.2 males.

The median income for a household in the borough was $31,563, and the median income for a family was $36,750. Males had a median income of $31,786 versus $22,500 for females. The per capita income for the borough was $15,379. About 6.8% of families and 9.4% of the population were below the poverty line, including 17.1% of those under the age of eighteen and 18.2% of those 65 or over.

== Notable people ==
- John F. Beard, Wisconsin legislator, farmer and plasterer, was born in Landisburg
- Mark Keller, Pennsylvania legislator, lives in Landisburg
- John Alexander Magee, Pennsylvania newspaperman, printer and congressman; born in Landisburg
- Jesse Miller, Pennsylvania sheriff, legislator and congressman, born near Landisburg
- William Henry Miller, Pennsylvania congressman, lawyer and journalist; son of Jesse; born in Landisburg
