= Pennsylvania House of Representatives, District 82 =

American legislative district

Pennsylvania's 82nd State House of Representatives district
Representative
Paul Takac; D–Lemont
- Population (2022): 62,294

The 82nd Pennsylvania House of Representatives District is located in central Pennsylvania and has been represented by Paul Takac since 2023.

== District profile ==
The 82nd District is located in Centre County and includes the following areas:

- Benner Township
- Boggs Township
- Burnside Township
- College Township
- Curtin Township
- Harris Township
- Howard
- Howard Township
- Liberty Township
- Marion Township
- Milesburg
- Snow Shoe
- Snow Shoe Township
- State College (part)
  - District East
  - District East Central (part)
    - Division 03
  - District North
  - District Northeast
  - District Penn State Univ. (hub)
  - District South (part)
    - Division 02
  - District South Central
  - District Southeast
- Union Township
- Unionville

== Representatives ==
Representative	Party	Years	District home	Note
Prior to 1969, seats were apportioned by county.
W. Brady Hetrick	Democrat	1969 – 1972		
Walter F. DeVerter	Republican	1973 – 1988		
Daniel F. Clark	Republican	1989 – 2002		
Adam Harris	Republican	2003 – 2018	Mifflintown	
John D. Hershey	Republican	2019 – 2023		Redistricted to 86th District; lost to Perry A. Stambaugh in primary
Paul Takac	Democrat	2023 – present		Incumbent

== Recent election results ==
PA House election, 2024: Pennsylvania House, District 82
Party	Candidate	Votes	%
Democratic	Paul Takac, Jr. (incumbent)	16,558	53.80
Republican	Therese Hollen	14,221	46.20
Total votes		30,779	100.00
Democratic hold			

PA House election, 2022: Pennsylvania House, District 82
Party	Candidate	Votes	%
Democratic	Paul Takac, Jr.	12,739	56.34
Republican	Justin Behrens	9,870	43.66
Total votes		22,609	100.00
Democratic gain from Republican			

PA House election, 2020: Pennsylvania House, District 82
Party	Candidate	Votes	%
Republican	John D. Hershey (incumbent)	Unopposed	
Total votes		26,822	100.00
Republican hold			

PA House election, 2018: Pennsylvania House, District 82
Party	Candidate	Votes	%
Republican	John D. Hershey	15,406	82.54
Independent	Elizabeth Book	3,258	17.46
Total votes		18,664	100.00
Republican hold			

PA House election, 2016: Pennsylvania House, District 82
Party	Candidate	Votes	%
Republican	Adam Harris (incumbent)	Unopposed	
Total votes		21,861	100.00
Republican hold			

PA House election, 2014: Pennsylvania House, District 82
Party	Candidate	Votes	%
Republican	Adam Harris (incumbent)	Unopposed	
Total votes		12,888	100.00
Republican hold			

PA House election, 2012: Pennsylvania House, District 82
Party	Candidate	Votes	%
Republican	Adam Harris (incumbent)	Unopposed	
Total votes		18,925	100.00
Republican hold			

PA House election, 2010: Pennsylvania House, District 82
Party	Candidate	Votes	%
Republican	Adam Harris (incumbent)	Unopposed	
Total votes		15,397	100.00
Republican hold			
