= West Perry School District =

School district in Pennsylvania

Coordinates: 40.38107°N 77.33139°W

West Perry Area School District
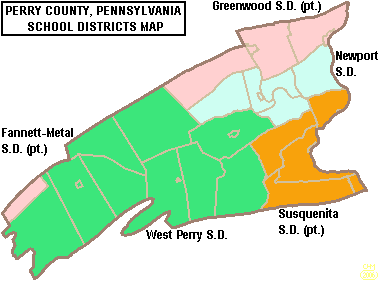

Address
- 2606 Shermans Valley Road Elliottsburg, Perry County, Pennsylvania, 17024-9706; United States

District information
- Type: Public

Students and staff
- District mascot: Mustang
- Colors: Green and white

Other information
- Website: www.westperry.org

The West Perry School District is a midsized, public school district located in western Perry County, Pennsylvania. It encompasses over 325 square miles (840 km^{2}), covering virtually all of the western half of the county. As one of Perry County's four school districts, West Perry serves: the boroughs of Blain, New Bloomfield and Landisburg, as well as Carroll Township, Centre Township, Jackson Township, Northeast Madison Township, Saville Township, Spring Township, Southwest Madison Township, Toboyne Township, and Tyrone Township, making it the largest school district in terms of area in Perry County. According to 2008 local census data, West Perry School District had a resident population of 17,101 people. According to the US Census Bureau, by 2010, the district's population had grown to 19,005 people. In 2010, the educational attainment levels, for the population 25 and over, was 83.3% high school graduates and 14.5% college graduates.

Per the Pennsylvania Budget and Policy Center, 36.7% of the district's pupils lived at 185% or below the Federal Poverty level as shown by their eligibility for the federal free or reduced price school meal programs in 2012. In 2013 the Pennsylvania Department of Education, reported that 25 students in the West Perry School District were homeless. In 2009, the district residents' per capita income was $17,802, while the median family income was $47,210 a year. In Perry County, the median household income was $57,375. In the Commonwealth, the median family income was $49,501 and the United States median family income was $49,445, in 2010. In 2014, the median household income in the USA was $53,700.

West Perry School District operates three elementary schools (K-5th):

- Blain Elementary School (proposed for permanent closure in 2026),
- Carroll Elementary School,
- New Bloomfield Elementary School
- West Perry Middle School (6th −8th)
- West Perry High School (9th–12th)

Additionally, the district operates Hidden Valley School which is a full-time emotional support facility for students who benefit from an alternate educational setting. Hidden Valley students are in grades 6–12 from the West Perry School District, along with students from other districts in Perry County.

West Perry High School students may choose to attend Cumberland Perry Area Vocational Technical School which is located in Mechanicsburg, Pennsylvania. CPAVTA provides training in the: construction and mechanical trades, culinary arts, health aids, computer technical careers and other fields. Students may also attend Capital Area Online Learning Association (CAOLA) online education programs. The service is operated by the CAIU15. The Capital Area Intermediate Unit IU15 also provides West Perry School District with a wide variety of services, like: specialized education for disabled students; hearing, speech and visual disability services and professional development for staff and faculty.

== History ==
On July 1, 1964, three Perry County school systems (Green Park Union, Perry Joint, and Blain Union) consolidated into the West Perry School District. West Perry High School, located in Green Park, Pennsylvania, had served as Green Park Union High School. Green and white were selected as West Perry's colors because at the time of the consolidation, Green Park Union (whose colors were green and white) had just purchased new band uniforms and the district did not want to replace them. The current West Perry Middle School opened in 1967 as Green Park Elementary; a transfer of functions with the old middle school (now New Bloomfield Elementary) took place with the 2001–2002 academic year.

== Extracurriculars ==
West Perry School District schools offer a wide variety of clubs, activities and an extensive sports program. Eligibility for participation is determined by school board policies.

=== Athletics ===
West Perry's 1989 football team was the last undefeated team in Pennsylvania not to make the state playoffs, a distinction that the school may hold forever since the playoff format has been massively expanded since. Ten years later the football team, led by future University of Georgia and Baltimore Ravens running back Musa Smith, became the first squad in school history to make the post-season. The team faced the Central York Panthers in the first round of the playoffs, winning by a score of 42–0, making the Panthers the eighth team that season the Mustangs had forced the "mercy rule" upon. In the second game, the district finals, the Mustangs faced the Manheim Central Barons (winners of the 10 previous District 3 AAA championships) and were not so fortunate, losing 28–21 with the game ending as West Perry reached the opponent's 1-yard line.

The West Perry baseball team won consecutive state AA titles in 1979 and 1980. The West Perry boys basketball team reached the state AAA semi-finals in 2006. The West Perry Field Hockey team captured the 2024 PIAA Class 1A state championship.

The district funds:

Boys

- Baseball - AAA
- Basketball- AAA
- Cross Country - AA
- Football - AAA
- Soccer - AA
- Track and Field - AAA
- Wrestling - AAA

Girls

- Basketball - AAA
- Cheer - AAAA (added 2014)
- Cross Country - AA
- Field Hockey - AA
- Soccer (Fall) - AA
- Softball - AAA
- Track and Field - AAA
- Volleyball - AA

Middle School Sports

Boys

- Basketball
- Football
- Soccer
- Track and Field
- Wrestling

Girls

- Basketball
- Field Hockey
- Soccer (Fall)
- Track and Field
- Volleyball

According to PIAA directory July 2014 The Schools are in PIAA District 3.
