= John D. Hershey =

American politician

John Hershey

Member of the Pennsylvania House of Representatives from the 82nd district
- In office December 1, 2018 – January 3, 2023
- Preceded by: Adam Harris
- Succeeded by: Paul Takac (Redistricting)

Personal details
- Born: Johnathan Hershey Mifflintown, Pennsylvania, U.S.
- Party: Republican
- Education: Messiah University (BA)

Johnathan D. Hershey is an American politician who served as a member of the Pennsylvania House of Representatives from the 82nd district. First elected in November 2018, he assumed office on December 1, 2018. In 2022, Hershey was redistricted into the 86th district, where he then lost in the primary to Perry Stambaugh.

== Early life and education ==
Born in Mifflintown, Pennsylvania, Hershey graduated from Juniata High School in 2011. He earned a Bachelor of Arts degree in economics and international relations from Messiah University in 2015.

== Career ==
Hershey began his career working for a non-profit organization in East Africa. He later served in the office of Congressman Charlie Dent. He was elected to the Pennsylvania House of Representatives in November 2018 and assumed office on December 1, 2018. He was defeated by Perry Stambaugh in the 2022 primary elections after being redistricted into the 86th district.

Hershey served on the Agriculture & Rural Affairs, Appropriations, Government Oversight, Health, and Judiciary committees during his tenure.
