= Allan Holman =

American politician

Allan W. Holman, Jr.

Member of the Pennsylvania House of Representatives from the 86th district
- In office 1969–1970
- Preceded by: District created
- Succeeded by: William J. Moore

Member of the Pennsylvania House of Representatives from the Perry County district
- In office 1961–1968

Personal details
- Born: July 28, 1929 Hazleton, Pennsylvania
- Died: September 6, 2010 (aged 81) New Bloomfield, Pennsylvania
- Party: Republican
- Spouse: Joan Robinson Holman
- Children: Andrew Holman, Robin Loy, Anne Hastie
- Education: Gettysburg College, Dickinson Law School
- Occupation: lawyer

Allan W. Holman, Jr. (July 28, 1929 – September 6, 2010) is a former Republican member of the Pennsylvania House of Representatives. He was born in Hazleton, Pennsylvania, in 1929. He married Joan Robinson and raised a family of three children, Andrew, Robin, and Anne. He later had eight grandchildren, Jenn, Sarah, Rachael, Robbie, Sam, Andy, Elliott, and Julian. After serving as a state Representative, he continued his career as a lawyer, and began the Law Offices of Holman and Holman with daughter Robin. He also created plans for Little Buffalo State Park; thus the park lake was named "Holman Lake" in his honor. Though referred to as "Holman's Mudhole" in the beginning, the park became a beautiful spot for hikers, swimmers, boaters, and fishing enthusiasts. Throughout his life, Holman also donated money to various charities. He volunteered with the Boy Scouts, and served as a member of many organizations throughout Perry County. He also spent a lot of time watching sports, Penn State being his favorite team.
