= Monument, Pennsylvania =

Unincorporated community in Pennsylvania, US

- Census designated place
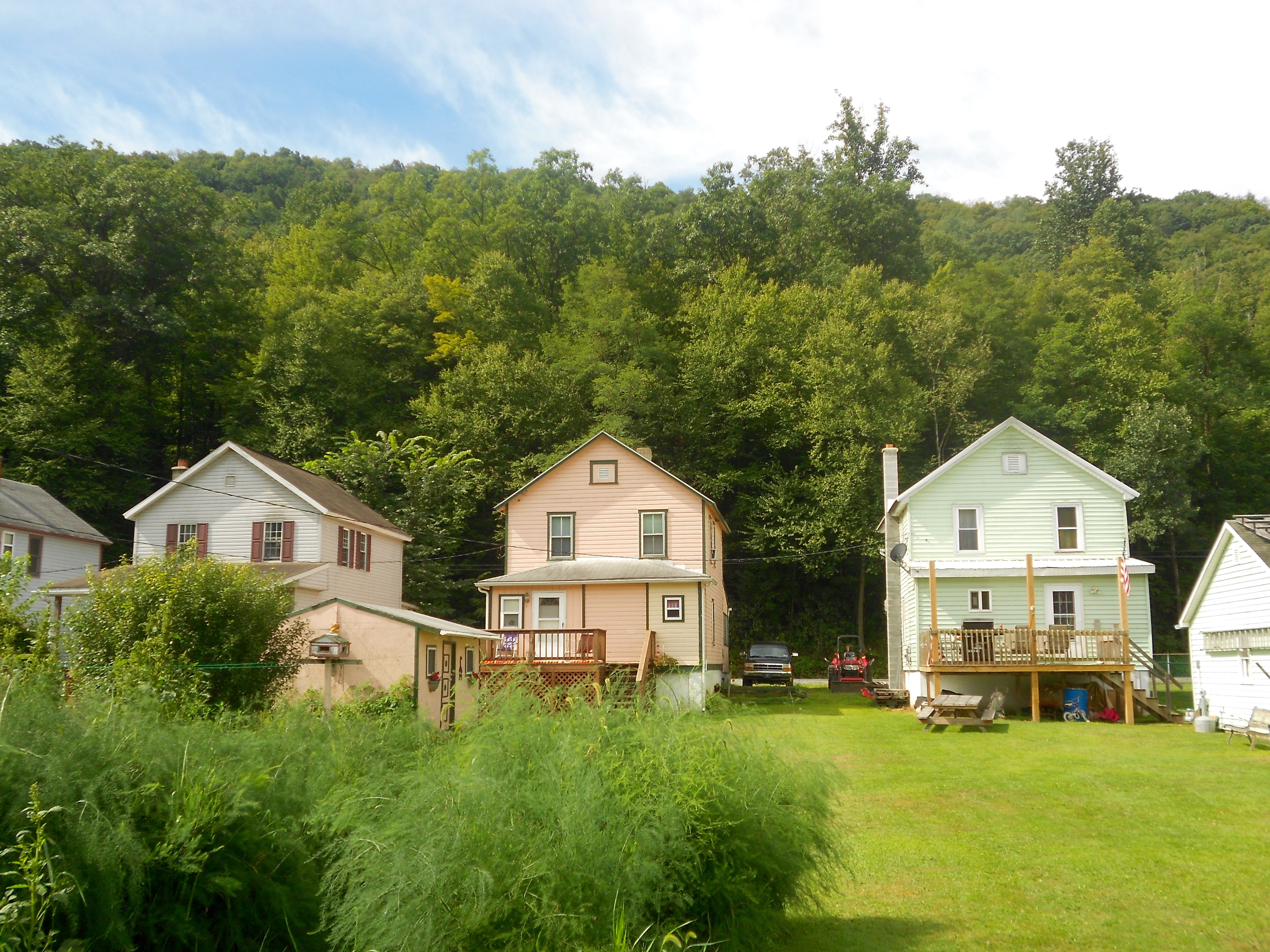
- Houses in Monument

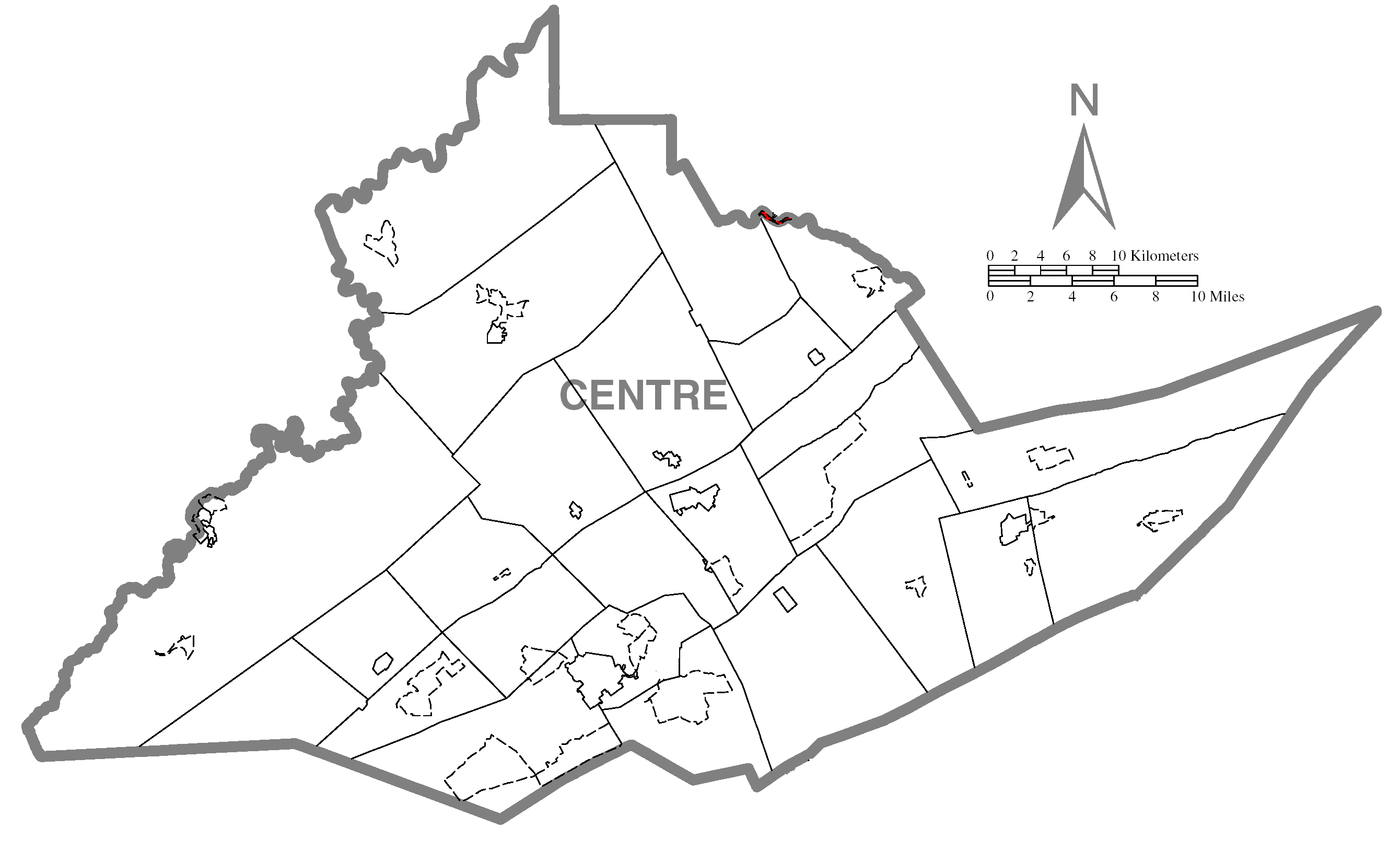
- Location within Centre County

- Location within the U.S. state of Pennsylvania Monument (the United States)
- Coordinates: 41°6′37″N 77°42′12″W
- Country: United States
- State: Pennsylvania
- County: Centre
- Township: Liberty

Area
  - Total: 0.089 sq mi (0.23 km^{2})
  - Land: 0.089 sq mi (0.23 km^{2})
  - Water: 0 sq mi (0.00 km^{2})
- Elevation: 759 ft (231 m)

Population (2020)
  - Total: 171
  - Density: 1,964.1/sq mi (758.36/km^{2})
- Time zone: UTC-5 (Eastern (EST))
  - Summer (DST): UTC-4 (EDT)
- FIPS code: 42-50760
- GNIS feature ID: 1181487

Monument is an unincorporated community and census-designated place in Centre County, Pennsylvania, United States. It is part of the State College, Pennsylvania Metropolitan Statistical Area. The population was 150 at the 2010 census.

The economy of Monument was heavily dependent on the brick-works that Harbison-Walker Refractories built in approximately 1901. This produced refractory bricks, used to line furnaces. The brick-works closed in May 1953.

== Geography ==
Monument is located along the northeastern border of Centre County at 41°6′37″N 77°42′12″W (41.110388, -77.703334). It is in the northern corner of Liberty Township, in the valley of Beech Creek, a southeastward-flowing tributary of Bald Eagle Creek and part of the Susquehanna River watershed.

Former Pennsylvania Route 364 passes through the town, leading west (up Beech Creek) 3 miles (5 km) to Orviston and southeast (downstream) 7 miles (11 km) to the borough of Beech Creek.

According to the United States Census Bureau, the CDP has a total area of 0.089 square miles (0.23 km^{2}), all land.

== Demographics ==
Historical population
| Census | Pop. | Note | %± |
|---|---|---|---|
| 2020 | 171 | | — |
U.S. Decennial Census

As of the census of 2000, there were 133 people, 52 households, and 35 families residing in the CDP. The population density was 697.5 people per square mile (269.3 people/km^{2}). There were 55 housing units at an average density of 288.4 per square mile (111.4/km^{2}). The racial makeup of the CDP was 98.50% White, and 1.50% from two or more races.

There were 52 households, out of which 38.5% had children under the age of 18 living with them, 63.5% were married couples living together, and 30.8% were non-families. 28.8% of all households were made up of individuals, and 13.5% had someone living alone who was 65 years of age or older. The average household size was 2.56 and the average family size was 3.17.

In the CDP, the population was spread out, with 27.1% under the age of 18, 5.3% from 18 to 24, 31.6% from 25 to 44, 23.3% from 45 to 64, and 12.8% who were 65 years of age or older. The median age was 36 years. For every 100 females, there were 84.7 males. For every 100 females age 18 and over, there were 98.0 males.

The median income for a household in the CDP was $28,542, and the median income for a family was $31,250. Males had a median income of $22,222 versus $15,625 for females. The per capita income for the CDP was $12,501. There were no families and 5.6% of the population living below the poverty line, including no under eighteens and 31.6% of those over 64.
