= West Perry High School =

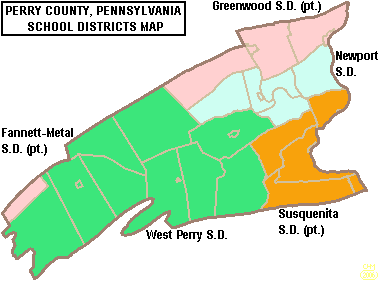
- Map of Perry County, Pennsylvania with West Perry School District highlighted in green

Location
- 2608 Shermans Valley Road; Perry County, Pennsylvania 17024-9706; United States; 40.3835°N 77.2997°W

Information
- Type: Public
- School district: West Perry School District
- Principal: Clark McCready
- Faculty: 55 teachers (2013)
- Teaching staff: 46.65 (FTE)
- Grades: 9th-12th
- Enrollment: 686 (2022-2023)
- Student to teacher ratio: 14.71
- Colors: Green and white
- Mascot: Mustang
- Feeder schools: West Perry Middle School
- Website: highschool.westperry.org

West Perry High School is a small, rural public high school located at 2608 Shermans Valley Road, in Perry County, Pennsylvania. The school is the only high school operated by the West Perry School District. In 2016, enrollment was reported as 811 pupils in 9th through 12th grades.

In 2015, enrollment was reported at 800 pupils. In 2014, enrollment was reported as 802 pupils in 9th through 12th grades, with 32.79% of pupils eligible for a free lunch due to family poverty. As of 2025, around 37% of students are impoverished and around 4% are homeless.

West Perry High School students may attend Cumberland Perry Area Vocational Technical School for training in the construction trades, mechanical trades, criminal justice, culinary arts, and allied health careers. Additionally, an extensive agriculture education program in association with FFA, is offered at the high school. For those students who prefer an online learning experience, West Perry High School offers cyber school called West Perry Virtual Academy through a program provided by the Capital Area Online Learning Association. Students can still participate in all extracurriculars offered at West Perry High School.

West Perry High School serves the boroughs of Blain, New Bloomfield and Landisburg, as well as, Carroll Township, Centre Township, Jackson Township, Northeast Madison Township, Saville Township, Spring Township, Southwest Madison Township, Toboyne Township (part), and Tyrone Township.

== Extracurriculars ==
West Perry High School offers various clubs, activities, and an extensive sports program.

West Perry's 1989 football team was the last undefeated team in Pennsylvania not to make the state playoffs, a distinction the school may hold forever since the playoff format has been massively expanded. Ten years later the football team, led by future University of Georgia and Baltimore Ravens running back Musa Smith, became the first squad in school history to make the post-season. The team faced the Central York Panthers in the first round of the playoffs, winning by a score of 42–0, making the Panthers the eighth team that season the Mustangs had forced the mercy rule upon. In the second game, the district finals, the Mustangs faced the Manheim Central Barons, winners of the ten previous District 3 AAA championships, and lost 28–21 with the game ending as West Perry reached the opponent's 1-yard line.

The West Perry baseball team won consecutive state AA titles in 1979 and 1980. The West Perry boys basketball team reached the state AAA semi-finals in 2006. The West Perry Field Hockey team captured the 2024 PIAA Class 1A state championship.

The school maintains athletic teams in the following sports:

Boys

- Baseball - AAA
- Basketball- AAA
- Cross country - AA
- Football - AAA
- Soccer - AA
- Track and field - AAA
- Wrestling - AAA

Girls

- Basketball - AAA
- Cheer - AAAA (added 2014)
- Cross country - AA
- Field hockey - AA
- Soccer - AA
- Softball - AAA
- Track and field - AAA
- Volleyball - AA

According to PIAA directory, July 2013

== Notable alumni ==
- Mark Keller, former Pennsylvania State Representative
- Sue Kullen, former Maryland State Representative
- Angie Loy, former USA Field Hockey team member, 2008 Summer Olympics
- Musa Smith, former professional football player, Baltimore Ravens
- Perry A. Stambaugh, Pennsylvania State Representative and former editor, Rural Electric Magazine, Penn Lines, and Pennsylvania Farmer
