= Egolf =

Egolf is a surname. Notable people with the surname include:

- Allan Egolf, politician
- Brian Egolf, politician
- Gretchen Egolf (born 1973), American actress
- Tristan Egolf (1971–2005), American novelist

== See also ==
- eGolf Professional Tour
- Volkswagen eGolf, vehicle
