= W. Brady Hetrick =

American politician

Member of the Pennsylvania House of Representatives from the 82nd district
- In office 1969–1972
- Preceded by: District created
- Succeeded by: Walter F. DeVerter

Member of the Pennsylvania House of Representatives from the Mifflin County district
- In office 1965–1968

Personal details
- Born: February 3, 1907 Harrisburg, Pennsylvania
- Died: August 5, 1999 (aged 92) Lewistown, Pennsylvania
- Party: Democratic

W. Brady Hetrick (February 3, 1907 – August 5, 1999) was a Democratic member of the Pennsylvania House of Representatives.
