= William J. Moore =

American politician (1923-2015)

Member of the Pennsylvania Senate from the 33rd district
- In office 1973–1988
- Preceded by: D. Elmer Hawbaker
- Succeeded by: Terry L. Punt

Member of the Pennsylvania House of Representatives from the 86th district
- In office 1971–1972
- Preceded by: Allan Holman
- Succeeded by: Fred C. Noye

Personal details
- Born: May 6, 1923 Muskogee, Oklahoma, U.S.
- Died: August 11, 2015 (aged 92) New Bloomfield, Pennsylvania, U.S.

William J. Moore, Sr. (May 6, 1923 – August 11, 2015) was a member of the Pennsylvania State Senate, serving from 1973 to 1988. He was a Republican member of the Pennsylvania House of Representatives from 1971 to 1972. He died in 2015.
