= Fred C. Noye =

American politician (1946–2024)

Member of the Pennsylvania House of Representatives from the 86th district
- In office 1973–1992
- Preceded by: William J. Moore
- Succeeded by: Allan Egolf

Personal details
- Born: May 13, 1946 Duncannon, Pennsylvania, U.S.
- Died: February 24, 2024 (aged 77)
- Party: Republican

Fred Charles Noye (May 13, 1946 – February 24, 2024) was an American politician who was a Republican member of the Pennsylvania House of Representatives. Noye died on February 24, 2024, at the age of 77.
