= Paul Takac =

American politician

Member of the Pennsylvania House of Representatives from the 82nd district
- Incumbent
- Assumed office January 3, 2023
- Preceded by: John D. Hershey

Personal details
- Born: c. 1965
- Party: Democratic
- Spouse: Regan W.
- Children: 3
- Education: State University of New York at Buffalo (B.A.); Southern Methodist University (M.A.); Maryland University of Integrative Health (M.S.)
- Alma mater: Orchard Park High School

Paul R. Takac Jr. (born c. 1965) is an American politician who is currently a Democratic member of the Pennsylvania House of Representatives, representing the 82nd District since 2023.

== Early life and education ==
Takac and his sister were born into a family where both their mother and father were employed. When he was 10 years old, Takac's mother died of cancer, and his father subsequently lost his job and struggled with addiction. Through his father's disability pension, Takac was able to get an education.

Takac graduated from Orchard Park High School in 1983. He earned a Bachelor of Arts degree from State University of New York at Buffalo in 1987 and a Master of Arts from Southern Methodist University in 1991. Takac earned an M.S. degree from Maryland University of Integrative Health in 2018.

Takac worked for Apple Inc. for over twenty years prior to serving in the Pennsylvania House of Representatives.

== Political career ==
Prior to his run for Pennsylvania State Representative, Takac was a member of the College Township Council. His term started in January 2020. He also chaired the Spring Creek Watershed Commission and the Centre Region Council of Government's Public Safety Committee.

In 2022, Takac ran for the newly redrawn 82nd District. The race was seen as competitive, but Takac ultimately won, defeating Republican candidate Justin Behrens.

== Personal life ==
For over twenty years, Takac and his wife, Regan W., have lived in Happy Valley, Pennsylvania, where they raised their three children.

== Electoral history ==
2019 College Township Council election
Party	Candidate	Votes	%
Democratic	Carla Stilson	1,810	25.50
Democratic	Paul Takac	1,714	24.15
Democratic/Republican	D. Richard Francke	1,794	25.28
Republican	Steven J. Lyncha	1,074	15.13
No Affiliation	Dustin E. Best	690	9.72
Write-in		15	0.21
Total votes		7,097	100.00

2022 Pennsylvania House of Representatives election, District 82
Party	Candidate	Votes	%
Democratic	Paul Takac	12,739	56.18
Republican	Justin V. Behrens	9,870	43.53
Write-in		67	0.30
Total votes		22,676	100.00

2024 Pennsylvania House of Representatives election, District 82
Party	Candidate	Votes	%
Democratic	Paul Takac (incumbent)	16,558	53.70
Republican	Therese Hollen	14,221	46.12
Write-in		56	0.18
Total votes		30,835	100.00
