= Daniel F. Clark =

American politician

Member of the Pennsylvania House of Representatives from the 82nd district
- In office January 3, 1989 – November 30, 2002
- Preceded by: Walter F. DeVerter
- Succeeded by: Adam Harris

Personal details
- Born: December 11, 1954 Thompsontown, Pennsylvania
- Died: September 28, 2014 (aged 59) Mifflintown, Pennsylvania
- Party: Republican
- Spouse: Lisa F.
- Education: Lycoming College; Duquesne University School of Law
- Occupation: Attorney

Daniel F. Clark (December 11, 1954 – September 28, 2014) was a Republican Pennsylvania House of Representatives member.

He is a 1972 graduate of East Juniata High School. He earned a degree in accounting from Lycoming College in 1976 and a law degree from Duquesne University School of Law in 1979. He was first elected to represent the 82nd legislative district in the Pennsylvania House of Representatives in 1988. He retired prior to the 2002 election. On September 28, 2014, Clark died of lung cancer at the age of 59.
