= Eagleville, Centre County, Pennsylvania =

Unincorporated community in Pennsylvania, US

Eagleville, Pennsylvania
- Census-designated place
- Location of Eagleville in Pennsylvania Eagleville, Pennsylvania (the United States)
- Coordinates: 41°03′23″N 77°35′34″W
- Country: United States
- State: Pennsylvania
- County: Centre
- Township: Liberty

Area
  - Total: 0.95 sq mi (2.5 km^{2})
  - Land: 0.95 sq mi (2.5 km^{2})
  - Water: 0.0 sq mi (0 km^{2})
- Elevation: 636 ft (194 m)

Population (2010)
  - Total: 324
  - Density: 340/sq mi (130/km^{2})
- Time zone: UTC-5 (EST)
  - Summer (DST): UTC-4 (EDT)
- Area code: 814

Eagleville is a census-designated place (CDP) in Centre County, Pennsylvania, United States. The population was 324 at the 2010 census.

== Geography ==
Eagleville is located in northeastern Centre County at 41°03′23″N 77°35′34″W (41.0564538, -77.5927705), in the eastern corner of Liberty Township. It is bordered to the north by Bald Eagle Creek, a tributary of the West Branch Susquehanna River. The community of Blanchard is 0.5 miles (0.8 km) to the northwest across Bald Eagle Creek.

According to the United States Census Bureau, the Eagleville CDP has a total area of 0.95 square miles (2.45 km^{2}), all

land.[1]
