= Christian Bechdel II House =

Historic house in Pennsylvania, United States

- U.S. National Register of Historic Places
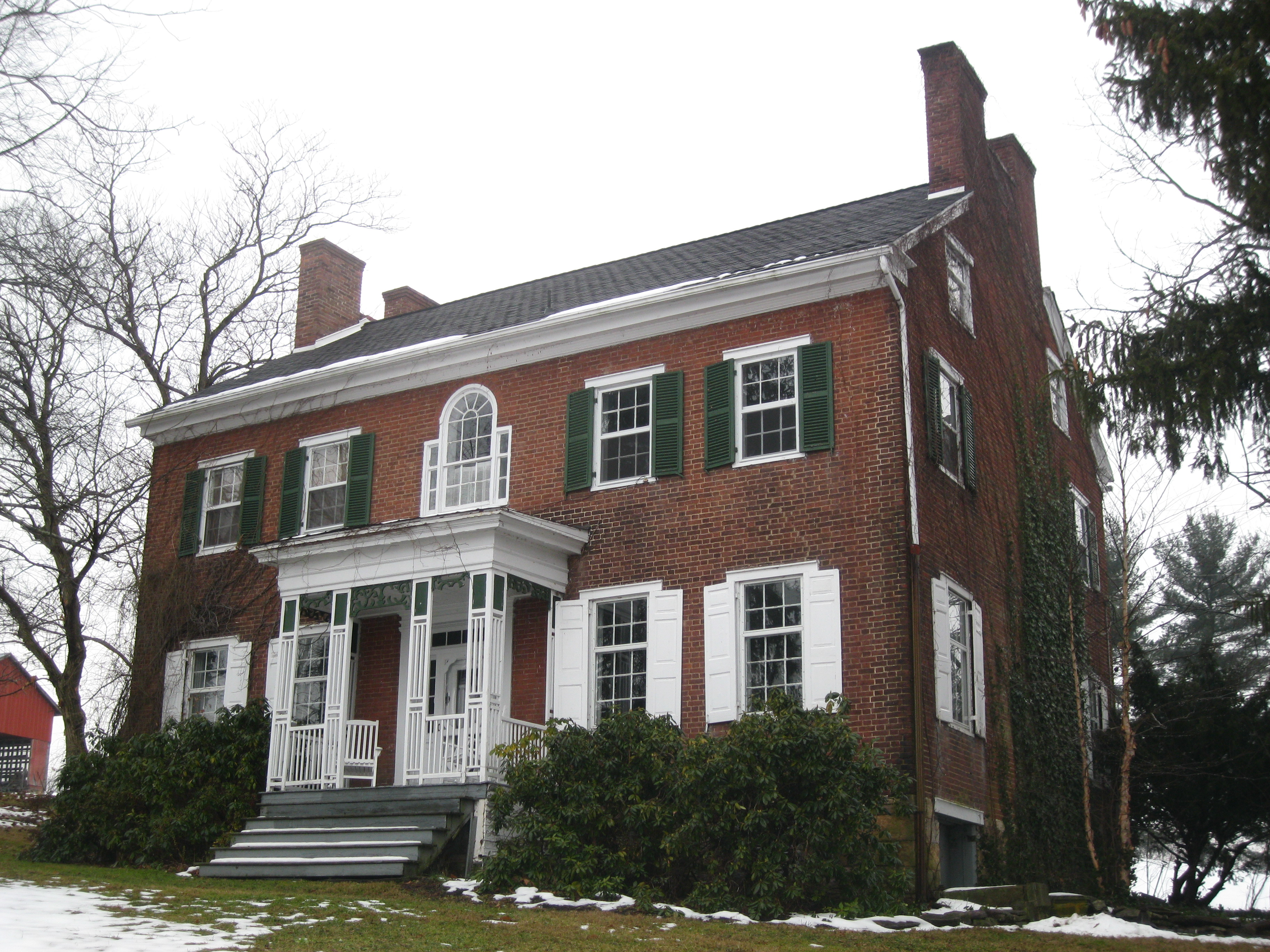
- The house in 2013

- Location within Pennsylvania Location within the United States
- Location: South of Blanchard on Liberty Road, Liberty Township, Pennsylvania
- Coordinates: 41°3′31″N 77°36′16″W
- Area: 0.1 acres (0.040 ha)
- Built: 1831
- Architectural style: Georgian
- NRHP reference No.: 82003775
- Added to NRHP: March 1, 1982

Christian Bechdel II House is a historic home located at Liberty Township, Centre County, Pennsylvania. It was built in 1831, and is a two-story, five bay rectangular brick building measuring 42 feet 8 inches (13.00 m), across and 32 feet 6 inches (9.91 m), deep in the Georgian style architecture. The front facade features a Palladian window in the central bay of the second story. It has a medium pitch, gable roof and a center hall plan interior.

It was added to the National Register of Historic Places in 1982.
