= Adam Harris (politician) =

American politician (born 1975)

C. Adam Harris
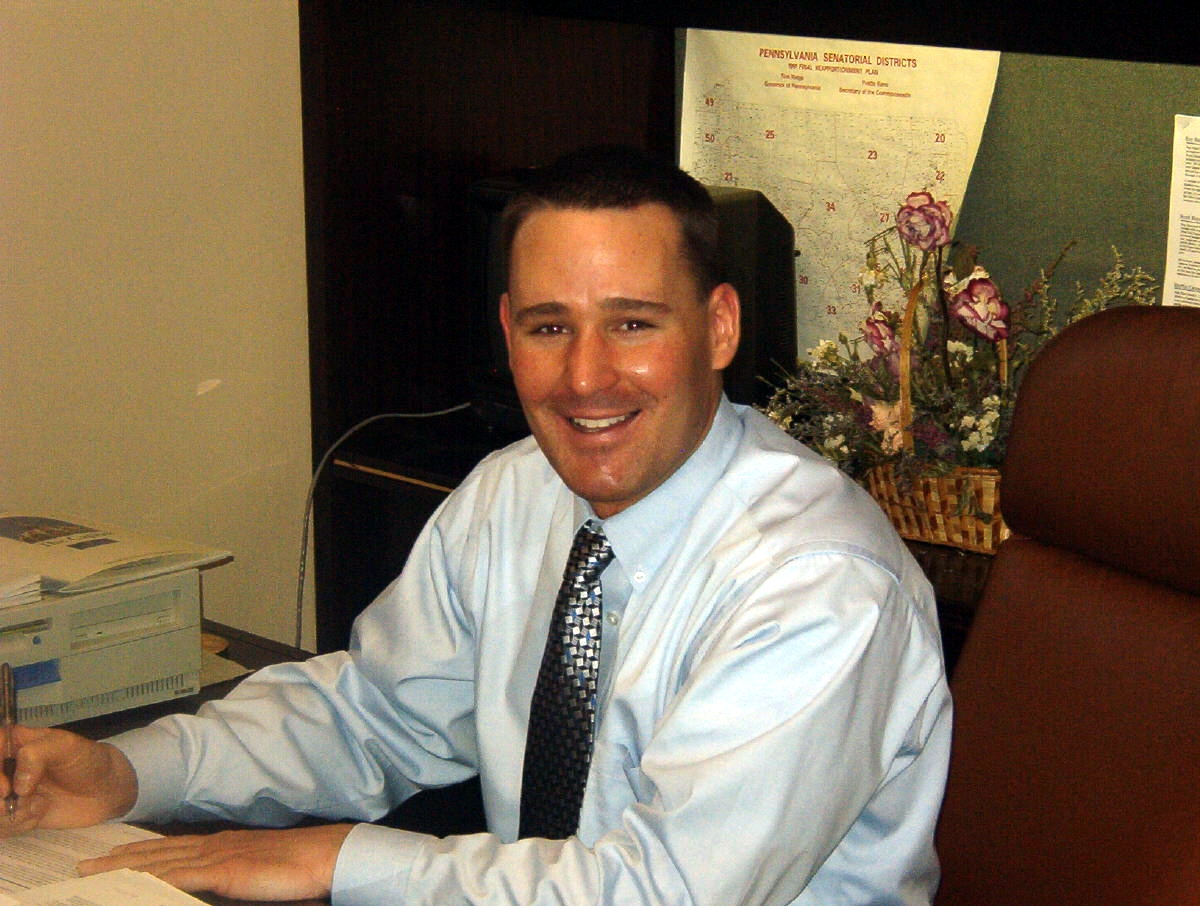
- Harris at his desk in the Pennsylvania State Capitol

Member of the Pennsylvania House of Representatives from the 82nd district
- In office January 7, 2003 – December 31, 2018
- Preceded by: Daniel F. Clark
- Succeeded by: Johnathan D. Hershey

Personal details
- Born: October 14, 1975 (age 50) Lewistown, Pennsylvania
- Party: Republican
- Education: Susquehanna University
- Website: www.repadamharris.com

C. Adam Harris (born October 14, 1975) is a former Republican member of the Pennsylvania House of Representatives for the 82nd District. He was elected in 2002 and served until 2018.

== Career ==
After graduating from college, Harris joined the House Commerce and Economic Development Committee as a research analyst. He ran for the House in 2002 with the retirement of Rep. Daniel Clark. Harris won re-election to his Juniata County district every other year from 2004 to 2016.

Harris served as Chairman of the House Liquor Control Committee.

In 2018, Harris announced that he would not seek reelection.

Harris graduated from Susquehanna University in 1998 with a degree in political science.
