= Walter DeVerter =

American politician

Walter F. DeVerter

Member of the Pennsylvania House of Representatives from the 82nd district
- In office 1973–1988
- Preceded by: W. Brady Hetrick
- Succeeded by: Daniel F. Clark

Personal details
- Born: August 25, 1935 Hershey, Pennsylvania
- Died: April 7, 2017 (aged 81) Camp Hill, Pennsylvania
- Party: Republican

Walter F. DeVerter (August 25, 1935 – April 7, 2017) was a Republican member of the Pennsylvania House of Representatives.
