= Mark Keller (politician) =

American politician

Mark K. Keller

Member of the Pennsylvania House of Representatives from the 86th district
- In office January 4, 2005 – November 30, 2020
- Preceded by: C. Allan Egolf
- Succeeded by: Perry A. Stambaugh

Personal details
- Born: January 14, 1954 (age 72) Carlisle, Pennsylvania, U.S.
- Party: Republican
- Spouse: Sally Keller
- Children: Bryan Keller
- Education: Penn State University
- Website: www.repkeller.com

Mark K. Keller (born January 14, 1954) is a former Republican member of the Pennsylvania House of Representatives for the 86th District. He was elected in 2004 and left office at the end of his eighth term in November 2020. He formerly sat on the House Agriculture & Rural Affairs, Game & Fisheries, Local Government, and Transportation Committees.

== Early life and education ==
Keller was born in Carlisle, Pennsylvania on January 14, 1954. He graduated from West Perry High School. He attended the Missouri Auction School and is a member of the Pennsylvania Auctioneers Association. He also attended some classes at Penn State University.

== Career ==
Representative Keller advocated for rural and agricultural issues and considered protecting farmers and small businesses top legislative priorities.

== Personal ==
Keller and his wife, Sally, reside in Landisburg, Pennsylvania, and have one son, Bryan. Keller and his family currently attend Mt. Zion Free Lutheran church in Landisburg.
