= Blanchard, Centre County, Pennsylvania =

Census-designated place in Pennsylvania, US

Blanchard, Pennsylvania
- Census-designated place
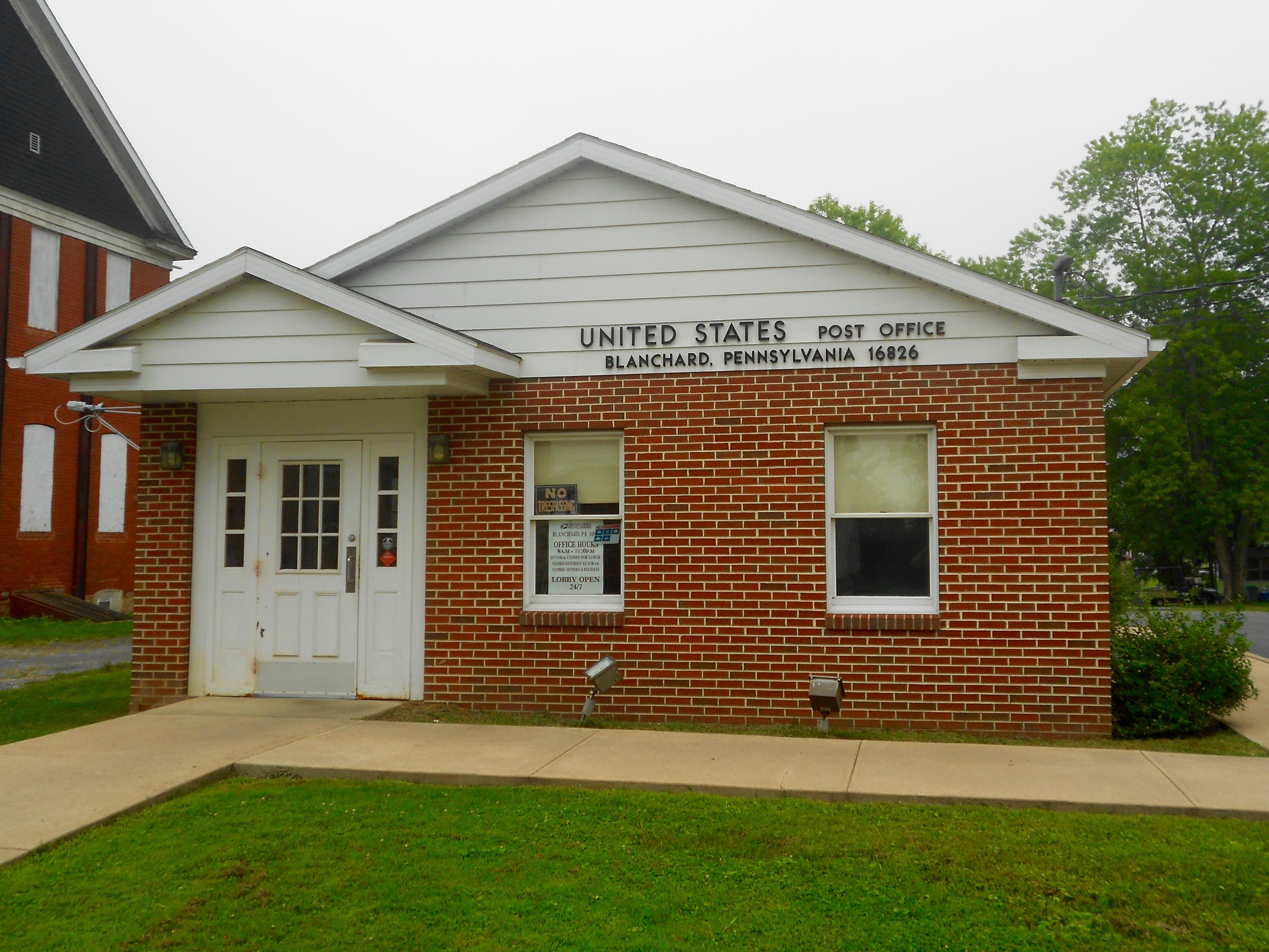
- Blanchard post office

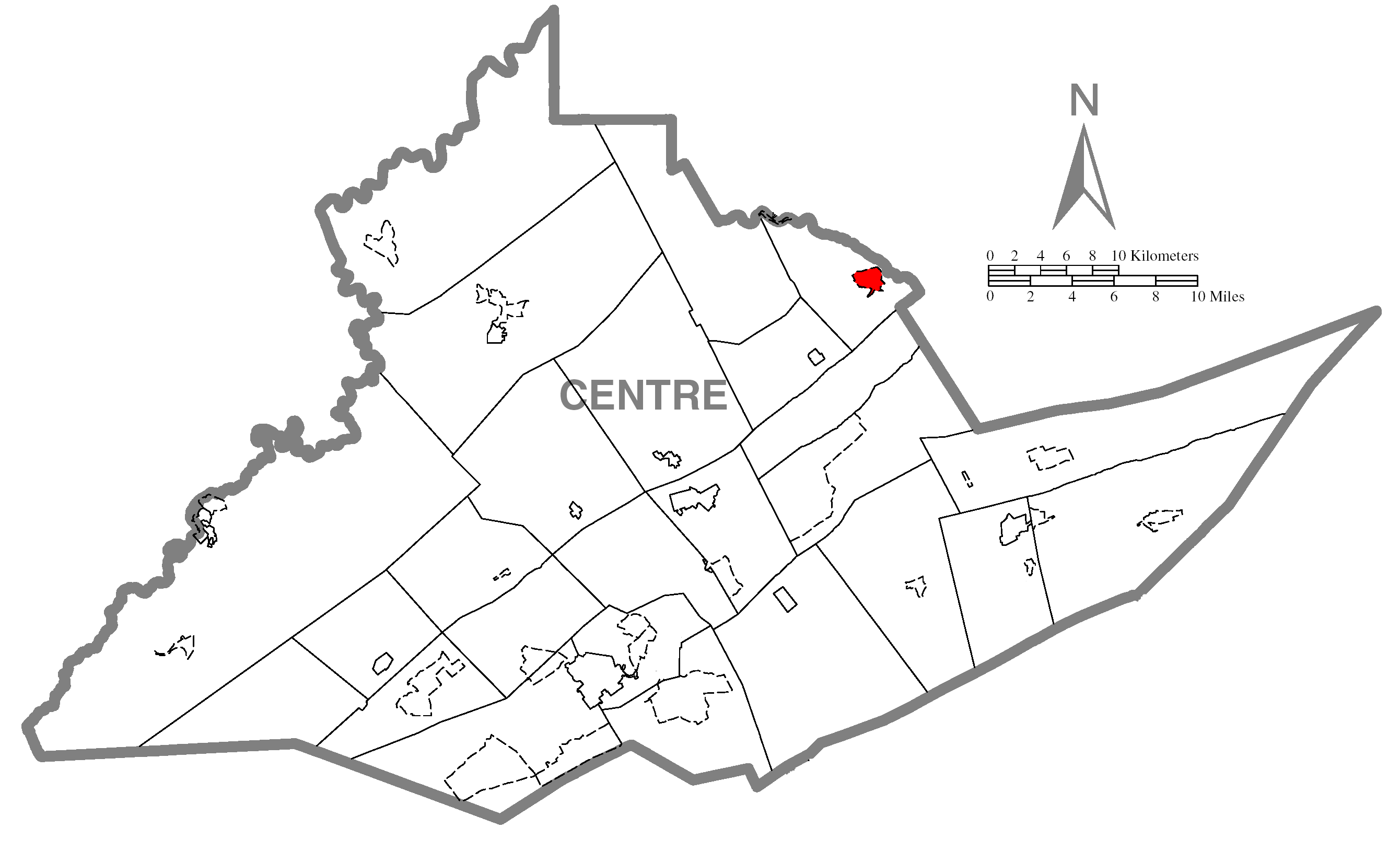
- Location within Centre County

- Location within the state of Pennsylvania Blanchard (the United States)
- Coordinates: 41°3′45″N 77°36′8″W
- Country: United States
- State: Pennsylvania
- County: Centre
- Township: Liberty

Area
  - Total: 1.43 sq mi (3.70 km^{2})
  - Land: 1.43 sq mi (3.70 km^{2})
  - Water: 0 sq mi (0.00 km^{2})
- Elevation: 645 ft (197 m)

Population (2020)
  - Total: 597
  - Density: 418.2/sq mi (161.46/km^{2})
- Time zone: UTC-5 (Eastern (EST))
  - Summer (DST): UTC-4 (EDT)
- ZIP code: 16826
- FIPS code: 42-06960
- GNIS code: 1192165

Blanchard is a census-designated place (CDP) in Centre County, Pennsylvania, United States. It is part of the State College, Pennsylvania Metropolitan Statistical Area. The population was 740 at the 2010 census.

== Geography ==
Blanchard is located in northeastern Centre County, east of the geographic center of Liberty Township, in the valley of Bald Eagle Creek, a northeastward-flowing tributary of the West Branch Susquehanna River. The community of Eagleville is to the southeast, across the creek. Pennsylvania Route 150 passes through Blanchard, leading northeast 1 mile (1.6 km) to the borough of Beech Creek in Clinton County and southwest 12 miles (19 km) to Interstate 80 near Milesburg. Bald Eagle State Park, containing Joseph Foster Sayers Reservoir on Bald Eagle Creek, is 3 miles (5 km) to the southwest along PA 150.

According to the United States Census Bureau, the Blanchard CDP has a total area of 1.2 square miles (3.2 km^{2}), all land.

== Demographics ==
Historical population
Census	Pop.	Note	%±
2020	597		—
U.S. Decennial Census

At the 2010 census, there were 740 people, 293 households and 212 families living in the CDP. The population density was 618.3 inhabitants per square mile (238.7/km^{2}). There were 317 housing units at an average density of 264.9/sq mi (102.3/km^{2}). The racial makeup of the CDP was 97.5% White, 1.1% Native American, 0.3% Asian, 0.3% other, and 0.8% of two or more races. Hispanic or Latino of any race were 0.4% of the population.

There were 293 households, of which 33.8% had children under the age of 18 living with them, 53.9% were married couples living together, 8.2% had a male householder with no wife present, 10.2% had a female householder with no husband present, and 27.7% were non-families. 23.5% of all households were made up of individuals, and 11.6% had someone living alone who was 65 years of age or older. The average household size was 2.53 and the average family size was 2.97.

23.6% of the population were under the age of 18, 6.3% from 18 to 24, 25.6% from 25 to 44, 28.3% from 45 to 64, and 16.2% who were 65 years of age or older. The median age was 40 years. For every 100 females, there were 99.5 males. For every 100 females age 18 and over, there were 101.1 males.

The median household income was $33,906 and the median family income was $52,625. The per capita income for the CDP was $19,064. About 14.3% of families and 14.6% of the population were below the poverty line.
