= Pennsylvania House of Representatives, District 86 =

American legislative district

Pennsylvania's 86th State House of Representatives district
Representative
Perry A. Stambaugh; R–Green Park
- Population (2022): 64,092

The 86th Pennsylvania House of Representatives District is located in central Pennsylvania and has been represented by Perry A. Stambaugh since 2021.

== District profile ==
The 86th District encompasses all of Perry County and the following parts of Juniata County:

- Beale Township
- Delaware Township
- Fermanagh Township
- Greenwood Township
- Lack Township
- Mifflin
- Mifflintown
- Milford Township
- Port Royal
- Spruce Hill Township
- Susquehanna Township
- Thompsontown
- Turbett Township
- Tuscarora Township
- Walker Township

== Representatives ==
Representative	Party	Years	District home	Note
Prior to 1969, seats were apportioned by county.
Allan W. Holman Jr.	Republican	1969 – 1970	New Bloomfield	
William J. Moore	Republican	1971 – 1972	New Bloomfield	
Fred C. Noye	Republican	1973 – 1992	Duncannon; New Bloomfield	
C. Allan Egolf	Republican	1993 – 2004	Landisburg	
Mark Keller	Republican	2005 – 2020	Elliottsburg	
Perry A. Stambaugh	Republican	2021 – present	Green Park	Incumbent

== Recent election results ==
PA House election, 2024: Pennsylvania House, District 86
Party	Candidate	Votes	%
Republican	Perry A. Stambaugh (incumbent)	Unopposed	
Total votes		29,341	100.00
Republican hold			

PA House election, 2022: Pennsylvania House, District 86
Party	Candidate	Votes	%
Republican	Perry A. Stambaugh (incumbent)	Unopposed	
Total votes		22,536	100.00
Republican hold			

PA House election, 2020: Pennsylvania House, District 86
Party	Candidate	Votes	%
Republican	Perry A. Stambaugh	Unopposed	
Total votes		27,355	100.00
Republican hold			

PA House election, 2018: Pennsylvania House, District 86
Party	Candidate	Votes	%
Republican	Mark Keller (incumbent)	16,153	71.88
Democratic	Karen Anderson	6,319	28.12
Total votes		22,472	100.00
Republican hold			

PA House election, 2016: Pennsylvania House, District 86
Party	Candidate	Votes	%
Republican	Mark Keller (incumbent)	Unopposed	
Total votes		25,021	100.00
Republican hold			
