= Liberty Township, Centre County, Pennsylvania =

Township in Pennsylvania, US

Coordinates: 41°05′00″N 77°39′59″W

Liberty Township
- Township
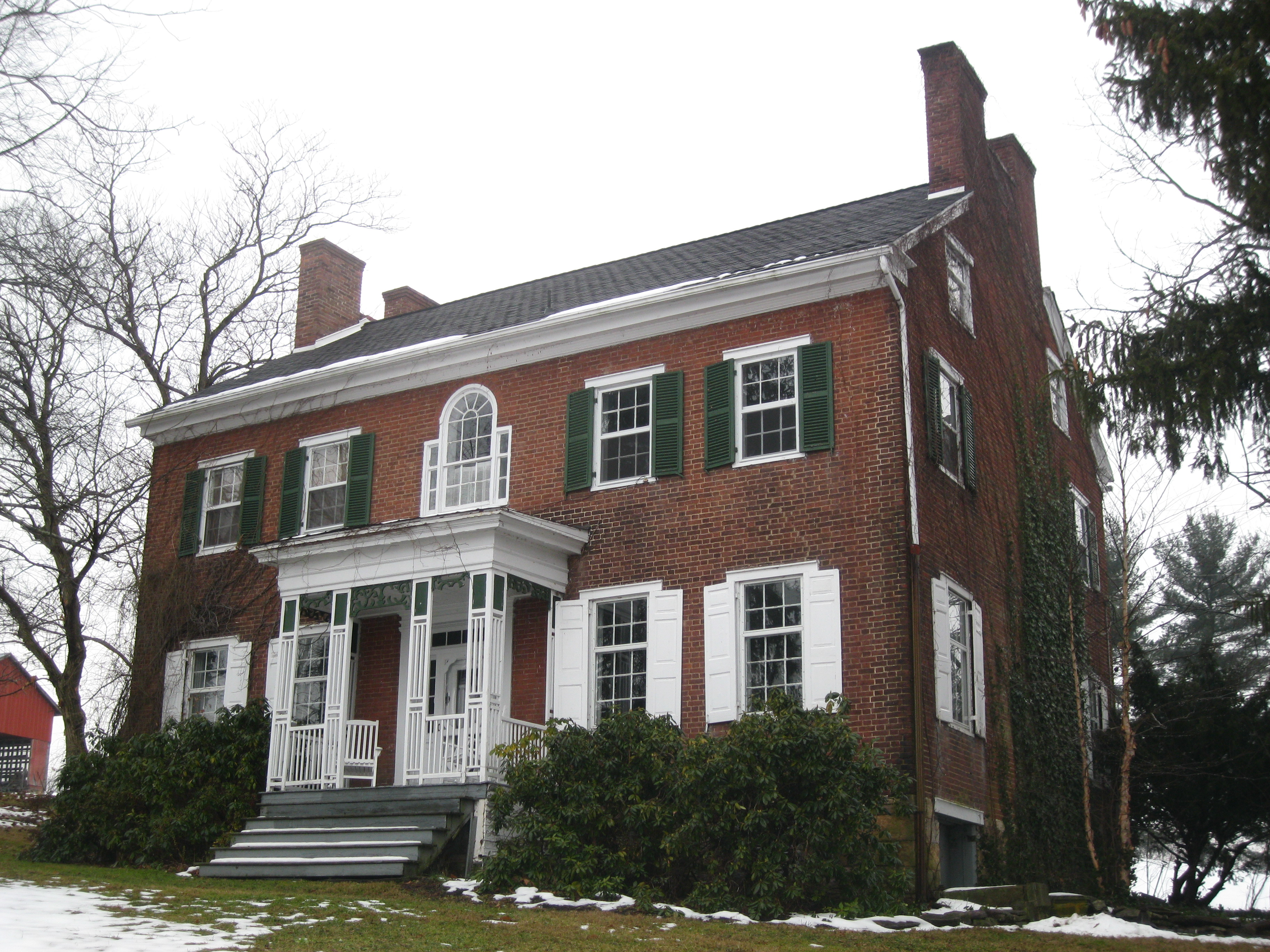
- The Christian Bechdel II House, a historic site in the township

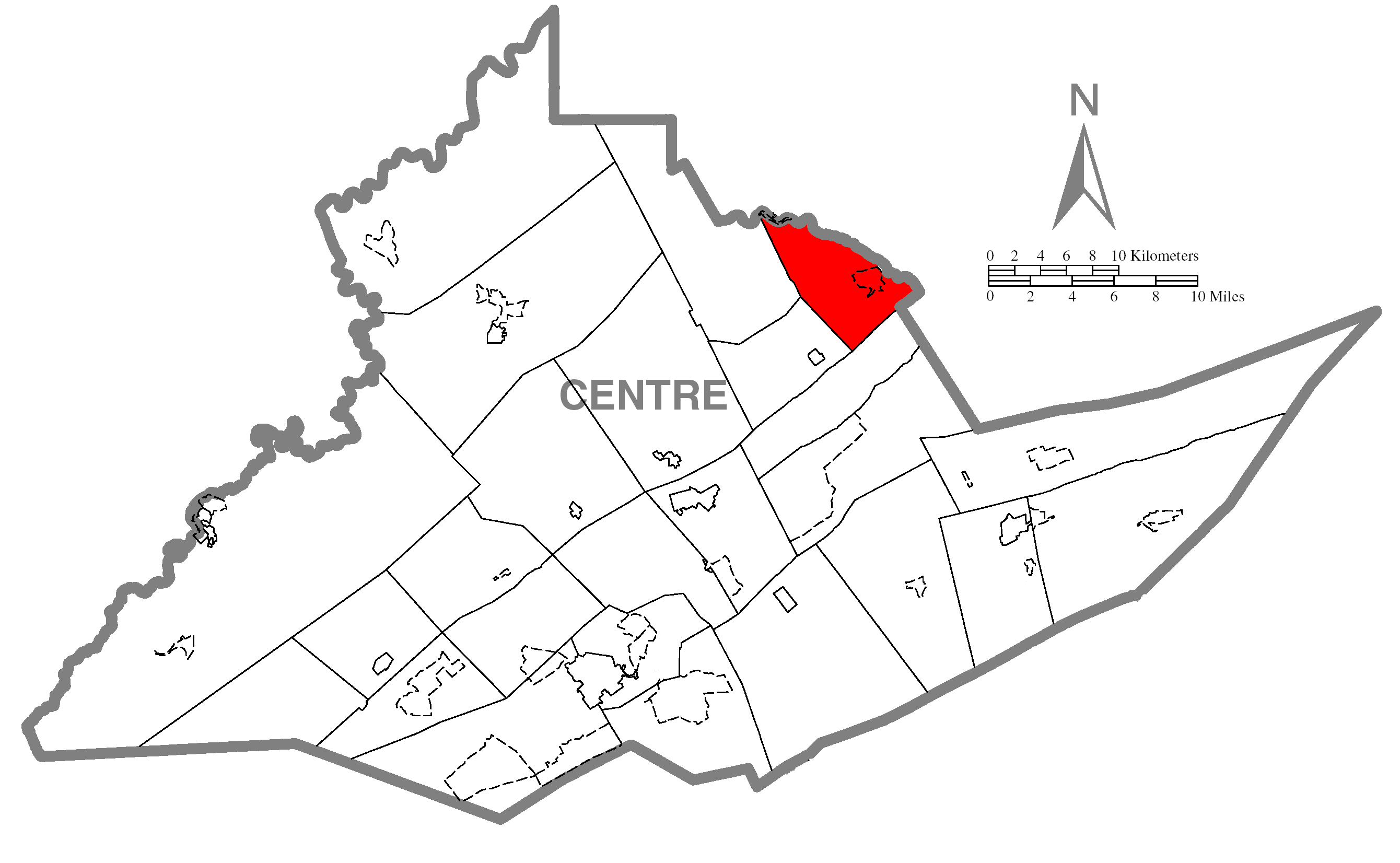
- Map of Centre County, Pennsylvania highlighting Liberty Township

- Map of Centre County, Pennsylvania
- Country: United States
- State: Pennsylvania
- County: Centre
- Settled: 1790
- Incorporated: 1845

Area
  - Total: 24.69 sq mi (63.95 km^{2})
  - Land: 23.95 sq mi (62.04 km^{2})
  - Water: 0.74 sq mi (1.92 km^{2})

Population (2020)
  - Total: 1,825 ▼
  - Estimate (2021): 1,810
  - Density: 87.7/sq mi (33.88/km^{2})
- FIPS code: 42-027-43080

Liberty Township is a township in Centre County, Pennsylvania, United States. It is part of the State College, Pennsylvania Metropolitan Statistical Area. The population was 1,825 at the 2020 census, an increase over the figure of 2,118 tabulated in 2010. Part of Bald Eagle State Park is in Liberty Township.

== History ==
The Christian Bechdel II House was added to the National Register of Historic Places in 1982.

== Geography ==
According to the United States Census Bureau, the township has a total area of 24.7 square miles (64.0 km^{2}), of which 23.9 square miles (62.0 km^{2}) is land and 0.73 square miles (1.9 km^{2}), or 3.00%, is water.

Liberty Township is bordered by Clinton County to the northeast, Marion Township to the southeast, Howard Township to the southwest, and Curtin Township to the west.

The township contains the census-designated places of Blanchard, Eagleville, and Monument.

== Demographics ==
Historical population
Census	Pop.	Note	%±
2000	1,830		—
2010	2,118		15.7%
2020	1,825		−13.8%
2021 (est.)	1,810		−0.8%
U.S. Decennial Census

As of the census of 2000, there were 1,830 people, 719 households, and 532 families residing in the township. The population density was 83.9 inhabitants per square mile (32.4/km^{2}). There were 825 housing units at an average density of 37.8 per square mile (14.6/km^{2}). The racial makeup of the township was 99.13% White, 0.22% Native American, 0.05% Asian, and 0.60% from two or more races. Hispanic or Latino of any race were 0.22% of the population.

There were 719 households, out of which 32.7% had children under the age of 18 living with them, 60.9% were married couples living together, 6.3% had a female householder with no husband present, and 26.0% were non-families. 22.0% of all households were made up of individuals, and 10.3% had someone living alone who was 65 years of age or older. The average household size was 2.53 and the average family size was 2.92.

In the township the population was spread out, with 24.0% under the age of 18, 7.2% from 18 to 24, 29.2% from 25 to 44, 25.7% from 45 to 64, and 13.9% who were 65 years of age or older. The median age was 38 years. For every 100 females there were 98.7 males. For every 100 females age 18 and over, there were 99.7 males.

The median income for a household in the township was $31,667, and the median income for a family was $36,875. Males had a median income of $27,442 versus $19,622 for females. The per capita income for the township was $15,814. About 4.6% of families and 8.9% of the population were below the poverty line, including 7.8% of those under age 18 and 14.0% of those age 65 or over.

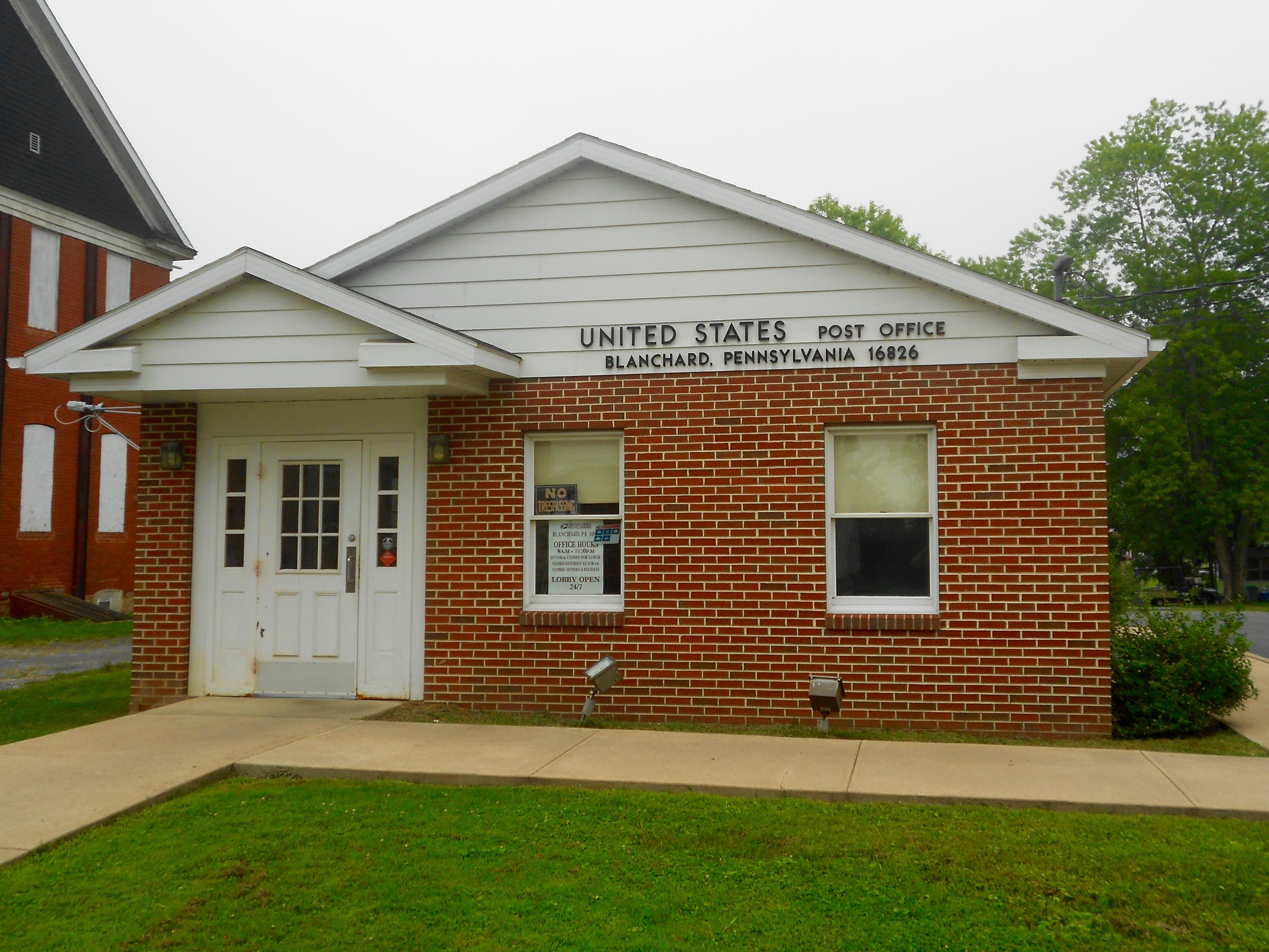
Blanchard post office
