= Musa Smith =

American football player (born 1982)

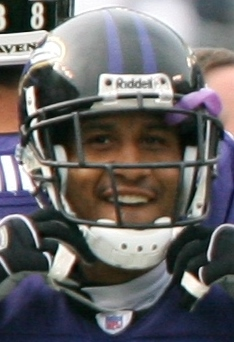
- Smith with the Baltimore Ravens in 2006

No. 32
- Position: Running back

Personal information
- Born: May 31, 1982 (age 44); New Bloomfield, Pennsylvania, U.S.
- Listed height: 6 ft 0 in (1.83 m)
- Listed weight: 232 lb (105 kg)

Career information
- High school: Elliottsburg (PA) West Perry
- College: Georgia
- NFL draft: 2003: 3rd round, 77th overall pick

Career history
- Baltimore Ravens (2003–2007); New York Jets (2008)*
- * Offseason or practice squad member only

Awards and highlights
- First-team All-SEC (2002)

Career NFL statistics
- Rushing yards: 496
- Rushing average: 3.8
- Receptions: 54
- Receiving yards: 363
- Total touchdowns: 4
- Stats at Pro Football Reference

Musa Smith (/ˈmuːsə/; born May 31, 1982) is an American former professional football player who was a running back for five seasons in the National Football League (NFL). He played college football for the Georgia Bulldogs and was selected by the Baltimore Ravens in the third round of the 2003 NFL draft. Smith was also a member of the New York Jets.

== Early life ==
Smith attended West Perry High School in Perry County, Pennsylvania, where he was a USA Today honorable mention "All-USA" selection in football.

== College career ==
At the University of Georgia, Smith rushed for 2,202 yards and 19 touchdowns on 454 carries (4.9 yards per carry) during his three-year career at Georgia. This included a spectacular junior campaign in 2002, when he rushed for 1,324 yards and eight touchdowns on 261 carries (5.1 yards per carry), becoming the first Georgia running back to pass 1,000-yards in a season since Garrison Hearst in 1992.

Smith played a starring role in Georgia's 2003 Sugar Bowl victory over Florida State on January 1, 2003, carrying the ball 23 times for 145 yards in Georgia's 26–13 win.

== Professional career ==
Pre-draft measurables
Height	Weight	Arm length	Hand span	40-yard dash	Vertical jump	Broad jump
6 ft 0 3/4 in (1.85 m)	232 lb (105 kg)	31 7/8 in (0.81 m)	8 in (0.20 m)	4.58 s	35.5 in (0.90 m)	10 ft 3 in (3.12 m)
40-yard dash was taken at Georgia's Pro Day; other results are from the NFL Scouting Combine.

=== Baltimore Ravens ===
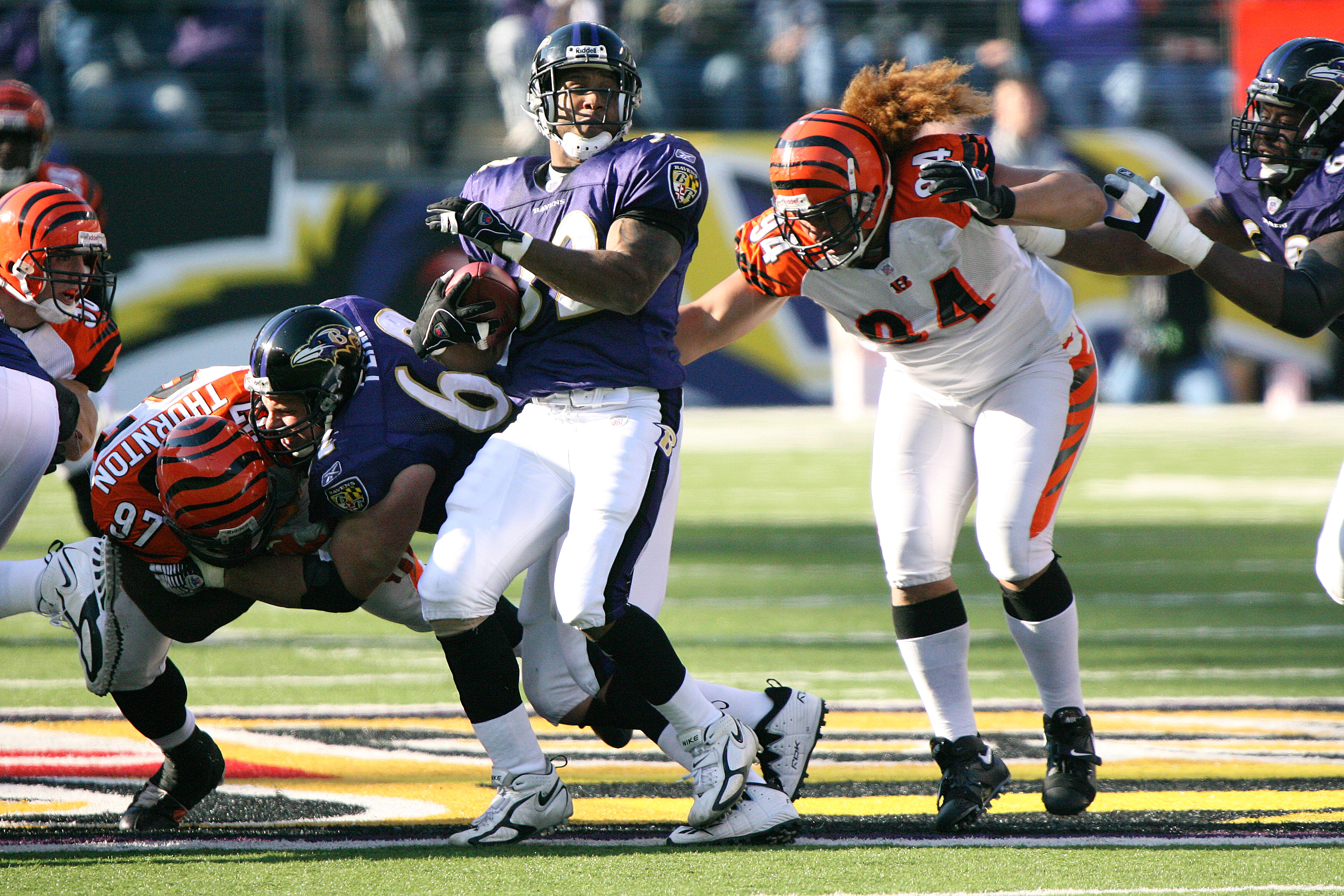
Smith being tackled by Domata Peko of the Cincinnati Bengals in 2006

Smith was drafted with the 13th pick of the third round (77th overall) in the 2003 NFL draft. He played sparingly for much of 2003 and 2004.

During a Week 11 game with the Dallas Cowboys in 2004, Smith was horse-collar tackled from behind by safety Roy Williams. Smith's right leg was trapped under the weight of his body, resulting in a severe compound fracture of his right tibia. The injury basically put Smith out of action for two seasons (he played only one game in 2005) and led to the NFL banning the tackle in May 2005.

In the 2006 Ravens training camp, Smith outplayed Mike Anderson in the battle for the backup running back job behind Jamal Lewis. In three preseason games in 2006, Smith was tied for the NFL lead with LaMont Jordan with 123 rushing yards on 13 carries (7.9 yards per carry).

In total, Smith has rushed for 262 yards and three touchdowns on 62 carries (4.2 yards per carry) in 34 regular season appearances with the Baltimore Ravens, he has also caught 28 passes for 180 yards as of the end of the 2006 season.

He was the backup to Willis McGahee and had an increased role in the 2007 season as in past years he mainly played on special teams. Smith had 264 rushing yards and two touchdowns that year.

Through his stay with the Ravens, Smith collected 132 rushes for 496 yards, and four touchdowns on a 3.8 yard average. He also had 54 catches for 363 yards, on a 6.7 yard receiving average.

=== New York Jets ===
On May 27, 2008, Smith was signed by the New York Jets. He was later released on August 26 prior to the regular season.

== Personal life ==
Smith is a Muslim. His name translates to Moses in Arabic. He has a brother, Taalib, who is a personal trainer at the Big Vanilla Health Club in Arnold, Maryland. Smith has three children.

Smith's father, Kelvin Smith, ran training camps for Boy Scouts, law officers from the family farm in New Bloomfield, Pennsylvania, and as an agent with the U.S. Fish and Wildlife Service. In 1999, he was convicted on charges related to the 1993 World Trade Center bombing.
