= Allan Egolf =

American politician (1938–2021)

C. Allan Egolf

Member of the Pennsylvania House of Representatives from the 86th district
- In office January 5, 1993 – November 30, 2004
- Preceded by: Fred C. Noye
- Succeeded by: Mark Keller

Personal details
- Born: June 7, 1938 Carlisle, Pennsylvania, U.S.
- Died: September 10, 2021 (aged 83) Camp Hill, Pennsylvania, U.S.
- Party: Republican
- Spouse: Nancy
- Children: Mark, Pamela
- Education: Pennsylvania State University
- Occupation: U.S. Air Force

Military service
- Allegiance: United States
- Branch/service: United States Air Force
- Rank: Colonel
- Unit: 5th Weather Wing Chief of Operations

C. Allan Egolf (June 7, 1938 – September 10, 2021) was a Republican member of the Pennsylvania House of Representatives.

== Education ==
He was a 1956 graduate of Green Park Union High School. He earned a B.S. in education from Penn State University in 1961 and a B.S. equivalent in meteorology from Texas A&M University in 1967. In 1978, he earned a M.Ed. in meteorology and earth sciences from Penn State University.

== Career ==
He was first elected to represent the 86th legislative district in the Pennsylvania House of Representatives in 1992. He retired prior to the 2004 election.

== Death ==
Egolf died on September 10, 2021, in Camp Hill, Pennsylvania, at age 83.
