= Green Park, Pennsylvania =

Unincorporated community in Pennsylvania, U.S.

Coordinates: 40.37825°N 77.31189°W

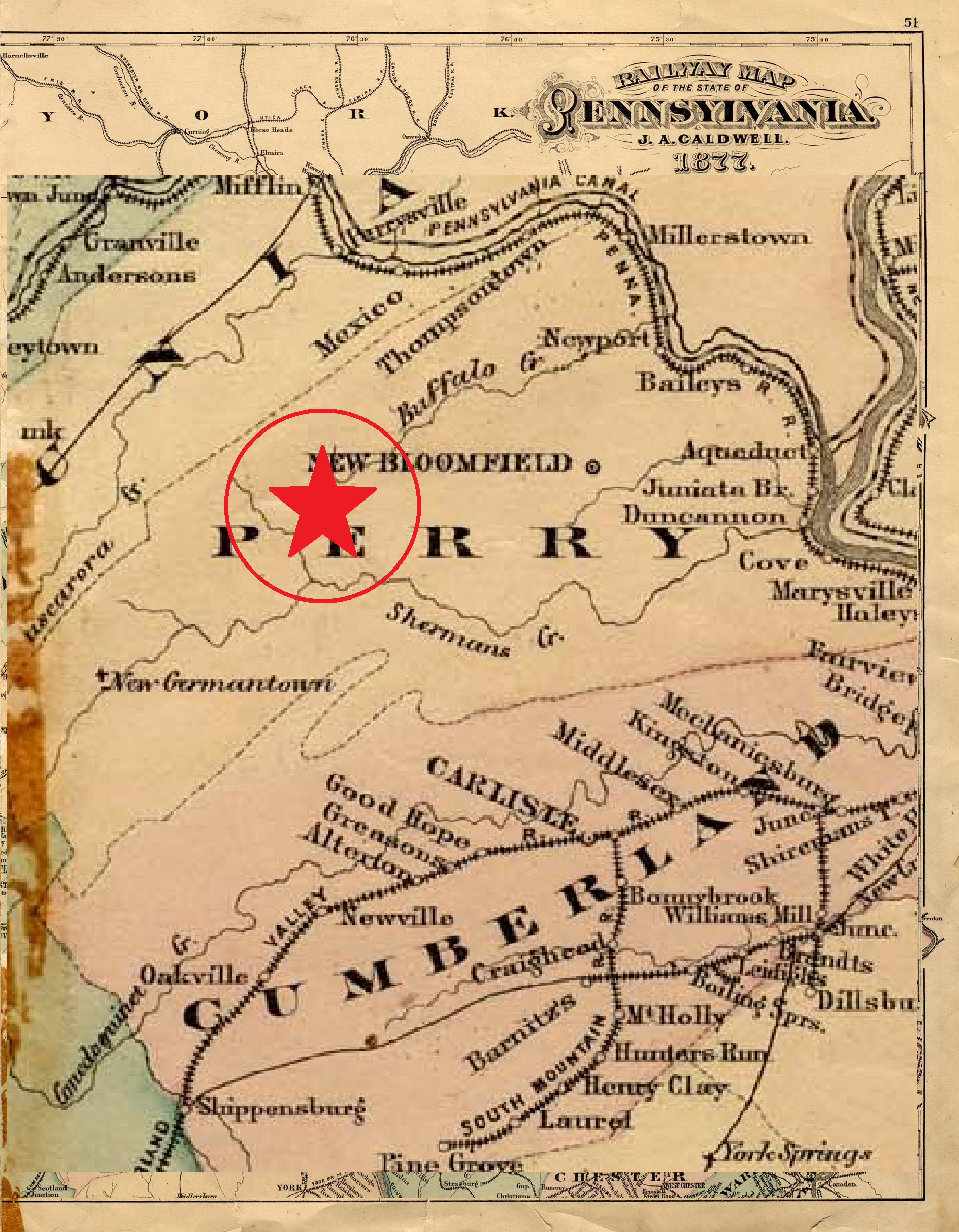
An 1877 map of Green Park

Green Park, an unincorporated village located in northeastern Tyrone Township, Perry County, Pennsylvania, United States, sits at the intersection of state routes 233 (Green Park Road) and 274 (Shermans Valley Road). The name was given to a local land tract by James Baxter in the late 1700s and made popular as an unofficial moniker for mid- to late-1800s picnic and camp meeting grounds (called Stambaugh's Woods, which lasted until 1896) located at the upper end of Stambaugh Farm Run. The town serves as Perry County's midpoint between the Conococheague Mountain in the west and the Susquehanna River to the east.

Given its central location, connection to a once-thriving wheelwright industry, historic one-room schoolhouse, and the West Perry (formerly Green Park Union) School District main campus, Green Park is unofficially nicknamed Perry County's "Hub of Education."

== Places of interest ==
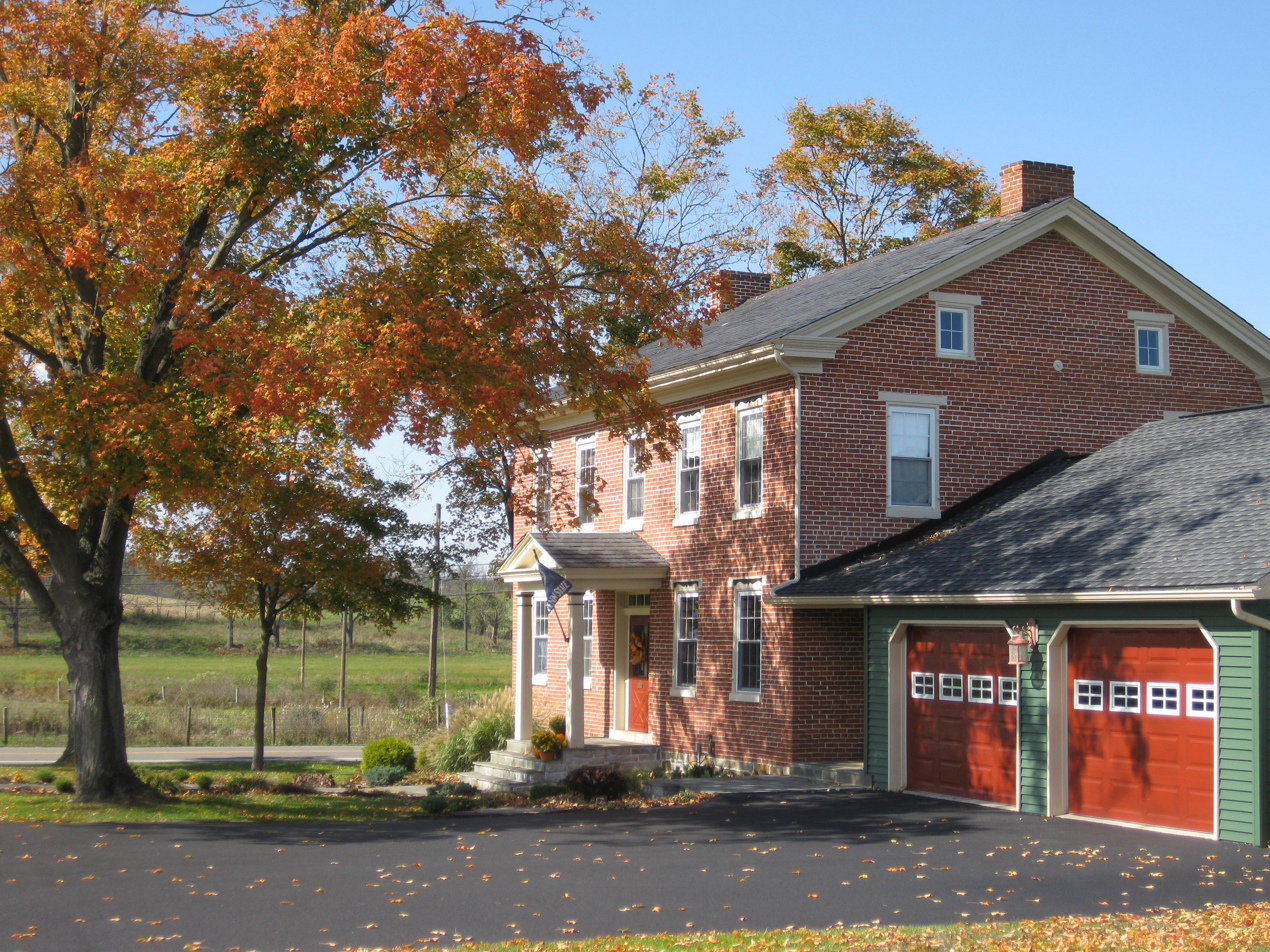
A Civil War-era farmhouse in Green Park

Notable landmarks within the historic environs of Green Park include West Perry High School (formerly Green Park Union High School) and West Perry Middle School (formerly Green Park Elementary School), the Elliottsburg/Green Park Post Office, Stone House Farm & Inn (owned by Hempfield Behavioral Health), Kingdom Grounds Cafe coffee house and bakery, and the Perry Mennonite Reception Center. Places of interest include Bernheisel’s Mill, an 18th-century cemetery on the site of the former Limestone Presbyterian Church, and the Green Park School House. Agriculture comprises the principal industry, with eight commercial dairy, beef, hog, or grain farms operating in the community.

== Municipal limits ==
Green Park comprises the northeastern corner of Tyrone Township. It is bisected from north to south by Pennsylvania Route 233 (Green Park Road) and east to west by Pennsylvania Route 274 (Shermans Valley Road). It is bordered on the east by the Tyrone Township-Spring Township line, the west by the village limits of Loysville, the north by the top of Limestone Ridge, and the south by Stonehouse Road. The main waterways include Montour Creek and Stambaugh Farm Run.

== History ==
=== 18th century ===
Alexander Roddy, who later built the initial grist mill in Perry County, Pennsylvania, was the first pioneer to live in what is now Green Park. He built a cabin of poles in the early 1750s by a spring on what later became the Stambaugh's Woods picnic and camp meeting grounds (now part of Green Pastures Farms). He was soon driven out with other squatters in the area due to pressure from local Indians. After the 1754 Treaty of Albany transferred lands in central Pennsylvania, including Perry County, from the Six Nations of the Iroquois Confederacy to John and Richard Penn Sr., Roddy returned, but to a new location.

In 1766, the Limestone Presbyterian Church, also known as the Lower Church or Sam Fisher's Church, was constructed at the bottom of Limestone Ridge on Dum Road in Green Park. It was abandoned in the early 1800s.

The western side of Green Park sits on a 530-acre tract warranted originally to Ludwig Laird in 1755, and surveyed to Henry Shoemaker in 1814. The eastern part lies on a tract of 50 acres warranted to Alexander Sanderson, who transferred it to John Henry Barnheisel (Bernheisel) on February 2, 1755. Soon thereafter, James Baxter warranted property east of Bernheisel's in the present location of West Perry High School, and named the tract "Green Park."

=== 19th century ===
Around 1857, Judge Martin and John Mootzer opened a store and post office in the center of the village (today the intersection of Routes 233 and 274). They were succeeded in the business by Frank Mortimer, George Ernest, William B. Keck, W.W. McClure, Samuel Stambaugh, George Bernheisel, William Hoobaugh, and Edgar A. Stambaugh (the establishment being known as Grange Store Company).

The first Green Park school emerged in 1815. Several log schools and brick ones were built over next 70 years, but all fell victim to fire. The historic one-room schoolhouse now standing on Green Park Road, maintained by the Historical Society of Perry County since 1969, operated from circa 1886 to 1954. The Green Park Union School District closed the one-room school after opening a new high school in Green Park and converting the Landisburg High School into an elementary school. The historic school building was totally refurbished for the Perry County bicentennial in 2020 and includes original desks and teaching materials. The school bell, cast by the Rheem & Brothers foundry in Green Park, can be heard during open houses held each summer.

In 1820, Green Park was one of the nine sites proposed for the Perry County seat. No houses were built in the village center until William Reed erected one in 1834.

John Henry Bernheisel opened a sawmill on his 330-acre farm circa 1790s; in 1832, his son Jacob (1801–1871) sold the sawmill to his brother Solomon (1808–1889). By 1835, Solomon had constructed a 3.5-story brick mill that processed hulled clover seed and ground sumac, a citrus-flavored spice, and a separate fulling mill and carding mill. The brick mill building still stands today, located on Pennsylvania Route 74, also known as Veterans Way.

In 1874, Solomon changed the works over to a grist mill; two years later he and worker Joseph Young patented a flour bolt that sifted bran from the flour to produce a lighter-weight product.

In 1878, he installed a steam engine (housed across the road) to run the facility, which continued in operation until the mid-1920s.

Jacob Bernheisel operated a machine shop and received U.S. Patent No. 72,783 for a corn sheller, separator and feeder on December 31, 1867. His son George (1829–1905) was a machinist and grain cradle maker. By 1860, another son Peter (1826–1905) owned an iron foundry, known as P. Bernheisel & Company, immediately to the west of the present historic Green Park School. In 1874, the foundry was purchased by John T. and David Rheem, operating as Rheem & Brothers, which manufactured the bell for the Green Park School.

Two tanneries were based in Green Park―the Titzell tannery, which operated until 1870; and the Fosselman (later Shearer) tannery, which stood as a private residence on Stonehouse Road until it was purchased by Hempfield Behavioral Health in January 2021 and became Stone House Farm & Inn.

W.W. McClure and later his son Robert ran a wagon wheel spoke factory in Green Park from the mid-1800s until approximately 1910.

During the Battle of Gettysburg, Green Park became a haven for refugees fleeing from the conflict. Bernheisel’s foundry and the McClure spoke factory were turned into repair depots for Union Army wagons damaged in the fight.

From 1893 to 1903, Green Park served as the site for a trestle that moved traffic on the standard-gauge Perry County Railroad, running from Duncannon to Landisburg, above the narrow-gauge Newport & Sherman’s Valley Railroad (N&SVR), that ran from a connection with the Pennsylvania Railroad in Newport west to New Germantown and first began serving Green Park in 1891.

=== 20th century ===
According to the 1910 census, the population of Green Park was 178. Green Park Grange No. 1615 was organized on May 27, 1914, by Edgar A. Stambaugh, with a Pomona Grange for the county established in Green Park on May 23, 1919. The Grange building, which closed in 1926, today has been turned into a private residence.

The Susquehanna River and Western Railroad acquired the bankrupt Perry County Railroad in 1903 and bankrupt N&SVR in 1920 and merged the two. By 1934, however, all rails west of New Bloomfield were removed. Five years later the railroad ceased operations.

== Notable person ==
Green Park is home to Pennsylvania State Representative Perry A. Stambaugh.

== Post Office ==
The United States Postal Service recognizes Green Park as a valid mailing address using the 17024 ZIP code. Green Park was previously assigned ZIP code 17031, which was officially retired on October 19, 2002, following closing of the physical Green Park Post Office on August 31, 1996. Green Park and the neighboring community of Elliottsburg now share a common post office and ZIP code.

== Resources ==
1. History of Perry County, Pennsylvania: Including Descriptions of Indians and Pioneer Life from the Time of Earliest Settlement (1922) by Harry Harrison Hain

2. Photos of threshing machines in action at Green Park

3. More on the Newport & Shermans Valley Railroad

4. Landisburg, Loysville and Green Park: Including Tresslertown and The Poor House (2017) by Dennis J. Hocker, PhD

== See also ==
- National Register of Historic Places listings in Perry County, Pennsylvania
