= Orviston, Pennsylvania =

Unincorporated community in Pennsylvania, US

- Census designated place
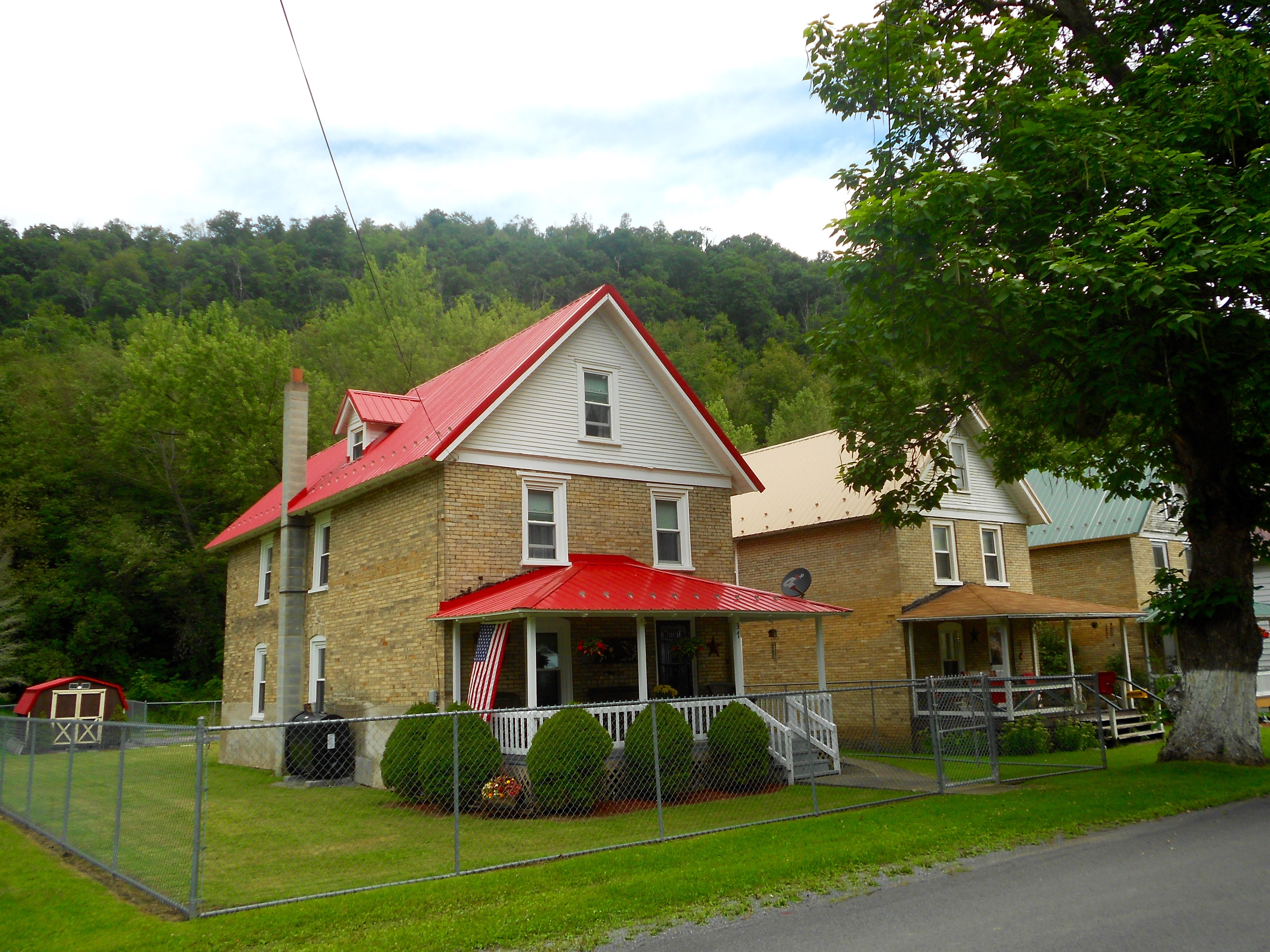
- Houses on Back Street

- Map showing Centre County in Pennsylvania

- Location in Pennsylvania Orviston (the United States)
- Coordinates: 41°6′22″N 77°45′10″W
- Country: United States
- State: Pennsylvania
- County: Centre
- Township: Curtin

Area
  - Total: 0.11 sq mi (0.28 km^{2})
  - Land: 0.11 sq mi (0.28 km^{2})
  - Water: 0 sq mi (0.00 km^{2})
- Elevation: 849 ft (259 m)

Population (2020)
  - Total: 64
  - Density: 597.5/sq mi (230.68/km^{2})
- Time zone: UTC-5 (Eastern (EST))
  - Summer (DST): UTC-4 (EDT)
- ZIP code: 16864
- FIPS code: 42-57160
- GNIS feature ID: 1183056

Orviston is an unincorporated community and census-designated place (CDP) in Curtin Township, Centre County, Pennsylvania, United States. As of the 2010 census, the population was 95. It is located in far northern Centre County, near the Clinton County border. Beech Creek runs through the center of the town, flowing southeast towards Bald Eagle Creek in the West Branch Susquehanna River watershed.

Orviston is known as the last town accessible by the Monument/Orviston road (formerly PA 364) - a 10.8-mile paved county road stemming from Beech Creek, Pennsylvania, and ending at the entrance to Orviston. Traffic can flow through Orviston, however, West on the Orviston-Kato road, South on the Orviston Mountain road to Romola and Marsh Creek, and North on the Dehass road to PA 144 N and E of Clarence. All are unpaved mountain roads. Formed prior to the mining boom, Orviston was so named in 1904 as replacement for its original name, Hayes Run, Pennsylvania, in honor of Judge Ellis Orvis, owner of the Orviston Fire Brick Company and President Judge of the 49th Judicial District of Pennsylvania. Judge Orvis owned a number of brick plants including the Centre Brick and Clay Company at the Western end of Orviston as well as the Snow Shoe Fire Brick Company in Snow Shoe among others. The now defunct Beech Creek Railroad - charted August 12, 1882 under the name Susquehanna and Southwestern Railroad which was absorbed by the New York Central Railroad which later became the Penn Central – ran through Orviston and its sister town, Monument, Pennsylvania, until the early 1960s.

== Demographics ==
Historical population
Census	Pop.	Note	%±
2020	64		—
U.S. Decennial Census

== Flooding ==
Orviston experienced damage to homes and properties during March 1936 ice flood as a result of two heavy storms hitting the northern United States. Excessive rainfall, coupled with melting snow, raised water levels in the Beech Creek stream by about 4 feet - a record breaking event at that time. There were no reported casualties in Orviston. In June 1972 the Beech Creek stream flooded again as a result of Hurricane Agnes dropping up to 30 inches of rainfall on Orviston and surrounding towns at a rate of 7 inches per hour during its peak. No casualties occurred during the Agnes flood and property damage was not significant or long lasting.

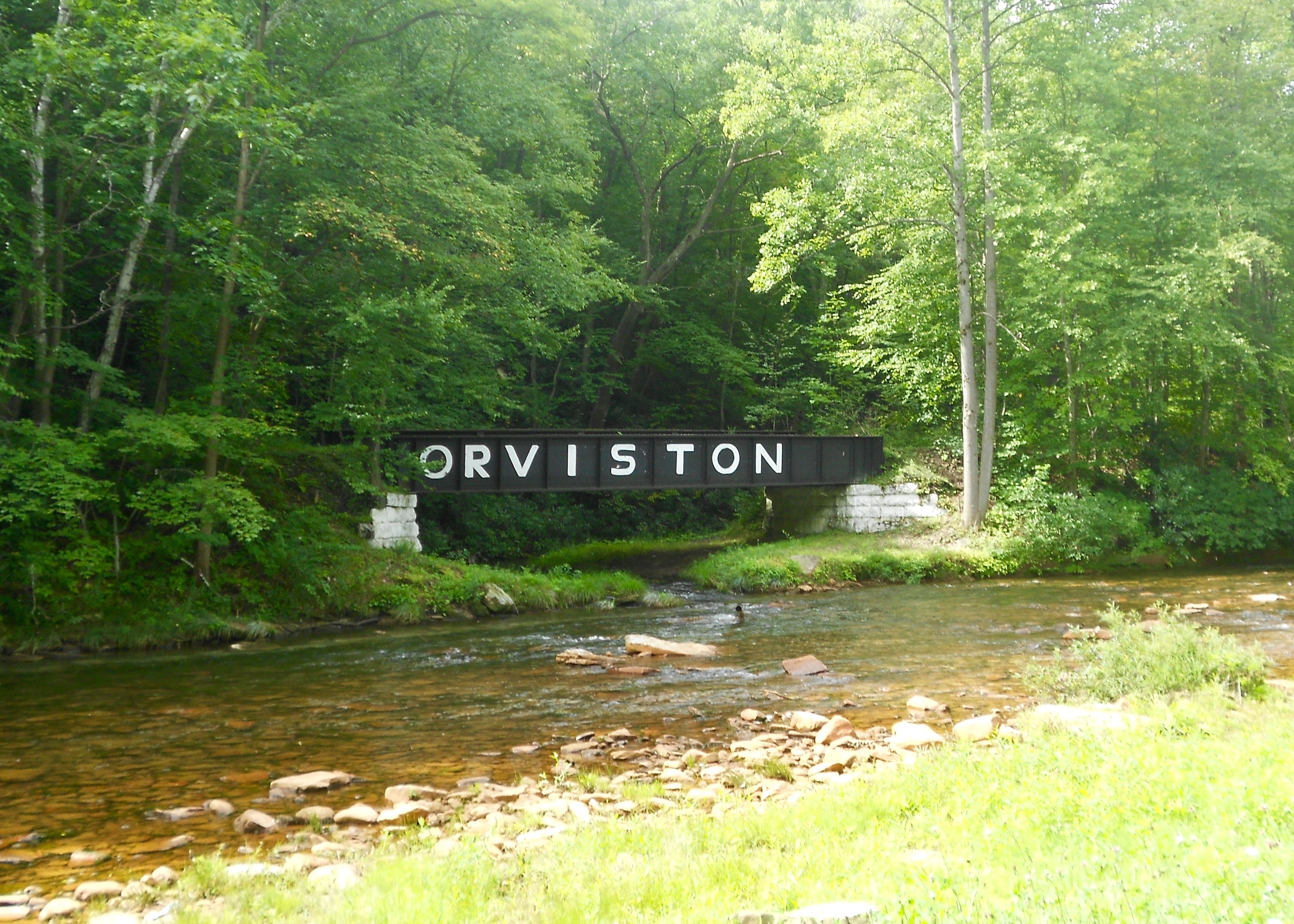
Old NYC RR railroad bridge over Hayes Run and flows into the Beech Creek stream at this location.

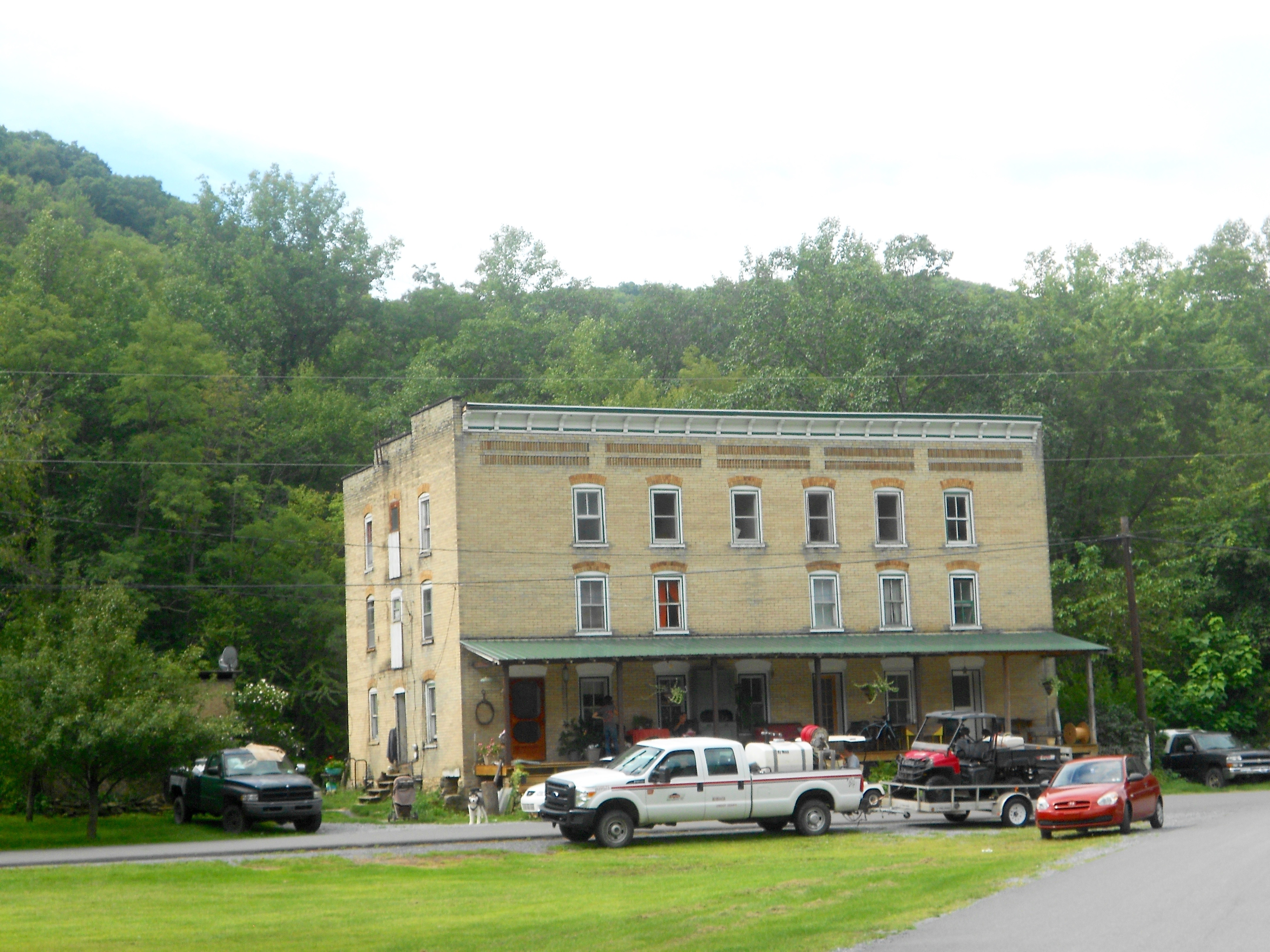
The largest building in town is what was originally known as The Creek Side Inn and later as the boarding house.

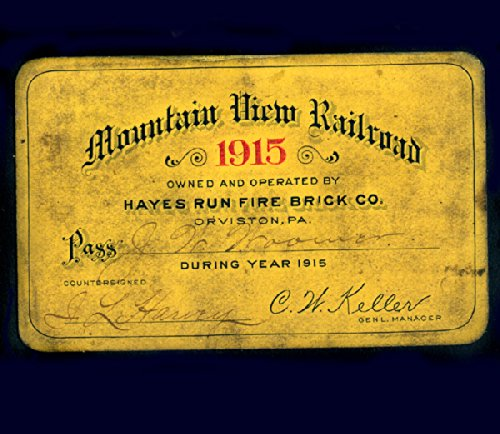
1915 Mountain View Railroad pass signed by J.L. Harvey and belonging to J.W. Woomer

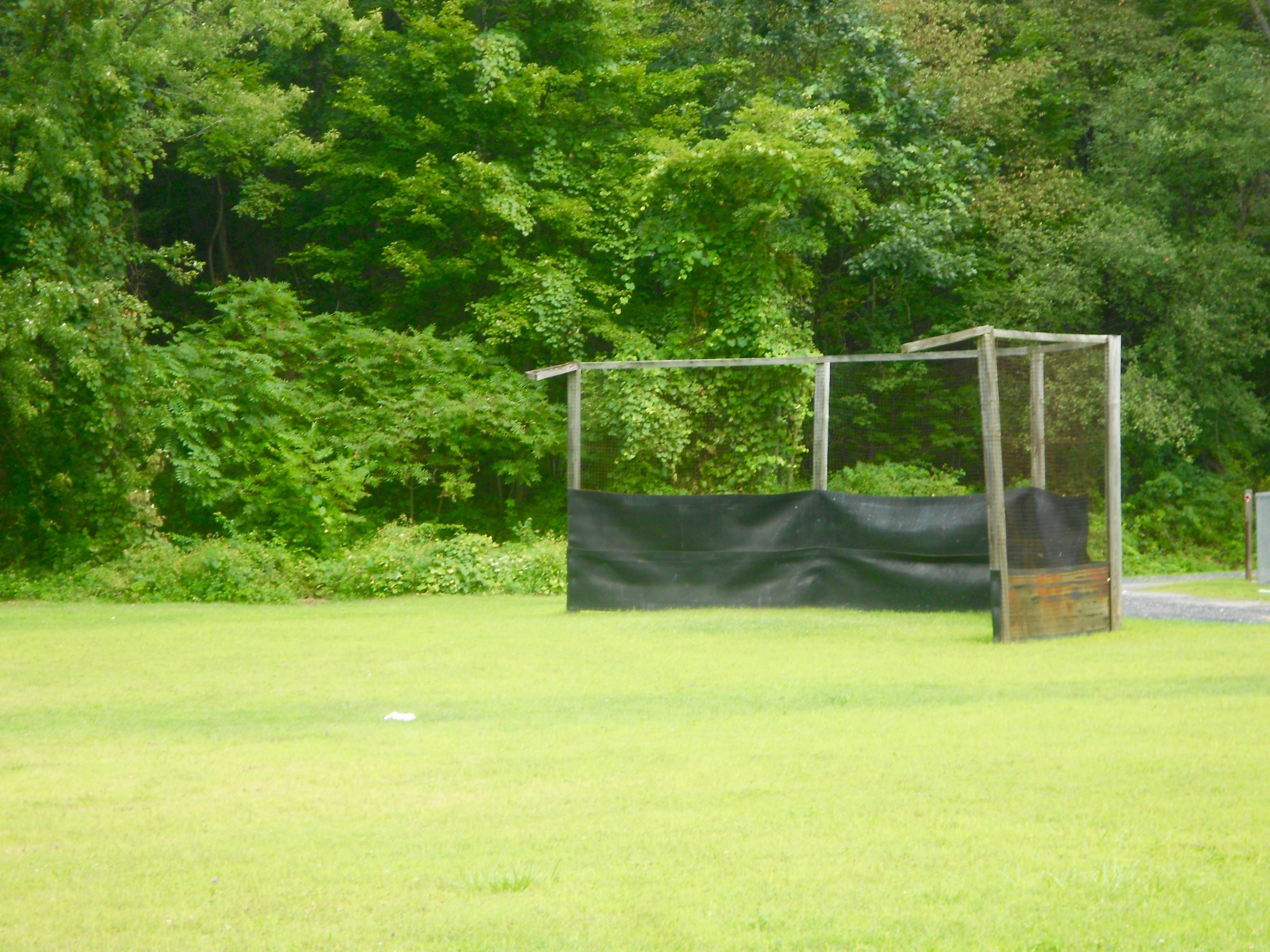
Baseball diamond

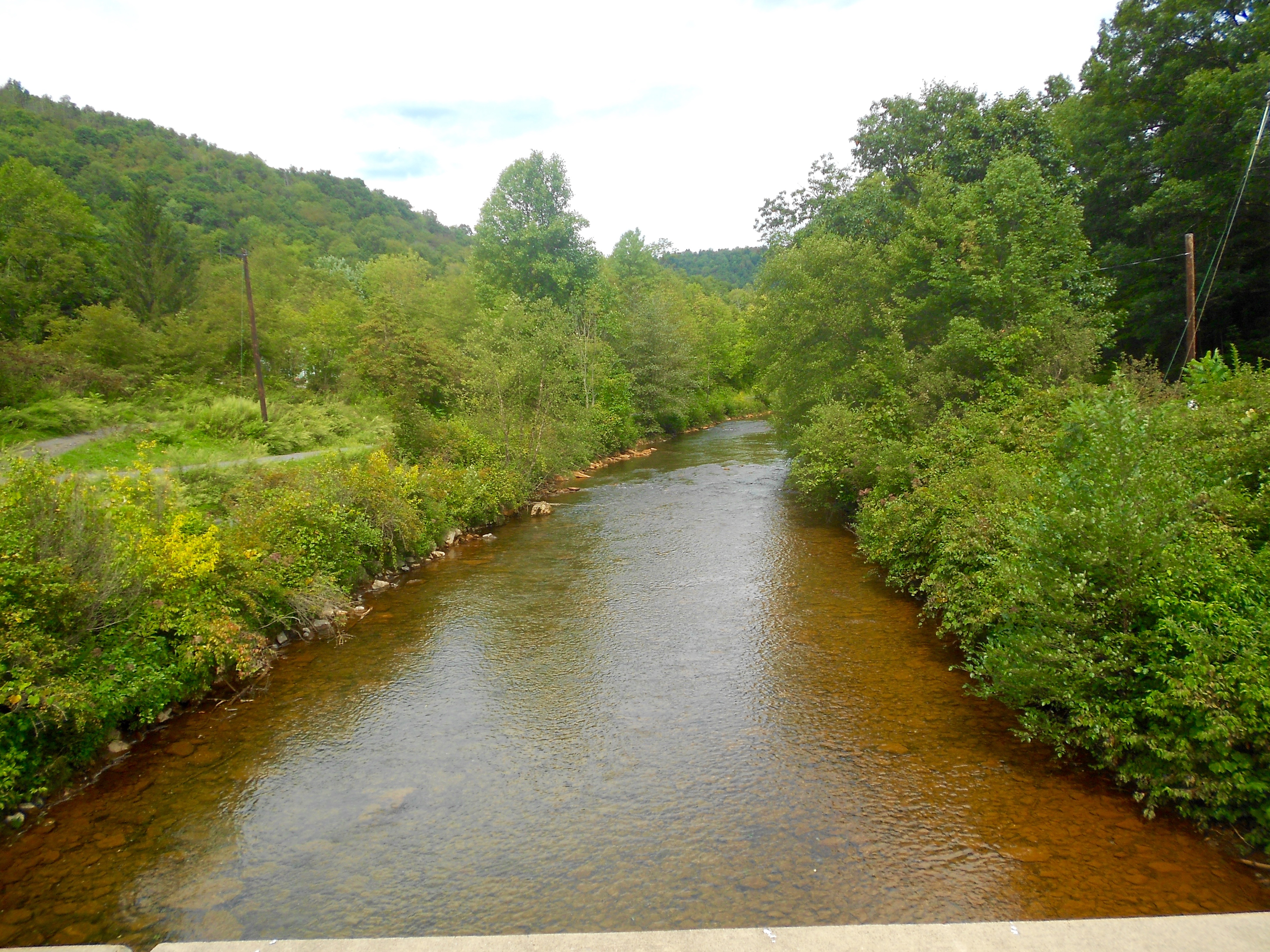
Beech Creek stream looking West (up stream) towards "Centrebrick".
