= Curtin Township, Pennsylvania =

Township in Pennsylvania, US

Coordinates: 41°05′00″N 77°46′59″W

- Township
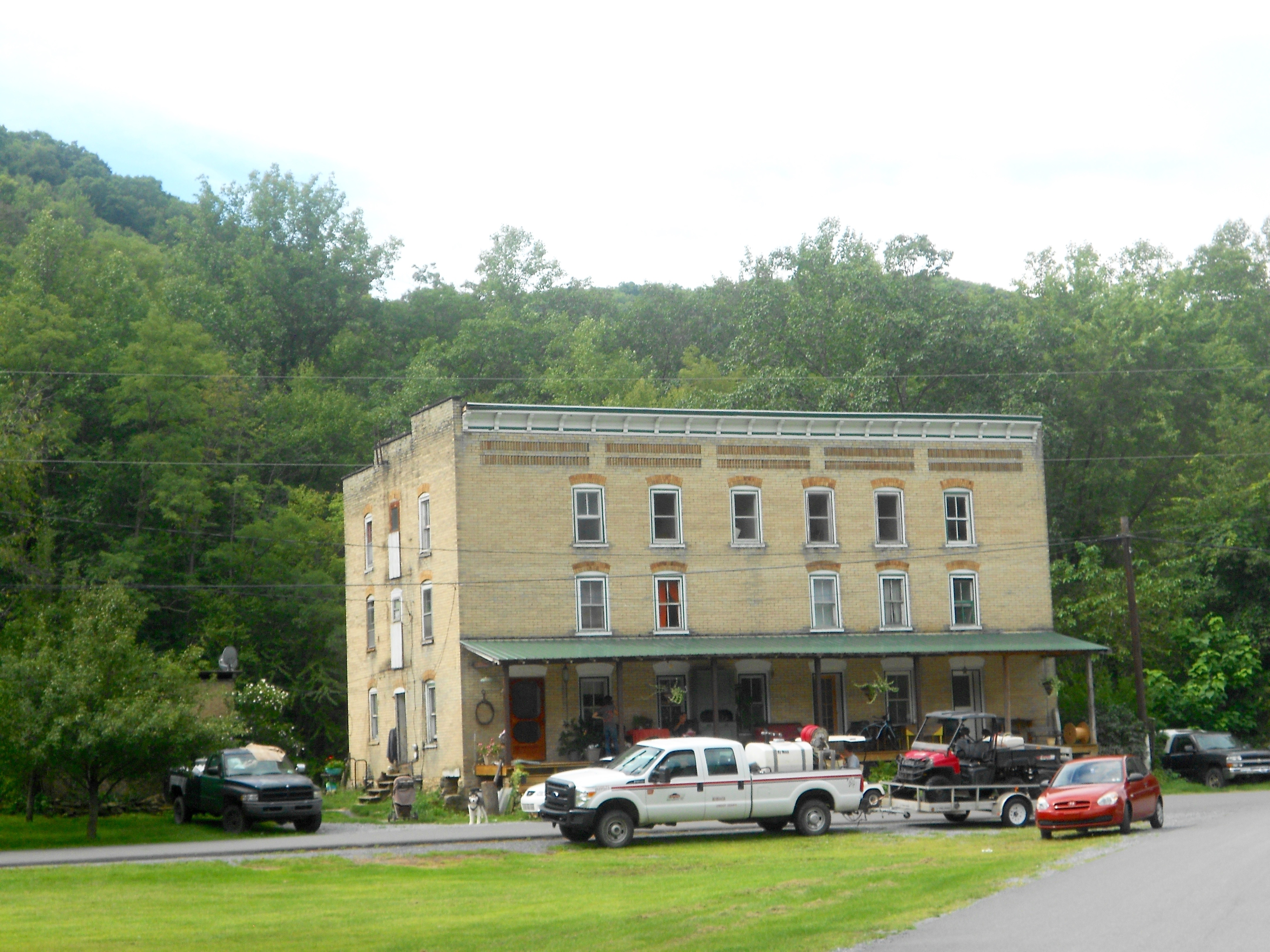
- Orviston

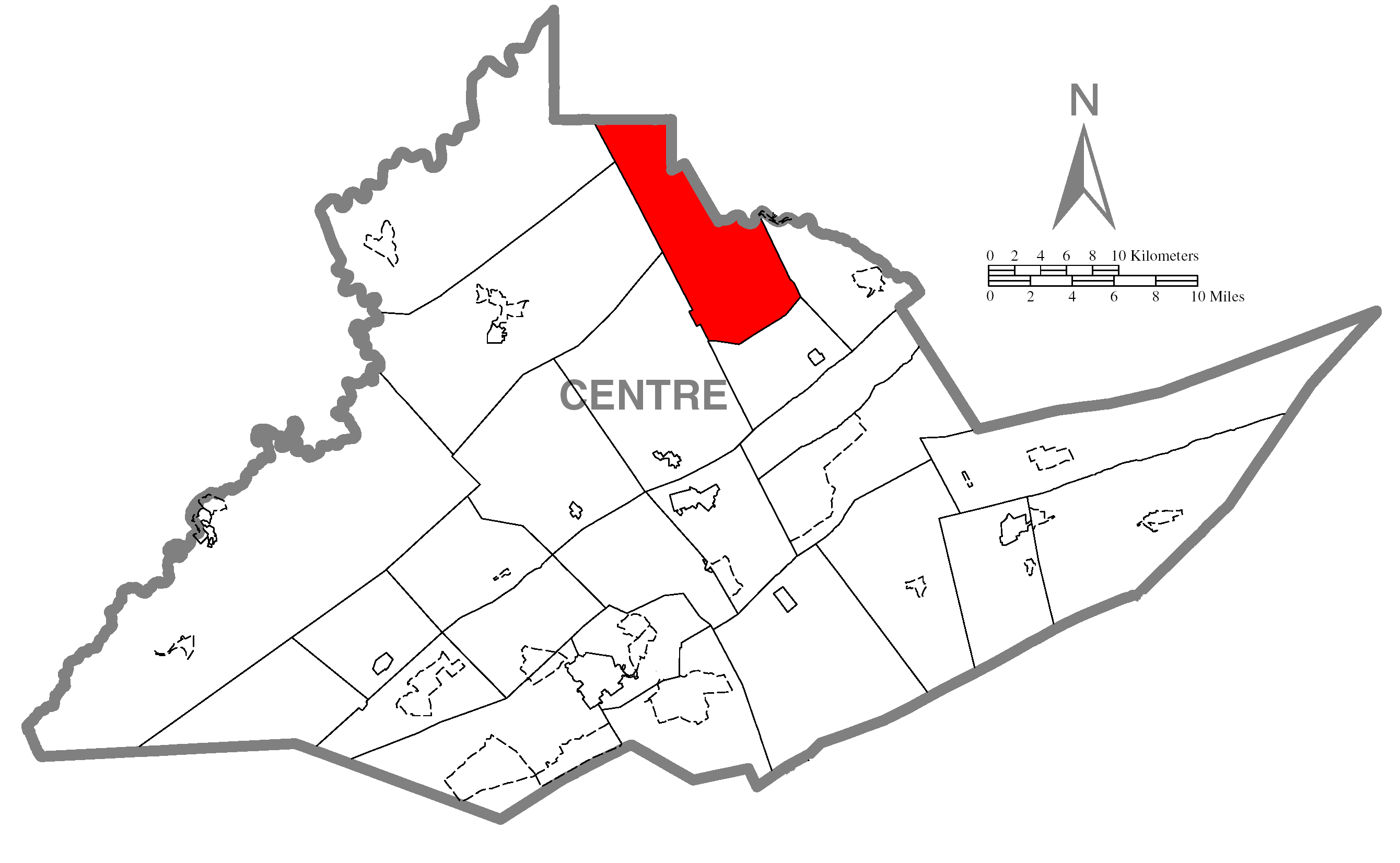
- Map of Centre County, Pennsylvania highlighting Curtin Township

- Map of Centre County, Pennsylvania
- Country: United States
- State: Pennsylvania
- County: Centre
- Settled: 1800
- Incorporated: 1857

Area
  - Total: 43.28 sq mi (112.10 km^{2})
  - Land: 43.28 sq mi (112.10 km^{2})
  - Water: 0 sq mi (0.00 km^{2})

Population (2020)
  - Total: 500 ▼
  - Estimate (2021): 494
  - Density: 13.8/sq mi (5.33/km^{2})
- Time zone: UTC-5 (EST)
  - Summer (DST): UTC-4 (EDT)
- FIPS code: 42-027-17800

Curtin Township is a township in Centre County, Pennsylvania, United States. It is part of the State College, Pennsylvania Metropolitan Statistical Area. The population was 500 at the 2020 census.

== Geography ==
According to the United States Census Bureau, the township has a total area of 43.3 square miles (112.1 km^{2}), all land.

Curtin Township is bordered by Clinton County to the north and east, Liberty Township to the east, Howard Township to the south and Boggs, Show Shoe and Burnside townships to the west.

The township contains the census-designated place of Orviston.

== Demographics ==
Historical population
Census	Pop.	Note	%±
2000	551		—
2010	618		12.2%
2020	500		−19.1%
2021 (est.)	494		−1.2%
U.S. Decennial Census

As of the census of 2000, there were 551 people, 207 households, and 162 families residing in the township. The population density was 12.5 people per square mile (4.8/km^{2}). There were 339 housing units at an average density of 7.7/sq mi (3.0/km^{2}). The racial makeup of the township was 99.27% White, 0.18% Native American, and 0.54% from two or more races. Hispanic or Latino of any race were 0.18% of the population.

There were 207 households, out of which 30.9% had children under the age of 18 living with them, 64.7% were married couples living together, 9.2% had a female householder with no husband present, and 21.7% were non-families. 18.8% of all households were made up of individuals, and 7.2% had someone living alone who was 65 years of age or older. The average household size was 2.66 and the average family size was 3.06.

In the township the population was spread out, with 23.8% under the age of 18, 6.2% from 18 to 24, 34.3% from 25 to 44, 21.1% from 45 to 64, and 14.7% who were 65 years of age or older. The median age was 38 years. For every 100 females there were 112.7 males. For every 100 females aged 18 and over, there were 104.9 males.

The median income for a household in the township was $32,188, and the median income for a family was $35,875. Males had a median income of $27,500 versus $21,136 for females. The per capita income for the township was $12,649. About 10.3% of families and 9.8% of the population were below the poverty line, including 13.3% of those under age 18 and 14.3% of those age 65 or over.
