= Spring Township, Perry County, Pennsylvania =

Township in Pennsylvania, US

Coordinates: 40°20′00″N 77°15′59″W

- Township
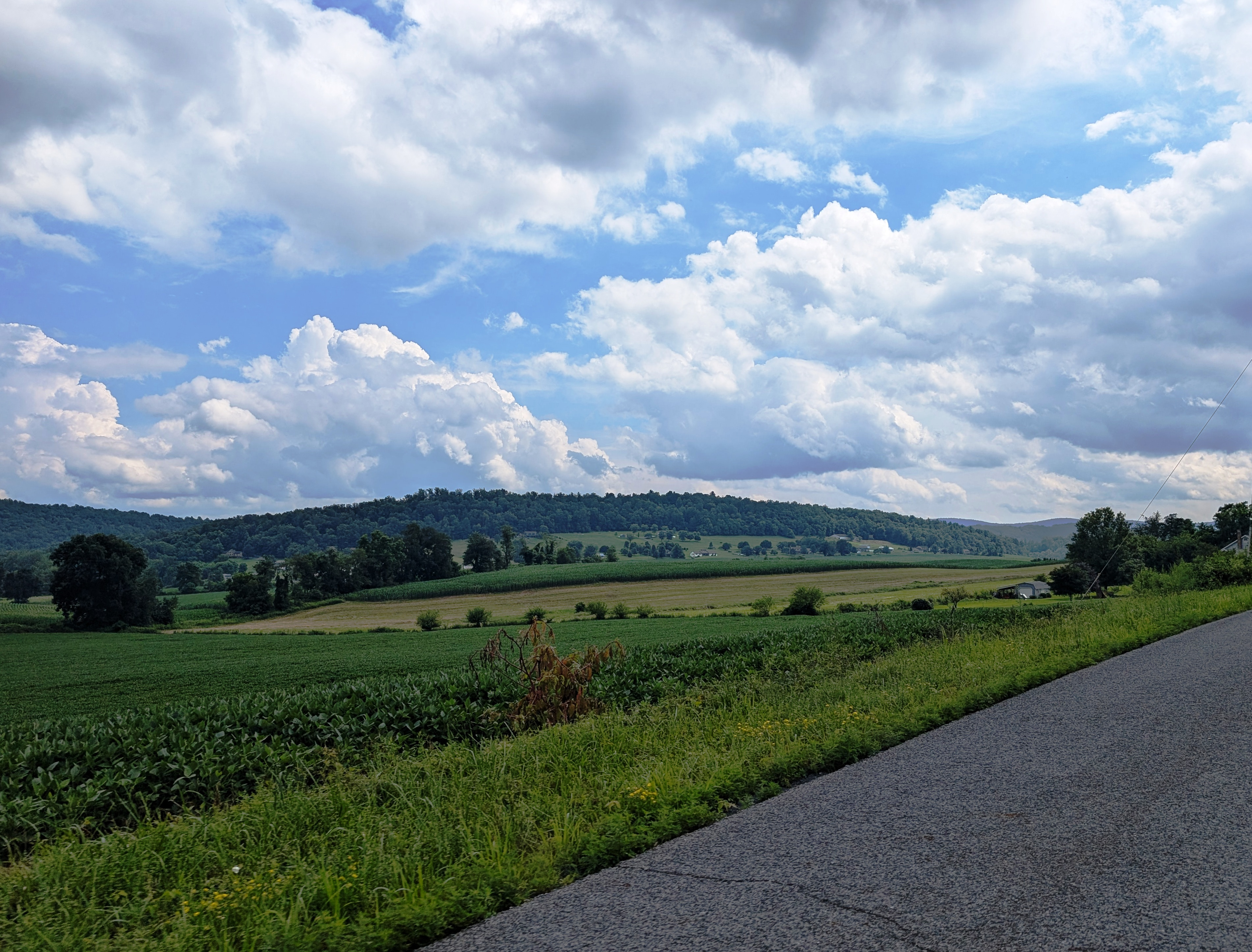
- Farmland in Spring Township off Paige Hill Road

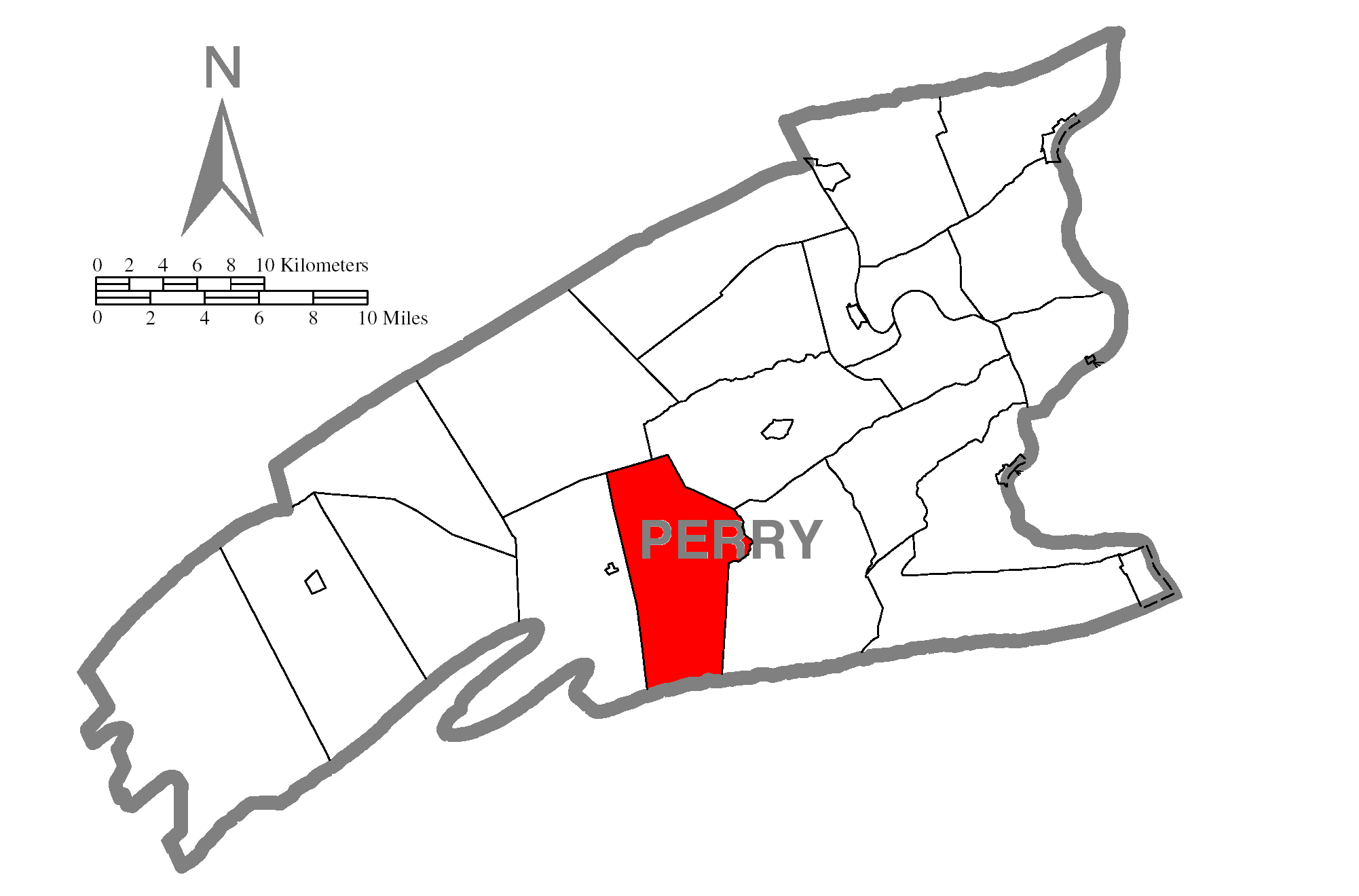
- Map of Perry County, Pennsylvania highlighting Spring Township

- Map of Perry County, Pennsylvania
- Country: United States
- State: Pennsylvania
- County: Perry
- Settled: 1755
- Incorporated: 1848

Area
  - Total: 28.81 sq mi (74.63 km^{2})
  - Land: 28.64 sq mi (74.17 km^{2})
  - Water: 0.17 sq mi (0.45 km^{2})

Population (2020)
  - Total: 2,294 ▲
  - Estimate (2023): 2,311
  - Density: 77.4/sq mi (29.88/km^{2})
- Time zone: UTC-5 (Eastern (EST))
  - Summer (DST): UTC-4 (EDT)
- Area code: 717
- FIPS code: 42-099-72848
- Website: https://www.springtwp.org/

Spring Township is a township in Perry County, Pennsylvania, United States. The population was 2,294 at the 2020 census.

== Geography ==
According to the United States Census Bureau, the township has a total area of 28.8 square miles (74.7 km^{2}), all land.

== Demographics ==
Historical population
Census	Pop.	Note	%±
2010	2,208		—
2020	2,294		3.9%
2023 (est.)	2,311		0.7%
U.S. Decennial Census

As of the census of 2000, there were 2,021 people, 746 households, and 595 families living in the township. The population density was 70.1 inhabitants per square mile (27.1/km^{2}). There were 815 housing units at an average density of 28.3 per square mile (10.9/km^{2}). The racial makeup of the township was 98.71% White, 0.30% African American, 0.20% Native American, 0.20% Asian, 0.20% from other races, and 0.40% from two or more races. Hispanic or Latino of any race were 0.40% of the population.

There were 746 households, out of which 36.6% had children under the age of 18 living with them, 70.6% were married couples living together, 5.4% had a female householder with no husband present, and 20.2% were non-families. 16.4% of all households were made up of individuals, and 7.2% had someone living alone who was 65 years of age or older. The average household size was 2.71 and the average family size was 3.04.

In the township the population was spread out, with 27.7% under the age of 18, 5.9% from 18 to 24, 30.5% from 25 to 44, 25.8% from 45 to 64, and 10.1% who were 65 years of age or older. The median age was 36 years. For every 100 females, there were 99.5 males. For every 100 females age 18 and over, there were 98.1 males.

The median income for a household in the township was $48,594, and the median income for a family was $53,083. Males had a median income of $32,355 versus $26,979 for females. The per capita income for the township was $19,644. About 5.1% of families and 7.5% of the population were below the poverty line, including 8.6% of those under age 18 and 17.5% of those age 65 or over.
