= Perry A. Stambaugh =

Republican politician

Member of the Pennsylvania House of Representatives from the 86th district
- Incumbent
- Assumed office January 5, 2021
- Preceded by: Mark Keller

Personal details
- Born: March 8, 1960 (age 66) Harrisburg, Pennsylvania, U.S.
- Party: Republican
- Spouse: Married
- Children: Garrett Stambaugh; Griffin Stambaugh
- Education: Penn State University
- Occupation: Magazine editor and farmer
- Website: repperrystambaugh.com

Perry A. Stambaugh (born March 8, 1960) is a Republican member of the Pennsylvania House of Representatives, District 86. He first took office following the 2020 Pennsylvania House of Representatives election.

Stambaugh graduated from Penn State University and operates a family farm in Green Park in Perry County, Pennsylvania. He supports measures to improve deployment of high-speed Internet to rural areas, as well as state constitutional reforms, such as electing state appellate judges on a district (not statewide) basis and eliminating property taxes to fund schools. He also backs state legislative and congressional term limits.

== Career ==
Before running for the state House, Stambaugh spent most of his nearly 40-year professional career as a rural and agricultural magazine editor on local, statewide, and national levels—notably with the former Pennsylvania Farmer magazine (now American Agriculturist); Penn Lines magazine, published by the Pennsylvania Rural Electric Association; and RE Magazine, produced by the National Rural Electric Cooperative Association.

In the 2025-26 legislative session, Stambaugh sits on the House Agriculture and Rural Affairs, Energy, Finance, and Transportation committees, including as Republican vice chairman of the Energy Committee and Republican chairman of the Transportation Subcommittee on Public Transportation. He was a founding member of the Pennsylvania Freedom Caucus.
