= Path Valley Railroad =

Overview
- Dates of operation: 1893–1895 (paper railroad)

Technical
- Track gauge: 3 ft (914 mm)

The Path Valley Railroad was a proposed 3 ft (914 mm) narrow gauge railroad in Perry and Franklin Counties, Pennsylvania, USA.

Intended as an extension of the Newport and Shermans Valley Railroad, it was to begin at that railroad's terminus in New Germantown and run southward along Shermans Creek and Big Spring Run. Around what is now Big Spring State Forest Picnic Area, the line would climb through a series of curves on a 4% grade and pass through a 2,600 feet (790 m) tunnel under Conococheague Mountain named Conococheague Mountain Tunnel to bring it into Burns Valley. It would run down Burns Valley into Path Valley and through the town of Doylesburg, ending at Fannettsburg. An extension through the Concord Narrows was also contemplated, which could have connected to the East Broad Top Railroad and the Tuscarora Valley Railroad.

Incorporated on October 24, 1893, grading began almost immediately. The line was graded for 4 ft 8 1/2 in (1,435 mm) standard gauge, with the anticipation that the N&SV would be converted from 3 ft (914 mm) gauge. The grade soon reached Conococheague Mountain, and construction began on both portals of the tunnel. However, the rock formations of the mountain proved much more difficult to excavate than expected, and the tunnel contractor went bankrupt in September 1894 after excavating about 100 feet (30 m) at both ends. Most of the remaining grading was completed, but the tunnel proved impractically difficult to complete, and the railroad was given up as a failure in 1895.

Part of the grade from New Germantown to Big Spring was later used by the Perry Lumber Company for a 3 ft (914 mm) gauge logging railroad from 1900 to 1905. Much of the grading is now preserved as hiking trails in Big Spring State Forest Picnic Area and Tuscarora State Forest. The north portal of the tunnel is still visible, but fenced off.
