= Conococheague Mountain Tunnel =

Proposed railroad tunnel in Pennsylvania, US

Coordinates: 40.2644°N 77.6508°W

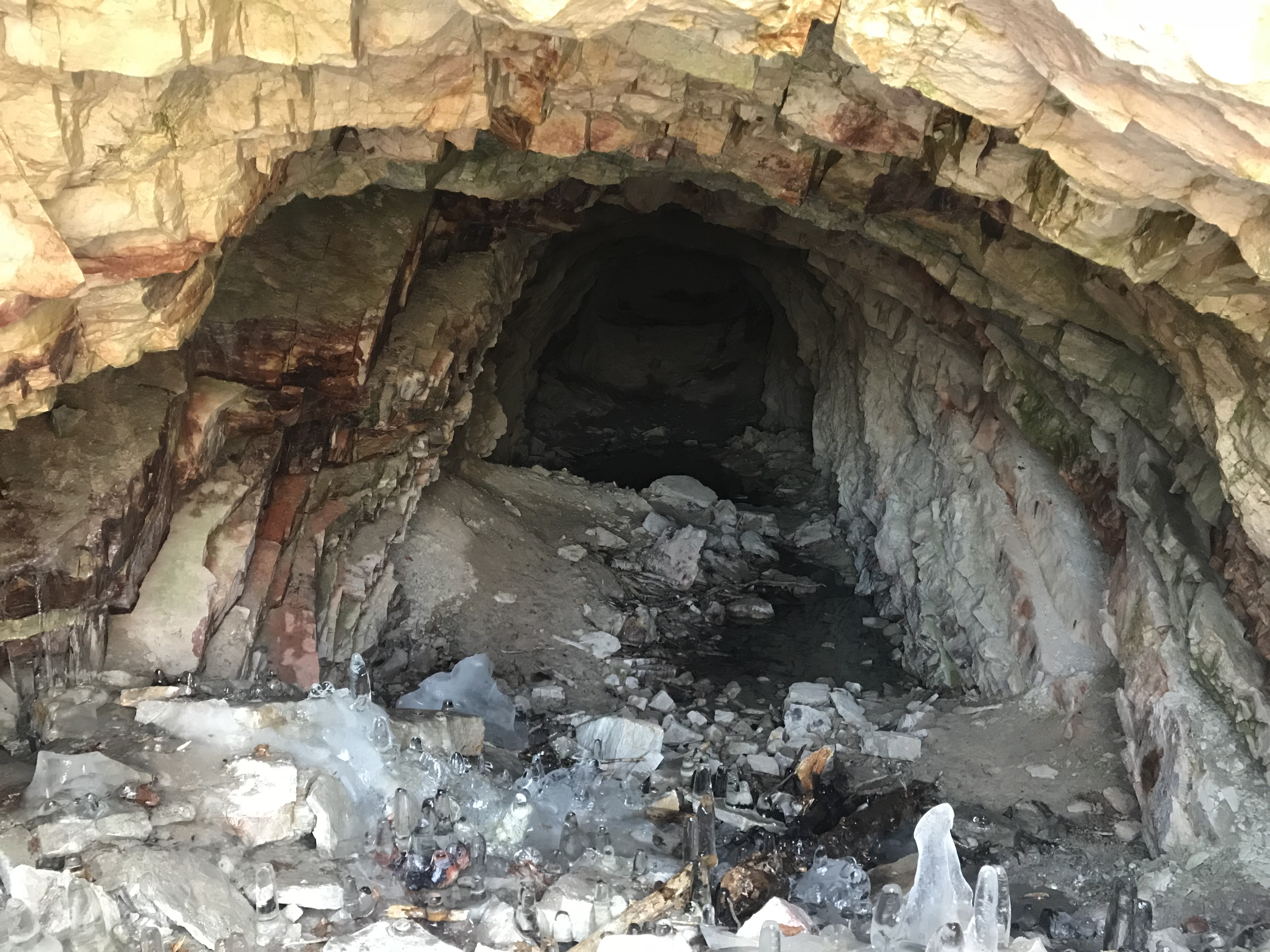
- View inside uncompleted Conococheague Mountain Tunnel

Overview
- Location: Perry County, Pennsylvania
- Status: never completed
- System: Path Valley Railroad
- Start: 1894
- End: abandoned 1895

Technical
- Length: 2600 feet planned, about 200 feet completed
- Track gauge: 3 ft (914 mm)

The Conococheague Mountain Tunnel was a proposed railroad tunnel in Perry County, Pennsylvania. It was originally planned as part of the Path Valley Railroad, with the intent to link the Newport and Shermans Valley Railroad with the East Broad Top Railroad and the Tuscarora Valley Railroad further west. Only about 100 feet of either end of the planned 2600 foot tunnel was completed in 1894. The partially completed tunnel exists in Big Spring State Forest Picnic Area and Tuscarora State Forest. The north portal of the tunnel is still visible, but fenced off.

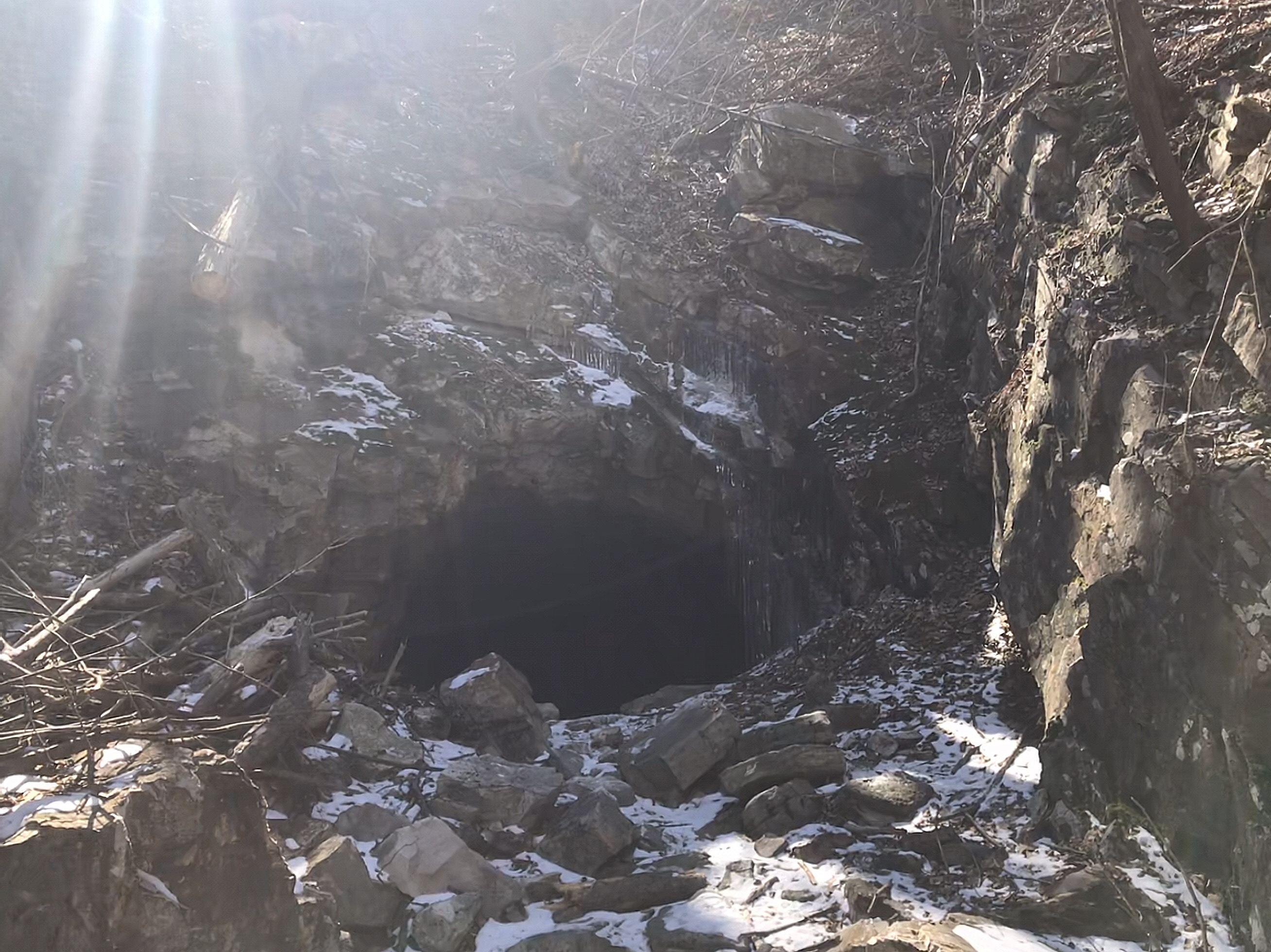
Uncompleted Conococheague Mountain Tunnel
