= Big Spring State Park (Pennsylvania) =

State park in Perry County, Pennsylvania

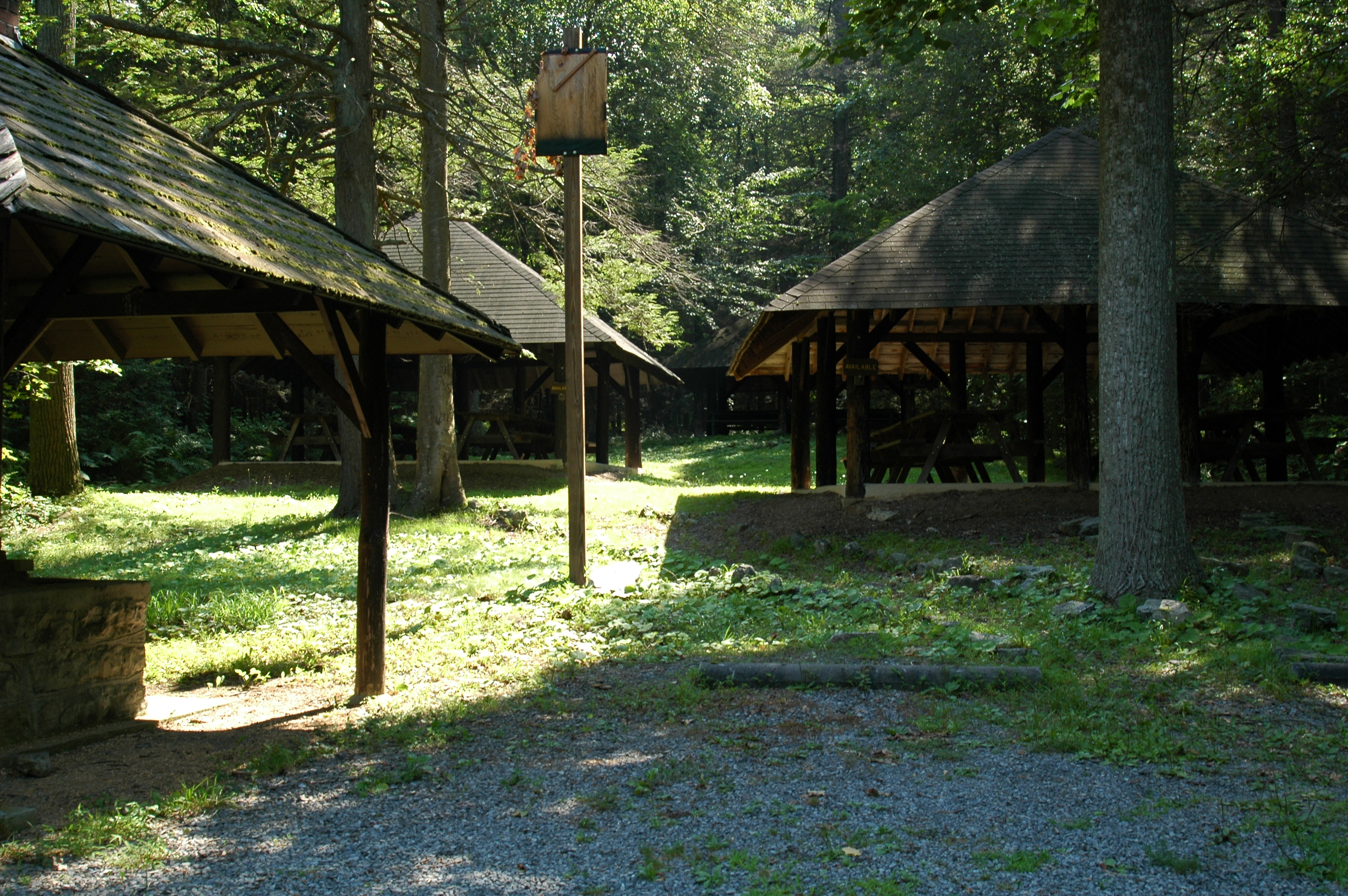
- Pavilions in a wooded area at Big Spring State Park

- Location within Pennsylvania Location within the United States
- Interactive map of Big Spring State Park
- Location: Toboyne Township, Perry County, Pennsylvania, United States
- Coordinates: 40°15′43″N 77°39′41″W
- Area: 45 acres (18 ha)
- Elevation: 1,375 ft (419 m)
- Established: 1936
- Administrator: Pennsylvania Department of Conservation and Natural Resources
- Named for: Big Spring Run
- Website: Official website
- Pennsylvania State Parks

Big Spring State Park is a 45-acre (18 ha) Pennsylvania state park in Toboyne Township, Perry County, Pennsylvania in the United States. The park is on Pennsylvania Route 274, 5.5 miles (8.9 km) southwest of New Germantown. Big Spring State Park is a hiking and picnic area. A partially completed railroad tunnel in Conococheague Mountain is a feature of the park.

== History ==
The area surrounding Big Spring State Park is now largely a wild area. This was not the case in the 19th century. One of the first businesses at the foot of Conococheague Mountain was a tannery. This tannery was in operation from the early 19th century until 1860. The tannery was converted into an axe handle factory in 1871. The Perry Lumber Railroad, a narrow gauge railway also operated in the area. It hauled lumber to tanneries, barrel manufacturers and charcoal furnaces.

The abandoned railroad tunnel is a remnant of the lumber era that dominated the economy of much of Pennsylvania in the 19th century. The Newport and Shermans Valley Railroad extended its line into the Big Spring area in an attempt to connect with the Path Valley Railroad on the other side of Conococheague Mountain in Franklin County. This tunnel was left incomplete and stands as a reminder of the lumber/railroad era.

Although the railroad may have failed in its effort to tunnel through the mountain, the tracks remained. These rails were used to transport picnickers into the area during the early 20th century. The current facilities at Big Spring State Park were built during the Great Depression in the 1930s by the Civilian Conservation Corps. It was formally opened in 1936.

== Recreation ==
Big Spring State Park offers recreational opportunities to those interested in picnicking and hiking. The pavilions built by the CCC and picnic tables are available in many areas of the park. A one-mile trail leads to the abandoned railroad tunnel in Conococheague Mountain. The park also serves as a trailhead for the Iron Horse Trail in Tuscarora State Forest.
