= Tuscarora Valley Railroad =

Overview
- Headquarters: Port Royal, Pennsylvania
- Locale: Pennsylvania
- Dates of operation: 1891–1934
- Successor: abandoned

Technical
- Track gauge: 3 ft (914 mm)

The Tuscarora Valley Railroad was a 3 ft (914 mm) narrow gauge short-line railroad that operated in central Pennsylvania from 1891 to 1934.

== Construction and plans for extension ==
The TVRR was chartered in April 1891 to build from a junction with the Pennsylvania Railroad at Port Royal to points south. Concord and Dry Run, in Franklin County, seem to have been the southern termini originally contemplated.

The principal promoter of the new railroad was Thomas S. Moorhead. Moorhead had made a fortune mining phosphate rock in Florida in the late 1880s, and had previously been involved in promoting the Susquehanna and Southwest Railway during the early 1880s. It appears that he intended the TVRR as an outlet for phosphate deposits located at Ross Farm, along the Tuscarora Creek. Local financial backing was provided by John M. Blair. His father, John H. Blair, had founded Blairs Mills, high up the Tuscarora Creek. John M. was a storekeeper and a wealthy pillar of the community.

The TVRR was surveyed along the east side of the valley, against the edge of Tuscarora Mountain. Grading began in the summer of 1892 and the railroad was finished from Port Royal to East Waterford on February 1, 1893. Here a temporary halt to construction occurred, possibly due to the straitened financial conditions during the Panic of 1893. The use of narrow gauge may have been a measure of economy, as well; on the other hand, the gauge was a popular one with several nearby short lines, such as the East Broad Top Railroad. The railroad shop was temporarily housed in the basement of a grist mill in East Waterford, and a turntable was built there.

The announcement of the Path Valley Railroad in late 1893 temporarily balked plans for a southward extension of the TVRR through Concord Narrows into Franklin County. However, by early 1894, the TVRR had begun selling bonds to finance a further southward extension. In April 1895, grading was finished between East Waterford and Blairs Mills, and regular service began in late 1895. The new extension passed by Ross Farm, and in early 1896, Moorhead made the first public announcement of the phosphate deposits there and his formation of the Pennsylvania Phosphate Company to exploit them. Two miles of grading had also been done between Concord and Dry Run.

The initial workings at Ross Farm were apparently successful, as Moorhead erected a larger processing plant in 1898. At 310 feet (94 m) long, 156 feet (48 m) wide, and five stories high, it is believed to be the largest commercial building ever built in Juniata County, and had a capacity of 30 short tons (27 t) per day. To supply this plant, Moorhead planned to tap other local lime deposits, and reportedly surveyed a rail line from Honey Grove to Reeds Gap. However, fertilizer traffic would prove ephemeral for the TVRR. The remainder of the phosphate deposits proved too poor to process efficiently, the plant's output dropping from 2,000 short tons (1,800 t) of fertilizer in 1899 to 900 short tons (820 t) in 1900. The company ceased operation in 1904, a great blow to Moorhead and the TVRR, which was now dependent on lumber and local agricultural traffic.

The railroad's directors continued to contemplate extension. An extensive plan was conceived in January 1897. At the north end, the railroad would extend to Mifflin, cross the Juniata River to Mifflintown, and follow the Selinsgrove and North Branch Railroad's defunct grade to Selinsgrove. To the south, the line would be extended from Blairs Mills to Burnt Cabins and McConnellsburg, and then south to Hancock, Maryland and the Baltimore and Ohio Railroad. The extensions would be built to 4 ft 8 1/2 in (1,435 mm) standard gauge, and the railroad itself converted.

Such a plan was far beyond the resources of the TVRR and would have required considerable external investment. As part of the program for doing so, a separate corporation, the Tuscarora Railroad, was chartered in January 1898 to build the southern extension from Blairs Mills to McConnellsburg. Considerable grading was done during 1898, and was supposed to be complete to Neelyton by November, with bridges constructed as far south as Nossville. Grading was finished to Burnt Cabins by the end of the year, possibly using some of the grade from the East Broad Top's branch to reach the South Pennsylvania Railroad. However, no further work was ever done by the company. In 1919, the whole Tuscarora Railroad right-of-way was sold to the East Broad Top for the construction of their Stanton Rock Spur, and the Tuscarora Railroad's charter eventually expired.

== Lumber era ==
With the collapse of phosphate production, lumber rapidly replaced it as the principal freight of the railroad. It peaked in 1900, when the Tuscarora Valley hauled 16,024 short tons (14,537 t) of lumber, and remained high for many years, exceeding other traffic in weight by as much as five to one. Small lumbering operations in the hills surrounding the valley cut timber into mine props, barrel staves, railroad ties, tool handles, and other finished lumber, which was then hauled to the railroad and loaded on cars. Shipping points included Honey Grove, East Waterford (the location of Martin's stave mill), and Blairs Mills. The railroad's J.M. Blair was a lumber broker in the latter community, buying and selling lumber from a number of the local loggers and shipping it over the railroad.

The other major lumber broker on the line was Henry Clay Hower, whose large lumberyard in Port Royal received much of the TVRR's traffic. Hower supplied ties and other lumber to the Pennsylvania Railroad. Besides finished lumber, the railroad also shipped tanbark to Port Royal, to be used by the Oak Extract Company in nearby Newport. In 1899, it was rumored that the Oak Extract Company would build a new connection from the Newport and Shermans Valley Railroad to Honey Grove and abandon the TVRR north of there, making it a feeder for tanning operations, but this plan never came to fruition. Some of the timber logged in the valley probably also went to the old Ross Farm phosphate plant, which was converted to the mill of the Nemo Paper Company in 1904, but it only operated for a few years.

In 1905, the East Waterford Lumber Company erected a sawmill, a double stave mill, and a lath mill on the southwest edge of East Waterford. The company owned timber lands in Kansas Valley and Horse Valley, south and east of the town, and chartered its own logging railroad, the East Waterford and Kansas Valley Railroad, to bring timber to the company's mills. The company's railroad, built with the used rails and equipment of the Perry Lumber Company, was constructed to the same gauge as the Tuscarora Valley, to which it connected. The sawmill, with a capacity of 30,000 board feet per day, was relatively small when compared to its contemporaries elsewhere in Pennsylvania. However, it was sufficient for the East Waterford operation, which shipped over the Tuscarora Valley until 1908. At that time, the logging railroad and facility were sold, dismantled, and shipped to the Midlothian, Maryland operation of the Juniata Lumber Company, co-owned by Hower.

== New York investment ==
In the 1900s, the Tuscarora Valley began to suffer from increased labor expenses and operating costs. The causes are not understood in detail, although they may be attributable in part to capital improvements to the original lightly built narrow gauge infrastructure, including the construction of concrete abutments for the railroad's bridges and a creamery and warehouse in Port Royal in 1912. This era also saw a turnover in the railroad's management; after the death of T.S. Moorhead in 1906, all of the other Moorheads disappeared from the board and offices of the railroad. Initially replaced by other local men, the railroad then seems to have fallen into the hands of New York investors, such as Jacob S. Farlee, president from 1910 to 1915. However, locals were still represented on the board of directors, albeit as a minority; for instance, J.M. Blair was vice-president of the railroad during this era. A revival of the Tuscarora Railroad's charter was granted in January 1910 under the influence of the New York group, to extend south to Hancock and the B&O, but the Tuscarora was declared abandoned again in 1912. The financial condition of the Tuscarora Valley continued to deteriorate, and after 1913, it was unable to pay its bonded interest. The railroad was nearly abandoned, but the lumber brokers Blair and Hower bought up the railroad's bonds in early 1915 and gained control of a majority of the stock by 1917. By protecting the unprofitable railroad, they could ensure that their lumber businesses could retain access to what was, as yet, the only means of transportation in the Tuscarora Valley capable of sustaining them.

== Final years ==
Although Blair and Hower's takeover had relieved the railroad from the prospect of foreclosure when its bonds came due in 1917, the business outlook remained grim. An improved highway up the valley had begun construction in 1912. The railroad also had to grapple with the expense of transshipment to standard gauge cars at Port Royal; the Tuscarora Valley was particularly vulnerable due to its lack of a major shipper producing a steady volume of commodities. Operating expenses rose sharply in 1917, and the following year saw a brief takeover by the United States Railroad Administration, whose federally mandated wage increases created a further loss for the railroad. In 1919, Blair died and was replaced as president by J.E. Robertson, the chief cashier at his bank and the company treasurer for the past five years.

The railroad appeared to experience a renaissance during the early 1920s, making a slight profit, but this was largely funded through deferred maintenance, and economies such as the abandonment of the shops at Ross Farm, which were moved to a new enginehouse at Blairs Mills. In 1927, the expense of operation finally exceeded gross earnings. Income continued to fall in 1928, and while details are not known, the poor quality of the physical plant made it difficult to compete with trucks and automobiles. The redirection of passenger travel to automobiles and the decline in the use of East Coast lumber in the face of West Coast products both hurt the railroad. The final blow was delivered by the Great Depression.

As an economy measure, a motor truck rebuilt into a railbus in the 1920s increasingly substituted for rail service. The company acquired several highway trucks as well, using them to cover its mail contract from Port Royal to Blairs Mills. Freight and mail service were largely moved to the motor trucks, and the railroad bought a bus for passenger service in 1931. However, as the railroad was still required to operate under railroad rate structures, its highway operations lost money. By the end of 1933, service had dwindled down to a weekly, then a monthly train, and most of the employees had been laid off.

The last operations took place, as needed, in the spring of 1934. Robertson and Hower agreed to abandon the line at a meeting on May 10, and petitioned the Interstate Commerce Commission for permission to do so on May 22. No official protests were raised. Operations continued as necessary to fill the mail contract, which ended on October 1, the official end of rail service. Most of the remaining equipment was moved to the Port Royal yard, and the line was scrapped from Blairs Mills north. Hower's lumber business continued in Port Royal until he died in 1944, despite the loss of the rail connection.

== Operation ==
=== Stations ===
Name	Mileage	Notes
Port Royal		Used PRR station; site of car house, wye, and offices
Old Port		
Turbett		no station facilities
Freedom		no station facilities
Graham		no station facilities
Spruce Hill		Water tank, station
Esh		
Pleasant View		
Warble		
Fort Bingham		
Honey Grove		
Heckman		
East Waterford		Former shops, turntable (removed). Station intact today
Perulack		
Ross Farm		Engine house and shops, water tank
Leonard's Grove		
Waterloo		Station intact today
Blairs Mills		Turntable (later wye), engine house
