= Hemlocks Natural Area =

Natural area in Pennsylvania

- Location within Pennsylvania
- Location: Perry County, Pennsylvania
- Nearest town: Doylesburg
- Coordinates: 40°14′18″N 77°38′29″W
- Area: 120 acres (49 ha)
- Established: 1921

Hemlocks Natural Area is a 120-acre (49 ha) protected area in Perry County, Pennsylvania, United States. It is part of Tuscarora State Forest. The area has been designated as a National Natural Landmark.

== Description ==
The Natural Area was established to protect a parcel of old-growth hemlock trees nestled in a narrow gorge formed by Patterson Run. The area was originally established as a Pennsylvania Forest Monument in 1921, and in 1973 it was named a National Natural Landmark. The old-growth forest parcel has also been recognized nationally, and was added to the Old-Growth Forest Network in 2022.
