= O'Donel House and Farm =

Historic house in Pennsylvania, US

- U.S. National Register of Historic Places
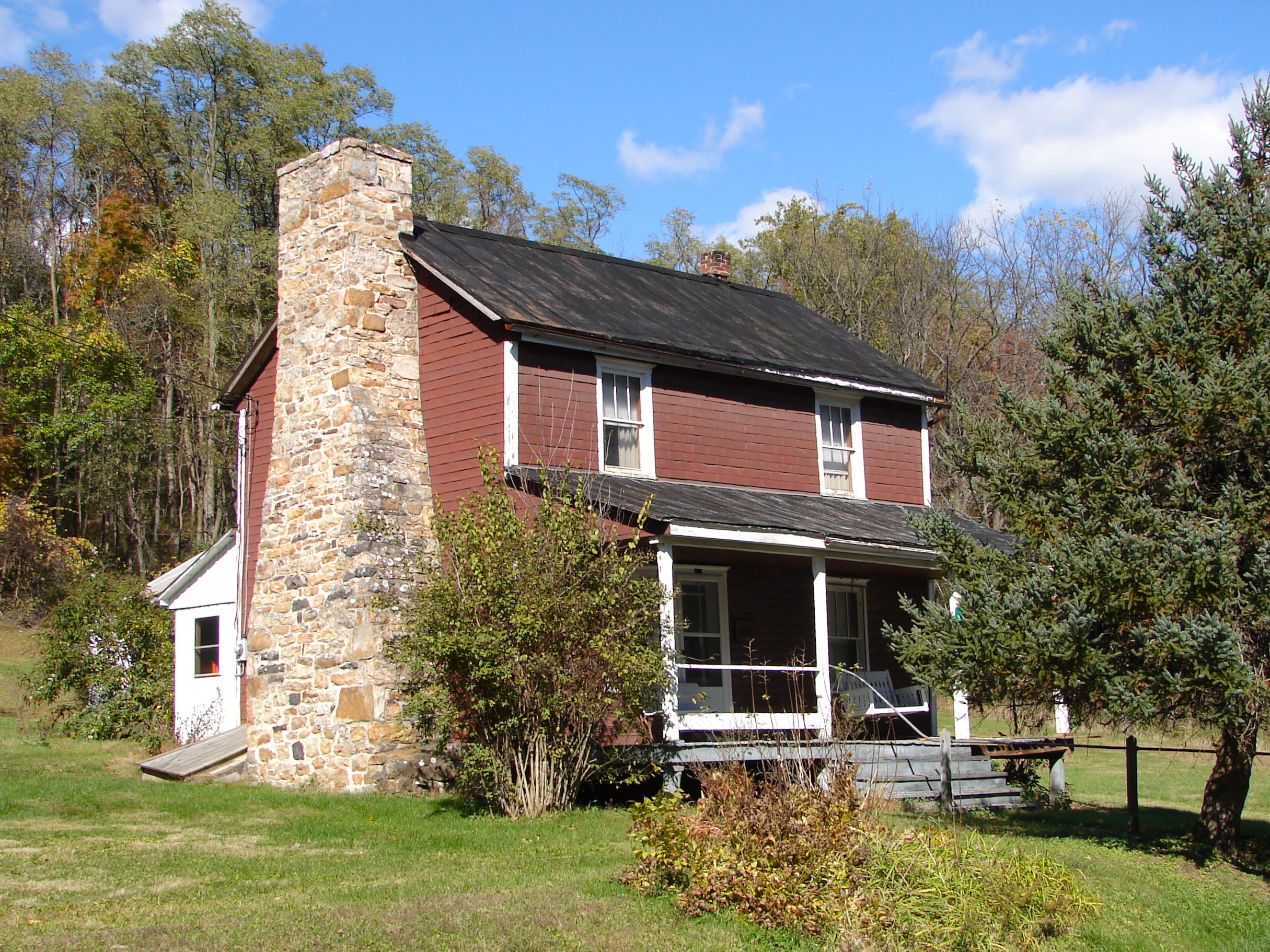
- O'Donel House and Farm, October 2010

- Location within Pennsylvania Location within the United States
- Location: West of New Germantown on Pennsylvania Route 274, Toboyne Township, Pennsylvania
- Coordinates: 40°16′53″N 77°37′19″W
- Area: less than one acre
- Built: 1863
- Architect: Yocum, David
- NRHP reference No.: 86001687
- Added to NRHP: July 17, 1986

O'Donel House and Farm is a historic home and farm complex located at Toboyne Township near Blain in Perry County, Pennsylvania. The complex consists of the farm house, bank barn, wood shed, outhouse, and combination washhouse / smokehouse. The two bay house, erected about 1863, is built in the log corner post style (pièce-sur-pièce) and rests on a foundation of coursed fieldstone.

It was listed on the National Register of Historic Places in 1986.
