= Perry Lumber Company =

Perry Lumber Company Railroad
Overview
- Locale: Perry County, Pennsylvania
- Dates of operation: 1901–1905

Technical
- Track gauge: 3 ft (914 mm)

The Perry Lumber Company was an early 20th-century company which owned timberland in Perry County, Pennsylvania.

The company was organized by Harrisburg businessmen about 1900. By December 1901, they had acquired eleven tracts of forested land near the border with Franklin County. They planned to produce various types of sawn lumber products, as well as extract wood for a tannery in Newport. The owners of the lumber company originally hoped to have the Newport and Shermans Valley Railroad converted to standard gauge to facilitate shipment, but they were unable to come to terms with the N&SV's owner, David Gring. As a result, when Perry Lumber began constructing a railroad into their timberlands, they built it to the 3 ft (914 mm) narrow gauge of the N&SV.

The Perry Lumber Railroad used part of a roadbed originally cleared and graded by the Path Valley Railroad. Beginning at New Germantown, where it connected with the N&SV, it followed the Path Valley grade to Bryner's farm. There it turned between Trostle and Skinner Ridges and climbed up behind and around Trostle Ridge, along what is now Bowman Trail. It then made another sharp turn and dropped down between Rising Mountain and Buck Ridge on a 5.5% grade, now the Perry Lumber Road. At the base of the descent, a branch ran southwest about 1 mile (1.6 km) down Fowler Hollow Run along the present Perry Lumber Road. The main line turned and ran up Fowler Hollow Run to Shultz Run, where a company sawmill was located. It continued up the run and climbed between Amberson Ridge and Shultz Ridge alongside the present Couch Road. Running southwest along the south side of Amberson Ridge, it ended at Couch Camp, near Shaeffer Run. The entire railroad was about 12 miles (19 km) in length. The company owned one Class B 25-ton Climax locomotive, Alfarata, which was housed in a crude enginehouse at New Germantown. The N&SV shops built thirty lumber cars for the lumber company.

Portable sawmills were moved along the right-of-way as necessary to saw the timber. The principal trees logged by the company were white pine, white oak, chestnut, and hemlock. While lumber was the principal product of the company, chestnut, hemlock, and oak bark were also shipped as extract wood to Newport. The timber was logged out in 1905, and the company closed up, selling the lumber cars to the N&SV and the engine to the East Waterford Lumber Company. In April 1907, the Commonwealth of Pennsylvania bought its land, establishing the McClure Division of Tuscarora State Forest. Part of the grade also lies within Fowlers Hollow State Park.
