= East Waterford Lumber Company =

East Waterford and Kansas Valley Railroad
Overview
- Locale: Juniata and Perry County, Pennsylvania
- Dates of operation: 1905–1909

Technical
- Track gauge: 3 ft (914 mm)
- Length: 8 miles (13 km)

The East Waterford Lumber Company was an early 20th-century company which leased and harvested timberland in Juniata and Perry County, Pennsylvania.

== Background ==
The company was organized by Daniel Buck of Bellefonte, James Hockenberry of East Waterford, and a third partner, named Brown, about 1905. The company built a sawmill, two stave mills, and a lath mill in East Waterford. This town was served by the narrow gauge Tuscarora Valley Railroad, which provided an outlet for finished lumber from the mills. The additional cost of transfer between the Tuscarora Valley and the standard gauge Pennsylvania Railroad forced the lumber company to specialize in finished lumber, rather than lower-margin mine props.

To bring timber to the mills, the company planned a logging railroad from a connection with the Tuscarora Valley at East Waterford toward its timberlands. The railroad was incorporated on May 16, 1905 as the East Waterford and Kansas Valley Railroad, and it acquired the rails and Climax locomotive of the Perry Lumber Company, which was then being dismantled.

The railroad was built using a 3 ft (914 mm) narrow gauge, the same as the connecting Tuscarora Valley. The line ran south from the interchange at East Waterford and the mills along Horse Valley Road, following the road through Waterford Gap in Tuscarora Mountain. Past the mountain, it forked, with one branch running up Kansas Valley to the company's lumber camp at Big Knob, and the other running south along Horse Valley. The total length was less than 8 miles (13 km).

On April 1, 1907, Brown was bought out by Cummings McNitt, formerly a partner of the logging operation McNitt Bros. & Co. McNitt gradually purchased the interests of Buck and Hockenberry as logging progressed, and was sole owner when the company was wound up after exhaustion of the timber. McNitt entered into partnership with H.C. Hower, the lumber broker who disposed of much of the timber shipped over the Tuscarora Valley Railroad, and they formed the Juniata Lumber Company to log a tract in Maryland. The Climax locomotive was sold to the new company and the railroad was dismantled in 1909.

The line up Kansas Valley and a small part of the line in Horse Valley now lies within the boundaries of Tuscarora State Forest.

== Bibliography ==
- Kline, Benjamin F. G. Jr. (1999) [1971]. Pitch Pine and Prop Timber. Friends of the Railroad Museum of Pennsylvania/Pennsylvania Historical and Museum Commission.
- Taber, Thomas T. III (1987). Railroads of Pennsylvania Encyclopedia and Atlas. Thomas T. Taber III. ISBN 0-9603398-5-X.
