= Frank Masland Jr. =

American conservationist and early river runner

Frank Elmer Masland Jr
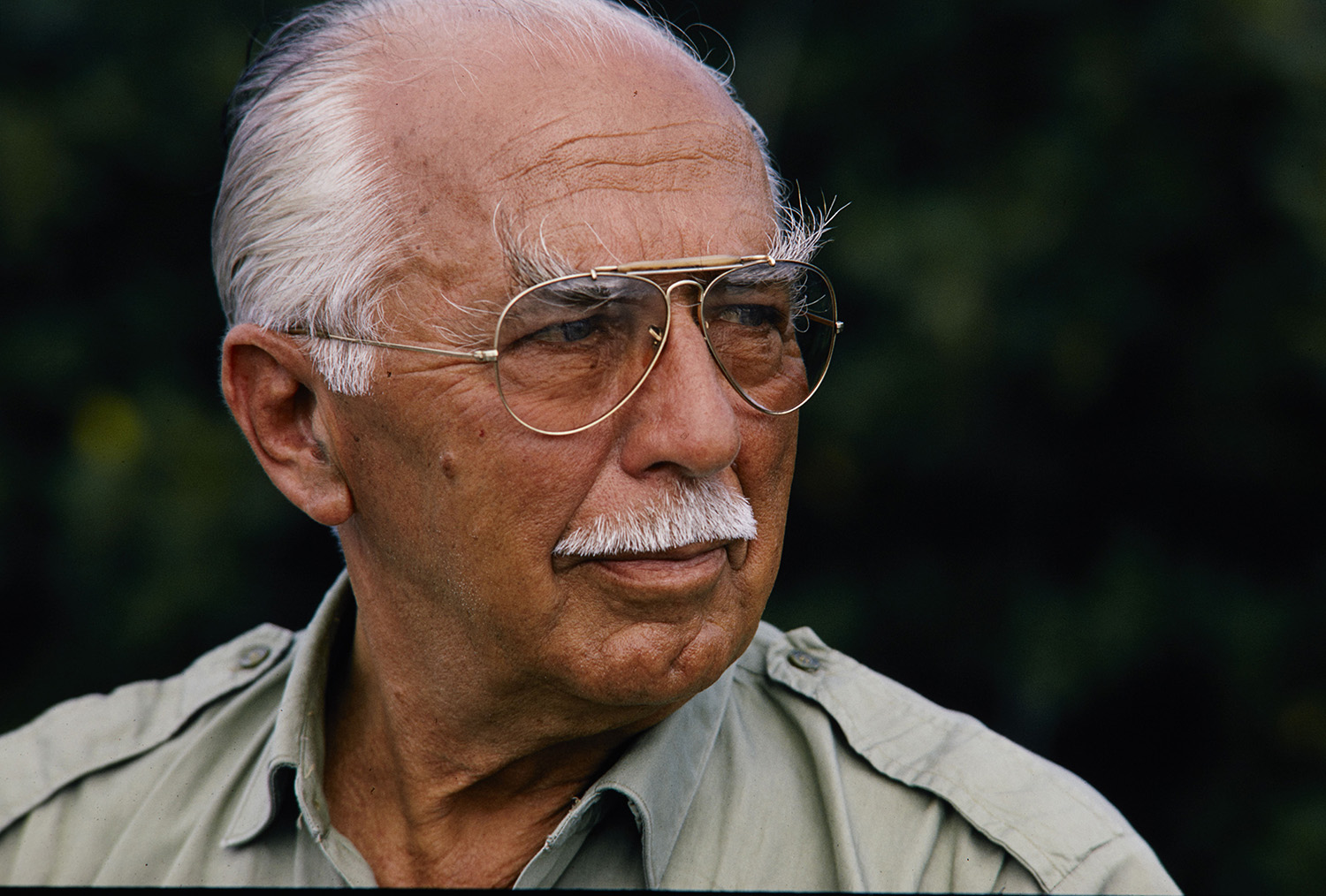
- Born: Frank Elmer Masland Jr; December 8, 1895; Philadelphia, Pennsylvania
- Died: July 30, 1994 (aged 98); Carlisle, Pennsylvania
- Resting place: Mount Holly, Pennsylvania
- Other names: Fisheyes, Archeyes
- Education: Dickinson College
- Occupations: industrialist, conservationist, explorer, early river runner, and philanthropist
- Employer(s): CH Masland & Sons
- Spouse(s): Virginia Sharp, Florence Corey
- Children: Frank Elmer “Mike” Masland III and David Sharp Masland

Frank Elmer Masland Jr (December 8, 1895 – July 30, 1994) was an American industrialist, conservationist, explorer, early river runner in the Grand Canyon, and philanthropist.

== Biography ==
Born to Frank Elmer Masland and Mary Esther Gossler on December 8, 1895, he was the grandson of Charles Henry Masland, founder of the Carlisle carpet company C. H. Masland & Sons. During World War I, Masland attended Dickinson College and graduated in 1918. That same year, he became an ensign in the United States Navy Reserve. While he did not fight overseas, he served on a sub chaser searching for German U-boats along the east coast of the United States. Masland served in the Navy for two years and the Naval Reserves for two more. He was honorably discharged on April 29, 1921.

Masland and his brother Robert Paul relocated C. H. Masland & Sons from Philadelphia to Carlisle, Pennsylvania in 1919. Construction for the new building began on July 1, 1919. Between 1930 and 1961, Frank Masland served as the president of C. H. Masland & Sons, leading the company through World War II and into the decades that followed. During the war, the company converted its operations entirely to the war effort making waterproof canvas and earned the Army-Navy E Award for excellence in wartime production five times.

In 1951, the carpet company purchased "Kings Gap", a 32-room stone mansion in Cumberland County, Pennsylvania. In 1973, the company transferred ownership of the property to the Commonwealth of Pennsylvania through the auspices of the Nature Conservancy. Today, the property is known as Kings Gap Environmental Education Center. Besides the carpet company, Masland was active in both the National Association of Manufacturers and the Pennsylvania Manufacturers Association. He served as director of the First National Bank of Mount Holly as well as the president and director of Denicron Corporation from 1939 into the late 1950s. Masland served as a regional director of the Small Business Administration during the 1960s and 1970s. He also served as a trustee of Wesley Theological Seminary and Dickinson College. Masland was awarded honorary doctorate degrees from Lycoming College and Lebanon Valley College, and received the YMCA "Master of Men" Award. A member of The Explorers Club, Cosmos Club, University Club of New York, and the Boone and Crockett Club, Masland was a member in a small group of Colorado River Canyoneers who ran the Grand Canyon in the 1940s.

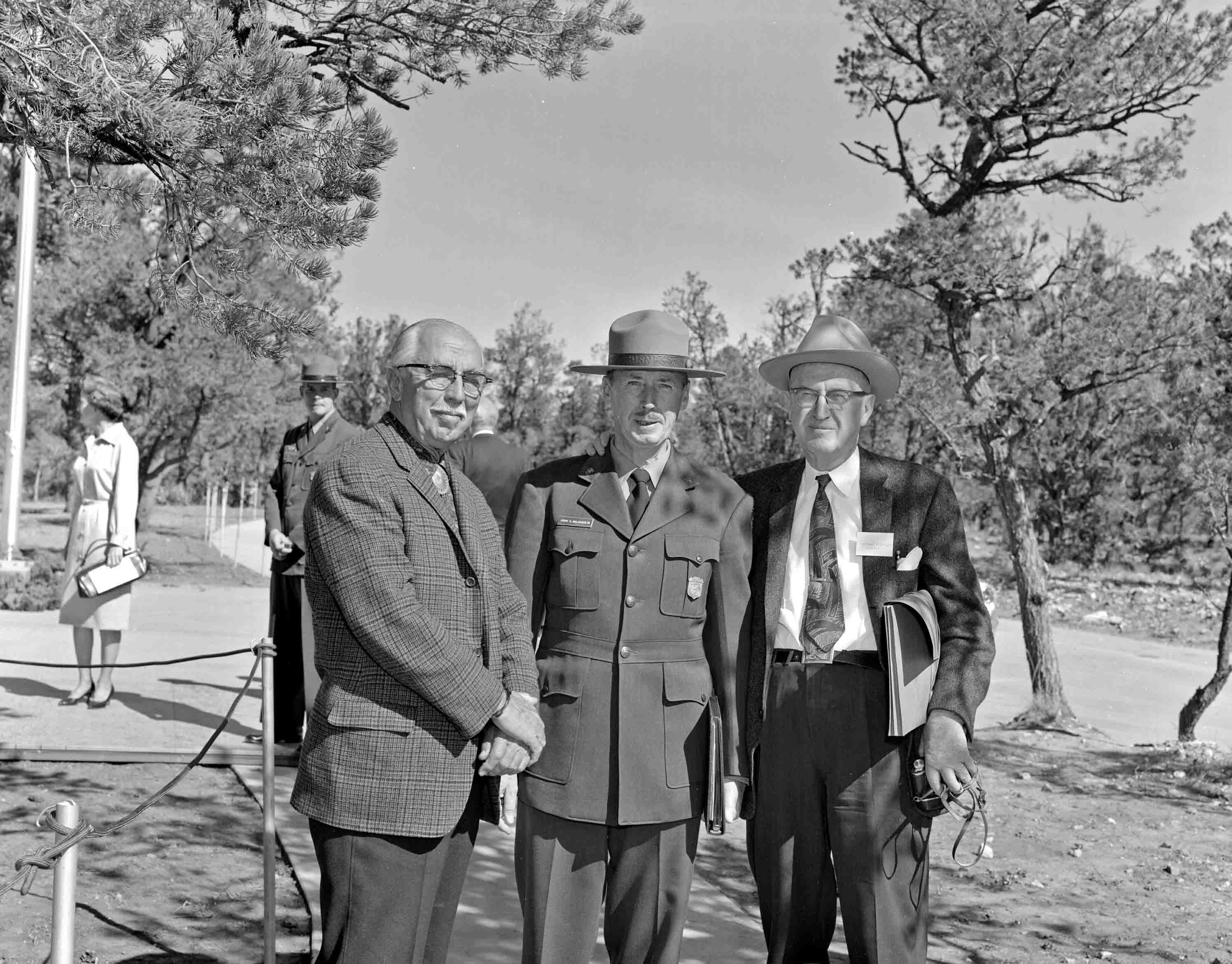
Frank E. Masland, Superintendent John McLaughlin, and Horace Albright, 1964

Frank Masland first visited the rim of the Grand Canyon in 1938 and first boated the entire length of the Colorado River in Grand Canyon in 1948 with Norman Nevills and Otis R. Marston. On that river trip Masland acquired the nickname "Fisheyes." Marston listed Masland as the 97th person to travel all the way through the Grand Canyon by the water route. Masland traveled through Grand Canyon again in 1949 with Nevills and Mary Ogden Abbott and in 1954 and 1956 with Marston.

After he boated Grand Canyon in 1949, Masland purchased a canvas on wooden frame Folding kayak. He paddled the craft from Mexican Hat, Utah, down the San Juan River into Glen Canyon in July, 1950. He took the same boat through Glen Canyon again in 1952, arriving at Lees Ferry, Arizona in time to join Barry Goldwater and others to dedicate a plaque to the deceased Norm and Doris Nevills at the Navajo Bridge.

Masland and Marston conducted horse packing trips in the slickrock rim country of Glen Canyon during the construction of Glen Canyon Dam. On their first such trip in 1954, the group reached an arch Masland had seen from the road to Navajo Mountain Lodge in 1950. At the Arch, Marston nicknamed him "Archeyes."

In 1954 Masland lobbied Secretary of Interior Douglas McKay in opposition to Echo Park Dam. Masland served on the National Park Service Advisory Board from 1958 to 1979, serving three years straight as its chair. Masland worked closely with Secretary of Interior Stewart Udall and Lady Bird Johnson to create Canyonlands National Park. In a 1965 letter, Udall wrote “Whether it’s hiking with me on the Serengeti Plains on Tanganyika, running the Allagash River of Maine or scrambling on the high country of Utah, Frank Masland has demonstrated his devotion to the out of doors and preserving a conservation heritage for future generations of Americans. Thank heavens for people like Frank!”

In 1980, 1,270 acres of secondary old growth forest in the Tuscarora State Forest in Pennsylvania was named in his honor as the Frank E. Masland Jr. Natural Area. After four years of negotiation, Masland donated $200,000 (~$472,351 in 2024) in 1987 to the National Park Service and Pennsylvania Fish and Boat Commission for the purchase of 50 acres of private land in Boiling Springs, Pennsylvania, including Children's Lake, for transfer to the Appalachian Trail Conference Land Trust (today's Appalachian Trail Conservancy).
