= Toboyne Township, Perry County, Pennsylvania =

Township in Pennsylvania, US

Coordinates: 40°14′00″N 77°34′59″W

Toboyne Township, Pennsylvania
- Township
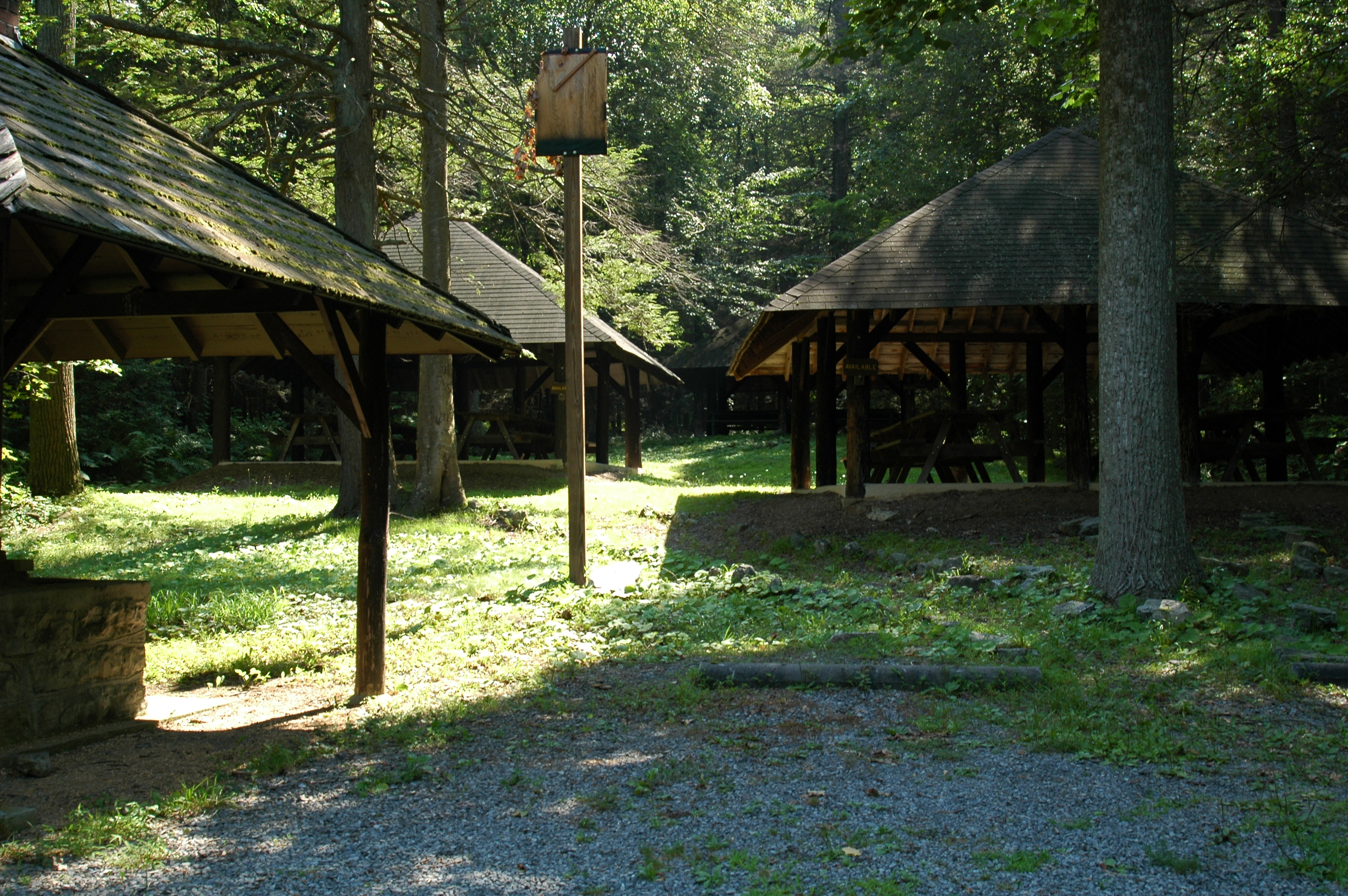
- Big Spring State Forest Picnic Area is in Toboyne Township

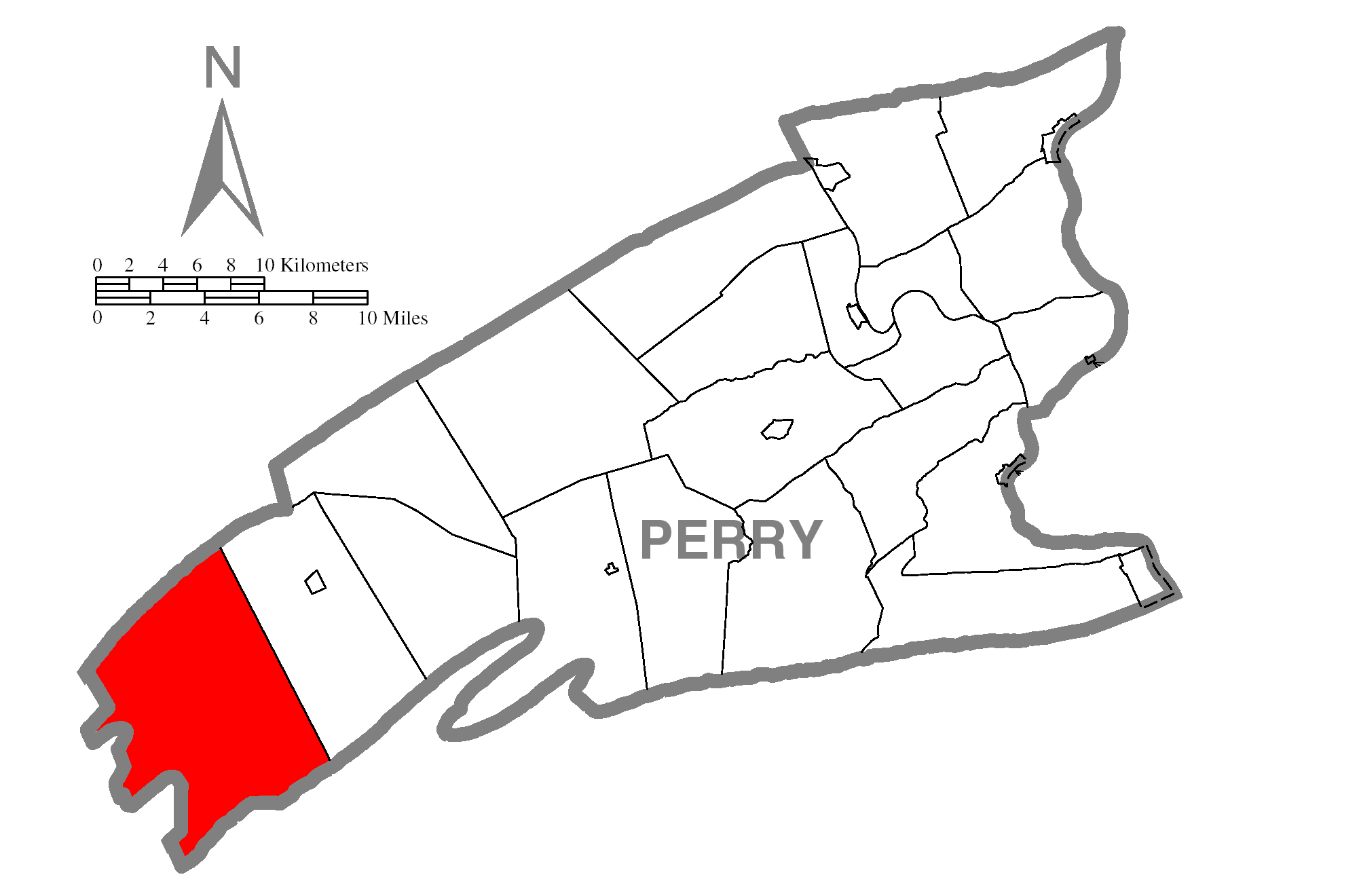
- Map of Perry County, Pennsylvania highlighting Toboyne Township

- Map of Perry County, Pennsylvania
- Country: United States
- State: Pennsylvania
- County: Perry
- Settled: 1755
- Incorporated: 1763

Area
  - Total: 56.22 sq mi (145.61 km^{2})
  - Land: 56.13 sq mi (145.38 km^{2})
  - Water: 0.089 sq mi (0.23 km^{2})

Population (2020)
  - Total: 467 ▲
  - Estimate (2023): 472
  - Density: 7.8/sq mi (3.03/km^{2})
- Time zone: UTC-5 (Eastern (EST))
  - Summer (DST): UTC-4 (EDT)
- Area code: 717
- FIPS code: 42-099-76920

Toboyne Township is a township in Perry County, Pennsylvania, United States. The population was 467 at the 2020 census. Big Spring State Forest Picnic Area is on the western end of Toboyne Township near Conococheague Mountain. Fowlers Hollow State Park is also in the township. It is named after Taughboyne, County Donegal, Ireland.

== History ==
The Israel and Samuel Lupfer Tannery Site and House and O'Donel House and Farm are listed on the National Register of Historic Places.

== Geography ==
According to the United States Census Bureau, the township has a total area of 56.3 square miles (145.7 km^{2}), all land.

== Demographics ==
Historical population
Census	Pop.	Note	%±
2010	443		—
2020	467		5.4%
2023 (est.)	472		1.1%
U.S. Decennial Census

As of the census of 2000, there were 494 people, 195 households, and 140 families residing in the township. The population density was 8.8 people per square mile (3.4/km^{2}). There were 541 housing units at an average density of 9.6/sq mi (3.7/km^{2}). The racial makeup of the township was 99.19% White, 0.20% Native American, and 0.61% from two or more races.

There were 195 households, out of which 28.2% had children under the age of 18 living with them, 65.1% were married couples living together, 4.6% had a female householder with no husband present, and 27.7% were non-families. 24.6% of all households were made up of individuals, and 11.8% had someone living alone who was 65 years of age or older. The average household size was 2.53 and the average family size was 3.05.

In the township the population was spread out, with 24.5% under the age of 18, 4.9% from 18 to 24, 24.7% from 25 to 44, 29.6% from 45 to 64, and 16.4% who were 65 years of age or older. The median age was 42 years. For every 100 females, there were 106.7 males. For every 100 females age 18 and over, there were 98.4 males.

The median income for a household in the township was $30,833, and the median income for a family was $33,125. Males had a median income of $36,083 versus $20,417 for females. The per capita income for the township was $15,537. About 11.5% of families and 18.4% of the population were below the poverty line, including 36.9% of those under age 18 and 9.0% of those age 65 or over.
