= Fowler Hollow Run =

Stream in Perry County, Pennsylvania, U.S.

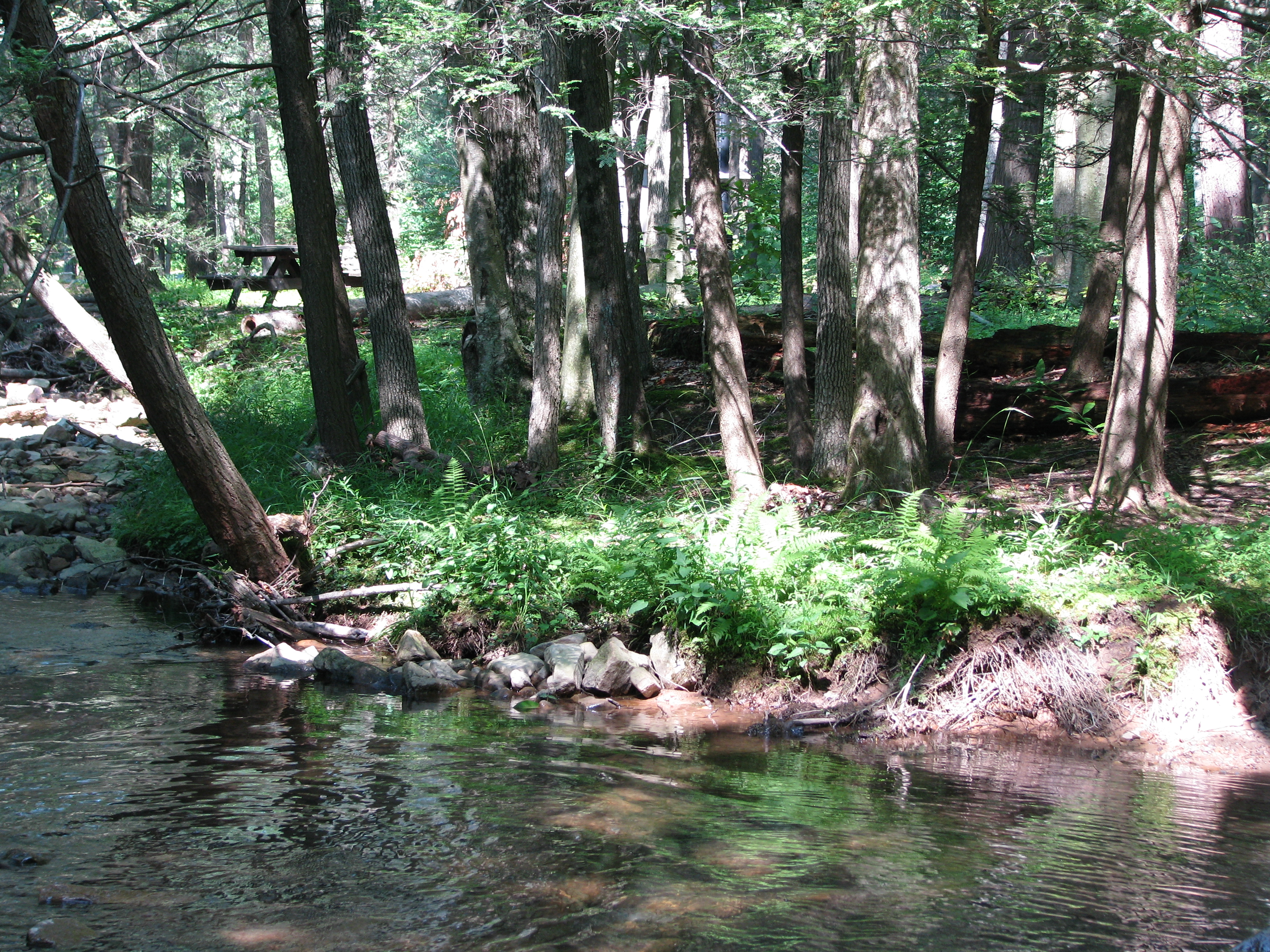
Fowler Hollow Run at Fowlers Hollow State Park

Fowler Hollow Run is a stream in Perry County, Pennsylvania, in the United States. It is part of the Susquehanna River watershed as it is a tributary of Shultz Creek, which is a tributary of Shermans Creek, which flows into the Susquehanna. The drainage basin for Fowler Hollow Run is 5.59 square miles (14.48 km^{2}) and enters Shultz Creek 3.90 miles (6.28 km) from its mouth on Shermans Creek. It is 48.14 miles (77.47 km) along Shermans Creek to the lower Susquehanna River.

The 6.2 mile (10 km) waterway creates a narrow valley, part of which is designated Fowlers Hollow State Park. The stream is a popular site for fishing brown and brook trout and is stocked by the Pennsylvania Fish and Boat Commission before the opening of the fishing season. It also has a good population of native brook trout.
