= Fowlers Hollow State Park =

State park in Perry County, Pennsylvania, United States

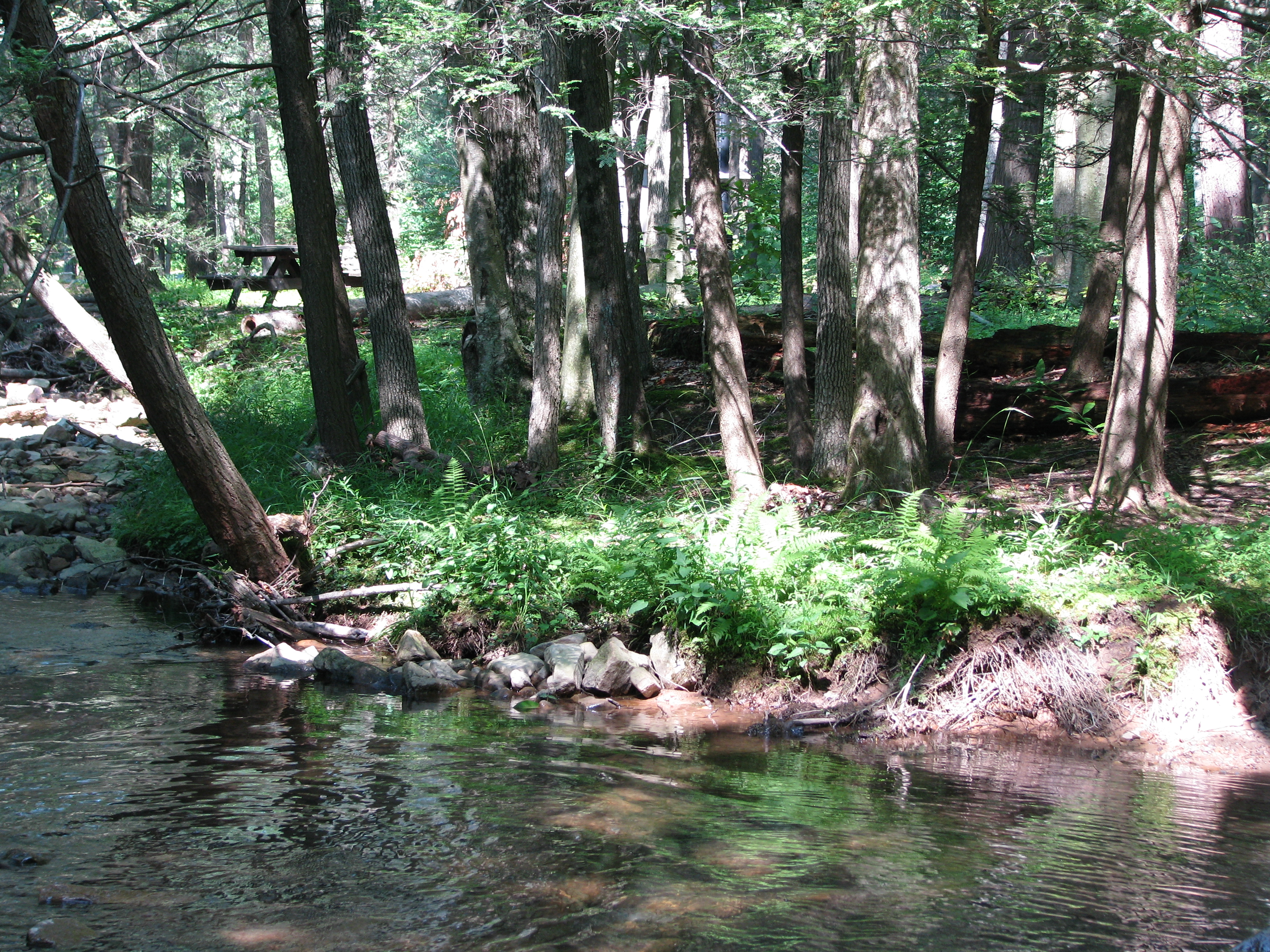
- Fowler Hollow Run in Fowlers Hollow State Park

- Location within Pennsylvania Location within the United States
- Interactive map of Fowlers Hollow State Park
- Location: Toboyne Township, Perry County, Pennsylvania, United States
- Coordinates: 40°16′32″N 77°34′35″W
- Area: 104 acres (42 ha)
- Elevation: 892 feet (272 m)
- Established: 1936
- Administrator: Pennsylvania Department of Conservation and Natural Resources
- Website: Official website
- Pennsylvania State Parks

Fowlers Hollow State Park is a 104-acre (42 ha) Pennsylvania state park in Toboyne Township, Perry County, Pennsylvania in the United States. The park is 0.25 miles (400 m) from Blain just off Pennsylvania Route 274. Fowlers Hollow State Park is on the site of a former sawmill, and was developed as a park by the Works Progress Administration during the Great Depression.

== History ==
The land on which Fowlers Hollow State Park sits was clear cut during the early 1900s (decade). The Perry Lumber Company built a narrow-gauge railroad on the former Path Valley Railroad bed from New Germantown to the area of what is now Big Spring State Forest Picnic Area. The lumber company never built a permanent sawmill in the area. Instead they used five portable mills. Lumber was cut and bark was stripped from the hemlock. The standing lumber was quickly exhausted and logging operations were complete in the area by 1905. The state of Pennsylvania bought 2,573 acres (10.41 km^{2}) from the Perry Lumber Company in 1907. Construction of the park facilities took place during the Great Depression by works of the Works Progress Administration.

== Recreation ==
Fowlers Hollow State Park is used by families on picnics and outdoor enthusiasts seeking to hunt, fish, snowmobile, and ski within the park and in the nearby Tuscarora State Forest. The picnic facilities at the park have stone fireplaces that were built by the CCC. Fowler Hollow Run passes through the park and is a brown trout fishery. There are 18 campsites at the park: twelve are for trailers, and six for tents. It also serves as a trailhead for the trail system of the Tuscarora State Forest. Hunters, snowmobilers, and cross-country skiers also use the park to gain access to the surrounding state forest.
