= Frank E. Masland Jr. Natural Area =

Natural area in Pennsylvania

- Location within Pennsylvania
- Location: Perry County, Pennsylvania
- Nearest town: McCrea
- Coordinates: 40°14′54″N 77°31′00″W
- Area: 1,270 acres (510 ha)

Frank E. Masland Jr. Natural Area is a 1,270-acre (510 ha) protected area in Perry County, Pennsylvania, United States. It is part of Tuscarora State Forest. It is named after Pennsylvania conservationist and philanthropist Frank Masland Jr.

== Description ==
The Natural Area was established to protect two upper branches of North Laurel Run, that in turn provide water for an established second-growth forest. The area features the successful regeneration of a mixed oak forest that had been severely damaged by a gypsy moth infestation in the 1980s. The area has also been named as a special protection zone for reptiles and amphibians, and it contains a population of the regionally threatened Allegheny woodrat.
