= Port Royal, Pennsylvania =

Borough in Pennsylvania, US

- Borough
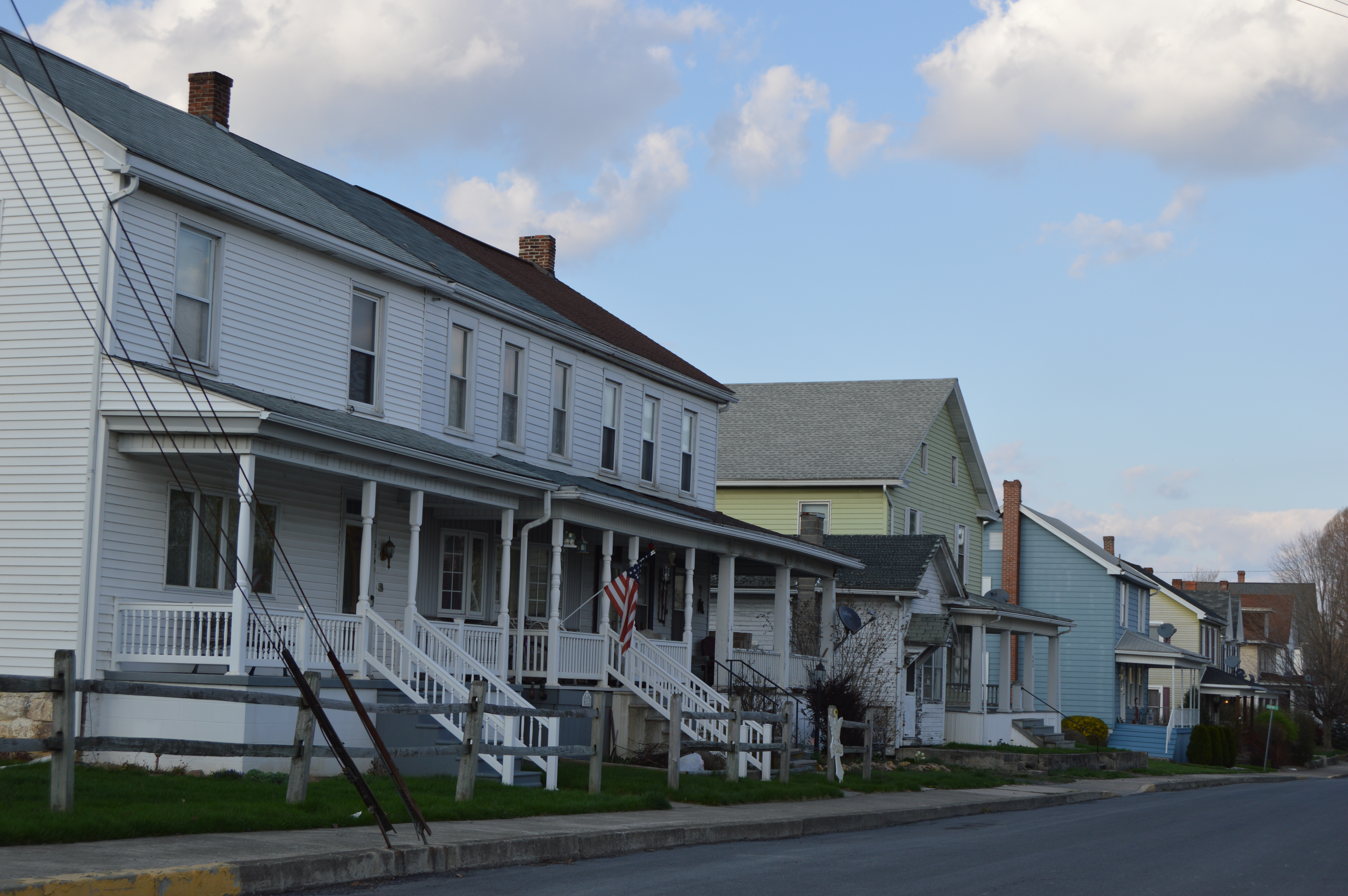
- Houses on Main Street

- Location of Port Royal in Juniata County, Pennsylvania.

- Location of Port Royal in Pennsylvania Port Royal (the United States)
- Coordinates: 40°32′0″N 77°23′15″W
- Country: United States
- State: Pennsylvania
- County: Juniata
- Settled: 1812
- Incorporated: 1843

Area
  - Total: 0.60 sq mi (1.56 km^{2})
  - Land: 0.60 sq mi (1.56 km^{2})
  - Water: 0 sq mi (0.00 km^{2})
- Elevation (Borough benchmark): 444 ft (135 m)
- Highest elevation (northwestern boundary of borough): 560 ft (170 m)
- Lowest elevation (Juniata River): 416 ft (127 m)

Population (2020)
  - Total: 807
  - Density: 1,340.6/sq mi (517.59/km^{2})
- Time zone: UTC-5 (Eastern (EST))
  - Summer (DST): UTC-4 (EDT)
- Zip code: 17082
- Area code: 717
- FIPS code: 42-62304
- Website: https://portroyalborough.org/

Port Royal is a borough in Juniata County, Pennsylvania, United States. The population was 815 at the 2020 census.

== History ==
Port Royal used to be named Perrysville, after Commodore Oliver Hazard Perry. At the time, the Port Royal post office was located in Saint Tammany town, just across the Tuscarora Creek. However, the Pennsylvania Railroad brought increased traffic through the area and prompted a move of the Port Royal post office into Perrysville in 1847. In 1874, the borough took on the name itself and Saint Tammany became known as Old Port.

Throughout the history of Port Royal, the general population was almost centered around agriculture. The rural counties within Port Royal include Turbett, Spruce Hill and Milford Townships, otherwise known as the Tuscarora Valley.

Port Royal (and Perrysville before it) once was a stop on the old main line of the Pennsylvania Railroad. Port Royal was, in fact, one of the first towns to be linked to the Pennsylvania Railroad system, as it lay along the Lewistown-to-Harrisburg stretch of the railroad—the first leg constructed after the new railroad was chartered. Located along the Juniata River, many forms of transportation passed through the small town as a result of the river being an essential transportation "highway" before automobiles.

However, the Pennsylvania Railroad station no longer exists. Port Royal was also the northern terminus of the Tuscarora Valley Railroad, a narrow-gauge railroad serving southern Juniata and northern Franklin counties. The railroad was decommissioned in the 1930s.

From the PRR station during the Gettysburg campaign of the Civil War, Union scout Stephen W. Pomeroy telegraphed the vital news to Governor Andrew Curtin that Robert E. Lee was concentrating the Army of Northern Virginia at Gettysburg. This was how state officials learned of this vital intelligence, which Pomeroy had carried for nearly sixty miles from near Lee's headquarters in Chambersburg. He had sewn the message into his belt strap of his pants.

== Geography ==
Port Royal is located at 40°32′0″N 77°23′15″W (40.533257, -77.387619).

Port Royal is located 40 miles northwest of Harrisburg. It has been depicted as the "halfway" mark between the Harrisburg capitol city and State College, home of Penn State.

According to the United States Census Bureau, the borough has a total area of 0.7 square miles (1.8 km^{2}), of which 0.7 square miles (1.8 km^{2}) is land and 0.04 square miles (0.10 km^{2}) (4.35%) is water.

== Demographics ==
Historical population
Census	Pop.	Note	%±
1880	621		—
1890	519		−16.4%
1900	546		5.2%
1910	535		−2.0%
1920	558		4.3%
1930	579		3.8%
1940	744		28.5%
1950	800		7.5%
1960	805		0.6%
1970	829		3.0%
1980	835		0.7%
1990	836		0.1%
2000	977		16.9%
2010	925		−5.3%
2020	807		−12.8%
2021 (est.)	804	▼	−0.4%

As of the census of 2000, there were 977 people, 398 households, and 278 families residing in the borough. The population density was 1,471.9 inhabitants per square mile (568.3/km^{2}). There were 434 housing units at an average density of 653.9 per square mile (252.5/km^{2}). The racial makeup of the borough was 95.70% White, 1.33% African American, 0.61% Native American, 0.41% Asian, 1.54% from other races, and 0.41% from two or more races. Hispanic or Latino of any race were 3.89% of the population.

There were 398 households, out of which 32.4% had children under the age of 18 living with them, 54.0% were married couples living together, 10.1% had a female householder with no husband present, and 29.9% were non-families. 26.1% of all households were made up of individuals, and 12.8% had someone living alone who was 65 years of age or older. The average household size was 2.45 and the average family size was 2.92.

In the borough the population was spread out, with 26.0% under the age of 18, 7.3% from 18 to 24, 30.4% from 25 to 44, 20.9% from 45 to 64, and 15.5% who were 65 years of age or older. The median age was 37 years. For every 100 females there were 93.5 males. For every 100 females age 18 and over, there were 89.8 males.

The median income for a household in the borough was $34,514, and the median income for a family was $39,479. Males had a median income of $28,750 versus $22,841 for females. The per capita income for the borough was $16,212. About 8.2% of families and 10.0% of the population were below the poverty line, including 11.1% of those under age 18 and 6.7% of those age 65 or over.

== Juniata County Fair ==
The first fair was held in Port Royal in 1852 and there has been an annual fair in the town thereafter. In 1887 the original fairgrounds south of town were found to lack adequate space and a larger tract of land was purchased north of the town, from Smith Kepner, in what is now known as the Juniata County Fair Grounds. Beginning as primarily a showcase for agrarian enterprise, the fair has slowly changed so that today it has much less of its agrarian roots. In 1953 weekly summer automobile racing began on a track that was originally built for horse racing and this activity has played a large part in focusing attention on the town during the summer months.

== Notable person ==
- Fred Frankhouse, Major League Baseball All-Star pitcher

== See also ==
- Port Royal Speedway
