= Newport and Shermans Valley Railroad =

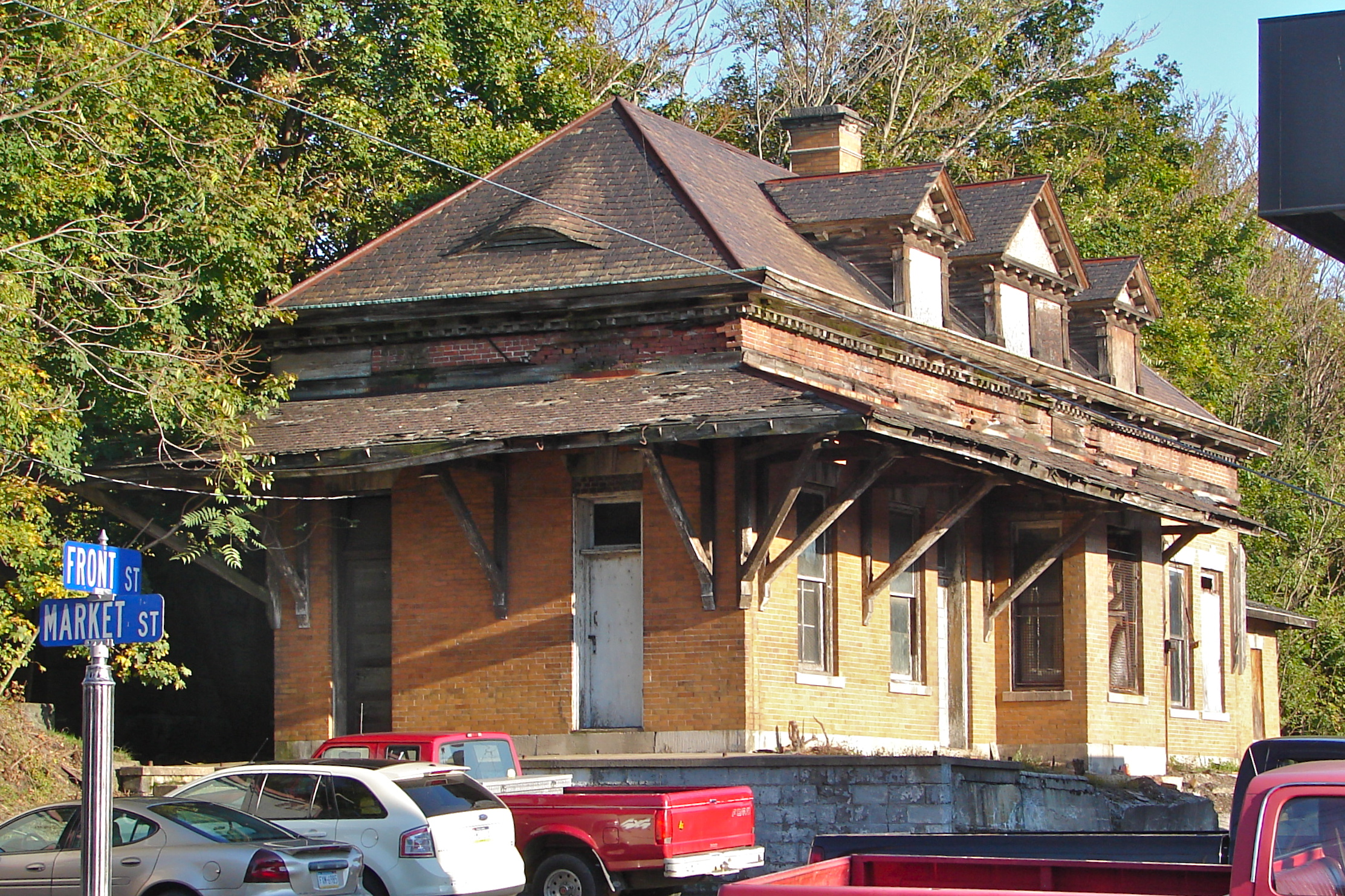
- Pennsylvania Railroad depot in Newport

Overview
- Locale: Perry County, Pennsylvania
- Dates of operation: 1890–1935

Technical
- Track gauge: 3 ft (914 mm)
- Length: 30.67 miles

Other
- Website: Big Spring State Park

The Newport and Shermans Valley Railroad was a nineteenth-century, American, 3 ft (914 mm) narrow gauge railroad that was located in Pennsylvania. It ran from Newport, Pennsylvania to New Germantown, Pennsylvania.

== History ==
The railroad's founder David Gring, who previously ran the Diamond Valley Railroad in Huntingdon County, relocated and reutilized his two locomotives from his previous venture, which were a Portable Saddle Tanker 0-6-0 steam locomotive and a 4-4-0 steam locomotive from the Kane and Elk Railroad.

The rail line carried lumber, and transferred it to the 4 ft 8 1/2 in (1,435 mm) standard gauge Pennsylvania Railroad at Newport. The right of way was extended to an uncompleted tunnel through Conococheague Mountain, started in an attempt to connect with the Path Valley Railroad. This right of way was later used by the Perry Lumber Company Railroad.

== Gallery ==
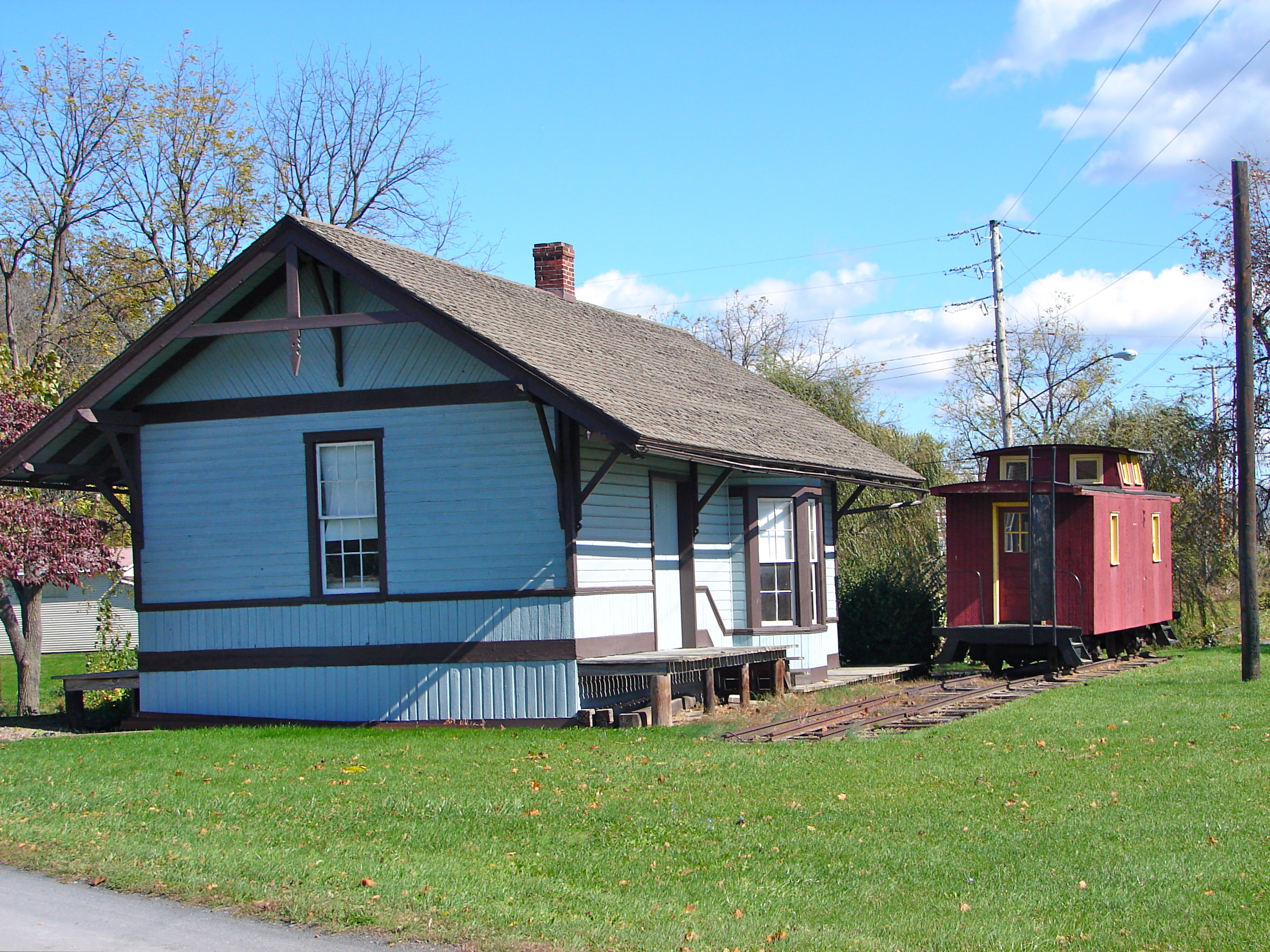
Restored depot in Blain, Pennsylvania
