= Blairs Mills, Pennsylvania =

Unincorporated community in Pennsylvania, US

- Unincorporated community
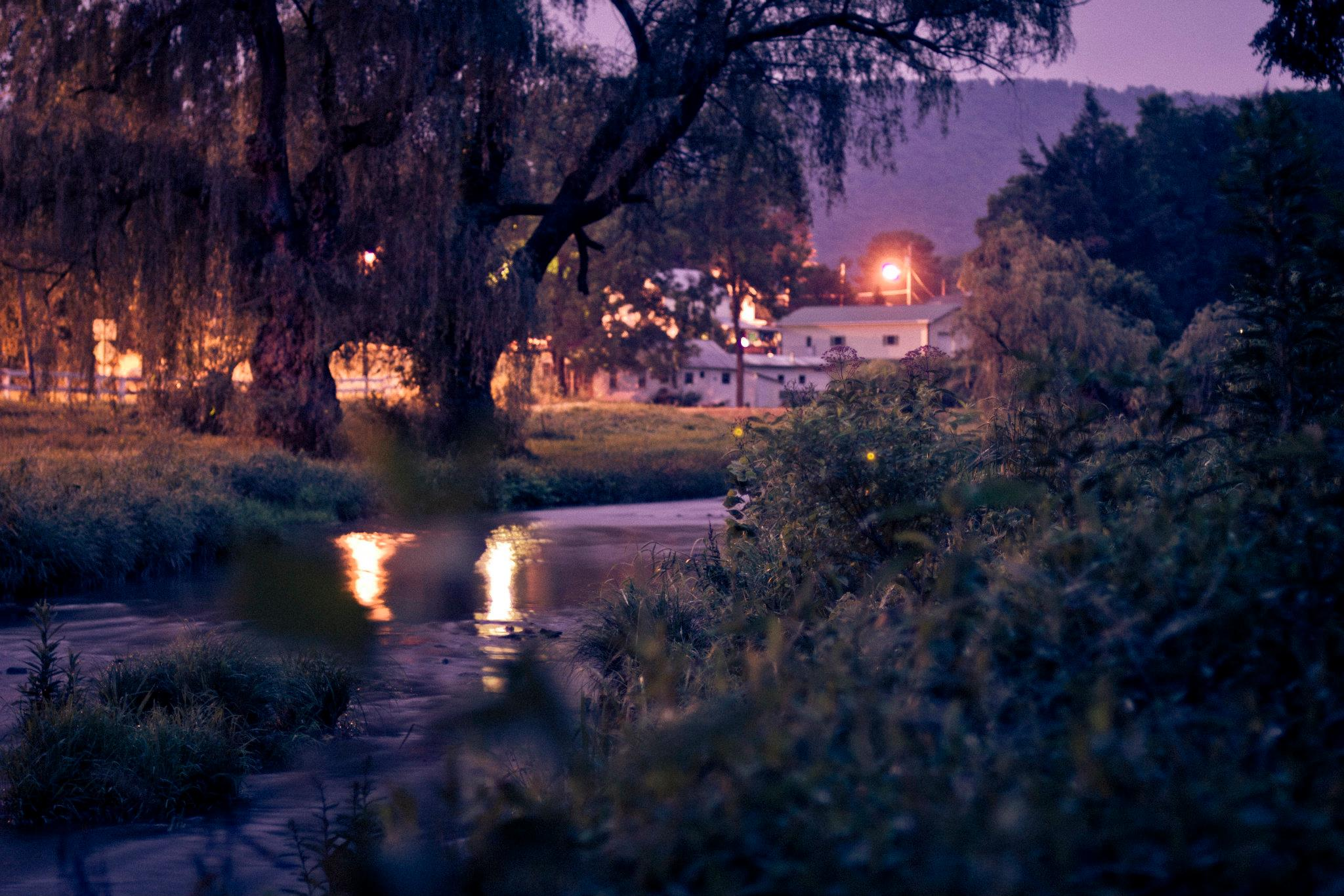
- Tuscarora Creek

- Location within Pennsylvania Location within the United States
- Coordinates: 40°17′01″N 77°43′06″W
- Country: United States
- State: Pennsylvania
- County: Huntingdon
- Township: Tell
- Elevation: 738 ft (225 m)
- Time zone: UTC-5 (Eastern (EST))
  - Summer (DST): UTC-4 (EDT)
- ZIP code: 17213
- Area codes: 223 & 717
- GNIS feature ID: 1169798

Blairs Mills is an unincorporated community in Huntingdon County, Pennsylvania, United States. The community is located near the eastern border of the county 21 miles (34 km) southeast of Huntingdon. Blairs Mills has a post office with ZIP code 17213.

Local School District: Southern Huntingdon County School District
