= Conococheague Mountain =

Mountain in Pennsylvania, US

- Location within Pennsylvania

Highest point
- Elevation: 2,190 ft (670 m)
- Coordinates: 40°14′41″N 77°40′58″W

Geography
- Location: Perry and Franklin counties, Pennsylvania, U.S.
- Topo map(s): USGS Blain, Blairs Mills, Doylesburg, McCoysville, and Spruce Hill

Conococheague Mountain is a long and narrow mountain located in the far western corner of Perry County, Pennsylvania. The highest point on the mountain is a summit known as Round Top; it rises to an elevation of 2,190 feet (670 m) and is located at the very southern end of the ridge. The mountain is almost entirely located in the Tuscarora State Forest, and has numerous hiking trails and dirt roads, including Bryner Road, New Germantown Road, and the Iron Horse Trail. The nearest town to the mountain is Blain.

== History ==
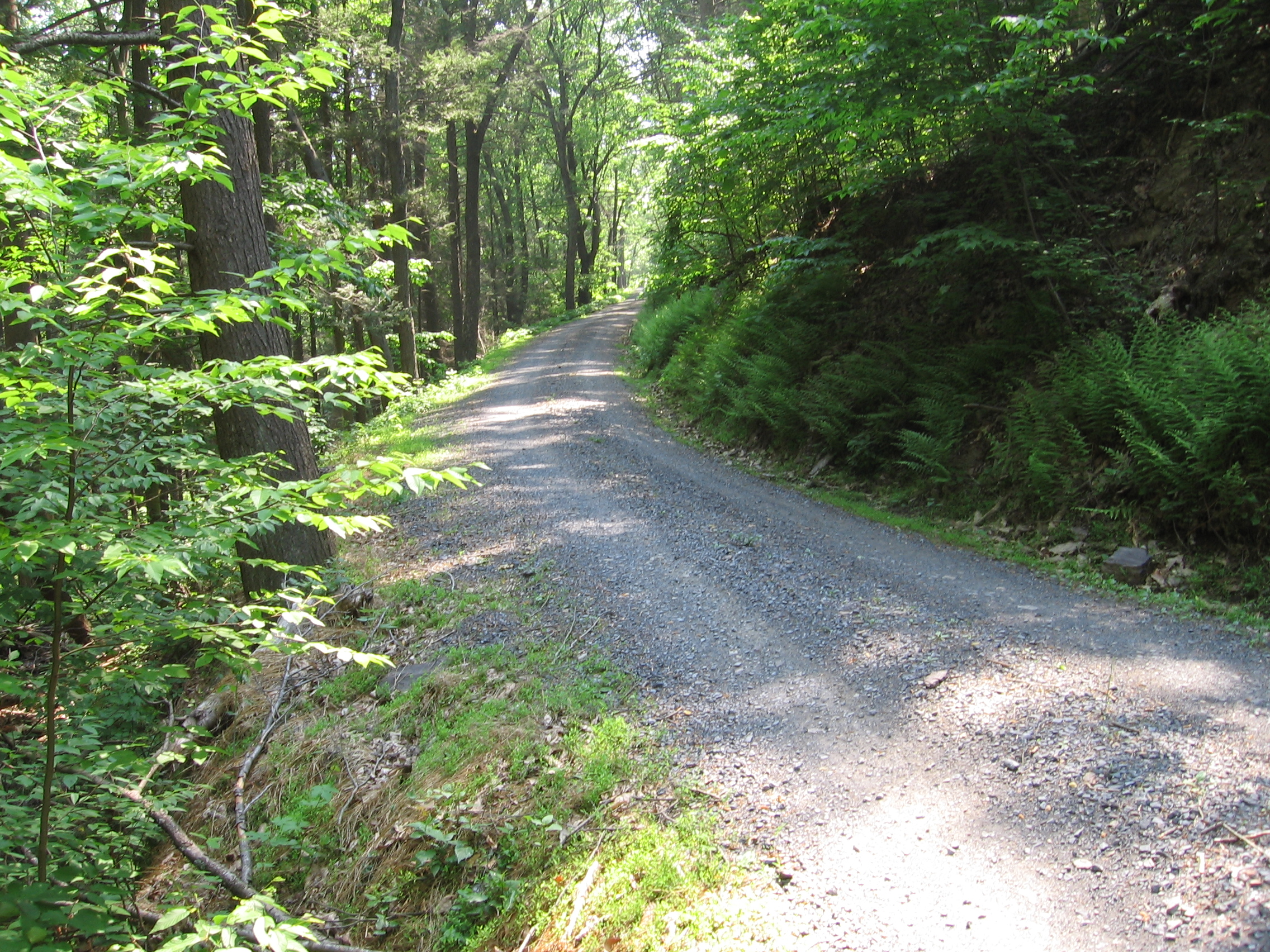
Bryner Road on Conococheague Mountain

The mountain was logged around the turn of the 20th century, and continues to be logged to this day. Beech, oak and hemlock are the most common species of tree. There are also several groves of white pine, which were planted for logging purposes. A logging mill was located at nearby Fowlers Hollow State Park, which was turned into a campsite and picnic area in the 1930s by the Civilian Conservation Corps.

On March 18, 2002, the Pennsylvania Department of Conservation and Natural Resources called for volunteers to clean up an illegal dumpsite at the top of the mountain, which had just been named one of the state’s "Dirty Dozen" under the state's Forest Lands Beautification Program. On April 6, twenty volunteers tackled the Burns Valley Overlook site, removing tires and trash from the mountain with contractors removing trash for proper disposal and recycling. The volunteers and contractors removed seven tons of trash, 1.7 short tons (1,500 kg) of scrap metal for recycling, and 402 tires, restoring the site so that the views can be enjoyed.

== Activities ==
The mountain supports wildlife populations of deer, bear, turkey, and grouse. Numerous hunting camps located along the Shermans Creek valley travel up the mountain every year to pursue game, most commonly deer and turkey.
