= Doylesburg, Pennsylvania =

Unincorporated community in Pennsylvania, US

- Unincorporated community
- Location within Pennsylvania
- Coordinates: 40°12′48″N 77°42′00″W
- Country: United States
- State: Pennsylvania
- County: Franklin
- Elevation: 1,040 ft (320 m)
- Time zone: UTC-5 (Eastern (EST))
  - Summer (DST): UTC-4 (EDT)
- ZIP code: 17219
- Area codes: 223 & 717
- GNIS feature ID: 1173439

Doylesburg is an unincorporated community in Franklin County, in the U.S. state of Pennsylvania.

== History ==
Doylesburg was platted in 1851 by Philip T. Doyle, and named for him. A post office was established at Doylesburg in 1854.
