= New Germantown, Pennsylvania =

Unincorporated community in Pennsylvania, US

Coordinates: 40.309°N 77.57°W

New Germantown
- Unincorporated community
- Interactive map of New Germantown
- Country: United States
- State: Pennsylvania
- County: Perry
- Township: Toboyne
- Elevation: 745 ft (227 m)
- Time zone: UTC-5 (EST)
  - Summer (DST): UTC-4 (Eastern Daylight Time)
- ZIP code: 17071
- Area code: 717

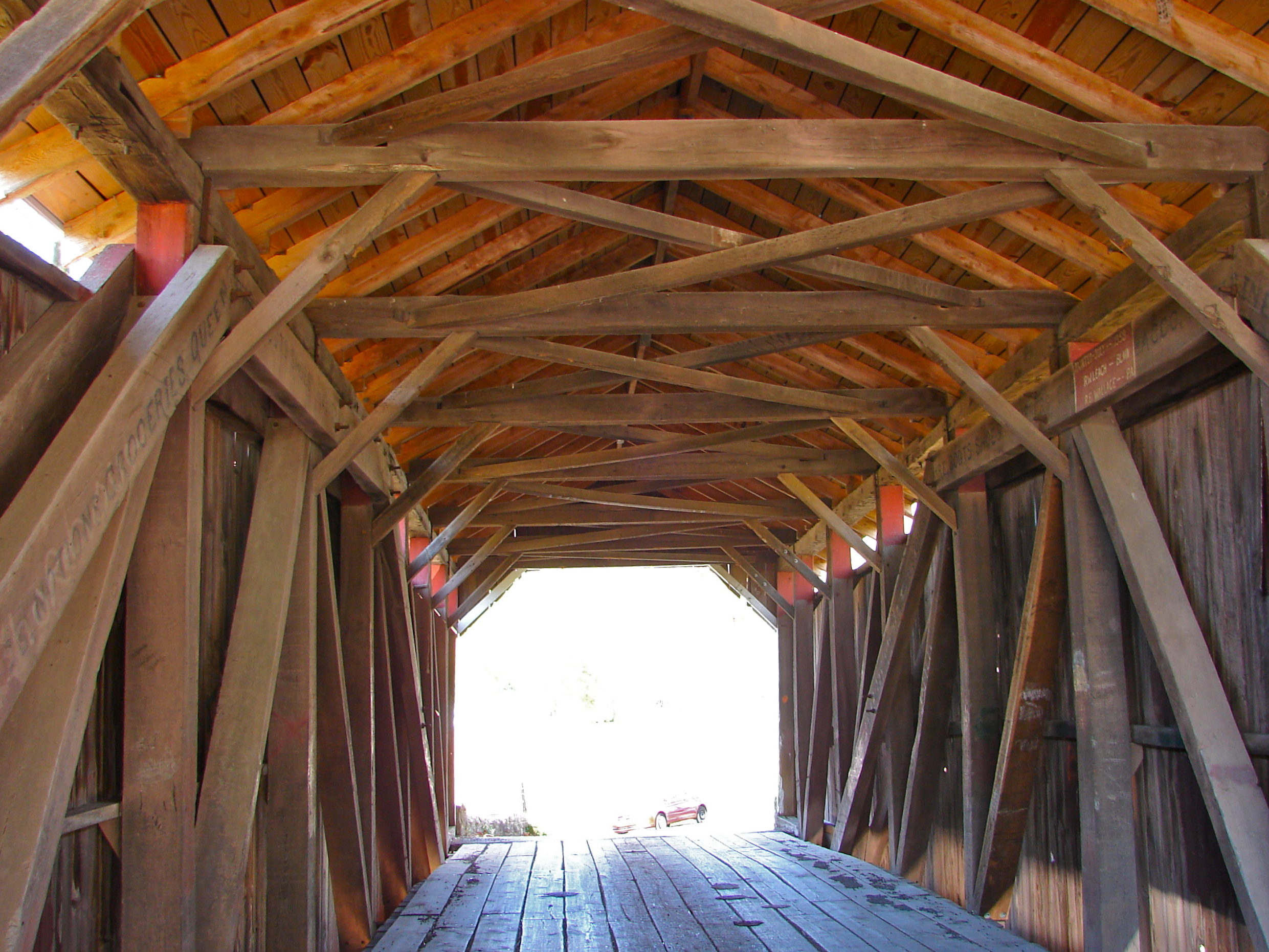
New Germantown covered bridge interior

New Germantown is an unincorporated community in Toboyne Township, Perry County, Pennsylvania, United States.

The center of New Germantown is at the intersection of Germantown Road and Big Spring Road. Its ZIP code is 17006.
