= Blain, Pennsylvania =

Borough in Pennsylvania, US

- Borough
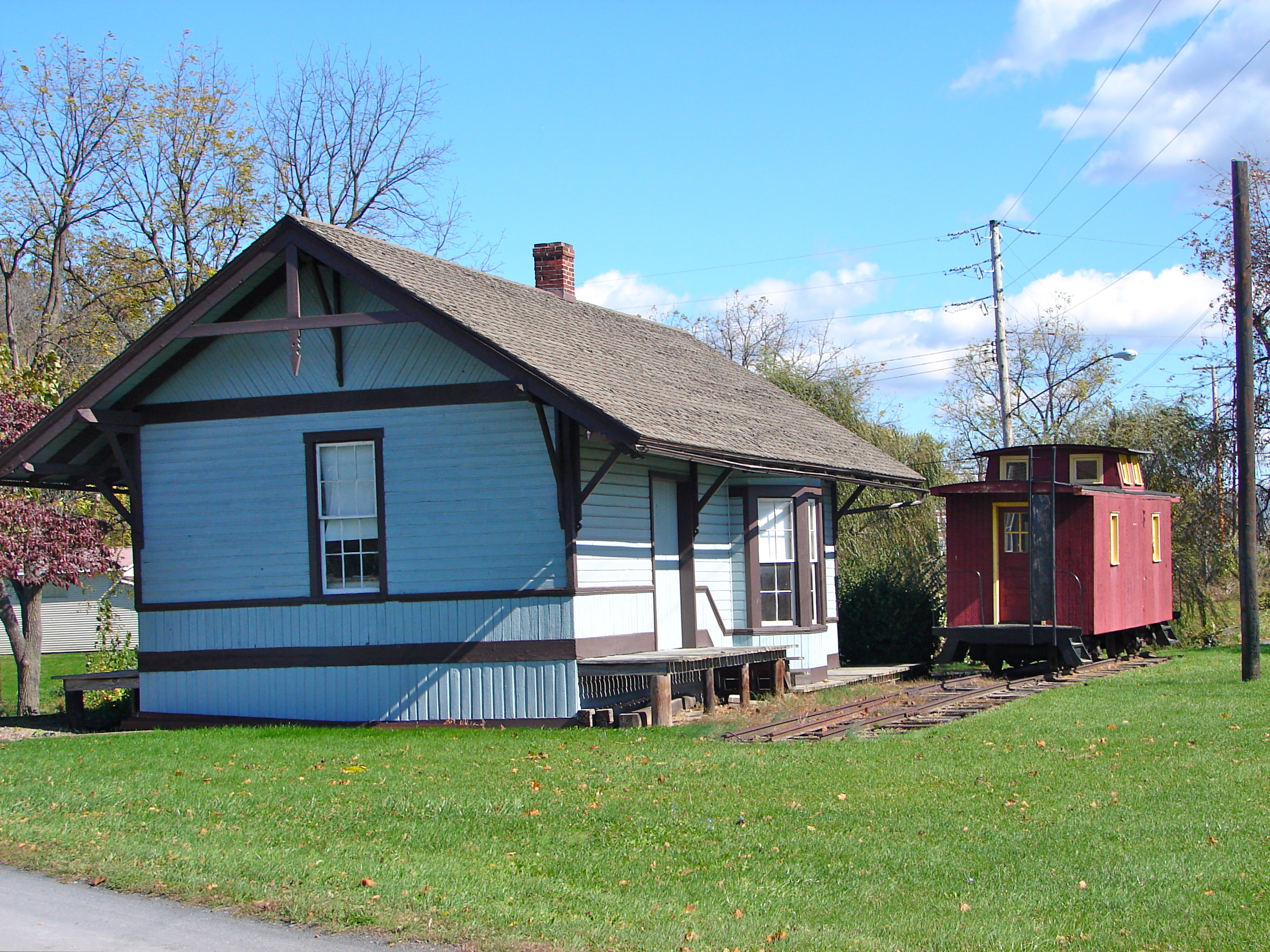
- Restored depot

- Location of Blain in Perry County, Pennsylvania.

- Location within Pennsylvania Location within the United States
- Coordinates: 40°20′14″N 77°30′38″W
- Country: United States
- State: Pennsylvania
- County: Perry
- Settled: 1846
- Incorporated: 1877

Area
  - Total: 0.32 sq mi (0.82 km^{2})
  - Land: 0.32 sq mi (0.82 km^{2})
  - Water: 0 sq mi (0.00 km^{2})
- Elevation (center of borough): 705 ft (215 m)
- Highest elevation (northern boundary): 730 ft (220 m)
- Lowest elevation (Sherman Creek): 675 ft (206 m)

Population (2020)
  - Total: 229
  - Density: 721.2/sq mi (278.47/km^{2})
- Time zone: UTC-5 (Eastern (EST))
  - Summer (DST): UTC-4 (EDT)
- Zip code: 17006
- Area codes: 717 and 223
- FIPS code: 42-06824

Blain is a borough in Perry County, Pennsylvania, United States. The population was 227 at the 2020 census. It is part of the Harrisburg metropolitan area. Blain is located in a valley region known as Sherman's Valley.

== History ==
Early settlement began around the mill built by James Blaine in 1778, from whom the borough took its name. The final "e" was dropped at some point, although there are records of county newspapers using the "Blaine" spelling until at least 1868. Early in the 1800s, Blaine's mill came into the possession of William Douglas, who had a post office established with the name "Douglas' Mills". A subsequent owner of the mill, Anthony Black, had the name of the post office changed to "Multicaulisville", after the mulberry tree (morus multicaulis), in which he had a financial interest during a speculative bubble in the tree. Lots were platted for sale in 1846 and the name of the post office was changed to "Blain".

At one time, Blain was noted for being the smallest borough in Pennsylvania to own its own water plant and electric street lighting system. Jacob Wentz was instrumental in the construction of the first water plant in about 1869 or 1870. The borough was incorporated by an order of the Perry county court on November 3, 1877.

== Geography ==
Blain is located at 40°20′14″N 77°30′38″W (40.337233, -77.510525).

According to the United States Census Bureau, the borough has a total area of 0.3 square miles (0.78 km^{2}), all land. Population is 286 (2000). Its highest point is Conococheague Mountain (1872 feet); the elevation is 750 feet on average.

== Demographics ==
Historical population
| Census | Pop. | Note | %± |
|---|---|---|---|
| 1880 | 270 | | — |
| 1890 | 249 | | −7.8% |
| 1900 | 326 | | 30.9% |
| 1910 | 326 | | 0.0% |
| 1920 | 310 | | −4.9% |
| 1930 | 291 | | −6.1% |
| 1940 | 280 | | −3.8% |
| 1950 | 315 | | 12.5% |
| 1960 | 336 | | 6.7% |
| 1970 | 287 | | −14.6% |
| 1980 | 274 | | −4.5% |
| 1990 | 266 | | −2.9% |
| 2000 | 252 | | −5.3% |
| 2010 | 263 | | 4.4% |
| 2020 | 229 | | −12.9% |
| 2021 (est.) | 226 | ▼ | −1.3% |

As of the census of 2000, there were 252 people, 96 households, and 67 families living in the borough. The population density was 714.1 inhabitants per square mile (275.7/km^{2}). There were 102 housing units at an average density of 289.1 per square mile (111.6/km^{2}). The racial makeup of the borough was 96.43% White and 3.57% African American.

There were 96 households, out of which 30.2% had children under the age of 18 living with them, 58.3% were married couples living together, 11.5% had a female householder with no husband present, and 29.2% were non-families. 22.9% of all households were made up of individuals, and 12.5% had someone living alone who was 65 years of age or older. The average household size was 2.63 and the average family size was 3.15.

In the borough the population was spread out, with 28.2% under the age of 18, 4.0% from 18 to 24, 29.0% from 25 to 44, 23.0% from 45 to 64, and 15.9% who were 65 years of age or older. The median age was 36 years. For every 100 females, there were 98.4 males. For every 100 females age 18 and over, there were 103.4 males.

The median income for a household in the borough was $32,500, and the median income for a family was $39,750. Males had a median income of $35,313 versus $21,875 for females. The per capita income for the borough was $16,223. About 11.6% of families and 12.6% of the population were below the poverty line, including 18.3% of those under the age of eighteen and 10.3% of those 65 or over.
