= Tuscarora State Forest =

State forest in Pennsylvania, United States

- Location within Pennsylvania
- Location: Pennsylvania, United States
- Coordinates: 40°20′14″N 77°30′38″W
- Area: 91,165 acres (368.93 km^{2})
- Governing body: Pennsylvania Department of Conservation and Natural Resources
- Website: Tuscarora State Forest

Tuscarora State Forest is a Pennsylvania state forest in Pennsylvania Bureau of Forestry District #3. The main office is located in Blain in Perry County, Pennsylvania in the United States.

Tuscarora State Forest contains 91,165 acres (36,893 ha) in several tracts and is located in Cumberland, Franklin, Huntingdon, Juniata, Mifflin, and Perry counties.

== History ==
Tuscarora State Forest was formed as a direct result of the depletion of the forests of Pennsylvania that took place during the mid-to-late 19th century. Conservationists like Dr. Joseph Rothrock became concerned that the forests would not regrow if they were not managed properly. Lumber and iron companies had harvested the old-growth forests for various reasons. They clear cut the forests and left behind nothing but dried tree tops and rotting stumps. The sparks of passing steam locomotives ignited wildfires that prevented the formation of second growth forests. The conservationists feared that the forest would never regrow if there was not a change in the philosophy of forest management. They called for the state to purchase land from the lumber and iron companies, and these companies were more than willing to sell their land since they had already depleted the natural resources of the forests. The changes began to take place in 1895 when Dr. Rothrock was appointed the first commissioner of the Pennsylvania Department of Forests and Waters, the forerunner of today's Pennsylvania Department of Conservation and Natural Resources. The Pennsylvania General Assembly passed a piece of legislation in 1897 that authorized the purchase of "unseated lands for forest reservations." This was the beginning of the State Forest system.

The forest is named for Tuscarora Mountain, which is within the state forest boundaries. The mountain was named for the Tuscarora, a tribe that joined the Iroquois Nation around 1714 following the Tuscarora War in North Carolina.

Tuscarora State Forest was originally part of the Rothrock Forest Reserve. It was merged with the Pennypacker and McClure reserves to form what is now Tuscarora State Forest. Much of the land was acquired from lumber and iron companies who had used the old-growth forest of hemlock, chestnut and oak to produce lumber and charcoal to fire the many iron furnaces that dotted the Pennsylvania landscape. Dr. Joseph Rothrock was an early pioneer in Pennsylvania forestry. In his position as commissioner of the Pennsylvania Department of Forests and Waters, he led the statewide effort to acquire lands that had been clear cut and left barren. Land was purchased from the lumber companies at minimal cost to the state, just a few dollars per acre.

The newly purchased land was largely barren. This was due to the widespread wildfires that swept over the hills and through the valleys when the sparks cast off by passing steam trains would ignite fires in the dried tree tops that were left behind by the lumbermen. The founding of the Civilian Conservation Corps by President Franklin D. Roosevelt during the Great Depression was vital in creating the thriving second growth forests that make up Tuscarora State Forest today. The young men of the CCC cleared the forests and streams of dried brush. They lived in one of six camps spread throughout Tuscarora State Forest. In addition to clearing brush they also built roads, bridges and trails in the forests and constructed many of the recreational facilities still in use today at several state parks in the Tuscarora State Forest area.

== Natural and wild areas ==
- Hemlocks Natural Area: 120 acres (49 ha) of old-growth Eastern Hemlock forest in a narrow ravine.
- Hoverter and Sholl Box Huckleberry Natural Area: 10 acres (4.0 ha); contains a Box Huckleberry over 1,300 years old.
- Frank E. Masland Jr. Natural Area: 1,270 acres (510 ha) of old secondary forest.
- James C. Nelson Wild Area: 5,345 acres (2,163 ha) of old secondary forest.

== Nearby state parks ==
Four Pennsylvania State Parks are contained within Tuscarora State Forest:

- Big Spring State Forest Picnic Area
- Colonel Denning State Park
- Fowlers Hollow State Park
- Little Buffalo State Park

== Neighboring state forest districts ==
- Bald Eagle State Forest (north)
- Weiser State Forest (east)
- Michaux State Forest (southeast)
- Buchanan State Forest (southwest)
- Rothrock State Forest (west)
